= 2026 Southeastern Conference softball season =

2026 SEC Softball Season
- League: NCAA Division I
- Sport: Softball
- Teams: 15

Regular Season

Tournament

Softball seasons
- ← 2025 2027 →

2026 Southeastern Conference softball standings
	Conf.				Overall
Team	W		L	PCT	W		L	PCT
No. 8 Oklahoma ‍†‍‍^{y}	20	–	4	.833	52	–	10	.839
No. 3 Alabama ‍‍‍^{y}	19	–	5	.792	56	–	9	.862
No. 9 Florida ‍‍‍^{y}	17	–	7	.708	52	–	12	.813
No. 1 Texas ‍‍‡‍^{y}	16	–	8	.667	53	–	12	.815
No. 4 Tennessee ‍‍‍^{y}	16	–	8	.667	49	–	12	.803
No. 20 Texas A&M ‍‍‍^{y}	16	–	8	.667	38	–	19	.667
No. 7 Arkansas ‍‍‍^{y}	15	–	9	.625	47	–	13	.783
No. 18 LSU ‍‍‍^{y}	13	–	11	.542	40	–	19	.678
No. 15 Georgia ‍‍‍^{y}	12	–	12	.500	41	–	20	.672
No. 10 Mississippi State ‍‍‍^{y}	9	–	15	.375	43	–	21	.672
Missouri ‍‍‍	9	–	15	.375	28	–	29	.491
South Carolina ‍‍‍^{y}	7	–	17	.292	32	–	28	.533
Ole Miss ‍‍‍^{y}	6	–	18	.250	36	–	26	.581
Auburn ‍‍‍	4	–	20	.167	27	–	28	.491
Kentucky ‍‍‍	1	–	23	.042	26	–	29	.473
† – Conference champion ‡ – Tournament champion y – Invited to the NCAA tournament As of June 4, 2026; Rankings from NFCA/USA Today

The 2026 SEC softball season began play Thursday, February 5, and conference play began on Friday, March 6. The 2026 SEC softball tournament takes place May 5–10 at John Cropp Stadium in Lexington, Kentucky. Vanderbilt University does not have a softball program.

== SEC preseason poll ==
The SEC preseason poll, voted by each team's head coach, has Texas finishing in first place. Each head coach votes on a scale of 14 points for first place descending to 1 point for last place, 14th. Each coach only votes for 14 teams, since they can not vote for their own team. Texas received 9 1st place votes, while Oklahoma had 6.

Preseason poll
Predicted finish	Team
1	Texas
2	Oklahoma
3	Tennessee
4	Florida
5	Arkansas
6	Texas A&M
7	LSU
8	Georgia
9	Alabama
10	South Carolina
11	Mississippi State
12	Auburn
13	Ole Miss
14	Missouri
15	Kentucky

== Record vs. conference opponents ==
. Blank are not scheduled. Blue are home games, otherwise away.

2026 SEC softball records Source: 2026 SEC softball game results, 2026 SEC softball schedule
Tm	W–L	ALA	ARK	AUB	FLA	UGA	KEN	LSU	MSU	MIZ	OKL	OMS	SCA	TEN	TEX	TAM	Tm	SR	SW
ALA	19–5		2–1	3–0	.	.	3–0	.	.	2–1	.	3–0	3–0	1–2	2–1	.	ALA	7–1	4–0
ARK	15–9	1–2		3–0	2–1	2–1	.	.	2–1	2–1	1–2	.	.	.	2–1	.	ARK	6–2	1–0
AUB	4–20	0–3	0–3		1–2	.	2–1	0–3	.	0–3	0–3	1–2	.	.	.	.	AUB	1–7	0–5
FLA	17–7	.	1–2	2–1		1–2	3–0	.	2–1	3–0	.	.	3–0	2–1	.	.	FLA	6–2	3–0
UGA	12–12	.	1–2	.	2–1		3–0	.	2–1	2–1	0–3	.	.	.	1–2	1–2	UGA	4–4	1–1
KEN	1–23	0–3	.	1–2	0–3	0–3		.	.	.	0–3	.	.	0–3	0–3	0–3	KEN	0–8	0–7
LSU	13–11	.	.	3–0	.	.	.		1–2	2–1	1–2	3–0	2–1	0–3	.	1–2	LSU	4–4	2–1
MSU	9–15	.	1–2	.	1–2	1–2	.	2–1		.	.	1–2	2–1	1–2	.	0–3	MSU	2–6	0–1
MIZ	9–15	1–2	1–2	3–0	0–3	1–2	.	1–2	.		.	.	1–2	1–2	.	.	MIZ	1–7	1–1
OKL	20–4	.	2–1	3–0	.	3–0	3–0	2–1	.	.		3–0	.	.	2–1	2–1	OKL	8–0	4–0
OMS	6–18	0–3	.	2–1	.	.	.	0–3	2–1	.	0–3		.	2–1	0–3	0–3	OMS	3–5	0–5
SCA	7–17	0–3	.	.	0–3	.	.	1–2	1–2	2–1	.	.		1–2	0–3	2–1	SCA	2–6	0–3
TEN	16–8	2–1	.	.	1–2	.	3–0	3–0	2–1	2–1	.	1–2	2–1		.	.	TEN	6–2	2–0
TEX	16–8	1–2	1–2	.	.	2–1	3–0	.	.	.	1–2	3–0	3–0	.		2–1	TEX	6–2	3–0
TAM	16–8	.	.	.	.	2–1	3–0	2–1	3–0	.	1–2	3–0	1–2	.	1–2		TAM	5–3	3–0
Tm	W–L	ALA	ARK	AUB	FLA	UGA	KEN	LSU	MSU	MIZ	OKL	OMS	SCA	TEN	TEX	TAM	Team	SR	SW

Updated for entire regular season.
Tie breakers: TEX>TEN>TAM, SCA common. MSU>MIZ, FLA common.

== National rankings ==
The SEC had 10 or 12 softball teams in the top 25 of all three final polls. From the previous poll, Texas rose 5 places in two polls. Tennessee rose 4 places in two polls. Mississippi State went up 10 or 12 places in all three. Oklahoma dropped 5, 6, or 8 in each poll. There were no other changes of 4 or more places, up or down, in any of these three polls. Rankings of opponent is at the time of the game in the NFCA/GOROUT poll. All games were in the 2026 NCAA Division I softball tournament.

- Texas went 2–1 in a three game series hosting 19th Arizona State, 2–1 versus 8th Tennessee, 1–0 versus 20th Mississippi State and 1st Nebraska, and 2–0 versus 4th Texas Tech in the championship series winning it. Texas also went 3–0 hosting not ranked.
- Tennessee 2–0 hosting 16th Georgia, 1–2 versus 6th Texas, 1–0 versus 4th Texas Tech. Tennessee also went 3–0 hosting not ranked.
- Mississippi State 1–0 at 12th Oregon, 2–1 at 2nd Oklahoma, 0–1 versus 4th Texas Tech, and 0–1 versus 6th Texas. Mississippi State also went 2–0 versus not ranked.

=== NFCA/GOROUT ===
The 14th poll was after the conference tournaments and before the NCAA tournament. The 15th poll, after the NCAA tournament, was the final poll.

Week	0	1	2	3	4	5	6	7	8	9	10	11	12	13	14	15	
TEX	1	2	3	3	3	3	2	1	1	4	5	7	7	10	6	1	TEX
ALA	15	10	8	5	4	4	4	6	4	3	3	3	4	4	3	3	ALA
TEN	4	3	1	1	1	1	1	4	7	9	7	8	8	5	8	4	TEN
ARK	9	9	7	7	7	8	10	10	9	8	8	9	10	9	10	7	ARK
OKL	3	4^{T}	5	6	6	6	6	5	3	2	1	1	1	1	2	8	OKL
FLA	6	4^{T}	4	4	5	5	5	3	5	6	4	5	6	7	9	9	FLA
MSU	22	19	14	12	12	12	11	12	13	13	14	17	18	19	20	10	MSU
UGA	20	20	16	15	15	15	15	15	15	16	15	15	17	17	16	15	UGA
LSU	16	12	19	17	17	20	22	20	22	21	22	20	20	18	18	18	LSU
TAM	11	8	11	13	14	16	16	16	16	14	12	11	14	15	17	20	TAM
SCAR	12	16	13	19	23	23	21	23	25	–	–	–	–	–	–	–	SCAR
OMS	14	21	25	–	–	–	–	–	–	–	–	–	–	–	–	–	OMS
AUB	–	–	–	–	–	–	–	–	–	–	–	–	–	–	–	–	AUB
KEN	–	–	–	–	–	–	–	–	–	–	–	–	–	–	–	–	KEN
MIZ	–	–	–	–	–	–	–	–	–	–	–	–	–	–	–	–	MIZ

=== D1Softball ===
The 13th poll will be after the end of the regular season, before the conference tournaments, then the 14th poll, after the NCAA tournament, will be the final poll.

Week	0	1	2	3	4	5	6	7	8	9	10	11	12	13	14	
TEX	1	2	2	2	2	2	2	1	1	4	4	5	5	6	1	TEX
ALA	14	10	9	8	5	5	4	6	4	3	2	2	4	3	3	ALA
TEN	4	3	1	1	1	1	1	4	8	9	8	9	7	7	4	TEN
ARK	8	9	7	7	6	6	9	9	6	6	6	6	8	5	7	ARK
MSU	23	17	14	14	13	12	11	14	14	15	14	18	16	18	8	MSU
OKL	3	4	4	5	4	4	5	5	3	2	1	1	1	1	9	OKL
FLA	5	5	5	4	9	9	7	3	7	7	7	7	9	9	10	FLA
UGA	17	19	11	11	15	14	14	12	12	13	12	12	13	12	11	UGA
LSU	12	12	20	19	19	20	23	22	22	20	18	17	20	17	16	LSU
TAM	11	13	13	17	18	18	15	15	15	14	13	11	15	16	18	TAM
SCA	13	20	19	22	23	24	25	–	–	–	–	–	23	25	–	SCA
MISS	24	–	–	–	–	–	–	–	–	–	–	–	–	–	–	MISS
AUB	–	–	–	–	–	–	–	–	–	–	–	–	–	–	–	AUB
KEN	–	–	–	–	–	–	–	–	–	–	–	–	–	–	–	KEN
MIZ	–	–	–	–	–	–	–	–	–	–	–	–	–	–	–	MIZ

=== ESPN/USA Softball Collegiate ===
The 14th poll will be after the conference tournaments and before the NCAA tournament. The 15th poll, after the NCAA tournament, will be the final poll.

Week	0	1	2	3	4	5	6	7	8	9	10	11	12	13	14	15	
TEX	1^{T}	2	3	3	3	3	2	1	1	4	5	4	5	6	3	1	TEX
ALA	16	13	9	7	6	6	6	7	5	3	2	2	3	3	2	3	ALA
TEN	4	3	1	1	1	1	1	4	8	10	9	9	9	7	8	4	TEN
ARK	8	11	8	8	9	9	9	9	6	6	6	6	7	5	5	7	ARK
MSU	24	21	18	19	17	14	12	14	16	15	14^{T}	19	16	19	20	8	MSU
OKL	3	4	4	5	4	4	4	3	3	2	1	1	1	1	4	9	OKL
FLA	6	5	5	6	8	8	8	5	7	7	7	8	8	9	10	10	FLA
UGA	15	17	12	11	12^{T}	13	13	11	11	14	13	11	14	13^{T}	11	11	UGA
LSU	13	10	17	17^{T}	16	17	19	20	20	18	17	15	19	18	18	15	LSU
TAM	11	8	13	15	15	16	15	15	15	13	11	10	12	13^{T}	16	16	TAM
OMS	22	–	–	–	–	–	–	–	–	–	–	–	–	–	–	25^{T}	OMS
SCA	14	20	22	22	24	24	24	24	–	24	25	24	21	23	–	25^{T}	SCA
AUB	–	–	–	–	–	–	–	–	–	–	–	–	–	–	–	–	AUB
KEN	–	–	–	–	–	–	–	–	–	–	–	–	–	–	–	–	KEN
MIZ	–	–	–	–	–	–	–	–	–	–	–	–	–	–	–	–	MIZ
