= 2026 Tennessee Lady Volunteers softball team =

American college softball season

2026 Tennessee Lady Volunteers softball

Knoxville Regional champion Knoxville Super Regional champion

Women's College World Series, 2–2
- Conference: Southeastern Conference
- Record: 49–12 (16–8 SEC)
- Head coach: Karen Weekly (24th season)
- Home stadium: Sherri Parker Lee Stadium

2026 Southeastern Conference softball standings
| | Conf. | | | | Overall |
| Team | W | | L | PCT | W | | L | PCT |
|---|---|---|---|---|---|---|---|---|
| No. 8 Oklahoma ‍†‍‍^{y} | 20 | – | 4 | .833 | 52 | – | 10 | .839 |
| No. 3 Alabama ‍‍‍^{y} | 19 | – | 5 | .792 | 56 | – | 9 | .862 |
| No. 9 Florida ‍‍‍^{y} | 17 | – | 7 | .708 | 52 | – | 12 | .813 |
| No. 1 Texas ‍‍‡‍^{y} | 16 | – | 8 | .667 | 53 | – | 12 | .815 |
| No. 4 Tennessee ‍‍‍^{y} | 16 | – | 8 | .667 | 49 | – | 12 | .803 |
| No. 20 Texas A&M ‍‍‍^{y} | 16 | – | 8 | .667 | 38 | – | 19 | .667 |
| No. 7 Arkansas ‍‍‍^{y} | 15 | – | 9 | .625 | 47 | – | 13 | .783 |
| No. 18 LSU ‍‍‍^{y} | 13 | – | 11 | .542 | 40 | – | 19 | .678 |
| No. 15 Georgia ‍‍‍^{y} | 12 | – | 12 | .500 | 41 | – | 20 | .672 |
| No. 10 Mississippi State ‍‍‍^{y} | 9 | – | 15 | .375 | 43 | – | 21 | .672 |
| Missouri ‍‍‍ | 9 | – | 15 | .375 | 28 | – | 29 | .491 |
| South Carolina ‍‍‍^{y} | 7 | – | 17 | .292 | 32 | – | 28 | .533 |
| Ole Miss ‍‍‍^{y} | 6 | – | 18 | .250 | 36 | – | 26 | .581 |
| Auburn ‍‍‍ | 4 | – | 20 | .167 | 27 | – | 28 | .491 |
| Kentucky ‍‍‍ | 1 | – | 23 | .042 | 26 | – | 29 | .473 |
† – Conference champion ‡ – Tournament champion y – Invited to the NCAA tournament As of June 4, 2026; Rankings from NFCA/USA Today

The 2026 Tennessee Lady Volunteers softball team was an American softball team that represented the University of Tennessee during the 2026 Southeastern Conference softball season and the 2026 NCAA Division I softball season. The team played their home games at Sherri Parker Lee Stadium in Knoxville, Tennessee, and was coached by Karen Weekly in her 24th season.

The Lady Vols finished with a record of 49–12, 16–8 in the SEC, and earned an invitation to the NCAA Division I tournament as the 7th overall seed. They swept the Knoxville Regional and Super Regional to advance to the Women's College World Series for the 10th time, where they were eliminated in the semifinals by eventual champion Texas.

== Personnel ==
=== Roster ===
2026 Tennessee Lady Volunteers roster
| Pitchers: 6 - Sage Mardjetko - Junior; 21 - Maddi Rutan - Junior; 23 - Karlyn Pickens - Senior; 33 - Erin Nuwer - Sophomore; 44 - Kailey Plumlee - Freshman; 80 - Peyton Hardenburger - Freshman; Catcherss: 22 - Elsa Morrison - Freshman; 50 - Jackie Kirkpatrick - Senior | Outfielders: 2 - Sophia Knight - Junior; 10 - Alannah Leach - Junior; 11 - Zoie Shuler - Sophomore; 15 - McCall Sims - Freshman; 20 - Saviya Morgan - Sophomore; 27 - Taelyn Holley - Freshman; 55 - Gabby Leach - Junior | Infielders: 5 - Meredith Barnhart - Freshman; 12 - Bella Faw - Junior; 13 - Emma Clarke - Sophomore; 16 - Camryn Sarvis - Senior; 25 - Ella Dodge - (redshirt) Sophomore; 42 - Amayah Doyle - Sophomore; 98 - Makenzie Butt - Sophomore |

=== Coaching staff ===
2026 Tennessee Lady Volunteers coaching staff
- Karen Weekly – Head coach - 24th season
- Megan Rhodes Smith – Assistant coach - 6th season
- Craig Snider – Assistant coach - 3rd season
- Stephanie Sanders – Assistant coach - 3rd season

== Schedule ==
Legend
| | Tennessee win |
| | Tennessee loss |
| * | Non-Conference game |

2026 Tennessee Lady Volunteers softball game log
Regular season

February
| Date | Opponent | Rank | Site/stadium | Score | Overall record | SEC record |
|---|---|---|---|---|---|---|
| Feb 5 | vs BYU* | No. 4 | Eddie C. Moore Complex • Clearwater, FL (NFCA Leadoff Classic) | W 10–0 ^{(10)} | 1–0 | |
| Feb 6 | vs No. 21 Liberty* | No. 4 | Eddie C. Moore Complex • Clearwater, FL (NFCA Leadoff Classic) | W 6–1 | 2–0 | |
| Feb 6 | vs Rutgers* | No. 4 | Eddie C. Moore Complex • Clearwater, FL (NFCA Leadoff Classic) | W 9–1 ^{(10)} | 3–0 | |
| Feb 7 | vs Boston College* | No. 4 | Eddie C. Moore Complex • Clearwater, FL (NFCA Leadoff Classic) | W 6–0 | 4–0 | |
| Feb 7 | vs No. 5 Oregon* | No. 4 | Eddie C. Moore Complex • Clearwater, FL (NFCA Leadoff Classic) | W 2–0 | 5–0 | |
| Feb 13 | vs No. 11 Nebraska* | No. 3 | Eddie C. Moore Complex • Clearwater, FL (Shriners Children's Clearwater Invitational) | W 4–1 | 6–0 | |
| Feb 13 | vs James Madison* | No. 3 | Eddie C. Moore Complex • Clearwater, FL (Shriners Children's Clearwater Invitational) | W 11–0 | 7–0 | |
| Feb 14 | vs Florida Atlantic* | No. 3 | Eddie C. Moore Complex • Clearwater, FL (Shriners Children's Clearwater Invitational) | W 8–0 ^{(6)} | 8–0 | |
| Feb 14 | vs No. 6 UCLA* | No. 3 | Eddie C. Moore Complex • Clearwater, FL (Shriners Children's Clearwater Invitational) | W 11–0 ^{(5)} | 9–0 | |
| Feb 15 | vs No. 7 Florida State* | No. 3 | Eddie C. Moore Complex • Clearwater, FL (Shriners Children's Clearwater Invitational) | W 9–1 | 10–0 | |
| Feb 20 | vs Missouri State* | No. 1 | Mary Bowers Field • Birmingham, AL (Green and Gold Classic) | W 5–0 | 11–0 | |
| Feb 20 | at UAB* | No. 1 | Mary Bowers Field • Birmingham, AL (Green and Gold Classic) | W 6–1 | 12–0 | |
| Feb 21 | vs Mercer* | No. 1 | Mary Bowers Field • Birmingham, AL (Green and Gold Classic) | W 17–0 ^{(5)} | 13–0 | |
| Feb 22 | vs Southern Illinois* | No. 1 | Mary Bowers Field • Birmingham, AL (Green and Gold Classic) | W 9–0 ^{(5)} | 14–0 | |
| Feb 27 | Appalachian State* | No. 1 | Sherri Parker Lee Stadium • Knoxville, TN | W 9–1 ^{(6)} | 15–0 | |
| Feb 27 | Penn State* | No. 1 | Sherri Parker Lee Stadium • Knoxville, TN | W 4–1 | 16–0 | |
| Feb 28 | Penn State* | No. 1 | Sherri Parker Lee Stadium • Knoxville, TN | W 3–1 | 17–0 | |
| Feb 28 | North Carolina Central* | No. 1 | Sherri Parker Lee Stadium • Knoxville, TN | W 8–0 ^{(5)} | 18–0 | |

March
| Date | Opponent | Rank | Site/stadium | Score | Overall record | SEC record |
|---|---|---|---|---|---|---|
| Mar 1 | Appalachian State* | No. 1 | Sherri Parker Lee Stadium • Knoxville, TN | W 6–2 | 19–0 | |
| Mar 3 | Belmont* | No. 1 | Sherri Parker Lee Stadium • Knoxville, TN | W 1–0 | 20–0 | |
| Mar 6 | No. 17 LSU | No. 1 | Sherri Parker Lee Stadium • Knoxville, TN | W 5–0 | 21–0 | 1–0 |
| Mar 7 | No. 17 LSU | No. 1 | Sherri Parker Lee Stadium • Knoxville, TN | W 11–6 | 22–0 | 2–0 |
| Mar 8 | No. 17 LSU | No. 1 | Sherri Parker Lee Stadium • Knoxville, TN | W 8–5 | 23–0 | 3–0 |
| Mar 10 | vs Austin Peay* | No. 1 | Ridley Complex • Columbia, TN (Mid-State Classic) | W 9–1 ^{(6)} | 24–0 | |
| Mar 11 | at Lipscomb* | No. 1 | Draper Diamond • Nashville, TN | W 12–0 ^{(5)} | 25–0 | |
| Mar 13 | at No. 12 Mississippi State | No. 1 | Nusz Park • Starkville, MS | W 3–1 ^{(9)} | 26–0 | 4–0 |
| Mar 14 | at No. 12 Mississippi State | No. 1 | Nusz Park • Starkville, MS | L 0–1 | 26–1 | 4–1 |
| Mar 15 | at No. 12 Mississippi State | No. 1 | Nusz Park • Starkville, MS | W 4–1 | 27–1 | 5–1 |
| Mar 20 | at No. 5 Florida | No. 1 | Katie Seashole Pressly Softball Stadium • Gainesville, FL | W 2–1 | 28–1 | 6–1 |
| Mar 21 | at No. 5 Florida | No. 1 | Katie Seashole Pressly Softball Stadium • Gainesville, FL | L 2–5 | 28–2 | 6–2 |
| Mar 22 | at No. 5 Florida | No. 1 | Katie Seashole Pressly Softball Stadium • Gainesville, FL | L 2–3 | 28–3 | 6–3 |
| Mar 24 | Tennessee Tech* | No. 4 | Sherri Parker Lee Stadium • Knoxville, TN | W 8–0 ^{(6)} | 29–3 | |
| Mar 27 | Ole Miss | No. 4 | Sherri Parker Lee Stadium • Knoxville, TN | L 1–2 | 29–4 | 7–3 |
| Mar 28 | Ole Miss | No. 4 | Sherri Parker Lee Stadium • Knoxville, TN | L 1–2 | 29–5 | 7–4 |
| Mar 29 | Ole Miss | No. 4 | Sherri Parker Lee Stadium • Knoxville, TN | W 4–3 | 30–5 | 8–4 |

April/May
| Date | Opponent | Rank | Site/stadium | Score | Overall record | SEC record |
|---|---|---|---|---|---|---|
| Apr 2 | No. 25 South Carolina | No. 7 | Sherri Parker Lee Stadium • Knoxville, TN | W 3–1 | 31–5 | 9–4 |
| Apr 3 | No. 25 South Carolina | No. 7 | Sherri Parker Lee Stadium • Knoxville, TN | L 1–5 | 31–6 | 9–5 |
| Apr 4 | No. 25 South Carolina | No. 7 | Sherri Parker Lee Stadium • Knoxville, TN | W 4–2 | 32–6 | 10–5 |
| Apr 7 | East Tennessee State* | No. 9 | Sherri Parker Lee Stadium • Knoxville, TN | W 12–0 | 33–6 | |
| Apr 8 | Kennesaw State* | No. 9 | Sherri Parker Lee Stadium • Knoxville, TN | W 13–5 | 34–6 | |
| Apr 11 | at Kentucky | No. 9 | John Cropp Stadium • Lexington, KY | W 5–0 | 35–6 | 11–5 |
| Apr 12 | at Kentucky | No. 9 | John Cropp Stadium • Lexington, KY | W 6–0 | 36–6 | 12–5 |
| Apr 13 | at Kentucky | No. 9 | John Cropp Stadium • Lexington, KY | W 10–3 | 37–6 | 13–5 |
| Apr 15 | at No. 17 Duke* | No. 7 | Duke Softball Stadium • Durham, NC | L 3–6 | 37–7 | |
| Apr 21 | Radford* | No. 8 | Sherri Parker Lee Stadium • Knoxville, TN | W 2–1 | 38–7 | |
| Apr 25 | No. 3 Alabama | No. 8 | Sherri Parker Lee Stadium • Knoxville, TN | L 0–12 ^{(5)} | 38–8 | 13–6 |
| Apr 26 | No. 3 Alabama | No. 8 | Sherri Parker Lee Stadium • Knoxville, TN | W 2–0 | 39–8 | 14–6 |
| Apr 27 | No. 3 Alabama | No. 8 | Sherri Parker Lee Stadium • Knoxville, TN | W 4–1 | 40–8 | 15–6 |
| Apr 30 | at Missouri | No. 8 | Mizzou Softball Stadium • Columbia, MO | W 3–1 | 41–8 | 16–6 |
| May 1 | at Missouri | No. 8 | Mizzou Softball Stadium • Columbia, MO | W 4–2 | 42–8 | 17–6 |
| May 2 | at Missouri | No. 8 | Mizzou Softball Stadium • Columbia, MO | L 3–4 | 42–9 | 17–7 |

Postseason

SEC Tournament
| Date | Opponent | Rank | Site/stadium | Score | Overall record | SECT record |
|---|---|---|---|---|---|---|
| May 6 | (13) Ole Miss | No. 5 (5) | John Cropp Stadium • Lexington, KY | L 1–4 | 42–10 | 0–1 |

NCAA Knoxville Regional
| Date | Opponent | Rank | Site/stadium | Score | Overall record | Reg. record |
|---|---|---|---|---|---|---|
| May 15 | Northern Kentucky | No. 8 (7) | Sherri Parker Lee Stadium • Knoxville, TN | W 3–1 | 43–10 | 1–0 |
| May 16 | No. 24 Virginia | No. 8 (7) | Sherri Parker Lee Stadium • Knoxville, TN | W 7–5 | 44–10 | 2–0 |
| May 17 | No. 24 Virginia | No. 8 (7) | Sherri Parker Lee Stadium • Knoxville, TN | W 5–1 | 45–10 | 3–0 |

NCAA Knoxville Super Regional
| Date | Opponent | Rank | Site/stadium | Score | Overall record | SR record |
|---|---|---|---|---|---|---|
| May 21 | No. 16 Georgia | No. 8 (7) | Sherri Parker Lee Stadium • Knoxville, TN | W 3–1 | 46–10 | 1–0 |
| May 22 | No. 16 Georgia | No. 8 (7) | Sherri Parker Lee Stadium • Knoxville, TN | W 2–1 | 47–10 | 2–0 |

NCAA Women's College World Series
| Date | Opponent | Rank | Site/stadium | Score | Overall record | SECT record |
|---|---|---|---|---|---|---|
| May 28 | No. 6 (2) Texas | No. 8 (7) | Devon Park • Oklahoma City, OK | W 6–3 | 48–10 | 1–0 |
| May 30 | No. 4 (11) Texas Tech | No. 8 (7) | Devon Park • Oklahoma City, OK | W 2–1 ^{(9)} | 49–10 | 2–0 |
| June 1 | No. 6 (2) Texas | No. 8 (7) | Devon Park • Oklahoma City, OK | L 2–5 | 49–11 | 2–1 |
| June 1 | No. 6 (2) Texas | No. 8 (7) | Devon Park • Oklahoma City, OK | L 0–4 | 49–12 | 2–2 |

Rankings from NFCA/USA Today prior to the game, tournament seeds in parentheses.

== Ranking movements ==
Ranking movements Legend: ██ Increase in ranking ██ Decrease in ranking
| | Week | | | | | | | | | | | | | | | |
| Poll | Pre | 1 | 2 | 3 | 4 | 5 | 6 | 7 | 8 | 9 | 10 | 11 | 12 | 13 | 14 | Final |
|---|---|---|---|---|---|---|---|---|---|---|---|---|---|---|---|---|
| NFCA/USA Today | 4 | 3 | 1 | 1 | 1 | 1 | 1 | 4 | 7 | 9 | 7 | 8 | 8 | 5 | 8 | 4 |
| ESPN.com/USA Softball Collegiate Top 25 | 4 | 3 | 1 | 1 | 1 | 1 | 1 | 4 | 8 | 10 | 9 | 9 | 9 | 7 | 8 | 4 |
| D1Softball | 4 | 3 | 1 | 1 | 1 | 1 | 1 | 4 | 8 | 9 | 8 | 9 | 7 | 7 | 7* | 4 |
| Softball America | 4 | 2 | 1 | 1 | 1 | 1 | 1 | 4 | 11 | 10 | 9 | 11 | 11 | 6 | 6* | 4 |
