= 2026 Arkansas Razorbacks softball team =

American college softball season

2026 Arkansas Razorbacks softball

NCAA Fayetteville Super Regional champions NCAA Fayetteville Regional champions

Women's College World Series, 0–2
- Conference: Southeastern Conference
- Record: 47–13 (15–9 SEC)
- Head coach: Courtney Deifel (11th season)
- Home stadium: Bogle Park

2026 Southeastern Conference softball standings
	Conf.				Overall
Team	W		L	PCT	W		L	PCT
No. 8 Oklahoma ‍†‍‍^{y}	20	–	4	.833	52	–	10	.839
No. 3 Alabama ‍‍‍^{y}	19	–	5	.792	56	–	9	.862
No. 9 Florida ‍‍‍^{y}	17	–	7	.708	52	–	12	.813
No. 1 Texas ‍‍‡‍^{y}	16	–	8	.667	53	–	12	.815
No. 4 Tennessee ‍‍‍^{y}	16	–	8	.667	49	–	12	.803
No. 20 Texas A&M ‍‍‍^{y}	16	–	8	.667	38	–	19	.667
No. 7 Arkansas ‍‍‍^{y}	15	–	9	.625	47	–	13	.783
No. 18 LSU ‍‍‍^{y}	13	–	11	.542	40	–	19	.678
No. 15 Georgia ‍‍‍^{y}	12	–	12	.500	41	–	20	.672
No. 10 Mississippi State ‍‍‍^{y}	9	–	15	.375	43	–	21	.672
Missouri ‍‍‍	9	–	15	.375	28	–	29	.491
South Carolina ‍‍‍^{y}	7	–	17	.292	32	–	28	.533
Ole Miss ‍‍‍^{y}	6	–	18	.250	36	–	26	.581
Auburn ‍‍‍	4	–	20	.167	27	–	28	.491
Kentucky ‍‍‍	1	–	23	.042	26	–	29	.473
† – Conference champion ‡ – Tournament champion y – Invited to the NCAA tournament As of June 4, 2026; Rankings from NFCA/USA Today

The 2026 Arkansas Razorbacks softball team represented the University of Arkansas in the 2026 NCAA Division I softball season. The Razorbacks were led by eleventh-year head coach Courtney Deifel and played their home games at Bogle Park in Fayetteville, Arkansas. Arkansas finished the season with a record of 47–13, finishing seventh in the Southeastern Conference with a record of 15–9.

The Razorbacks were invited to the 2026 NCAA Division I softball tournament. They swept the Fayetteville Regional and Super Regional to advance to the Women's College World Series, their first appearance in Oklahoma City. Arkansas was eliminated after losses to Nebraska and UCLA.

== Personnel ==
=== Roster ===
2026 Arkansas Razorbacks roster
Pitchers: 4 - Reis Beuerlein - Senior; 11 - Robyn Herron - Senior; 12 - Payton Burnham - Sophomore; 15 - Lillie-Faye McWhorter - Freshman; 25 - Cam Harrison - Sophomore; 32 - Saylor Timmerman - Freshman; 99 - Lexi King - Sophomore; Catcherss: 1 - Brinli Bain - Freshman; 17 - Kennedy Miller - Junior	Infielders: 6 - Ella McDowell - Sophomore; 14 - Karlie Davison - Senior; 20 - Tianna Bell - Senior; 26 - Atalyia Rijo - Senior; 34 - Jayden Ramos - Sophomore; Utility: 8 - Kyler Del Duca - Freshman; 13 - Kasey Wood - Junior; 45 - Jayden Wells - Junior; 46 - Kailey Wyckoff - Senior	Outfielders: 5 - Ashtyn Reichardt - (redshirt) Freshman; 16 - Ramsey Walker - Sophomore; 21 - Ava Carter - Sophomore; 22 - Dakota Kennedy - Senior; 23 - Reagan Johnson - Senior; 30 - Khamari Hall - Freshman

=== Coaching staff ===
2026 Arkansas Razorbacks coaching staff
- Courtney Deifel – Head coach - 11th season
- Matt Meuchel – Associate head coach - 10th season
- DJ Gasso – Assistant coach - 3rd season
- Parker Staggs – Assistant coach - 1st season

== Schedule ==
Legend
	Arkansas win
	Arkansas loss
*	Non-Conference game

2026 Arkansas Razorbacks softball game log
Regular season

February
Date	Opponent	Rank	Site/stadium	Score	Overall record	SEC record
Feb 6	vs Virginia*	No. 9	St. John Stadium – Charles Wade-John Lott Field • Conway, SC (Kickin' Chicken Classic)	W 17–1 ^{(5)}	1–0	
Feb 6	vs Akron*	No. 9	St. John Stadium – Charles Wade-John Lott Field • Conway, SC (Kickin' Chicken Classic)	W 9–1 ^{(6)}	2–0	
Feb 7	vs Virginia*	No. 9	St. John Stadium – Charles Wade-John Lott Field • Conway, SC (Kickin' Chicken Classic)	L 2–4	2–1	
Feb 7	at Coastal Carolina*	No. 9	St. John Stadium – Charles Wade-John Lott Field • Conway, SC (Kickin' Chicken Classic)	W 11–1 ^{(5)}	3–1	
Feb 8	vs Akron*	No. 9	St. John Stadium – Charles Wade-John Lott Field • Conway, SC (Kickin' Chicken Classic)	W 21–3 ^{(5)}	4–1	
Feb 13	vs Wichita State*	No. 9	Bobcat Softball Stadium • San Marcos, TX (States Up! Invitational)	W 10–2 ^{(5)}	5–1	
Feb 13	vs No. 18 Clemson*	No. 9	Bobcat Softball Stadium • San Marcos, TX (States Up! Invitational)	W 12–0 ^{(5)}	6–1	
Feb 14	vs BYU*	No. 9	Bobcat Softball Stadium • San Marcos, TX (States Up! Invitational)	W 11–1 ^{(5)}	7–1	
Feb 15	at Texas State*	No. 9	Bobcat Softball Stadium • San Marcos, TX (States Up! Invitational)	W 9–0 ^{(6)}	8–1	
Feb 20	Southeast Missouri State*	No. 7	Bogle Park • Fayetteville, AR (Razorback Invitational)	W 6–0	9–1	
Feb 20	Northwestern*	No. 7	Bogle Park • Fayetteville, AR (Razorback Invitational)	W 6–0	10–1	
Feb 21	Northwestern*	No. 7	Bogle Park • Fayetteville, AR (Razorback Invitational)	W 7–0	11–1	
Feb 21	Southeast Missouri State*	No. 7	Bogle Park • Fayetteville, AR (Razorback Invitational)	W 16–2 ^{(5)}	12–1	
Feb 22	Northwestern*	No. 7	Bogle Park • Fayetteville, AR (Razorback Invitational)	W 9–8	13–1	
Feb 26	Omaha*	No. 7	Bogle Park • Fayetteville, AR (Woo Pig Classic)	W 10–2 ^{(5)}	14–1	
Feb 27	Boise State*	No. 7	Bogle Park • Fayetteville, AR (Woo Pig Classic)	W 10–1 ^{(5)}	15–1	
Feb 27	Charlotte*	No. 7	Bogle Park • Fayetteville, AR (Woo Pig Classic)	W 14–3 ^{(5)}	16–1	
Feb 28	Omaha*	No. 7	Bogle Park • Fayetteville, AR (Woo Pig Classic)	W 4–2	17–1	
Feb 28	Charlotte*	No. 7	Bogle Park • Fayetteville, AR (Woo Pig Classic)	W 9–0 ^{(5)}	18–1	

March
Date	Opponent	Rank	Site/stadium	Score	Overall record	SEC record
Mar 1	Kansas*	No. 7	Bogle Park • Fayetteville, AR (Woo Pig Classic)	W 11–3 ^{(5)}	19–1	
Mar 6	No. 15 Georgia	No. 7	Bogle Park • Fayetteville, AR	L 2–7	19–2	0–1
Mar 7	No. 15 Georgia	No. 7	Bogle Park • Fayetteville, AR	W 7–6	20–2	1–1
Mar 8	No. 15 Georgia	No. 7	Bogle Park • Fayetteville, AR	W 6–0	21–2	2–1
Mar 9	at Missouri State*	No. 7	Killian Sports Complex • Springfield, MO	W 12–0 ^{(5)}	22–2	
Mar 13	at No. 4 Alabama	No. 8	Rhoads Stadium • Tuscaloosa, AL	L 1–4	22–3	2–2
Mar 14	at No. 4 Alabama	No. 8	Rhoads Stadium • Tuscaloosa, AL	W 14–9	23–3	3–2
Mar 15	at No. 4 Alabama	No. 8	Rhoads Stadium • Tuscaloosa, AL	L 1–4	23–4	3–3
Mar 17	Central Arkansas*	No. 10	Bogle Park • Fayetteville, AR	W 10–2 ^{(5)}	24–4	
Mar 20	UConn*	No. 10	Bogle Park • Fayetteville, AR	W 12–4 ^{(6)}	25–4	
Mar 21	UConn*	No. 10	Bogle Park • Fayetteville, AR	W 10–2 ^{(6)}	26–4	
Mar 22	UConn*	No. 10	Bogle Park • Fayetteville, AR	W 9–4	27–4	
Mar 24	at Central Arkansas*	No. 10	Farris Field • Conway, AR	W 11–2 ^{(6)}	28–4	
Mar 27	No. 3 Florida	No. 10	Bogle Park • Fayetteville, AR	W 6–2	29–4	4–3
Mar 28	No. 3 Florida	No. 10	Bogle Park • Fayetteville, AR	L 6–12	29–5	4–4
Mar 29	No. 3 Florida	No. 10	Bogle Park • Fayetteville, AR	W 6–4	30–5	5–4

April/May
Date	Opponent	Rank	Site/stadium	Score	Overall record	SEC record
Apr 4	Auburn	No. 9	Bogle Park • Fayetteville, AR	W 10–0 ^{(5)}	31–5	6–4
Apr 5	Auburn	No. 9	Bogle Park • Fayetteville, AR	W 4–0	32–5	7–4
Apr 6	Auburn	No. 9	Bogle Park • Fayetteville, AR	W 4–1	33–5	8–4
Apr 10	at No. 13 Mississippi State	No. 8	Nusz Park • Starkville, MS	L 0–1	33–6	8–5
Apr 11	at No. 13 Mississippi State	No. 8	Nusz Park • Starkville, MS	W 8–0 ^{(5)}	34–6	9–5
Apr 12	at No. 13 Mississippi State	No. 8	Nusz Park • Starkville, MS	W 10–3	35–6	10–5
Apr 17	at No. 1 Oklahoma	No. 8	Love's Field • Norman, OK	L 7–8	35–7	10–6
Apr 18	at No. 1 Oklahoma	No. 8	Love's Field • Norman, OK	W 3–2	36–7	11–6
Apr 19	at No. 1 Oklahoma	No. 8	Love's Field • Norman, OK	L 1–11 ^{(5)}	36–8	11–7
Apr 22	at Tulsa*	No. 9	Collins Family Softball Complex • Tulsa, OK	W 7–2	37–8	
Apr 24	Missouri	No. 9	Bogle Park • Fayetteville, AR	W 4–0	38–8	12–7
Apr 25	Missouri	No. 9	Bogle Park • Fayetteville, AR	W 9–2	39–8	13–7
Apr 26	Missouri	No. 9	Bogle Park • Fayetteville, AR	L 1–3	39–9	13–8
Apr 30	at No. 7 Texas	No. 10	Red and Charline McCombs Field • Austin, TX	W 2–0	40–9	14–8
May 1	at No. 7 Texas	No. 10	Red and Charline McCombs Field • Austin, TX	W 4–3	41–9	15–8
May 2	at No. 7 Texas	No. 10	Red and Charline McCombs Field • Austin, TX	L 1–4	41–10	15–9

Postseason

SEC Tournament
Date	Opponent	Rank	Site/stadium	Score	Overall record	SECT record
May 6	No. 19 (10) Mississippi State	No. 9 (7)	John Cropp Stadium • Lexington, KY	W 3–0	42–10	1–0
May 7	No. 4 (2) Alabama	No. 9 (7)	John Cropp Stadium • Lexington, KY	L 1–7	42–11	1–1

NCAA Fayetteville Regional
Date	Opponent	Rank	Site/stadium	Score	Overall record	Reg. record
May 15	Fordham	No. 10 (5)	Bogle Park • Fayetteville, AR	W 8–0 ^{(6)}	43–11	1–0
May 16	South Florida	No. 10 (5)	Bogle Park • Fayetteville, AR	W 9–1 ^{(6)}	44–11	2–0
May 17	South Florida	No. 10 (5)	Bogle Park • Fayetteville, AR	W 10–2 ^{(6)}	45–11	3–0

NCAA Fayetteville Super Regional
Date	Opponent	Rank	Site/stadium	Score	Overall record	SR record
May 22	No. 13 Duke	No. 10 (5)	Bogle Park • Fayetteville, AR	W 14–5 ^{(5)}	46–11	1–0
May 23	No. 13 Duke	No. 10 (5)	Bogle Park • Fayetteville, AR	W 10–2 ^{(5)}	47–11	2–0

NCAA Women's College World Series
Date	Opponent	Rank	Site/stadium	Score	Overall record	SECT record
May 28	No. 1 (4) Nebraska	No. 10 (5)	Devon Park • Oklahoma City, OK	L 3–5 ^{(10)}	47–12	0–1
May 29	No. 5 (8) UCLA	No. 10 (5)	Devon Park • Oklahoma City, OK	L 0–11 ^{(5)}	47–13	0–2

Rankings from NFCA/USA Today prior to the game, tournament seeds in parentheses.

== Ranking movements ==
Ranking movements Legend: ██ Increase in ranking ██ Decrease in ranking
	Week															
Poll	Pre	1	2	3	4	5	6	7	8	9	10	11	12	13	14	Final
NFCA/USA Today	9	9	7	7	7	8	10	10	9	8	8	9	10	9	10	7
ESPN.com/USA Softball Collegiate Top 25	8	11	8	8	9	9	9	9	6	6	6	6	7	5	5	7
D1Softball	8	9	7	7	6	6	9	9	6	6	6	6	8	5	5*	7
Softball America	7	9	7	5	5	5	9	9	6	7	5	6	7	5	5*	7
