= 2026 Mississippi State Bulldogs softball team =

American college softball season

2026 Mississippi State Bulldogs softball

NCAA Norman Super Regional champions NCAA Eugene Regional champions

Women's College World Series, 0–2
- Conference: Southeastern Conference
- Record: 43–21 (9–15 SEC)
- Head coach: Samantha Ricketts (7th season)
- Home stadium: Nusz Park

2026 Southeastern Conference softball standings
| | Conf. | | | | Overall |
| Team | W | | L | PCT | W | | L | PCT |
|---|---|---|---|---|---|---|---|---|
| No. 8 Oklahoma ‍†‍‍^{y} | 20 | – | 4 | .833 | 52 | – | 10 | .839 |
| No. 3 Alabama ‍‍‍^{y} | 19 | – | 5 | .792 | 56 | – | 9 | .862 |
| No. 9 Florida ‍‍‍^{y} | 17 | – | 7 | .708 | 52 | – | 12 | .813 |
| No. 1 Texas ‍‍‡‍^{y} | 16 | – | 8 | .667 | 53 | – | 12 | .815 |
| No. 4 Tennessee ‍‍‍^{y} | 16 | – | 8 | .667 | 49 | – | 12 | .803 |
| No. 20 Texas A&M ‍‍‍^{y} | 16 | – | 8 | .667 | 38 | – | 19 | .667 |
| No. 7 Arkansas ‍‍‍^{y} | 15 | – | 9 | .625 | 47 | – | 13 | .783 |
| No. 18 LSU ‍‍‍^{y} | 13 | – | 11 | .542 | 40 | – | 19 | .678 |
| No. 15 Georgia ‍‍‍^{y} | 12 | – | 12 | .500 | 41 | – | 20 | .672 |
| No. 10 Mississippi State ‍‍‍^{y} | 9 | – | 15 | .375 | 43 | – | 21 | .672 |
| Missouri ‍‍‍ | 9 | – | 15 | .375 | 28 | – | 29 | .491 |
| South Carolina ‍‍‍^{y} | 7 | – | 17 | .292 | 32 | – | 28 | .533 |
| Ole Miss ‍‍‍^{y} | 6 | – | 18 | .250 | 36 | – | 26 | .581 |
| Auburn ‍‍‍ | 4 | – | 20 | .167 | 27 | – | 28 | .491 |
| Kentucky ‍‍‍ | 1 | – | 23 | .042 | 26 | – | 29 | .473 |
† – Conference champion ‡ – Tournament champion y – Invited to the NCAA tournament As of June 4, 2026; Rankings from NFCA/USA Today

The 2026 Mississippi State Bulldogs softball team represented Mississippi State University in the 2026 NCAA Division I softball season. The Bulldogs were led by seventh-year head coach Samantha Ricketts and played their home games at Nusz Park in Starkville, Mississippi. Mississippi State finished the season with a record of 43–21, finishing tenth in the Southeastern Conference with a record of 9–15.

The Bulldogs were invited to the 2026 NCAA Division I softball tournament. They swept the Eugene Regional and upset third overall seed Oklahoma in the Norman Super Regional to advance to the Women's College World Series, their first appearance in Oklahoma City. They were eliminated after losses to eventual runner-up Texas Tech and champion Texas.

== Personnel ==
=== Roster ===
2026 Mississippi State Bulldogs roster
| Pitchers: 3 - Peja Goold - Senior; 4 - Alyssa Faircloth - Junior; 11 - Abigail Stevens - (redshirt) Freshman; 17 - Leila Ammon - Sophomore; 20 - Sara Phillips - Sophomore; 21 - Brinkley Moreton - Freshman; 48 - Delainey Everett - Junior; Catchers: 12 - Paige Ernstes - Sophomore; 19 - Anna Carder - Senior; 23 - Des Rivera - Senior | Infielders: 6 - Carson Smith - Freshman; 7 - Gabby Schaeffer - Freshman; 10 - Nadia Barbary - Senior; 24 - Morgan Stiles - Sophomore; 41 - Taylor Troutman - (redshirt) Freshman; 83 - Xiane Romero - Sophomore; Utility: 2 - Abby Grace Richardson - Senior; 5 - Ally Supan - Freshman; 31 - Sydney Carroll - Freshman | Outfielders: 1 - Gretta Grassel - Sophomore; 9 - Kiarra Sells - Senior; 13 - Morgan Bernardini - Senior; 22 - Tatum Silva - Junior; 33 - Kinley Keller - Freshman; 42 - Kalani Sells - Sophomore |

=== Coaching staff ===
2026 Mississippi State Bulldogs coaching staff
- Samantha Ricketts – Head coach - 7th season
- Tyler Bratton – Associate head coach - 13th season
- Taryne Mowatt-McKinney – Assistant coach - 3rd season
- Zac Shaw – Assistant coach - 4th season

== Schedule ==
Legend
| | Mississippi State win |
| | Mississippi State loss |
| * | Non-Conference game |

2026 Mississippi State Bulldogs softball game log
Regular season

February
| Date | Opponent | Rank | Site/stadium | Score | Overall record | SEC record |
|---|---|---|---|---|---|---|
| Feb 5 | at Baylor* | No. 22 | Getterman Stadium • Waco, TX (Getterman Classic) | W 10–0 ^{(5)} | 1–0 | |
| Feb 6 | vs Northwestern State* | No. 22 | Getterman Stadium • Waco, TX (Getterman Classic) | W 9–3 | 2–0 | |
| Feb 6 | vs Wichita State* | No. 22 | Getterman Stadium • Waco, TX (Getterman Classic) | W 5–2 ^{(8)} | 3–0 | |
| Feb 7 | vs New Mexico* | No. 22 | Getterman Stadium • Waco, TX (Getterman Classic) | W 8–1 | 4–0 | |
| Feb 10 | Southern Miss* | No. 19 | Nusz Park • Starkville, MS | W 5–0 | 5–0 | |
| Feb 13 | Murray State* | No. 19 | Nusz Park • Starkville, MS (The Snowman: Alex Wilcox Memorial presented by Newk's Eatery) | W 9–1 ^{(5)} | 6–0 | |
| Feb 13 | Rutgers* | No. 19 | Nusz Park • Starkville, MS (The Snowman: Alex Wilcox Memorial presented by Newk's Eatery) | W 8–0 ^{(6)} | 7–0 | |
| Feb 14 | Rutgers* | No. 19 | Nusz Park • Starkville, MS (The Snowman: Alex Wilcox Memorial presented by Newk's Eatery) | W 7–2 | 8–0 | |
| Feb 14 | North Texas* | No. 19 | Nusz Park • Starkville, MS (The Snowman: Alex Wilcox Memorial presented by Newk's Eatery) | W 3–1 | 9–0 | |
| Feb 15 | North Texas* | No. 19 | Nusz Park • Starkville, MS (The Snowman: Alex Wilcox Memorial presented by Newk's Eatery) | W 10–2 ^{(5)} | 10–0 | |
| Feb 18 | Memphis* | No. 14 | Nusz Park • Starkville, MS | W 8–4 | 11–0 | |
| Feb 20 | Belmont* | No. 14 | Nusz Park • Starkville, MS (Bulldog Invitational presented by Mizuno) | L 0–1 | 11–1 | |
| Feb 20 | Samford* | No. 14 | Nusz Park • Starkville, MS (Bulldog Invitational presented by Mizuno) | W 6–2 | 12–1 | |
| Feb 21 | Belmont* | No. 14 | Nusz Park • Starkville, MS (Bulldog Invitational presented by Mizuno) | W 4–1 | 13–1 | |
| Feb 22 | Delaware State* | No. 14 | Nusz Park • Starkville, MS (Bulldog Invitational presented by Mizuno) | W 19–1 ^{(5)} | 14–1 | |
| Feb 25 | at Georgia Tech* | No. 12 | Shirley Clements Mewborn Field • Atlanta, GA | W 8–3 | 15–1 | |
| Feb 27 | vs Wofford* | No. 12 | McWhorter Stadium • Clemson, SC (Tiger Invitational) | W 9–1 ^{(6)} | 16–1 | |
| Feb 28 | vs Georgia Southern* | No. 12 | McWhorter Stadium • Clemson, SC (Tiger Invitational) | W 8–0 ^{(5)} | 17–1 | |
| Feb 28 | at No. 25 Clemson* | No. 12 | McWhorter Stadium • Clemson, SC (Tiger Invitational) | L 0–3 | 17–2 | |

March
| Date | Opponent | Rank | Site/stadium | Score | Overall record | SEC record |
|---|---|---|---|---|---|---|
| Mar 1 | at No. 25 Clemson* | No. 12 | McWhorter Stadium • Clemson, SC (Tiger Invitational) | W 9–1 ^{(6)} | 18–2 | |
| Mar 4 | at UAB* | No. 12 | Mary Bowers Field • Birmingham, AL | W 6–1 | 19–2 | |
| Mar 6 | vs New Mexico* | No. 12 | Jaguar Field • Mobile, AL (Jaguar Classic) | W 1–0 | 20–2 | |
| Mar 6 | at South Alabama* | No. 12 | Jaguar Field • Mobile, AL (Jaguar Classic) | W 3–1 | 21–2 | |
| Mar 7 | vs New Mexico* | No. 12 | Jaguar Field • Mobile, AL (Jaguar Classic) | W 4–0 | 22–2 | |
| Mar 7 | vs Samford* | No. 12 | Jaguar Field • Mobile, AL (Jaguar Classic) | W 9–1 ^{(5)} | 23–2 | |
| Mar 8 | at South Alabama* | No. 12 | Jaguar Field • Mobile, AL (Jaguar Classic) | W 4–2 | 24–2 | |
| Mar 10 | Southeast Missouri State* | No. 12 | Nusz Park • Starkville, MS | W 9–0 ^{(5)} | 25–2 | |
| Mar 10 | Southeast Missouri State* | No. 12 | Nusz Park • Starkville, MS | W 4–0 | 26–2 | |
| Mar 13 | No. 1 Tennessee | No. 12 | Nusz Park • Starkville, MS | L 1–3 ^{(9)} | 26–3 | 0–1 |
| Mar 14 | No. 1 Tennessee | No. 12 | Nusz Park • Starkville, MS | W 1–0 | 27–3 | 1–1 |
| Mar 15 | No. 1 Tennessee | No. 12 | Nusz Park • Starkville, MS | L 1–4 | 27–4 | 1–2 |
| Mar 18 | UAB* | No. 11 | Nusz Park • Starkville, MS | W 4–0 | 28–4 | |
| Mar 20 | at No. 15 Georgia | No. 11 | Jack Turner Stadium • Athens, GA | L 3–6 | 28–5 | 1–3 |
| Mar 21 | at No. 15 Georgia | No. 11 | Jack Turner Stadium • Athens, GA | W 3–2 | 29–5 | 2–3 |
| Mar 22 | at No. 15 Georgia | No. 11 | Jack Turner Stadium • Athens, GA | L 4–7 | 29–6 | 2–4 |
| Mar 25 | UT Martin* | No. 12 | Nusz Park • Starkville, MS | W 7–0 | 30–6 | |
| Mar 28 | No. 23 South Carolina* | No. 12 | Nusz Park • Starkville, MS | L 0–2 | 30–7 | 2–5 |
| Mar 29 | No. 23 South Carolina* | No. 12 | Nusz Park • Starkville, MS | W 2–0 | 31–7 | 3–5 |
| Mar 30 | No. 23 South Carolina* | No. 12 | Nusz Park • Starkville, MS | W 4–3 | 32–7 | 4–5 |

April/May
| Date | Opponent | Rank | Site/stadium | Score | Overall record | SEC record |
|---|---|---|---|---|---|---|
| Apr 3 | at No. 5 Florida | No. 13 | Katie Seashole Pressly Softball Stadium • Gainesville, FL | L 0–2 | 32–8 | 4–6 |
| Apr 4 | at No. 5 Florida | No. 13 | Katie Seashole Pressly Softball Stadium • Gainesville, FL | W 9–5 | 33–8 | 5–6 |
| Apr 5 | at No. 5 Florida | No. 13 | Katie Seashole Pressly Softball Stadium • Gainesville, FL | L 4–5 | 33–9 | 5–7 |
| Apr 10 | No. 8 Arkansas | No. 13 | Nusz Park • Starkville, MS | W 1–0 | 34–9 | 6–7 |
| Apr 11 | No. 8 Arkansas | No. 13 | Nusz Park • Starkville, MS | L 0–8 ^{(5)} | 34–10 | 6–8 |
| Apr 12 | No. 8 Arkansas | No. 13 | Nusz Park • Starkville, MS | L 3–10 | 34–11 | 6–9 |
| Apr 17 | at No. 12 Texas A&M | No. 14 | Davis Diamond • College Station, TX | L 1–3 | 34–12 | 6–10 |
| Apr 18 | at No. 12 Texas A&M | No. 14 | Davis Diamond • College Station, TX | L 0–4 | 34–13 | 6–11 |
| Apr 19 | at No. 12 Texas A&M | No. 14 | Davis Diamond • College Station, TX | L 9–10 | 34–14 | 6–12 |
| Apr 24 | No. 20 LSU | No. 17 | Nusz Park • Starkville, MS | W 5–3 | 35–14 | 7–12 |
| Apr 25 | No. 20 LSU | No. 17 | Nusz Park • Starkville, MS | W 5–2 | 36–14 | 8–12 |
| Apr 26 | No. 20 LSU | No. 17 | Nusz Park • Starkville, MS | L 3–5 | 36–15 | 8–13 |
| Apr 30 | at Ole Miss | No. 18 | Alisa and Mark Bourne Stadium • Oxford, MS | W 1–0 | 37–15 | 9–13 |
| May 1 | at Ole Miss | No. 18 | Alisa and Mark Bourne Stadium • Oxford, MS | L 2–3 | 37–16 | 9–14 |
| May 2 | at Ole Miss | No. 18 | Alisa and Mark Bourne Stadium • Oxford, MS | L 0–3 | 37–17 | 9–15 |

Postseason

SEC Tournament
| Date | Opponent | Rank | Site/stadium | Score | Overall record | SECT record |
|---|---|---|---|---|---|---|
| May 5 | (15) Kentucky | No. 19 (10) | John Cropp Stadium • Lexington, KY | W 4–3 | 38–17 | 1–0 |
| May 6 | No. 9 (7) Arkansas | No. 19 (10) | John Cropp Stadium • Lexington, KY | L 0–3 | 38–18 | 1–1 |

NCAA Eugene Regional
| Date | Opponent | Rank | Site/stadium | Score | Overall record | Reg. record |
|---|---|---|---|---|---|---|
| May 15 | Saint Mary's | No. 20 | Jane Sanders Stadium • Eugene, OR | W 3–2 ^{(8)} | 39–18 | 1–0 |
| May 16 | No. 12 (14) Oregon | No. 20 | Jane Sanders Stadium • Eugene, OR | W 4–0 (Note: Alyssa Faircloth threw a no-hitter.) | 40–18 | 2–0 |
| May 17 | Saint Mary's | No. 20 | Jane Sanders Stadium • Eugene, OR | W 5–0 | 41–18 | 3–0 |

NCAA Norman Super Regional
| Date | Opponent | Rank | Site/stadium | Score | Overall record | SR record |
|---|---|---|---|---|---|---|
| May 22 | No. 2 (3) Oklahoma | No. 20 | Love's Field • Norman, OK | W 11–9 | 42–18 | 1–0 |
| May 23 | No. 2 (3) Oklahoma | No. 20 | Love's Field • Norman, OK | L 1–7 | 42–19 | 1–1 |
| May 24 | No. 2 (3) Oklahoma | No. 20 | Love's Field • Norman, OK | W 6–0 | 43–19 | 2–1 |

NCAA Women's College World Series
| Date | Opponent | Rank | Site/stadium | Score | Overall record | SECT record |
|---|---|---|---|---|---|---|
| May 28 | No. 4 (11) Texas Tech | No. 20 | Devon Park • Oklahoma City, OK | L 0–8 ^{(8)} | 43–20 | 0–1 |
| May 29 | No. 6 (2) Texas | No. 20 | Devon Park • Oklahoma City, OK | L 0–4 | 43–21 | 0–2 |

Rankings from NFCA/USA Today prior to the game, tournament seeds in parentheses.

== Ranking movements ==
Ranking movements Legend: ██ Increase in ranking ██ Decrease in ranking
| | Week | | | | | | | | | | | | | | | |
| Poll | Pre | 1 | 2 | 3 | 4 | 5 | 6 | 7 | 8 | 9 | 10 | 11 | 12 | 13 | 14 | Final |
|---|---|---|---|---|---|---|---|---|---|---|---|---|---|---|---|---|
| NFCA/USA Today | 22 | 19 | 14 | 12 | 12 | 12 | 11 | 12 | 13 | 13 | 14 | 17 | 18 | 19 | 20 | 10 |
| ESPN.com/USA Softball Collegiate Top 25 | 24 | 21 | 18 | 19 | 17 | 14 | 12 | 14 | 16 | 15 | 14 | 19 | 16 | 19 | 20 | 8 |
| D1Softball | 23 | 17 | 14 | 14 | 13 | 12 | 11 | 14 | 14 | 15 | 14 | 18 | 16 | 18 | 18* | 8 |
| Softball America | 21 | 18 | 13 | 16 | 17 | 13 | 13 | 14 | 15 | 16 | 18 | 21 | 18 | 19 | 19* | 8 |
