= 2026 UCLA Bruins softball team =

American college softball season

2026 UCLA Bruins softball

NCAA Los Angeles Super Regional champion NCAA Los Angeles Regional champion

Women's College World Series, 1–2
- Conference: Big Ten Conference
- Record: 53–10 (20–4 Big Ten)
- Head coach: Kelly Inouye-Perez (20th season)
- Home stadium: Easton Stadium

2026 Big Ten Conference softball standings
	Conf.				Overall
Team	W		L	PCT	W		L	PCT
No. 1 Nebraska ‍†‍‡‍^{y}	23	–	1	.958	52	–	8	.867
No. 12 Oregon ‍‍‍^{y}	20	–	4	.833	41	–	14	.745
No. 5 UCLA ‍‍‍^{y}	20	–	4	.833	53	–	10	.841
Indiana ‍‍‍^{y}	17	–	7	.708	43	–	16	.729
Northwestern ‍‍‍	16	–	8	.667	29	–	21	.580
Washington ‍‍‍^{y}	16	–	8	.667	37	–	20	.649
Wisconsin ‍‍‍^{y}	14	–	10	.583	33	–	21	.611
Ohio State ‍‍‍	13	–	11	.542	26	–	27	.491
Michigan ‍‍‍^{y}	11	–	13	.458	36	–	22	.621
Penn State ‍‍‍	11	–	13	.458	33	–	21	.611
Purdue ‍‍‍	11	–	13	.458	34	–	20	.630
Iowa ‍‍‍	7	–	17	.292	27	–	27	.500
Minnesota ‍‍‍	7	–	17	.292	16	–	36	.308
Rutgers ‍‍‍	6	–	18	.250	27	–	27	.500
Maryland ‍‍‍	5	–	19	.208	19	–	29	.396
Michigan State ‍‍‍	3	–	20	.130	17	–	34	.333
Illinois ‍‍‍	3	–	20	.130	15	–	39	.278
† – Conference champion ‡ – Tournament champion y – Invited to the NCAA Tournament; As of May 31, 2026; Rankings from NFCA/USA Today

The 2026 UCLA Bruins softball team represented the University of California, Los Angeles in the 2026 NCAA Division I softball season. The Bruins were coached by Kelly Inouye-Perez, in her twentieth season as head coach. The Bruins played their home games at Easton Stadium and finished with a record of 53–10. They competed in the Big Ten Conference, where they finished third with a 20–4 record.

The Bruins were invited to the 2026 NCAA Division I softball tournament, where they won the Los Angeles Regional and Super Regional to advance to the 2026 Women's College World Series. They finished tied for fifth place with a win against Arkansas and losses to eventual semifinalist Alabama and runner-up Texas Tech.

== Personnel ==
=== Roster ===
2026 UCLA Bruins roster
Pitchers: 3 - Natalie Cable - Freshman; 10 - Sydney Somerndike - (redshirt) Junior; 23 - Taylor Tinsley - Senior; 55 - Brynne Nally - Sophomore; 99 - Mattie Beliveau - Sophomore; Catchers: 00 - Sofia Mujica - Sophomore; 28 - Alexis Ramirez - (redshirt) Junior	Infielders: 15 - Jordan Woolery - Senior; 21 - Aleena Garcia - (redshirt) Freshman; 22 - Bri Alejandre - Freshman; 31 - Ramsey Suarez - (redshirt) Junior; 33 - Kaniya Bragg - Sophomore; Outfielders: 29 - Rylee Slimp - Sophomore; 38 - Jaella Ann Mercado - Freshman	Utility: 4 - Rylee Pinedo - (redshirt) Junior; 5 - Saydrie Meoño - Freshman; 7 - Jolyna Lamar - Freshman; 11 - Soo-Jin Berry - Junior; 26 - Jazmine Leyva - Freshman; 43 - Megan Grant - Senior; 56 - Mia Phillips - Sophomore

=== Coaches ===
2026 UCLA Bruins softball coaching staff
- Kelly Inouye-Perez - Head coach - 20th season
- Lisa Fernandez - Associate head Coach - 28th season
- Rob Schweyer - Assistant Coach - 3rd season
- Mysha Sataraka - Assistant Coach - 1st season

== Schedule ==
Legend
	UCLA win
	UCLA loss
*	Non-Conference game

2026 UCLA Bruins softball game log
Regular season

February
Date	Opponent	Rank	Site/stadium	Score	Overall record	B1G record
Feb 6	UC Santa Barbara*	No. 7	Easton Stadium • Los Angeles, CA (Stacy Winsberg Memorial Tournament)	W 18–1 ^{(5)}	1–0	
Feb 6	Northern Colorado*	No. 7	Easton Stadium • Los Angeles, CA (Stacy Winsberg Memorial Tournament)	W 10–1 ^{(5)}	2–0	
Feb 7	vs Oregon State*	No. 7	Bill Barber Park • Irvine, CA (Mark Campbell Invitational)	W 12–4 ^{(5)}	3–0	
Feb 7	vs Utah*	No. 7	Bill Barber Park • Irvine, CA (Mark Campbell Invitational)	W 11–0 ^{(5)}	4–0	
Feb 8	UC Riverside*	No. 7	Easton Stadium • Los Angeles, CA (Stacy Winsberg Memorial Tournament)	W 17–0 ^{(5)}	5–0	
Feb 13	vs Oklahoma State*	No. 6	Eddie C. Moore Complex • Clearwater, FL (Shriners Children's Clearwater Invitational)	L 3–4 ^{(8)}	5–1	
Feb 13	vs Missouri*	No. 6	Eddie C. Moore Complex • Clearwater, FL (Shriners Children's Clearwater Invitational)	W 6–5	6–1	
Feb 14	vs No. 3 Tennessee*	No. 6	Eddie C. Moore Complex • Clearwater, FL (Shriners Children's Clearwater Invitational)	L 0–11 ^{(5)}	6–2	
Feb 14	vs No. 7 Florida State*	No. 6	Eddie C. Moore Complex • Clearwater, FL (Shriners Children's Clearwater Invitational)	L 7–11	6–3	
Feb 15	vs No. 12 LSU*	No. 6	Eddie C. Moore Complex • Clearwater, FL (Shriners Children's Clearwater Invitational)	W 8–0 ^{(6)}	7–3	
Feb 19	vs Auburn*	No. 9	Big League Dreams Sports Park • Cathedral City, CA (Mary Nutter Collegiate Classic)	W 23–1 ^{(5)}	8–3	
Feb 20	vs Nevada*	No. 9	Big League Dreams Sports Park • Cathedral City, CA (Mary Nutter Collegiate Classic)	W 6–5	9–3	
Feb 20	vs No. 20 Duke*	No. 9	Big League Dreams Sports Park • Cathedral City, CA (Mary Nutter Collegiate Classic)	W 10–5	10–3	
Feb 21	vs Fresno State*	No. 9	Big League Dreams Sports Park • Cathedral City, CA (Mary Nutter Collegiate Classic)	W 11–0 ^{(5)}	11–3	
Feb 21	vs No. 13 South Carolina*	No. 9	Big League Dreams Sports Park • Cathedral City, CA (Mary Nutter Collegiate Classic)	W 5–4	12–3	
Feb 22	vs No. 11 Texas A&M*	No. 9	Big League Dreams Sports Park • Cathedral City, CA (Mary Nutter Collegiate Classic)	W 15–7 ^{(5)}	13–3	
Feb 27	vs East Texas A&M*	No. 8	Big League Dreams Sports Park • Cathedral City, CA (Mary Nutter Collegiate Classic)	W 14–0 ^{(5)}	14–3	
Feb 27	vs No. 4 Florida*	No. 8	Anderson Family Field • Fullerton, CA (Judi Garman Classic)	W 15–12	15–3	
Feb 28	vs BYU*	No. 8	Anderson Family Field • Fullerton, CA (Judi Garman Classic)	W 13–8	16–3	
Feb 28	vs Seattle*	No. 8	Anderson Family Field • Fullerton, CA (Judi Garman Classic)	W 16–10	17–3	

March
Date	Opponent	Rank	Site/stadium	Score	Overall record	B1G record
Mar 1	vs Oregon State*	No. 8	Anderson Family Field • Fullerton, CA (Judi Garman Classic)	W 13–3 ^{(5)}	18–3	
Mar 6	Wisconsin	No. 8	Easton Stadium • Los Angeles, CA	W 14–5 ^{(5)}	19–3	1–0
Mar 7	Wisconsin	No. 8	Easton Stadium • Los Angeles, CA	W 8–0 ^{(5)}	20–3	2–0
Mar 8	Wisconsin	No. 8	Easton Stadium • Los Angeles, CA	W 16–9	21–3	3–0
Mar 11	Loyola Marymount*	No. 7	Easton Stadium • Los Angeles, CA	W 9–1 ^{(5)}	22–3	
Mar 13	Michigan State	No. 7	Easton Stadium • Los Angeles, CA	W 10–0 ^{(5)}	23–3	4–0
Mar 14	Michigan State	No. 7	Easton Stadium • Los Angeles, CA	W 18–10 ^{(5)}	24–3	5–0
Mar 15	Michigan State	No. 7	Easton Stadium • Los Angeles, CA	W 10–2 ^{(6)}	25–3	6–0
Mar 21	at Rutgers	No. 7	Rutgers Softball Complex • Piscataway, NJ	W 16–5 ^{(5)}	26–3	7–0
Mar 22	at Rutgers	No. 7	Rutgers Softball Complex • Piscataway, NJ	W 13–3 ^{(6)}	27–3	8–0
Mar 23	at Rutgers	No. 7	Rutgers Softball Complex • Piscataway, NJ	W 17–6 ^{(6)}	28–3	9–0
Mar 27	at No. 9 Nebraska	No. 7	Bowlin Stadium • Lincoln, NE	L 1–4	28–4	9–1
Mar 28	at No. 9 Nebraska	No. 7	Bowlin Stadium • Lincoln, NE	W 6–5	29–4	10–1
Mar 29	at No. 9 Nebraska	No. 7	Bowlin Stadium • Lincoln, NE	L 4–8	29–5	10–2

April
Date	Opponent	Rank	Site/stadium	Score	Overall record	B1G record
Apr 2	Hawaii*	No. 10	Easton Stadium • Los Angeles, CA	W 9–5	30–5	
Apr 3	Indiana	No. 10	Easton Stadium • Los Angeles, CA	W 5–4	31–5	11–2
Apr 4	Indiana	No. 10	Easton Stadium • Los Angeles, CA	W 7–2	32–5	12–2
Apr 5	Indiana	No. 10	Easton Stadium • Los Angeles, CA	W 4–0	33–5	13–2
Apr 7	at Cal State Fullerton*	No. 10	Anderson Family Field • Fullerton, CA	W 13–11	34–5	
Apr 10	at Illinois	No. 10	Eichelberger Field • Urbana, IL	W 17–0	35–5	14–2
Apr 11	at Illinois	No. 10	Eichelberger Field • Urbana, IL	W 10–1 ^{(6)}	36–5	15–2
Apr 12	at Illinois	No. 10	Eichelberger Field • Urbana, IL	W 18–0 ^{(5)}	37–5	16–2
Apr 14	California Baptist*	No. 9	Easton Stadium • Los Angeles, CA	W 13–6	38–5	
Apr 15	at Long Beach State*	No. 9	LBSU Softball Complex • Long Beach, CA	W 27–9	39–5	
Apr 18	California*	No. 9	Easton Stadium • Los Angeles, CA	W 13–5 ^{(5)}	40–5	
Apr 18	California*	No. 9	Easton Stadium • Los Angeles, CA	W 9–1 ^{(5)}	41–5	
Apr 24	at No. 25 Washington	No. 6	Husky Softball Stadium • Seattle, WA	W 7–5	42–5	17–2
Apr 25	at No. 25 Washington	No. 6	Husky Softball Stadium • Seattle, WA	W 7–2	43–5	18–2
Apr 26	at No. 25 Washington	No. 6	Husky Softball Stadium • Seattle, WA	W 9–1 ^{(5)}	44–5	19–2

May
Date	Opponent	Rank	Site/stadium	Score	Overall record	B1G record
May 1	No. 11 Oregon	No. 5	Easton Stadium • Los Angeles, CA	L 2–8	44–6	19–3
May 2	No. 11 Oregon	No. 5	Easton Stadium • Los Angeles, CA	L 11–13	44–7	19–4
May 3	No. 11 Oregon	No. 5	Easton Stadium • Los Angeles, CA	W 11–3 ^{(5)}	45–7	20–4

Postseason

Big Ten Tournament
Date	Opponent	Rank (Seed)	Site/stadium	Score	Overall record	B1GT record
May 7	(11) Penn State	No. 6 (3)	Maryland Softball Stadium • College Park, MD	W 6–1	46–7	1–0
May 8	(7) Wisconsin	No. 6 (3)	Maryland Softball Stadium • College Park, MD	W 19–5 ^{(5)}	47–7	2–0
May 9	No. 2 (1) Nebraska	No. 6 (3)	Maryland Softball Stadium • College Park, MD	L 2–7	47–8	2–1

NCAA Los Angeles Regional
Date	Opponent	Rank (Seed)	Site/stadium	Score	Overall record	Reg record
May 15	California Baptist	No. 5 (8)	Easton Stadium • Los Angeles, CA	W 12–11	48–8	1–0
May 16	South Carolina	No. 5 (8)	Easton Stadium • Los Angeles, CA	W 7–2	49–8	2–0
May 17	South Carolina	No. 5 (8)	Easton Stadium • Los Angeles, CA	W 15–1 ^{(6)}	50–8	3–0

NCAA Los Angeles Super Regional
Date	Opponent	Rank (Seed)	Site/stadium	Score	Overall record	SR record
May 22	No. 23 UCF	No. 5 (8)	Easton Stadium • Los Angeles, CA	W 9–1 ^{(5)}	51–8	1–0
May 23	No. 23 UCF	No. 5 (8)	Easton Stadium • Los Angeles, CA	W 14–4	52–8	2–0

NCAA Women's College World Series
Date	Opponent	Rank (Seed)	Site/stadium	Score	Overall record	WCWS Record
May 28	No. 3 (1) Alabama	No. 5 (8)	ASA Hall of Fame Stadium • Oklahoma City, OK	L 3–6	52–9	0–1
May 29	No. 10 (5) Arkansas	No. 5 (8)	ASA Hall of Fame Stadium • Oklahoma City, OK	W 11–0 ^{(5)}	53–9	1–1
May 31	No. 4 (11) Texas Tech	No. 5 (8)	ASA Hall of Fame Stadium • Oklahoma City, OK	L 7–8 ^{(9)}	53–10	1–2

== Ranking movements ==
Ranking movements Legend: ██ Increase in ranking ██ Decrease in ranking
	Week															
Poll	Pre	1	2	3	4	5	6	7	8	9	10	11	12	13	14	Final
NFCA/USA Today	7	6	9	8	8	7	7	7	10	10	9	6	5	6	5	6
ESPN.com/USA Softball Collegiate Top 25	10	7	11	9	7	7	7	8	9	8	8	7	6	8	7	6
D1Softball	10	7	12	9	8	8	8	8	10	10	9	8	6	11	11*	6
Softball America	8	6	12	10	7	7	6	7	9	9	6	5	5	10	10*	6
