= 2026 Alabama Crimson Tide softball team =

American college softball season

2026 Alabama Crimson Tide softball

Tuscaloosa Regional champion Tuscaloosa Super Regional champion

Women’s College World Series, 2–2
- Conference: Southeastern Conference
- Record: 56-9 (19–5 SEC)
- Head coach: Patrick Murphy
- Home stadium: Rhoads Stadium

2026 Southeastern Conference softball standings
| | Conf. | | | | Overall |
| Team | W | | L | PCT | W | | L | PCT |
|---|---|---|---|---|---|---|---|---|
| No. 8 Oklahoma ‍†‍‍^{y} | 20 | – | 4 | .833 | 52 | – | 10 | .839 |
| No. 3 Alabama ‍‍‍^{y} | 19 | – | 5 | .792 | 56 | – | 9 | .862 |
| No. 9 Florida ‍‍‍^{y} | 17 | – | 7 | .708 | 52 | – | 12 | .813 |
| No. 1 Texas ‍‍‡‍^{y} | 16 | – | 8 | .667 | 53 | – | 12 | .815 |
| No. 4 Tennessee ‍‍‍^{y} | 16 | – | 8 | .667 | 49 | – | 12 | .803 |
| No. 20 Texas A&M ‍‍‍^{y} | 16 | – | 8 | .667 | 38 | – | 19 | .667 |
| No. 7 Arkansas ‍‍‍^{y} | 15 | – | 9 | .625 | 47 | – | 13 | .783 |
| No. 18 LSU ‍‍‍^{y} | 13 | – | 11 | .542 | 40 | – | 19 | .678 |
| No. 15 Georgia ‍‍‍^{y} | 12 | – | 12 | .500 | 41 | – | 20 | .672 |
| No. 10 Mississippi State ‍‍‍^{y} | 9 | – | 15 | .375 | 43 | – | 21 | .672 |
| Missouri ‍‍‍ | 9 | – | 15 | .375 | 28 | – | 29 | .491 |
| South Carolina ‍‍‍^{y} | 7 | – | 17 | .292 | 32 | – | 28 | .533 |
| Ole Miss ‍‍‍^{y} | 6 | – | 18 | .250 | 36 | – | 26 | .581 |
| Auburn ‍‍‍ | 4 | – | 20 | .167 | 27 | – | 28 | .491 |
| Kentucky ‍‍‍ | 1 | – | 23 | .042 | 26 | – | 29 | .473 |
† – Conference champion ‡ – Tournament champion y – Invited to the NCAA tournament As of June 4, 2026; Rankings from NFCA/USA Today

The 2026 Alabama Crimson Tide softball team was an American college softball team that represented the University of Alabama during the 2026 NCAA Division I softball season. The Crimson Tide were led by Patrick Murphy in his twenty-eighth season, and played their home games at Rhoads Stadium. They competed in the Southeastern Conference, where they finished the season with a 56–9 record and an 19-5 conference record.

The Crimson Tide were the runner-up 2026 SEC Tournament and qualified for the 2026 NCAA Division I softball tournament as the top overall seed. They swept the Tuscaloosa Regional and Super Regional to advance to their 16th Women's College World Series, where they were eventually defeated by Texas Tech in the semifinals.

== Personnel ==
=== Roster ===
2026 Alabama Crimson Tide roster
| Pitchers: 00 - Vic Moten - Freshman; 18 - Kaitlyn Pallozzi - Freshman; 23 - Jocelyn Briski - Junior; 24 - Braya Hodges - Sophomore; 55 - Alea Johnson - Senior; Catchers: 7 - Holly Beth Brooks - Freshman; 34 - Marlie Giles - Senior | Outfielders: 3 - Kristen White - Senior; 6 - Kinley Pate - Senior; 11 - Larissa Preuitt - Senior; 12 - Audrey Vandagriff - Sophomore; 21 - Ana Roman - Freshman; 88 - Lauren Johnson - Junior | Infielders: 2 - Gerritt Griggs - Freshman; 4 - Jena Young - Junior; 10 - Abby Duchscherer - Senior; 15 - Brooke Wells - Sophomore; 36 - Ambrey Taylor - Freshman; 47 - Salen Hawkins - Junior; 81 - Mari Hubbard - Sophomore; Utility: 31 - Alexis Pupillo - Senior |

=== Coaching staff ===
2026 Alabama Crimson Tide coaching staff
- Patrick Murphy - Head coach - 28th season
- Lance McMahon - Assistant coach - 4th season
- Kayla Braud - Assistant coach - 3rd season
- Adam Arbour - Assistant coach - 3rd season

== Schedule ==
Legend
| | Alabama win |
| | Alabama loss |
| * | Non-Conference game |

2026 Alabama Crimson Tide softball game log
Regular season

February
| Date | Opponent | Rank | Site/stadium | Score | Overall record | SEC record |
|---|---|---|---|---|---|---|
| Feb 5 | vs Villanova* | No. 15 | Shirley Clements Mewborn Field • Atlanta, GA (Buzz Classic) | W 17–0 ^{5} | 1–0 | |
| Feb 6 | vs East Carolina* | No. 15 | Shirley Clements Mewborn Field • Atlanta, GA (Buzz Classic) | W 9–1 ^{(5)} | 2–0 | |
| Feb 6 | at Georgia Tech* | No. 15 | Shirley Clements Mewborn Field • Atlanta, GA (Buzz Classic) | W 9–0 | 3–0 | |
| Feb 7 | vs Villanova* | No. 15 | Shirley Clements Mewborn Field • Atlanta, GA (Buzz Classic) | W 9–3 | 4–0 | |
| Feb 7 | at Georgia Tech* | No. 15 | Shirley Clements Mewborn Field • Atlanta, GA (Buzz Classic) | W 7–2 | 5–0 | |
| Feb 13 | Purdue* | No. 10 | Rhoads Stadium • Tuscaloosa, AL (2026 Easton Bama Bash) | W 10–0 ^{5} | 6–0 | |
| Feb 13 | Liberty* | No. 10 | Rhoads Stadium • Tuscaloosa, AL (2026 Easton Bama Bash) | W 6–3 | 7–0 | |
| Feb 14 | Liberty* | No. 10 | Rhoads Stadium • Tuscaloosa, AL (2026 Easton Bama Bash) | W 8–0 ^{(5)} | 8–0 | |
| Feb 14 | Purdue* | No. 10 | Rhoads Stadium • Tuscaloosa, AL (2026 Easton Bama Bash) | W 8–0 ^{(5)} | 9–0 | |
| Feb 20 | vs Elon* | No. 8 | JoAnne Graf Field • Tallahassee, FL; Dugout Club Classic) | W 7–0 | 10–0 | |
| Feb 20 | at No. 6 Florida State* | No. 8 | JoAnne Graf Field • Tallahassee, FL; Dugout Club Classic) | W 8–0 | 11–0 | |
| Feb 21 | at No. 6 Florida State* | No. 8 | JoAnne Graf Field • Tallahassee, FL; Dugout Club Classic) | W 5–1 | 12–0 | |
| Feb 22 | vs Dartmouth* | No. 8 | JoAnne Graf Field • Tallahassee, FL; Dugout Club Classic) | W 3–2 | 13–0 | |
| Feb 24 | UAB* | No. 5 | Rhoads Stadium • Tuscaloosa, AL | W 8–0 ^{(5)} | 14–0 | |
| Feb 27 | St. Thomas* | No. 5 | Rhoads Stadium • Tuscaloosa, AL (2026 T-Mobile Crimson Classic) | W 2–0 | 15–0 | |
| Feb 27 | South Florida* | No. 5 | Rhoads Stadium • Tuscaloosa, AL (2026 T-Mobile Crimson Classic) | W 8–0 ^{(5)} | 16–0 | |
| Feb 28 | Kent State* | No. 5 | Rhoads Stadium • Tuscaloosa, AL (2026 T-Mobile Crimson Classic) | W 8–1 | 17–0 | |
| Feb 28 | South Florida* | No. 5 | Rhoads Stadium • Tuscaloosa, AL (2026 T-Mobile Crimson Classic) | W 8–0 ^{(5)} | 18–0 | |

March
| Date | Opponent | Rank | Site/stadium | Score | Overall record | SEC record |
|---|---|---|---|---|---|---|
| Mar 1 | St. Thomas* | No. 5 | Rhoads Stadium • Tuscaloosa, AL (2026 T-Mobile Crimson Classic) | W 7–0 | 19–0 | |
| Mar 1 | Oakland* | No. 5 | Rhoads Stadium • Tuscaloosa, AL (2026 T-Mobile Crimson Classic) | W 8–1 | 20–0 | |
| Mar 6 | at Ole Miss | No. 4 | Alisa and Mark Bourne Stadium • Oxford, MS | W 5–3 | 21–0 | 1–0 |
| Mar 6 | at Ole Miss | No. 4 | Alisa and Mark Bourne Stadium • Oxford, MS | W 13–2 ^{(6)} | 22–0 | 2–0 |
| Mar 8 | at Ole Miss | No. 4 | Alisa and Mark Bourne Stadium • Oxford, MS | W 2–1 | 23–0 | 3–0 |
| Mar 10 | Samford* | No. 4 | Rhoads Stadium • Tuscaloosa, AL | W 8–1 | 24–0 | |
| Mar 13 | No. 8 Arkansas | No. 4 | Rhoads Stadium • Tuscaloosa, AL | W 4–1 | 25–0 | 4–0 |
| Mar 14 | No. 8 Arkansas | No. 4 | Rhoads Stadium • Tuscaloosa, AL | L 9–14 | 25–1 | 4–1 |
| Mar 15 | No. 8 Arkansas | No. 4 | Rhoads Stadium • Tuscaloosa, AL | W 4–1 | 26–1 | 5–1 |
| Mar 17 | Louisiana–Monroe* | No. 4 | Rhoads Stadium • Tuscaloosa, AL | W 4–1 | 27–1 | |
| Mar 20 | at Missouri | No. 4 | Mizzou Softball Stadium • Columbia, MO | W 2–1 | 28–1 | 6–1 |
| Mar 21 | at Missouri | No. 4 | Mizzou Softball Stadium • Columbia, MO | L 2–5 | 28–2 | 6–2 |
| Mar 22 | at Missouri | No. 4 | Mizzou Softball Stadium • Columbia, MO | W 4–3 | 29–2 | 7–2 |
| Mar 25 | Jacksonville State* | No. 6 | Rhoads Stadium • Tuscaloosa, AL | W 10–3 | 30–2 | |
| Mar 25 | North Alabama* | No. 6 | Rhoads Stadium • Tuscaloosa, AL | W 12–0 ^{(5)} | 31–2 | |
| Mar 27 | North Dakota State* | No. 6 | Rhoads Stadium • Tuscaloosa, AL | W 8–1 | 32–2 | |
| Mar 28 | North Dakota State* | No. 6 | Rhoads Stadium • Tuscaloosa, AL | W 13–0 ^{(5)} | 33–2 | |

April/May
| Date | Opponent | Rank | Site/stadium | Score | Overall record | SEC record |
|---|---|---|---|---|---|---|
| Apr 2 | No. 1 Texas | No. 4 | Rhoads Stadium • Tuscaloosa, AL | L 1–9 | 33–3 | 7–3 |
| Apr 3 | No. 1 Texas | No. 4 | Rhoads Stadium • Tuscaloosa, AL | W 11–4 | 34–3 | 8–3 |
| Apr 4 | No. 1 Texas | No. 4 | Rhoads Stadium • Tuscaloosa, AL | W 7–4 | 35–3 | 9–3 |
| Apr 7 | South Alabama* | No. 3 | Rhoads Stadium • Tuscaloosa, AL | W 8–0 ^{(5)} | 36–3 | |
| Apr 10 | at Auburn | No. 3 | Jane B. Moore Field • Auburn, AL | W 1–0 | 37–3 | 10–3 |
| Apr 11 | at Auburn | No. 3 | Jane B. Moore Field • Auburn, AL | W 4–0 | 38–3 | 11–3 |
| Apr 12 | at Auburn | No. 3 | Jane B. Moore Field • Auburn, AL | W 9–1 ^{(6)} | 39–3 | 12–3 |
| Apr 14 | at Samford* | No. 3 | Bulldog Softball Field • Homewood, AL | L 2–3 | 39–4 | |
| Apr 17 | Kentucky | No. 3 | Rhoads Stadium • Tuscaloosa, AL | W 9–0 ^{(6)} | 40–4 | 13–3 |
| Apr 18 | Kentucky | No. 3 | Rhoads Stadium • Tuscaloosa, AL | W 5–4 | 41–4 | 14–3 |
| Apr 19 | Kentucky | No. 3 | Rhoads Stadium • Tuscaloosa, AL | W 4–0 | 42–4 | 15–3 |
| Apr 21 | at UAB* | No. 3 | Mary Bowers Field • Birmingham, AL | W 6–0 | 43–4 | |
| Apr 25 | at No. 8 Tennessee | No. 3 | Sherri Parker Lee Stadium • Knoxville, TN | W 12–0 ^{(5)} | 44–4 | 16–3 |
| Apr 26 | at No. 8 Tennessee | No. 3 | Sherri Parker Lee Stadium • Knoxville, TN | L 0–2 | 44–5 | 16–4 |
| Apr 27 | at No. 8 Tennessee | No. 3 | Sherri Parker Lee Stadium • Knoxville, TN | L 1–4 | 44–6 | 16–5 |
| Apr 30 | South Carolina | No. 4 | Rhoads Stadium • Tuscaloosa, AL | W 3–2 | 45–6 | 17–5 |
| May 1 | South Carolina | No. 4 | Rhoads Stadium • Tuscaloosa, AL | W 1–0 | 46–6 | 18–5 |
| May 2 | South Carolina | No. 4 | Rhoads Stadium • Tuscaloosa, AL | W 4–3 | 47–6 | 19–5 |

Postseason

SEC Tournament
| Date | Opponent | Rank | Site/stadium | Score | Overall record | SECT record |
|---|---|---|---|---|---|---|
| May 7 | No. 9 (7) Arkansas | No. 4 (2) | John Cropp Stadium • Lexington, KY | W 7–1 | 48–6 | 1–0 |
| May 8 | No. 7 (3) Florida | No. 4 (2) | John Cropp Stadium • Lexington, KY | W 9–1 ^{(5)} | 49–6 | 2–0 |
| May 9 | No. 10 (4) Texas | No. 4 (2) | John Cropp Stadium • Lexington, KY | L 1–7 | 49–7 | 2–1 |

NCAA Tuscaloosa Regional
| Date | Opponent | Rank | Site/stadium | Score | Overall record | Reg. record |
|---|---|---|---|---|---|---|
| May 15 | USC Upstate | No. 3 (1) | Rhoads Stadium • Tuscaloosa, AL | W 8–0 ^{(5)} | 50–7 | 1–0 |
| May 16 | Belmont | No. 3 (1) | Rhoads Stadium • Tuscaloosa, AL | W 3–0 | 51–7 | 2–0 |
| May 17 | USC Upstate | No. 3 (1) | Rhoads Stadium • Tuscaloosa, AL | W 9–0 | 52–7 | 3–0 |

NCAA Tuscaloosa Super Regional
| Date | Opponent | Rank | Site/stadium | Score | Overall record | SR record |
|---|---|---|---|---|---|---|
| May 22 | No. 18 (16) LSU | No. 3 (1) | Rhoads Stadium • Tuscaloosa, AL | W 7–0 | 53–7 | 1–0 |
| May 23 | No. 18 (16) LSU | No. 3 (1) | Rhoads Stadium • Tuscaloosa, AL | W 4–1 | 54–7 | 2–0 |

NCAA Women's College World Series
| Date | Opponent | Rank | Site/stadium | Score | Overall record | WCWS record |
|---|---|---|---|---|---|---|
| May 28 | No. 5 (8) UCLA | No. 3 (1) | Devon Park • Oklahoma City, OK | W 6–3 | 55–7 | 1–0 |
| May 30 | No. 1 (4) Nebraska | No. 3 (1) | Devon Park • Oklahoma City, OK | W 5–1 | 56–7 | 2–0 |
| June 1 | No. 4 (11) Texas Tech | No. 3 (1) | Devon Park • Oklahoma City, OK | L 4–5 | 56–8 | 2–1 |
| June 1 | No. 4 (11) Texas Tech | No. 3 (1) | Devon Park • Oklahoma City, OK | L 0–2 | 56–9 | 2–2 |

Rankings from NFCA/USA Today prior to the game, tournament seeds in parentheses.

== Ranking movements ==
Ranking movements Legend: ██ Increase in ranking ██ Decrease in ranking
| | Week | | | | | | | | | | | | | | | |
| Poll | Pre | 1 | 2 | 3 | 4 | 5 | 6 | 7 | 8 | 9 | 10 | 11 | 12 | 13 | 14 | Final |
|---|---|---|---|---|---|---|---|---|---|---|---|---|---|---|---|---|
| NFCA/USA Today | 15 | 10 | 8 | 5 | 4 | 4 | 4 | 6 | 4 | 3 | 3 | 3 | 4 | 4 | 3 | 3 |
| ESPN.com/USA Softball Collegiate Top 25 | 16 | 13 | 9 | 7 | 6 | 6 | 6 | 7 | 5 | 3 | 2 | 2 | 3 | 3 | 2 | 3 |
| D1Softball | 14 | 10 | 9 | 8 | 5 | 5 | 4 | 6 | 4 | 3 | 2 | 2 | 4 | 3 | 3* | 3 |
| Softball America | 13 | 8 | 6 | 4 | 4 | 4 | 4 | 6 | 4 | 1 | 2 | 3 | 3 | 4 | 4* | 3 |
