= 2026 SEC softball tournament =

American college softball postseason tournament

2026 Southeastern Conference softball tournament
- Teams: 15
- Format: Single-elimination tournament
- Finals site: John Cropp Stadium; Lexington, Kentucky
- Champions: Texas (1st title)
- Runner-up: Alabama (9th title game)
- Winning coach: Mike White (1st title)
- MVP: Teagan Kavan (Texas)
- Television: SEC Network, ESPN

2026 Southeastern Conference softball standings
	Conf.				Overall
Team	W		L	PCT	W		L	PCT
No. 8 Oklahoma ‍†‍‍^{y}	20	–	4	.833	52	–	10	.839
No. 3 Alabama ‍‍‍^{y}	19	–	5	.792	56	–	9	.862
No. 9 Florida ‍‍‍^{y}	17	–	7	.708	52	–	12	.813
No. 1 Texas ‍‍‡‍^{y}	16	–	8	.667	53	–	12	.815
No. 4 Tennessee ‍‍‍^{y}	16	–	8	.667	49	–	12	.803
No. 20 Texas A&M ‍‍‍^{y}	16	–	8	.667	38	–	19	.667
No. 7 Arkansas ‍‍‍^{y}	15	–	9	.625	47	–	13	.783
No. 18 LSU ‍‍‍^{y}	13	–	11	.542	40	–	19	.678
No. 15 Georgia ‍‍‍^{y}	12	–	12	.500	41	–	20	.672
No. 10 Mississippi State ‍‍‍^{y}	9	–	15	.375	43	–	21	.672
Missouri ‍‍‍	9	–	15	.375	28	–	29	.491
South Carolina ‍‍‍^{y}	7	–	17	.292	32	–	28	.533
Ole Miss ‍‍‍^{y}	6	–	18	.250	36	–	26	.581
Auburn ‍‍‍	4	–	20	.167	27	–	28	.491
Kentucky ‍‍‍	1	–	23	.042	26	–	29	.473
† – Conference champion ‡ – Tournament champion y – Invited to the NCAA tournament As of June 4, 2026; Rankings from NFCA/USA Today

The 2026 SEC softball tournament was the postseason softball tournament for the 2026 season for the Southeastern Conference (SEC). The tournament was held May 5–9, 2026, at John Cropp Stadium on the campus of the University of Kentucky in Lexington, Kentucky. The tournament champion, Texas, earned the conference's automatic bid to the 2026 NCAA Division I softball tournament.

== Format ==
All 15 softball-sponsoring members of the SEC participated in the event. Teams were seeded based on conference record. The top 4 seeds earned a double-bye to the quarterfinals, and seeds 5–9 earned a bye to the second round. The tournament was conducted in a single-elimination format. This was the second year of this format.

== Record vs. conference opponents ==
. Blank are not scheduled. Blue are home games, otherwise away.

2026 SEC softball records Source: 2026 SEC softball game results, 2026 SEC softball schedule
Tm	W–L	ALA	ARK	AUB	FLA	UGA	KEN	LSU	MSU	MIZ	OKL	OMS	SCA	TEN	TEX	TAM	Tm	SR	SW
ALA	19–5		2–1	3–0	.	.	3–0	.	.	2–1	.	3–0	3–0	1–2	2–1	.	ALA	7–1	4–0
ARK	15–9	1–2		3–0	2–1	2–1	.	.	2–1	2–1	1–2	.	.	.	2–1	.	ARK	6–2	1–0
AUB	4–20	0–3	0–3		1–2	.	2–1	0–3	.	0–3	0–3	1–2	.	.	.	.	AUB	1–7	0–5
FLA	17–7	.	1–2	2–1		1–2	3–0	.	2–1	3–0	.	.	3–0	2–1	.	.	FLA	6–2	3–0
UGA	12–12	.	1–2	.	2–1		3–0	.	2–1	2–1	0–3	.	.	.	1–2	1–2	UGA	4–4	1–1
KEN	1–23	0–3	.	1–2	0–3	0–3		.	.	.	0–3	.	.	0–3	0–3	0–3	KEN	0–8	0–7
LSU	13–11	.	.	3–0	.	.	.		1–2	2–1	1–2	3–0	2–1	0–3	.	1–2	LSU	4–4	2–1
MSU	9–15	.	1–2	.	1–2	1–2	.	2–1		.	.	1–2	2–1	1–2	.	0–3	MSU	2–6	0–1
MIZ	9–15	1–2	1–2	3–0	0–3	1–2	.	1–2	.		.	.	1–2	1–2	.	.	MIZ	1–7	1–1
OKL	20–4	.	2–1	3–0	.	3–0	3–0	2–1	.	.		3–0	.	.	2–1	2–1	OKL	8–0	4–0
OMS	6–18	0–3	.	2–1	.	.	.	0–3	2–1	.	0–3		.	2–1	0–3	0–3	OMS	3–5	0–5
SCA	7–17	0–3	.	.	0–3	.	.	1–2	1–2	2–1	.	.		1–2	0–3	2–1	SCA	2–6	0–3
TEN	16–8	2–1	.	.	1–2	.	3–0	3–0	2–1	2–1	.	1–2	2–1		.	.	TEN	6–2	2–0
TEX	16–8	1–2	1–2	.	.	2–1	3–0	.	.	.	1–2	3–0	3–0	.		2–1	TEX	6–2	3–0
TAM	16–8	.	.	.	.	2–1	3–0	2–1	3–0	.	1–2	3–0	1–2	.	1–2		TAM	5–3	3–0
Tm	W–L	ALA	ARK	AUB	FLA	UGA	KEN	LSU	MSU	MIZ	OKL	OMS	SCA	TEN	TEX	TAM	Team	SR	SW

Updated for entire regular season.
Tie breakers: TEX>TEN>TAM, SCA common. MSU>MIZ, FLA common.

== Tournament ==
=== Bracket ===
First round – May 5
14	Auburn	6
11	Missouri	2
15	Kentucky	3
10	Mississippi State	4
13	Ole Miss	2
12	South Carolina	0

Second round – May 6
14	Auburn	11
6	Texas A&M	8
10	Mississippi State	0
7	Arkansas	3
13	Ole Miss	4
5	Tennessee	1
8	LSU	3
9	Georgia	7

Quarter-finals – May 7
14	Auburn	9
3	Florida	10
7	Arkansas	1
2	Alabama	7
13	Ole Miss	0
4	Texas	6
9	Georgia	10
1	Oklahoma	5

Semi-finals – May 8
3	Florida	1
2	Alabama	9^{(5)}
4	Texas	5
9	Georgia	4

Final – May 9
2	Alabama	1
4	Texas	7

== Schedule ==
Game	Time*	Matchup^{#}	Score	Television	Attendance
First Round – Tuesday, May 5
1	11:00 a.m.	No. 11 Missouri vs. No. 14 Auburn	2–6	SEC Network	1,999
2	2:00 p.m.	No. 10 Mississippi State vs. No. 15 Kentucky	4–3	SEC Network	1,999
3	5:25 p.m.	No. 12 South Carolina vs. No. 13 Ole MIss	0–2	SEC Network	1,999
Second Round – Wednesday, May 6
4	11:00 a.m.	No. 6 Texas A&M vs. No. 14 Auburn	8–11	SEC Network	1,854
5	2:25 p.m.	No. 7 Arkansas vs. No. 10 Mississippi State	3–0	SEC Network	1,854
6	5:00 p.m.	No. 5 Tennessee vs. No. 13 Ole Miss	1–4	SEC Network	1,999
7	7:52 p.m.	No. 8 LSU vs. No. 9 Georgia	3–7	SEC Network	1,942
Quarterfinals – Thursday, May 7
8	11:00 a.m.	No. 3 Florida vs. No. 14 Auburn	10–9	SEC Network	1,978
9	2:25 p.m.	No. 2 Alabama vs. No. 7 Arkansas	7–1	SEC Network	1,978
10	5:00 p.m.	No. 4 Texas vs. No. 13 Ole Miss	6–0	SEC Network	2,069
11	8:00 p.m.	No. 1 Oklahoma vs. No. 9 Georgia	5–10	SEC Network	2,069
Semifinals – Friday, May 8
12	5:00 p.m.	No. 3 Florida vs. No. 2 Alabama	1–9	ESPN	2,328
13	7:30 p.m.	No. 4 Texas vs. No. 9 Georgia	5–4	ESPN	2,328
Championship – Saturday, May 9
14	5:00 p.m.	No. 2 Alabama vs. No. 4 Texas	1–7	ESPN	2,353
*Game times in EDT. # – Rankings denote tournament seed.

== All-Tournament Team ==
Player	Team
Leighann Goode	Texas
**Teagan Kavan**	Texas
Viviana Martinez	Texas
Jaycie Nichols	Texas
Jocelyn Briski	Alabama
Alexis Pupillo	Alabama
Ambrey Taylor	Alabama
Kendall Grover	Florida
Townsen Thomas	Florida
Emily Digby	Georgia
Jaydyn Goodwin	Georgia

MVP in bold
