= Rachel Lawson =

American college softball coach

Current position
- Title: Head coach
- Team: Kentucky
- Conference: Southeastern Conference
- Record: 650–415–1 (.610)

Biographical details
- Born: June 11, 1972 (age 54); Orlando, Florida, U.S.

Playing career
- 1992–1995: UMass
- Position: First base

Coaching career (HC unless noted)
- 1996–2002: Maryland (Asst.)
- 2003–2004: Philadelphia Force (Asst.)
- 2005–2007: Western Kentucky
- 2008–present: Kentucky

Head coaching record
- Overall: 742–499–1 (.598)

Accomplishments and honors

Awards
- SEC Coach of the Year (2016)

Rachel Lawson (born June 11, 1972) is an American former collegiate softball first baseman and current head coach at the University of Kentucky. Lawson played college softball for the UMass Minutewomen in the Atlantic 10 Conference from 1991 to 1994, helping them to the 1992 Women's College World Series.

== Coaching career ==
In July 2007, Lawson was named the head coach at Kentucky. Lawson led Kentucky to their first ever Women's College World Series appearance in 2014. She is the winningest coach in program history.

== Statistics ==
=== UMass Minutewomen ===
YEAR	G	AB	R	H	BA	RBI	HR	3B	2B	TB	SLG	BB	SO	SB	SBA
1991	38	67	7	20	.298	7	0	0	2	22	.328%	3	5	1	1
1992	55	163	33	56	.343	23	0	0	7	63	.386%	10	15	2	4
1993	49	156	18	44	.282	21	0	0	9	53	.339%	4	5	0	0
1994	49	165	14	50	.303	25	0	1	5	57	.345%	3	4	0	0
TOTALS	191	551	72	170	.308	76	0	0	23	193	.350%	20	29	3	5

== Head coaching record ==
Record table
Season	Team	Overall	Conference	Standing	Postseason
Western Kentucky Lady Toppers (Sun Belt Conference) (2005–2007)
2005	Western Kentucky	33–24	15–13	T-2nd	
2006	Western Kentucky	29–28	14–9	3rd	
2007	Western Kentucky	30–32	13–15	6th	
Western Kentucky:		92–84 (.523)	42–37 (.532)		
Kentucky Wildcats (Southeastern Conference) (2008–Present)
2008	Kentucky	17–37	3–25	5th (East)	
2009	Kentucky	34–23	13–14	4th (East)	NCAA Regional
2010	Kentucky	32–27	11–13	4th (East)	NCAA Regional
2011	Kentucky	40–16	14–9	4th (East)	NCAA Super Regional
2012	Kentucky	30–30	15–13	4th (East)	NCAA Regional
2013	Kentucky	41–21	13–11	4th (East)	NCAA Super Regional
2014	Kentucky	50–19	13–11	7th	Women's College World Series
2015	Kentucky	32–26	5–19	12th	NCAA Super Regional
2016	Kentucky	46–14	17–7	2nd	NCAA Regional
2017	Kentucky	39–19	12–12	7th	NCAA Super Regional
2018	Kentucky	35–21	8–15	10th	NCAA Super Regional
2019	Kentucky	36–24	14–10	T–2nd	NCAA Super Regional
2020	Kentucky	20–4	2–1		Season canceled due to COVID-19
2021	Kentucky	43–16	13–11	T–5th	NCAA Super Regional
2022	Kentucky	37–19	13–11	T–4th	NCAA Regional
2023	Kentucky	31–22–1	10–14	9th	NCAA Regional
2024	Kentucky	31–24	8–16	T–11th	NCAA Regional
2025	Kentucky	31-28	7-17	13th	NCAA Regional
2026	Kentucky	26-28	1-23	15th	
Kentucky:		651–418–1 (.609)	192–252 (.432)		
Total:		743–502–1 (.597)			
National champion Postseason invitational champion Conference regular season champion Conference regular season and conference tournament champion Division regular season champion Division regular season and conference tournament champion Conference tournament champion
