= 2026 Florida Gators softball team =

American college softball season

2026 Florida Gators softball

NCAA Gainesville Regional champion
- Conference: Southeastern Conference
- Record: 52–12 (17–7 SEC)
- Head coach: Tim Walton (21st season)
- Assistant coaches: Aric Thomas (9th season); Francesca Enea (3rd season); Stephanie VanBrakle Prothro (2nd season)
- Home stadium: Katie Seashole Pressly Softball Stadium

2026 Southeastern Conference softball standings
	Conf.				Overall
Team	W		L	PCT	W		L	PCT
No. 8 Oklahoma ‍†‍‍^{y}	20	–	4	.833	52	–	10	.839
No. 3 Alabama ‍‍‍^{y}	19	–	5	.792	56	–	9	.862
No. 9 Florida ‍‍‍^{y}	17	–	7	.708	52	–	12	.813
No. 1 Texas ‍‍‡‍^{y}	16	–	8	.667	53	–	12	.815
No. 4 Tennessee ‍‍‍^{y}	16	–	8	.667	49	–	12	.803
No. 20 Texas A&M ‍‍‍^{y}	16	–	8	.667	38	–	19	.667
No. 7 Arkansas ‍‍‍^{y}	15	–	9	.625	47	–	13	.783
No. 18 LSU ‍‍‍^{y}	13	–	11	.542	40	–	19	.678
No. 15 Georgia ‍‍‍^{y}	12	–	12	.500	41	–	20	.672
No. 10 Mississippi State ‍‍‍^{y}	9	–	15	.375	43	–	21	.672
Missouri ‍‍‍	9	–	15	.375	28	–	29	.491
South Carolina ‍‍‍^{y}	7	–	17	.292	32	–	28	.533
Ole Miss ‍‍‍^{y}	6	–	18	.250	36	–	26	.581
Auburn ‍‍‍	4	–	20	.167	27	–	28	.491
Kentucky ‍‍‍	1	–	23	.042	26	–	29	.473
† – Conference champion ‡ – Tournament champion y – Invited to the NCAA tournament As of June 4, 2026; Rankings from NFCA/USA Today

The 2026 Florida Gators softball team are an American college softball team that represents the University of Florida during the 2026 NCAA Division I softball season. The Gators are led by head coach Tim Walton in his 21st season. They play their home games at Katie Seashole Pressly Softball Stadium in Gainesville, Florida.

== Previous season ==
The Gators finished the 2025 season 48–17 overall, and 14–10 in the SEC, finishing in sixth place during the regular season. They fell in the first game of the 2025 SEC tournament to Ole Miss. They would host the Gainesville Regional and Super Regional, eliminating Mercer, Florida Atlantic, Georgia Tech, and arch-rivals Georgia. They were eliminated from the postseason after losing their first two games in the Women's College World Series.

== Roster and personnel ==
2026 Florida Gators roster
Pitchers: 00 – Ava Brown – Junior; 1 – Caroline Stanton – Freshman; 7 – Keagan Rothrock – Junior; 13 – Olivia Miller – Junior; 16 – Allison Sparkman – Junior; 32 – Leah Stevens – Freshman; 39 – Katelynn Oxley – Sophomore; Catchers: 8 – Jocelyn Erickson – Senior; 74 – Ella Wesolowski – Junior; Outfielders: 21 – Taylor Shumaker – Sophomore; 22 – Cassidy McLellan – Junior; 44 – Townsen Thomas – (redshirt) Freshman	Infielders: 4 – Kalie Matsuno – Freshman; 10 – Gabi Comia – Sophomore; 12 – Kendall Grover – Senior; 31 – Kenleigh Cahalan – Junior; Utility: 2 – Giulia Desiderio – Graduate student; 24 – Madison Walker – Junior

2026 Florida Gators coaching staff
- Tim Walton – Head coach
- Aric Thomas – Assistant coach
- Francesca Enea – Assistant coach
- Stephanie VanBrakle Prothro – Assistant coach

== Schedule and results ==
2026 Florida Gators Softball Game Log
Regular season (47–9)

February (23–1)
Date	Opponent	Rank	Stadium Site	Score	Win	Loss	Save	Attendance	Overall Record	SEC Record
February 6	Illinois State; USF-Rawlings Invitational	No. 5	USF Softball Stadium; Tampa, FL	7–0	**Rothrock** (1–0)	McLeod (0–1)	—	1,634	1–0	—
February 7	vs. RV Michigan; USF-Rawlings Invitational	No. 5	USF Softball Stadium; Tampa, FL	5–1	**Rothrock** (2–0)	Hoehn (0–1)	—	1,679	2–0	—
February 7	vs. Bethune-Cookman; USF-Rawlings Invitational	No. 5	USF Softball Stadium; Tampa, FL	8–0 ^{(6)}	**Brown** (1–0)	Tohara-Yshiki (0–1)	—	—	3–0	—
February 8	vs. Kansas; USF-Rawlings Invitational	No. 5	USF Softball Stadium; Tampa, FL	11–2	**Rothrock** (3–0)	Washington (0–1)	—	2,053	4–0	—
February 8	at USF; USF-Rawlings Invitational	No. 5	USF Softball Stadium; Tampa, FL	6–1	**Oxley** (1–0)	Ernst (0–1)	**Brown** (1)	2,192	5–0	—
February 10	at Jacksonville	No. 5	Pruitt Softball Complex; Jacksonville, FL	20–0 ^{(5)}	**Brown** (2–0)	White (0–1)	—	201	6–0	—
February 11	Jacksonville	No. 5	Katie Seashole Pressly Stadium; Gainesville, FL	11–1 ^{(5)}	**Rothrock** (4–0)	Harrelson (0–1)	—	1,189	7–0	—
February 13	Marshall; Florida Classic	No. 5	Katie Seashole Pressly Stadium; Gainesville, FL	6–3	**Brown** (3–0)	King (0–1)	**Rothrock** (1)	2,008	8–0	—
February 13	Georgia Tech; Florida Classic	No. 5	Katie Seashole Pressly Stadium; Gainesville, FL	8–5	**Miller** (1–0)	Johnson (0–1)	**Brown** (2)	2,008	9–0	—
February 14	FIU; Florida Classic	No. 5	Katie Seashole Pressly Stadium; Gainesville, FL	14–6 ^{(6)}	**Miller** (2–0)	Girigorie (0–1)	—	1,860	10–0	—
February 14	Marshall; Florida Classic	No. 5	Katie Seashole Pressly Stadium; Gainesville, FL	14–4 ^{(6)}	**Rothrock** (5–0)	King (0–2)	—	1,861	11–0	—
February 15	Georgia Tech; Florida Classic	No. 5	Katie Seashole Pressly Stadium; Gainesville, FL	5–1	**Stevens** (1–0)	Watts (0–1)	**Brown** (3)	1,638	12–0	—
February 17	UNF	No. 5	Katie Seashole Pressly Stadium; Gainesville, FL	7–3	**Rothrock** (6–0)	Cook (0–1)	—	1,103	13–0	—
February 18	at UNF	No. 5	UNF Softball Complex; Jacksonville, FL	10–0 ^{(5)}	**Brown** (4–0)	Ponich (0–1)	—	523	14–0	—
February 20	Longwood; Florida Tournament	No. 5	Katie Seashole Pressly Stadium; Gainesville, FL	10–0 ^{(5)}	**Rothrock** (7–0)	Gawryluk (0–1)	—	1,332	15–0	—
February 20	Middle Tennessee; Florida Tournament	No. 5	Katie Seashole Pressly Stadium; Gainesville, FL	8–0 ^{(5)}	**Stevens** (2–0)	Klaiber (0–1)	—	1,332	16–0	—
February 21	Lindenwood; Florida Tournament	No. 5	Katie Seashole Pressly Stadium; Gainesville, FL	8–0 ^{(5)}	**Brown** (5–0)	Owens (0–1)	—	1,600	17–0	—
February 21	Longwood; Florida Tournament	No. 5	Katie Seashole Pressly Stadium; Gainesville, FL	12–4 ^{(6)}	**Miller** (3–0)	Chapin (0–1)	—	1,600	18–0	—
February 22	Middle Tennessee; Florida Tournament	No. 5	Katie Seashole Pressly Stadium; Gainesville, FL	7–0	**Rothrock** (8–0)	Hall (0–1)	—	1,219	19–0	—
February 26	vs. Cal; Judi Garman Classic	No. 4	Anderson Family Field; Fullerton, CA	8–0 ^{(5)}	**Rothrock** (9–0)	McGowan (0–1)	—	456	20–0	—
February 26	vs. East Texas A&M; Judi Garman Classic	No. 4	Anderson Family Field; Fullerton, CA	28–0 ^{(5)}	**Stevens** (3–0)	Masters (0–1)	—	435	21–0	—
February 27	vs. No. 9 UCLA; Judi Garman Classic	No. 4	Anderson Family Field; Fullerton, CA	12–15	Cable (1–0)	**Rothrock** (9–1)	—	857	21–1	—
February 27	vs. LMU; Judi Garman Classic	No. 4	Anderson Family Field; Fullerton, CA	7–5	**Rothrock** (10–1)	O'dell (0–1)	—	560	22–1	—
February 28	vs. Oregon State; Judi Garman Classic	No. 4	Anderson Family Field; Fullerton, CA	21–1 ^{(5)}	**Rothrock** (11–1)	Murray (0–1)	—	654	23–1	—

March (10–3)
Date	Opponent	Rank	Stadium Site	Score	Win	Loss	Save	Attendance	Overall Record	SEC Record
March 7	Missouri	No. 5	Katie Seashole Pressly Stadium; Gainesville, FL	5–4	**Rothrock** (12–1)	Donahue (0–1)	—	2,029	24–1	1–0
March 8	Missouri	No. 5	Katie Seashole Pressly Stadium; Gainesville, FL	4–3 ^{(11)}	**Rothrock** (13–1)	Carr (2–3)	—	2,234	25–1	2–0
March 9	Missouri	No. 5	Katie Seashole Pressly Stadium; Gainesville, FL	5–2	**Rothrock** (14–1)	McCann (2–5)	—	1,323	26–1	3–0
March 13	at Kentucky	No. 5	John Cropp Stadium; Lexington, KY	10–2 ^{(6)}	**Rothrock** (15–1)	Haendiges (7–3)	—	1,099	27–1	4–0
March 14	at Kentucky	No. 5	John Cropp Stadium; Lexington, KY	9–0 ^{(5)}	**Oxley** (2–0)	Nutter (7–2)	—	1,277	28–1	5–0
March 15	at Kentucky	No. 5	John Cropp Stadium; Lexington, KY	9–0 ^{(6)}	**Rothrock** (16–1)	Nutter (7–3)	—	1,222	29–1	6–0
March 20	No. 1 Tennessee	No. 5	Katie Seashole Pressly Stadium; Gainesville, FL	1–2	Mardjetko (7–0)	**Rothrock** (16–2)	Pickens (2)	2,455	29–2	6–1
March 21	No. 1 Tennessee	No. 5	Katie Seashole Pressly Stadium; Gainesville, FL	5–2	**Miller** (4–0)	Pickens (7–1)	—	2,635	30–2	7–1
March 22	No. 1 Tennessee	No. 5	Katie Seashole Pressly Stadium; Gainesville, FL	3–2	**Rothrock** (17–2)	Pickens (7–2)	—	2,164	31–2	8–1
March 25	Stetson	No. 3	Katie Seashole Pressly Stadium; Gainesville, FL	3–2	**Stevens** (4–0)	Arnold (2–2)	**Rothrock** (2)	1,227	32–2	—
March 27	at No. 10 Arkansas	No. 3	Bogle Park; Fayetteville, AR	2–6	Herron (10–2)	**Rothrock** (17–3)	Burnham (2)	2,924	32–3	8–2
March 28	at No. 10 Arkansas	No. 3	Bogle Park; Fayetteville, AR	12–6	**Oxley** (3–0)	Burnham (7–3)	**Rothrock** (3)	3,718	33–3	9–2
March 29	at No. 10 Arkansas	No. 3	Bogle Park; Fayetteville, AR	4–6	Timmerman (7–0)	**Rothrock** (17–4)	—	2,842	33–4	9–3

April (14–3)
Date	Opponent	Rank	Stadium Site	Score	Win	Loss	Save	Attendance	Overall Record	SEC Record
April 1	at Stetson	No. 5	Stetson Softball Complex; DeLand, FL	8–2	**Miller** (5–0)	Braswell (11–7)	**Oxley** (1)	483	34–4	—
April 3	No. 13 Mississippi State	No. 5	Katie Seashole Pressly Stadium; Gainesville, FL	2–0	**Rothrock** (18–4)	Goold (13–5)	—	1,693	35–4	10–3
April 4	No. 13 Mississippi State	No. 5	Katie Seashole Pressly Stadium; Gainesville, FL	5–9	Faircloth (10–3)	**Oxley** (3–1)	—	1,902	35–5	10–4
April 5	No. 13 Mississippi State presented by Campus USA	No. 5	Katie Seashole Pressly Stadium; Gainesville, FL	5–4	**Rothrock** (19–4)	Goold (13–6)	—	1,546	36–5	11–4
April 8	USF	No. 6	Katie Seashole Pressly Stadium; Gainesville, FL	4–1	**Oxley** (4–1)	Long (11–4)	—	1,415	37–5	—
April 10	at South Carolina	No. 6	South Carolina Softball Complex; Columbia, SC	5–0	**Rothrock** (20–4)	Heard (6–6)	—	1,379	38–5	12–4
April 11	at South Carolina	No. 6	South Carolina Softball Complex; Columbia, SC	15–2 ^{(5)}	**Miller** (6–0)	Heard (6–7)	—	1,586	39–5	13–4
April 12	at South Carolina	No. 6	South Carolina Softball Complex; Columbia, SC	6–1	**Rothrock** (21–4)	Heard (6–8)	—	1,249	40–5	14–4
April 15	FGCU	No. 4	Katie Seashole Pressly Stadium; Gainesville, FL	9–6	**Miller** (7-0)	Gabrielse (0-3)	**Rothrock** (4)	1,220	41–5	—
April 17	Auburn presented by Florida Dairy Farmers	No. 4	Katie Seashole Pressly Stadium; Gainesville, FL	9–1 ^{(5)}	**Rothrock** (22–4)	Geurin (5–7)	**Rothrock** (5)	1,624	42–5	15–4
April 18	Auburn; Senior Day presented by Southern Chevy	No. 4	Katie Seashole Pressly Stadium; Gainesville, FL	0–4	Harrison (11–9)	**Stevens** (4–1)	—	2,153	42–6	15–5
April 19	Auburn presented by Meldon Law	No. 4	Katie Seashole Pressly Stadium; Gainesville, FL	7–1	**Rothrock** (23–4)	Harrison (11–10)	**Rothrock** (6)	1,647	43–6	16–5
April 22	at No. 10 Florida State	No. 5	JoAnne Graf Field; Tallahassee, FL	1–3	Danley (9–1)	**Rothrock** (23–5)	—	1,738	43–7	—
April 24	No. 22 UCF	No. 5	Katie Seashole Pressly Stadium; Gainesville, FL	7–0	**Rothrock** (24–5)	Vega (16–7)	—	1,619	44–7	—
April 25	at No. 22 UCF	No. 5	UCF Softball Complex; Orlando, FL	7–0	**Miller** (8–0)	Vokoun (2–2)	—	830	45–7	—
April 28	No. 9 Florida State presented by UF Health	No. 6	Katie Seashole Pressly Stadium; Gainesville, FL	4–3	**Rothrock** (25–5)	Gaskell (2–1)	—	2,575	46–7	—
April 30	at No. 17 Georgia	No. 6	Jack Turner Softball Stadium; Athens, GA	5–3	**Rothrock** (26–5)	Roelling (14–9)	—	1,648	47–7	17–5

May (0–2)
Date	Opponent	Rank	Stadium Site	Score	Win	Loss	Save	Attendance	Overall Record	SEC Record
May 1	at No. 17 Georgia	No. 6	Jack Turner Softball Stadium; Athens, GA	9–10	Roelling (15–9)	**Miller** (8–1)	—	1,835	47–8	17–6
May 2	at No. 17 Georgia	No. 6	Jack Turner Softball Stadium; Athens, GA	1–9	Roelling (16–9)	**Rothrock** (26–6)	—	2,280	47–9	17–7

Postseason (5–3)

SEC Tournament (1–1)
Date	Opponent	Rank	Stadium Site	Score	Win	Loss	Save	Attendance	Overall Record	Tournament Record
May 7	vs. (14) Auburn	(3) No. 7	John Cropp Stadium; Lexington, KY	10–9	**Stevens** (5–1)	Herndon (5–6)	**Rothrock** (5)		48–9	1–0
May 8	vs. (2) No. 4 Alabama	(3) No. 7	John Cropp Stadium; Lexington, KY	1–9 (5)	Moten (19–4)	**Stevens** (5–2)	—		48–10	1–1

Gainesville Regional (3–0)
Date	Opponent	Rank	Stadium Site	Score	Win	Loss	Save	Attendance	Overall Record	Regional Record
May 15	Florida A&M	(6)	Katie Seashole Pressly Stadium; Gainesville, FL	12–0 (5)	**Rothrock** (27–6)	Hughes (14–6)	—	1,699	49–10	1–0
May 16	Georgia Tech	(6)	Katie Seashole Pressly Stadium; Gainesville, FL	8–0 (5)	**Rothrock** (28–6)	Watts (7–8)	—	1,745	50–10	2–0
May 17	Georgia Tech	(6)	Katie Seashole Pressly Stadium; Gainesville, FL	5–2	**Rothrock** (29–6)	Johnson (16–13)	—	1,502	51–10	3–0

Gainesville Super Regional (1–2)
Date	Opponent	Rank	Stadium Site	Score	Win	Loss	Save	Attendance	Overall Record	Super Regional Record
May 22	(11) Texas Tech	(6)	Katie Seashole Pressly Stadium; Gainesville, FL	8–10	Canady (24–5)	**Oxley** (4–2)	—	1,830	51–11	0–1
May 23	(11) Texas Tech	(6)	Katie Seashole Pressly Stadium; Gainesville, FL	10–2	**Rothrock** (30–6)	Canady (24–6)	—	2,225	52–11	1–1
May 24	(11) Texas Tech	(6)	Katie Seashole Pressly Stadium; Gainesville, FL	7–16 ^{(5)}	Canady (25–6)	**Rothrock** (30–7)	—	1,864	52–12	1–2

- Win
- Loss
- Postponement
- Bold: Gators team member
- Rankings from NFCA.
- (#) Tournament seedings in parentheses.

== Record vs. conference opponents ==
. Blank are not scheduled. Blue are home games, otherwise away.

2026 SEC softball records Source: 2026 SEC softball game results, 2026 SEC softball schedule
Tm	W–L	ALA	ARK	AUB	FLA	UGA	KEN	LSU	MSU	MIZ	OKL	OMS	SCA	TEN	TEX	TAM	Tm	SR	SW
ALA	19–5		2–1	3–0	.	.	3–0	.	.	2–1	.	3–0	3–0	1–2	2–1	.	ALA	7–1	4–0
ARK	15–9	1–2		3–0	2–1	2–1	.	.	2–1	2–1	1–2	.	.	.	2–1	.	ARK	6–2	1–0
AUB	4–20	0–3	0–3		1–2	.	2–1	0–3	.	0–3	0–3	1–2	.	.	.	.	AUB	1–7	0–5
FLA	17–7	.	1–2	2–1		1–2	3–0	.	2–1	3–0	.	.	3–0	2–1	.	.	FLA	6–2	3–0
UGA	12–12	.	1–2	.	2–1		3–0	.	2–1	2–1	0–3	.	.	.	1–2	1–2	UGA	4–4	1–1
KEN	1–23	0–3	.	1–2	0–3	0–3		.	.	.	0–3	.	.	0–3	0–3	0–3	KEN	0–8	0–7
LSU	13–11	.	.	3–0	.	.	.		1–2	2–1	1–2	3–0	2–1	0–3	.	1–2	LSU	4–4	2–1
MSU	9–15	.	1–2	.	1–2	1–2	.	2–1		.	.	1–2	2–1	1–2	.	0–3	MSU	2–6	0–1
MIZ	9–15	1–2	1–2	3–0	0–3	1–2	.	1–2	.		.	.	1–2	1–2	.	.	MIZ	1–7	1–1
OKL	20–4	.	2–1	3–0	.	3–0	3–0	2–1	.	.		3–0	.	.	2–1	2–1	OKL	8–0	4–0
OMS	6–18	0–3	.	2–1	.	.	.	0–3	2–1	.	0–3		.	2–1	0–3	0–3	OMS	3–5	0–5
SCA	7–17	0–3	.	.	0–3	.	.	1–2	1–2	2–1	.	.		1–2	0–3	2–1	SCA	2–6	0–3
TEN	16–8	2–1	.	.	1–2	.	3–0	3–0	2–1	2–1	.	1–2	2–1		.	.	TEN	6–2	2–0
TEX	16–8	1–2	1–2	.	.	2–1	3–0	.	.	.	1–2	3–0	3–0	.		2–1	TEX	6–2	3–0
TAM	16–8	.	.	.	.	2–1	3–0	2–1	3–0	.	1–2	3–0	1–2	.	1–2		TAM	5–3	3–0
Tm	W–L	ALA	ARK	AUB	FLA	UGA	KEN	LSU	MSU	MIZ	OKL	OMS	SCA	TEN	TEX	TAM	Team	SR	SW

Updated for entire regular season.
Tie breakers: TEX>TEN>TAM, SCA common. MSU>MIZ, FLA common.

== Rankings ==
Ranking movements Legend: ██ Increase in ranking ██ Decrease in ranking
	Week																
Poll	Pre	1	2	3	4	5	6	7	8	9	10	11	12	13	14	15	Final
NFCA / USA Today	6	4	4	4	5	5	5	3	5	6	4	5	6	7	9		
Softball America	10	7	8	6	8	8	7	3	7	8	7	7	9	12	12		
ESPN.com/USA Softball	6	5	5	6	8	8	8	5	7	7	7	8	8	9	10		
D1Softball	5	5	5	4	9	9	7	3	7	7	7	7	9	9	9		
