= Nusz Park =

Softball stadium in Starkville, Mississippi, United States

Nusz Field
- Interactive map of Nusz Field
- Location: Mississippi State University; Starkville, Mississippi; United States
- Coordinates: 33°27′58.9″N 88°47′34.6″W
- Owner: Mississippi State University
- Operator: Mississippi State University
- Capacity: 1,000

Construction
- Opened: 2016

Tenants
- Mississippi State Bulldogs (NCAA); 2016–present

Nusz Field is a college softball stadium in Starkville, Mississippi, on the campus of Mississippi State University. Opened in 2016, it is the home field of the Mississippi State Bulldogs of the Southeastern Conference, with a seating capacity of 1,000. Nusz Field is adjacent to the tennis and track and field facilities, and near the football practice fields and Dudy Noble Field, Polk–DeMent Stadium, at the north end of campus.

== Previous facility ==
Prior to Nusz Field, the Bulldogs played on the same site in a facility known as MSU Softball Field. Constructed in 1997, it had a single grandstand with seating for about 300.

== Current facility ==
Constructed in 2016–2017 at a cost of $6 million, Nusz Field has a seated capacity of 1,000 with standing room and other spaces for additional spectators. The facility has concourses, permanent concessions, and a press box. A fieldhouse was added in time for the 2023 season, adding 12,000 square feet of team space with locker room, meeting spaces, batting cages, and other support spaces. The stadium is named for Tommy and Terri Nusz, alumni of Mississippi State and the lead donors in the project, which also produced the tennis facility.

== Events ==
In its inaugural year, Nusz Field hosted the 2016 SEC softball tournament. The Bulldogs also hosted the 2022 Starkville Super Regional.
