= 2026 Georgia Bulldogs softball team =

American college softball season

2026 Georgia Bulldogs softball

Athens Regional champion

Knoxville Super Regional, 0–2
- Conference: Southeastern Conference

Ranking
- Coaches: No. 16
- Record: 41–20 (12–12 SEC)
- Head coach: Tony Baldwin (5th season)
- Assistant coaches: J.T. D'Amico (5th season); Chelsea Wilkinson (5th season); Mike Davenport (2nd season)
- Home stadium: Jack Turner Stadium

2026 Southeastern Conference softball standings
	Conf.				Overall
Team	W		L	PCT	W		L	PCT
No. 2 Oklahoma ‍†‍‍^{y}	20	–	4	.833	51	–	8	.864
No. 3 Alabama ‍‍‍^{y}	19	–	5	.792	52	–	7	.881
No. 9 Florida ‍‍‍^{y}	17	–	7	.708	51	–	10	.836
No. 6 Texas ‍‍‡‍^{y}	16	–	8	.667	45	–	10	.818
No. 8 Tennessee ‍‍‍^{y}	16	–	8	.667	45	–	10	.818
No. 17 Texas A&M ‍‍‍^{y}	16	–	8	.667	38	–	19	.667
No. 10 Arkansas ‍‍‍^{y}	15	–	9	.625	45	–	11	.804
No. 18 LSU ‍‍‍^{y}	13	–	11	.542	40	–	17	.702
No. 16 Georgia ‍‍‍^{y}	12	–	12	.500	41	–	18	.695
No. 20 Mississippi State ‍‍‍^{y}	9	–	15	.375	41	–	18	.695
Missouri ‍‍‍	9	–	15	.375	28	–	29	.491
South Carolina ‍‍‍^{y}	7	–	17	.292	32	–	28	.533
Ole Miss ‍‍‍^{y}	6	–	18	.250	34	–	24	.586
Auburn ‍‍‍	4	–	20	.167	27	–	28	.491
Kentucky ‍‍‍	1	–	23	.042	26	–	29	.473
† – Conference champion ‡ – Tournament champion y – Invited to the NCAA tournament As of May 17, 2026; Rankings from NFCA/USA Today

The 2026 Georgia Bulldogs softball team represented the University of Georgia during the 2026 NCAA Division I softball season. The team was coached by Tony Baldwin in his fifth season and played their home games at Jack Turner Stadium in Athens, Georgia.

== Previous season ==
The Bulldogs finished the 2025 season 35–23 overall, and 7–16 in the SEC, finishing in 12th place in the conference. In the 2025 SEC tournament, the Bulldogs defeated Kentucky in the first round, before falling to Arkansas in the second round. They were invited to play in the 2025 NCAA Division I softball tournament and were placed in the Gainesville Super Regional. During the NCAA tournament, they won the Durham Regional and advanced, where they were eliminated by Florida.

== Roster and personnel ==
=== Roster ===
2026 Georgia Bulldogs roster
Pitchers: 11 – Addisen Fisher – Sophomore; 30 – Destin Howard – Senior; 33 – Maddie Johnson – Sophomore; 34 – Randi Roelling – Junior; 43 – Ada Little – Freshman; 44 – Presley Harrison – Freshman; Catchers: 7 – Sarah Gordon – Senior; 56 – Marisa Miller – Senior; Outfielders: 1 – Delani Sullivan – Junior; 5 – Natalie Donaldson – Freshman; 12 – Natalie Ray – Senior	Infielders: 3 – Tyah Charlton – Sophomore; 4 – Tyler Ellison – Senior; 6 – Brooke Smith – Freshman; 13 – Katelin Smith – Freshman; 22 – Emily Digby – Junior; 32 – Gabi Novickas – Freshman; 42 – Keirstin Roose – Graduate; 55 – Bailey Lindemuth – Sophomore; Utility: 2 – Jaydyn Goodwin – Junior; 8 – Mua Williams – Sophomore; 10 – Mollie Mitchell – Sophomore; 17 – Emma Castorri – Junior; 24 – Esther White – Sophomore

=== Coaching staff ===
2026 Georgia Bulldogs coaching staff
- Tony Baldwin – Head coach
- J.T. D'Amico – Associate head coach
- Chelsea Wilkinson – Assistant coach
- Mike Davenport – Assistant coach

== Schedule ==
2026 Georgia Bulldogs softball game log (41–20)
Regular season (36–17)

February (16–5)
Date	Opponent	Rank	Site	Score	Win	Loss	Save	Attendance	Overall Record	SEC Record
February 6	Missouri State; Red and Black Showcase	No. 20	Jack Turner Stadium; Athens, GA	10–1^{5}	**Harrison** (1–0)	Brewster (0–1)	—	500	1–0	–
February 6	Fordham; Red and Black Showcase	No. 20	Jack Turner Stadium	7–1	**Fisher** (1–0)	Simcoe (0–1)	—	500	2–0	–
February 7	Fordham; Red and Black Showcase	No. 20	Jack Turner Stadium	5–1	**Roelling** (1–0)	Gaisior (0–1)	**Harrison** (1)	500	3–0	–
February 7	Belmont; Red and Black Showcase	No. 20	Jack Turner Stadium	12–0^{5}	**Fisher** (2–0)	Willis (0–1)	—	500	4–0	–
February 8	Belmont; Red and Black Showcase	No. 20	Jack Turner Stadium	1–2	Johnson (2–0)	**Roelling** (1–1)	–	200	4–1	–
February 12	vs. Oklahoma State; Shriners Children’s Clearwater Invitational	No. 20	Eddie C. Moore Complex; Clearwater, FL	5–6	Crandall (2–0)	**Johnson** (0–1)	Meylan (1)	–	4–2	–
February 12	vs. No. 11 Nebraska; Shriners Children’s Clearwater Invitational	No. 20	Eddie C. Moore Complex	6–5	**Fisher** (3–0)	Jensen (2–1)	**Little** (1)	2,141	5–2	–
February 13	vs. NC State; Shriners Children’s Clearwater Invitational	No. 20	Eddie C. Moore Complex	16–2^{5}	**Roelling** (2–1)	Wyman (0–2)	–	–	6–2	–
February 13	vs. UCF; Shriners Children’s Clearwater Invitational	No. 20	Eddie C. Moore Complex	13–5^{5}	**Fisher** (4–0)	Elkins (0–1)	–	–	7–2	–
February 14	vs. Northwestern; Shriners Children’s Clearwater Invitational	No. 20	Eddie C. Moore Complex	8–3	**Roelling** (3–1)	Grudzielanek (1–2)	–	–	8–2	–
February 14	vs. Duke; Shriners Children’s Clearwater Invitational	No. 20	Eddie C. Moore Complex	9–1^{5}	**Fisher** (5–0)	Wheeler (2–1)	–	–	9–2	–
February 18	Samford	No. 16	Jack Turner Stadium	14–8	**Fisher** (6–0)	Turner (2–2)	–	500	10–2	–
February 20	Seton Hall; Georgia Classic	No. 16	Jack Turner Stadium	9–1^{5}	**Roelling** (4–1)	Kreusche (0–2)	–	500	11–2	–
February 20	Utah State; Georgia Classic	No. 16	Jack Turner Stadium	4–1	**Little** (1–0)	Limosnero (0–1)	**Roelling** (1)	500	12–2	–
February 21	No. 17 Virginia Tech; Georgia Classic	No. 16	Jack Turner Stadium	3–9	Mazzarone (3–1)	**Howard** (0–1)	–	1000	12–3	–
February 21	Utah State; Georgia Classic	No. 16	Jack Turner Stadium	11–2	**Roelling** (5–1)	Lish (0–1)	–	500	13–3	–
February 22	No. 17 Virginia Tech; Georgia Classic	No. 16	Jack Turner Stadium	3–9	Carrico (3–0)	**Roelling** (5–2)	–	500	13–4	–
February 25	No. 25 Clemson	No. 15	Jack Turner Stadium	1–10^{6}	Maness (5–2)	**Roelling** (5–3)	–	1,000	13–5	–
February 27	South Alabama; Bulldog Classic	No. 15	Jack Turner Stadium	8–0^{5}	**Roelling** (6–3)	Harrison (6–3)	–	500	14–5	–
February 28	South Alabama; Bulldog Classic	No. 15	Jack Turner Stadium	9–0^{5}	**Harrison** (2–0)	Scapin (2–3)	–	500	15–5	–
February 28	UNC Wilmington; Bulldog Classic	No. 15	Jack Turner Stadium	9–1^{5}	**Howard** (1–1)	Hamilton (3–1)	–	1,000	16–5	–

March (11–3)
Date	Opponent	Rank	Site	Score	Win	Loss	Save	Attendance	Overall Record	SEC Record
March 1	UNC Wilmington; Bulldog Classic	No. 15	Jack Turner Stadium	9–1^{5}	**Roelling** (7–3)	Huddleston (2–5)	–	500	17–5	–
March 4	Georgia State	No. 15	Jack Turner Stadium	9–1^{5}	**Little** (2–0)	Bower (2–3)	–	500	18–5	–
March 6	at No. 7 Arkansas	No. 15	Bogle Park; Fayetteville, AR	7–2	**Roelling** (8–3)	Herron (8–1)	–	2,402	19–5	1–0
March 7	at No. 7 Arkansas	No. 15	Bogle Park	6–7	Burnham (5–1)	**Little** (2–1)	Herron (2)	3,161	19–6	1–1
March 8	at No. 7 Arkansas	No. 15	Bogle Park	0–6	Herron (9–1)	**Roelling** (8–4)	–	2,717	19–7	1–2
March 10	West Georgia	No. 15	Jack Turner Stadium	8–0	**Howard** (2–1)	Hardison (3–4)	–	1,000	20–7	–
March 18	Georgia Tech	No. 15	Jack Turner Stadium	5–1	**Fisher** (7–0)	Johnson (8–8)	–	1,250	21–7	–
March 20	No. 11 Mississippi State	No. 15	Jack Turner Stadium	6–3	**Little** (3–1)	Goold (11–3)	**Fisher** (1)	1,500	22–7	2–2
March 21	No. 11 Mississippi State	No. 15	Jack Turner Stadium	2–3	Faircloth (9–2)	**Fisher** (7–1)	–	2,000	22–8	2–3
March 22	No. 11 Mississippi State	No. 15	Jack Turner Stadium	7–4	**Roelling** (9–4)	Goold (11–4)	–	2,000	23–8	3–3
March 25	Mercer	No. 15	Jack Turner Stadium	18–1^{(5)}	**Harrison** (3–0)	Roark (2–6)	–	1,000	24–8	–
March 27	at Kentucky	No. 15	John Cropp Stadium; Lexington, KY	10–2^{(6)}	**Roelling** (10–4)	Oslanzi (3–4)	–	1,064	25–8	4–3
March 28	at Kentucky	No. 15	John Cropp Stadium	11–1^{(5)}	**Fisher** (8–1)	Haendiges (8–5)	–	1,223	26–8	5–3
March 29	at Kentucky	No. 15	John Cropp Stadium	5–0	**Roelling** (11–4)	Hammond (2–2)	–	1,252	27–8	6–3

April (7–9)
Date	Opponent	Rank	Site	Score	Win	Loss	Save	Attendance	Overall Record	SEC Record
April 2	at No. 16 Texas A&M	No. 15	Davis Diamond; College Station, TX	2–3	Lessentine (10–3)	**Fisher** (8–2)	Peters (2)	1,762	27–9	6–4
April 3	at No. 16 Texas A&M	No. 15	Davis Diamond	10–6	**Little** (4–1)	Munnerlyn (3–4)	**Fisher** (2)	2,140	28–9	7–4
April 3	at No. 16 Texas A&M	No. 15	Davis Diamond	1–2	Lessentine (11–3)	**Fisher** (8–3)	Peters (3)	1,881	28–10	7–5
April 8	USC Upstate	No. 16	Jack Turner Stadium	19–6^{(5)}	**Johnson** (1–1)	Brown (1–2)	—	1,500	29–10	—
April 10	Missouri	No. 16	Jack Turner Stadium	8–0^{(8)}	**Roelling** (12–4)	Harrison (9–6)	—	1,777	30–10	8–5
April 11	Missouri	No. 16	Jack Turner Stadium	3–4	McCann (7–8)	**Fisher** (8–4)	Carr (4)	1,817	30–11	8–6
April 12	Missouri	No. 16	Jack Turner Stadium	4–0	**Roelling** (13–4)	Harrison (9–7)	—	1,553	31–11	9–6
April 15	at Kennesaw State	No. 15	Bailey Park; Kennesaw, GA	7–5	**Fisher** (9–4)	Jannakos (6–12)	**Harrison** (3)	933	32–11	—
April 18	No. 5 Texas	No. 15	Jack Turner Stadium	5–7	Gutierrez (7–1)	**Roelling** (13–5)	Kavan (3)	2,289	32–12	9–7
April 19	No. 5 Texas	No. 15	Jack Turner Stadium	4–2	**Fisher** (10–4)	Wells (5–3)	—	2,663	33–12	10–7
April 20	No. 5 Texas	No. 15	Jack Turner Stadium	3–6	Kavan (16–3)	**Roelling** (13–6)	—	1,785	33–13	10–8
April 22	Georgia Southern	No. 15	Jack Turner Stadium	0–8^{(5)}	**Roelling** (14–6)	Croft (2–3)	—	1,305	34–13	—
April 24	at No. 1 Oklahoma	No. 15	Love's Field; Norman, OK	2–10^{(6)}	Lowry (20–2)	**Fisher** (10–5)	—	4,298	34–14	10–9
April 25	at No. 1 Oklahoma	No. 15	Love's Field	1–3	Guachino (13–1)	**Roelling** (14–7)	—	4,504	34–15	10–10
April 26	at No. 1 Oklahoma	No. 15	Love's Field	5–6	Guachino (14–1)	**Roelling** (14–8)	—	4,302	34–16	10–11
April 30	No. 6 Florida	No. 17	Jack Turner Stadium	3–5	Rothrock (26–5)	**Roelling** (14–9)	—	1,648	34–17	10–12

May (2–0)
Date	Opponent	Rank	Site	Score	Win	Loss	Save	Attendance	Overall Record	SEC Record
May 1	No. 6 Florida	No. 17	Jack Turner Stadium	10–9	**Roelling** (15–9)	Miller (8–1)	—	1,835	35–17	11–12
May 2	No. 6 Florida	No. 17	Jack Turner Stadium	9–1^{(5)}	**Roelling** (16–9)	Rothrock (26–6)	—	2,280	36–17	12–12

Postseason (5–3)

SEC Tournament (2–1)
Date	Opponent	Seed	Site	Score	Win	Loss	Save	Attendance	Overall Record	Tournament Record
May 6	vs. (8) No. 18 LSU	(9) No. 17	John Cropp Stadium; Lexington, KY	**W** 7–3	**Roelling** (17–9)	Heavener (12–8)	—	1,942	37–17	1–0
May 7	vs. (1) No. 1 Oklahoma	(9) No. 17	John Cropp Stadium	**W** 10–5	**Harrison** (4–0)	Lowry (21–3)	—	2,069	38–17	2–0
May 8	vs. (4) No. 10 Texas	(9) No. 17	John Cropp Stadium	**L** 4–5	Gutierrez (8–3)	**Harrison** (4–1)	—	2,328	38–18	2–1

Athens Regional (3–0)
Date	Opponent	Seed	Site	Score	Win	Loss	Save	Attendance	Overall Record	Regional Record
May 15	(4) Charleston	(1) No. 16	Jack Turner Stadium	**W** 5–2	**Fisher** (11–5)	Mathis (16–9)	—	1,890	39–18	1–0
May 16	(3) UNC Greensboro	(1) No. 16	Jack Turner Stadium	**W** 8–0^{5}	**Roelling** (18–9)	Shroyer (22–7)	—	1,239	40–18	2–0
May 17	(2) Clemson	(1) No. 16	Jack Turner Stadium	**W** 5–0	**Fisher** (12–5)	Dunning (9–10)	—	1,303	41–18	3–0

Knoxville Super Regional (0–2)
Date	Opponent	Seed	Site	Score	Win	Loss	Save	Attendance	Overall Record	Super Reg. Record
May 21	at (7) No. 8 Tennessee	(10) No. 16	Sherri Parker Lee Stadium; Knoxville, TN	**L** 1–3	Pickens (15–7)	**Fisher** (12–6)	—	1,899	41–19	0–1
May 22	at (7) No. 8 Tennessee	(10) No. 16	Sherri Parker Lee Stadium	**L** 1–2	Mardjetko (14–2)	**Roelling** (18–10)	—	2,038	41–20	0–2

- Win
- Loss
- Postponement
- Bold: Bulldogs team member
- Rankings from NFCA:
- (#) Tournament seedings in parentheses.

== Record vs. conference opponents ==
. Blank are not scheduled. Blue are home games, otherwise away.

2026 SEC softball records Source: 2026 SEC softball game results, 2026 SEC softball schedule
Tm	W–L	ALA	ARK	AUB	FLA	UGA	KEN	LSU	MSU	MIZ	OKL	OMS	SCA	TEN	TEX	TAM	Tm	SR	SW
ALA	19–5		2–1	3–0	.	.	3–0	.	.	2–1	.	3–0	3–0	1–2	2–1	.	ALA	7–1	4–0
ARK	15–9	1–2		3–0	2–1	2–1	.	.	2–1	2–1	1–2	.	.	.	2–1	.	ARK	6–2	1–0
AUB	4–20	0–3	0–3		1–2	.	2–1	0–3	.	0–3	0–3	1–2	.	.	.	.	AUB	1–7	0–5
FLA	17–7	.	1–2	2–1		1–2	3–0	.	2–1	3–0	.	.	3–0	2–1	.	.	FLA	6–2	3–0
UGA	12–12	.	1–2	.	2–1		3–0	.	2–1	2–1	0–3	.	.	.	1–2	1–2	UGA	4–4	1–1
KEN	1–23	0–3	.	1–2	0–3	0–3		.	.	.	0–3	.	.	0–3	0–3	0–3	KEN	0–8	0–7
LSU	13–11	.	.	3–0	.	.	.		1–2	2–1	1–2	3–0	2–1	0–3	.	1–2	LSU	4–4	2–1
MSU	9–15	.	1–2	.	1–2	1–2	.	2–1		.	.	1–2	2–1	1–2	.	0–3	MSU	2–6	0–1
MIZ	9–15	1–2	1–2	3–0	0–3	1–2	.	1–2	.		.	.	1–2	1–2	.	.	MIZ	1–7	1–1
OKL	20–4	.	2–1	3–0	.	3–0	3–0	2–1	.	.		3–0	.	.	2–1	2–1	OKL	8–0	4–0
OMS	6–18	0–3	.	2–1	.	.	.	0–3	2–1	.	0–3		.	2–1	0–3	0–3	OMS	3–5	0–5
SCA	7–17	0–3	.	.	0–3	.	.	1–2	1–2	2–1	.	.		1–2	0–3	2–1	SCA	2–6	0–3
TEN	16–8	2–1	.	.	1–2	.	3–0	3–0	2–1	2–1	.	1–2	2–1		.	.	TEN	6–2	2–0
TEX	16–8	1–2	1–2	.	.	2–1	3–0	.	.	.	1–2	3–0	3–0	.		2–1	TEX	6–2	3–0
TAM	16–8	.	.	.	.	2–1	3–0	2–1	3–0	.	1–2	3–0	1–2	.	1–2		TAM	5–3	3–0
Tm	W–L	ALA	ARK	AUB	FLA	UGA	KEN	LSU	MSU	MIZ	OKL	OMS	SCA	TEN	TEX	TAM	Team	SR	SW

Updated for entire regular season.
Tie breakers: TEX>TEN>TAM, SCA common. MSU>MIZ, FLA common.

== Rankings ==
Ranking movements Legend: ██ Increase in ranking ██ Decrease in ranking т = Tied with team above or below
	Week															
Poll	Pre	1	2	3	4	5	6	7	8	9	10	11	12	13	14	Final
NFCA / USA Today	20	20	16	15	15	15	15	15	15	16	15	15	17	17	16	
Softball America	15	19	9	12	12	14	11	11	10	14	13	13	15	14	14*	
ESPN.com/USA Softball	15	17	12	11	12т	13	13	11	11	14	13	11	14	13	11	
D1Softball	17	19	11	11	15	14	14	12	12	13	12	12	13	12	12*	

*A new poll was not released for this week, so for comparison purposes, the previous week's ranking is inserted in this week's slot.
