= Kentucky Wildcats softball =

Softball team of the University of Kentucky

Kentucky Wildcats
- 2026 Kentucky Wildcats softball team
- Founded: 1997 (29 years ago)
- University: University of Kentucky
- Athletic director: J Batt
- Head coach: Rachel Lawson (19th season)
- Conference: SEC
- Location: Lexington, Kentucky, US
- Home stadium: John Cropp Stadium (capacity: 2,117)
- Nickname: Wildcats
- Colors: Blue and white

NCAA WCWS appearances
- 2014

NCAA super regional appearances
- 2011, 2013, 2014, 2015, 2017, 2018, 2019, 2021

NCAA Tournament appearances
- 2009, 2010, 2011, 2012, 2013, 2014, 2015, 2016, 2017, 2018, 2019, 2021, 2022, 2023, 2024, 2025

The Kentucky Wildcats softball team represents the University of Kentucky in the sport of softball. The Kentucky Wildcats compete in Division I of the National Collegiate Athletic Association (NCAA) and the Southeastern Conference (SEC). The Wildcats play their home games at John Cropp Stadium on the university's Lexington, Kentucky campus, and are currently led by head coach Rachel Lawson. In the history of the Wildcats softball program, the team has made appearances in sixteen NCAA Division I Softball Championship, eight Super Regionals, and one Women's College World Series (WCWS).

== Head coaches ==
Name	Years	Record
Beth Pruit	1997–2004	181–297–1 (52–146 SEC)
Eileen Schmidt	2005–2007	61–108 (12–75 SEC)
Rachel Lawson	2008–present	495–297 (155–173 SEC)

== History ==
The University of Kentucky softball team had their inaugural season in 1997.

University of Kentucky Athletic Director Mitch Barnhart hired Rachel Lawson in July 2007. Since her hire, Lawson has guided UK to eight NCAA Super Regionals including an appearance in the 2014 College World Series, the program's first.

In her fourteen seasons at Kentucky, Lawson has an overall win–loss record of 495–297, making her the winningest head coach in school history and already has more wins in SEC play than UK had total as a program when she took over in 2008. UK also finished 2016 in the top 14 of both collegiate softball rankings for the third time in school history with eleven wins over ranked teams.

Another accomplishment since Lawson's hire in 2008 is the construction of John Cropp Stadium. The facility cost $9.5 million, and debuted for the 2013 season. UK hosted the 2013 SEC Tournament as well as an NCAA regional, another first for the program. Since 2013, UK has hosted an NCAA regional in 2013, 2014, 2016–2019, and 2021.

== Year-by-year results ==
Season	Coach	Record	SEC record	Notes
1997	Beth Pruit	11–44		
1998	Beth Pruit	19–43	6–22	
1999	Beth Pruit	23–44	6–22	
2000	Beth Pruit	36–29	15–13	
2001	Beth Pruit	27–34	10–18	
2002	Beth Pruit	24–32	6–21	
2003	Beth Pruit	16–40	3–26	
2004	Beth Pruit	25–31–1	6–24	
2005	Eileen Schmidt	20–41	4–25	
2006	Eileen Schmidt	21–36	4–26	
2007	Eileen Schmidt	20–31	4–24	
2008	Rachel Lawson	17–37	3–25	
2009	Rachel Lawson	34–23	13–14	NCAA Regional
2010	Rachel Lawson	32–27	13–15	NCAA tournament
2011	Rachel Lawson	40–16	14–9	NCAA Super Regional
2012	Rachel Lawson	30–30	15–13	NCAA tournament
2013	Rachel Lawson	41–21	13–11	NCAA Super Regional Hosted SEC Tournament & Regional
2014	Rachel Lawson	50–19	13–11	Women's College World Series Hosted Regional
2015	Rachel Lawson	32–26	5–19	NCAA Super Regional
2016	Rachel Lawson	46–14	17–7	NCAA tournament Hosted Regional
2017	Rachel Lawson	39–19	12–12	NCAA Super Regional Hosted Regional
2018	Rachel Lawson	35–21	8–15	NCAA Super Regional Hosted Regional
2019	Rachel Lawson	36–24	14–10	NCAA Super Regional Hosted Regional
2020	Rachel Lawson	20–4	2–1	Season cancelled due to COVID-19 pandemic
2021	Rachel Lawson	43–16	13–11	NCAA Super Regional Hosted Regional
2022	Rachel Lawson	37–19	13–11	NCAA Tournament
2023	Rachel Lawson	33–22–1	10–14	NCAA Tournament
2024	Rachel Lawson	30–22	8–16	NCAA Tournament
2025	Rachel Lawson	31-28	7-17	NCAA Tournament

== All-Americans ==
Player	Year(s)	Team	Organization	Notes
Molly Johnson	2009	2nd	Louisville Slugger/NFCA	
Kelsey Nunley	2016	1st	NFCA	
Katie Reed	2017	3rd	NFCA	
Abbey Cheek	2019	1st	NFCA	Unanimous
Kayla Kowalik	2021	1st	NFCA	
Erin Coffel	2022, 2023	2nd	NFCA	

== Other Awards ==
Player	Year(s)	Team	Organization
Molly Johnson	2010	2nd	Senior CLASS Award
Griffin Joiner	2015	1st	Senior CLASS Award
Kelsey Nunley	2016	1st	Senior CLASS Award, SEC Pitcher of the Year
Abbey Cheek	2019		NFCA National Player of the Year, SEC Player of the Year
