= 2026 Big Ten softball tournament =

College softball tournament in Maryland

- Teams: 12
- Format: Single-elimination tournament
- Finals site: Maryland Softball Stadium; College Park, Maryland
- Champions: Nebraska (2nd title)
- Runner-up: UCLA (2nd title game)
- Winning coach: Rhonda Revelle (2nd title)
- Television: BTN

2026 Big Ten Conference softball standings
	Conf.				Overall
Team	W		L	PCT	W		L	PCT
No. 1 Nebraska ‍†‍‡‍^{y}	23	–	1	.958	46	–	6	.885
No. 12 Oregon ‍‍‍^{y}	20	–	4	.833	40	–	12	.769
No. 5 UCLA ‍‍‍^{y}	20	–	4	.833	47	–	8	.855
Indiana ‍‍‍^{y}	17	–	7	.708	42	–	14	.750
Northwestern ‍‍‍	16	–	8	.667	29	–	21	.580
Washington ‍‍‍^{y}	16	–	8	.667	36	–	18	.667
Wisconsin ‍‍‍^{y}	14	–	10	.583	32	–	19	.627
Ohio State ‍‍‍	13	–	11	.542	26	–	27	.491
Michigan ‍‍‍^{y}	11	–	13	.458	34	–	20	.630
Penn State ‍‍‍	11	–	13	.458	33	–	21	.611
Purdue ‍‍‍	11	–	13	.458	34	–	20	.630
Iowa ‍‍‍	7	–	17	.292	27	–	27	.500
Minnesota ‍‍‍	7	–	17	.292	16	–	36	.308
Rutgers ‍‍‍	6	–	18	.250	27	–	27	.500
Maryland ‍‍‍	5	–	19	.208	19	–	29	.396
Michigan State ‍‍‍	3	–	20	.130	17	–	34	.333
Illinois ‍‍‍	3	–	20	.130	15	–	39	.278
† – Conference champion ‡ – Tournament champion y – Invited to the NCAA Tournament; As of May 9, 2026; Rankings from NFCA/USA Today

The 2026 Big Ten softball tournament was held at Maryland Softball Stadium in College Park, Maryland from May 6 through May 9, 2026. As the tournament winner, Nebraska earned the Big Ten Conference's automatic bid to the 2026 NCAA Division I softball tournament. All games of the tournament were aired on BTN.

== Seeds ==
The top 12 Big Ten schools participate in the tournament. Teams are seeded by conference record, with the top four teams receiving a first-round bye.

Seed	School	W–L	Pct	GB No. 1
1	Nebraska	23–1	.958	—
2	Oregon	20–4	.833	3
3	UCLA	20–4	.833	3
4	Indiana	17–7	.708	6
5	Washington	16–8	.667	7
6	Northwestern	16–8	.667	7
7	Wisconsin	14–10	.583	9
8	Ohio State	13–11	.542	10
9	Michigan	11–13	.458	12
10	Purdue	11–13	.458	12
11	Penn State	11–13	.458	12
12	Minnesota	7–17	.292	16
DNQ	Iowa	7–17	.292	16
DNQ	Rutgers	6–18	.250	17
DNQ	Maryland	5–19	.208	18
DNQ	Michigan State	3–20	.130	19
DNQ	Illinois	3–20	.130	19

== Schedule ==
Game	Time*	Matchup^{#}	Score	Television
First Round – Wednesday, May 6
1	11:00 a.m.	No. 12 Minnesota vs. No. 5 Washington	2–4	BTN
2	1:30 p.m.	No. 9 Michigan vs. No. 8 Ohio State	9–0^{(5)}	BTN
3	4:30 p.m.	No. 10 Purdue vs. No. 7 Wisconsin	3–4	BTN
4	7:00 p.m.	No. 11 Penn State vs. No. 6 Northwestern	11–5	BTN
Quarterfinals – Thursday, May 7
5	11:00 a.m.	No. 4 Indiana vs. No. 5 Washington	9–2	BTN
6	1:30 p.m.	No. 1 Nebraska vs. No. 9 Michigan	4–2	BTN
7	4:30 p.m.	No. 2 Oregon vs. No. 7 Wisconsin	9–11	BTN
8	7:00 p.m.	No. 3 UCLA vs. No. 11 Penn State	6–1	BTN
Semifinals – Friday, May 8
9	5:00 p.m.	No. 4 Indiana vs. No. 1 Nebraska	0–5	BTN
10	7:30 p.m.	No. 7 Wisconsin vs. No. 3 UCLA	5–19^{(5)}	BTN
Championship – Saturday, May 9
11	4:00 p.m.	No. 1 Nebraska vs. No. 3 UCLA	7–2	BTN
*Game times in EDT. # – Rankings denote tournament seed.

== Tournament ==
1st Round; May 6th BTN
12	Minnesota	2
5	Washington	4
9	Michigan	9^{(5)}
8	Ohio State	0
10	Purdue	3
7	Wisconsin	4
11	Penn State	11
6	Northwestern	5

Quarterfinals; May 7th BTN
4	Indiana	9
5	Washington	2
1	Nebraska	4
9	Michigan	2
2	Oregon	9
7	Wisconsin	11
3	UCLA	6
11	Penn State	1

Semifinals; May 8th BTN
4	Indiana	0
1	Nebraska	5
7	Wisconsin	5
3	UCLA	19^{(5)}

Finals; May 9th BTN
1	Nebraska	7
3	UCLA	2
