= 2026 Michigan Wolverines softball team =

American college softball season

2026 Michigan Wolverines softball

NCAA Norman Regional
- Conference: Big Ten Conference
- Record: 36–22 (11–13 Big Ten)
- Head coach: Bonnie Tholl (4th season)
- Assistant coaches: Jennifer Brundage (28th season); Amanda Chidester (4th season); Carmyn Greenwood (1st season)
- Home stadium: Alumni Field

2026 Big Ten Conference softball standings
	Conf.				Overall
Team	W		L	PCT	W		L	PCT
No. 1 Nebraska ‍†‍‡‍^{y}	23	–	1	.958	52	–	8	.867
No. 12 Oregon ‍‍‍^{y}	20	–	4	.833	41	–	14	.745
No. 5 UCLA ‍‍‍^{y}	20	–	4	.833	53	–	10	.841
Indiana ‍‍‍^{y}	17	–	7	.708	43	–	16	.729
Northwestern ‍‍‍	16	–	8	.667	29	–	21	.580
Washington ‍‍‍^{y}	16	–	8	.667	37	–	20	.649
Wisconsin ‍‍‍^{y}	14	–	10	.583	33	–	21	.611
Ohio State ‍‍‍	13	–	11	.542	26	–	27	.491
Michigan ‍‍‍^{y}	11	–	13	.458	36	–	22	.621
Penn State ‍‍‍	11	–	13	.458	33	–	21	.611
Purdue ‍‍‍	11	–	13	.458	34	–	20	.630
Iowa ‍‍‍	7	–	17	.292	27	–	27	.500
Minnesota ‍‍‍	7	–	17	.292	16	–	36	.308
Rutgers ‍‍‍	6	–	18	.250	27	–	27	.500
Maryland ‍‍‍	5	–	19	.208	19	–	29	.396
Michigan State ‍‍‍	3	–	20	.130	17	–	34	.333
Illinois ‍‍‍	3	–	20	.130	15	–	39	.278
† – Conference champion ‡ – Tournament champion y – Invited to the NCAA Tournament; As of May 31, 2026; Rankings from NFCA/USA Today

The 2026 Michigan Wolverines softball team was an American college softball team that represented the University of Michigan during the 2026 NCAA Division I softball season. The Wolverines were led by head coach Bonnie Tholl in her fourth season, and played their home games at Alumni Field in Ann Arbor, Michigan.

== Previous season ==
The Wolverines finished the 2024 season 39–21 overall, and 11–11 in the Big Ten. They won the 2025 Big Ten tournament and received an automatic bid to the 2025 NCAA Division I softball tournament and were eliminated in the second round by UCF.

== Roster ==
2026 Michigan Wolverines softball team
Players
Coaches

#	Pos.	Name	Bats/throws	Height	Year	High school/junior college	Home town
1	INF	Kiley Carr	L/R	5 ft 4 in (1.63 m)	Fr	Allen Park	Allen Park, MI
2	U	Lauren Putz	L/R	5 ft 7 in (1.7 m)	So	Xavier College Preparatory	Phoenix, AZ
3	OF	Megan Beemer	L/L	5 ft 5 in (1.65 m)	So	Hudsonville	Hudsonville, MI
4	C	Rachel Del Busto	R/R	5 ft 8 in (1.73 m)	Fr	Eastlake	Eastlake, CA
5	RHP	Grayson LaMarche	R/R	5 ft 11 in (1.8 m)	Fr	Escanaba	Escanaba, MI
7	RHP	Maddie Erickson	L/R	5 ft 5 in (1.65 m)	Sr	Wilsonville	Wilsonville, OR
8	INF	Madi Ramey	L/R	5 ft 6 in (1.68 m)	Sr	Allen Park	Allen Park, MI
10	INF	Andee Dircks	R/R	5 ft 9 in (1.75 m)	So	Chapin	Chapin, SC
11	U	Erin Hoehn	R/R	5 ft 7 in (1.7 m)	Jr	North Posey	Poseyville, IN
12	INF	Siena Snyder	R/R	5 ft 9 in (1.75 m)	Fr	Parkway West	St. Louis, MO
13	OF	Jenissa Conway	R/R	5 ft 8 in (1.73 m)	Jr	Marysville	Olivehurst, CA
14	INF	Janelle Ilacqua	R/R	5 ft 5 in (1.65 m)	Sr	Catawba Ridge	Fort Mill, SC
15	U	Haley Ferguson	R/R	5 ft 5 in (1.65 m)	So	Beavercreek	Fairborn, OH
16	OF	Cece Thorington	R/R	5 ft 7 in (1.7 m)	So	Pinckney	Pinckney, MI
17	INF	Lexi Dellamonica	R/R	5 ft 6 in (1.68 m)	Jr	Queen Creek	Queen Creek, AZ
18	C	Sydney Hastings	R/R	5 ft 10 in (1.78 m)	Fr	Saline	Saline, MI
19	RHP	Reganne Bennett	R/R	5 ft 10 in (1.78 m)	Jr	Novi	Novi, MI
20	U	Lilly Vallimont	R/R	5 ft 6 in (1.68 m)	RS Jr	Trenton	Trenton, MI
21	RHP	Kat Meyers	R/R	5 ft 8 in (1.73 m)	So	Anthony Wayne	Waterville, OH
22	RHP	Gabby Ellis	L/R	5 ft 6 in (1.68 m)	Jr	Clay	Green Cove Springs, FL
23	INF	Avery Fantucci	R/R	5 ft 8 in (1.73 m)	Sr	Marist	Atlanta. GA
25	OF	Ella Stephenson	L/R	5 ft 9 in (1.75 m)	Jr	Algonac	Algonac, MI
32	INF	Lily Palko	R/R	5 ft 7 in (1.7 m)	Fr	Sharpsville	Transfer, PA
44	U	Indian Langford	L/R	5 ft 2 in (1.57 m)	Sr	Poway	Poway, CA

Head coach

Bonnie Tholl (Michigan)

Assistant coach(es)

Jennifer Brundage (UCLA)
Amanda Chidester (Michigan
Carmyn Greenwood (Louisville)

Legend

- (C) Team captain
- (S) Suspended
- (I) Ineligible
- Injured
- Current redshirt

Roster

== Schedule and results ==
2026 Michigan Wolverines Softball Game Log
Regular season (33–19)

February (14–4)
Date	Opponent	Rank	Stadium Site	Score	Win	Loss	Save	Attendance	Overall Record	B1G Record
February 6	vs. Bethune–Cookman; USF-Rawlings Invitational		USF Softball Stadium; Tampa, FL	17–0 ^{(5)}	**Meyers** (1–0)	Tohara-Yshiki (0–1)	—	1,450	1–0	—
February 6	at USF; USF-Rawlings Invitational		USF Softball Stadium; Tampa, FL	4–0	**Hoehn** (1–0)	Long (0–1)	—	1,450	2–0	—
February 7	vs. Illinois State; USF-Rawlings Invitational		USF Softball Stadium; Tampa, FL	6–2	**Ellis** (1–0)	Meshnick (1–1)	—	1,480	3–0	—
February 7	vs. No. 6 Florida; USF-Rawlings Invitational		USF Softball Stadium; Tampa, FL	1–5	Rothrock (2–0)	**Hoehn** (1–1)	—	1,679	3–1	—
February 8	vs. Kansas; USF-Rawlings Invitational		USF Softball Stadium; Tampa, FL	4–2	**Ellis** (2–0)	Barber (1–1)	—	1,853	4–1	—
February 13	vs. Pittsburgh; Houston-HCU Invitational		Husky Field; Houston, TX	3–1	**Ellis** (3–0)	Duck (0–2)	—	125	5–1	—
February 13	at Houston Christian; Houston-HCU Invitational		Husky Field; Houston, TX	6–1	**Meyers** (2–0)	Haygood (0–2)	—	125	6–1	—
February 14	vs. Incarnate Word; Houston-HCU Invitational		Husky Field; Houston, TX	20–2 ^{(5)}	**LaMarche** (1–0)	Portillo (0–1)	—	—	7–1	—
February 14	vs. Houston; Houston-HCU Invitational		Husky Field; Houston, TX	9–10	Bodeux (2–0)	**LaMarche** (1–1)	—	—	7–2	—
February 15	vs. Lafayette; Houston-HCU Invitational		Husky Field; Houston, TX	9–0 ^{(5)}	**Hoehn** (2–1)	Lecky (0–1)	—	—	8–2	—
February 20	vs. New Mexico State; Sun Devil Classic		Alberta B. Farrington Softball Stadium; Tempe, AZ	5–3	**Meyers** (3–0)	Aragon (3–3)	—	—	9–2	—
February 20	at No. 22 Arizona State; Sun Devil Classic		Alberta B. Farrington Softball Stadium; Tempe, AZ	9–8	**Ellis** (4–0)	Silva (4–1)	—	—	10–2	—
February 21	vs. Southern Utah; Sun Devil Classic		Alberta B. Farrington Softball Stadium; Tempe, AZ	3–1	**Ellis** (5–0)	Baker (1–4)	—	—	11–2	—
February 21	at No. 22 Arizona State; Sun Devil Classic		Alberta B. Farrington Softball Stadium; Tempe, AZ	0–8 ^{(6)}	Brown (4–1)	**Meyers** (3–1)	—	—	11–3	—
February 22	vs. Southern Utah; Sun Devil Classic		Alberta B. Farrington Softball Stadium; Tempe, AZ	5–3 ^{(10)}	**Ellis** (6–0)	Nielson (1–2)	—	—	12–3	—
February 27	vs. Villanova; Party at Palmer Park		Palmer Park; Charlottesville, VA	7–0	**Ellis** (7–0)	Gallant (0–6)	—	56	13–3	—
February 27	at No. 18 Virginia; Party at Palmer Park		Palmer Park; Charlottesville, VA	2–6	Layne (6–0)	**Hoehn** (2–2)	—	161	13–4	—
February 28	vs. Bucknell; Party at Palmer Park		Palmer Park; Charlottesville, VA	8–0	**Meyers** (4–1)	Power (1–4)	—	129	14–4	—

March (7–9)
Date	Opponent	Rank	Stadium Site	Score	Win	Loss	Save	Attendance	Overall Record	B1G Record
March 1	vs. Villanova; Party at Palmer Park		Palmer Park; Charlottesville, VA	9–2	**Ferguson** (1–0)	Kobryn (1–6)	—	96	15–4	—
March 1	at No. 18 Virginia; Party at Palmer Park		Palmer Park; Charlottesville, VA	4–5	Layne (7–0)	**Ellis** (7–1)	—	378	15–5	—
March 3	at Liberty		Kamphuis Field at Liberty Softball Stadium; Lynchburg, VA	8–0 ^{(5)}	**Meyers** (5–1)	Allen (2–1)	—	279	16–5	—
March 4	at James Madison		Veterans Memorial Park; Harrisonburg, VA	8–0 ^{(5)}	**Hoehn** (3–2)	Johnson (2–2)	—	153	17–5	—
March 5	vs. Boston College; Hokie Invitational		Tech Softball Park; Blacksburg, VA	7–1	**Ellis** (8–1)	Pappion (1–2)	—	150	18–5	—
March 5	at No. 11 Virginia Tech; Hokie Invitational		Tech Softball Park; Blacksburg, VA	3–5	Mazzarone (5–1)	**Meyers** (5–2)	Carrico (3)	627	18–6	—
March 6	vs. Bryant; Hokie Invitational		Tech Softball Park; Blacksburg, VA	7–1	**LaMarche** (2–1)	Tracy (2–1)	—	—	19–6	—
March 13	at No. 10 Nebraska		Bowlin Stadium; Lincoln, NE	2–5	Jensen (9–2)	**Meyers** (5–3)	Frahm (6)	1,993	19–7	0–1
March 14	at No. 10 Nebraska		Bowlin Stadium; Lincoln, NE	4–8	Frahm (7–3)	**Hoehn** (3–3)	—	—	19–8	0–2
March 15	at No. 10 Nebraska		Bowlin Stadium; Lincoln, NE	2–5	Camenzind (5–0)	**Ellis** (8–2)	Jensen (1)	2,637	19–9	0–3
March 20	Washington		Alumni Field; Ann Arbor, MI	7–9	Reimer (15–1)	**Ellis** (8–3)	Ramuno (1)	811	19–10	0–4
March 21	Washington		Alumni Field; Ann Arbor, MI	4–7	Reimer (16–1)	**Ferguson** (1–1)	—	907	19–11	0–5
March 22	Washington		Alumni Field; Ann Arbor, MI	7–10	Reimer (17–1)	**LaMarche** (2–2)	—	—	19–12	0–6
March 27	Purdue		Alumni Field; Ann Arbor, MI	9–1 ^{(5)}	**Hoehn** (4–3)	Gossett (9–6)	—	637	20–12	1–6
March 28	Purdue		Alumni Field; Ann Arbor, MI	6–13	Fontenot (8–3)	**Ellis** (8–4)	—	1,218	20–13	1–7
March 29	Purdue		Alumni Field; Ann Arbor, MI	13–5 ^{(5)}	**Hoehn** (5–3)	Perez (6–1)	—	951	21–13	2–7

April (9–6)
Date	Opponent	Rank	Stadium Site	Score	Win	Loss	Save	Attendance	Overall Record	B1G Record
April 1	Oakland		Alumni Field; Ann Arbor, MI	6–5	**Ferguson** (2–1)	Bommarito (8–5)	—	643	22–13	—
April 3	at Northwestern		Sharon J. Drysdale Field; Evanston, IL	0–4	Mason (8–8)	**Hoehn** (5–4)	—	513	22–14	2–8
April 4	at Northwestern		Sharon J. Drysdale Field; Evanston, IL	9–5	**Ferguson** (3–1)	Blea (1–4)	**Hoehn** (1)	582	23–14	3–8
April 5	at Northwestern		Sharon J. Drysdale Field; Evanston, IL	11–9	**LaMarche** (3–2)	Dohse (2–3)	—	381	24–14	4–8
April 10	Ohio State		Alumni Field; Ann Arbor, MI	10–8	**LaMarche** (4–2)	Boutte (2–5)	—	1,215	25–14	5–8
April 11	Ohio State		Alumni Field; Ann Arbor, MI	11–1 ^{(6)}	**Ellis** (9–4)	Molk (14–12)	—	2,255	26–14	6–8
April 12	Ohio State		Alumni Field; Ann Arbor, MI	2–13 ^{(5)}	Boutte (3–5)	**LaMarche** (4–3)	—	2,049	26–15	6–9
April 14	at Central Michigan		Margo Jonker Stadium; Mount Pleasant, MI	8–1	**Meyers** (6–3)	Langan (7–9)	—	422	27–15	—
April 15	Bowling Green		Alumni Field	Cancelled						
April 17	at Wisconsin		Goodman Softball Complex; Madison, WI	7–4	**Ellis** (10–4)	Jacobson (10–7)	—	—	28–15	7–9
April 18	at Ohio State		Goodman Softball Complex; Madison, WI	3–6	Herr (10–5)	**Meyers** (6–4)	Lewis (2)	340	28–16	7–10
April 19	at Ohio State		Goodman Softball Complex; Madison, WI	12–14	Felci (1–0)	**Ellis** (10–5)	—	481	28–17	7–11
April 21	Toledo		Alumni Field; Ann Arbor, MI	3–0	**Hoehn** (6–4)	Johnson (1–8)	—	782	29–17	—
April 24	Indiana		Alumni Field; Ann Arbor, MI	4–8	Hess (8–2)	**Hoehn** (6–5)	—	1,350	29–18	8–11
April 25	Indiana		Alumni Field; Ann Arbor, MI	9–8	**Hoehn** (7–5)	Mannon (6–3)	—	1,855	30–18	8–12
April 26	Indiana		Alumni Field; Ann Arbor, MI	2–11 ^{(5)}	Hess (9–2)	**Ellis** (10–6)	—	1,847	30–19	8–13

May (3–0)
Date	Opponent	Rank	Stadium Site	Score	Win	Loss	Save	Attendance	Overall Record	B1G Record
May 1	at Michigan State		Secchia Stadium; East Lansing, MI	6–1	**Hoehn** (4–4)	Carsyn (5–10)	—	1,213	31–19	9–13
May 2	at Michigan State		Secchia Stadium; East Lansing, MI	9–1 ^{(6)}	**Ellis** (11–6)	Schuler (5–15)	—	1,436	32–19	10–13
May 3	at Michigan State		Secchia Stadium; East Lansing, MI	3–1	**Ellis** (12–6)	Carsyn (5–11)	—	1,452	33–19	11–13

Postseason (3–3)

Big Ten Tournament (1–1)
Date	Opponent	Rank	Site/Stadium	Score	Win	Loss	Save	Attendance	Overall Record	B1GT Record
May 6	Ohio State		Maryland Softball Stadium; College Park, MD	9–0 ^{(5)}	**Ellis** (13–6)	Boutte (7–7)	—	—	34–19	1–0
May 7	No. 2 Nebraska		Maryland Softball Stadium; College Park, MD	2–4	Frahm (17–4)	**Ellis** (13–7)	—	—	34–20	1–1

Norman Regional (2–2)
Date	Opponent	Rank	Site/stadium	Score	Win	Loss	Save	Attendance	Overall record	Regional record
May 15	vs. Kansas		Love's Field; Norman, OK	0–1 ^{(8)}	Partridge (10–4)	**Ellis** (13–8)	—	4,036	34–21	0–1
May 16	vs. Binghamton		Love's Field; Norman, OK	6–0	**Ellis** (14–8)	Glover (4–7)	—	4,235	35–21	1–1
May 16	vs. Kansas		Love's Field; Norman, OK	12–10	**Ellis** (15–8)	Barber (9–9)	—	4,235	36–21	2–1
May 17	vs. No. 2 Oklahoma		Love's Field; Norman, OK	1–8	Lowry (22–3)	**Ellis** (15–9)	—	3,947	36–22	2–2

- Win
- Loss
- Postponement
- Bold: Wolverines team member
- Rankings from NFCA.
- (#) Tournament seedings in parentheses.

== Rankings ==
Ranking movements Legend: — = Not ranked
	Week																
Poll	Pre	1	2	3	4	5	6	7	8	9	10	11	12	13	14	15	Final
NFCA / USA Today	—	—	—	—	—	—	—	—	—	—	—	—	—	—			
Softball America	—	—	—	—	—	—	—	—	—	—	—	—	—	—			
ESPN.com/USA Softball	—	—	—	—	—	—	—	—	—	—	—	—	—	—			
D1Softball	—	—	—	—	—	—	—	—	—	—	—	—	—	—			
