= 2026 Nebraska Cornhuskers softball team =

American college softball season

2026 Nebraska Cornhuskers softball

Big Ten Conference regular season champion Big Ten tournament champion NCAA Lincoln Regional champion NCAA Lincoln Super Regional champion
- Conference: Big Ten Conference
- Record: 52–8 (23–1 Big Ten)
- Head coach: Rhonda Revelle (34th season)
- Assistant coaches: Lori Sippel; Diane Miller; Olivia Ferrell
- Home stadium: Bowlin Stadium

2026 Big Ten Conference softball standings
	Conf.				Overall
Team	W		L	PCT	W		L	PCT
No. 1 Nebraska ‍†‍‡‍^{y}	23	–	1	.958	52	–	8	.867
No. 12 Oregon ‍‍‍^{y}	20	–	4	.833	41	–	14	.745
No. 5 UCLA ‍‍‍^{y}	20	–	4	.833	53	–	10	.841
Indiana ‍‍‍^{y}	17	–	7	.708	43	–	16	.729
Northwestern ‍‍‍	16	–	8	.667	29	–	21	.580
Washington ‍‍‍^{y}	16	–	8	.667	37	–	20	.649
Wisconsin ‍‍‍^{y}	14	–	10	.583	33	–	21	.611
Ohio State ‍‍‍	13	–	11	.542	26	–	27	.491
Michigan ‍‍‍^{y}	11	–	13	.458	36	–	22	.621
Penn State ‍‍‍	11	–	13	.458	33	–	21	.611
Purdue ‍‍‍	11	–	13	.458	34	–	20	.630
Iowa ‍‍‍	7	–	17	.292	27	–	27	.500
Minnesota ‍‍‍	7	–	17	.292	16	–	36	.308
Rutgers ‍‍‍	6	–	18	.250	27	–	27	.500
Maryland ‍‍‍	5	–	19	.208	19	–	29	.396
Michigan State ‍‍‍	3	–	20	.130	17	–	34	.333
Illinois ‍‍‍	3	–	20	.130	15	–	39	.278
† – Conference champion ‡ – Tournament champion y – Invited to the NCAA Tournament; As of May 31, 2026; Rankings from NFCA/USA Today

The 2026 Nebraska Cornhuskers softball team was an American college softball team that represented the University of Nebraska–Lincoln during the 2026 NCAA Division I softball season. The Cornhuskers were led by head coach Rhonda Revelle in her 34th season, and played their home games at Bowlin Stadium in Lincoln, Nebraska.

The Cornhuskers finished the regular season with a 43–6 record, setting a program record .878 regular season win percentage. They also posted a 23–1 record in conference play, to win their first outright Big Ten regular season title. Their 23 conference wins tied the Big Ten record for wins in a season. They then won the 2026 Big Ten softball tournament for the second time in program history. They advanced to the Women's College World Series for the first time since 2013 and ended the season with a 52–8 record, tying the program record for wins.

== Previous season ==
The Cornhuskers finished the 2025 season 43–15 overall, and 17–5 in the Big Ten. They received an at-large bid to the 2025 NCAA Division I softball tournament and advanced to the Super Regionals for the first time since 2014, before being eliminated by Tennessee.

== Roster and personnel ==
2026 Nebraksa Cornhuskers roster
Pitchers: 9 – Hannah Camenzind – Senior; 31 – Kylee Magee – Junior; 33 – Emmerson Cope – Junior; 98 – Jordy Frahm – Senior; 99 – Alexis Jensen – Freshman; Catchers: 1 – Olivia DiNardo – Senior; 25 – Jesse Farrell – Junior; 72 – Carlie Muhlbach – (redshirt) Freshman; Outfielders: 4 – Malia Thoms – Junior; 11 – Talia Tokheim – Senior; 14 – Kacie Hoffmann – Senior; 18 – Nessa McMillen – Sophomore; 23 – Hannah Coor – Senior; 26 – Alina Felix – Senior; 55 – Dakota Carter – Senior	Infielders: 2 – Lauren Camenzind – Senior; 3 – Bella Bacon – Senior; 7 – Ava Kuszak – Senior; 27 – Natalia Hill – Sophomore; 29 – Samantha Bland – Junior; 66 – Katelyn Caneda – Senior; Utility: 0 – Skarlett Jones – Freshman; 15 – Kennadi Williams – Sophomore

2026 Nebraska Cornhuskers coaching staff
- Rhonda Revelle – Head coach
- Lori Sippel – Associate head coach
- Diane Miller – Assistant coach
- Olivia Ferrell - Assistant Coach

== Schedule and results ==
2026 Nebraska Cornhuskers Softball Game Log
Regular season (43–6)

February (14–5)
Date	Opponent	Rank	Site	Score	Win	Loss	Save	Attendance	Overall Record	B1G Record
February 6	vs. Washington; UTSA Invitational	No. 10	Roadrunner Stadium; San Antonio, TX	8–5	**Jensen** (1–0)	Reimer (0–1)	**Frahm** (1)	1,023	1–0	—
February 6	vs. No. 1 Texas; UTSA Invitational	No. 10	Roadrunner Stadium	10–15	Gutierrez (1–0)	**Frahm** (0–1)	Wells (1)	1,023	1–1	—
February 7	vs. No. Texas; UTSA Invitational	No. 10	Roadrunner Stadium	8–5	**Frahm** (1–1)	Wells (0–1)	—	1,023	2–1	—
February 7	at UTSA; UTSA Invitational	No. 10	Roadrunner Stadium	6–3	**Camenzind** (1–0)	Stoudt (0–1)	—	766	3–1	—
February 8	vs. Washington; UTSA Invitational	No. 10	Roadrunner Stadium	2–3	Reimer (1–1)	**Frahm** (1–2)	—	766	3–2	—
February 12	vs. No. 12 LSU; Clearwater Invitational	No. 11	Eddie Moore Complex; Clearwater, FL	6–0	**Jensen** (2–0)	Heavener (2–1)	**Frahm** (2)	2,141	4–2	—
February 12	vs. No. 20 Georgia; Clearwater Invitational	No. 11	Eddie Moore Complex	5–6	Fisher (3–0)	**Jensen** (2–1)	Little (1)	2,141	4–3	—
February 13	vs. No. 3 Tennessee; Clearwater Invitational	No. 11	Eddie Moore Complex	1–4	Nuwer (3–0)	**Frahm** (1–3)	Pickens (1)	—	4–4	—
February 14	vs. UCF; Clearwater Invitational	No. 11	Eddie Moore Complex	6–0	**Frahm** (2–3)	Vokoun (1–1)	—	—	5–4	—
February 15	vs. Texas Tech; Clearwater Invitational	No. 11	Eddie Moore Complex	3–2	**Jensen** (3–1)	Canady (4–1)	**Frahm** (3)	4,908	6–4	—
February 20	vs. No. 22 South Carolina; Mary Nutter Classic	No. 10	Field of Dreams Complex; Cathedral City, CA	9–1 ^{(5)}	**Jensen** (4–1)	Lamb (0–1)	**Frahm** (4)	—	7–4	—
February 20	vs. Hawaii; Mary Nutter Classic	No. 10	Field of Dreams Complex	13–0 ^{(5)}	**Camenzind** (2–0)	Fidge (1–1)	—	—	8–4	—
February 21	vs. No. 11 Texas A&M; Mary Nutter Classic	No. 10	Field of Dreams Complex	8–2	**Frahm** (3–3)	Peters (3–1)	—	—	9–4	—
February 22	vs. Seattle; Mary Nutter Classic	No. 10	Field of Dreams Complex	9–0 ^{(6)}	**Camenzind** (3–0)	Vance (3–3)	—	—	10–4	—
February 22	vs. California; Mary Nutter Classic	No. 10	Field of Dreams Complex	6–0	**Jensen** (5–1)	Waiters (0–3)	**Frahm** (5)	—	11–4	—
February 26	at No. 21 Oklahoma State	No. 9	Cowgirl Stadium; Stillwater, OK	1–2 ^{(11)}	Crandall (5–0)	**Jensen** (5–2)	—	1,802	11–5	—
February 27	vs. South Dakota State	No. 9	Collins Family Softball Complex; Tulsa, OK	8–1	**Camenzind** (4–0)	Herman (3–1)	Magee (1)	675	12–5	—
February 27	at Tulsa	No. 9	Collins Family Softball Complex	9–1 ^{(6)}	**Jensen** (6–2)	Moore (3–4)	—	773	13–5	—
February 28	at No. 21 Oklahoma State	No. 9	Cowgirl Stadium	4–3	**Frahm** (4–3)	**Meylan** (4–4)	—	2,049	14–5	—

March (13–1)
Date	Opponent	Rank	Site	Score	Win	Loss	Save	Attendance	Overall Record	B1G Record
March 1	at No. 21 Oklahoma State	No. 9	Cowgirl Stadium	Cancelled						
March 5	vs. South Dakota State; Big Red Spring Classic	No. 10	Bowlin Stadium; Lincoln, NE	9–4	**Jensen** (7–2)	Vacanti (1–4)	—	2,022	15–5	—
March 5	vs. South Dakota State; Big Red Spring Classic	No. 10	Bowlin Stadium	8–0 ^{(5)}	**Frahm** (5–3)	Mangulis (4–4)	—	2,022	16–5	—
March 7	vs. Omaha; Big Red Spring Classic	No. 10	Bowlin Stadium	4–1	**Frahm** (6–3)	Groff (4–3)	—	2,245	17–5	—
March 8	vs. Omaha; Big Red Spring Classic	No. 10	Bowlin Stadium	10–2 ^{(6)}	**Jensen** (8–2)	Hornbuckle (3–2)	—	2,652	18–5	—
March 13	Michigan	No. 10	Bowlin Stadium; Lincoln, NE	2–5	**Jensen** (9–2)	Meyers (5–3)	**Frahm** (6)	1,993	19–5	1–0
March 14	Michigan	No. 10	Bowlin Stadium	8–4	**Frahm** (7–3)	Hoehn (3–3)	—	—	20–5	2–0
March 14	Michigan	No. 10	Bowlin Stadium	5–2	**Jensen** (10–2)	Ellis (8–2)	—	2,637	21–5	3–0
March 20	at Michigan State	No. 9	Secchia Stadium; East Lansing, MI	2–0	**Frahm** (8–3)	Schuler (4–5)	—	1,093	22–5	4–0
March 21	at Michigan State	No. 9	Secchia Stadium	13–0 ^{(6)}	**Jensen** (11–2)	Starr (1–2)	—	379	23–5	5–0
March 21	at Michigan State	No. 9	Secchia Stadium	4–1	**Magee** (1–0)	Schuler (4–6)	**Frahm** (7)	483	24–5	6–0
March 27	No. 7 UCLA	No. 9	Bowlin Stadium	4–1	**Jensen** (12–2)	Tinsley (15–3)	**Frahm** (8)	2,314	25–5	7–0
March 28	No. 7 UCLA	No. 9	Bowlin Stadium	5–6	Tinsley (16–3)	**Frahm** (8–4)	—	3,123	25–6	7–1
March 29	No. 7 UCLA	No. 9	Bowlin Stadium	8–4	**Jensen** (13–2)	Nally (2–1)	—	2,946	26–6	8–1
March 31	at Creighton	No. 8	Creighton Softball Stadium; Omaha, NE	8–0 ^{(5)}	**Jensen** (14–2)	Gilman (8–8)	—	604	27–6	—

April (13–0)
Date	Opponent	Rank	Site	Score	Win	Loss	Save	Attendance	Overall Record	B1G Record
April 4	Rutgers	No. 8	Bowlin Stadium	8–0 ^{(5)}	**Frahm** (9–4)	Shifflett (6–6)	—	2,381	28–6	9–1
April 4	Rutgers	No. 8	Bowlin Stadium	5–3	**Jensen** (15–2)	Hoekstra (5–5)	**Frahm** (9)	2,381	29–6	10–1
April 5	Rutgers	No. 8	Bowlin Stadium	11–5	**Frahm** (10–4)	Gewecke (5–10)	—	2,082	30–6	11–1
April 10	at Wisconsin	No. 7	Goodman Softball Complex; Madison, WI	5–0	**Jensen** (16–2)	Jacobson (10–5)	—	466	31–6	12–1
April 11	at Wisconsin	No. 7	Goodman Softball Complex	6–0	**Frahm** (11–4)	Lewis (3–4)	—	1,066	32–6	13–1
April 12	at Wisconsin	No. 7	Goodman Softball Complex	12–2 ^{(5)}	**Jensen** (17–2)	Jacobson (10–6)	—	877	33–6	14–1
April 17	at Minnesota	No. 6	Jane Sage Cowles Stadium; Minneapolis, MN	4–0	**Frahm** (12–4)	Schwartz (10–12)	—	689	34–6	15–1
April 18	at Minnesota	No. 6	Jane Sage Cowles Stadium	17–2 ^{(5)}	**Jensen** (18–2)	Richardson (3–10)	—	1,002	35–6	16–1
April 19	at Minnesota	No. 6	Jane Sage Cowles Stadium	11–2 ^{(6)}	**Frahm** (13–4)	Schwartz (10–13)	—	1,036	36–6	17–1
April 21	at Omaha	No. 4	Connie Claussen Field; Omaha, NE	11–4	**Camenzind** (5–0)	Wiggins (12–2)	—	2,320	37–6	—
April 24	Iowa	No. 4	Bowlin Stadium	9–1 ^{(6)}	**Frahm** (14–4)	Conlon (4–5)	—	3,396	38–6	18–1
April 24	Iowa	No. 4	Bowlin Stadium	5–2	**Jensen** (19–2)	Neiss (11–8)	—	3,396	39–6	19–1
April 25	Iowa	No. 4	Bowlin Stadium	13–0 ^{(5)}	**Frahm** (15–4)	Sapp (6–6)	—	3,541	40–6	20–1

May (3–0)
Date	Opponent	Rank	Site	Score	Win	Loss	Save	Attendance	Overall Record	B1G Record
May 1	at Penn State	No. 3	Beard Field; University Park, PA	5–1	**Frahm** (16–4)	Britton (5–6)	—	846	41–6	21–1
May 2	at Penn State	No. 3	Beard Field	10–4	**Jensen** (20–2)	Nemeth (4–6)	**Frahm** (10)	1,275	42–6	22–1
May 3	at Penn State	No. 3	Beard Field	13–5	**Jensen** (21–2)	Kellepouris (4–3)	—	1,001	43–6	23–1

Postseason (9–2)

Big Ten Tournament (3–0)
Date	Opponent	Rank	Site	Score	Win	Loss	Save	Attendance	Overall Record	B1GT Record
May 7	Michigan	No. 2	Maryland Softball Stadium; College Park, MD	4–2	**Frahm** (17–4)	Ellis (12–7)	—	—	44–6	1–0
May 8	Indiana	No. 2	Maryland Softball Stadium	5–0	**Jensen** (22–2)	Hess (10–)	—	—	45–6	2–0
May 9	No. 6 UCLA	No. 2	Maryland Softball Stadium	7–2	**Frahm** (18–4)	Tinsley (28–6)	—	—	46–6	3–0

Lincoln Regional (3–0)
Date	Opponent	Rank	Site	Score	Win	Loss	Save	Attendance	Overall Record	Regional Record
May 15	vs. South Dakota	No. 1	Bowlin Stadium	4–1	**Jensen** (23–2)	Evans (15–15)	**Frahm** (11)	2,948	47–6	1–0
May 16	vs. No. 21 Grand Canyon	No. 1	Bowlin Stadium	2–0	**Frahm** (19–4)	Batterton (10–2)	—	—	48–6	2–0
May 17	vs. No. 21 Grand Canyon	No. 1	Bowlin Stadium	1–0	**Jensen** (24–2)	Vickers (16–5)	**Frahm** (12)	3,200	49–6	3–0

Lincoln Super Regional (2–0)
Date	Opponent	Rank	Site	Score	Win	Loss	Save	Attendance	Overall Record	Super Reg. record
May 22	vs. No. 15 Oklahoma State	No. 1	Bowlin Stadium	8–1	**Frahm** (20–4)	Meylan (29–8)	—	3,279	50–6	1–0
May 23	vs. No. 15 Oklahoma State	No. 1	Bowlin Stadium	9–1 ^{(5)}	**Jensen** (25–2)	Meylan (29–9)	—	3,451	51–6	2–0

Women's College World Series (1–2)
Date	Opponent	Rank	Site	Score	Win	Loss	Save	Attendance	Overall Record	WCWS record
May 28	vs. No. 10 Arkansas	No. 1	Devon Park; Oklahoma City, OK	5–3 ^{(10)}	**Frahm** (21–4)	Herron (16–7)	—	12,605	52–6	1–0
May 30	vs. No. 3 Alabama	No. 1	Devon Park	1–5	Briski (25–3)	**Frahm** (21–5)	—	12,679	52–7	1–1
May 31	vs. No. 6 Texas	No. 1	Devon Park	1–3	Kavan (27–6)	**Frahm** (21–6)	—	12,390	52–8	1–2

- Win
- Loss
- Postponement
- Bold: Cornhuskers team member
- Rankings from NFCA.
- (#) Tournament seedings in parentheses.

== Rankings ==
Ranking movements Legend: ██ Increase in ranking ██ Decrease in ranking
	Week																
Poll	Pre	1	2	3	4	5	6	7	8	9	10	11	12	13	14	15	Final
NFCA / USA Today	10	11	10	9	10	10	9	9	8	7	6	4	3	2	1		
Softball America	11	13	10	8	9	9	8	8	5	5	3	1	2	2			
ESPN.com/USA Softball	9	8	6	4	5	5	5	6	4	5	4	3	2	2			
D1Softball	9	8	6	6	7	7	6	7	5	5	5	4	2	2			
