= 2026 Texas Longhorns softball team =

American college softball season

2026 Texas Longhorns softball

National Champions

NCAA Austin Super Regional champions NCAA Austin Regional champions SEC tournament champions
- Conference: Southeastern Conference

Ranking
- Coaches: No. 1
- Record: 53–12 (16–8 SEC)
- Head coach: Mike White (8th season)
- Assistant coaches: Ehren Earleywine (1st season); Kristen Zaleski (4th season); Patti Ruth Taylor (3rd season)
- Home stadium: Red and Charline McCombs Field

2026 Southeastern Conference softball standings
	Conf.				Overall
Team	W		L	PCT	W		L	PCT
No. 8 Oklahoma ‍†‍‍^{y}	20	–	4	.833	52	–	10	.839
No. 3 Alabama ‍‍‍^{y}	19	–	5	.792	56	–	9	.862
No. 9 Florida ‍‍‍^{y}	17	–	7	.708	52	–	12	.813
No. 1 Texas ‍‍‡‍^{y}	16	–	8	.667	53	–	12	.815
No. 4 Tennessee ‍‍‍^{y}	16	–	8	.667	49	–	12	.803
No. 20 Texas A&M ‍‍‍^{y}	16	–	8	.667	38	–	19	.667
No. 7 Arkansas ‍‍‍^{y}	15	–	9	.625	47	–	13	.783
No. 18 LSU ‍‍‍^{y}	13	–	11	.542	40	–	19	.678
No. 15 Georgia ‍‍‍^{y}	12	–	12	.500	41	–	20	.672
No. 10 Mississippi State ‍‍‍^{y}	9	–	15	.375	43	–	21	.672
Missouri ‍‍‍	9	–	15	.375	28	–	29	.491
South Carolina ‍‍‍^{y}	7	–	17	.292	32	–	28	.533
Ole Miss ‍‍‍^{y}	6	–	18	.250	36	–	26	.581
Auburn ‍‍‍	4	–	20	.167	27	–	28	.491
Kentucky ‍‍‍	1	–	23	.042	26	–	29	.473
† – Conference champion ‡ – Tournament champion y – Invited to the NCAA tournament As of June 4, 2026; Rankings from NFCA/USA Today

The 2026 Texas Longhorns softball team represented the University of Texas at Austin during the 2026 NCAA Division I softball season. The Longhorns played their home games at Red and Charline McCombs Field as a second-year member of the Southeastern Conference. They were led by head coach Mike White in his eighth season at Texas. The Longhorns entered the 2026 season as defending national champions, after winning the 2025 Women's College World Series for their first national championship in program history.

== Previous season ==
Texas finished the 2025 season 56–12, and 16–8 in SEC conference play. After sweeping the regional round at home, Texas won the Super Regional in three games over Clemson, clinching their eighth trip to the Women's College World Series. The Longhorns went undefeated in their first three games to reach their third trip the WCWS Finals. Texas split the first two games of the series against Texas Tech, and won the winner-take-all game 3 over the Red Raiders 10–4 to win the first National Championship in program history.

== Personnel ==
=== Roster ===
2026 Texas Longhorns Roster
Pitchers: 13 – Hannah Wells (Note: Plays two different positions) – freshman; 17 – Teagan Kavan – junior; 22 – Brenlee Gonzales – sophomore; 25 – Cambria Salmon – sophomore; 26 – Sophia Bordi – freshman; 77 – Citlaly Gutierrez – senior	Catchers: 14 – Reese Atwood – senior; 20 – Katie Stewart – junior; 42 – Anne Wallace – freshman; Infielders: 0 – Caigan Crabtree – freshman; 3 – MaTaia Lawson – freshman; 11 – Shylien Brister – sophomore; 12 – Victoria Hunter – junior; 20 – Katie Stewart – junior; 23 – Viviana Martinez – junior; 24 – Jaycie Nichols – freshman; 43 – Leighann Goode – senior	Outfielders: 4 – Adayah Wallace – junior; 7 – Ashton Maloney - senior; 9 – Alisa Sneed – freshman; 21 – Kayden Henry – junior; 44 – Kaiah Altmeyer – senior; Utility Players: 5 – Kaydee Bennett – senior; 13 – Hannah Wells – freshman; 27 – Taylor Anderson – sophomore; 42 – Anne Wallace – freshman; 99 – Drea Wilson – freshman

Roster Notes

=== Coaches ===
2026 Texas Longhorns coaching staff
- Mike White – Head coach – 8th year
- Ehren Earleywine – Associate head coach – 1st year
- Kristen Zaleski – Associate head coach – 4th year
- Patti Ruth Taylor – Assistant coach – 3rd year

=== Support staff ===
2026 Texas Longhorns support staff
- Keely McMillon – Director of operations (Softball) – 6th year
- Melissa Schmitz – Assistant director/Associate head coach for athletic performance – 10th year
- Raiza Aguilar – Associate athletic trainer (Softball)
- Nick Williams – Director of development and video analytics

== Offseason ==
=== Player departures ===
2026 Texas offseason departures
Name	Number	Pos.	Year	Hometown	Notes
Katie Cimusz	44	C/IF	Senior	Humble, TX	Graduated
Joley Mitchell	9	IF	Graduate Student	Rose Bud, AR	Graduated
Mac Morgan	55	P	Senior	Creighton, MO	Graduated
Mia Scott	10	UT	Senior	Angleton, TX	Graduated
Sophia Simpson	99	P	Senior	Mont Belvieu, TX	Graduated
Vanessa Quiroga	3	UT	Senior	Corpus Christi, TX	Graduated

Outgoing transfers

Name	B/T	Pos.	Hometown	Year	New school	Source
Rachel Wells	R/R	UT	Melissa, TX	Senior	Undecided	

=== Incoming players ===
2025 Texas Signing Class
Name	B/T	Number	Pos.	Hometown	High School	Source
Caigan Crabtree	R/R	0	IF	Melissa, TX	Melissa High School	
MaTaia Lawson	L/R	3	IF	Tinley Park, IL	Victor J. Andrew High School	
Jaycie Nichols	R/R	24	IF	Durant, OK	Caddo High School	
Alisa Sneed	R/R	9	OF	Conroe, TX	Conroe High School	
Anne Wallace	R/R	42	C/UT	Logan, UT	Ridgeline High School	
Hannah Wells	R/R	13	P/UT	Coahoma, TX	Coahoma High School	
Drea Wilson	R/R	99	UT	Forney, TX	North Forney High School	

Incoming transfers

Name	B/T	Number	Pos.	Hometown	Year	Previous school	Source
Taylor Anderson	L/R	27	UT	Dripping Springs, TX	Sophomore	Oklahoma State	
Kaiah Altmeyer	L/R	44	OF	San Diego, CA	Senior	Arizona	
Brenlee Gonzales	L/L	22	P	Aledo, TX	Sophomore	Texas Tech	
Sophia Bordi	R/R	26	P	Merchantville, NJ	Freshman	Oklahoma	

== Preseason ==
=== Preseason All-SEC team ===
Preseason All-SEC Team
Name	Number	Position	Class	Source
Reese Atwood	14	C	Senior	
Kayden Henry	21	OF	Junior	
Teagan Kavan	17	P	Junior	
Katie Stewart	20	IF/C	Junior	

=== SEC coaches poll ===
2026 SEC coaches poll
Predicted finish	Team	Votes (1st place)
1	Texas	189 (9)
2	Oklahoma	186 (6)
3	Tennessee	166
4	Florida	144
5	Arkansas	137
6	Texas A&M	125
7	LSU	119
8	Georgia	105
9	Alabama	94
10	South Carolina	90
11	Mississippi State	65
12	Auburn	55
13	Ole Miss	51
14	Missouri	32
15	Kentucky	17

== Schedule and results ==
2026 Texas Longhorns softball game log (53–12)
Legend: = Win = Loss = Tie = Canceled Bold = Texas team member
Regular season (39–10)

February (18–1)
Date	Time (CT)	TV	Opponent	Rank	Stadium	Score	Win	Loss	Save	Attendance	Overall record	SEC Record
UTSA Invitational
February 6	6:05 p.m.	ESPN+	vs. #9 Nebraska	#1	Roadrunner Field • San Antonio, TX	15–10	**Gutierrez** (1–0)	Frahm (0–1)	**Wells** (1)	1,023	1–0	—
February 7	1:05 p.m.	ESPN+	vs. #25 Washington	#1	Roadrunner Field • San Antonio, TX	11–6	**Kavan** (1–0)	Maddox (0–1)	—	1,023	2–0	—
February 7	3:35 p.m.	ESPN+	vs. #9 Nebraska	#1	Roadrunner Field • San Antonio, TX	5–8	Jensen (2–0)	**Wells** (0–1)	Frahm (2)	1,023	2–1	—
February 8	12:35 p.m.	ESPN+	vs. #25 Washington	#1	Roadrunner Field • San Antonio, TX	5–0 ^{(6)}	**Kavan** (2–0)	Rodriguez (0–1)	—	1,023	3–1	—
February 8	3:05 p.m.	ESPN+	at UTSA	#1	Roadrunner Field • San Antonio, TX	10–0 ^{(5)}	**Wells** (1–1)	Schmitt (0–1)	—	1,023	4–1	—
Bevo Classic
February 12	6:00 p.m.	SECN+	Abilene Christian	#2	Red and Charline McCombs Field • Austin, TX	11–0 ^{(5)}	**Wells** (2–1)	Meyer (0–3)	—	2,256	5–1	—
February 13	5:00 p.m.	SECN+	Ohio State	#2	Red and Charline McCombs Field • Austin, TX	14–6 ^{(5)}	**Gutierrez** (2–0)	Kay (1–2)	—	2,262	6–1	—
February 13	7:30 p.m.	SECN+	Syracuse	#2	Red and Charline McCombs Field • Austin, TX	14–0 ^{(5)}	**Salmon** (1–0)	Pengel (1–1)	—	2,262	7–1	—
February 14	5:00 p.m.	SECN+	Syracuse	#2	Red and Charline McCombs Field • Austin, TX	Cancelled due to inclement weather (Note: February 14th game against Syracuse cancelled due to inclement weather.)						
February 15 (Note: Game rescheduled from February 14th due to inclement weather.)	11:00 a.m.	SECN+	Ohio State	#2	Red and Charline McCombs Field • Austin, TX	7–4	**Salmon** (2–0)	Molk (2–2)	—	2,285	8–1	—
February 15	1:30 p.m.	SECN+	Northern Illinois	#2	Red and Charline McCombs Field • Austin, TX	9–1 ^{(6)}	**Kavan** (3–0)	Stewart (0–1)	—	2,285	9–1	—
DeMarini Invitational
February 20	2:00 p.m.	N/A	vs. #16 Arizona	#3	Stanford Softball Stadium • Palo Alto, CA	12–2	**Kavan** (4–0)	Adams (6–3)	—	1,000	10–1	—
February 20	4:30 p.m.	ACCNX	at #10 Stanford	#3	Stanford Softball Stadium • Palo Alto, CA	4–3	**Kavan** (5–0)	Krause (2–1)	—	2,000	11–1	—
February 21	2:00 p.m.	N/A	vs. Boise State	#3	Stanford Softball Stadium • Palo Alto, CA	10–0 ^{(5)}	**Gutierrez** (3–0)	Bauer (0–1)	—	N/A	12–1	—
February 21	6:30 p.m.	N/A	at Santa Clara	#3	Santa Clara Softball Stadium • Santa Clara, CA	10–2	**Gonzales** (1–0)	Ferguson (3–4)	—	N/A	13–1	—
February 22	11:30 a.m.	N/A	vs. #16 Arizona	#3	Stanford Softball Stadium • Palo Alto, CA	12–2 ^{(5)}	**Kavan** (6–0)	Holder (3–1)	—	500	14–1	—
February 25	6:00 p.m.	SECN+	Southeastern Louisiana	#3	Red and Charline McCombs Field • Austin, TX	7–2	**Kavan** (7–0)	Burns (4–1)	—	2,255	15–1	—
Longhorn Invitational
February 27	6:00 p.m.	SECN+	Houston	#3	Red and Charline McCombs Field • Austin, TX	9–1 ^{(5)}	**Gutierrez** (4–0)	Bodeux (2–2)	—	2,258	16–1	—
February 28	2:30 p.m.	SECN+	St. Bonaventure	#3	Red and Charline McCombs Field • Austin, TX	12–2 ^{(5)}	**Gonzales** (2–0)	Frani (0–8)	—	N/A	17–1	—
February 28	5:00 p.m.	SECN+	Prairie View A&M	#3	Red and Charline McCombs Field • Austin, TX	8–0 ^{(5)}	**Salmon** (3–0)	Adams (4–4)	—	N/A	18–1	—

March (13–1)
Date	Time (CT)	TV	Opponent	Rank	Stadium	Score	Win	Loss	Save	Attendance	Overall record	SEC Record
March 1	2:30 p.m.	SECN+	Incarnate Word	#3	Red and Charline McCombs Field • Austin, TX	8–0 ^{(6)}	**Kavan** (8–0)	Mitchell (3–3)	—	2,357	19–1	—
March 6	5:00 p.m.	SECN+	at #23 South Carolina	#3	Carolina Softball Stadium • Columbia, SC	4–2	**Kavan** (9–0)	Lamb (2–3)	—	1,125	20–1	1–0
March 7	2:00 p.m.	SECN+	at #23 South Carolina	#3	Carolina Softball Stadium • Columbia, SC	3–0	**Gutierrez** (4–1)	Heard (3–2)	**Kavan** (1)	1,564	21–1	2–0
March 8	11:00 a.m.	SECN	at #23 South Carolina	#3	Carolina Softball Stadium • Columbia, SC	5–2	**Wells** (3–1)	Friedel (5–3)	**Salmon** (1)	1,269	22–1	3–0
March 11	6:00 p.m.	SECN+	East Texas A&M	#3	Red and Charline McCombs Field • Austin, TX	10–1 ^{(5)}	**Salmon** (4–0)	Muller (1–8)	—	2,085	23–1	—
March 13	5:30 p.m.	SECN+	Ole Miss	#3	Red and Charline McCombs Field • Austin, TX	3–1	**Kavan** (10–0)	Aycock (8–3)	—	2,032	24–1	4–0
March 14	12:00 p.m.	SECN+	Ole Miss	#3	Red and Charline McCombs Field • Austin, TX	11–2 ^{(6)}	**Salmon** (5–0)	Boyer (5–6)	—	2,341	25–1	5–0
March 15	12:00 p.m.	SECN+	Ole Miss	#3	Red and Charline McCombs Field • Austin, TX	15–3 ^{(5)}	**Kavan** (11–0)	Aycock (8–4)	—	2,305	26–1	6–0
March 20	6:30 p.m.	SECN+	Baylor	#2	Red and Charline McCombs Field • Austin, TX	10–2 ^{(5)}	**Wells** (4–1)	Creager (7–4)	—	2,054	27–1	—
March 21	6:30 p.m.	ESPN+	at Baylor	#2	Getterman Stadium • Waco, TX	11–0 ^{(5)}	**Kavan** (12–0)	Tanner (6–3)	—	1,388	28–1	—
March 25	6:00 p.m.	ESPN+	at Texas State	#1	Bobcat Softball Stadium • San Marcos, TX	3–2	**Kavan** (13–0)	Azua (13–9)	—	1,177	29–1	—
March 27	6:00 p.m.	SECN+	#16 Texas A&M; Lone Star Showdown	#1	Red and Charline McCombs Field • Austin, TX	9–8	**Kavan** (14–0)	Peters (9–4)	—	2,138	30–1	7–0
March 28	1:00 p.m.	ESPN2	#16 Texas A&M; Lone Star Showdown	#1	Red and Charline McCombs Field • Austin, TX	3–2	**Wells** (5–1)	Lessentine (9–3)	**Kavan** (2)	2,148	31–1	8–0
March 29	1:00 p.m.	ESPN	#16 Texas A&M; Lone Star Showdown	#1	Red and Charline McCombs Field • Austin, TX	7–9	Munnerlyn (3–3)	**Kavan** (14–1)	—	2,135	31–2	8–1

April (7–7)
Date	Time (CT)	TV	Opponent	Rank	Stadium	Score	Win	Loss	Save	Attendance	Overall record	SEC Record
April 2	6:00 p.m.	SECN+	at #4 Alabama	#1	Rhoads Stadium • Tuscaloosa, AL	9–1	**Kavan** (15–1)	Briski (13–1)	—	3,592	32–2	9–1
April 3	7:30 p.m.	SECN	at #4 Alabama	#1	Rhoads Stadium • Tuscaloosa, AL	4–11	Briski (14–1)	**Wells** (5–2)	—	3,700	32–3	9–2
April 4	5:00 p.m.	ESPN	at #4 Alabama	#1	Rhoads Stadium • Tuscaloosa, AL	4–7	Moten (14–2)	**Kavan** (15–2)	Briski (1)	3,962	32–4	9–3
April 10	6:00 p.m.	ESPN2	#2 Oklahoma	#4	Red and Charline McCombs Field • Austin, TX	0–3	Lowry (18–1)	**Kavan** (15–3)	—	2,199	32–5	9–4
April 11	7:00 p.m.	ESPN	#2 Oklahoma	#4	Red and Charline McCombs Field • Austin, TX	3–4	Guachino (12–0)	**Gutierrez** (5–1)	Lowry (2)	2,209	32–6	9–5
April 12	1:00 p.m.	ESPN	#2 Oklahoma	#4	Red and Charline McCombs Field • Austin, TX	8–6 ^{(8)}	**Gutierrez** (6–1)	Lowry (18–2)	—	2,380	33–6	10–5
April 18	3:00 p.m.	SECN	at #15 Georgia	#5	Jack Turner Stadium • Athens, GA	7–5	**Gutierrez** (7–1)	Roelling (13–5)	**Kavan** (3)	2,289	34–6	11–5
April 19	11:00 a.m.	ESPN2	at #15 Georgia	#5	Jack Turner Stadium • Athens, GA	2–4	Fisher (10–4)	**Wells** (5–3)	—	2,663	34–7	11–6
April 20	6:00 p.m.	SECN	at #15 Georgia	#5	Jack Turner Stadium • Athens, GA	6–3 ^{(8)}	**Kavan** (16–3)	Roelling (13–6)	—	1,785	35–7	12–6
April 22	7:00 p.m.	ESPN2	#18 Oklahoma State	#7	Red and Charline McCombs Field • Austin, TX	0–5	Meylan (21–6)	**Gutierrez** (7–2)	—	1,955	35–8	—
April 24	5:00 p.m.	SECN	at Kentucky	#7	John Cropp Stadium • Lexington, KY	12–2 ^{(6)}	**Kavan** (17–3)	Hammond (3–7)	—	1,311	36–8	13–6
April 25	1:00 p.m.	SECN+	at Kentucky	#7	John Cropp Stadium • Lexington, KY	6—1	**Kavan** (18–3)	Haendiges (11–9)	—	1,691	37–8	14–6
April 26	12:00 p.m.	SECN+	at Kentucky	#7	John Cropp Stadium • Lexington, KY	11–2 ^{(6)}	**Kavan** (19–3)	Oslanzi (4–7)	—	1,911	38–8	15–6
April 30	7:00 p.m.	SECN	#10 Arkansas	#7	Red and Charline McCombs Field • Austin, TX	0–2	Herron (15–4)	**Kavan** (19–4)	—	2,375	38–9	15–7

May (1–1)
Date	Time (CT)	TV	Opponent	Rank	Stadium	Score	Win	Loss	Save	Attendance	Overall record	SEC Record
May 1	7:00 p.m. (Note: Start time moved from 2 p.m. to 7 p.m. due to forecasted inclement weather.)	SECN+	#10 Arkansas	#7	Red and Charline McCombs Field • Austin, TX	3–4	Timmerman (9–2)	**Gutierrez** (7–3)	—	2,037	38–10	15–8
May 2	12:00 p.m.	SECN+	#10 Arkansas	#7	Red and Charline McCombs Field • Austin, TX	4–1	**Kavan** (20–4)	Herron (15–5)	—	2,300	39–10	16–8

Postseason (14–2)

SEC Tournament (3–0)
Date	Time (CT)	TV	Opponent	Seed	Stadium	Score	Win	Loss	Save	Attendance	Overall record	Tournament record
May 7	4:00 p.m.	SECN	vs. (13) Ole Miss; Quarterfinals	#10 (4)	John Cropp Stadium • Lexington, KY	6–0	**Kavan** (21–4)	Boyer (12–13)	—	2,069	40–10	1–0
May 8	6:30 p.m.	ESPN	vs. #17 (9) Georgia; Semifinals	#10 (4)	John Cropp Stadium • Lexington, KY	5–4	**Gutierrez** (8–3)	Harrison (4–1)	—	2,328	41–10	2–0
May 9	4:00 p.m.	ESPN	vs. #4 (2) Alabama; Championship	#10 (4)	John Cropp Stadium • Lexington, KY	7–1	**Kavan** (22–4)	Briski (21–3)	—	2,353	42–10	3–0

NCAA Austin Regional (3–0)
Date	Time (CT)	TV	Opponent	Seed	Stadium	Score	Win	Loss	Save	Attendance	Overall record	Regional record
May 15	3:00 p.m.	ESPN+	(4) Wagner	#6 (1)	Red and Charline McCombs Field • Austin, TX	9–1 ^{(5)}	**Wells** (6–3)	Lotus (10–12)	—	2,072	43–10	1–0
May 16	12:00 p.m.	ESPN	(2) Wisconsin	#6 (1)	Red and Charline McCombs Field • Austin, TX	9–0 ^{(6)}	**Kavan** (23–4)	Jacobson (15–10)	—	1,546	44–10	2–0
May 17	12:00 p.m.	ESPN	(3) Baylor; Regional Final	#6 (1)	Red and Charline McCombs Field • Austin, TX	7–0	**Kavan** (24–4)	Tanner (9–12)	—	1,914	45–10	3–0

NCAA Austin Super Regional (2–1)
Date	Time (CT)	TV	Opponent	Seed	Stadium	Score	Win	Loss	Save	Attendance	Overall record	Super Regional record
May 22	8:00 p.m.	ESPN2	#19 Arizona State	#6 (2)	Red and Charline McCombs Field • Austin, TX	1–4	Brown (18–6)	**Kavan** (24–5)	—	2,085	45–11	0–1
May 23	7:00 p.m.	ESPN	#19 Arizona State	#6 (2)	Red and Charline McCombs Field • Austin, TX	4–3	**Gutierrez** (9–3)	Brown (18–7)	—	2,211	46–11	1–1
May 24	3:30 p.m.	ESPN	#19 Arizona State	#6 (2)	Red and Charline McCombs Field • Austin, TX	5–0	**Kavan** (25–5)	Brown (18–8)	—	2,472	47–11	2–1

Women's College World Series (6–1)
Date	Time (CT)	TV	Opponent	Seed	Stadium	Score	Win	Loss	Save	Attendance	Overall record	WCWS record
May 28	1:30 p.m.	ESPN	vs. #8 (7) Tennessee	#6 (2)	Devon Park • Oklahoma City, OK	3–6	Mardjetko (15–2)	**Kavan** (25–6)	Pickens (7)	11,923	47–12	0–1
May 29	6:00 p.m.	ESPN	vs. #20 Mississippi State	#6 (2)	Devon Park • Oklahoma City, OK	4–0	**Kavan** (26–6)	Everett (3–2)	—	12,546	48–12	1–1
May 31	2:00 p.m.	ABC	vs. #1 (4) Nebraska	#6 (2)	Devon Park • Oklahoma City, OK	3–1	**Kavan** (27–6)	Frahm (21–6)	—	12,390	49–12	2–1
June 1	11:00 a.m.	ESPN	vs. #8 (7) Tennessee	#6 (2)	Devon Park • Oklahoma City, OK	5–2	**Gutierrez** (10–3)	Mardjetko (16–3)	**Kavan** (4)	9,276	50–12	3–1
June 1	2:15 p.m.	ESPN	vs. #8 (7) Tennessee	#6 (2)	Devon Park • Oklahoma City, OK	4–0	**Kavan** (28–6)	Pickens (15–8)	—	9,276	51–12	4–1
June 3	7:00 p.m.	ESPN	vs. #4 (11) Texas Tech; Championship Series	#6 (2)	Devon Park • Oklahoma City, OK	7–3	**Kavan** (29–6)	Terry (24–3)	—	12,149	52–12	5–1
June 4	7:00 p.m.	ESPN	vs. #4 (11) Texas Tech; Championship Series	#6 (2)	Devon Park • Oklahoma City, OK	4–1	**Gutierrez** (11–3)	Canady (29–7)	**Kavan** (5)	12,308	53–12	6–1

Schedule Notes:

== Awards and honors ==
=== National awards and honors ===
National Yearly honors
Honors	Player	Position	Date Awarded	Ref.
Softball America All-America First Team	Katie Stewart	IF	May 19, 2026	
D1Softball All-America First Team	Katie Stewart	IF	May 26, 2026	
D1Softball All-America Second Team	Teagan Kavan	P	May 26, 2026	
D1Softball All-America Second Team	Kayden Henry	OF	May 26, 2026	
NFCA All-America Second Team	Reese Atwood	C	May 27, 2026	
NFCA All-America Second Team	Teagan Kavan	P	May 27, 2026	
NFCA All-America Second Team	Katie Stewart	IF	May 27, 2026	
Rawlings Gold Glove Award	Reese Atwood	C	May 27, 2026	
Rawlings Gold Glove Award	Ashton Maloney	OF	May 27, 2026	
D1Softball Freshman All-America First Team	Hannah Wells	P/UTL	May 28, 2026	

National Weekly honors
Honors	Player	Position	Date Awarded	Ref.
D1Softball National Player of the Week	Reese Atwood	C	February 10, 2026	
D1Softball National Pitcher of the Week	Teagan Kavan	P	February 24, 2026	
Softball America Defender of the Week	Reese Atwood	C	March 31, 2026	

=== SEC awards and honors ===
SEC Yearly honors
Honors	Player	Position	Date Awarded	Ref.
SEC Player of the Year	Katie Stewart	IF	May 8, 2026	
All-SEC First Team	Kayden Henry	OF	May 8, 2026	
All-SEC First Team	Teagan Kavan	P	May 8, 2026	
All-SEC First Team	Viviana Martinez	IF	May 8, 2026	
All-SEC First Team	Katie Stewart	IF	May 8, 2026	
All-SEC Second Team	Reese Atwood	C	May 8, 2026	
All-SEC Second Team	Leighann Goode	IF	May 8, 2026	
All-SEC Second Team	Hannah Wells	P/UTL	May 8, 2026	
SEC All-Defensive Team	Reese Atwood	C	May 8, 2026	

SEC Weekly honors
Honors	Player	Position	Date Awarded	Ref.
SEC Player of the Week	Reese Atwood	C	February 9, 2026	
SEC Pitcher of the Week	Teagan Kavan	P	March 10, 2026	
SEC Freshman of the Week	Hannah Wells	P/UTL	March 24, 2026	
SEC Player of the Week	Viviana Martinez	IF	April 21, 2026	

== Record vs. conference opponents ==
. Blank are not scheduled. Blue are home games, otherwise away.

2026 SEC softball records Source: 2026 SEC softball game results, 2026 SEC softball schedule
Tm	W–L	ALA	ARK	AUB	FLA	UGA	KEN	LSU	MSU	MIZ	OKL	OMS	SCA	TEN	TEX	TAM	Tm	SR	SW
ALA	19–5		2–1	3–0	.	.	3–0	.	.	2–1	.	3–0	3–0	1–2	2–1	.	ALA	7–1	4–0
ARK	15–9	1–2		3–0	2–1	2–1	.	.	2–1	2–1	1–2	.	.	.	2–1	.	ARK	6–2	1–0
AUB	4–20	0–3	0–3		1–2	.	2–1	0–3	.	0–3	0–3	1–2	.	.	.	.	AUB	1–7	0–5
FLA	17–7	.	1–2	2–1		1–2	3–0	.	2–1	3–0	.	.	3–0	2–1	.	.	FLA	6–2	3–0
UGA	12–12	.	1–2	.	2–1		3–0	.	2–1	2–1	0–3	.	.	.	1–2	1–2	UGA	4–4	1–1
KEN	1–23	0–3	.	1–2	0–3	0–3		.	.	.	0–3	.	.	0–3	0–3	0–3	KEN	0–8	0–7
LSU	13–11	.	.	3–0	.	.	.		1–2	2–1	1–2	3–0	2–1	0–3	.	1–2	LSU	4–4	2–1
MSU	9–15	.	1–2	.	1–2	1–2	.	2–1		.	.	1–2	2–1	1–2	.	0–3	MSU	2–6	0–1
MIZ	9–15	1–2	1–2	3–0	0–3	1–2	.	1–2	.		.	.	1–2	1–2	.	.	MIZ	1–7	1–1
OKL	20–4	.	2–1	3–0	.	3–0	3–0	2–1	.	.		3–0	.	.	2–1	2–1	OKL	8–0	4–0
OMS	6–18	0–3	.	2–1	.	.	.	0–3	2–1	.	0–3		.	2–1	0–3	0–3	OMS	3–5	0–5
SCA	7–17	0–3	.	.	0–3	.	.	1–2	1–2	2–1	.	.		1–2	0–3	2–1	SCA	2–6	0–3
TEN	16–8	2–1	.	.	1–2	.	3–0	3–0	2–1	2–1	.	1–2	2–1		.	.	TEN	6–2	2–0
TEX	16–8	1–2	1–2	.	.	2–1	3–0	.	.	.	1–2	3–0	3–0	.		2–1	TEX	6–2	3–0
TAM	16–8	.	.	.	.	2–1	3–0	2–1	3–0	.	1–2	3–0	1–2	.	1–2		TAM	5–3	3–0
Tm	W–L	ALA	ARK	AUB	FLA	UGA	KEN	LSU	MSU	MIZ	OKL	OMS	SCA	TEN	TEX	TAM	Team	SR	SW

Updated for entire regular season.
Tie breakers: TEX>TEN>TAM, SCA common. MSU>MIZ, FLA common.

== Rankings ==
Ranking movements Legend: ██ Increase in ranking ██ Decrease in ranking т = Tied with team above or below
	Week															
Poll	Pre	1	2	3	4	5	6	7	8	9	10	11	12	13	14	Final
NFCA / USA Today	1	2	3	3	3	3	2	1	1	4	5	7	7	10	6	1
Softball America	2	3	3	3	3	2	2	1	1	4	8	8	6	8	8	1
ESPN.com/USA Softball	1т	2	3	3	3	3	2	1	1	4	5	4	5	6	3	1
D1Softball	1	2	2	2	2	2	2	1	1	4	4	5	5	6	6	1
