= Katie Stewart (softball) =

American softball player

Texas Longhorns – No. 20
- Infielder

Teams
- Texas (2024–present)

Career highlights and awards
- 2× Women's College World Series champion (2025, 2026); 3× WCWS All-Tournament Team (2024, 2025, 2026); SEC Player of the Year (2026); Second team All-American (2026); All-SEC First Team (2026); All-SEC Second Team (2025); All-Big 12 Second Team (2024); All-Big 12 Freshman Team (2024)

Katie Stewart is an American college softball player for Texas.

== High school career ==
Stewart attended Lincoln-Way East High School in Frankfort, Illinois. During her junior year, she had a .500 batting average with 46 hits, nine doubles, two triples, 15 home runs and 41 runs batted in (RBI). She was ranked as the No. 9 player according to the Extra Inning Softball for the class of 2023. On November 9, 2022, she signed her National Letter of Intent to play at Texas.

== College career ==
Stewart began her collegiate career for Texas in 2024. During her freshman year she appeared in 62 games, with 60 starts, and batted .369, with 62 hits, 13 doubles, 13 home runs and 58 RBIs. Following the season she was named to the All-Big Freshman team and All-Big 12 second teem. Her 58 RBIs were the most by a freshman in program history. She helped Texas finish as runner-up during the 2024 Women's College World Series, and was subsequently named to the all-tournament team.

During her sophomore year in 2025, she started all 68 games, and batted .381 with 75 hits, 14 doubles, 17 home runs, and 80 RBIs. She also led the country with 83 RBIs during the regular season. She started all 24 conference games while posting a .352/.620/.418 slash line. She recorded 25 hits, 17 runs, five home runs, and 22 RBIs. She reached base in 12 straight games and had 23 multi-RBI games, including a team-high 10 games with at least three RBI. Following the season she was named to the All-SEC second team. She was second player in program history to surpass 70 RBIs in a season. During the finals of the 2025 Women's College World Series against Texas Tech she recorded three hits, two runs, and two RBI to help Texas win their first NCAA championship in program history. She was subsequently named to the Women's College World Series all-tournament team.

During her junior year in 2026, she batted .429 with 76 hits, nine doubles, 30 home runs, and 77 RBIs. Following the season she was named an All-SEC first team selection, and the SEC Player of the Year. She led the conference in batting average, ranked second in home runs, and fifth in RBIs. She became the first player in program history to earn the SEC Player of the Year award, and the fourth Longhorn to earn conference player of the year honors. On April 26, 2026, in a game against Kentucky, she recorded her 24th home run of the season, setting a new single-season program record, surpassing the previous of 23 set by Reese Atwood in 2025. On May 31, 2026, during the 2026 Women's College World Series against Nebraska, she hit a three-run home run in the sixth inning off Jordy Frahm to help Texas advance to the national semifinals. During the national semifinals against Tennessee she had a two home run game, helping Texas advance to the finals. On June 3, 2026, during game one of the finals against Texas Tech, she hit a home run in her fourth consecutive Women's College World Series game, becoming the first player in NCAA Division I history to accomplish this.
