= Transfer, Pennsylvania =

Unincorporated community in Pennsylvania, US

- Unincorporated community
- Location within Pennsylvania
- Coordinates: 41°19′44″N 80°25′58″W
- Country: United States
- State: Pennsylvania
- County: Mercer
- Elevation: 991 ft (302 m)
- Time zone: UTC-5 (Eastern (EST))
  - Summer (DST): UTC-4 (EDT)
- ZIP code: 16154
- Area codes: 724, 878
- GNIS feature ID: 1189717

Transfer is an unincorporated community in Mercer County, Pennsylvania, United States. The community is located along a rail line 6.6 miles (10.6 km) north of Hermitage. Transfer has a post office, with ZIP code 16154. Norfolk Southern Railway's Meadville Line passes through the community that is also bisected by Rutledge Road and Brush Run.
