= 2026 NCAA Division I softball rankings =

2026 NCAA Division I softball season
- Duration: Feb 5 - June 5, 2026
- Preseason No. 1: Texas (USA Today, ESPN & D1 Softball); Texas Tech (ESPN & Softball America)
- Defending Champions: Texas
- TV partner/s: ESPN

NCAA Tournament
- Duration: May 15 - June 5, 2026

Women's College World Series
- Duration: May 28 – June 5, 2026

Seasons
- ← 2025 2027 →

The following human polls make up the 2026 NCAA Division I women's softball rankings. The NFCA/USA Today Poll is voted on by a panel of 31 Division I softball coaches. The NFCA/USA Today poll, the Softball America poll, the ESPN.com/USA Softball Collegiate rankings, and D1Softball rank the top 25 teams nationally.

== Legend ==
	Increase in ranking
	Decrease in ranking
	Not ranked previous week
Italics	Number of first place votes
(#-#)	Win-loss record
т	Tied with team above or below also with this symbol

== NFCA/USA Today ==
	Preseason Jan 27	Week 1 Feb 10	Week 2 Feb 17	Week 3 Feb 23	Week 4 Mar 3	Week 5 Mar 10	Week 6 Mar 17	Week 7 Mar 24	Week 8 Mar 31	Week 9 Apr 7	Week 10 Apr 14	Week 11 Apr 21	Week 12 Apr 28	Week 13 May 5	Week 14 May 12	Final Jun 9	
1.	Texas (21)	Texas Tech (6–0) (25)	Tennessee (10–0) (19)	Tennessee (14–0) (28)	Tennessee (19–0) (30)	Tennessee (23–0) (30)	Tennessee (26–1) (23)	Texas (28–1) (30)	Texas (31–2) (20)	Texas Tech (38–2) (26)	Oklahoma (40–4) (12)	Oklahoma (42–6) (12)	Oklahoma (46–6) (25)	Oklahoma (48–7) (18)	Nebraska (46–6) (26)	Texas (53–12) (31)	1.
2.	Texas Tech (10)	Texas (4–1) (5)	Texas Tech (11–1) (10)	Texas Tech (16–1) (2)	Texas Tech (22–1) (1)	Texas Tech (25–1) (1)	Texas (26–1) (7)	Texas Tech (30–2)	Texas Tech (34–2) (11)	Oklahoma (38–3) (1)	Texas Tech (40–3) (12)	Texas Tech (42–4) (4)	Texas Tech (47–4) (4)	Nebraska (43–6) (11)	Oklahoma (48–8) (2)	Texas Tech (61–10)	2.
3.	Oklahoma	Tennessee (5–0) (1)	Texas (9–1) (2)	Texas (14–1)	Texas (19–1)	Texas (22–1)	Texas Tech (27–2)	Florida (31–2)	Oklahoma (34–3)	Alabama (35–3) (2)	Alabama (39–3) (7)	Alabama (42–4) (7)	Nebraska (40–6) (2)	Texas Tech (50–5) (1)	Alabama (49–7)	Alabama (56–9)	3.
4.	Tennessee	Florida (5–0)т	Florida (12–0)	Florida (19–0)	Alabama (20–0)	Alabama (23–0)	Alabama (26–1)	Tennessee (28–3) (1)	Alabama (33–2)	Texas (32–4) (2)	Florida (40–5)	Nebraska (36–6) (4)	Alabama (44–5)	Alabama (47–6) (1)	Texas Tech (52–6)	Tennessee (49–12)	4.
5.	Oregon	Oklahoma (3–1)т	Oklahoma (8–1)	Alabama (13–0)	Florida (23–1)	Florida (25–1)	Florida (29–1)	Oklahoma (31–2)	Florida (33–4)	Florida State (35–4)	Texas (33–6)	Florida (43–6) (2)	UCLA (44–5)	Tennessee (42–9)	UCLA (47–8)	Nebraska (52–8)	5.
6.	Florida	UCLA (5–0)	Florida State (8–2)	Oklahoma (13–2)	Oklahoma (19–2)	Oklahoma (24–2)	Oklahoma (28–2)	Alabama (29–2)	Florida State (32–4)	Florida (36–5)	Nebraska (33–6)	UCLA (41–5) (2)	Florida (45–7)	UCLA (45–7)	Texas (42–10)	UCLA (53–10)	6.
7.	UCLA	Florida State (5–0)	Arkansas (8–1)	Arkansas (13–1)	Arkansas (19–1)	UCLA (21–3)	UCLA (25–3)	UCLA (27–3)	Tennessee (30–5)	Nebraska (30–6)	Tennessee (36–6)	Texas (34–7)	Texas (38–8)	Florida (47–9)	Florida State (49–8)	Arkansas (47–13)	7.
8.	Florida State	Texas A&M (4–1)	Alabama (9–0)	UCLA (13–3)	UCLA (18–3)	Arkansas (21–2)	Florida State (25–4)	Florida State (28–4)	Nebraska (26–6)	Arkansas (32–5)	Arkansas (35–6)	Tennessee (37–7)	Tennessee (39–8)	Florida State (46–8)	Tennessee (42–10)	Oklahoma (52–10)	8.
9.	Arkansas	Arkansas (4–1)	UCLA (7–3)	Nebraska (11–4)	Florida State (17–4)	Florida State (21–4)	Nebraska (21–5)	Nebraska (24–5)	Arkansas (30–5)	Tennessee (32–6)	UCLA (37–5)	Arkansas (36–8)	Florida State (43–7)	Arkansas (41–10)	Florida (48–10)	Florida (52–12)	9.
10.	Nebraska	Alabama (5–0)	Nebraska (6–4)	Florida State (12–4)	Nebraska (14–5)	Nebraska (18–5)	Arkansas (23–4)	Arkansas (27–4)	UCLA (29–4)	UCLA (33–5)	Florida State (36–7)	Florida State (39–7)	Arkansas (39–9)	Texas (39–10)	Arkansas (42–11)	Mississippi State (43–21)	10.
11.	Texas A&M	Nebraska (3–2)	Texas A&M (7–3)	Virginia Tech (11–2)	Virginia Tech (16–2)	Virginia Tech (21–2)	Mississippi State (27–4)	Virginia Tech (28–4)	Virginia Tech (31–4)	Virginia Tech (33–5)	Virginia Tech (36–6)	Texas A&M (34–12)	Oregon (38–10)	Oregon (40–11)	Virginia Tech (46–10)	Florida State (52–10)	11.
12.	South Carolina	LSU (6–0)	Stanford (8–1)	Mississippi State (14–1)	Mississippi State (18–2)	Mississippi State (21–2)	Virginia Tech (23–4)	Mississippi State (29–6)	Virginia (31–3)	Arizona (29–8)	Texas A&M (30–12)	Oregon (35–9)	Duke (35–12)	Duke (38–13)	Oregon (40–12)	Duke (43–17)	12.
13.	Clemson	Stanford (5–0)	South Carolina (7–2)	Texas A&M (10–6)	Arizona (17–5)	Arizona (20–5)	Arizona (21–7)	Virginia (27–3)	Mississippi State (31–7)	Mississippi State (33–9)	Oregon (32–9)	Virginia Tech (38–8)	Virginia Tech (41–9)	Virginia Tech (44–9)	Duke (39–14)	Oklahoma State (41–17)	13.
14.	Ole Miss	Virginia Tech (5–0)	Mississippi State (10–0)	Arizona (12–5)	Texas A&M (15–7)	Virginia (22–2)	Virginia (25–3)	Arizona (23–8)	Arizona (27–8)	Texas A&M (26–12)	Mississippi State (34–11)	Duke (35–12)	Texas A&M (35–14)	Stanford (36–12)	Stanford (37–13)	Arizona State (45–18)	14.
15.	Alabama	Oregon (2–3)	Arizona (8–3)	Georgia (13–4)	Georgia (17–5)	Georgia (19–7)	Georgia (20–7)	Georgia (23–8)	Georgia (27–8)	Oregon (29–9)	Georgia (31–10)	Georgia (33–12)	Stanford (34–12)	Texas A&M (36–16)	Oklahoma State (38–15)	Georgia (41–20)	15.
16.	LSU	South Carolina (3–2)	Georgia (9–2)	Stanford (10–4)	Virginia (19–1)	Texas A&M (17–8)	Texas A&M (19–8)	Texas A&M (22–9)	Texas A&M (24–11)	Georgia (28–10)	Arizona (30–11)	Stanford (30–12)	Oklahoma State (34–12)	Oklahoma State (37–13)	Georgia (38–18)	Virginia Tech (48–12)	16.
17.	Arizona	Arizona (3–2)	Virginia Tech (7–2)	LSU (12–4)	LSU (17–4)	Grand Canyon (27–0)	Grand Canyon (30–0) (1)	Grand Canyon (33–1)	Grand Canyon (36–2)	Virginia (31–6)	Duke (31–12)	Mississippi State (34–14)	Georgia (34–16)	Georgia (36–17)	Texas A&M (36–17)	Oregon (41–14)	17.
18.	Stanford	Clemson (3–2)	Oregon (5–4)	Virginia (12–1)	Oregon (13–6)	Oregon (18–7)	Oregon (21–7)	Oregon (23–8)	Oregon (26–9)	Duke (28–11)	Virginia (33–8)	Oklahoma State (30–12)	Mississippi State (36–15)	LSU (37–16)	LSU (37–17)	LSU (40–19)	18.
19.	Virginia Tech	Mississippi State (4–0)	LSU (7–4)	South Carolina (9–5)	Oklahoma State (15–5)	Stanford (14–6)	Stanford (15–8)	Stanford (18–8)	Oklahoma State (25–10)	Oklahoma State (25–10)	Grand Canyon (41–4)	Arizona (31–13)	Arizona (34–13)	Mississippi State (37–17)	Arizona State (41–16)	Stanford (39–15)	19.
20.	Georgia	Georgia (4–1)	Duke (7–3)	Oregon (8–6)	Grand Canyon (22–0)	LSU (17–7)	Arizona State (22–7)	LSU (21–10)	Arizona State (28–9)	Grand Canyon (37–4)	Stanford (26–12)	LSU (32–14)	LSU (33–16)	Arizona (35–15)	Mississippi State (38–18)	Texas A&M (38–19)	20.
21.	Liberty	Ole Miss (3–2)	Virginia (7–1)	Oklahoma State (11–4)	Stanford (11–6)	Oklahoma State (17–7)	South Carolina (19–10)	Oklahoma State (21–10)	Washington (30–6)	LSU (25–13)	Oklahoma State (27–11)	Grand Canyon (43–6)	Grand Canyon (45–7)	Grand Canyon (48–7)	Grand Canyon (52–8)	UCF (41–19–1)	21.
22.	Mississippi State	Duke (4–1)	Arizona State (10–1)	Grand Canyon (16–0)	Arizona State (19–3)	UCF (22–5)	LSU (18–9)	Arizona State (23–9)	LSU (23–12)	Washington (31–9)	LSU (28–14)	UCF (35–12–1)	UCF (36–14–1)	UCF (38–15–1)	Arizona (35–16)	Arizona (37–18)	22.
23.	Duke	Florida Atlantic (5–0)	Clemson (6–4)	Duke (9–7)	South Carolina (15–6)	South Carolina (15–9)	Oklahoma State (18–9)	South Carolina (21–12)	Duke (24–11)	Arizona State (29–11)	Washington (34–9)	Virginia (33–11)	Virginia (36–12)	Virginia (37–12)	UCF (38–16–1)	Grand Canyon (54–10)	23.
24.	Oklahoma State	Virginia (4–1)	Oklahoma State (6–4)	Arizona State (13–3)	UCF (20–4)	Clemson (16–8)	UCF (23–7)	Duke (22–10)	Stanford (20–10)	Stanford (22–12)	UCF (32–11–1)	Arizona State (35–13)	Louisville (41–10)	Arizona State (38–16)	Virginia (38–13)	Virginia (40–15)	24.
25.	Ohio State	Southeastern Louisiana (4–2)	Ole Miss (6–4)	Clemson (10–5)	Clemson (13–7)	Arizona State (19–6)	Clemson (19–9)	Washington (26–6)	South Carolina (22–14)	UCF (30–10–1)	Arizona State (31–13)	Washington (34–12)	Arizona State (35–16)	Louisville (43–11)	Louisville (44–12)	Louisville (44–14)	25.
	Preseason Jan 27	Week 1 Feb 10	Week 2 Feb 17	Week 3 Feb 23	Week 4 Mar 3	Week 5 Mar 10	Week 6 Mar 17	Week 7 Mar 24	Week 8 Mar 31	Week 9 Apr 7	Week 10 Apr 14	Week 11 Apr 21	Week 12 Apr 28	Week 13 May 5	Week 14 May 12	Final Jun 9	
		Dropped: No. 21 Liberty; No. 24 Oklahoma State; No. 25 Ohio State	Dropped: No. 23 Florida Atlantic; No. 25 Southeastern Louisiana	Dropped: No. 25 Ole Miss	Dropped: No. 23 Duke	None	None	Dropped: No. 24 UCF; No. 25 Clemson	None	Dropped: No. 25 South Carolina	None	None	Dropped: No. 25 Washington	None	None	None	

== ESPN.com/USA Softball Collegiate Top 25 ==
	Preseason Jan 20	Week 1 Feb 10	Week 2 Feb 17	Week 3 Feb 24	Week 4 Mar 3	Week 5 Mar 10	Week 6 Mar 17	Week 7 Mar 24	Week 8 Mar 31	Week 9 Apr 7	Week 10 Apr 14	Week 11 Apr 21	Week 12 Apr 28	Week 13 May 5	Week 14 May 12	Final Jun 9	
1.	Texasт (14)	Texas Tech (6–0) (18)	Tennessee (10–0) (21)	Tennessee (14–0) (23)	Tennessee (19–0) (24)	Tennessee (23–0) (24)	Tennessee (27–1) (18)	Texas (28–1) (23)	Texas (31–2) (19)	Texas Tech (38–2) (17)	Oklahoma (40–4) (20)	Oklahoma (42–6) (13)	Oklahoma (46–6) (23)	Oklahoma (48–7) (18)	Nebraska (46–6) (13)	Texas (53–12) (25)	1.
2.	Texas Techт (11)	Texas (4–1) (6)	Texas Tech (11–1) (2)	Texas Tech (16–1)	Texas Tech (22–1)	Texas Tech (25–1)	Texas (26–1) (7)	Texas Tech (30–2) (2)	Texas Tech (34–2) (5)	Oklahoma (38–3) (2)	Alabama (39–3) (5)	Alabama (42–4) (5)	Nebraska (40–6) (1)	Nebraska (43–6) (6)	Alabama (49–7) (6)	Texas Tech (61–10)	2.
3.	Oklahoma	Tennessee (5–0) (1)	Texas (9–1) (2)	Texas (14–1) (2)	Texas (19–1) (1)	Texas (22–1) (1)	Texas Tech (27–2)	Oklahoma (31–2)	Oklahoma (31–2)	Alabama (35–3) (6)	Texas Tech (39–3)	Nebraska (36–6) (5)	Alabama (44–5) (1)	Alabama (47–6) (1)	Texas (42–10) (3)	Alabama (56–9)	3.
4.	Tennessee	Oklahoma (3–1)	Oklahoma (8–1)	Nebraska (11–4)	Oklahoma (19–2)	Oklahoma (24–2)	Oklahoma (28–2)	Tennessee (28–3)	Nebraska (26–6)	Texas (32–4)	Nebraska (33–6)	Texas (34–7) (2)	Texas Tech (47–4)	Texas Tech (50–5)	Oklahoma (48–8) (3)	Tennessee (49–12)	4.
5.	Oregon	Florida (5–0)	Florida (12–0)	Oklahoma (13–2)	Nebraska (14–5)	Nebraska (18–5)	Nebraska (21–5)	Florida (31–2)	Alabama (33–2) (1)	Nebraska (30–6)	Texas (33–6)	Texas Tech (42–4)	Texas (38–8)	Arkansas (41–10)	Arkansas (42–11)	Nebraska (52–8)	5.
6.	Florida	Florida State (5–0)	Nebraska (6–4)	Florida (19–0)	Alabama (20–0)	Alabama (23–0)	Alabama (26–1)	Nebraska (24–5)	Arkansas (30–5)	Arkansas (32–5)	Arkansas (35–6)	Arkansas (36–8)	UCLA (44–5)	Texas (39–10)	Texas Tech (52–6)	UCLA (53–10)	6.
7.	Florida State	UCLA (5–0)	Florida State (8–2)	Alabama (13–0)	UCLA (18–3)	UCLA (21–3)	UCLA (25–3)	Alabama (29–2)	Florida (33–4)	Florida (36–5)	Florida (40–5)	UCLA (41–5)	Arkansas (39–9)	Tennessee (42–9)	UCLA (47–8)	Arkansas (47–13)	7.
8.	Arkansas	Nebraska (3–2)т	Arkansas (8–1)	Arkansas (13–1)	Florida (23–1)	Florida (25–1)	Florida (29–1)	UCLA (27–3)	Tennessee (30–5)	UCLA (33–5)	UCLA (37–5)	Florida (44–6)	Florida (45–7)	UCLA (45–7)	Tennessee (42–10)	Mississippi State (43–21)	8.
9.	Nebraska	Texas A&M (4–1)т	Alabama (9–0)	UCLA (13–3)	Arkansas (19–1)	Arkansas (22–2)	Arkansas (23–4)	Arkansas (27–4)	UCLA (29–5)	Florida State (35–4)	Tennessee (36–6)	Tennessee (37–7)	Tennessee (39–8)	Florida (47–9)	Florida State (49–8)	Oklahoma (52–10)	9.
10.	UCLA	LSU (6–0)	Stanford (8–1)	Florida State (12–4)	Florida State (17–4)	Florida State (21–4)	Florida State (25–4)	Florida State (28–4)	Florida State (32–4)	Tennessee (32–6)	Virginia Tech (36–6)	Texas A&M (34–12)	Florida State (43–7)	Florida State (46–8)	Florida (48–10)	Florida (52–12)	10.
11.	Texas A&M	Arkansas (4–1)	UCLA (7–3)	Georgia (13–4)	Virginia Tech (16–2)	Virginia Tech (21–2)	Arizona (21–7)	Georgia (23–8)	Georgia (27–8)	Arizona (29–8)	Texas A&M (30–12)	Georgia (33–12)	Duke (38–13)	Oregon (40–11)	Georgia (38–18)	Georgia (41–20)	11.
12.	Clemson	Stanford (5–0)	Georgia (9–2)	Virginia Tech (11–2)	Georgia (17–5)т	Arizona (20–5)	Mississippi State (27–4)	Virginia Tech (28–4)	Virginia Tech (31–4)	Virginia Tech (33–5)	Florida State (36–7)	Duke (35–12)	Texas A&M (35–14)	Duke (38–13)	Duke (39–14)	Duke (43–17)	12.
13.	LSU	Alabama (5–0)	Texas A&M (7–3)	Stanford (10–4)	Oklahoma State (15–5)т	Georgia (19–7)	Georgia (20–7)	Arizona (23–8)	Arizona (27–8)	Texas A&M (26–12)	Georgia (31–11)	Florida State (39–7)	Oklahoma State (34–13)	Georgia (36–17)т	Oregon (40–12)	Arizona State (45–18)	13.
14.	South Carolina	Oregon (2–3)	Oregon (5–4)т	Arizona (12–5)	Arizona (17–5)	Mississippi State (24–2)	Virginia Tech (23–4)	Mississippi State (29–6)	Washington (30–6)	Georgia (28–10)	Mississippi State (34–11)т	Oregon (35–9)	Georgia (34–16)	Texas A&M (36–16)т	Virginia Tech (46–10)	Oklahoma State (41–17)	14.
15.	Georgia	Arizona (3–2)	Duke (7–3)т	Texas A&M (10–6)	Texas A&M (15–7)	Oklahoma State (17–7)	Texas A&M (19–8)	Texas A&M (22–9)	Texas A&M (24–11)	Mississippi State (33–9)	Duke (31–12)т	LSU (32–14)	Oregon (38–10)	Oklahoma State (37–14)	Oklahoma State (38–15)	LSU (40–19)	15.
16.	Alabama	Virginia Tech (5–0)	Arizona (8–3)	Oklahoma State (11–4)	LSU (17–4)	Texas A&M (17–8)	Oregon (21–7)	Washington (26–6)	Mississippi State (31–7)	Duke (28–11)	Arizona (30–11)	Virginia Tech (38–8)	Mississippi State (36–15)	Virginia Tech (44–9)	Texas A&M (36–17)	UCF (41–19–1)	16.
17.	Stanford	Georgia (4–1)	LSU (7–4)	LSU (12–4)т	Mississippi State (18–2)	LSU (17–7)	Washington (22–6)	Oregon (23–8)	Virginia (31–3)	Oregon (29–9)	LSU (28–14)	Oklahoma State (30–12)	Virginia Tech (41–9)	Stanford (36–12)	Stanford (37–13)	Florida (52–10)	17.
18.	Arizona	Clemson (3–2)	Mississippi State (10–0)	Oregon (8–6)т	Oregon (13–6)	Virginia (22–2)	Virginia (25–3)	Virginia (27–3)	Oregon (26–9)	LSU (25–13)	Oregon (32–9)	Stanford (30–12)	Stanford (34–12)	LSU (37–16)	LSU (37–17)	Virginia Tech (48–12)	18.
19.	Duke	Duke (4–1)	Oklahoma State (6–4)	Mississippi State (14–1)	Stanford (11–6)	Oregon (18–7)	LSU (18–9)	Duke (22–10)	Duke (24–11)	Washington (31–9)	Stanford (26–12)	Mississippi State (34–14)	LSU (33–16)	Mississippi State (37–17)	Arizona State (41–16)	Texas A&M (38–19)	19.
20.	Oklahoma State	South Carolina (3–2)	Virginia Tech (7–2)	Duke (9–7)	Virginia (19–1)	Stanford (14–6)	Duke (18–10)	LSU (21–10)	LSU (23–12)	Oklahoma State (25–10)	Washington (34–9)	Arizona (31–13)	Arizona (34–13)	Arizona (35–15)	Mississippi State (38–18)	Oregon (41–14)	20.
21.	Virginia Tech	Mississippi State (4–0)	Arizona State (10–1)	Virginia (12–1)	Arizona State (19–3)	Washington (19–6)	Oklahoma State (18–9)	Oklahoma State (21–10)	Oklahoma State (25–10)	Virginia (31–6)	Oklahoma State (27–11)	UCF (35–12–1)	South Carolina (29–22)	Clemson (32–19)	Arizona (35–16)	Arizona (37–18)	21.
22.	Ole Miss	Arizona State (4–1)	South Carolina (7–2)	South Carolina (9–5)	Washington (15–6)	UCF (22–5)	Grand Canyon (30–0)	Stanford (18–8)	Grand Canyon (36–2)	UCF (30–10–1)	UCF (32–11–1)	Washington (34–12)	Clemson (32–19)	UCF (38–15–1)	Clemson (32–20)	Stanford (39–15)	22.
23.	Liberty	Oklahoma State (3–2)	Washington (7–3)	Arizona State (13–3)	Grand Canyon (22–0)	Grand Canyon (27–0)	Stanford (15–8)	Grand Canyon (33–1)	Arizona State (28–9)	Stanford (22–12)	Virginia (33–8)	Clemson (30–17)	UCF (36–14–1)	South Carolina (30–25)	UCF (38–16–1)	Grand Canyon (54–10)	23.
24.	Mississippi State	Washington (2–3)	Clemson (6–4)	Washington (10–6)	South Carolina (15–6)	South Carolina (15–9)	South Carolina (19–10)	South Carolina (21–12)	Stanford (20–10)	South Carolina (23–17)	Grand Canyon (41–4)	South Carolina (26–21)	Louisville (41–10)	Louisville (43–11)	Louisville (44–12)	Clemson (34–22)	24.
25.	Washington	Virginia (4–1)	Virginia (7–1)	Grand Canyon (16–0)	Duke (12–9)	Duke (15–9)	UCF (23–7)	Arizona State (23–9)	UCF (24–10)	Grand Canyon (37–4)	South Carolina (23–20)	Louisville (38–9)	Washington (34–15)	Arizona State (38–16)т; Grand Canyon (48–7)т	Grand Canyon (52–8)	Ole Miss (36–26)т South Carolina (32–28)т	25.
	Preseason Jan 20	Week 1 Feb 10	Week 2 Feb 17	Week 3 Feb 24	Week 4 Mar 3	Week 5 Mar 10	Week 6 Mar 17	Week 7 Mar 24	Week 8 Mar 31	Week 9 Apr 7	Week 10 Apr 14	Week 11 Apr 21	Week 12 Apr 28	Week 13 May 5	Week 14 May 12	Final Jun 9	
		Dropped: No. 22 Ole Miss; No. 23 Liberty	None	Dropped: No. 24 Clemson	None	Dropped: No. 21 Arizona State	None	Dropped: No. 25 UCF	Dropped: No. 24 South Carolina	Dropped: No. 23 Arizona State	None	Dropped: No. 23 Virginia; No. 24 Grand Canyon	None	Dropped: No. 25 Washington	None	Dropped: No. 24 Louisville	

== D1Softball ==
	Preseason Jan 20	Week 1 Feb 10	Week 2 Feb 17	Week 3 Feb 24	Week 4 Mar 3	Week 5 Mar 10	Week 6 Mar 17	Week 7 Mar 24	Week 8 Mar 31	Week 9 Apr 7	Week 10 Apr 14	Week 11 Apr 21	Week 12 Apr 28	Week 13 May 5	Final June 9	
1.	Texas	Texas Tech (6–0)	Tennessee (10–0)	Tennessee (14–0)	Tennessee (19–0)	Tennessee (23–0)	Tennessee (27–1)	Texas (28–1)	Texas (31–2)	Texas Tech (38–2)	Oklahoma (40–4)	Oklahoma (42–6)	Oklahoma (46–6)	Oklahoma (48–7)	Texas (53–12)	1.
2.	Texas Tech	Texas (4–1)	Texas (9–1)	Texas (14–1)	Texas (19–1)	Texas (22–1)	Texas (26–1)	Texas Tech (30–2)	Texas Tech (34–2)	Oklahoma (38–3)	Alabama (39–3)	Alabama (42–4)	Nebraska (40–6)	Nebraska (43–6)	Texas Tech (60–10)	2.
3.	Oklahoma	Tennessee (5–0)	Texas Tech (11–1)	Texas Tech (16–1)	Texas Tech (22–1)	Texas Tech (25–1)	Texas Tech (27–2)	Florida (31–2)	Oklahoma (34–3)	Alabama (35–3)	Texas Tech (41–3)	Texas Tech (42–4)	Texas Tech (47–4)	Alabama (47–6)	Alabama (56–9)	3.
4.	Tennessee	Oklahoma (3–1)	Oklahoma (8–1)	Florida (19–0)	Oklahoma (19–2)	Oklahoma (24–2)	Alabama (26–1)	Tennessee (28–3)	Alabama (33–2)	Texas (32–4)	Texas (33–6)	Nebraska (36–6)	Alabama (44–6)	Texas Tech (49–5)	Tennessee (49–12)	4.
5.	Florida	Florida (5–0)	Florida (12–0)	Oklahoma (13–2)	Alabama (20–0)	Alabama (23–0)	Oklahoma (28–2)	Oklahoma (32–2)	Nebraska (26–6)	Nebraska (30–6)	Nebraska (33–6)	Texas (35–7)	Texas (38–8)	Arkansas (41–10)	Nebraska (52–8)	5.
6.	Oregon	Florida State (5–0)	Nebraska (6–4)	Nebraska (11–4)	Arkansas (19–1)	Arkansas (22–2)	Nebraska (21–5)	Alabama (29–2)	Arkansas (30–5)	Arkansas (33–5)	Arkansas (35–6)	Arkansas (36–8)	UCLA (44–5)	Texas (39–10)	UCLA (53–10)	6.
7.	Florida State	UCLA (5–0)	Arkansas (8–1)	Arkansas (13–1)	Nebraska (14–5)	Nebraska (18–5)	Florida (29–1)	Nebraska (24–5)	Florida (33–4)	Florida (36–5)	Florida (40–5)	Florida (43–6)	Tennessee (40–8)	Tennessee (42–9)	Arkansas (47–13)	7.
8.	Arkansas	Nebraska (3–2)	Florida State (8–2)	Alabama (13–0)	UCLA (18–3)	UCLA (21–3)	UCLA (25–3)	UCLA (28–3)	Tennessee (30–5)	Florida State (35–4)	Tennessee (37–6)	UCLA (41–5)	Arkansas (39–9)	Florida State (46–8)	Mississippi State (43–21)	8.
9.	Nebraska	Arkansas (4–1)	Alabama (9–0)	UCLA (13–3)	Florida (23–1)	Florida (26–1)	Arkansas (23–4)	Arkansas (27–4)	Florida State (32–4)	Tennessee (32–6)	UCLA (37–5)	Tennessee (37–7)	Florida (45–7)	Florida (47–9)	Oklahoma (52–10)	9.
10.	UCLA	Alabama (5–0)	Stanford (8–1)	Florida State (12–4)	Florida State (17–4)	Virginia Tech (21–2)	Florida State (25–4)	Florida State (28–4)	UCLA (29–5)	UCLA (33–5)	Virginia Tech (36–6)	Florida State (39–7)	Florida State (43–7)	Oregon (40–11)	Florida (52–12)	10.
11.	Texas A&M	Stanford (5–0)	Georgia (9–2)	Georgia (13–4)	Virginia Tech (16–2)	Florida State (21–4)	Mississippi State (27–4)	Virginia Tech (28–4)	Virginia Tech (31–4)	Virginia Tech (33–5)	Florida State (36–7)	Texas A&M (34–12)	Duke (38–13)	UCLA (45–7)	Georgia (41–20)	11.
12.	LSU	LSU (6–0)	UCLA (7–3)	Virginia Tech (11–2)	Oklahoma State (15–5)	Mississippi State (24–2)	Arizona (21–7)	Georgia (23–8)	Georgia (27–8)	Arizona (29–9)	Georgia (31–11)	Georgia (33–13)	Oklahoma State (34–12)	Georgia (36–17)	Arizona State (45–18)	12.
13.	South Carolina	Texas A&M (4–1)	Texas A&M (7–3)	Stanford (10–4)	Mississippi State (18–2)	Arizona (20–5)	Virginia Tech (23–4)	Arizona (23–8)	Arizona (27–8)	Georgia (28–10)	Texas A&M (30–12)	Duke (35–12)	Georgia (34–16)	Duke (38–13)	Duke (43–17)	13.
14.	Alabama	Virginia Tech (5–0)	Mississippi State (10–0)	Mississippi State (14–1)	Arizona (17–5)	Georgia (19–7)	Georgia (20–7)	Mississippi State (29–6)	Mississippi State (32–7)	Texas A&M (26–12)	Mississippi State (34–11)	Oklahoma State (30–12)	Oregon (38–10)	Oklahoma State (37–13)	Oklahoma State (41–17)	14.
15.	Clemson	Arizona (3–2)	Arizona (8–3)	Oklahoma State (11–4)	Georgia (17–5)	Oklahoma State (17–7)	Texas A&M (19–8)	Texas A&M (22–9)	Texas A&M (24–11)	Mississippi State (33–9)	Duke (31–12)	Oregon (35–9)	Texas A&M (35–14)	Virginia Tech (44–9)	UCF (41–19–1)	15.
16.	Duke	Oregon (2–3)	Oregon (5–4)	Arizona (12–5)	Virginia (19–1)	Virginia (22–2)	Virginia (25–3)	Washington (26–6)	Washington (30–6)	Duke (28–11)	Arizona (30–11)	Virginia Tech (38–8)	Mississippi State (36–15)	Texas A&M (36–16)	LSU (40–19)	16.
17.	Georgia	Mississippi State (4–0)	Duke (7–3)	Texas A&M (10–6)	Oregon (13–6)	UCF (22–5)	Oregon (21–7)	Virginia (27–3)	Virginia (31–3)	Oregon (29–9)	Oregon (32–9)	LSU (32–14)	Virginia Tech (41–9)	LSU (37–16)	Florida State (52–10)	17.
18.	Stanford	Duke (4–1)	Oklahoma State (6–4)	Oregon (8–6)	Texas A&M (15–7)	Texas A&M (17–8)	Grand Canyon (30–0)	Oregon (24–8)	Duke (24–11)	Oklahoma State (25–10)	LSU (28–14)	Mississippi State (34–14)	Arizona (34–13)	Mississippi State (37–17)	Texas A&M (38–19)	18.
19.	Oklahoma State	Georgia (4–1)	South Carolina (7–2)	LSU (12–4)	LSU (17–4)	Stanford (14–6)	Washington (22–6)	Duke (22–10)	Oklahoma State (25–10)	Virginia (31–6)	Oklahoma State (27–11)	Arizona (31–13)	Stanford (34–12)	Stanford (36–12)	Virginia Tech (48–12)	19.
20.	Virginia Tech	South Carolina (3–2)	LSU (7–4)	Virginia (12–1)	Stanford (11–6)	LSU (17–7)	Oklahoma State (18–9)	Oklahoma State (21–10)	Oregon (26–9)	LSU (25–13)	Washington (34–9)	Stanford (30–12)	LSU (33–16)	Arizona (35–15)	Arizona (37–18)	20.
21.	Arizona	Washington (2–3)	Washington (7–3)	Duke (9–7)	Arizona State (19–3)	Oregon (18–7)	Duke (18–10)	Grand Canyon (33–1)	Grand Canyon (36–2)	UCF (30–10–1)	UCF (32–11–1)	UCF (35–12–1)	UCF (36–14–1)	UCF (38–15–1)	Oregon (41–14)	21.
22.	Washington	Clemson (3–2)	Arizona State (10–1)	South Carolina (9–5)	Grand Canyon (22–0)	Grand Canyon (27–0)	UCF (23–7)	LSU (21–10)	LSU (23–12)	Washington (31–9)	Stanford (26–12)	Washington (34–12)	Clemson (32–19)	Clemson (32–19)	Stanford (39–15)	22.
23.	Mississippi State	Virginia (4–1)	Virginia (7–1)	Grand Canyon (16–0)	South Carolina (15–6)	Washington (19–6)	LSU (18–9)	Arizona State (23–9)	Arizona State (28–9)	Grand Canyon (37–4)	Virginia (33–8)	Arizona State (35–13)	South Carolina (29–22)	Arizona State (38–16)	Grand Canyon (54–10)	23.
24.	Ole Miss	Oklahoma State (3–2)	Virginia Tech (7–2)	Arizona State (13–3)	Penn State (16–4)	South Carolina (15–9)	Arizona State (22–7)	Stanford (18–8)	UCF (28–10)	Arizona State (29–11)	Grand Canyon (41–4)	Clemson (30–17)	Washington (34–15)	Louisville (43–11)	Saint Mary's (42–16)	24.
25.	Virginia	Florida Atlantic (5–0)	UCF (9–3)	Penn State (13–2)	UCF (20–4)	Clemson (16–8)	South Carolina (19–10)	UCF (24–10)	Stanford (20–10)	Kansas (27–11)	Marshall (32–10)	Louisville (38–9)	Louisville (41–10)	South Carolina (30–25)	Virginia (40–15)	25.
	Preseason Jan 20	Week 1 Feb 10	Week 2 Feb 17	Week 3 Feb 24	Week 4 Mar 3	Week 5 Mar 10	Week 6 Mar 17	Week 7 Mar 24	Week 8 Mar 31	Week 9 Apr 7	Week 10 Apr 14	Week 11 Apr 21	Week 12 Apr 28	Week 13 May 5	Final June 9	
		Dropped: No. 24 Ole Miss	Dropped: No. 22 Clemson; No. 25 Florida Atlantic	Dropped: No. 21 Washington; No. 25 UCF	Dropped: No. 21 Duke	Dropped: No. 21 Arizona State; No. 24 Penn State	Dropped: No. 19 Stanford; No. 25 Clemson	Dropped: No. 25 South Carolina	None	Dropped: No. 25 Stanford	Dropped: No. 24 Arizona State; No. 25 Kansas	Dropped: No. 23 Virginia; No. 24 Grand Canyon; No. 25 Marshall	Dropped: No. 23 Arizona State	Dropped: No. 24 Washington	Dropped: 22. Clemson; 24. Louisville; 25. South Carolina	

== Softball America ==
	Preseason Jan 13	Week 1 Feb 9	Week 2 Feb 16	Week 3 Feb 23	Week 4 Mar 2	Week 5 Mar 9	Week 6 Mar 16	Week 7 Mar 23	Week 8 Mar 30	Week 9 Apr 6	Week 10 Apr 13	Week 11 Apr 20	Week 12 Apr 27	Week 13 May 4	Final June 8	
1.	Texas Tech	Texas Tech (6–0)	Tennessee (10–0)	Tennessee (14–0)	Tennessee (19–0)	Tennessee (23–0)	Tennessee (27–1)	Texas (28–1)	Texas (31–2)	Alabama (35–3)	Oklahoma (40–4)	Nebraska (36–6)	Oklahoma (46–6)	Oklahoma (48–7)	Texas (53–12)	1.
2.	Texas	Tennessee (5–0)	Texas Tech (11–1)	Texas Tech (16–1)	Texas Tech (22–1)	Texas (22–1)	Texas (26–1)	Texas Tech (30–2)	Texas Tech (34–2)	Texas Tech (38–2)	Alabama (39–3)	Oklahoma (42–6)	Nebraska (40–6)	Nebraska (43–6)	Texas Tech (61–10)	2.
3.	Oklahoma	Texas (4–1)	Texas (9–1)	Texas (14–1)	Texas (19–1)	Texas Tech (25–1)	Texas Tech (27–2)	Florida (31–2)	Oklahoma (34–3)	Oklahoma (38–3)	Nebraska (33–6)	Alabama (42–4)	Alabama (44–5)	Texas Tech (50–5)	Alabama (56–9)	3.
4.	Tennessee	Oklahoma (3–1)	Oklahoma (8–1)	Alabama (13–0)	Alabama (22–0)	Alabama (23–0)	Alabama (26–1)	Tennessee (28–3)	Alabama (33–2)	Texas (32–4)	Texas Tech (40–3)	Texas Tech (42–4)	Texas Tech (47–4)	Alabama (47–6)	Tennessee (49–12)	4.
5.	Oregon	Florida State (5–0)	Florida State (8–2)	Arkansas (13–1)	Arkansas (22–1)	Arkansas (21–2)	Oklahoma (28–2)	Oklahoma (31–2)	Nebraska (26–6)	Nebraska (30–6)	Arkansas (35–6)	UCLA (41–5)	UCLA (44–5)	Arkansas (41–10)	Nebraska (52–8)	5.
6.	Florida State	UCLA (5–0)	Alabama (9–0)	Florida (19–0)	Oklahoma (19–2)	Oklahoma (24–2)	UCLA (25–3)	Alabama (29–2)	Arkansas (30–5)	Florida State (35–4)	UCLA (37–5)	Arkansas (36–8)	Texas (39–8)	Tennessee (42–9)	UCLA (53–10)	6.
7.	Arkansas	Florida (5–0)	Arkansas (8–1)	Oklahoma (13–2)	UCLA (18–3)	UCLA (21–3)	Florida (29–1)	UCLA (27–3)	Florida (33–4)	Arkansas (32–5)	Florida (40–5)	Florida (44–6)	Arkansas (39–9)	Florida State (46–8)	Arkansas (47–13)	7.
8.	UCLA	Alabama (5–0)	Florida (12–0)	Nebraska (11–4)	Florida (23–1)	Florida (25–1)	Nebraska (21–5)	Nebraska (24–5)	Florida State (32–4)	Florida (36–5)	Texas (33–6)	Texas (34–7)	Florida State (43–7)	Texas (39–10)	Mississippi State (43–12)	8.
9.	Clemson	Arkansas (4–1)	Georgia (9–2)	Florida State (12–4)	Nebraska (14–5)	Nebraska (18–5)	Arkansas (23–4)	Arkansas (27–4)	UCLA (29–5)	UCLA (33–5)	Tennessee (36–6)	Texas A&M (34–12)	Florida (45–7)	Oregon (40–11)	Florida (52–12)	9.
10.	Florida	LSU (6–0)	Nebraska (6–4)	UCLA (13–3)	Florida State (17–4)	Virginia Tech (21–2)	Florida State (25–4)	Florida State (28–4)	Georgia (27–8)	Tennessee (32–6)	Virginia Tech (36–6)	Duke (35–12)	Duke (38–13)	UCLA (45–7)	Oklahoma (52–10)	10.
11.	Nebraska	Texas A&M (4–1)	Stanford (8–1)	Virginia Tech (11–2)	Virginia Tech (16–2)	Florida State (21–4)	Georgia (20–7)	Georgia (23–8)	Tennessee (30–5)	Virginia Tech (33–5)	Texas A&M (30–12)	Tennessee (37–7)	Tennessee (39–8)	Duke (38–13)	Arizona State (45–18)	11.
12.	LSU	Stanford (5–0)	UCLA (7–3)	Georgia (13–4)	Georgia (17–5)	Virginia (22–2)	Virginia (25–3)	Virginia (27–3)	Virginia (31–3)	Arizona (29–8)	Florida State (36–7)	Florida State (39–7)	Oklahoma State (34–13)	Florida (47–9)	Georgia (41–20)	12.
13.	Alabama	Nebraska (3–2)	Mississippi State (10–0)	Oklahoma State (11–4)	Oklahoma State (15–5)	Mississippi State (24–2)	Mississippi State (27–4)	Virginia Tech (28–4)	Virginia Tech (31–4)	Texas A&M (26–12)	Georgia (31–11)	Georgia (33–12)	Oregon (38–10)	Oklahoma State (37–14)	Duke (43–17)	13.
14.	Texas A&M	Oregon (2–3)	Texas A&M (7–3)	Oregon (8–6)	Oregon (13–6)	Georgia (19–7)	Virginia Tech (23–4)	Mississippi State (29–6)	Arizona (27–8)	Georgia (28–10)	Duke (31–12)	LSU (32–14)	Texas A&M (35–14)	Georgia (36–17)	Oklahoma State (41–17)	14.
15.	Georgia	Arizona (3–2)	Oregon (5–4)	Virginia (12–1)	Virginia (19–1)	UCF (22–5)	Arizona (21–7)	Arizona (23–8)	Mississippi State (31–7)	Duke (28–11)	LSU (28–14)	Oregon (35–9)	Georgia (34–16)	Stanford (36–12)	UCF (41–19–1)	15.
16.	South Carolina	Virginia Tech (5–0)	Arizona (8–3)	Mississippi State (14–1)	LSU (17–4)	Oklahoma State (17–7)	Oregon (21–7)	Oregon (23–8)	Oregon (26–9)	Mississippi State (33–9)	Arizona (30–11)	Virginia Tech (38–8)	Stanford (34–12)	Texas A&M (36–16)	LSU (40–19)	16.
17.	Arizona	Clemson (3–2)	Duke (7–3)	LSU (12–4)	Mississippi State (18–2)	Arizona (20–5)	Texas A&M (19–8)	Texas A&M (22–9)	Texas A&M (24–11)	Oregon (29–9)	Oregon (32–9)	UCF (35–12–1)	Virginia Tech (41–9)	LSU (37–16)	Florida State (52–10)	17.
18.	Stanford	Mississippi State (4–0)	Virginia Tech (7–2)	Texas A&M (10–6)	Arizona (17–5)	Oregon (18–7)	Grand Canyon (30–0)	Duke (22–10)	Washington (30–6)	LSU (25–13)	Mississippi State (34–11)	Oklahoma State (30–12)	Mississippi State (36–15)	Virginia Tech (44–9)	Texas A&M (38–19)	18.
19.	Oklahoma State	Georgia (4–1)	South Carolina (7–2)	Arizona (12–5)	Texas A&M (15–7)	LSU (17–7)	Washington (22–6)	Washington (26–6)	Duke (24–11)	UCF (30–10–1)	Washington (34–9)	Arizona (31–13)	LSU (33–16)	Mississippi State (37–17)	Oregon (41–14)	19.
20.	Duke	South Carolina (3–2)	LSU (7–4)	Stanford (10–4)	Grand Canyon (22–0)	Stanford (14–6)	Duke (18–10)	LSU (21–10)	LSU (23–12)	Oklahoma State (25–10)	UCF (32–11–1)	Stanford (30–12)	Arizona (34–13)	Louisville (43–11)	Virginia Tech (48–12)	20.
21.	Mississippi State	Virginia (4–1)	Virginia (7–1)	South Carolina (9–5)	Stanford (11–6)	Grand Canyon (27–0)	UCF (23–7)	Clemson (22–10)	UCF (28–10)	Virginia (31–6)	Stanford (26–12)	Mississippi State (34–14)	South Carolina (29–22)	UCF (38–15–1)	Stanford (39–15)	21.
22.	Washington	Duke (4–1)	Oklahoma State (6–4)	Duke (9–7)	Penn State (16–4)	Texas A&M (17–8)	Oklahoma State (18–9)	UCF (24–10)	Arizona State (28–9)	Washington (31–9)	Oklahoma State (27–11)	Louisville (38–9)	Louisville (41–10)	Clemson (32–19)	Arizona (37–18)	22.
23.	Virginia	Florida Atlantic (5–0)	Washington (7–3)	Grand Canyon (16–0)	UCF (20–4)	Washington (19–6)	Clemson (19–9)	Oklahoma State (21–10)	Oklahoma State (25–10)	Kansas (27–11)	Southeastern Louisiana (37–9)	Washington (34–12)	UCF (36–14–1)	South Carolina (30–25)	Grand Canyon (54–10)	23.
24.	Virginia Tech	Washington (2–3)	Arizona State (10–1)	Penn State (13–2)	South Carolina (15–6)	Auburn (19–7)	Baylor (20–7)	Grand Canyon (33–1)	Grand Canyon (36–2)	Louisville (32–8)	Kansas (29–12)	Clemson (30–17)	Clemson (32–19)	Arizona (35–16)	Virginia (40–15)	24.
25.	Ole Miss	Oklahoma State (3–2)	UCF (8–3)	North Carolina (14–0)	Washington (15–6)	Utah (21–5)	LSU (18–9)	Stanford (18–8)	Clemson (23–13)	Southeastern Louisiana (33–9)	Louisville (34–9)	Southeastern Louisiana (41–11)	Southeastern Louisiana (44–12)	Indiana (41–13)	Indiana (43–16)	25.
	Preseason Jan 13	Week 1 Feb 9	Week 2 Feb 16	Week 3 Feb 23	Week 4 Mar 2	Week 5 Mar 9	Week 6 Mar 16	Week 7 Mar 23	Week 8 Mar 30	Week 9 Apr 6	Week 10 Apr 13	Week 11 Apr 20	Week 12 Apr 27	Week 13 May 4	Final June 8	
		Dropped: No. 25 Ole Miss	Dropped: No. 17 Clemson; No. 23 Florida Atlantic	Dropped: No. 23 Washington; No. 24 Arizona State; No. 25 UCF	Dropped: No. 22 Duke; No. 25 North Carolina	Dropped: No. 22 Penn State; No. 24 South Carolina	Dropped: No. 20 Stanford; No. 24 Auburn; No. 25 Utah	Dropped: No. 24 Baylor	Dropped: No. 25 Stanford	Dropped: No. 22 Arizona State; No. 24 Grand Canyon; No. 25 Clemson	Dropped: No. 21 Virginia	Dropped: No. 24 Kansas	Dropped: No. 23 Washington	Dropped: No. 25 Southeastern Louisiana	Dropped: 20. Louisville; 22. Clemson; 23. South Carolina	
