= Teagan Kavan =

American softball player (born 2005)

Texas Longhorns – No. 17
- Pitcher
- Born: February 28, 2005 (age 21); West Des Moines, Iowa, U.S.

Teams
- Texas (2024–present)

Career highlights and awards
- 2× Women's College World Series champion (2025, 2026); 2× Women's College World Series Most Outstanding Player (2025, 2026); Big 12 Freshman of the Year (2024); 3× WCWS All-Tournament Team (2024–2026); 2× Second-team All-American (2025, 2026); Freshman All-American (2024); 2× All-SEC First team (2025, 2026); All-Big 12 First team (2024); All-Big 12 Freshman Team (2024)

Teagan Kavan (born February 28, 2005) is an American college softball pitcher for Texas. She is a two-time Women's College World Series Most Outstanding Player.

== High school career ==
Kavan attended Dowling Catholic High School in West Des Moines, Iowa. She played travel softball for Iowa Premier Fastpitch, where she recorded 1,444 strikeouts in 772 2/3 innings, with 45 shutouts and six no-hitters.

On November 9, 2022, she signed her national letter of intent to play college softball at Texas.

== College career ==
As a freshman during the 2024 season, Kavan appeared in 31 games, with 24 starts, and posted a 20–3 record and four saves, with a 2.20 earned run average (ERA), 135 strikeouts, nine complete games and six shutouts in 130 2/3 innings. Following the season she was named an All-Big 12 first team and All-Big 12 freshman team selection, and named the Big 12 Freshman of the Year. She was also named a top-ten finalist for the NFCA National Freshman of the Year. During the first game of the 2024 Women's College World Series against Stanford, she became the first freshman pitcher in program history to pitch a complete game shutout at the Women's College World Series. She helped Texas advance to the Women's College World Series finals, before being eliminated by Oklahoma. She was subsequently named to the all-tournament team.

As a sophomore during the 2025 season, she appeared in 43 games, with 33 starts, and posted a 28–5 record and four saves, with a 2.16 ERA, 230 strikeouts, 18 complete games and five shutouts in 207 innings. Following the season she was named to the All-SEC first team and a second-team All-American. On May 31, 2025, during the second round of the 2025 Women's College World Series against Oklahoma, she pitched a complete game, allowing only two runs on seven hits with eight strikeouts to advance to the semifinals. This marked the first time Texas defeated Oklahoma in the Women's College World Series. Kavan's grandmother, Anna, died earlier that morning. During the World Series, she allowed no earned runs in all 31 2/3 innings she pitched. She went 4–0 with a save to help Texas win their first national championship in program history. She was subsequently named Women's College World Series Most Outstanding Player.

As a junior during the 2026 season, she appeared in 46 games, with 37 starts, and posted a 28–6 record and five saves, with a 2.33 ERA, 260 strikeouts, 21 complete games and eight shutouts in 228 2/3 innings. Following the season she was named to the All-SEC first team and a second-team All-American. During the 2026 Women's College World Series, she recorded 30 strikeouts in 33 1/3 innings pitched. She went 4–1 with two saves to help Texas win their second consecutive national championship. She was subsequently named Women's College World Series Most Outstanding Player for the second time in her career, becoming the first two-time winner of the award.
