= 2026 NCAA Division I softball tournament =

College softball tournament

- Teams: 64
- Finals site: Devon Park; Oklahoma City
- Champions: Texas (2nd title)
- Runner-up: Texas Tech (2nd WCWS Appearance)
- Winning coach: Mike White (2nd title)
- MOP: Teagan Kavan (Texas)

The 2026 NCAA Division I softball tournament was held from May 15 through June 4, 2026, as the final part of the 2026 NCAA Division I softball season. The tournament ended with the 2026 Women's College World Series at Devon Park in Oklahoma City.

== Format ==
A total of 64 teams entered the tournament, with 31 of them receiving an automatic bid by either winning their conference's tournament or by finishing in first place in their conference. The remaining 33 bids will be at-large, with selections extended by the NCAA Selection Committee.

For the first time in NCAA tournament history the top 32 teams were seeded nationally in pods of four. Per the established bracketing principles, the top 16 seeds were provided the opportunity to host. Additionally, team pairings are determined within the pods (ones paired with eights, twos paired with sevens, etc.) and assigned geographically within their pods, with the exception that teams from the same conference are not paired at the same regional.

== Bids ==
The West Coast Conference bid was awarded to the regular-season champion. All other conferences had their automatic bid go to the conference tournament winner.

=== Automatic ===
Conference	School	Best finish	Last appearance
America East	Binghamton	Regionals (2015, 2025)	2025
American	South Florida	WCWS (2012)	2025
ASUN	Stetson	Regionals (1986, 1987, 1988, 2007, 2014)	2014
ACC	Florida State	National Champion (2018)	2025
Atlantic 10	Fordham	Regionals (2010, 2011, 2013, 2014, 2015, 2016, 2017, 2018, 2019, 2022)	2022
Big 12	Arizona State	National Champion (2008, 2011)	2025
Big East	UConn	WCWS (1993)	2025
Big Sky	Idaho State	First appearance	
Big South	USC Upstate	Regionals (2013, 2014, 2015, 2016, 2017, 2024, 2025)	2025
Big Ten	Nebraska	WCWS Runners-Up (1985 (vacated))	2025
Big West	Cal State Fullerton	National Champion (1986)	2024
CAA	Charleston	Regionals (2005)	2005
Conference USA	Jacksonville State	Regionals (1996, 2008, 2009, 2010, 2011, 2013, 2016, 2017)	2017
Horizon	Northern Kentucky	Regionals (2023)	2023
Ivy League	Princeton	WCWS (1995, 1996)	2024
MAAC	Marist	Regionals (1996, 2006, 2013, 2016, 2023, 2025)	2025
MAC	Akron	First appearance	
MEAC	Howard	Regionals (2007, 2022, 2025)	2025
Missouri Valley	Belmont	Regionals (2025)	2025
Mountain West	Grand Canyon	Regionals (2022, 2023, 2024, 2025)	2025
NEC	Wagner	First appearance	
Ohio Valley	Eastern Illinois	Regionals (Note: Eastern Illinois appeared in the 1971 and 1974 Women's College World Series while the tournament was governed by the AIAW, before the NCAA started sponsoring women's athletics in 1982. EIU's best pre-NCAA finish was 5th place in 1974.) (2023, 2025)	2025
Patriot	Boston University	Regionals (1996, 2002, 2003, 2009, 2010, 2012, 2014, 2016, 2018, 2019, 2021, 2023, 2024, 2025)	2025
SEC	Texas	National Champion (2025)	2025
Southern	UNC Greensboro	Regionals (1997, 2018, 2021, 2023)	2023
Southland	McNeese	Regionals (1995, 2005, 2010, 2016, 2017, 2018, 2021, 2022, 2023)	2023
SWAC	Florida A&M	Regionals (1995, 1997, 1998, 1999, 2005, 2006, 2009, 2014, 2015, 2016, 2017)	2017
Summit	South Dakota	First appearance (Note: South Dakota appeared in the 1971 Women's College World Series while the tournament was governed by the AIAW, before the NCAA started sponsoring women's athletics in 1982.)	
Sun Belt	South Alabama	Regionals (2012, 2013, 2014, 2015, 2021, 2024)	2024
WAC	California Baptist	First appearance	
West Coast	Saint Mary's	Regionals (2010, 2024)	2024

=== At-large ===
Team	Conference	Best Finish	Last Appearance
Alabama	SEC	National Champion (2012)	2025
Arizona	Big 12	National Champion (1991, 1993, 1994, 1996, 1997, 2001, 2006, 2007)	2025
Arkansas	SEC	Super Regionals (2018, 2021, 2022, 2025)	2025
Baylor	Big 12	WCWS (2007, 2011, 2014, 2017)	2024
Clemson	ACC	Super Regionals (2022, 2023, 2025)	2025
Duke	ACC	WCWS (2024)	2025
Florida	SEC	National Champion (2014, 2015)	2025
Georgia	SEC	WCWS (2009, 2010, 2016, 2018, 2021)	2025
Georgia Tech	ACC	Super Regionals (2009)	2025
Indiana	Big Ten	WCWS (1983, 1986)	2025
Kansas	Big 12	WCWS (1992)	2015
Louisville	ACC	Regionals (2004, 2005, 2006, 2007, 2008, 2009, 2010, 2011, 2012, 2013, 2014, 2015, 2016, 2019, 2023)	2023
LSU	SEC	WCWS (2001, 2004, 2012, 2015, 2016, 2017)	2025
Marshall	Sun Belt	Regionals (2013, 2017)	2017
Michigan	Big Ten	National Champion (2005)	2025
Mississippi State	SEC	Super Regional (2022)	2025
Oklahoma	SEC	National Champion (2000, 2013, 2016, 2017, 2021, 2022, 2023, 2024)	2025
Oklahoma State	Big 12	WCWS (1982, 1989, 1990, 1993, 1994, 1998, 2011, 2019, 2021, 2022, 2023, 2024)	2025
Ole Miss	SEC	WCWS (2025)	2025
Oregon	Big Ten	WCWS (1989, 2012, 2014, 2015, 2017, 2018, 2025)	2025
South Carolina	SEC	WCWS (1983, 1989, 1997)	2025
Southeastern Louisiana	Southland	Regionals (2024, 2025)	2025
Stanford	ACC	WCWS (2001, 2004, 2023, 2024)	2025
Tennessee	SEC	WCWS Runner-Up (2007, 2013)	2025
Texas A&M	SEC	National Champion (1983, 1987)	2025
Texas State	Sun Belt	Regionals (1999, 2001, 2003, 2009, 2011, 2012, 2016, 2017, 2018, 2021, 2023, 2024)	2024
Texas Tech	Big 12	WCWS Runner-Up (2025)	2025
UCF	Big 12	Super Regionals (2022)	2025
UCLA	Big Ten	National Champion (1982, 1984, 1985, 1988, 1989, 1990, 1992, 1995 (vacated), 1999, 2003, 2004, 2010, 2019)	2025
Virginia	ACC	Regionals (2010, 2024, 2025)	2025
Virginia Tech	ACC	WCWS (2008)	2025
Washington	Big Ten	National Champion (2009)	2025
Wisconsin	Big Ten	Regionals (2001, 2002, 2005, 2013, 2014, 2017, 2018, 2019, 2022)	2022

=== By conference ===
Conference	Total	Schools
SEC	12	Alabama, Arkansas, Florida, Georgia, LSU, Mississippi State, Oklahoma, Ole Miss, South Carolina, Tennessee, Texas, Texas A&M
ACC	8	Clemson, Duke, Florida State, Georgia Tech, Louisville, Stanford, Virginia, Virginia Tech
Big 12	7	Arizona, Arizona State, Baylor, Kansas, Oklahoma State, Texas Tech, UCF
Big Ten	7	Indiana, Michigan, Nebraska, Oregon, UCLA, Washington, Wisconsin
Sun Belt	3	Marshall, South Alabama, Texas State
Southland	2	McNeese, Southeastern Louisiana
American	1	South Florida
ASUN	1	Stetson
America East	1	Binghamton
Atlantic 10	1	Fordham
Big East	1	UConn
Big Sky	1	Idaho State
Big South	1	USC Upstate
Big West	1	Cal State Fullerton
CAA	1	Charleston
CUSA	1	Jacksonville State
Horizon	1	Northern Kentucky
Ivy League	1	Princeton
MAAC	1	Marist
MAC	1	Akron
MEAC	1	Howard
Missouri Valley	1	Belmont
Mountain West	1	Grand Canyon
Northeast	1	Wagner
Ohio Valley	1	Eastern Illinois
Patriot	1	Boston University
SoCon	1	UNC Greensboro
SWAC	1	Florida A&M
Summit	1	South Dakota
WAC	1	California Baptist
West Coast	1	Saint Mary's

== National seeds ==
Sixteen national seeds were announced on the Selection Show, on Sunday, May 10 at 7 p.m. EDT on ESPN. Teams in italics advanced to Super Regionals. Teams in bold advanced to the Women's College World Series.

1. **Alabama**
2. **Texas**
3. Oklahoma
4. **Nebraska**
5. **Arkansas**
6. Florida
7. **Tennessee**
8. **UCLA**

9. Florida State
10. Georgia
11. **Texas Tech**
12. Duke
13. Oklahoma State
14. Oregon
15. Texas A&M
16. LSU

== Regionals and Super Regionals ==
The Regionals took place May 15–17. The Super Regionals took place May 21–24.

=== Tuscaloosa Super Regional ===
Round 1	Round 2
**1**	**Alabama**	**8^{(5)}**
USC Upstate	0
**1**	**Alabama**	**3**
Belmont	0
Southeastern Louisiana	0
**Belmont**	**2**
Tuscaloosa Regional – Rhoads Stadium
**USC Upstate**	**5**
Southeastern Louisiana	4
Belmont	1
**USC Upstate**	**10**
**16**	**LSU**	**8^{(6)}**
Akron	0
**16**	**LSU**	**8^{(6)}**
Virginia Tech	0
**Virginia Tech**	**6**
South Alabama	0
Baton Rouge Regional – Tiger Park
**Akron**	**1**
South Alabama	0
**Virginia Tech**	**7**
Akron	6

Regional Finals
**1**	**Alabama**	**9**	—
USC Upstate	0	—
**16**	**LSU**	**7**	—
Virginia Tech	2	—

Super Regionals
**1**	**Alabama**	**7**	**4**	—
16	LSU	0	1	—

=== Los Angeles Super Regional ===
Round 1	Round 2
**8**	**UCLA**	**12**
California Baptist	11
**8**	**UCLA**	**7**
South Carolina	2
**South Carolina**	**7**
Cal State Fullerton	4
Los Angeles Regional – Easton Stadium
California Baptist	2
**Cal State Fullerton**	**3**
**South Carolina**	**4**
Cal State Fullerton	2
9	Florida State	3
**Stetson**	**8**
Stetson	1
**UCF**	**10^{(5)}**
**UCF**	**2^{(8)}**
Jacksonville State	1
Tallahassee Regional – JoAnne Graf Field
**9**	**Florida State**	**11^{(5)}**
Jacksonville State	0
Stetson	3
**9**	**Florida State**	**11**

Regional Finals
**8**	**UCLA**	**15^{(6)}**	—
South Carolina	1	—
**UCF**	1	**4**
9	Florida State	**2**	2

Super Regionals
**8**	**UCLA**	**9^{(5)}**	**14**	—
UCF	1	4	—

=== Fayetteville Super Regional ===
Round 1	Round 2
**5**	**Arkansas**	**8^{(6)}**
Fordham	0
**5**	**Arkansas**	**9^{(6)}**
South Florida	1
Washington	1
**South Florida**	**3**
Fayetteville Regional – Bogle Park
Fordham	2
**Washington**	**5**
**South Florida**	**6**
Washington	4
**12**	**Duke**	**10^{(5)}**
Howard	1
12	Duke	1
**Arizona**	**10^{(5)}**
**Arizona**	**7**
Marshall	5
Durham Regional – Smith Family Stadium
Howard	2
**Marshall**	**4**
**12**	**Duke**	**11^{(5)}**
Marshall	1

Regional Finals
**5**	**Arkansas**	**10^{(6)}**	—
South Florida	2	—
Arizona	6	4
**12**	**Duke**	**8**	**9**

Super Regionals
**5**	**Arkansas**	**14^{(5)}**	**10^{(5)}**	—
12	Duke	5	2	—

=== Lincoln Super Regional ===
Round 1	Round 2
**4**	**Nebraska**	**4**
South Dakota	1
**4**	**Nebraska**	**2**
Grand Canyon	0
Louisville	1
**Grand Canyon**	**5**
Lincoln Regional – Bowlin Stadium
**South Dakota**	**4**
Louisville	2
**Grand Canyon**	**5^{(8)}**
South Dakota	4
**13**	**Oklahoma State**	**16^{(5)}**
Eastern Illinois	0
**13**	**Oklahoma State**	**7**
Stanford	2
**Stanford**	**8**
Princeton	2
Stillwater Regional – Cowgirl Stadium
Eastern Illinois	1
**Princeton**	**2**
**Stanford**	**13**
Princeton	5

Regional Finals
**4**	**Nebraska**	**1**	—
Grand Canyon	0	—
**13**	**Oklahoma State**	**11**	—
Stanford	5	—

Super Regionals
**4**	**Nebraska**	**8**	**9^{(5)}**	—
13	Oklahoma State	1	1	—

=== Norman Super Regional ===
Round 1	Round 2
**3**	**Oklahoma**	**11^{(5)}**
Binghamton	0
**3**	**Oklahoma**	**9^{(5)}**
Kansas	0
**Kansas**	**1^{(8)}**
Michigan	0
Norman Regional – Love's Field
Binghamton	0
**Michigan**	**6**
Kansas	10
**Michigan**	**12**
**14**	**Oregon**	**5**
Idaho State	1
14	Oregon	0
**Mississippi State**	**4**
**Mississippi State**	**3^{(8)}**
Saint Mary's	2
Eugene Regional – Jane Sanders Stadium
Idaho State	1
**Saint Mary’s**	**3**
14	Oregon	4
**Saint Mary's**	**5**

Regional Finals
**3**	**Oklahoma**	**8**	—
Michigan	1	—
**Mississippi State**	**5**	—
Saint Mary's	0	—

Super Regionals
3	Oklahoma	9	**7**	0
**Mississippi State**	**11**	1	**6**

=== Gainesville Super Regional ===
Round 1	Round 2
**6**	**Florida**	**12^{(5)}**
Florida A&M	0
**6**	**Florida**	**8^{(5)}**
Georgia Tech	0
Texas State	1
**Georgia Tech**	**2**
Gainesville Regional – Katie Seashole Pressly Softball Stadium
Florida A&M	0
**Texas State**	**6**
**Georgia Tech**	**4**
Texas State	1
**11**	**Texas Tech**	**10**
Marist	3
**11**	**Texas Tech**	**10^{(8)}**
Ole Miss	9
**Ole Miss**	**8**
Boston University	6
Lubbock Regional – Tracy Sellers Field
Marist	2
**Boston University**	**10^{(5)}**
**Ole Miss**	**9**
Boston University	4

Regional Finals
**6**	**Florida**	**5**	—
Georgia Tech	2	—
**11**	**Texas Tech**	**14^{(5)}**	—
Ole Miss	2	—

Super Regionals
6	Florida	8	**10**	7
**11**	**Texas Tech**	**10**	2	**16^{(5)}**

=== Austin Super Regional ===
Round 1	Round 2
**2**	**Texas**	**9^{(5)}**
Wagner	1
**2**	**Texas**	**9^{(6)}**
Wisconsin	0
**Wisconsin**	**2^{(9)}**
Baylor	1
Austin Regional – Red and Charline McCombs Field
Wagner	0
**Baylor**	**9^{(5)}**
Wisconsin	2
**Baylor**	**5**
**15**	**Texas A&M**	**17^{(5)}**
UConn	3
15	Texas A&M	3
**Arizona State**	**4**
**Arizona State**	**8^{(5)}**
McNeese	0
College Station Regional – Davis Diamond
**UConn**	**5**
McNeese	1
**15**	**Texas A&M**	**10**
UConn	3

Regional Finals
**2**	**Texas**	**7**	—
Baylor	0	—
**Arizona State**	**9^{(5)}**	—
15	Texas A&M	1	—

Super Regionals
**2**	**Texas**	1	**4**	**5**
Arizona State	**4**	3	0

=== Knoxville Super Regional ===
Round 1	Round 2
**7**	**Tennessee**	**3**
Northern Kentucky	1
**7**	**Tennessee**	**7**
Virginia	5
**Virginia**	**8^{(8)}**
Indiana	7
Knoxville Regional – Sherri Parker Lee Stadium
Northern Kentucky	0
**Indiana**	**8^{(5)}**
**Virginia**	**9**
Indiana	7
**10**	**Georgia**	**5**
Charleston	2
**10**	**Georgia**	**8^{(5)}**
UNC Greensboro	0
Clemson	0
**UNC Greensboro**	**1**
Athens Regional – Jack Turner Stadium
Charleston	1
**Clemson**	**3**
UNC Greensboro	1
**Clemson**	**4**

Regional Finals
**7**	**Tennessee**	**5**	—
Virginia	1	—
**10**	**Georgia**	**5**	—
Clemson	0	—

Super Regionals
**7**	**Tennessee**	**3**	**2**	—
10	Georgia	1	1	—

== Women's College World Series ==
The Women's College World Series was held May 28 through June 4 in Oklahoma City.

=== Participants ===
School	Conference	Record (conference)	Head coach	WCWS appearances† (including 2026 WCWS)	WCWS best finish†*	WCWS W–L record† (excluding 2026 WCWS)
Alabama	SEC	54–7 (19–5)	Patrick Murphy	16 (last: 2024)	1st (2012)	23–29
Arkansas	SEC	47–11 (15–9)	Courtney Deifel	1 (last: First appearance)	First appearance	0–0
Mississippi State	SEC	43–19 (9–15)	Samantha Ricketts	1 (last: First appearance)	First appearance	0–0
Nebraska	Big Ten	51–6 (23–1)	Rhonda Revelle	8 (last: 2013)	2nd (1985)	11–15
Tennessee	SEC	47–10 (16–8)	Karen Weekly	10 (last: 2025)	2nd (2007, 2013)	19–18
Texas	SEC	47–11 (16–8)	Mike White	9 (last: 2025)	1st (2025)	19–16
Texas Tech	Big 12	56–7 (21–3)	Gerry Glasco	2 (last: 2025)	2nd (2025)	4–2
UCLA	Big Ten	52–8 (20–4)	Kelly Inouye-Perez	34 (last: 2025)	1st (1982, 1984, 1985, 1988, 1989, 1990, 1992, 1999, 2003, 2004, 2010, 2019)	109–44

=== Bracket ===
First round
**11**	**Texas Tech**	**8^{(5)}**
Mississippi State	0
2	Texas	3
**7**	**Tennessee**	**6**
Mississippi State	0
**2**	**Texas**	**4**
**1**	**Alabama**	**6**
8	UCLA	3
**4**	**Nebraska**	**5^{(10)}**
5	Arkansas	3
**8**	**UCLA**	**11^{(5)}**
5	Arkansas	0

Second round
11	Texas Tech	1
**7**	**Tennessee**	**2^{(9)}**
4	Nebraska	1
**2**	**Texas**	**3**
**1**	**Alabama**	**5**
4	Nebraska	1
**11**	**Texas Tech**	**8^{(9)}**
8	UCLA	7

Semifinals
7	Tennessee	2	0
**2**	**Texas**	**5**	**4**
1	Alabama	4	0
**11**	**Texas Tech**	**5**	**2**

Finals
**2**	**Texas**	**7**	**4**	—
11	Texas Tech	3	1	—

=== Game results ===
Date	Game	Winning team	Score	Losing team	Winning pitcher	Losing pitcher	Save	Notes
May 28	Game 1	Texas Tech	8–0 ^{(5)}	Mississippi State	NiJaree Canady (26–6)	Alyssa Faircloth (16–8)	–	Box score
May 28	Game 2	Tennessee	6–3	Texas	Sage Mardjetko (15–2)	Teagan Kavan (25–6)	Karlyn Pickens (7)	Box score
May 28	Game 3	Alabama	6–3	UCLA	Jocelyn Briski (24–3)	Taylor Tinsley (32–7)	–	Box score
May 28	Game 4	Nebraska	5–3 ^{(10)}	Arkansas	Jordy Frahm (21–4)	Robyn Herron (16–7)	–	Box score
May 29	Game 5	Texas	4–0	Mississippi State	Teagan Kavan (26–6)	Delainey Everett (3–2)	–	Mississippi State eliminated Box score
May 29	Game 6	UCLA	11–0 ^{(5)}	Arkansas	Taylor Tinsley (33–7)	Payton Burnham (14–4)	–	Arkansas eliminated Box score
May 30	Game 7	Tennessee	2–1 ^{(9)}	Texas Tech	Sage Mardjetko (16–2)	Kaitlyn Terry (24–2)	–	Box score
May 30	Game 8	Alabama	5–1	Nebraska	Jocelyn Briski (25–3)	Jordy Frahm (21–5)	–	Box score
May 31	Game 9	Texas	3–1	Nebraska	Teagan Kavan (27–6)	Jordy Frahm (21–6)	–	Nebraska eliminated Box score
May 31	Game 10	Texas Tech	8–7 ^{(9)}	UCLA	NiJaree Canady (27–6)	Taylor Tinsley (33–8)	–	UCLA eliminated Box score
June 1	Game 11	Texas	5–2	Tennessee	Citlaly Gutierrez (10–3)	Sage Mardjetko (16–3)	–	Box score
June 1	Game 12	Texas	4–0	Tennessee	Teagan Kavan (28–6)	Karlyn Pickens (15–8)	–	Tennessee eliminated Box score
June 1	Game 13	Texas Tech	5–4	Alabama	NiJaree Canady (28–6)	Vic Moten (21–5)	–	Box score
June 1	Game 14	Texas Tech	2–0	Alabama	NiJaree Canady (29–6)	Jocelyn Briski (25–4)	–	Alabama eliminated Box score
Finals
June 3	Game 1	Texas	7–3	Texas Tech	Teagan Kavan (29–6)	Kaitlyn Terry (24–3)	–	Texas 1–0
June 4	Game 2	Texas	4–1	Texas Tech	Citlaly Gutierrez (11–3)	NiJaree Canady (29–7)	Teagan Kavan (5)	Texas wins WCWS

=== Finals ===
==== Game 1 ====
June 3, 2026 – 7:00 p.m. (CDT) at Devon Park in Oklahoma City, Oklahoma
Team	1	2	3	4	5	6	7	R	H	E
Texas Tech	1	0	0	0	2	0	0	**3**	**3**	**0**
**Texas**	5	0	0	1	0	1	x	**7**	**10**	**0**
WP: Teagan Kavan (29–6) LP: Kaitlyn Terry (24–3); Home runs: TTU: Mi Williams, Mihyia Davis; TEX: Katie Stewart; Attendance: 12,149; Boxscore

==== Game 2 ====
June 4, 2026 – 7:00 p.m. (CDT) at Devon Park in Oklahoma City, Oklahoma
Team	1	2	3	4	5	6	7	R	H	E
**Texas**	0	0	0	0	2	0	2	**4**	**8**	**0**
Texas Tech	0	0	1	0	0	0	0	**1**	**4**	**1**
WP: Citlaly Gutierrez (11–3) LP: NiJaree Canady (29–7) Sv: Teagan Kavan (5); Home runs: TEX: Kayden Henry; TTU: None; Attendance: 12,308; Boxscore

=== All-tournament Team ===
The following players were members of the Women's College World Series All-Tournament Team.

Position	Player	School
P	Jocelyn Briski	Alabama
P	NiJaree Canady	Texas Tech
P	Jordy Frahm	Nebraska
P	**Teagan Kavan (MOP)**	Texas
P	Taylor Tinsley	UCLA
INF	Marlie Giles	Alabama
INF	Katie Stewart	Texas
INF	Mia Williams	Texas Tech
INF	Jordan Woolery	UCLA
INF	Jena Young	Alabama
OF	Mihyia Davis	Texas Tech
UTL	Kaitlyn Terry	Texas Tech

== Record by conference ==
Conference	# of Bids	Record	Win %	RF	SR	WS	NS	F	NC
SEC	12	54–25	.684	12	9	5	3	1	1
Big 12	7	23–18	.561	6	4	1	1	1	–
Big Ten	7	17–14	.548	3	2	2	–	–	–
ACC	8	16–18	.471	7	1	–	–	–	–
American	1	2–2	.500	1	–	–	–	–	–
Big South	1	2–2	.500	1	–	–	–	–	–
Mountain West	1	2–2	.500	1	–	–	–	–	–
West Coast	1	2–2	.500	1	–	–	–	–	–
ASUN	1	1–2	.333	–	–	–	–	–	–
Big East	1	1–2	.333	–	–	–	–	–	–
Big West	1	1–2	.333	–	–	–	–	–	–
Ivy League	1	1–2	.333	–	–	–	–	–	–
Missouri Valley	1	1–2	.333	–	–	–	–	–	–
Patriot	1	1–2	.333	–	–	–	–	–	–
SoCon	1	1–2	.333	–	–	–	–	–	–
Summit	1	1–2	.333	–	–	–	–	–	–
Sun Belt	3	2–6	.250	–	–	–	–	–	–
Southland	2	0–4	.000	–	–	–	–	–	–
America East	1	0–2	.000	–	–	–	–	–	–
Atlantic 10	1	0–2	.000	–	–	–	–	–	–
Big Sky	1	0–2	.000	–	–	–	–	–	–
CAA	1	0–2	.000	–	–	–	–	–	–
Conference USA	1	0–2	.000	–	–	–	–	–	–
Horizon	1	0–2	.000	–	–	–	–	–	–
MAAC	1	0–2	.000	–	–	–	–	–	–
MAC	1	0–2	.000	–	–	–	–	–	–
MEAC	1	0–2	.000	–	–	–	–	–	–
NEC	1	0–2	.000	–	–	–	–	–	–
Ohio Valley	1	0–2	.000	–	–	–	–	–	–
SWAC	1	0–2	.000	–	–	–	–	–	–
WAC	1	0–2	.000	–	–	–	–	–	–

== Media coverage ==
=== Radio ===
For the sixth consecutive year Westwood One will provide nationwide radio coverage of every game in the Women's College World Series.

=== Television ===
ESPN holds exclusive rights to the tournament. The network will air games across ABC, ESPN, ESPN2, ESPNU, ESPN+, SEC Network and ACC Network. For just the ninth time in the history of the women's softball tournament, ESPN will cover every regional.

==== Broadcast assignments ====
Regionals

- Tuscaloosa: Nate Gatter & Monica Abbott
- Austin: Alex Loeb & Cat Osterman
- Norman: Lowell Galindo & Jennie Ritter
- Lincoln: Beth Mowins, Michele Smith, & Jessica Mendoza
- Fayetteville: Krista Blunk & Aleshia Ocasio
- Gainesville: Kevin Fitzgerald & Nicole Mendes
- Knoxville: Matt Schumacker & Amanda Scarborough
- Los Angeles: Courtney Lyle & Danielle Lawrie

Super Regionals

- Tuscaloosa: Eric Frede & Madison Shipman
- Austin: Kevin Brown, Amanda Scarborough, and Alyssa Lang
- Norman: Tiffany Greene & Erin Miller Thiessen
- Lincoln: Chuckie Kempf & Jenny Dalton-Hill

Women's College World Series

- Beth Mowins, Jessica Mendoza, Michele Smith & Holly Rowe (day games)
- Kevin Brown, Amanda Scarborough & Alyssa Lang (afternoons & night games)

Regionals

- Tallahassee: Clay Matvick & Raine Wilson
- Athens: Mark Neely & Carol Bruggeman
- Lubbock: Tiffany Greene & Erin Miller Thiessen
- Durham: Chuckie Kempf & Jenny Dalton-Hill
- Stillwater: Trey Bender & Natasha Watley
- Eugene: Mike Couzens & Kenzie Fowler
- College Station: Eric Frede & Madison Shipman
- Baton Rouge: Alex Perlman & Brittany McKinney

Super Regionals

- Fayetteville: Mark Neely and Carol Bruggeman
- Gainesville: Beth Mowins, Michele Smith, Jessica Mendoza, and Holly Rowe
- Knoxville: Courtney Lyle and Danielle Lawrie
- Los Angeles: Matt Schumacker and Kenzie Fowler

Women's College World Series Finals

- Beth Mowins, Jessica Mendoza, Michele Smith & Holly Rowe
