= 2026 NCAA Division I softball season =

College softball in the United States

- Duration: February 5 – June 4, 2026
- Number of teams: 309
- Defending Champions: Texas
- TV partner/s: ESPN & ESPN+

NCAA Tournament

Women's College World Series
- Champions: Texas (2nd title)
- Runners-up: Texas Tech (2nd WCWS Appearance)
- Winning Coach: Mike White (2nd title)
- WCWS MOP: Teagan Kavan (Texas)

Seasons
- ← 2025 2027 →

The 2026 NCAA Division I Softball season, play of college softball in the United States organized by the National Collegiate Athletic Association (NCAA) at the Division I level, began in February 2026. The season progressed through the regular season, many conference tournaments and championship series, and concluded with the 2026 NCAA Division I softball tournament and 2026 Women's College World Series. The Women's College World Series, consisting of the eight remaining teams in the NCAA Tournament and held annually in Oklahoma City at Devon Park, ended in June 2026.

== Realignment ==
One school transitioned from NCAA Division II to Division I after the 2025 season.

- New Haven in the Division II Northeast-10 Conference. The school started a transition to Division I in July 2025 as a new member of the Northeast Conference.

A total of five softball-sponsoring schools changed conferences after the 2025 season.

- Delaware and Missouri State joined Conference USA.
- Grand Canyon joined the Mountain West Conference.
- Seattle joined the West Coast Conference.
- UMass joined the Mid-American Conference.

Two schools dropped their programs.

- Horizon League members Purdue Fort Wayne and Cleveland State dropped softball after the 2025 season.

The 2026 season was the last for 21 schools in their then-current softball conferences. This does not include the three softball-sponsoring schools of the Western Athletic Conference that remained members when that conference rebranded as the United Athletic Conference in July 2026.

School	2026 conference	Future conference
Austin Peay	Atlantic Sun	United Athletic
California Baptist	Western Athletic	Big West
Central Arkansas	Atlantic Sun	United Athletic
Colorado State	Mountain West	Pac-12
Eastern Kentucky	Atlantic Sun	United Athletic
Fresno State	Mountain West	Pac-12
Hawaii	Big West	Mountain West
North Alabama	Atlantic Sun	United Athletic
Northern Illinois	MAC	Horizon
Oregon State	West Coast	Pac-12
Sacramento State	Big Sky	Big West
Saint Francis	NEC	Presidents' (D-III)
San Diego State	Mountain West	Pac-12
Southern Utah	Western Athletic	Big Sky
Tennessee Tech	Ohio Valley	Southern
Texas State	Sun Belt	Pac-12
UC Davis	Big West	Mountain West
Utah Tech	Western Athletic	Big Sky
Utah Valley	Western Athletic	Big West
UTEP	Conference USA	Mountain West
West Georgia	Atlantic Sun	United Athletic

== Other headlines ==
- May 9, 2026 – During the Big Ten tournament championship game, UCLA's Megan Grant hit her 38th homer of the season, giving her sole possession of the Division I single-season record.

== Conference standings ==
2026 America East Conference softball standings
	Conf.						Overall
Team	W		L		T	PCT	W		L		T	PCT
Bryant ‍†‍‍	16	–	4	–	0	.800	21	–	23	–	0	.477
Binghamton ‍‍‡‍^{y}	15	–	5	–	0	.750	20	–	27	–	0	.426
Albany ‍‍‍	13	–	7	–	0	.650	25	–	20	–	0	.556
UMass Lowell ‍‍‍	11	–	10	–	0	.524	27	–	27	–	0	.500
Maine ‍‍‍	6	–	14	–	0	.300	13	–	36	–	0	.265
UMBC ‍‍‍	0	–	21	–	0	.000	11	–	9	–	0	.550
† – Conference champion ‡ – Tournament champion y – Invited to the NCAA tournament As of May 17, 2026; Rankings from NFCA/USA Today

2026 American Conference softball standings
	Conf.				Overall
Team	W		L	PCT	W		L	PCT
South Florida ‍†‍‡‍^{y}	21	–	6	.778	44	–	17	.721
Wichita State ‍†‍‍	21	–	6	.778	35	–	17	.673
East Carolina ‍‍‍	16	–	11	.593	34	–	25	.576
Florida Atlantic ‍‍‍	14	–	13	.519	34	–	20	.630
Charlotte ‍‍‍	14	–	13	.519	31	–	26	.544
North Texas ‍‍‍	14	–	13	.519	28	–	28	.500
UTSA ‍‍‍	11	–	16	.407	24	–	33	.421
Tulsa ‍‍‍	10	–	17	.370	20	–	32	.385
UAB ‍‍‍	8	–	19	.296	21	–	33	.389
Memphis ‍‍‍	6	–	21	.222	18	–	39	.316
† – Conference champion ‡ – Tournament champion y – Invited to the NCAA tournament As of May 17, 2026; Rankings from NFCA/USA Today

2026 ASUN Conference softball standings
	Conf.						Overall
Team	W		L		T	PCT	W		L		T	PCT
Gold
Central Arkansas ^{x}‍‍‍	16	–	6	–	1	.717	36	–	20	–	1	.640
North Alabama ‍‍‍	17	–	7	–	0	.708	36	–	16	–	0	.692
Eastern Kentucky ‍‍‍	14	–	8	–	1	.630	27	–	25	–	1	.519
Austin Peay ‍‍‍	12	–	12	–	0	.500	30	–	24	–	0	.556
Lipscomb ‍‍‍	6	–	18	–	0	.250	13	–	38	–	0	.255
Bellarmine ‍‍‍	5	–	19	–	0	.208	12	–	38	–	0	.240
Graphite
Stetson ^{x}‍‍‡‍^{y}	18	–	6	–	0	.750	37	–	22	–	0	.627
Jacksonville ‍‍‍	16	–	8	–	0	.667	34	–	21	–	0	.618
Florida Gulf Coast ‍‍‍	14	–	10	–	0	.583	21	–	33	–	0	.389
North Florida ‍‍‍	11	–	13	–	0	.458	39	–	22	–	0	.639
West Georgia* ‍‍‍	8	–	16	–	0	.333	16	–	39	–	0	.291
Queens (NC) ‍‍‍	5	–	19	–	0	.208	13	–	34	–	0	.277
* ineligible for the 2026 NCAA tournament due to transition from Division II
x – Division champion ‡ – Tournament champion y – Invited to the NCAA tournament As of May 17, 2026; Rankings from NFCA/USA Today

2026 Atlantic 10 Conference softball standings
	Conf.				Overall
Team	W		L	PCT	W		L	PCT
Loyola Chicago ‍†‍‍	18	–	6	.750	28	–	24	.538
Saint Louis ‍‍‍	13	–	10	.565	23	–	28	.451
Dayton ‍‍‍	13	–	11	.542	26	–	24	.520
Fordham ‍‍‡‍^{y}	13	–	11	.542	27	–	28	.491
Saint Joseph's ‍‍‍	13	–	11	.542	27	–	26	.509
George Washington ‍‍‍	12	–	12	.500	23	–	22	.511
George Mason ‍‍‍	10	–	14	.417	26	–	25	.510
Rhode Island ‍‍‍	9	–	15	.375	21	–	26	.447
St. Bonaventure ‍‍‍	6	–	17	.261	9	–	44	.170
† – Conference champion ‡ – Tournament champion y – Invited to the NCAA tournament As of May 17, 2026; Rankings from NFCA/USA Today

2026 Atlantic Coast Conference softball standings
	Conf.				Overall
Team	W		L	PCT	W		L	PCT
No. 7 Florida State ‍†‍‡‍^{y}	21	–	3	.875	58	–	11	.841
No. 13 Duke ‍‍‍^{y}	20	–	4	.833	44	–	17	.721
No. 11 Virginia Tech ‍‍‍^{y}	18	–	6	.750	48	–	12	.800
No. 25 Louisville ‍‍‍^{y}	18	–	6	.750	45	–	14	.763
No. 14 Stanford ‍‍‍^{y}	18	–	6	.750	39	–	15	.722
No. 24 Virginia ‍‍‍^{y}	13	–	10	.565	40	–	14	.741
Clemson ‍‍‍^{y}	13	–	11	.542	34	–	22	.607
Notre Dame ‍‍‍	11	–	13	.458	25	–	28	.472
Georgia Tech ‍‍‍^{y}	10	–	14	.417	32	–	29	.525
North Carolina ‍‍‍	9	–	15	.375	32	–	19	.627
Pittsburgh ‍‍‍	8	–	16	.333	25	–	27	.481
NC State ‍‍‍	7	–	16	.304	27	–	26	.509
California ‍‍‍	5	–	19	.208	15	–	37	.288
Syracuse ‍‍‍	4	–	18	.182	18	–	26	.409
Boston College ‍‍‍	3	–	21	.125	13	–	38	.255
† – Conference champion ‡ – Tournament champion y – Invited to the NCAA Tournament; As of May 24, 2026; Rankings from NFCA/USA Today

2026 Big 12 Conference softball standings
	Conf.						Overall
Team	W		L		T	PCT	W		L		T	PCT
No. 4 Texas Tech ‍†‍‍^{y}	21	–	3	–	0	.875	61	–	10	–	0	.859
No. 15 Oklahoma State ‍‍‍^{y}	16	–	8	–	0	.667	41	–	17	–	0	.707
No. 22 Arizona ‍‍‍^{y}	16	–	8	–	0	.667	37	–	18	–	0	.673
No. 23 UCF ‍‍‍^{y}	14	–	9	–	1	.604	41	–	19	–	1	.680
Kansas ‍‍‍^{y}	14	–	10	–	0	.583	36	–	21	–	0	.632
No. 19 Arizona State ‍‍‡‍^{y}	11	–	13	–	0	.458	45	–	18	–	0	.714
Utah ‍‍‍	10	–	13	–	1	.438	35	–	20	–	1	.634
Baylor ‍‍‍^{y}	10	–	14	–	0	.417	30	–	28	–	0	.517
Iowa State ‍‍‍	9	–	15	–	0	.375	32	–	23	–	0	.582
BYU ‍‍‍	7	–	17	–	0	.292	18	–	33	–	0	.353
Houston ‍‍‍	3	–	21	–	0	.125	20	–	31	–	0	.392
† – Conference champion ‡ – Tournament champion y – Invited to the NCAA Tournament; As of June 4, 2026; Rankings from NFCA/USA Today

2026 Big East Conference softball standings
	Conf.				Overall
Team	W		L	PCT	W		L	PCT
Providence ‍†‍‍	18	–	6	.750	29	–	20	.592
UConn ‍†‍‡‍^{y}	18	–	6	.750	32	–	27	.542
Creighton ‍‍‍	17	–	7	.708	32	–	27	.542
Butler ‍‍‍	15	–	9	.625	25	–	21	.543
St. John's ‍‍‍	9	–	15	.375	32	–	23	.582
Georgetown ‍‍‍	9	–	15	.375	16	–	26	.381
DePaul ‍‍‍	8	–	16	.333	20	–	30	.400
Villanova ‍‍‍	8	–	16	.333	14	–	39	.264
Seton Hall ‍‍‍	6	–	18	.250	19	–	30	.388
† – Conference champion ‡ – Tournament champion y – Invited to the NCAA Tournament; As of May 17, 2026; Rankings from NFCA/USA Today

2026 Big Sky Conference softball standings
	Conf.				Overall
Team	W		L	PCT	W		L	PCT
Idaho State ‍†‍‡‍^{y}	10	–	5	.667	37	–	20	.649
Northern Colorado ‍‍‍	9	–	6	.600	24	–	27	.471
Sacramento State ‍‍‍	9	–	6	.600	33	–	20	.623
Montana ‍‍‍	9	–	6	.600	22	–	32	.407
Portland State ‍‍‍	4	–	11	.267	14	–	32	.304
Weber State ‍‍‍	4	–	11	.267	14	–	42	.250
† – Conference champion ‡ – Tournament champion y – Invited to the NCAA tournament As of May 17, 2026; Rankings from NFCA/USA Today

2026 Big South Conference softball standings
	Conf.				Overall
Team	W		L	PCT	W		L	PCT
Winthrop ‍†‍‍	13	–	4	.765	30	–	23	.566
USC Upstate ‍‍‡‍^{y}	12	–	6	.667	38	–	23	.623
Radford ‍‍‍	10	–	8	.556	24	–	27	.471
Presbyterian ‍‍‍	8	–	10	.444	20	–	32	.385
Gardner-Webb ‍‍‍	8	–	10	.444	32	–	25	.561
Longwood ‍‍‍	7	–	10	.412	21	–	32	.396
Charleston Southern ‍‍‍	4	–	14	.222	10	–	41	.196
† – Conference champion ‡ – Tournament champion y – Invited to the NCAA tournament As of May 17, 2026; Rankings from NFCA/USA Today

2026 Big Ten Conference softball standings
	Conf.				Overall
Team	W		L	PCT	W		L	PCT
No. 1 Nebraska ‍†‍‡‍^{y}	23	–	1	.958	52	–	8	.867
No. 12 Oregon ‍‍‍^{y}	20	–	4	.833	41	–	14	.745
No. 5 UCLA ‍‍‍^{y}	20	–	4	.833	53	–	10	.841
Indiana ‍‍‍^{y}	17	–	7	.708	43	–	16	.729
Northwestern ‍‍‍	16	–	8	.667	29	–	21	.580
Washington ‍‍‍^{y}	16	–	8	.667	37	–	20	.649
Wisconsin ‍‍‍^{y}	14	–	10	.583	33	–	21	.611
Ohio State ‍‍‍	13	–	11	.542	26	–	27	.491
Michigan ‍‍‍^{y}	11	–	13	.458	36	–	22	.621
Penn State ‍‍‍	11	–	13	.458	33	–	21	.611
Purdue ‍‍‍	11	–	13	.458	34	–	20	.630
Iowa ‍‍‍	7	–	17	.292	27	–	27	.500
Minnesota ‍‍‍	7	–	17	.292	16	–	36	.308
Rutgers ‍‍‍	6	–	18	.250	27	–	27	.500
Maryland ‍‍‍	5	–	19	.208	19	–	29	.396
Michigan State ‍‍‍	3	–	20	.130	17	–	34	.333
Illinois ‍‍‍	3	–	20	.130	15	–	39	.278
† – Conference champion ‡ – Tournament champion y – Invited to the NCAA Tournament; As of May 31, 2026; Rankings from NFCA/USA Today

2026 Big West Conference softball standings
	Conf.				Overall
Team	W		L	PCT	W		L	PCT
Cal State Fullerton ‍†‍‡‍^{y}	24	–	3	.889	41	–	15	.732
Hawaii ‍‍‍	21	–	6	.778	30	–	20	.600
UC Santa Barbara ‍‍‍	18	–	9	.667	31	–	26	.544
UC Davis ‍‍‍	17	–	10	.630	29	–	25	.537
Long Beach State ‍‍‍	17	–	10	.630	31	–	23	.574
UC San Diego ‍‍‍	12	–	15	.444	23	–	28	.451
Cal State Northridge ‍‍‍	9	–	18	.333	14	–	32	.304
Cal State Bakersfield ‍‍‍	8	–	19	.296	10	–	40	.200
Cal Poly ‍‍‍	5	–	22	.185	11	–	35	.239
UC Riverside ‍‍‍	4	–	23	.148	6	–	38	.136
† – Conference champion ‡ – Tournament champion y – Invited to the NCAA tournament As of May 17, 2026; Rankings from NFCA/USA Today

2026 Coastal Athletic Association softball standings
	Conf.				Overall
Team	W		L	PCT	W		L	PCT
North
Hofstra ^{x}‍‍‍	21	–	3	.875	31	–	23	.574
Stony Brook ‍‍‍	11	–	13	.458	21	–	29	.420
Drexel ‍‍‍	11	–	13	.458	22	–	23	.489
Monmouth ‍‍‍	10	–	14	.417	20	–	31	.392
Towson ‍‍‍	8	–	16	.333	25	–	26	.490
South
UNC Wilmington ^{x}‍‍‍	18	–	6	.750	32	–	19	.627
Campbell ^{x}‍‍‍	18	–	6	.750	34	–	23	.596
Charleston ‍‍‡‍^{y}	14	–	10	.583	30	–	30	.500
Elon ‍‍‍	12	–	12	.500	18	–	33	.353
North Carolina A&T ‍‍‍	5	–	19	.208	20	–	33	.377
Hampton ‍‍‍	4	–	20	.167	10	–	33	.233
x – Division champion ‡ – Tournament champion y – Invited to the NCAA tournament As of May 17, 2026; Rankings from NFCA/USA Today

2026 Conference USA softball standings
	Conf.				Overall
Team	W		L	PCT	W		L	PCT
Jacksonville State ‍†‍‡‍^{y}	24	–	3	.889	45	–	16	.738
Western Kentucky ‍‍‍	19	–	8	.704	39	–	14	.736
Liberty ‍‍‍	18	–	9	.667	29	–	28	.509
Delaware ‍‍‍	17	–	10	.630	31	–	24	.564
FIU ‍‍‍	16	–	11	.593	34	–	18	.654
New Mexico State ‍‍‍	16	–	11	.593	27	–	27	.500
Louisiana Tech ‍‍‍	15	–	12	.556	31	–	25	.554
Sam Houston ‍‍‍	13	–	14	.481	29	–	27	.518
Missouri State ‍‍‍	10	–	17	.370	22	–	28	.440
Middle Tennessee ‍‍‍	7	–	20	.259	21	–	30	.412
UTEP ‍‍‍	4	–	23	.148	12	–	37	.245
Kennesaw State ‍‍‍	3	–	24	.111	7	–	43	.140
† – Conference champion ‡ – Tournament champion y – Invited to the NCAA tournament As of May 17, 2026; Rankings from NFCA/USA Today

2026 Horizon League softball standings
	Conf.				Overall
Team	W		L	PCT	W		L	PCT
Youngstown State ‍†‍‍	14	–	4	.778	31	–	20	.608
Northern Kentucky ‍‍‡‍^{y}	11	–	7	.611	26	–	25	.510
Robert Morris ‍‍‍	11	–	7	.611	31	–	18	.633
Oakland ‍‍‍	9	–	9	.500	25	–	24	.510
Green Bay ‍‍‍	8	–	10	.444	16	–	31	.340
Detroit Mercy ‍‍‍	6	–	12	.333	15	–	32	.319
IUPUI ‍‍‍	4	–	14	.222	7	–	40	.149
† – Conference champion ‡ – Tournament champion y – Invited to the NCAA tournament As of May 17, 2026; Rankings from NFCA/USA Today

2026 Ivy League softball standings
	Conf.						Overall
Team	W		L		T	PCT	W		L		T	PCT
Princeton ‍†‍‡‍^{y}	18	–	3	–	0	.857	34	–	15	–	0	.694
Columbia ‍‍‍	12	–	9	–	0	.571	22	–	23	–	0	.489
Harvard ‍‍‍	12	–	9	–	0	.571	21	–	23	–	1	.478
Brown ‍‍‍	11	–	9	–	0	.550	21	–	23	–	0	.477
Cornell ‍‍‍	8	–	13	–	0	.381	21	–	22	–	0	.488
Penn ‍‍‍	8	–	13	–	0	.381	17	–	27	–	0	.386
Dartmouth ‍‍‍	7	–	13	–	0	.350	9	–	23	–	0	.281
Yale ‍‍‍	7	–	14	–	0	.333	17	–	28	–	0	.378
† – Conference champion ‡ – Tournament champion y – Invited to the NCAA tournament As of May 17, 2026; Rankings from NFCA/USA Today

2026 Metro Atlantic Athletic Conference softball standings
	Conf.				Overall
Team	W		L	PCT	W		L	PCT
Marist ‍†‍‡‍^{y}	24	–	3	.889	37	–	21	.638
Fairfield ‍‍‍	19	–	7	.731	27	–	24	.529
Iona ‍‍‍	18	–	10	.643	27	–	26	.509
Sacred Heart ‍‍‍	16	–	11	.593	23	–	31	.426
Quinnipiac ‍‍‍	16	–	12	.571	24	–	21	.533
Siena ‍‍‍	15	–	12	.556	25	–	22	.532
Mount St. Mary's ‍‍‍	15	–	12	.556	20	–	28	.417
Rider ‍‍‍	14	–	13	.519	25	–	24	.510
Canisius ‍‍‍	11	–	15	.423	17	–	27	.386
Merrimack ‍‍‍	10	–	16	.385	12	–	29	.293
Manhattan ‍‍‍	10	–	18	.357	15	–	37	.288
Niagara ‍‍‍	5	–	22	.185	8	–	34	.190
Saint Peter's ‍‍‍	3	–	25	.107	7	–	44	.137
† – Conference champion ‡ – Tournament champion y – Invited to the NCAA tournament As of May 17, 2026; Rankings from NFCA/USA Today

2026 Mid-American Conference softball standings
	Conf.				Overall
Team	W		L	PCT	W		L	PCT
Akron ‍†‍‡‍^{y}	21	–	6	.778	35	–	25	.583
Northern Illinois ‍‍‍	18	–	7	.720	25	–	18	.581
Miami (OH) ‍‍‍	19	–	8	.704	38	–	18	.679
Ohio ‍‍‍	17	–	10	.630	38	–	20	.655
Central Michigan ‍‍‍	15	–	11	.577	25	–	24	.510
Western Michigan ‍‍‍	15	–	12	.556	29	–	26	.527
Toledo ‍‍‍	11	–	16	.407	15	–	35	.300
Ball State ‍‍‍	10	–	17	.370	23	–	25	.479
Buffalo ‍‍‍	10	–	17	.370	24	–	32	.429
UMass ‍‍‍	10	–	17	.370	19	–	30	.388
Kent State ‍‍‍	8	–	19	.296	20	–	30	.400
Bowling Green ‍‍‍	6	–	20	.231	20	–	29	.408
† – Conference champion ‡ – Tournament champion y – Invited to the NCAA tournament As of May 17, 2026; Rankings from NFCA/USA Today

2026 Mid-Eastern Athletic Conference softball standings
	Conf.				Overall
Team	W		L	PCT	W		L	PCT
Howard ‍†‍‡‍^{y}	18	–	3	.857	29	–	19	.604
Delaware State ‍‍‍	15	–	6	.714	28	–	17	.622
South Carolina State ‍‍‍	12	–	9	.571	22	–	19	.537
Norfolk State ‍‍‍	12	–	9	.571	22	–	21	.512
Morgan State ‍‍‍	9	–	12	.429	15	–	28	.349
Coppin State ‍‍‍	7	–	14	.333	9	–	27	.250
North Carolina Central ‍‍‍	6	–	15	.286	8	–	40	.167
Maryland Eastern Shore ‍‍‍	5	–	16	.238	15	–	33	.313
† – Conference champion ‡ – Tournament champion y – Invited to the NCAA tournament As of May 17, 2026; Rankings from NFCA/USA Today

2026 Missouri Valley Conference softball standings
	Conf.						Overall
Team	W		L		T	PCT	W		L		T	PCT
Belmont ‍†‍‡‍^{y}	21	–	5	–	0	.808	41	–	13	–	0	.759
Southern Illinois ‍‍‍	21	–	6	–	0	.778	34	–	17	–	0	.667
Murray State ‍‍‍	17	–	9	–	0	.654	29	–	23	–	0	.558
Northern Iowa ‍‍‍	16	–	10	–	0	.615	28	–	24	–	0	.538
Illinois State ‍‍‍	16	–	13	–	0	.552	28	–	22	–	0	.560
Evansville ‍‍‍	12	–	15	–	0	.444	21	–	29	–	0	.420
Indiana State ‍‍‍	10	–	15	–	0	.400	22	–	28	–	0	.440
Valparaiso ‍‍‍	10	–	17	–	0	.370	20	–	30	–	0	.400
UIC ‍‍‍	10	–	18	–	0	.357	20	–	32	–	1	.387
Bradley ‍‍‍	8	–	20	–	0	.286	16	–	37	–	0	.302
Drake ‍‍‍	7	–	21	–	0	.250	12	–	36	–	0	.250
† – Conference champion ‡ – Tournament champion y – Invited to the NCAA tournament As of May 17, 2026; Rankings from NFCA/USA Today

2026 Mountain West Conference softball standings
	Conf.				Overall
Team	W		L	PCT	W		L	PCT
No. 21 Grand Canyon ‍†‍‡‍^{y}	21	–	4	.840	54	–	10	.844
UNLV ‍‍‍	18	–	7	.720	31	–	22	.585
Nevada ‍‍‍	16	–	9	.640	39	–	20	.661
New Mexico ‍‍‍	13	–	12	.520	28	–	27	.509
Fresno State ‍‍‍	12	–	13	.480	23	–	24	.489
Boise State ‍‍‍	11	–	14	.440	25	–	30	.455
Colorado State ‍‍‍	11	–	14	.440	23	–	28	.451
San Diego State ‍‍‍	9	–	16	.360	24	–	26	.480
Utah State ‍‍‍	7	–	18	.280	19	–	35	.352
San Jose State ‍‍‍	7	–	18	.280	15	–	33	.313
† – Conference champion ‡ – Tournament champion y – Invited to the NCAA tournament As of May 17, 2026; Rankings from NFCA/USA Today

2026 Northeast Conference softball standings
	Conf.						Overall
Team	W		L		T	PCT	W		L		T	PCT
LIU ‍†‍‍	21	–	3	–	0	.875	25	–	31	–	0	.446
Central Connecticut ‍‍‍	20	–	4	–	0	.833	27	–	20	–	0	.574
Wagner ‍‍‡‍^{y}	14	–	10	–	0	.583	21	–	27	–	0	.438
Le Moyne* ‍‍‍	12	–	12	–	0	.500	16	–	35	–	0	.314
Fairleigh Dickinson ‍‍‍	11	–	13	–	0	.458	20	–	32	–	0	.385
Stonehill ‍‍‍	9	–	15	–	0	.375	13	–	37	–	0	.260
New Haven* ‍‍‍	8	–	16	–	0	.333	10	–	35	–	0	.222
Mercyhurst* ‍‍‍	8	–	16	–	0	.333	9	–	34	–	0	.209
Saint Francis (PA) ‍‍‍	5	–	19	–	0	.208	5	–	42	–	1	.115
* ineligible for the 2025 NCAA tournament due to transition from Division II
† – Conference champion ‡ – Tournament champion y – Invited to the NCAA tournament As of May 17, 2026; Rankings from NFCA/USA Today

2026 Ohio Valley Conference softball standings
	Conf.				Overall
Team	W		L	PCT	W		L	PCT
Eastern Illinois ‍†‍‡‍^{y}	23	–	3	.885	36	–	23	.610
UT Martin ‍‍‍	20	–	6	.769	33	–	21	.611
SIU Edwardsville ‍‍‍	18	–	9	.667	29	–	29	.500
Lindenwood ‍‍‍	17	–	10	.630	32	–	24	.571
Southeast Missouri State ‍‍‍	16	–	10	.615	23	–	30	.434
Tennessee Tech ‍‍‍	11	–	16	.407	16	–	34	.320
Southern Indiana ‍‍‍	11	–	16	.407	15	–	32	.319
Western Illinois ‍‍‍	9	–	17	.346	14	–	32	.304
Morehead State ‍‍‍	6	–	21	.222	7	–	38	.156
Tennessee State ‍‍‍	2	–	25	.074	2	–	37	.051
† – Conference champion ‡ – Tournament champion y – Invited to the NCAA tournament As of May 17, 2026; Rankings from NFCA/USA Today

2026 Patriot League softball standings
	Conf.						Overall
Team	W		L		T	PCT	W		L		T	PCT
Boston University ‍†‍‡‍^{y}	16	–	2	–	0	.889	47	–	15	–	0	.758
Colgate ‍‍‍	13	–	5	–	0	.722	29	–	26	–	0	.527
Army ‍‍‍	12	–	6	–	0	.667	33	–	25	–	0	.569
Lafayette ‍‍‍	7	–	11	–	0	.389	16	–	36	–	0	.308
Bucknell ‍‍‍	6	–	12	–	0	.333	9	–	35	–	1	.211
Lehigh ‍‍‍	5	–	13	–	0	.278	26	–	28	–	0	.481
Holy Cross ‍‍‍	4	–	14	–	0	.222	10	–	34	–	0	.227
† – Conference champion ‡ – Tournament champion y – Invited to the NCAA tournament As of May 17, 2026; Rankings from NFCA/USA Today

2026 Southeastern Conference softball standings
	Conf.				Overall
Team	W		L	PCT	W		L	PCT
No. 8 Oklahoma ‍†‍‍^{y}	20	–	4	.833	52	–	10	.839
No. 3 Alabama ‍‍‍^{y}	19	–	5	.792	56	–	9	.862
No. 9 Florida ‍‍‍^{y}	17	–	7	.708	52	–	12	.813
No. 1 Texas ‍‍‡‍^{y}	16	–	8	.667	53	–	12	.815
No. 4 Tennessee ‍‍‍^{y}	16	–	8	.667	49	–	12	.803
No. 20 Texas A&M ‍‍‍^{y}	16	–	8	.667	38	–	19	.667
No. 7 Arkansas ‍‍‍^{y}	15	–	9	.625	47	–	13	.783
No. 18 LSU ‍‍‍^{y}	13	–	11	.542	40	–	19	.678
No. 15 Georgia ‍‍‍^{y}	12	–	12	.500	41	–	20	.672
No. 10 Mississippi State ‍‍‍^{y}	9	–	15	.375	43	–	21	.672
Missouri ‍‍‍	9	–	15	.375	28	–	29	.491
South Carolina ‍‍‍^{y}	7	–	17	.292	32	–	28	.533
Ole Miss ‍‍‍^{y}	6	–	18	.250	36	–	26	.581
Auburn ‍‍‍	4	–	20	.167	27	–	28	.491
Kentucky ‍‍‍	1	–	23	.042	26	–	29	.473
† – Conference champion ‡ – Tournament champion y – Invited to the NCAA tournament As of June 4, 2026; Rankings from NFCA/USA Today

2026 Southern Conference softball standings
	Conf.						Overall
Team	W		L		T	PCT	W		L		T	PCT
UNC Greensboro ‍†‍‡‍^{y}	17	–	4	–	0	.810	43	–	19	–	0	.694
Samford ‍‍‍	14	–	7	–	0	.667	28	–	31	–	0	.475
Western Carolina ‍‍‍	12	–	9	–	0	.571	34	–	24	–	0	.586
Wofford ‍‍‍	10	–	11	–	0	.476	35	–	19	–	0	.648
Chattanooga ‍‍‍	10	–	11	–	0	.476	25	–	29	–	1	.464
East Tennessee State ‍‍‍	8	–	13	–	0	.381	22	–	30	–	0	.423
Mercer ‍‍‍	8	–	13	–	0	.381	20	–	30	–	0	.400
Furman ‍‍‍	5	–	16	–	0	.238	13	–	40	–	0	.245
† – Conference champion ‡ – Tournament champion y – Invited to the NCAA tournament As of May 17, 2026; Rankings from NFCA/USA Today

2026 Southland Conference softball standings
	Conf.				Overall
Team	W		L	PCT	W		L	PCT
Southeastern Louisiana ‍†‍‍^{y}	24	–	3	.889	46	–	16	.742
McNeese State ‍‍‡‍^{y}	18	–	9	.667	40	–	20	.667
Nicholls ‍‍‍	18	–	10	.643	36	–	23	.610
Incarnate Word ‍‍‍	17	–	10	.630	33	–	21	.611
Lamar ‍‍‍	16	–	11	.593	32	–	22	.593
Stephen F. Austin ‍‍‍	13	–	14	.481	31	–	28	.525
Northwestern State ‍‍‍	13	–	14	.481	24	–	29	.453
Texas A&M–Corpus Christi ‍‍‍	8	–	19	.296	14	–	38	.269
Houston Christian ‍‍‍	7	–	19	.269	10	–	36	.217
East Texas A&M ‍‍‍	1	–	25	.038	6	–	45	.118
† – Conference champion ‡ – Tournament champion y – Invited to the NCAA tournament As of May 17, 2026; Rankings from NFCA/USA Today

2026 Southwestern Athletic Conference softball standings
	Conf.				Overall
Team	W		L	PCT	W		L	PCT
East
Florida A&M ^{x}‍‍‡‍^{y}	19	–	5	.792	32	–	22	.593
Jackson State ‍‍‍	16	–	8	.667	25	–	23	.521
Bethune-Cookman ‍‍‍	16	–	8	.667	21	–	28	.429
Alabama State ‍‍‍	15	–	9	.625	23	–	30	.434
Alabama A&M ‍‍‍	6	–	18	.250	19	–	31	.380
Mississippi Valley State ‍‍‍	0	–	24	.000	1	–	38	.026
West
Prairie View A&M ^{x}‍‍‍	19	–	4	.826	27	–	17	.614
Southern ‍‍‍	18	–	6	.750	37	–	15	.712
Texas Southern ‍‍‍	17	–	6	.739	30	–	11	.732
Arkansas-Pine Bluff ‍‍‍	7	–	15	.318	14	–	31	.311
Grambling State ‍‍‍	5	–	18	.217	13	–	28	.317
Alcorn State ‍‍‍	3	–	20	.130	15	–	34	.306
x – Division champion ‡ – Tournament champion y – Invited to the NCAA tournament As of May 17, 2026; Rankings from NFCA/USA Today

2026 Summit League softball standings
	Conf.						Overall
Team	W		L		T	PCT	W		L		T	PCT
Omaha ‍†‍‍	15	–	2	–	0	.882	37	–	12	–	0	.755
St. Thomas ‍‍‍	12	–	5	–	0	.706	34	–	19	–	0	.642
North Dakota State ‍‍‍	11	–	7	–	0	.611	27	–	23	–	0	.540
South Dakota ‍‍‡‍^{y}	7	–	11	–	0	.389	21	–	36	–	1	.371
Kansas City ‍‍‍	6	–	12	–	0	.333	16	–	32	–	0	.333
North Dakota ‍‍‍	5	–	12	–	0	.294	28	–	24	–	0	.538
South Dakota State ‍‍‍	5	–	12	–	0	.294	25	–	34	–	0	.424
† – Conference champion ‡ – Tournament champion y – Invited to the NCAA tournament As of May 17, 2026; Rankings from NFCA/USA Today

2026 Sun Belt Conference softball standings
	Conf.				Overall
Team	W		L	PCT	W		L	PCT
Louisiana–Monroe ‍†‍‍	19	–	5	.792	38	–	20	.655
Marshall ‍‍‍^{y}	17	–	7	.708	38	–	19	.667
Texas State ‍‍‍^{y}	16	–	8	.667	39	–	22	.639
Southern Miss ‍‍‍	14	–	10	.583	33	–	24	.579
South Alabama ‍‍‡‍^{y}	13	–	11	.542	32	–	27	.542
James Madison ‍‍‍	13	–	11	.542	27	–	24	.529
Louisiana ‍‍‍	11	–	13	.458	29	–	27	.518
Georgia Southern ‍‍‍	11	–	13	.458	24	–	29	.453
Troy ‍‍‍	10	–	14	.417	32	–	22	.593
Appalachian State ‍‍‍	8	–	16	.333	29	–	21	.580
Coastal Carolina ‍‍‍	8	–	16	.333	26	–	31	.456
Georgia State ‍‍‍	4	–	20	.167	25	–	31	.446
† – Conference champion ‡ – Tournament champion y – Invited to the NCAA tournament As of May 17, 2026; Rankings from NFCA/USA Today

2026 Western Athletic Conference softball standings
	Conf.				Overall
Team	W		L	PCT	W		L	PCT
California Baptist ‍†‍‡‍^{y}	15	–	3	.833	43	–	19	.694
Tarleton State ‍‍‍	13	–	5	.722	38	–	23	.623
UT Arlington ‍‍‍	12	–	6	.667	24	–	23	.511
Utah Valley ‍‍‍	8	–	10	.444	31	–	23	.574
Southern Utah ‍‍‍	6	–	12	.333	21	–	30	.412
Utah Tech ‍‍‍	5	–	13	.278	19	–	34	.358
Abilene Christian ‍‍‍	4	–	14	.222	7	–	41	.146
† – Conference champion ‡ – Tournament champion y – Invited to the NCAA tournament As of May 17, 2026; Rankings from NFCA/USA Today

2026 West Coast Conference softball standings
	Conf.				Overall
Team	W		L	PCT	W		L	PCT
Saint Mary's ‍†‍‍^{y}	15	–	3	.833	42	–	16	.724
Santa Clara ‍‍‍	11	–	7	.611	26	–	25	.510
Loyola Marymount ‍‍‍	10	–	8	.556	32	–	19	.627
Oregon State ‍‍‍	9	–	9	.500	21	–	32	.396
San Diego ‍‍‍	7	–	11	.389	21	–	30	.412
Pacific ‍‍‍	6	–	12	.333	18	–	34	.346
Seattle ‍‍‍	5	–	13	.278	19	–	32	.373
† – Conference champion y – Invited to the NCAA tournament As of May 17, 2026; Rankings from NFCA/USA Today

=== Conference winners and tournaments ===
Of the 31 Division I athletic conferences that sponsor softball, all but one end their regular seasons with a single-elimination tournament or a double elimination tournament. The teams in each conference that win their regular season title are given the number one seed in each tournament. Only the West Coast Conference does not hold a conference tournament. The winners of these tournaments, plus the West Coast Conference regular-season champions, receive automatic invitations to the 2026 NCAA Division I softball tournament.

Conference	Regular Season Winner	Conference Player of the Year	Conference Pitcher of the Year	Conference Coach of the Year	Conference Tournament	Tournament Venue • City	Tournament Winner
America East Conference	Bryant	Rachel Carey, Binghamton	Maddy Wachter, Bryant	Bianka Bell, Bryant	2026 America East Conference softball tournament	Pierre & Catherine Labat Softball Complex • Orono, ME	Binghamton
American Conference	South Florida (Note: Top seed in conference tournament.) & Wichita State	Kinzey Woody, Wichita State	Anne Long, South Florida	Wichita State	2026 American Conference softball tournament	Max R. Joyner Family Stadium • Greenville, NC	South Florida
Atlantic 10 Conference	Loyola Chicago	Ashley Corpuz, George Washington	Izzy Kemp, Dayton	Alicia Abbott, Loyola Chicago	2026 Atlantic 10 Conference softball tournament	Billiken Sports Center • St. Louis, MO	Fordham
Atlantic Coast Conference	Florida State	Isa Torres, Florida State	Jazzy Francik, Florida State	Lonni Alameda, Florida State	2026 Atlantic Coast Conference softball tournament	Palmer Park • Charlottesville, VA	Florida State
Atlantic Sun Conference	Gold - Central Arkansas; Graphite -Stetson	Nicole Edmiaston, Stetson	Jacy Harrelson, Jacksonville	Shellie Cousins, Stetson	2026 ASUN Conference softball tournament	UNF Softball Complex • Jacksonville, FL	Stetson
Big 12 Conference	Texas Tech	Sydney Stewart, Arizona	Ruby Meylan, Oklahoma State & NiJaree Canady, Texas Tech	Gerry Glasco, Texas Tech	2026 Big 12 Conference softball tournament	Devon Park • Oklahoma City, OK	Arizona State
Big East Conference	Providence & UConn	Cat Petteys, UConn	Alyssa Twomey, Providence	Providence	2026 Big East Conference softball tournament	Parkway Bank Sports Complex • Rosemont, IL	UConn
Big Sky Conference	Idaho State	Lafulafu Malepeai, Sacramento State	Marley Goluskin, Idaho State	Andrew Rich, Idaho State & Stef Ewing, Montana	2026 Big Sky Conference softball tournament	Miller Ranch Stadium • Pocatello, ID	Idaho State
Big South Conference	Winthrop	Taliyah Thomas, USC Upstate	Dakota Redmon, Radford	Kendall Fuller, Winthrop	2026 Big South Conference softball tournament	Cyrill Softball Stadium • Spartanburg, SC	USC Upstate
Big Ten Conference	Nebraska	Jordan Woolery, UCLA	Jordy Frahm, Nebraska	Rhonda Revelle, Nebraska	2026 Big Ten softball tournament	Maryland Softball Stadium • College Park, MD	Nebraska
Big West Conference	Cal State Fullerton	Sarah Perez, Cal State Fullerton	Taryn Irimata, Hawaii	Gina Oaks Garcia, Cal State Fullerton & Panita Thanatharn, Hawaii	2026 Big West Conference softball tournament	Anderson Family Field • Fullerton, CA	Cal State Fullerton
Coastal Athletic Association	North - Hofstra; South - Campbell & UNC Wilmington	Charlie Montgomery, Campbell	Camille Hamilton, UNC Wilmington	Susan Cassidy-Lyke, Hofstra	2026 Coastal Athletic Association softball tournament	Hunt Softball Park • Elon, NC	Charleston
Conference USA	Jacksonville State	Emma Elrod, Jacksonville State	Makenna Moore, Jacksonville State	Julie Boland, Jacksonville State	2026 Conference USA softball tournament	Delaware Softball Diamond • Newark, DE	Jacksonville State
Horizon League	Youngstown State	Courtney Poulich, Robert Morris	Kennedy Kimball, Youngstown State	Brian Campbell, Youngstown State	2026 Horizon League softball tournament	Regular season champion home stadium	Northern Kentucky
Ivy League	Princeton	Lauren Holt, Cornell & Jade Montgomery, Penn	Mads Lawson, Columbia	Princeton	2026 Ivy League softball tournament	Campus sites	Princeton
Metro Atlantic Athletic Conference	Marist	Peyton Pusey, Marist	Gracie Goewey, Siena	Joe Ausanio, Marist	2026 Metro Atlantic Athletic Conference softball tournament	Regular season champion home stadium	Marist
Mid-American Conference	Akron	Bailey Manos, Miami (OH)	Presley Hosick, Miami (OH)	Craig Nicholson, Akron	2026 Mid-American Conference softball tournament	Firestone Stadium • Akron, OH	Akron
Mid-Eastern Athletic Conference	Howard	Maryn Jordan, Howard	Aiko Conaway, Howard	Tori Tyson, Howard	2026 Mid-Eastern Athletic Conference softball tournament	NSU Softball Field • Norfolk, VA	Howard
Missouri Valley Conference	Belmont	Skylar Benesh, Northern Iowa	Maya Johnson, Belmont	Belmont	2026 Missouri Valley Conference softball tournament	Charlotte West Stadium • Carbondale, IL	Belmont
Mountain West Conference	Grand Canyon	Hannah Di Genova, Nevada	Lauren Fettic, UNLV	Shanon Hays, Grand Canyon	2026 Mountain West Conference softball tournament	Christina M. Hixson Softball Park • Reno, NV	Grand Canyon
NEC	LIU	Lily Hinkle, LIU	Karson Zavala, Wagner	Central Connecticut	2026 Northeast Conference softball tournament	Regular season champion home stadium	Wagner
Ohio Valley Conference	Eastern Illinois	Lizzie Stiverson, Eastern Illinois	Avery Arwood, SIU Edwardsville	Kristi & Dan Paulson, Eastern Illinois	2026 Ohio Valley Conference softball tournament	Louisville Slugger Sports Complex • Peoria, IL	Eastern Illinois
Patriot League	Boston University	Kylie Doherty, Boston University	Kasey Ricard, Boston University	Boston University	2026 Patriot League softball tournament	Campus sites	Boston University
Southeastern Conference	Oklahoma	Katie Stewart, Texas	Jocelyn Briski, Alabama	Patrick Murphy, Alabama	2026 SEC softball tournament	John Cropp Stadium • Lexington, KY	Texas
Southern Conference	UNC Greensboro	Olivia Shaw, Samford	Brooklyn Shroyer, UNC Greensboro	Janelle Breneman, UNC Greensboro	2026 Southern Conference softball tournament	Frost Stadium • Chattanooga, TN	UNC Greensboro
Southland Conference	Southeastern Louisiana	Victoria Altamirano, Incarnate Word	Hallie Burns, Southeastern Louisiana	Rick Fremin, Southeastern Louisiana	2026 Southland Conference softball tournament	Campus sites	McNeese
Southwestern Athletic Conference	East - Florida A&M; West - Prairie View A&M	Amari Brown, Florida A&M	Aaliyah Zabala, Southern	Brittney Williams, Southern	2026 Southwestern Athletic Conference softball tournament	Gulfport Sportsplex • Gulfport, MS	Florida A&M
Summit League	Omaha	Ella Cook, St. Thomas	Maddia Groff, Omaha	Mike Heard, Omaha	2026 Summit League softball tournament	Jane Sage Cowles Stadium • Minneapolis, MN (Note: St. Thomas is the designated host of the tournament, but elected to host on the campus of the University of Minnesota)	South Dakota
Sun Belt Conference	Louisiana–Monroe	Sydni Burko, Marshall	Maddy Azua, Texas State	Molly Fichtner, Louisiana–Monroe	2026 Sun Belt Conference softball tournament	Lamson Park • Lafayette, LA	South Alabama
West Coast Conference	Saint Mary's	Jaeya Butler, Oregon State	Odhi Vasquez, Saint Mary's	Sonja Garnett, Saint Mary's	No tournament, regular season champion earns auto bid		
Western Athletic Conference	California Baptist	Kinley Pappas, Utah Tech	Miranda De Nava, California Baptist	Brandon Telesco, California Baptist	2026 Western Athletic Conference softball tournament	Tarleton Softball Complex • Stephenville, TX	California Baptist

== Award winners ==
- USA Softball Collegiate Player of the Year: Jordy Frahm, Nebraska
- NFCA National Player of the Year: Jordy Frahm, Nebraska
- Softball America Player of the Year: Jordan Woolery, UCLA
- NFCA National Pitcher of the Year: Maya Johnson, Belmont
- Softball America Pitcher of the Year: Maya Johnson, Belmont
- NFCA National Freshman of the Year: Kendall Wells, Oklahoma
- Softball America Freshman of the Year: Kendall Wells, Oklahoma
- NFCA Catcher of the Year: Kendall Wells, Oklahoma
- NFCA Golden Shoe Award: Chelsea Mack, Louisville

== All-America Teams ==
The following players were members of the All-American Teams.

First Team

Position	Player	Class	School
P	Maya Johnson	R-SR.	Belmont
P	Jocelyn Briski	JR.	Alabama
P	Sage Mardjetko	JR.	Tennessee
C	Kendall Wells	FR.	Oklahoma
1B	Jordan Woolery	SR.	UCLA
2B	Aminah Vega	SR.	Duke
3B	Ella McDowell	SO.	Arkansas
SS	Isa Torres	JR.	Florida State
OF	Megan Grant	SR.	UCLA
OF	Ella Parker	JR.	Oklahoma
OF	Elon Butler	SR.	Oregon
UT	Jordy Frahm	SR.	Nebraska
UT	Mya Perez	JR.	Texas A&M
AT-L	Karlyn Pickens	SR.	Tennessee
AT-L	Kaitlyn Terry	JR.	Texas Tech
AT-L	Emily LeGette	JR.	North Carolina
AT-L	Robyn Herron	SR.	Arkansas
AT-L	Sydney Stewart	SR.	Arizona

Second Team

Position	Player	Class	School
P	NiJaree Canady	SR.	Texas Tech
P	Ruby Meylan	SR.	Oklahoma State
P	Kenzie Brown	SR.	Arizona State
C	Reese Atwood	SR.	Texas
1B	Katie Stewart	JR.	Texas
2B	Mia Williams	JR.	Texas Tech
3B	Jordan Lynch	SO.	Virginia Tech
SS	Jessica Oakland	R-JR.	Duke
OF	Sarah Gordon	SR.	Georgia
OF	Taylor Shumaker	SO.	Florida
OF	Sanaa Thompson	JR.	North Carolina
UT	Ashtyn Danley	JR.	Florida State
UT	Taryn Kern	SR	Stanford
AT-L	Madi George	FR.	Ole Miss
AT-L	Brooke Wells	SO.	Alabama
AT-L	Teagan Kavan	JR.	Texas
AT-L	Lauren Putz	SO.	Michigan
AT-L	Macee Eaton	JR.	Virginia

Third Team

Position	Player	Class	School
P	Bree Carrico	SO.	Virginia Tech
P	Jori Heard	SR.	South Carolina
P	Madison Azua	JR.	Texas State
C	Ella Boyer	FR.	Kansas
1B	Jackie Lis	SR.	Texas Tech
2B	Sierra Humphreys	JR.	UCF
3B	Jaysoni Beachum	JR.	Florida State
SS	Gabbie Garcia	SO.	Oklahoma
OF	Moriah Polar	JR.	Purdue
OF	Amari Harper	SR.	Oregon
OF	Kai Minor	FR.	Oklahoma
UT	Alexis Jensen	FR.	Nebraska
UT	Alexis Pupillo	SR.	Alabama
AT-L	Bri Despines	SR.	Louisville
AT-L	Jaydyn Goodwin	SR.	Georgia
AT-L	Jazzy Francik	SO.	Florida State
AT-L	Rylee Slimp	SO.	UCLA
AT-L	Keagan Rothrock	JR.	Florida

== See also ==
- 2026 NCAA Division I baseball season
