= 2026 Metro Atlantic Athletic Conference softball tournament =

College softball tournament in New York

- Teams: 6
- Format: Double-elimination tournament
- Finals site: Softball Park at Gartland Athletic Field; Poughkeepsie, New York
- Champions: Marist (6th title)
- Winning coach: Joe Ausanio (5th title)
- MVP: Peyton Pusey (Marist)
- Television: ESPN+

2026 Metro Atlantic Athletic Conference softball standings
	Conf.				Overall
Team	W		L	PCT	W		L	PCT
Marist ‍†‍‡‍^{y}	24	–	3	.889	37	–	21	.638
Fairfield ‍‍‍	19	–	7	.731	27	–	24	.529
Iona ‍‍‍	18	–	10	.643	27	–	26	.509
Sacred Heart ‍‍‍	16	–	11	.593	23	–	31	.426
Quinnipiac ‍‍‍	16	–	12	.571	24	–	21	.533
Siena ‍‍‍	15	–	12	.556	25	–	22	.532
Mount St. Mary's ‍‍‍	15	–	12	.556	20	–	28	.417
Rider ‍‍‍	14	–	13	.519	25	–	24	.510
Canisius ‍‍‍	11	–	15	.423	17	–	27	.386
Merrimack ‍‍‍	10	–	16	.385	12	–	29	.293
Manhattan ‍‍‍	10	–	18	.357	15	–	37	.288
Niagara ‍‍‍	5	–	22	.185	8	–	34	.190
Saint Peter's ‍‍‍	3	–	25	.107	7	–	44	.137
† – Conference champion ‡ – Tournament champion y – Invited to the NCAA tournament As of May 17, 2026; Rankings from NFCA/USA Today

The 2026 Metro Atlantic Athletic Conference softball tournament was held at the Softball Park at Gartland Athletic Field on the campus of Marist University in Poughkeepsie, New York from May 6 through May 9, 2026. The tournament was won by the Marist Red Foxes, who earned the Metro Atlantic Athletic Conference's automatic bid to the 2026 NCAA Division I softball tournament.

This was the last softball tournament held under the MAAC name. On May 27, 2026, the conference announced that it would adopt the new name of Metro Conference starting that July 1.

== Format and seeding ==
The top six finishers of the league's thirteen teams from the regular season qualified for the tournament. The top two seeds received a single bye, with the remaining teams playing opening round games.

== Tournament ==
=== Bracket ===
Upper round 1	Upper round 2	Upper final	Final
2	Fairfield	6
3	Iona	3	3	Iona	10
6	Siena	1	3	Iona	7
1	Marist	12
1	Marist	8
4	Sacred Heart	7	4	Sacred Heart	3
5	Quinnipiac	5
1	Marist	4	—
3	Iona	0	—
Lower round 1	Lower round 2	Lower round 3	Lower final
3	Iona	6
5	Quinnipiac	6	5	Quinnipiac	5
5	Quinnipiac	5	4	Sacred Heart	4
6	Siena	5	2	Fairfield	2
5	Quinnipiac	10

== All Tournament Team ==
Player	Team
Cierra Bender	Sacred Heart
Elle Leckroone	Sacred Heart
Riley Potter	Quinnipiac
Sofia Vega	Quinnipiac
Rachael Morales	Iona
Sara Piña	Iona
Hailey Guerrero	Iona
Haley Ahr	Marist
Samantha Rogers	Marist
Sienna Kunze	Marist
Ava Metzger	Marist
**Peyton Pusey**	Marist

MVP in bold
