= Ivy League softball tournament =

US sports championship

- Conference softball championship
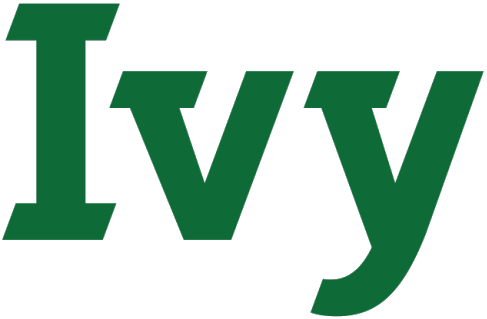
- Sport: College softball
- Conference: Ivy League
- Number of teams: 4
- Format: Double elimination
- Current stadium: Regular season champion
- Last contest: 2026
- Current champion: Princeton (6)
- Most championships: Harvard & Princeton (6)
- Official website: ivyleague.com/softball

Host stadiums
- Soldiers Field (2007, 2011-2012, 2016, 2019); Class of 1895 Field (2008, 2017); Niemand Robison Field (2009, 2010); Penn Park (2013); Dartmouth Softball Park (2014, 2015, 2018); Strubing Field (2022-2024); Cynthia Lynn Paul '94 Field (2025–2026)

Host locations
- Cambridge, MA (2007, 2011-2012, 2016, 2019); Princeton, NJ (2008, 2017, 2023-2026); Ithaca, NY (2009-2010); Philadelphia, PA (2013); Hanover, NH (2014, 2015, 2018)

The Ivy League softball tournament is the conference softball championship of the NCAA Division I Ivy League. The top four finishers from the round-robin regular season participate in a double elimination tournament held at the site of the regular season champion, with the winner earning the conference's automatic bid to the NCAA Division I softball tournament.

Harvard won the inaugural Ivy League tournament in 2023.

From 2007 until 2017, the top team in the North and South Division would play in a best-of-three series at the end of the regular season, which was known as the Ivy League Championship Series. For 2018, 2019, and 2022, the league's top two teams would play in a best-of-three series at the end of the regular season. The Series was not held in 2020 and 2021 when the series was canceled due to the COVID-19 pandemic In 2023, a baseball tournament was finally held. Brown is the most recent champion, having won their first championship in 2025.

== History ==
In 1980, the Ivy League instituted a regular season champion for softball play. Yale won the first Ivy title that year.

From 2007 to 2017, the teams were split into two divisions; the Mid-Atlantic members are in the Lou Gehrig Division, and the New England members are in the Red Rolfe Division. The winners of each division would meet in a best-of-three championship series to determine the Ivy League's automatic bid to the NCAA Division I softball tournament. The 2012 Series required a one-game playoff between Cornell and Penn, who each went 15-5. Penn won 4-0 on May 5, with Alexis Borden throwing a perfect game. Harvard then won the championship series (held on May 11 and May 12) in a two-game sweep.

Starting in 2023, the Ivy League would replace the series format with a four-team double elimination tournament held at the site of the regular season champion. The winner of the tournament would receive an automatic berth to the NCAA tournament. Princeton, Harvard, Yale, and Columbia were the four seeds of the first tournament in 2023. Harvard won the first softball tournament over Princeton. Princeton, Yale, Harvard, and Dartmouth were the field for 2024, and Princeton won the tournament. Princeton, Harvard, Columbia, and Brown were the field for 2025, and Brown became the first 4 seed to win the Ivy tournament.

== Champions ==
=== By year ===
The following is a list of conference champions and sites by year.

==== Championship Series ====
Year	Champion	Runner-up	Games	Venue
2007	Harvard	Penn	2	Soldiers Field • Cambridge, MA
2008	Princeton	Harvard	2	Class of 1895 Field • Princeton, NJ
2009	Cornell	Dartmouth	3	Niemand Robison Field • Ithaca, NY
2010	Cornell	Dartmouth	3	Niemand Robison Field • Ithaca, NY
2011	Harvard	Cornell	2	Soldiers Field • Cambridge, MA
2012	Harvard	Penn	2	Soldiers Field • Cambridge, MA
2013	Penn	Dartmouth	3	Penn Park • Philadelphia, PA
2014	Dartmouth	Penn	3	Dartmouth Softball Park • Hanover, NH
2015	Dartmouth	Penn	3	Dartmouth Softball Park • Hanover, NH
2016	Princeton	Harvard	3	Soldiers Field • Cambridge, MA
2017	Princeton	Harvard	2	Class of 1895 Field • Princeton, N.J.
2018	Harvard	Dartmouth	2	Dartmouth Softball Park • Hanover, NH
2019	Harvard	Columbia	2	Soldiers Field • Cambridge, MA
2020	Canceled due to the coronavirus pandemic			
2021	Canceled due to the coronavirus pandemic			
2022	Princeton	Harvard	3	Strubing Field • Princeton, NJ

==== Tournament ====
Year	Champion	Runner-up	Venue
2023	Harvard	Princeton	Strubing Field • Princeton, NJ
2024	Princeton	Harvard	Strubing Field • Princeton, NJ
2025	Brown	Princeton	Cynthia Lynn Paul '94 Field • Princeton, NJ
2026	Princeton	Columbia	Cynthia Lynn Paul '94 Field • Princeton, NJ

== Championships by school ==
The following is a list of conference champions listed by school.

Program	App.	Titles	Winning years
Princeton	8	6	2008, 2016, 2017, 2022, 2024, 2026
Columbia	3	0	
Harvard	13	6	2007, 2011, 2012, 2018, 2019, 2024
Yale	2	0	
Dartmouth	7	2	2014, 2015
Penn	5	1	2013
Brown	2	1	2025
Cornell	3	2	2009, 2010
