= 2015 Metro Atlantic Athletic Conference softball tournament =

The 2015 Metro Atlantic Athletic Conference (MAAC) softball tournament was held at Demske Sports Complex Complex on the campus of the Canisius College in Buffalo, New York, from May 6 through May 9, 2015. The Fairfield Stags won the tournament and earned the MAAC's automatic bid to the 2015 NCAA Division I softball tournament.

== Tournament ==
Upper round 1
4	Siena	4
5	Monmouth	5^{(5)}
3	Manhattan	0
6	Iona	10^{(6)}
Lower round 1
3	Manhattan	2
1	Canisius	1
4	Siena	2
6	Iona	1

Upper round 2
1	Canisius	1
5	Monmouth	12^{(5)}
2	Fairfield	6
6	Iona	2
Lower round 2
3	Manhattan	1
4	Siena	4

Upper final
5	Monmouth	12
2	Fairfield	8
Lower final
2	Fairfield	7
3	Manhattan	3

Final
5	Monmouth	5
2	Fairfield	8

- All times listed are Eastern Daylight Time.
