= 2026 Missouri Valley Conference softball tournament =

College softball tournament in Illinois

- Teams: 6
- Format: Double-elimination tournament
- Finals site: Charlotte West Stadium; Carbondale, Illinois
- Champions: Belmont (2nd title)
- Winning coach: Laura Matthews (2nd title)
- MVP: Maya Johnson (Belmont)
- Television: ESPN+

2026 Missouri Valley Conference softball standings
	Conf.						Overall
Team	W		L		T	PCT	W		L		T	PCT
Belmont ‍†‍‡‍^{y}	21	–	5	–	0	.808	41	–	13	–	0	.759
Southern Illinois ‍‍‍	21	–	6	–	0	.778	34	–	17	–	0	.667
Murray State ‍‍‍	17	–	9	–	0	.654	29	–	23	–	0	.558
Northern Iowa ‍‍‍	16	–	10	–	0	.615	28	–	24	–	0	.538
Illinois State ‍‍‍	16	–	13	–	0	.552	28	–	22	–	0	.560
Evansville ‍‍‍	12	–	15	–	0	.444	21	–	29	–	0	.420
Indiana State ‍‍‍	10	–	15	–	0	.400	22	–	28	–	0	.440
Valparaiso ‍‍‍	10	–	17	–	0	.370	20	–	30	–	0	.400
UIC ‍‍‍	10	–	18	–	0	.357	20	–	32	–	1	.387
Bradley ‍‍‍	8	–	20	–	0	.286	16	–	37	–	0	.302
Drake ‍‍‍	7	–	21	–	0	.250	12	–	36	–	0	.250
† – Conference champion ‡ – Tournament champion y – Invited to the NCAA tournament As of May 17, 2026; Rankings from NFCA/USA Today

The 2026 Missouri Valley Conference softball tournament was held at Charlotte West Stadium on the campus of Southern Illinois University in Carbondale, Illinois from May 6 through May 9, 2026. The tournament was won by the Belmont Bruins, who earned the Missouri Valley Conference's automatic bid to the 2026 NCAA Division I softball tournament.

== Format and seeding ==
The top six finishers of the league's eight teams from the regular season qualified for the tournament. The top two seeds received a single bye, with the remaining teams playing opening round games.

== Tournament ==
Upper round 1	Upper round 2	Upper final	Final
1	Belmont	4
4	Northern Iowa	6	5	Illinois State	0
5	Illinois State	7	1	Belmont	4
3	Murray State	0
2	Southern Illinois	5
3	Murray State	9	3	Murray State	6^{(9)}
6	Evansville	1
1	Belmont	8	—
3	Murray State	1	—
Lower round 1	Lower round 2	Lower round 3	Lower final
3	Murray State	6
2	Southern Illinois	1^{(8)}	2	Southern Illinois	1
5	Illinois State	7	5	Illinois State	0
4	Northern Iowa	11	4	Northern Iowa	6
6	Evansville	7

== All Tournament Team ==
Player	Team
Madison Dolecki	Belmont
Nicole Hughes	Belmont
**Maya Johnson**	Belmont
Rylee Spindler	Belmont
Niki Bode	Evansville
Paige McLeod	Illinois State
Hannah Meshnick	Illinois State
Karlye Graber	Murray State
Adison Hicks	Murray State
Allie Waldron	Murray State
Katelyn Callahan	Northern Iowa
Emily Delgado	Southern Illinois
Emily Williams	Southern Illinois

MVP in bold
