= 2026 Atlantic Sun Conference softball tournament =

College softball tournament in Florida

2026 ASUN Conference softball tournament
- Teams: 8
- Format: Double-elimination tournament
- Finals site: UNF Softball Complex; Jacksonville, Florida
- Champions: Stetson (6th title)
- Winning coach: Shellie Cousins (1st title)
- MVP: Hayley Arnold (Stetson)
- Television: ESPN+

2026 ASUN Conference softball standings
	Conf.						Overall
Team	W		L		T	PCT	W		L		T	PCT
Gold
Central Arkansas ^{x}‍‍‍	16	–	6	–	1	.717	36	–	20	–	1	.640
North Alabama ‍‍‍	17	–	7	–	0	.708	36	–	16	–	0	.692
Eastern Kentucky ‍‍‍	14	–	8	–	1	.630	27	–	25	–	1	.519
Austin Peay ‍‍‍	12	–	12	–	0	.500	30	–	24	–	0	.556
Lipscomb ‍‍‍	6	–	18	–	0	.250	13	–	38	–	0	.255
Bellarmine ‍‍‍	5	–	19	–	0	.208	12	–	38	–	0	.240
Graphite
Stetson ^{x}‍‍‡‍^{y}	18	–	6	–	0	.750	36	–	20	–	0	.643
Jacksonville ‍‍‍	16	–	8	–	0	.667	34	–	21	–	0	.618
Florida Gulf Coast ‍‍‍	14	–	10	–	0	.583	21	–	33	–	0	.389
North Florida ‍‍‍	11	–	13	–	0	.458	39	–	22	–	0	.639
West Georgia* ‍‍‍	8	–	16	–	0	.333	16	–	39	–	0	.291
Queens (NC) ‍‍‍	5	–	19	–	0	.208	13	–	34	–	0	.277
* ineligible for the 2026 NCAA tournament due to transition from Division II
x – Division champion ‡ – Tournament champion y – Invited to the NCAA tournament As of May 9, 2026; Rankings from NFCA/USA Today

The 2026 ASUN Conference softball tournament was held at UNF Softball Complex on the campus of the University of North Florida in Jacksonville, Florida from May 5 through May 9, 2026. The tournament was won by the Stetson Hatters, who earned the Atlantic Sun Conference's automatic bid to the 2026 NCAA Division I softball tournament.

== Format and seeding ==
The top eight finishers of the league's twelve teams from the regular season qualified for the tournament. The bottom four seeds played an opening single elimination round, while the top four seeds and winners of the opening played a double-elimination tournament.

== Tournament ==
=== Opening round ===
Tuesday, May 5
Team	R
#8 Austin Peay	1
#5 Florida Gulf Coast	2
Notes: Austin Peay eliminated

Tuesday, May 5
Team	R
#7 North Florida	8
#6 Eastern Kentucky	5
Notes: Eastern Kentucky eliminated

=== Bracket ===
Upper round 1	Upper round 2	Upper final	Final
1	Central Arkansas	8^{(5)}
4	Jacksonville	6	4	Jacksonville	0
5	Florida Gulf Coast	2	1	Central Arkansas	2
2	Stetson	8
2	Stetson	4
3	North Alabama	1	7	North Florida	2
7	North Florida	4
2	Stetson	4	—
1	Central Arkansas	0	—
Lower round 1	Lower round 2	Lower round 3	Lower final
4	Jacksonville	1
4	Jacksonville	9	1	Central Arkansas	6
3	North Alabama	0	7	North Florida	2
5	Florida Gulf Coast	2	7	North Florida	1
3	North Alabama	10^{(6)}

== All Tournament Team ==
Player	Team
**Hayley Arnold**	Stetson
Ava Braswell	Stetson
Nicole Edmiaston	Stetson
Irianis Garcia	Stetson
Lucy Crowder	Central Arkansas
Trinity Brandon	Central Arkansas
Grace Molitor	Central Arkansas
Jaida Thomas	Jacksonville
Jacy Harrelson	Jacksonville
Taylor Cook	North Florida
Katie Simon	North Alabama

MVP in bold
