= 2015 Ivy League Softball Championship Series =

The 2015 Ivy League Softball Championship Series was held at Dartmouth Softball Park in Hanover, New Hampshire, the home field of Dartmouth on May 2, 2015. The series matched the regular season champions of each of the league's two divisions. The winner of the series claimed the Ivy League's automatic berth in the 2015 NCAA Division I softball tournament. All games in the series would be broadcast on the Ivy League Digital Network.

Dartmouth claimed the Rolfe Division title while Penn won the Gehrig Division, making the third consecutive season Dartmouth and Penn would face off for the right to advance to the NCAA Tournament. In the end Dartmouth would walk away with their second consecutive Ivy League title.

== Results ==
Game One

May 2, 2015 1:00 p.m.
Team	1	2	3	4	5	6	7	R	H	E
Penn	0	1	0	0	0	0	0	1	6	1
Dartmouth	0	0	0	0	1	0	1	2	8	1
WP: Kristen Rumley (15-10) LP: Alexis Borden (11-12) Sv: None; Home runs: Penn: Alexis Sargent; Dar: None; Attendance: 512; Boxscore

Game Two

May 2, 2015 3:29 p.m.
Team	1	2	3	4	5	6	7	R	H	E
Dartmouth	1	0	0	0	0	0	0	1	7	0
Penn	0	0	0	0	0	0	0	0	4	0
WP: Morgan McCalmon (10-2) LP: Alexis Borden (11-13) Sv: None; Attendance: 550; Boxscore
