= 2026 Mountain West Conference softball tournament =

College softball tournament in Nevada

- Teams: 6
- Format: Double-elimination tournament
- Finals site: Christina M. Hixson Softball Park; Reno, Nevada
- Champions: Grand Canyon (1st title)
- Winning coach: Shanon Hays (1st title)
- MVP: Oakley Vickers (Grand Canyon)
- Television: MWN

2026 Mountain West Conference softball standings
	Conf.				Overall
Team	W		L	PCT	W		L	PCT
No. 21 Grand Canyon ‍†‍‡‍^{y}	21	–	4	.840	52	–	8	.867
UNLV ‍‍‍	18	–	7	.720	31	–	22	.585
Nevada ‍‍‍	16	–	9	.640	39	–	20	.661
New Mexico ‍‍‍	13	–	12	.520	28	–	27	.509
Fresno State ‍‍‍	12	–	13	.480	23	–	24	.489
Boise State ‍‍‍	11	–	14	.440	25	–	30	.455
Colorado State ‍‍‍	11	–	14	.440	23	–	28	.451
San Diego State ‍‍‍	9	–	16	.360	24	–	26	.480
Utah State ‍‍‍	7	–	18	.280	19	–	35	.352
San Jose State ‍‍‍	7	–	18	.280	15	–	33	.313
† – Conference champion ‡ – Tournament champion y – Invited to the NCAA tournament As of May 9, 2026; Rankings from NFCA/USA Today

The 2026 Mountain West Conference softball tournament was held at Christina M. Hixson Softball Park on the campus of the University of Nevada in Reno, Nevada from May 6 through May 9, 2026. The tournament was won by the Grand Canyon Antelopes, who earned the Mountain West Conference's automatic bid to the 2026 NCAA Division I softball tournament.

== Format and seeding ==
The top six finishers of the league's twelve teams from the regular season qualified for the tournament. The bottom four seeds played in a single-elimination play-in round to begin the tournament. The two play-in round winners then joined the top two seeds in a four-team double-elimination tournament.

== Tournament ==
Play-in round	Upper round 2	Upper final	Final
1	Grand Canyon	7
4	New Mexico	7	4	New Mexico	6
5	Fresno State	2	1	Grand Canyon	10
3	Nevada	14
2	UNLV	6
3	Nevada	10^{(5)}	3	Nevada	13
6	Colorado State	1
3	Nevada	0	10
1	Grand Canyon	3	11^{(9)}
Lower round 3	Lower final
1	Grand Canyon	11
4	New Mexico	5	4	New Mexico	7
2	UNLV	0

== All Tournament Team ==
Player	Team
Tinley Lucas	Grand Canyon
Trinity Martin	Grand Canyon
Addison Shifflett	Grand Canyon
**Oakley Vickers**	Grand Canyon
Hannah Di Genova	Nevada
Haylee Engelbrecht	Nevada
Hailey McLean	Nevada
Caitlin Benningfield	New Mexico
Jessica DeLeon	New Mexico
Presley Barnes	UNLV
Natalie Turner	UNLV

MVP in bold
