= 2026 Coastal Athletic Association softball tournament =

- Teams: 6
- Format: Double-elimination tournament
- Finals site: Hunt Softball Park; Elon, North Carolina
- Champions: Charleston (1st title)
- Winning coach: Maggie Mrowka (1st title)
- MVP: Mackenzie Mathis (Charleston)
- Television: FloCollege

2026 Coastal Athletic Association softball standings
	Conf.				Overall
Team	W		L	PCT	W		L	PCT
North
Hofstra ^{x}‍‍‍	21	–	3	.875	31	–	23	.574
Stony Brook ‍‍‍	11	–	13	.458	21	–	29	.420
Drexel ‍‍‍	11	–	13	.458	22	–	23	.489
Monmouth ‍‍‍	10	–	14	.417	20	–	31	.392
Towson ‍‍‍	8	–	16	.333	25	–	26	.490
South
UNC Wilmington ^{x}‍‍‍	18	–	6	.750	32	–	19	.627
Campbell ^{x}‍‍‍	18	–	6	.750	34	–	23	.596
Charleston ‍‍‡‍^{y}	14	–	10	.583	30	–	28	.517
Elon ‍‍‍	12	–	12	.500	18	–	33	.353
North Carolina A&T ‍‍‍	5	–	19	.208	20	–	33	.377
Hampton ‍‍‍	4	–	20	.167	10	–	33	.233
x – Division champion ‡ – Tournament champion y – Invited to the NCAA tournament As of May 9, 2026; Rankings from NFCA/USA Today

The 2026 Coastal Athletic Association softball tournament was held at Hunt Softball Park on the campus of Elon University in Elon, North Carolina from May 6 through May 9, 2026. The tournament was won by the Charleston Cougars, who earned the Coastal Athletic Association's automatic bid to the 2026 NCAA Division I softball tournament.

== Format and seeding ==
The top six finishers of the league's eleven teams from the regular season qualified for the tournament. The top two seeds received a single bye, with the remaining teams playing opening round games.

== Tournament ==
Upper round 1	Upper round 2	Upper final	Final
1	Hofstra	2
4	Stony Brook	1	5	Charleston	4
5	Charleston	5	5	Charleston	6
3	Campbell	0
2	UNC Wilmington	4
3	Campbell	4	3	Campbell	9
6	Elon	3
5	Charleston	5	—
1	Hofstra	0	—
Lower round 1	Lower round 2	Lower round 3	Lower final
1	Hofstra	3
2	UNC Wilmington	1	3	Campbell	0
4	Stony Brook	3	1	Hofstra	6
4	Stony Brook	5	2	UNC Wilmington	7
6	Elon	3

== All Tournament Team ==
Player	Team
**Mackenzie Mathis**	Charleston
Halle Cannon	Charleston
Bronwyn Conroy	Charleston
Austy Miller	Charleston
Madison Biddle	UNC Wilmington
Makayla Huddleston	UNC Wilmington
Nicole Cancel	Hofstra
Emma Falen	Hofstra
Lily Yepez	Hofstra
Katelyn Hubley	Campbell
Charlie Montgomery	Campbell

MVP in bold
