= 2026 Ivy League softball tournament =

College softball tournament in New Jersey

- Teams: 4
- Format: Double-elimination tournament
- Finals site: Cynthia Lynn Paul '94 Field; Princeton, New Jersey
- Champions: Princeton (6th title)
- Winning coach: Lisa Van Ackeren (5th title)
- MVP: Cassidy Shaw (Princeton)
- Television: ESPN+

2026 Ivy League softball standings
	Conf.						Overall
Team	W		L		T	PCT	W		L		T	PCT
Princeton ‍†‍‡‍^{y}	18	–	3	–	0	.857	34	–	15	–	0	.694
Columbia ‍‍‍	12	–	9	–	0	.571	22	–	23	–	0	.489
Harvard ‍‍‍	12	–	9	–	0	.571	21	–	23	–	1	.478
Brown ‍‍‍	11	–	9	–	0	.550	21	–	23	–	0	.477
Cornell ‍‍‍	8	–	13	–	0	.381	21	–	22	–	0	.488
Penn ‍‍‍	8	–	13	–	0	.381	17	–	27	–	0	.386
Dartmouth ‍‍‍	7	–	13	–	0	.350	9	–	23	–	0	.281
Yale ‍‍‍	7	–	14	–	0	.333	17	–	28	–	0	.378
† – Conference champion ‡ – Tournament champion y – Invited to the NCAA tournament As of May 17, 2026; Rankings from NFCA/USA Today

The 2026 Ivy League softball tournament was held at Cynthia Lynn Paul '94 Field in Princeton, New Jersey from May 7 through May 9, 2026. The tournament was won by the Princeton Tigers, who earned the Ivy League's automatic bid to the 2026 NCAA Division I softball tournament.

== Format and seeding ==
The top four teams from the conference's round-robin regular season will qualify for the tournament, and will be seeded one through four. They will play a double-elimination tournament.

== Tournament ==
Upper round 1
1	Princeton	7
4	Brown	5
3	Columbia	7
2	Harvard	0
Lower round 1
4	Brown	8
2	Harvard	2

Upper final
1	Princeton	6
3	Columbia	1
Lower final
3	Columbia	2^{(12)}
4	Brown	1

Final
1	Princeton	8^{(5)}	—
3	Columbia	0	—

== All Tournament Team ==
Player	Team
**Cassidy Shaw**	Princeton
Graciela Dominguez	Princeton
Maddie Ratcheson	Princeton
Jessica Phelps	Princeton
Mads Lawson	Columbia
Alicia Marzouca	Columbia
Juju O'Brien	Columbia
Macy Borowski	Brown
Cameron Zytkewicz Ray	Brown
Finley Payne	Harvard
Riley Flynn	Harvard

MVP in bold
