= Maya Johnson (softball) =

American softball player

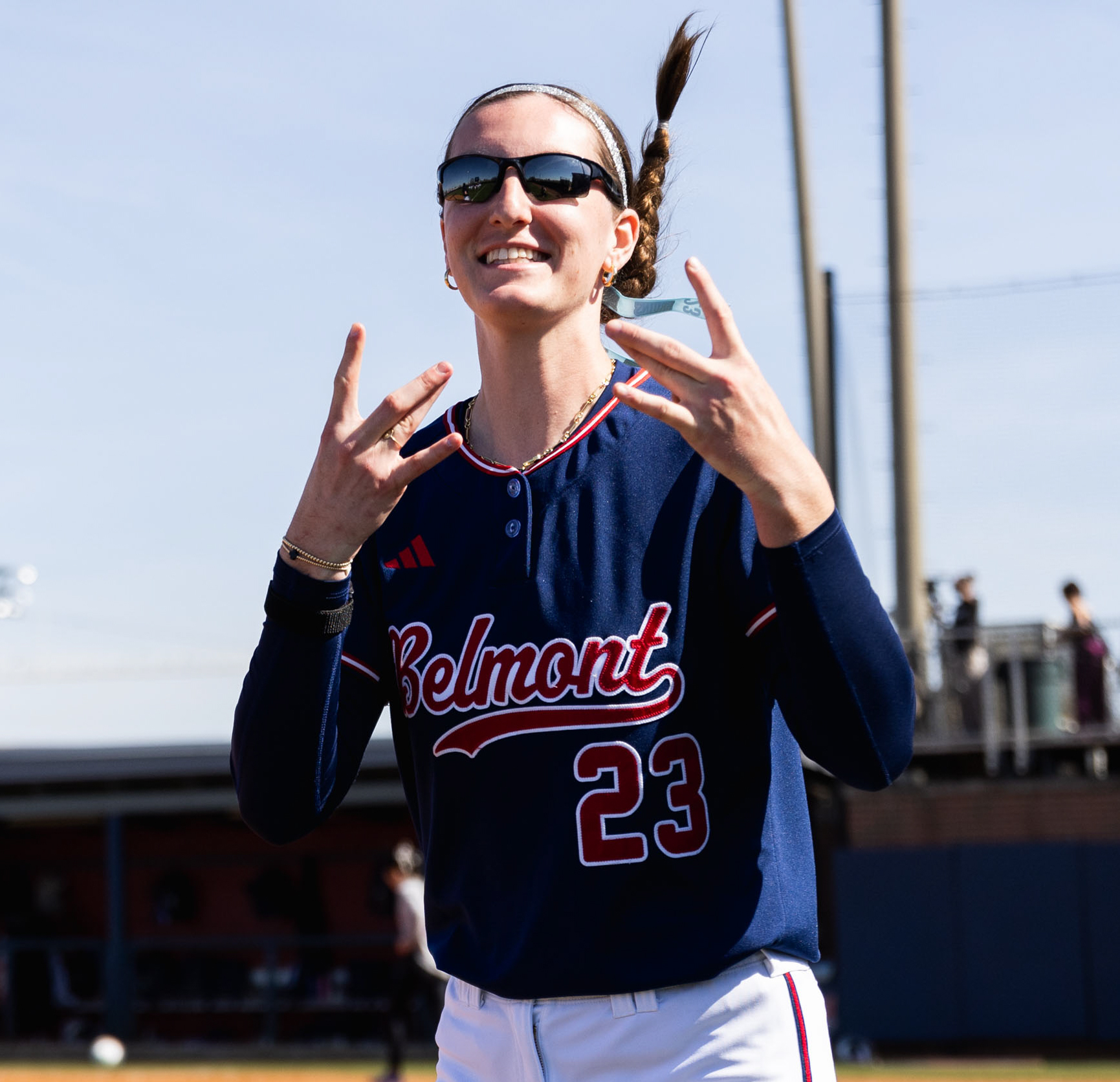
- Johnson at Belmont in 2026

Oklahoma City Spark
- Pitcher
- Bats: Left Throws: Left

Teams
- Belmont (2023–2026); Oklahoma City Spark (2026–present)

Career highlights and awards
- NFCA National Pitcher of the Year (2026); Softball America Pitcher of the Year (2026); 2× First team All-American (2025, 2026); 2× Missouri Valley Conference Pitcher of the Year (2025, 2026); 3× First team All-MVC (2024–2026)

Maya Johnson is an American professional softball player for the Oklahoma City Spark of the Athletes Unlimited Softball League (AUSL). She played college softball at Belmont and was named the NFCA National Pitcher of the Year in 2026.

== College career ==
Johnson was originally committed to play college softball at Pittsburgh, however, Pitt's medical staff did not clear her to compete, forcing her to redshirt and enter the NCAA transfer portal. She committed to play at Bowling Green State, which had agreed to clear her for competition. Two weeks later, the coach who recruited her left the program for an opportunity at Bradley. Johnson had hoped to follow, but was once again denied approval to play. She returned to the transfer portal, before transferring to Belmont.

During her redshirt freshman year in 2023, she appeared in 22 games with 14 starts, and posted an 11–6 record, with a 2.26 earned run average (ERA) and 207 strikeouts in 133 innings pitched. During her redshirt sophomore year in 2024, she appeared in 26 games with 20 starts, and posted a 16–5 record, with a 1.49 ERA and 216 strikeouts in 141 1/3 innings pitched.

During her redshirt junior year in 2025, she appeared in 35 games with 32 starts, and posted a 24–6 record, with a 1.52 ERA and 366 strikeouts in 207 innings pitched. She ranked first nationally in strikeouts (366), strikeout-to-walk ratio (16.64), strikeouts per seven innings (12.4), WHIP (0.65), walks allowed per seven innings (0.74), and shutouts (11). On February 9, 2025, during a game against Eastern Kentucky, she pitched her first career perfect game and the second in program history. She helped Belmont win the 2025 Missouri Valley Conference (MVC) tournament and advance to the NCAA tournament for the first time in program history. Following the season she was named the MVC Pitcher of the Year and an NFCA First Team All-American. She became the first Belmont player of the NCAA Division I era named First Team All-American in any sport.

During her redshirt senior year in 2026, she appeared in 34 games with 31 starts, and posted a 28–3 record, with two saves, a 0.78 ERA and 397 strikeouts in 215 2/3 innings pitched. She led the nation in ERA (0.78), strikeouts (397), shutouts (15), strikeouts per seven innings (12.9), WHIP (0.68), and strikeout-to-walk ratio (11.03). She had three no-hitters and one perfect game during the season. She helped Belmont win the 2026 MVC tournament and advance to the 2026 NCAA tournament. Following the season she was named the Softball America Pitcher of the Year and NFCA National Pitcher of the Year. She became the first honoree from Belmont and the Missouri Valley Conference to win the award.

== Professional career ==
On May 4, 2026, Johnson was drafted third overall by the Oklahoma City Spark in the 2026 AUSL College Draft. On May 26, 2026, she signed a rookie contract with the Spark.

== Personal life ==
Johnson was diagnosed with lupus at 15 years old.
