= 2026 Southwestern Athletic Conference softball tournament =

College softball tournament in Mississippi

- Teams: 8
- Format: Double-elimination tournament
- Finals site: Gulfport Sportsplex; Gulfport, Mississippi
- Champions: Florida A&M (1st title)
- Winning coach: Brittany Beall (1st title)
- MVP: Samantha Smith (Florida A&M)
- Television: ESPN+

2026 Southwestern Athletic Conference softball standings
	Conf.				Overall
Team	W		L	PCT	W		L	PCT
East
Florida A&M ^{x}‍‍‡‍^{y}	19	–	5	.792	32	–	22	.593
Jackson State ‍‍‍	16	–	8	.667	25	–	23	.521
Bethune-Cookman ‍‍‍	16	–	8	.667	21	–	28	.429
Alabama State ‍‍‍	15	–	9	.625	23	–	30	.434
Alabama A&M ‍‍‍	6	–	18	.250	19	–	31	.380
Mississippi Valley State ‍‍‍	0	–	24	.000	1	–	38	.026
West
Prairie View A&M ^{x}‍‍‍	19	–	4	.826	27	–	17	.614
Southern ‍‍‍	18	–	6	.750	37	–	15	.712
Texas Southern ‍‍‍	17	–	6	.739	30	–	11	.732
Arkansas-Pine Bluff ‍‍‍	7	–	15	.318	14	–	31	.311
Grambling State ‍‍‍	5	–	18	.217	13	–	28	.317
Alcorn State ‍‍‍	3	–	20	.130	15	–	34	.306
x – Division champion ‡ – Tournament champion y – Invited to the NCAA tournament As of May 17, 2026; Rankings from NFCA/USA Today

The 2026 Southwestern Athletic Conference softball tournament was held at Gulfport Sportsplex on the campus of the Mississippi Valley State University in Gulfport, Mississippi from May 5 through May 9, 2026. The tournament was won by the Florida A&M Lady Rattlers, who earned the Southwestern Athletic Conference's automatic bid to the 2026 NCAA Division I softball tournament.

== Format and seeding ==
The top four finishers in each of the league's two divisions from the regular season qualified for the tournament.

== Tournament ==
Upper round 1	Upper round 2	Upper final	Final
E2	Jackson State	1
W3	Texas Southern	4
W3	Texas Southern	3
E4	Alabama State	0
W1	Prairie View A&M	1
E4	Alabama State	2
W3	Texas Southern	2
E1	Florida A&M	3
W2	Southern	10^{(5)}
E3	Bethune-Cookman	1
W2	Southern	4
E1	Florida A&M	5^{(11)}
E1	Florida A&M	4
W4	Arkansas-Pine Bluff	1	E1	Florida A&M	0	2
W2	Southern	8^{(5)}	1
Lower round 1	Lower round 2	Lower round 3	Lower final
E4	Alabama State	10
E2	Jackson State	8	E2	Jackson State	5	W3	Texas Southern	0
W1	Prairie View A&M	2	E4	Alabama State	3	W2	Southern	2
W2	Southern	7
W2	Southern	2
E3	Bethune-Cookman	7	E3	Bethune-Cookman	1
W4	Arkansas-Pine Bluff	2

== All Tournament Team ==
Player	Team
Zaria Turner	Texas Southern
Jade McQueen	Texas Southern
Kohana Pousson	Alabama State
Abigail Mitchell	Southern
Asia George	Southern
Ava Wallace	Southern
Aaliyah Zabala	Southern
Neriah Lee	Florida A&M
Amari Brown	Florida A&M
Zoryana Hughes	Florida A&M
Jamison Townsend	Florida A&M
**Samantha Smith**	Florida A&M

MVP in bold
