= 2026 America East Conference softball tournament =

College softball tournament in Maine

- Teams: 5
- Format: Double-elimination tournament
- Finals site: Pierre & Catherine Labat Softball Complex; Orono, Maine
- Champions: Binghamton (3rd title)
- Winning coach: Jess Bump (2nd title)
- MVP: Rachel Carey (Binghamton)
- Television: ESPN+

2026 America East Conference softball standings
	Conf.						Overall
Team	W		L		T	PCT	W		L		T	PCT
Bryant ‍†‍‍	16	–	4	–	0	.800	21	–	23	–	0	.477
Binghamton ‍‍‡‍^{y}	15	–	5	–	0	.750	20	–	25	–	0	.444
Albany ‍‍‍	13	–	7	–	0	.650	25	–	20	–	0	.556
UMass Lowell ‍‍‍	11	–	10	–	0	.524	27	–	27	–	0	.500
Maine ‍‍‍	6	–	14	–	0	.300	13	–	36	–	0	.265
UMBC ‍‍‍	0	–	21	–	0	.000	11	–	9	–	0	.550
† – Conference champion ‡ – Tournament champion y – Invited to the NCAA tournament As of May 9, 2026; Rankings from NFCA/USA Today

The 2026 America East Conference softball tournament was held at Pierre & Catherine Labat Softball Complex on the campus of the University of Maine in Orono, Maine from May 6 through May 9, 2026. The tournament was won by the Binghamton Bearcats, who earned the America East Conference's automatic bid to the 2026 NCAA Division I softball tournament.

== Format and seeding ==
All five America East softball teams that were still playing participated in the tournament and were seeded based on conference record. The regular season winner earned a single bye, while the remaining teams played opening round games.

== Tournament ==
Upper round 1
3	Albany	1
4	UMass Lowell	8
Lower round 1
3	Albany	3
5	Maine	1

Upper round 2
1	Bryant	2
4	UMass Lowell	9
2	Binghamton	12^{(5)}
5	Maine	5
Lower round 2
1	Bryant	8^{(5)}
3	Albany	0

Upper final
4	UMass Lowell	4
2	Binghamton	3
Lower final
2	Binghamton	10^{(5)}
1	Bryant	1

Final
4	UMass Lowell	8	2
2	Binghamton	10	4

== All Tournament Team ==
Player	Team
**Rachel Carey**	Binghamton
Delaney Glover	Binghamton
Olivia Kennedy	Binghamton
Lauren Payne	Binghamton
Giana LaCedra	UMass Lowell
Isabel Quintanilla	UMass Lowell
Thyanais Santiago	UMass Lowell
Ava Zettlemoyer	Maine
Deanna Drahek	Albany
Julia Pike	Albany
Gabriella Gesualdo	Bryant
Lexi Powell	Bryant

MVP in bold
