= Siena Saints softball =

College softball team

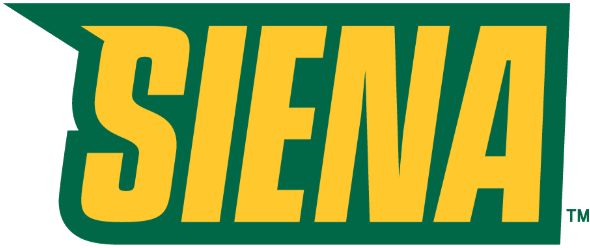
- University: Siena College
- Head coach: Casey Bump (4th season)
- Conference: MAAC
- Location: Albany, New York, US
- Home stadium: Siena Softball Field
- Nickname: Saints
- Colors: Green and gold

NCAA Tournament appearances
- 2024

Conference tournament championships
- 2024

Regular-season conference championships
- 2013

The Siena Saints softball team represents Siena College in college softball for NCAA Division I. The team participates in the Metro Atlantic Athletic Conference (MAAC). From 1984 until 1989, the Saints were a member of the America East Conference (AEC). The Saints are currently led by head coach Casey Bump. The team plays its home games at Siena Softball Field located on the university's campus.

== History ==
Since joining the Metro Atlantic Athletic Conference in 1990, the Saints have managed to win one regular season title, doing so in 2013 in a tie with Fairfield. Despite their successful 2013 regular season, the Saints failed to win the MAAC tournament championship, losing their opening game to Niagara and were eliminated by Fairfield. They won the 2024 MAAC tournament, and advanced to the 2024 NCAA Division I softball tournament for the first time in program history.

Siena's head coaches have won the MAAC Softball Coach of the Year award twice, doing so in 1999 with Barb Finke and in 2013 with Bill Lajeunesse. The team has also won three MAAC Softball Player of the Year awards, winning in 2012 with Shannon Jones and in 2017 and 2019 with Madysen Cossack.

=== Coaching history ===
Years	Coach	Record	%
1976	Ellen McEwen	1–3	.250
1977–1978	Fred Pidgeon	9–11	.450
1979–1982, 1984–1989	Joyce Legere	86–82	.512
1983	Charles Turner	6–9	.400
1990–1996	Angela Fedullo	46–153–1	.233
1997–2002	Barb Sauter	70–167	.295
2003–2006	Peejay Brun	68–117–1	.368
2007–2010	Deanna Parks	53–126	.296
2011–2020	Bill Lajeunesse	200–247–1	.448
2021–present	Casey Bump	177–124–1	.588

== Roster ==
2024 Siena Saints roster
Pitchers: 18 – Alissa Eimont – Redshirt Sophomore; 12 – Hailey Francois – Freshman; 6 – Gracie Goewey – Freshman; 8 – Kaycie Kennedy – Junior; 3 – Nicole Patille – Graduate Student; Catchers: 11 – Madi Silber – Junior; 22 – Emmalynn Skaff – Junior; 9 – Jocelyn Ulrich – Graduate Student	Infielders: 5 – Laila Aponte – Junior; 0 – Chloe Cummings – Freshman; 23 – Ashley Giampolo – Junior; 2 – Nicolette Kasch – Junior; 44 – Mary Mikalsen – Freshman; 19 – Alexa Panagopoylos – Freshman; 26 – Diana Parker – Redshirt Senior; 21 – Avamarie Perry – Freshman; 8 – Emma Petersen – Sophomore; 1 – Carlie Venables – Freshman; Outfielders: 24 – Mikala Fletcher – Senior; 32 – Isabella Pardo – Senior; 14 – Kyleigh Potter – Junior; 15 – McKenzie Swinson – Junior

== Season-by-season results ==
Record table
Season	Coach	Overall	Conference	Standing	Postseason
Siena Saints (Independent) (1976–1984)
1976	Ellen McEwen	1–3			
1977	Fred Pidgeon	2–6			
1978	Fred Pidgeon	7–5			
1979	Joyce Legere	14–2			
1980	Joyce Legere	11–2			
1981	Joyce Legere	12–3			
1982	Joyce Legere	12–5			
1983	Charles Turner	6–9			
1984	Joyce Legere	9–7			
Siena Saints (America East Conference) (1985–1989)
1985	Joyce Legere	5–19			
1986	Joyce Legere	2–18			
1987	Joyce Legere	7–9			
1988	Joyce Legere	9–7			
1989	Joyce Legere	5–10			
Siena Saints (Metro Atlantic Athletic Conference) (1990–present)
1990	Angela Fedullo	10–13		11th	
1991	Angela Fedullo	9–25		6th	
1992	Angela Fedullo	4–22–1	2–12	7th	
1993	Angela Fedullo	6–24	2–10	6th	
1994	Angela Fedullo	5–20	2–10	7th	
1995	Angela Fedullo	7–26	3–9	7th	
1996	Angela Fedullo	5–23	1–11	7th	
1997	Barb Sauter	8–21	2–10	6th	
1998	Barb Sauter	2–35	0–16	9th	
1999	Barb Sauter	17–22	6–10	7th	
2000	Barb Sauter	15–33	4–12	T–8th	
2001	Barb Sauter	16–30	3–13	8th	
2002	Barb Sauter	12–26	5–11	7th	
2003	Peejay Brun	14–23	10–6	4th	
2004	Peejay Brun	14–33–1	5–11	T–7th	
2005	Peejay Brun	22–27	7–9	6th	
2006	Peejay Brun	18–34	7–9	5th	
2007	Deanna Parks	11–25	7–9	T–6th	
2008	Deanna Parks	16–33	5–11	T–7th	
2009	Deanna Parks	12–31	7–9	7th	
2010	Deanna Parks	14–37	7–9	7th	
2011	Bill Lajeunesse	20–25	8–8	5th	
2012	Bill Lajeunesse	20–30	8–8	5th	
2013	Bill Lajeunesse	21–26	12–4	T–1st	
2014	Bill Lajeunesse	29–26	13–7	4th	
2015	Bill Lajeunesse	21–27–1	13–7	T–3rd	
2016	Bill Lajeunesse	25–22	10–10	7th	
2017	Bill Lajeunesse	21–30	14–6	2nd	
2018	Bill Lajeunesse	18–26	13–7	3rd	
2019	Bill Lajeunesse	22–25	13–7	3rd	
2020	Bill Lajeunesse	3–10	0–0	N/A	Season cut short due to COVID-19 pandemic
2021	Casey Bump	19–15	19–13	5th	
2022	Casey Bump	32–23	14–6	3rd	
2023	Casey Bump	32–21	11–9	T–4th	
2024	Casey Bump	33–22	12–11	6th	NCAA Regionals
2025	Casey Bump	36–21–1	16–17–1	4th	
2026	Casey Bump	25–22	15–12	T–6th	
Total:		680–1,018–4 (.401)			
National champion Postseason invitational champion Conference regular season champion Conference regular season and conference tournament champion Division regular season champion Division regular season and conference tournament champion Conference tournament champion

== See also ==
- List of NCAA Division I softball programs
