= Softball America Pitcher of the Year =

American college softball award

- Awarded for: Best pitcher in college softball
- Country: United States
- Presented by: Wilson Sporting Goods

History
- First award: 2019
- Most recent: Maya Johnson, Belmont

The Softball America Pitcher of the Year is an award given by Wilson Sporting Goods to the best college softball pitcher of the year. The award has been given annually since 2019.

== Winners ==
Year	Player	School	Ref
2019	Giselle Juarez	Oklahoma	
2020	Megan Faraimo	UCLA	
2021	Odicci Alexander	James Madison	
2022	Georgina Corrick	South Florida	
2023	Montana Fouts	Alabama	
2024	NiJaree Canady	Stanford	
2025	Karlyn Pickens	Tennessee	
2026	Maya Johnson	Belmont	
