= 2026 Ohio Valley Conference softball tournament =

College softball tournament in Illinois

- Teams: 8
- Format: Single elimination play-in, then six-team double-elimination tournament
- Finals site: OSF HealthCare Field; Peoria, Illinois
- Champions: Eastern Illinois (3rd title)
- Winning coach: Kristi Paulson; Dan Paulson (2nd title)
- MVP: Karlie McKenzie (Eastern Illinois)
- Television: ESPN+

2026 Ohio Valley Conference softball standings
	Conf.				Overall
Team	W		L	PCT	W		L	PCT
Eastern Illinois ‍†‍‡‍^{y}	23	–	3	.885	36	–	23	.610
UT Martin ‍‍‍	20	–	6	.769	33	–	21	.611
SIU Edwardsville ‍‍‍	18	–	9	.667	29	–	29	.500
Lindenwood ‍‍‍	17	–	10	.630	32	–	24	.571
Southeast Missouri State ‍‍‍	16	–	10	.615	23	–	30	.434
Tennessee Tech ‍‍‍	11	–	16	.407	16	–	34	.320
Southern Indiana ‍‍‍	11	–	16	.407	15	–	32	.319
Western Illinois ‍‍‍	9	–	17	.346	14	–	32	.304
Morehead State ‍‍‍	6	–	21	.222	7	–	38	.156
Tennessee State ‍‍‍	2	–	25	.074	2	–	37	.051
† – Conference champion ‡ – Tournament champion y – Invited to the NCAA tournament As of May 17, 2026; Rankings from NFCA/USA Today

The 2026 Ohio Valley Conference softball tournament was held at OSF HealthCare Field in Peoria, Illinois from May 6 through May 9, 2026. The tournament was won by the Eastern Illinois Panthers, who earned the Ohio Valley Conference's automatic bid to the 2026 NCAA Division I softball tournament.

== Format and seeding ==
Eight OVC softball teams out of the ten teams will participate in the tournament and will be seeded based on conference record. The bottom four seeds will play in a single-elimination play-in round to begin the tournament. The two play-in round winners will then join the top four seeds in a six-team double-elimination tournament, with the top two seeds receiving byes into the third round, and the third and fourth placed teams playing the play-in round winners in the second round.

== Tournament ==
Play-in round
6	Southern Indiana	1
7	Tennessee Tech	0
5	Southeast Missouri State	10^{(6)}
8	Western Illinois	2

Second round
3	SIU Edwardsville	9^{(6)}
6	Southern Indiana	1
4	Lindenwood	2
5	Southeast Missouri State	5
Lower third round
4	Lindenwood	2
2	UT Martin	0
6	Southern Indiana	4
5	Southeast Missouri State	7

Third round
2	UT Martin	0
3	SIU Edwardsville	3
1	Eastern Illinois	7
5	Southeast Missouri State	6
Lower semifinal
4	Lindenwood	3^{(9)}
5	Southeast Missouri State	2

Semifinals
3	SIU Edwardsville	0
1	Eastern Illinois	8
Lower final
3	SIU Edwardsville	5
4	Lindenwood	13

Final
1	Eastern Illinois	0	5
4	Lindenwood	5	2

== All Tournament Team ==
Player	Team
**Karlie McKenzie**	Eastern Illinois
Bryanna French	Eastern Illinois
Abbi Hatton	Eastern Illinois
Sophia Olman	Eastern Illinois
Kylee Crowder	Lindenwood
Tori Hatton	Lindenwood
Avery Wapp	Lindenwood
Kaylin Fahy	SIU Edwardsville
Aidyn Barrera	SIU Edwardsville
Madison Winkler	Southeast Missouri State
Karena Recrosio	UT Martin
Kylie Witthaus	Southern Indiana

MVP in bold
