= 2026 Big West Conference softball tournament =

College softball tournament in California

- Teams: 6
- Format: Double-elimination tournament
- Finals site: Anderson Family Field; Fullerton, California
- Champions: Cal State Fullerton (1st title)
- Winning coach: Gina Oaks Garcia (1st title)
- MVP: Leanna Garcia (Cal State Fullerton)
- Television: ESPN+

2026 Big West Conference softball standings
	Conf.				Overall
Team	W		L	PCT	W		L	PCT
Cal State Fullerton ‍†‍‡‍^{y}	24	–	3	.889	40	–	13	.755
Hawaii ‍‍‍	21	–	6	.778	30	–	20	.600
UC Santa Barbara ‍‍‍	18	–	9	.667	31	–	26	.544
UC Davis ‍‍‍	17	–	10	.630	29	–	25	.537
Long Beach State ‍‍‍	17	–	10	.630	31	–	23	.574
UC San Diego ‍‍‍	12	–	15	.444	23	–	28	.451
Cal State Northridge ‍‍‍	9	–	18	.333	14	–	32	.304
Cal State Bakersfield ‍‍‍	8	–	19	.296	10	–	40	.200
Cal Poly ‍‍‍	5	–	22	.185	11	–	35	.239
UC Riverside ‍‍‍	4	–	23	.148	6	–	38	.136
† – Conference champion ‡ – Tournament champion y – Invited to the NCAA tournament As of May 9, 2026; Rankings from NFCA/USA Today

The 2026 Big West Conference softball tournament was held at Anderson Family Field on the campus of the California State University, Fullerton in Fullerton, California from May 6 through May 9, 2026. The tournament was won by the Cal State Fullerton Titans, who earned the Big West Conference's automatic bid to the 2026 NCAA Division I softball tournament.

== Format and seeding ==
The top six finishers of the league's ten teams from the regular season qualified for the tournament. The top two seeds received a single bye, with the remaining teams playing opening round games.

== Tournament ==
=== Bracket ===
Upper round 1	Upper round 2	Upper final	Final
1	Cal State Fullerton	4
4	UC Davis	5	4	UC Davis	0
5	Long Beach State	3	1	Cal State Fullerton	6
2	Hawaii	4
2	Hawaii	2
3	UC Santa Barbara	10^{(9)}	3	UC Santa Barbara	0
6	UC San Diego	9
1	Cal State Fullerton	1	—
3	UC Santa Barbara	0	—
Lower round 1	Lower round 2	Lower round 3	Lower final
2	Hawaii	6
3	UC Santa Barbara	13	3	UC Santa Barbara	8
4	UC Davis	1	5	Long Beach State	10
5	Long Beach State	5	5	Long Beach State	6
6	UC San Diego	4

== All Tournament Team ==
Player	Team
Arce Ava	Cal State Fullerton
**Leanna Garcia**	Cal State Fullerton
Eva Hurtado	Cal State Fullerton
Trisha McCleskey	Cal State Fullerton
Colby McClinton	Cal State Fullerton
Sarah Perez	Cal State Fullerton
Kate Barnett	Long Beach State
Priscilla Iniguez	Long Beach State
Brooklyn Lee	Long Beach State
Nina Sepulveda	Long Beach State
Giselle Mejia	UC Santa Barbara
Ainsley Waddell	UC Santa Barbara
Carys Murakami	Hawaii

MVP in bold
