= North Alabama Lions softball =

Women's college softball team

North Alabama Lions Softball
- Founded: 1983 (43 years ago)
- University: University of North Alabama
- Athletic director: Dr.Josh Looney
- All-time Record: 906–789–1 (.534)
- Head coach: Ashley Cozart (10th season)
- Conference: UAC
- Location: Florence, Alabama
- Home stadium: Hilda B. Anderson Softball Stadium (capacity: 4,200)
- Nickname: Lions
- Colors: Purple and gold

NCAA Tournament champions
- Division II; 2016

NCAA WCWS appearances
- Division II; 2016

NCAA super regional appearances
- Division II; 2016

NCAA Tournament appearances
- Division II; 2006, 2013, 2014, 2015, 2016, 2017, 2018

Conference tournament championships
- Gulf South; 1986, 1987, 2016, 2018

Regular-season conference championships
- Gulf South; 2016, 2018

The North Alabama Lions softball team represents the University of North Alabama in NCAA Division I College softball. The team competes in the United Athletic Conference, and plays its home games at Hilda B. Anderson Softball Stadium in Florence, Alabama. The Lions are currently led by head coach Ashley Cozart.

North Alabama has won their conference title 4 times, has been to the NCAA Division II Tournament 7 times and has won the one NCAA Division II Softball Championship in 2016.

== History ==
North Alabama began official play in 1983 after a year of exhibition play and was led by head coach Ande Jones. From 1983 to 1985, the Lions and the rest of the Gulf South Conference competed in slow-pitch softball. In 1985, the GSC and the Lions switched to fast pitch and made the jump to Division II play. The Lions would win the first two GSC championships under fast pitch rules, beating Mississippi College both times.

Success continued for the Lions into the 1990s. Michele Logan would be picked to the All-GSC team three times while Jodi Johnson would become a four-time All-GSC performer in 1999. From 2000 to 2004, the Lions would have 118-151 record before returning to the GSC tournament in 2005.

In 2006, the Lions made their first ever appearance in the NCAA Division II Tournament. They would go 1-2 in tournament play after losing to FGCU and Barry and beating Kentucky State.

From 2013 to 2018, the Lions made 6 straight NCAA Division II tournaments. In 2016, North Alabama won their first GSC title in 29 years under the coaching of Ashley Cozart. The Lions would go on to the Division II World Series and beat Humboldt State to win their first National Championship. The title would be the university's first national title since 2003 when the women's volleyball team took home the Division II championship.

In 2019, the Lions began play in the Atlantic Sun Conference as they made the jump to Division I play. They would finish 26-20 in their first season as a Division I team. In 2022, North Alabama went 40-20 and received an invitation to the NISC and found victory against UNLV and Tarleton State as they finished 2-2 in tournament play.

In 2023, North Alabama made the ASUN Conference tournament finals but lost to Central Arkansas.

== Hilda B. Anderson Softball Complex ==
Hilda B. Anderson Softball Complex
- Interactive map of Hilda B. Anderson Softball Complex
- Former names: Cox Creek Park (2003–2005); UNA Softball Complex at Cox Creek Park (2006–2018)
- Location: Florence, Alabama
- Coordinates: 34°50′24.58″N 87°40′33.39″W

Construction
- Architect: SKT Architects (2006 renovation)
- General contractor: Thompson-Fisher Inc. (2006 renovation)

Tenant
- North Alabama Lions softball (NCAA) (2003–present)

Originally known as the UNA Softball Complex at Cox Creek Park, the Lions have played at the Hilda B. Anderson Softball Complex since 2003. The Lions moved to the site after playing its first twenty years at Veterans Park. In 2006, a $630,000 renovation transformed the field into its current state by adding a new press box, concourse area, and grandstands. Since then, the complex has continued to be improved. In 2010, a new scoreboard was added along with viewing decks in the outfield. In 2023, a new indoor batting facility and fieldhouse was built along the right foul line and in 2024, artificial turf was installed.

In 2019, the field was renamed to the Hilda B. Anderson Softball Complex to honor her commitment to UNA softball as she and her family were and continue to be one of the biggest donors to the program.

== Individual honors and awards ==
This is a list of individual honors at the national and conference levels, including All-Americans.

=== Regional Awards ===
College Sports Communicators Academic All-District

- Georgia Land (2023)
- Sidney Bevis (2023, 2024)
- Hailey Jones (2024)
- Lillyanna Cartee (2024)

=== Conference awards ===
ASUN Pitcher of The Year

- Megan Garst (2019)

ASUN All-Conference First Team

- Megan Garst (2019)
- Emma Broadfoot (2022)
- Alivia Wilken (2024)
- Haven Kriby (2024)

ASUN All-Conference Second Team

- Veronica Westfall (2019)
- Harley Stokes (2022)
- Georgia Land (2022, 2023)
- Briley Dover (2024)
- Felicity Frame (2024)

ASUN All-Conference Third Team

- Hailey Jones (2023, 2024)

ASUN All-Freshman Team

- Lexie Harper (2019)
- Emma Broadfoot (2021)
- Hailey Jones (2022)
- Briley Dover (2024)

ASUN All-Academic Team

- Alex Brown (2019)
- Emma Broadfoot (2021)
- Sidney Beavis (2024)
- Hailey Jones (2024)

=== National awards ===
D2CCA Ron Lenz National Player of the Year

- Brooklynn Clark (2016)

NFCA National Coaching Staff of The Year

- Ashley Cozart (2016)
- Whitney Hawkins (2016)

NCAA Elite 90 Award

- Amy Carden (2016)

HERO Sports First-Team All-American

- Brooklynn Clark (2016)

D2CCA First-Team All-American

- Brooklynn Clark (2016)
- Anna Gayle Norris (2016)

NFCA First-Team All-American

- Brooklynn Clark (2016)

D2CCA Third-Team All-American

- Megan Garst (2018)

NFCA Second-Team All-American

- Jessica Liddy (2006)
- Megan Garst (2018)

NFCA Third-Team All-American

- Kara Brewer (2018)

HERO Sports Fan's Choice Award

- Brooklynn Clark (2016)

College Sports Communicators Academic All-American of The Year

- Kristy Holdbrooks (1993)

College Sports Communicators First-Team Academic All-American

- Kristy Holdbrooks (1993)

College Sports Communicators Second-Team Academic All-American

- Harlie Barkley (2016)

=== Conference awards ===
GSC Coach of The Year

- Ande Jones (1986)
- Ashley Cozart (2016, 2018)

GSC Commissioner's Trophy

- Kristy Holdbrooks (1993)

GSC East Freshman of The Year

- Lindsey Greene (2005)
