= Quinnipiac Bobcats softball =

College softball team

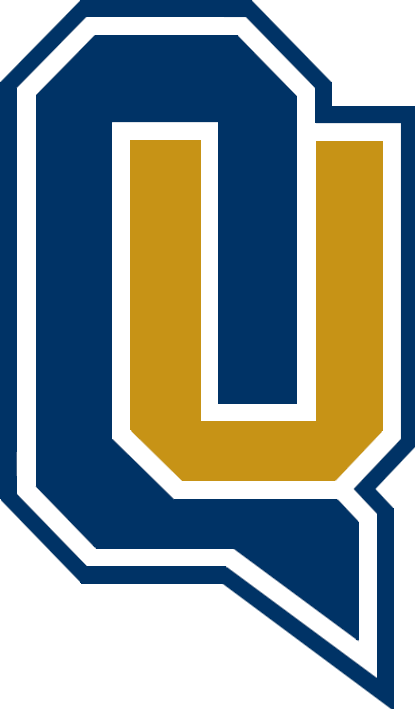
- University: Quinnipiac University
- Head coach: Hillary Smith (8th season)
- Conference: The Metro
- Location: Hamden, Connecticut, US
- Home stadium: Quinnipiac Softball Field
- Nickname: Bobcats
- Colors: Navy and gold

Regular-season conference championships
- 1996* *at Division II level

The Quinnipiac Bobcats softball team represents Quinnipiac University in NCAA Division I college softball. The team participates in the Metro Atlantic Athletic Conference (MAAC), having joined in 2014. From 1988 until 1998, Quinnipiac was a member of the Northeast-10 Conference (NE-10) at the Division II level. The program transitioned to Division I in 1999, joining the Northeast Conference (NEC) where they were a member until 2013. The Bobcats are currently led by head coach Hillary Smith. The team plays its home games at Quinnipiac Softball Field, which is located on the college's campus.

== History ==
The Bobcats had some success as an NCAA Division II program, winning the Northeast-10 Conference regular season title in 1996. The team won two individual awards in the NE-10, with coach Frank Kafka winning NE-10 Coach of the Year in 1994 and Alicia Longobardi winning Freshman of the Year in 1996. After the 1998 season, the athletic program transitioned to NCAA Division I.

Since transitioning to Division I in 1999, Quinnipiac has failed to win either a conference regular season title or a conference tournament championship. In doing so, the Bobcats have also failed to reach the NCAA Division I softball tournament. Quinnipiac has finished as high as second in the Northeast Conference standings twice, doing so under coach Germaine Fairchild in the 2004 and 2012 seasons.

Fairchild was replaced by Jill Karwoski on August 26, 2013. Fairchild's firing became the subject of a lawsuit carried out by the former coach against the university, citing a violation of Title IX. A previous lawsuit had been filed in 2009 against the university after the school had announced the elimination of several sports, notably women's volleyball, and the addition of a Division I cheerleading team. Fairchild's lawsuit claimed that she was fired after testifying at the preliminary injunction hearing related to the 2009 lawsuit, which she was subpoenaed to testify as a witness. The hearing took place three weeks before Fairchild was fired on July 11, 2013. A federal judge ruled against Quinnipiac's motion to dismiss Fairchild's claim on June 13, 2014.

After spending the first 15 years of their time in Division I in the NEC, it was announced in 2012 that the Bobcats would be leaving to join the Metro Atlantic Athletic Conference starting in the 2013–14 academic year.

=== Coaching history ===
Years	Coach	Record	%
1988–1998	Frank Kafka	258–197–3	.567
1999–2000	Maribeth Clifford	40–42	.488
2001–2013	Germaine Fairchild	276–322–1	.462
2013–2018	Jill Karwoski	117–188	.384
2019–present	Hillary Smith	95–176	.351

== Roster ==
2024 Quinnipiac Bobcats roster
Pitchers: 54 – Jaclyn Gonzalez – Junior; 12 – Lauren Hilliard – Freshman; 1 – Sydney Horan – Junior; 20 – Tori McGraw – Junior; 17 – Taylor Walton – Junior; 22 – Julia Woeste – Senior; Catchers: 11 – Mac Davis – Sophomore; 9 – Hannah Davis – Graduate Student; 42 – Kennedy Demott – Sophomore; 10 – Amanda Engel – Junior; 38 – Abby LaClair – Freshman; 20 – Riley Potter – Freshman; 26 – Sydney Rosenkranz – Freshman	Infielders: 27 – Natalia Apatiga – Sophomore; 14 – Ashley Garcia – Freshman; 44 – Brooke Hilliard – Junior; 5 – Ella McGalliard –Junior; 2 – Sofia Vega – Sophomore; Outfielders: 4 – Mary Fogg – Sophomore; 23 – Ally Hochstadter – Sophomore; 16 – Gianna Palmisano – Senior; 3 – Noelle Reid – Sophomore; 34 – Karolyn Walker – Senior; Utility: 12 – Bridget Nasir – Graduate Student; 24 – Jaelyn Gonzalez – Freshman

== Season-by-season results ==
Record table
Season	Coach	Overall	Conference	Standing	Postseason
Quinnipiac Bobcats (Northeast-10 Conference) (1988–1998)
1988	Frank Kafka	23–23	10–6	4th	
1989	Frank Kafka	17–21	8–8	T–5th	
1990	Frank Kafka	25–18	10–8	4th	
1991	Frank Kafka	19–22	10–8	5th	
1992	Frank Kafka	18–16	9–9	5th	
1993	Frank Kafka	18–19	12–6	3rd	
1994	Frank Kafka	30–20	11–7	4th	
1995	Frank Kafka	33–11–1	15–3	3rd	
1996	Frank Kafka	30–15	13–3	1st	
1997	Frank Kafka	24–13	12–6	T–4th	
1998	Frank Kafka	21–19–2	13–6–1	4th	
Quinnipiac Bobcats (Northeast Conference) (1999–2013)
1999	Maribeth Clifford	23–21	9–9	6th	
2000	Maribeth Clifford	17–21	10–10	T–6th	
2001	Germaine Fairchild	17–26	10–12	8th	
2002	Germaine Fairchild	16–22	9–11	7th	
2003	Germaine Fairchild	34–19	13–8	3rd	
2004	Germaine Fairchild	23–28	16–4	2nd	
2005	Germaine Fairchild	19–29–1	12–8	4th	
2006	Germaine Fairchild	19–37	11–8	5th	
2007	Germaine Fairchild	18–27	12–6	4th	
2008	Germaine Fairchild	20–36	5–13	8th	
2009	Germaine Fairchild	18–30	8–10	6th	
2010	Germaine Fairchild	28–24	15–5	3rd	
2011	Germaine Fairchild	32–26	13–7	4th	
2012	Germaine Fairchild	32–18	13–7	T–2nd	
2013	Jill Karwoski	16–34	9–11	8th	
Quinnipiac Bobcats (Metro Atlantic Athletic Conference) (2014–present)
2014	Jill Karwoski	11–36	6–14	9th	
2015	Jill Karwoski	17–33	8–12	8th	
2016	Jill Karwoski	28–29	11–9	6th	
2017	Jill Karwoski	23–27	9–11	9th	
2018	Jill Karwoski	22–29	9–11	T–6th	
2019	Hillary Smith	17–33	8–12	8th	
2020	Hillary Smith	2–9	0–0	N/A	Season cut short due to COVID-19 pandemic
2021	Hillary Smith	8–28	8–28	10th	
2022	Hillary Smith	12–29	5–15	11th	
2023	Hillary Smith	17–25	5–15	10th	
2024	Hillary Smith	20–25	9–15	9th	
2025	Hillary Smith	19–27	14–11	7th	
2026	Hillary Smith	0–0	0–0	5th	
Total:		786–925–4 (.459)			
National champion Postseason invitational champion Conference regular season champion Conference regular season and conference tournament champion Division regular season champion Division regular season and conference tournament champion Conference tournament champion

== See also ==
- List of NCAA Division I softball programs
