= Marist Red Foxes softball =

College softball team

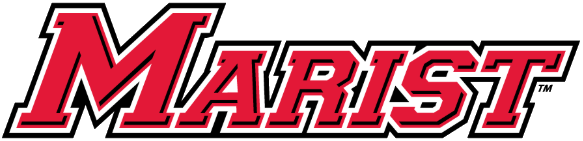
- University: Marist University
- Head coach: Joe Ausanio (16th season)
- Conference: MAAC
- Location: Poughkeepsie, New York, US
- Home stadium: Softball Park at Gartland Athletic Field
- Nickname: Red Foxes
- Colors: Red and white

NCAA Tournament appearances
- 1996, 2006, 2013, 2016, 2023, 2025, 2026

Conference tournament championships
- NEC: 1996; MAAC: 2006, 2013, 2016, 2023, 2025, 2026

Regular-season conference championships
- NEC: 1995, 1996; MAAC: 2014, 2016, 2019, 2024, 2025, 2026

For information on all Marist University sports, see Marist Red Foxes

The Marist Red Foxes softball team represents Marist University in college softball for NCAA Division I. The team participates in the Metro Atlantic Athletic Conference (MAAC). From 1992 until 1997, the team was a member of the Northeast Conference (NEC). The Red Foxes are currently led by head coach Joe Ausanio. The team plays its home games at Softball Park at Gartland Athletic Field, which is located on the university's campus.

== History ==
Marist has won four MAAC championships, all of which advanced them to the NCAA Division I Softball Championship (2006, 2013, 2016, & 2023). They have also won the NEC Tournament championship in 1996, which advanced them to the play-in round of the 1996 NCAA Division I softball tournament.

Marist made their first regional tournament appearance in 2006 after losing in two games to UMass in the play-in round in 1996. They faced Arizona in their first game, losing by a score of 9–0. They were eliminated from the tournament after losing to Auburn by a score of 14–0, failing to score a run in their first NCAA Tournament appearance.

The Red Foxes fell to the #1 ranked and eventual National Champion Oklahoma in their first game of the 2013 NCAA Tournament by a score of 17–0. Kyrsten Van Natta recorded the only hit of the game for the Red Foxes. The Red Foxes were ultimately eliminated from the 2013 NCAA Tournament when they lost 5–3 to Fordham.

In 2016, the Red Foxes returned to the NCAA tournament after a record-breaking season. With 45 wins, Marist set a new MAAC record for most wins in a single season. The Red Foxes went on to play #13 ranked Tennessee in the Knoxville Regional. The Red Foxes jumped out to a first inning lead on a two-run home run hit by Rebecca Freeman, however the Lady Vols scored 10 unanswered runs and defeated the Red Foxes by a score of 10–2. Marist's time in the tournament came to an end after losing its second game of the regional to Ohio State by a final score of 6–1.

In 2023, Marist qualified for their first NCAA tournament in seven years after defeating top-seeded Canisius in the MAAC championship game by a score of 2–1. In their first game of the tournament, the team was no-hit by Florida State and lost via the mercy rule by a score of 9–0 in five innings. The Red Foxes were eliminated from the tournament by South Carolina by a score of 2–1.

=== Coaching history ===
| Years | Coach | Record | % |
|---|---|---|---|
| 1992–1994 | Tom Chiavelli | 35–57 | .380 |
| 1994–2001 | Jonnah O’Donnell | 194–131–3 | .596 |
| 2002–2006 | Melissa Tucci | 87–144–1 | .377 |
| 2007–2008 | Erin Layton | 44–60 | .423 |
| 2009–present | Joe Ausanio | 479–391–1 | .551 |

== Roster ==
2024 Marist Red Foxes roster
| Pitchers: 22 – Stella Blanchard – Freshman; 12 – Isabella Milazzo – Junior; 31 – Kiley Myers – Graduate Student; 15 – Maddie Pleasants – Junior; 2 – Anna Sidlowski – Freshman; Catchers: 55 – Rowan Drew – Freshman; 13 – Isabella Manory – Sophomore | Infielders: 18 – Ronni Howard – Junior; 8 – Samantha Rogers – Freshman; Outfielders: 5 – Taylor Anderson – Freshman; 34 – Kaitlyn Husic – Junior; 3 – Peyton Pusey – Sophomore; 33 – Sophia Recrosio – Graduate Student; Utility: 25 – Haley Ahr – Redshirt Sophomore; 10 – Maddie Gore – Junior; 4 – Alyssa Grupp – Senior; 11 – Miah McDonald – Senior; 7 – Lauren Morrell – Junior |

== Season-by-season results ==
Record table
| Season | Coach | Overall | Conference | Standing | Postseason |
|---|---|---|---|---|---|
Marist Red Foxes (Northeast Conference) (1992–1997)
| 1992 | Tom Chiavelli | 4–29 | 1–7 | N/A | |
| 1993 | Tom Chiavelli | 22–22 | 4–6 | N/A | |
| 1994 | Tom Chiavelli/George Burgin/Jonnah O’Donnell | 28–16 | 10–2 | N/A | |
| 1995 | Jonnah O’Donnell | 33–12–1 | 13–12–1 | N/A | |
| 1996 | Jonnah O’Donnell | 28–14 | 13–3 | N/A | NCAA Play–In |
| 1997 | Jonnah O’Donnell | 23–21 | 12–8 | N/A | |
Marist Red Foxes (Metro Atlantic Athletic Conference) (1998–present)
| 1998 | Jonnah O’Donnell | 20–13–1 | 10–6 | N/A | |
| 1999 | Jonnah O’Donnell | 16–21 | 7–9 | T–6th | |
| 2000 | Jonnah O’Donnell | 30–16 | 9–7 | T–5th | |
| 2001 | Jonnah O’Donnell | 25–24–1 | 11–5 | T–2nd | |
| 2002 | Melissa Tucci | 10–35–1 | 4–12 | 18th | |
| 2003 | Melissa Tucci | 10–31 | 7–9 | 5th | |
| 2004 | Melissa Tucci | 11–43 | 4–12 | 9th | |
| 2005 | Melissa Tucci | 23–22 | 9–7 | T–4th | |
| 2006 | Melissa Tucci | 33–13 | 12–4 | 2nd | NCAA Regionals |
| 2007 | Erin Layton | 20–30 | 9–7 | 4th | |
| 2008 | Erin Layton | 24–30 | 8–8 | 4th | |
| 2009 | Joe Ausanio | 16–33 | 9–7 | T–3rd | |
| 2010 | Joe Ausanio | 10–35 | 4–12 | 8th | |
| 2011 | Joe Ausanio | 33–22 | 12–4 | T–2nd | |
| 2012 | Joe Ausanio | 28–27 | 9–7 | 4th | |
| 2013 | Joe Ausanio | 30–26 | 10–6 | 3rd | NCAA Regionals |
| 2014 | Joe Ausanio | 27–24 | 16–4 | T–6th | |
| 2015 | Joe Ausanio | 28–26 | 11–9 | 7th | |
| 2016 | Joe Ausanio | 45–17 | 16–4 | 1st | NCAA Regionals |
| 2017 | Joe Ausanio | 37–22 | 13–7 | T–3rd | |
| 2018 | Joe Ausanio | 27–32 | 9–11 | T–6th | |
| 2019 | Joe Ausanio | 35–22 | 16–4 | 1st | |
| 2020 | Joe Ausanio | 10–9 | 0–0 | N/A | Season cut short due to COVID-19 pandemic |
| 2021 | Joe Ausanio | 15–12 | 12–10 | 8th | |
| 2022 | Joe Ausanio | 25–30 | 11–10 | 5th | |
| 2023 | Joe Ausanio | 29–30 | 12–8 | 3rd | NCAA Regionals |
| 2024 | Joe Ausanio | 36–19 | 17–6 | 1st | |
| 2025 | Joe Ausanio | 48–9–1 | 21–2–1 | 1st | NCAA Regionals |
| 2026 | Joe Ausanio | 0–0 | 0–0 | | |
| Total: | | 839–787–5 (.516) | | | |
National champion Postseason invitational champion Conference regular season champion Conference regular season and conference tournament champion Division regular season champion Division regular season and conference tournament champion Conference tournament champion

== See also ==
- List of NCAA Division I softball programs
