= Niagara Purple Eagles softball =

College softball team

Niagara Purple Eagles
- University: Niagara University
- Head coach: Craig Leone (1st season)
- Conference: MAAC
- Location: Lewiston, New York, US
- Home stadium: Niagara Softball Field
- Nickname: Purple Eagles
- Colors: Purple and white

NCAA Tournament appearances
- 1998

Conference tournament championships
- 1998

The Niagara Purple Eagles softball team represents Niagara University in the NCAA Division I college softball. The team participates in the Metro Atlantic Athletic Conference (MAAC). The Purple Eagles are currently led by head coach Paul. The team plays its home games at Niagara Softball Field located on the university's campus.

== History ==
Since joining the Metro Atlantic Athletic Conference in 1990, Niagara has failed to win a conference regular season title but have managed to finish second three times, doing so in 1996, 1997, and 2008. The Purple Eagles have been largely unsuccessful since establishing a team in 1981. Niagara has posted a winning season only seven times in 41 years, six of those with former coach Al Dirschberger. The most recent winning season came in 2009. They have, however, managed to win a conference tournament title, doing so in 1998. In doing so, Niagara earned a berth in the 1998 NCAA Division I softball tournament.

The Purple Eagles, led by stars Joni Sontrop and Kelly Cruttenden, faced off against Arizona in their first career NCAA tournament appearance, losing 14-0 via mercy rule in five innings. Niagara were eliminated in their second and final game of the tournament, losing 5-1 to Hawaii.

Former head coach Al Dirschberger was convicted of raping a 28 year old woman in 2017 and was sentenced to 5 years in prison. He was released in 2023 and will be under probation for ten years.

=== Coaching history ===
Years	Coach	Record	%
1981–1982	Bill Gould	17–19	.472
1983–1987	Beth Corcoran	46–58–2	.443
1988–1989	Beth Bullock	16–39–2	.298
1990	Gerilyn Proto	7–21	.250
1991–2012	Al Dirschberger	345–488	.414
2013	Ellie Chan	16–30	.348
2014–2025	Larry Puzan	172–341	.335
2026–present	Paul Gray	8–34	.190

== Roster ==
2027 Niagara Purple Eagles roster
Pitchers: 99 – Gianna Graber – Sophomore; 33 – Ryan Hatty – Sophomore; 29 – Jenna Martin – Junior; 2 – Carmella Phelan – Sophomore; 11 – Abbey Steen – Junior; 21 – Grace Szpylman – Junior; 19 – Kiri Weidner – Freshman; Catchers: 00 – Emily Fuchs – Freshman; 24 – Adriana Hills – Sophomore; 10 – Kelli Plumaker – Sophomore; 77 – Gabby Sperduto – Freshman; Outfielders: 5 – Alessandra Carter – Sophomore; 16 – Ella Fowler – Sophomore; 6 – CJ Haney – Junior; 14 – Emily Peterson – Junior; 15 – Ella Royster – Freshman; 1 – Layla Weaver – Junior	Infielders: 22 – Charlee Bauer – Freshman; 9 – Sophia Chemotti – Sophomore; 44 – Emma Hurley – Freshman; 7 – Ella Moore – Sophomore; 12 – Ashlyn Pignone – Sophomore; 52 – Abigail Ras – Sophomore; 20 – Cassidy Weller – Junior

== Season-by-season results ==
Record table
Season	Coach	Overall	Conference	Standing	Postseason
Niagara Purple Eagles (America East Conference) (1981–1989)
1981	Bill Gould	7–9			
1982	Bill Gould	10–10			
1983	Beth Corcoran	10–12			
1984	Beth Corcoran	13–5			
1985	Beth Corcoran	8–9–1			
1986	Beth Corcoran	11–18–1			
1987	Beth Corcoran	4–14			
1988	Beth Bullock	5–24–2			
1989	Beth Bullock	11–15			
Niagara Purple Eagles (Metro Atlantic Athletic Conference) (1990–present)
1990	Gerilyn Proto	7–21	N/A	8th	
1991	Al Dirschberger	4–20	1–9	5th	
1992	Al Dirschberger	5–19	0–5	5th	
1993	Al Dirschberger	4–32	1–9	5th	
1994	Al Dirschberger	10–18	4–8	N/A	
1995	Al Dirschberger	15–19	4–8	N/A	
1996	Al Dirschberger	17–17	7–5	2nd	
1997	Al Dirschberger	23–15	8–4	2nd	
1998	Al Dirschberger	22–19	10–6	3rd	NCAA Regionals
1999	Al Dirschberger	10–23	7–9	5th	
2000	Al Dirschberger	22–15	10–6	3rd	
2001	Al Dirschberger	12–20	7–9	7th	
2002	Al Dirschberger	8–32	3–13	9th	
2003	Al Dirschberger	7–27	6–10	6th	
2004	Al Dirschberger	20–26	8–8	6th	
2005	Al Dirschberger	12–29	2–13	9th	
2006	Al Dirschberger	24–23	6–10	6th	
2007	Al Dirschberger	18–20	10–6	3rd	
2008	Al Dirschberger	27–21	13–3	2nd	
2009	Al Dirschberger	30–19	9–7	3rd	
2010	Al Dirschberger	22–22	9–7	3rd	
2011	Al Dirschberger	18–22	6–10	7th	
2012	Al Dirschberger	15–30	7–9	7th	
2013	Ellie Chan	16–30	9–7	4th	
2014	Larry Puzan	18–30	8–12	7th	
2015	Larry Puzan	4–40	4–16	10th	
2016	Larry Puzan	10–38	8–12	8th	
2017	Larry Puzan	19–26	10–10	7th	
2018	Larry Puzan	16–33	8–12	8th	
2019	Larry Puzan	18–32	11–9	5th	
2020	Larry Puzan	3–7	0–0	N/A	Season cut short due to COVID-19 pandemic
2021	Larry Puzan	11–19	11–19	9th	
2022	Larry Puzan	14–26	8–12	9th	
2023	Larry Puzan	9–34	3–17	11th	
2024	Larry Puzan	29–21	16–7	2nd	
2025	Larry Puzan	10–30	7–16	10th	
2026	Paul Gray	8–34	5–22	12th	
Total:		618–1,044–4 (.372)			
National champion Postseason invitational champion Conference regular season champion Conference regular season and conference tournament champion Division regular season champion Division regular season and conference tournament champion Conference tournament champion

As of May 8, 2026.

== See also ==
- List of NCAA Division I softball programs
