= Fairfield Stags softball =

College softball team

Fairfield Stags
- University: Fairfield University
- Head coach: Julie Brzezinski (30th season)
- Conference: MAAC
- Location: Fairfield, Connecticut, US
- Home stadium: Alumni Softball Field
- Nickname: Stags
- Colors: Red

NCAA Tournament appearances
- 2015, 2017

Conference tournament championships
- 1991, 2015, 2017

Regular-season conference championships
- 1991, 2002, 2003, 2004, 2009, 2011, 2013, 2015

For information on all Fairfield University sports, see Fairfield Stags

The Fairfield Stags softball team represents Fairfield University in NCAA Division I college softball. The team participates in the Metro Atlantic Athletic Conference (MAAC). The Stags are currently led by head coach Julie Brzezinski. The team plays its home games at Alumni Softball Field, which opened in 1999 and is located on the college's campus.

== History ==
Fairfield ranks tied for third in MAAC Tournament championships among active members with Marist at three, trailing only Canisius and Iona, who have 12 and six titles respectively. The Stags qualified for the NCAA Division I softball tournament for the first time in 2015 where they were placed in the Tuscaloosa Regional. They were eliminated after two games without scoring a run, losing via mercy rule to both Alabama and USC Upstate by a combined score of 17–0. Fairfield made their second appearance in the NCAA tournament in 2017. They were placed in the Baton Rouge regional and were defeated by LSU in their opening game after leading early, 2–1. They were eliminated from the tournament by McNeese State by a score of 6–2.

Head coach Julie Brzezinski won her 900th career game on February 17, 2023. During her tenure with Fairfield, Brzezinski has been named MAAC Coach of the Year three times, sharing the award with Iona coach Andrea Farquhar in 2002 and winning it outright in 2004 and 2012. By winning the award in 2002, she joined former Fairfield coaches Bob Zito and Bob Conlan in winning the award, with Zito winning in 1991 and Conlan in 1997. As of 2023, Brzezinski ranks 41st all-time in NCAA Division I history in career wins as a coach.

=== Coaching history ===
Years	Coach	Record	%
1982–1984	Bruce Lazar	24–41	.329
1985–92	Bob Zito	126–145–1	.465
1993–1994	Andrea Costa	25–47–1	.349
1995–1997	Patricia Conlan	54–89	.378
1998–present	Julie Brzezinski	897–978–7	.478

== Roster ==
2026 Fairfield Stags roster
Pitchers: 12 – Grace Conrad – Sophomore; 20 – Chela Kovar – Junior; 14 – Delaney Moquin – Freshman; 24 – Mia Simon – Freshman; 1 – Peyton Shields – Junior; 8 – Alyssa Weinberg – Senior; Catchers: 6 – Ava Armuth – Sophomore; 7 – Olivia Moeckel – Freshman; 22 – Delaney Whieldon – Senior; Outfielders: 9 – Quinn McGonigle – Senior; 13 – SJ Mull – Graduate Student; 15 – Lauren Osland – Freshman; 10 – Danica Silvestri – Junior; 2 – Caroline Walls – Sophomore; 5 – Darby Weller – Junior	Infielders: 17 – Sarah Bielski – Freshman; 3 – Sammie Dougherty – Freshman; 11 – Martina Gutierrez – Senior; 19 – Cara Kochakian – Senior; 16 – Natalia LoCurto – Junior; 23 – Alivia Macaluso – Redshirt Senior; 18 – Emma Marchese – Sophomore; 21 – Anna Paravati – Senior; 4 – Evelyn Wozniak – Sophomore

== Season-by-season results ==
Record table
Season	Coach	Overall	Conference	Standing	Postseason
Fairfield Stags (Metro Atlantic Athletic Conference) (1982–present)
1982	Bruce Lazar	6–17			
1983	Bruce Lazar	10–10			
1984	Bruce Lazar	8–14			
1985	Bob Zito	16–12			
1986	Bob Zito	16–15			
1987	Bob Zito	14–14		4th	
1988	Bob Zito	22–15		3rd	
1989	Bob Zito	17–21–1		2nd	
1990	Bob Zito	16–28		3rd	
1991	Bob Zito	16–18		1st	
1992	Bob Zito	9–22		6th	
1993	Andrea Costa	14–19–1		6th	
1994	Andrea Costa	11–28		2nd	
1995	Patricia Conlan	10–33		4th	
1996	Patricia Conlan	15–28			
1997	Patricia Conlan	29–28		4th	
1998	Julie Brzezinski	29–26		2nd	
1999	Julie Brzezinski	26–30	10–6	3rd	
2000	Julie Brzezinski	27–28	10–6	2nd	
2001	Julie Brzezinski	36–22–1	11–5	3rd	
2002	Julie Brzezinski	32–27–2	13–3	1st	
2003	Julie Brzezinski	28–35	12–4	1st	
2004	Julie Brzezinski	29–33	12–4	1st	
2005	Julie Brzezinski	31–27–1	10–6	2nd	
2006	Julie Brzezinski	32–27–1	8–8	4th	
2007	Julie Brzezinski	20–24	7–9	6th	
2008	Julie Brzezinski	21–28	9–7	3rd	
2009	Julie Brzezinski	21–28	11–5	1st	
2010	Julie Brzezinski	24–22	8–8	5th	
2011	Julie Brzezinski	31–22	13–3	1st	
2012	Julie Brzezinski	31–27	11–5	2nd	
2013	Julie Brzezinski	29–21	12–4	1st	
2014	Julie Brzezinski	20–22	15–5	2nd	
2015	Julie Brzezinski	25–24	15–5	2nd	NCAA Regionals
2016	Julie Brzezinski	27–23	12–8	5th	
2017	Julie Brzezinski	26–28	11–9	5th	NCAA Regionals
2018	Julie Brzezinski	27–26	15–5	2nd	
2019	Julie Brzezinski	26–24	10–10	6th	
2020	Julie Brzezinski	4–11	0–0	N/A	Season cut short due to COVID-19 pandemic
2021	Julie Brzezinski	22–14	20–12	4th	
2022	Julie Brzezinski	25–22	17–5	2nd	
2023	Julie Brzezinski	22–25	11–9	T–4th	
2024	Julie Brzezinski	14–33	10–14	T–7th	
2025	Julie Brzezinski	26–26	18–7	2nd	
2026	Julie Brzezinski	0–0	0–0		
Total:		1,126–1,300–9 (.464)			
National champion Postseason invitational champion Conference regular season champion Conference regular season and conference tournament champion Division regular season champion Division regular season and conference tournament champion Conference tournament champion

== See also ==
- List of NCAA Division I softball programs
