= Harvard Crimson softball =

- Founded: 1981
- University: Harvard University
- Head coach: Jenny Rohn (3rd season)
- Conference: Ivy League
- Location: Cambridge, Massachusetts, US
- Home stadium: Soldiers Field
- Nickname: Crimson
- Colors: Crimson, white, and black

NCAA Tournament appearances
- 1998, 2000, 2007, 2011, 2012, 2018, 2019, 2023

Conference tournament championships
- 2023

Regular-season conference championships
- 1998, 2000, 2001, 2007, 2011, 2012, 2016, 2018, 2019, 2023, 2024

The Harvard Crimson softball is the official team which represents Harvard University in NCAA Division I college softball. The team currently participates in the Ivy League. The Crimson are currently led by their head coach Jenny Allard. The team play home games at Soldiers Field which is located on the university's campus.

== History ==
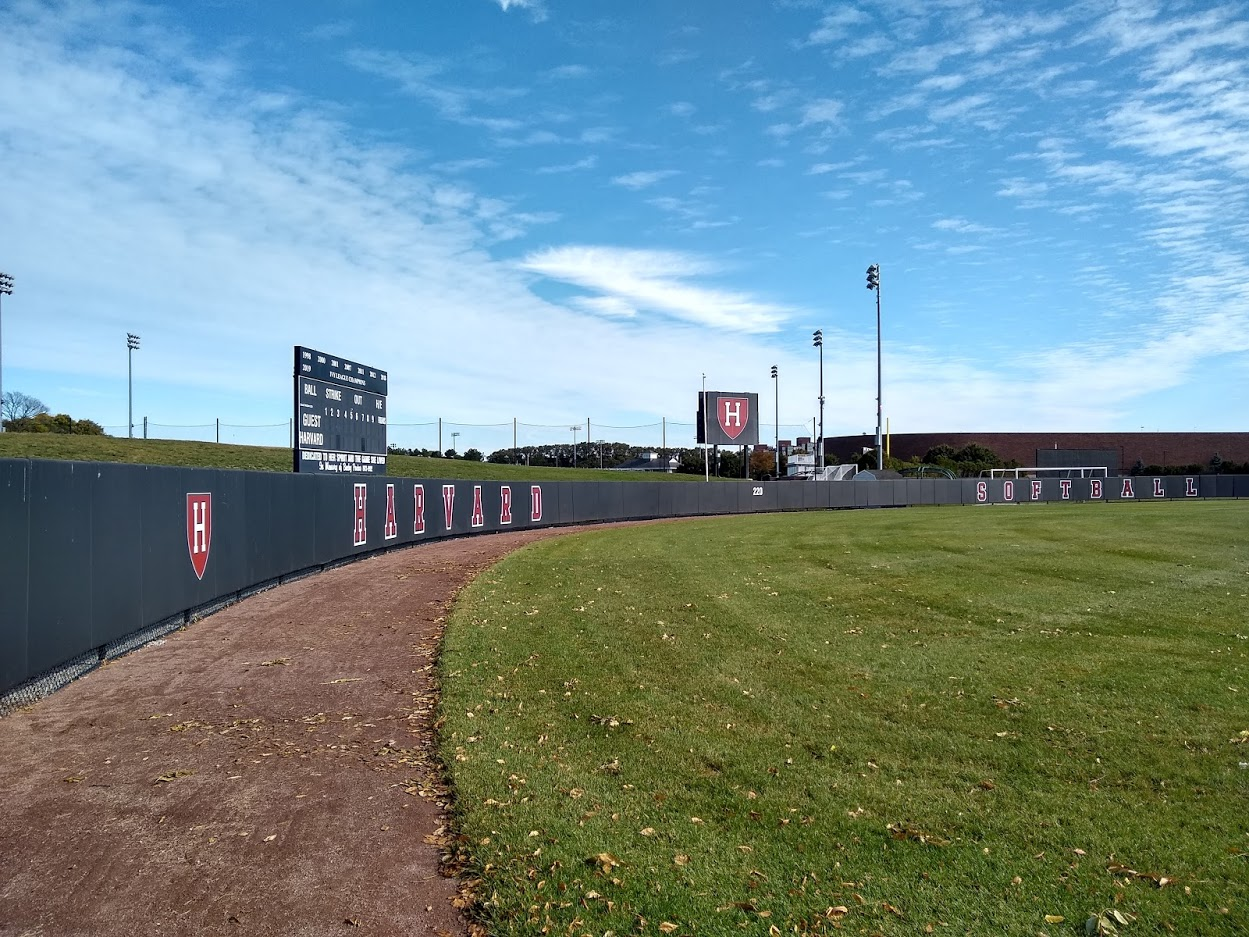
The Harvard Crimson softball outfield.

=== Coaching history ===
Years	Coach	Record	%
1981	Kit Morrow	14-5	.737
1982-1988	John Wentzell	84-57	.596
1989-1994	Barry Haskell	105-118-1	.471
1995-2023	Jenny Allard	635-473-3	.573
2024-Present	Jenny Rohn	0-0	–

== Coaching staff ==
Name	Position coached	Consecutive season in current position
Jenny Rohn	Head coach	1st
Myka Sutherlin	Assistant Coach	1st
Maddy Carpe	Assistant Coach	1st
Melanie Mandell	Assistant Coach	1st
