= Iona Gaels softball =

College softball team

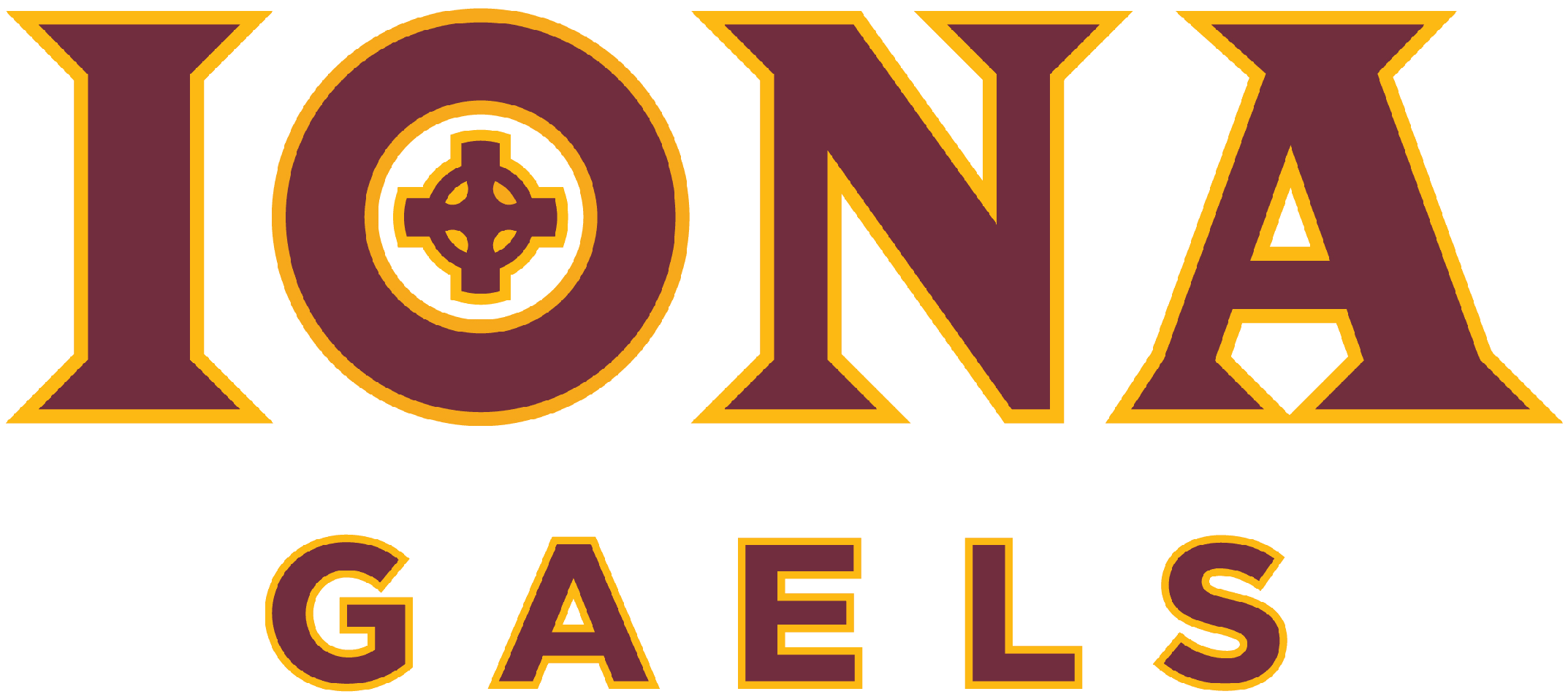
- University: Iona University
- Head coach: Andy Russo (1st season)
- Conference: MAAC
- Location: New Rochelle, New York, US
- Home stadium: Donald E. Walsh Field at Rice Oval (capacity: 300)
- Nickname: Gaels
- Colors: Maroon and gold

NCAA Tournament appearances
- 2010, 2011, 2012, 2014

Conference tournament championships
- 1984, 1985, 2010, 2011, 2012, 2014

Regular-season conference championships
- 2005, 2010, 2012, 2017

For information on all Iona University sports, see Iona Gaels

The Iona Gaels softball team represents Iona University for college softball in NCAA Division I. The team participates in the Metro Atlantic Athletic Conference (MAAC). The Gaels are currently led by head coach Andy Russo. The team plays its home games at the Donald E. Walsh Field at Rice Oval located on the university's campus.

== History ==
The Iona Gaels are an original member of the Metro Atlantic Athletic Conference. The Gaels have managed to win four regular season championships (2005, 2010, 2012 and 2017) and six tournament championships (1984, 1985, 2010, 2011, 2012, and 2014). Iona has qualified for the NCAA Division I softball tournament four times as a result of winning the MAAC tournament, doing so in 2010, 2011, 2012, and 2014.

After defeating Canisius by a score of 4–1 in the 2010 MAAC championship game, Iona qualified for the NCAA tournament for the first time in program history. The Gaels faced off against Texas. The Longhorns defeated Iona by a score of 6–0, the Gaels only managing one hit. Iona was eliminated from the tournament by East Carolina, losing 3–0.

Iona made their second appearance in the 2011 NCAA tournament after defeating Fairfield 4–0. The Gaels faced off against Oklahoma, but were defeated 7–1. Iona was eliminated from the tournament by Missouri State, losing 4–2.

The Gaels qualified for their third consecutive NCAA tournament in 2012 after winning the MAAC championship, once again defeating Fairfield. Iona faced #1 ranked California and were defeated 8–0. They were eliminated from the tournament by Boston University after losing a close 4–3 contest.

Iona's latest appearance in the NCAA tournament came in 2014. The Gaels qualified after defeating Manhattan. The team played Washington in their first game of the tournament, losing 8–0 via the mercy rule in six innings. The Gaels suffered the same fate in their final game and were eliminated from the tournament, losing to Northwestern 14–4 in six innings.

=== Coaching history ===
Years	Coach	Record	%
1984–1999	Linda Glum	7–45 (Note: Records indicate Glum was coach during this time period, but win/loss records are incomplete from 1984 to 1998.)	.135
2000–2007	Andrea Farquhar	146–195–1	.428
2008–2010	Jaime Wohlbach	54–85	.388
2011–2012	Roni Rivera	66–48	.579
2013–2017	Melissa Inouye	93–146	.389
2018–2020	Katie Jansson	40–60	.400
2021–2024	Alyssa Tiumalu	84–98–1	.462
2025	Carla Campagna	29–21	.580
2026–present	Andy Russo	0–0	–

== Roster ==
2024 Iona Gaels roster
Pitchers: 16 – Dani Beckham – Sophomore; 7 – Alyssa DeJianne – Senior; 10 – Maddy Lowry – Junior; 66 – Grace Perez – Freshman; 18 – Samantha Rieb – Senior; Catchers: 13 – Brooke Acker – Sophomore; 28 – Kenadie Gonzalez – Junior; 15 – Jamie Sheeran – Senior; Outfielders: 33 – Madison Campeau – Freshman; 17 – Destiny Nardello – Junior; 1 – Haley Weaver – Senior; 11 – Hannah Werth – Sophomore	Infielders: 23 – Taylor Andolsek – Freshman; 20 – Brianna Bailey – Sophomore; 2 – Emma Capuano – Senior; 22 – Kaylin Flukey – Senior; 4 – Kayla Haywood – Senior; 9 – Alivia Lichtner – Sophomore; 32 – Mary Jane Nicholson – Freshman; 44 – Leah Palmer – Freshman

== Season-by-season results ==
Record table
Season	Coach	Overall	Conference	Standing	Postseason
Iona Gaels (Metro Atlantic Athletic Conference) (1984–present)
1984	Linda Glum	N/A	N/A	1st	
1985	Linda Glum	N/A	N/A	1st	
1986	Linda Glum	N/A	N/A	1st	
1987	Linda Glum	N/A	N/A	6th	
1988	Linda Glum	N/A	N/A	5th	
1989	Linda Glum	N/A	N/A	7th	
1990	Linda Glum	N/A	N/A	7th	
1991	Linda Glum	N/A	N/A	7th	
1992	Linda Glum	N/A	N/A	4th	
1993	Linda Glum	N/A	N/A	2nd	
1994	Linda Glum	N/A	N/A	4th	
1995	Linda Glum	N/A	N/A	3rd	
1996	Linda Glum	N/A	N/A	N/A	
1997	Linda Glum	N/A	N/A	N/A	
1998	Linda Glum	N/A	N/A	N/A	
1999	Linda Glum	7–45	3–13	9th	
2000	Andrea Farquhar	11–26	4–12	T–8th	
2001	Andrea Farquhar	15–32	2–14	9th	
2002	Andrea Farquhar	21–24	10–6	4th	
2003	Andrea Farquhar	14–27	6–10	T–6th	
2004	Andrea Farquhar	26–20–1	9–7	T–3rd	
2005	Andrea Farquhar	32–14	15–1	1st	
2006	Andrea Farquhar	11–31	5–11	T–8th	
2007	Andrea Farquhar	14–23	8–8	5th	
2008	Jaime Wohlbach	13–32	7–9	5th	
2009	Jaime Wohlbach	13–27	4–10	8th	
2010	Jaime Wohlbach	28–26	13–3	T–1st	NCAA Regionals
2011	Roni Rivera	31–22	11–5	4th	NCAA Regionals
2012	Roni Rivera	35–26	12–4	8th	NCAA Regionals
2013	Melissa Inouye	13–37	9–7	T–4th	
2014	Melissa Inouye	24–24	14–6	3rd	NCAA Regionals
2015	Melissa Inouye	16–28	12–8	T–5th	
2016	Melissa Inouye	13–33	7–13	9th	
2017	Melissa Inouye	27–24	15–5	1st	
2018	Katie Jansson	19–27	11–9	4th	
2019	Katie Jansson	19–27	12–8	4th	
2020	Katie Jansson	2–6	0–0	N/A	Season cut short due to COVID-19 pandemic
2021	Alyssa Tiumalu	22–12	21–10	3rd	
2022	Alyssa Tiumalu	23–24	10–10	6th	
2023	Alyssa Tiumalu	21–31–1	10–10	6th	
2024	Alyssa Tiumalu	18–29	14–10	5th	
2025	Carla Campagna	29–21	18–8	3rd	
2026	Andy Russo	0–0	0–0	3rd	
Total:		519–698–2 (.427)			
National champion Postseason invitational champion Conference regular season champion Conference regular season and conference tournament champion Division regular season champion Division regular season and conference tournament champion Conference tournament champion

== See also ==
- List of NCAA Division I softball programs
