= St. Edward's Hilltoppers baseball =

College baseball team

- 2026 St. Edward's Hilltoppers baseball team
- Founded: 1902 (approx.)
- Overall record: 1819–1494–11
- University: St. Edward's University
- Athletic director: Dr. Jim Sarra
- Head coach: Ryan Femath (3rd season)
- Conference: Lone Star Conference
- Location: Austin, Texas
- Home stadium: Lucian-Hamilton Field
- Nickname: Hilltoppers
- Colors: Navy and Vegas gold

NCAA tournament appearances
- 2007 2013, 2014, 2015, 2016, 2017, 2018, 2022, 2023, 2025

Conference tournament champions
- Heartland: 2013, 2014, 2015, 2016, 2017, 2018

Conference regular season champions
- Heart of Texas: 1990; Heartland: 2007, 2009, 2014, 2015, 2016, 2018

The St. Edward's Hilltoppers baseball team represents St. Edward's University in NCAA Division II college baseball. The hilltoppers have competed in the Lone Star Conference since 2019. The Hilltoppers play home games at Lucian-Hamilton Field. The team won six consecutive conference championships in the Heartland Conference from 2013 to 2018.

== History ==
=== Early history ===
While the true date of origin for the team is unknown, the earliest confirmed season of play was during the 1902 season under head coach Billy Disch. The team was disbanded and reinstated several times during its early history, notably disbanding from 1909 to 1920 and from 1931 to 1947. From its formation until 1928 the team remained independent and unaffiliated with any athletic conference. Following this period, they were members of the Texas Conference from 1928 until 1952. In the early history of the program the baseball team remained comparatively undistinguished with no conference tournament or regular season championships during this time.

=== Present era ===
The team left the Texas conference following the 1952 season to join the Big State Conference during Brother Folen's tenure as head coach. It switched to the Heart of Texas conference in 1987, then again to the Heartland Conference in 1999 where the team won six consecutive conference tournament championships and four regular season championships between the years of 2013 and 2018 under head coach Rob Penders. The team also made 6 NCAA Division II tournament appearances during this same time period. However, in 2021 Penders was fired on allegations of racism against players following which Penders filed a bias lawsuit against the university. In 2024, Penders dropped the suit and settled with the university following two independent investigations that concluded he did not discriminate against two players named in the original allegations.

== Stadium ==
The Hilltoppers play at Lucian-Hamilton Field, named in honor of former athletic director Lucian Blersch and former baseball coach Tom Hamilton.

== Head coaches ==
Years	Coach	Record	Win %
1902–1908	Billy Disch	50–25–3	.660
1921	William Gardner	7–7	.500
1922–1929	Jack Meagher	34–37	.479
1930	Al Sarafiney	0–1	.000
1948–1954	Brother Folen	47–41–2	.533
1955–1956	Ed Norris (Note: Overall record shown reflects cumulative total across all tenures.)	56–60	.483
1960	Ed Norris	56–60	.483
1976–1977	Ed Norris	56–60	.483
1957	Tom McGlaughlin	7–7	.500
1958–1959	Brother Lucian Blersch	11–13	.458
1961–1973	Tom Hamilton	162–182–2	.471
1974–1975	Ray Schmotzer	29–40	.420
1978–1985	John Knorr (Note: Overall record shown reflects cumulative total across all tenures.)	317–198	.616
1986–1990	James Keller	128–148–2	.464
1991–1992	John Knorr	317–198	.616
1993–1994	Jack Lala	34–59–1	.367
1995–1998	Bud Mader	84–107	.440
1999–2002	Gene Salazar	93–101–1	.479
2003–2006	Jeremy Farber	121–97	.555
2007–2021	Rob Penders	507–276	.647
2022–2023	Bryan Faulds	72–43	.626
2024–present	Ryan Femath	60–52	.536

== Year-by-year results ==
Year	Coach	Record	Conference Record	Percent	Notes
1902	Billy Disch	4–2		.667	
1903	Billy Disch	3–0		1.000	
1904	Billy Disch	17–4		.810	
1905	Billy Disch	7–7		.500	
1906	Billy Disch	5–9		.357	
1907	Billy Disch	9–2		.818	
1908	Billy Disch	5–1–3		.722	
No team data from 1909 through 1920
1921	William Gardner	7–7		.500	
1922	Jack Meagher	7–7		.500	
1923	Jack Meagher	4–8		.333	
No team data from 1924 through 1925	Jack Meagher				
1926	Jack Meagher	8–10		.444	
1927	Jack Meagher				
1928	Jack Meagher	8–7	5–3	.533	
1929	Jack Meagher	7–5		.583	
1930	Al Sarafiney	0–1		.000	
No team data from 1931 through 1947
1948	Brother Folen	10–9–1		.525	
1950	Brother Folen	8–5–1		.607	
1951	Brother Folen	10–6		.625	
1952	Brother Folen	8–4	6–1	.667	
1953	Brother Folen	9–6	4–2	.600	
1954	Brother Folen	2–11	1–5	.354	
1955	Ed Norris	6–8	2–6	.429	
1956	Ed Norris	10–5	4–4	.667	
1957	Tom McGlaughlin	7–7	1–5	.500	
1958	Lucien Blersch	5–8	1–6	.385	
1959	Lucien Blersch	6–5	0–3	.546	
1960	Ed Norris	16–8	8–3	.667	
1961	Tom Hamilton	10–9	3–7	.526	
1962	Tom Hamilton	9–10	4–4	.474	
1963	Tom Hamilton	4–11	1–7	.267	
1964	Tom Hamilton	8–15	3–3	.348	
1965	Tom Hamilton	10–14	3–5	.417	
1966	Tom Hamilton	17–12	5–2	.586	
1967	Tom Hamilton	9–11	4–3	.450	
1968	Tom Hamilton	6–14	5–4	.300	
1969	Tom Hamilton	19–14	8–4	.576	
1970	Tom Hamilton	10–16	3–7	.385	
1971	Tom Hamilton	19–19–1	6–4	.500	
1972	Tom Hamilton	23–17–1	7–2	.573	
1973	Tom Hamilton	18–20	7–3	.474	
1974	Ray Schmotzer	15–19	7–5	.441	
1975	Ray Schmotzer	14–21	3–9	.400	
1976	Ed Norris	8–23	4–7	.258	
1977	Ed Norris	16–16	3–8	.500	
1978	John Knorr	31–18	6–9	.633	
1979	John Knorr	33–17	8–6	.660	
1980	John Knorr	35–22	11–6	.614	
1981	John Knorr	34–17	9–8	.667	
1982	John Knorr	32–26	7–9	.552	
1983	John Knorr	29–24	8–7	.547	
1984	John Knorr	40–13	9–6	.755	
1985	John Knorr	30–17	3–9	.638	
1986	James Keller	38–31	9–6	.551	
1987	James Keller	31–31–1	9–6	.500	
1988	James Keller	21–29–1	7–8	.422	
1989	James Keller	6–40	3–12	.130	
1990	James Keller	32–17	10–5	.653	
1991	John Knorr	27–22	2–10	.551	
1992	John Knorr	26–22	4–11	.542	
1993	Jack Lala	17–28–1	4–11	.380	
1994	Jack Lala	17–31	4–11	.354	
1995	Bud Mader	20–28	4–17	.417	
1996	Bud Mader	21–25	10–11	.466	
1997	Bud Mader	31–20	15–9	.617	
1998	Bud Mader	12–34	2–19	.261	
1999	Gene Salazar	22–25	8–12	.468	
2000	Gene Salazar	26–23		.531	
2001	Gene Salazar	28–24		.539	
2002	Gene Salazar	17–29–1		.372	
2003	Jeremy Farber	25–31		.446	
2004	Jeremy Farber	25–28	6–10	.472	
2005	Jeremy Farber	35–18	28–12	.660	
2006	Jeremy Farber	36–20	29–11	.643	
2007	Rob Penders	43–15	31–9	.741	
2008	Rob Penders	40–16	38–11	.714	
2009	Rob Penders	34–22	31–18	.607	
2010	Rob Penders	35–22	29–18	.614	
2011	Rob Penders	27–24	19–11	.529	
2012	Rob Penders	37–16	26–9	.698	
2013	Rob Penders	44–18	24–12	.710	
2014	Rob Penders	39–16	23–7	.709	
2015	Rob Penders	40–13	22–5	.755	
2016	Rob Penders	46–12	23–4	.793	
2017	Rob Penders	33–20	14–10	.623	
2018	Rob Penders	34–21	18–10	.618	
2019	Rob Penders	27–27	11–10	.500	
2020	Rob Penders	11–11	11–11	.500	
2021	Rob Penders	17–23	14–18	.425	
2022	Bryan Faulds	32–25	27–21	.561	
2023	Bryan Faulds	40–17	34–13	.702	
2024	Ryan Femath	23–29	23–25	.442	
2025	Ryan Femath	37–23	31–17	.617	

== First-team All-Americans ==
Name	Year	Selectors
Roger Metzger	1969	
Henry Thames	1982	
Greg Trlicek	1983	
Patrick Colgan	2007	
Stephen Johnson	2012	NCBWA, ABCA, Daktronics
Brannon Easterling	2014	ABCA, NCBWA
Wes Koenig	2014	ABCA, Daktronics, NCBWA
J.D. Arrowood	2016	ABCA
Connor Cox	2025	NCBWA

== Players in the MLB draft ==
Year	Name	Round	Team
1965	George Gazegorek	70th	Baltimore Orioles
1969	Roger Metzger	1st	Chicago Cubs
1972	Anton Rosentritt	14th	Atlanta Braves
1981	Bubba Jennings	10th	Cincinnati Reds
1981	Myron Gilmore	18th	Toronto Blue Jays
1987	Todd Van Horn	15th	Texas Rangers
1997	Todd Naff	30th	San Diego Padres
2005	Jesse Bogan	Ind.	Frontier League
2005	Stephen Puhl	17th	New York Mets
2006	Logan Wood	Ind.	American Association
2006	Stephen Puhl	17th	New York Mets
2008	Bradley Goldsmith	Ind.	American Association
2010	Jonathan Burns	26th	Atlanta Braves
2012	Tyler Harris	Ind.	American Association
2012	Casey Russell	Ind.	American Association
2012	Stephen Johnson	6th	San Francisco Giants
2013	Taylor Johnson	40th	Detroit Tigers
2014	Brannon Easterling	20th	Chicago White Sox
2014	Ransom LaLonde	Ind.	Frontier League
2015	J.D. Arrowood	40th	Cincinnati Reds
2016	Cameron Stanton	30th	Atlanta Braves
2016	Joseph Olson	FA	Tampa Bay Rays
2017	Hunter Courson	Ind.	American Association
2017	Romeo Cortina	Ind.	Frontier League
2017	Brandon Boone	39th	Miami Marlins
2017	Cam Hatch	Ind.	Pacific Association
2018	Tanner Lawson	21st	Atlanta Braves
2018	Jake Davis	Ind.	Frontier League
2021	Blake Holub	15th	Detroit Tigers
