= 2026 Southeastern Louisiana Lady Lions softball team =

American college softball season

2026 Southeastern Louisiana Lady Lions softball

Southland Conference regular season champion

NCAA Tuscaloosa Regional
- Conference: Southland Conference
- Record: 46–16 (24–3 Southland)
- Head coach: Rick Fremin (11th season)
- Assistant coaches: Katie Godwin; Alana Fremin; Matt Uhle; Sarah Kate Thompson
- Home stadium: North Oak Park

2026 Southland Conference softball standings
	Conf.				Overall
Team	W		L	PCT	W		L	PCT
Southeastern Louisiana ‍†‍‍^{y}	24	–	3	.889	46	–	16	.742
McNeese State ‍‍‡‍^{y}	18	–	9	.667	40	–	20	.667
Nicholls ‍‍‍	18	–	10	.643	36	–	23	.610
Incarnate Word ‍‍‍	17	–	10	.630	33	–	21	.611
Lamar ‍‍‍	16	–	11	.593	32	–	22	.593
Stephen F. Austin ‍‍‍	13	–	14	.481	31	–	28	.525
Northwestern State ‍‍‍	13	–	14	.481	24	–	29	.453
Texas A&M–Corpus Christi ‍‍‍	8	–	19	.296	14	–	38	.269
Houston Christian ‍‍‍	7	–	19	.269	10	–	36	.217
East Texas A&M ‍‍‍	1	–	25	.038	6	–	45	.118
† – Conference champion ‡ – Tournament champion y – Invited to the NCAA tournament As of May 17, 2026; Rankings from NFCA/USA Today

The 2026 Southeastern Louisiana Lady Lions softball team represents Southeastern Louisiana University during the 2026 NCAA Division I softball season. The Lady Lions play their home games at North Oak Park in Hammond, LA and are led by 11th-year head coach Rick Fremin. They are members of the Southland Conference.

== Personnel ==
2026 Southeastern Louisiana Lady Lions softball team
Players
Coaches

#	Pos.	Name	Bats/throws	Height	Year	Home town
1	P	Bre Clark	/	5 ft 7 in (1.7 m)	Fr	Panama City Beach, Florida
2	OF	Breezy Pantalion	/	5 ft 5 in (1.65 m)	Fr	Liberty, Texas
3	OF	Addison Contorno	/	5 ft 3 in (1.6 m)	Jr	Livingston, Louisiana
4	OF	Shenita Tucker	/	5 ft 0 in (1.52 m)	GS	Richmond, Texas
5	INF	Mykail Lusco	/	5 ft 8 in (1.73 m)	Jr	Harahan, Louisiana
7	P	Cera Blanchard	/	5 ft 7 in (1.7 m)	GS	Metairie, Louisiana
9	P	Macie LaRue	/	5 ft 5 in (1.65 m)	Sr	Lovelady, Texas
10	INF	Shelby Morris	/	5 ft 7 in (1.7 m)	So	Clinton, Louisiana
11	P	Hallie Burns (redshirt)	/	5 ft 3 in (1.6 m)	So	Booneville, Mississippi
12	INF	Brilee Ford	/	5 ft 5 in (1.65 m)	Jr	Albany, Louisiana
13	INF	Maria Detillier	/	5 ft 5 in (1.65 m)	Sr	Gramercy, Louisiana
14	C	Cydnee Schneider	/	5 ft 10 in (1.78 m)	Sr	Elkhorn, Nebraska
15	OF	Kailey Dixon	/	5 ft 3 in (1.6 m)	Sr	Hazard, Kentucky
16	INF	Chloe Magee	/	5 ft 8 in (1.73 m)	Jr	Watson, Louisiana
17	P	Celia Lamkin	/	5 ft 6 in (1.68 m)	So	Paris, Tennessee
19	P	Katherine Thiessen	/	6 ft 2 in (1.88 m)	Fr	Lloydminster, Canada
21	P	Haley Crawford	/	6 ft 0 in (1.83 m)	Jr	Houston, Texas
22	C	Blair Walsh	/	5 ft 10 in (1.78 m)	Jr	Centreville, Mississippi
23	INF	Katie Lott	/	5 ft 8 in (1.73 m)	Jr	Cypress, Texas
24	C	Lily Garcia	/	5 ft 2 in (1.57 m)	Jr	Troy, Texas
26	OF	Colleen Kulivan	/	5 ft 7 in (1.7 m)	Sr	Covington, Louisiana
27	P	Tyler Oubre	/	5 ft 10 in (1.78 m)	Sr	Destrehan, Louisiana
28	C	Nadia Chernich (redshirt)	/	5 ft 2 in (1.57 m)	Fr	North Pole, Alaska
30	OF	Ka'Lyn Watson	/	5 ft 8 in (1.73 m)	GS	Missouri City, Texas
31	OF	Veronica Puckett	/	5 ft 7 in (1.7 m)	Jr	Deltona, Florida

Head coach

Rick Fremin (Jackson State)

Assistant coach(es)

Katie Godwin (Southeastern Louisiana)
Alana Fremin (Belhaven)
Matt Uhle
Sarah Kate Thompson (Union)

Legend

- (C) Team captain
- (S) Suspended
- (I) Ineligible
- Injured
- Current redshirt

Roster
Last update: June 14, 2026

== Schedule and results ==
Legend
	Southeastern Louisiana win
	Southeastern Louisiana loss
	Postponement/Cancellation
**Bold**	Southeastern Louisiana team member
*	Non-Conference game
†	Make-Up Game

2026 Southeastern Louisiana Lady Lions softball game log (46–16)
Regular season (44–12)

February (14–7)
Date	Opponent	Rank	Site/stadium	Score	Win	Loss	Save	TV	Attendance	Overall record	SLC record
2026 NFCA Leadoff Classic
Feb. 5	vs. No. 13 Clemson*		Eddie C. Moore Complex • Clearwater, FL	3–5^{(8)}	Abby Dunning (1–0)	**Oubre, Tyler** (0–1)	Sierra Maness (1)		250	0–1	
Feb. 6	vs. South Alabama*		Eddie C. Moore Complex • Clearwater, FL	0–2	Ryley Harrison (2–0)	**Thiessen, Katherine** (0–1)	None		223	0–2	
Feb. 6	vs. Longwood*		Eddie C. Moore Complex • Clearwater, FL	9–0^{(5)}	**Blanchard, Cera** (1–0)	Morgan Strickland (0–1)	None		223	1–2	
Feb. 7	vs. Rutgers*		Eddie C. Moore Complex • Clearwater, FL	4–3	**Blanchard, Cera** (2–0)	Brooke Shifflett (0–2)	**Crawford, Haley** (1)		223	2–2	
Feb. 7	vs. Boston College*		Eddie C. Moore Complex • Clearwater, FL	10–1^{(5)}	**Burns, Hallie** (1–0)	Kelly Colleran (1–1)	None		234	3–2	
Feb. 8	vs. No. 5 Oregon*		Eddie C. Moore Complex • Clearwater, FL	4–2	**Burns, Hallie** (2–0)	Lyndsey Grein (1–3)	**Crawford, Haley** (2)	MLBN		4–2	
Feb. 11	Louisiana Tech*	No. 25	North Oak Park • Hammond, LA	1–6	Allie Floyd (1–0)	**Crawford, Haley** (0–1)	None	ESPN+	528	4–3	
2026 Mardi Gras Mambo
Feb. 12	vs. Eastern Illinois*	No. 25	Youngsville Sports Complex • Youngsville, LA	11–0^{(5)}	**Burns, Hallie** (3–0)	Bryanna French (1–2)	None		111	5–3	
Feb. 13	vs. Georgia State*	No. 25	Youngsville Sports Complex • Youngsville, LA	3–2	**Blanchard, Cera** (3–0)	Makayla Stephens (4–1)	None		111	6–3	
Feb. 13	vs. New Mexico*	No. 25	Youngsville Sports Complex • Youngsville, LA	4–3	**Crawford, Haley** (1–1)	Arianna Capek (0–1)	None		111	7–3	
Feb. 14	vs. SIU Edwardsville*	No. 25	Youngsville Sports Complex • Youngsville, LA	8–0^{(5)}	**Thiessen, Katherine** (1–1)	Mia Volpert (2–3)	None		222	8–3	
Feb. 14	vs. St. Thomas (MN)*		Youngsville Sports Complex • Youngsville, LA	3–2	**LaRue, Macie** (1–0)	Ella Cook (1–1)	**Blanchard, Cera** (1)		222	9–3	
2026 Michelle Short and Adam Brown Memorial Collegiate Classic
Feb. 20	vs. Saint Louis*		Shock Stadium • Conway, AR	5–2	**Burns, Hallie** (4–0)	Anna Christ (2–2)	**LaRue, Macie** (1)		91	10–3	
Feb. 20	at Central Arkansas*		Shock Stadium • Conway, AR	6–0	**Blanchard, Cera** (4–0)	Bailie Runner (3–2)	None	ESPN+	163	11–3	
Feb. 21	vs. Evansville*		Shock Stadium • Conway, AR	10–0^{(5)}	**LaRue, Macie** (2–0)	Kate Ridgway (2–1)	None		97	12–3	
Feb. 21	vs. Saint Louis*		Shock Stadium • Conway, AR	4–2	**Blanchard, Cera** (5–0)	Isabel Royle (3–3)	None		89	13–3	
Feb. 25	at No. 3 Texas*		Red and Charline McCombs Field • Austin, TX	2–7	Teagan Kavan (7–0)	**Burns, Hallie** (4–1)	None	SECN+	2,255	13–4	
Feb. 26	at UTSA*		North Park • Hammond, LA	1–2	Arlette Hernandez (5–2)	**Burns, Hallie** (4–2)	None	ESPN+	192	13–5	
Feb. 27	at Texas State*		North Park • Hammond, LA	4–0	**Blanchard, Cera** (6–0)	Madison Azua (8–6)	None			14–5	
Feb. 27	at Texas State*		North Park • Hammond, LA	0–1	Emma Strood (1–1)	**Blanchard, Cera** (6–1)	Chesney Davis (1)			14–6	
Feb. 28	at Texas State*		North Park • Hammond, LA	1–4	Emma Strood (2–1)	**LaRue, Macie** (2–1)	Madison Azua (1)	ESPN+		14–7	

March (16–2)
Date	Opponent	Rank	Site/stadium	Score	Win	Loss	Save	TV	Attendance	Overall record	SLC record
Mar. 1	vs. Sam Houston*		Love's Field • Norman, OK	2–3^{(9)}	Kendall Daniel (3–1)	**LaRue, Macie** (2–2)	None		475	14–8	
Mar. 1	at No. 5 Oklahoma*		Love's Field • Norman, OK	1–9^{(5)}	Audrey Lowry (10–1)	**Burns, Hallie** (4–3)	None	SECN+	3,837	14–9	
Mar. 5	at UT Arlington*		North Park • Hammond, LA	5–0	**Blanchard, Cera** (7–1)	Maddie Furniss (3–4)	None	ESPN+	85	15–9	
Mar. 6	at East Texas A&M		North Park • Hammond, LA	13–0^{(5)}	**Burns, Hallie** (5–3)	Madison Kloepper (3–7)	None	ESPN+	93	16–9	1–0
Mar. 6	at East Texas A&M		North Park • Hammond, LA	11–4	**Clark, Bre** (1–0)	Avery Rohlman (0–1)	None	ESPN+	113	17–9	2–0
Mar. 7	at East Texas A&M		North Park • Hammond, LA	10–1^{(5)}	**Crawford, Haley** (2–1)	Maddie Muller (1–7)	None	ESPN+	186	18–9	3–0
Mar. 11	Southern Miss*		North Park • Hammond, LA	11–3^{(6)}	**Burns, Hallie** (6–3)	Madilyn Graham (5–2)	None	ESPN+	253	19–9	
Mar. 13	Houston Christian		North Park • Hammond, LA	8–0^{(6)}	**LaRue, Macie** (3–2)	Leah Hammack (1–4)	None	ESPN+	250	20–9	4–0
Mar. 13	Houston Christian		North Park • Hammond, LA	19–0^{(5)}	**Thiessen, Katherine** (2–1)	Addy Prasifka (0–7)	None	ESPN+	250	21–9	5–0
Mar. 14	Houston Christian		North Park • Hammond, LA	13–3^{(5)}	**Burns, Hallie** (7–3)	Cara Pitman (1–8)	None	ESPN+	250	22–9	6–0
Mar. 17	Jackson State*		North Park • Hammond, LA	9–0^{(5)}	**Burns, Hallie** (8–3)	Jorgina Gant (4–3)	None		412	23–9	
Mar. 20	Northwestern State		North Park • Hammond, LA	10–2^{(6)}	**Burns, Hallie** (9–3)	Mattison Buster (12–7)	None	ESPN+	340	24–9	7–0
Mar. 20	Northwestern State		North Park • Hammond, LA	3–1	**Blanchard, Cera** (8–1)	Brooklynn Stohler (1–6)	None	ESPN+	340	25–9	8–0
Mar. 21	Northwestern State		North Park • Hammond, LA	2–1	**Blanchard, Cera** (9–1)	Mattison Buster (12–8)	None	ESPN+	244	26–9	9–0
Mar. 24	at Louisiana–Monroe*		Geo-Surfaces Field at the ULM Softball Complex • Monroe, LA	3–0	**Blanchard, Cera** (1–1)	Dakota Lake (4–4)	**Burns, Hallie** (1)	ESPN+	565	27–9	
Mar. 27	at Texas A&M–Corpus Christi		Chapman Field • Corpus Christi, TX	12–2	**Burns, Hallie** (9–3)	Kendra Winfrey (7–8)	None	ESPN+	211	28–9	10–0
Mar. 28	at Texas A&M–Corpus Christi		Chapman Field • Corpus Christi, TX	6–0	**Crawford, Haley** (3–1)	Josie Whitehead (3–10)	None	ESPN+	378	29–9	11–0
Mar. 28	at Texas A&M–Corpus Christi		Chapman Field • Corpus Christi, TX	4–0	**Blanchard, Cera** (11–1)	Kendra Winfrey (7–9)	None	ESPN+	392	30–9	12–0

April (14–3)
Date	Opponent	Rank	Site/stadium	Score	Win	Loss	Save	TV	Attendance	Overall record	SLC record
Apr. 2	at McNeese		Joe Miller Field at Cowgirl Diamond • Lake Charles, LA	4–0	**Burns, Hallie** (11–3)	Kynlei Chapman (5–5)	**Blanchard, Cera** (2)	ESPN+		31–9	13–0
Apr. 2	at McNeese		Joe Miller Field at Cowgirl Diamond • Lake Charles, LA	10–5	**Crawford, Haley** (4–1)	Brookelyn Taylor (8–6)	None	ESPN+	798	32–9	14–0
Apr. 3	at McNeese		Joe Miller Field at Cowgirl Diamond • Lake Charles, LA	4–0	**Burns, Hallie** (12–3)	Maddie Taylor (7–4)	None	ESPN+	838	33–9	15–0
Apr. 8	at Southern Miss*		USM Softball Complex • Hattiesburg, MS	5–4	**Burns, Hallie** (13–3)	Davis McCall (0–1)	None	ESPN+	640	34–9	
Apr. 10	Lamar		North Park • Hammond, LA	8–0^{(5)}	**LaRue, Macie** (4–2)	Reagan Smith (10–3)	None	ESPN+	366	35–9	16–0
Apr. 10	Lamar		North Park • Hammond, LA	8–1	**Burns, Hallie** (14–3)	Madison Guidry (2–5)	None	ESPN+	366	36–9	17–0
Apr. 11	Lamar		North Park • Hammond, LA	4–0	**Blanchard, Cera** (12–1)	Kaylee Cuevas (6–5)	**Burns, Hallie** (2)		467	37–9	18–0
Apr. 14	at Stephen F. Austin		SFA Softball Field • Nacogdoches, TX	2–1	**Burns, Hallie** (15–3)	Amelia Hatthorn (8–5)	None		127	38–9	19–0
Apr. 14	at Stephen F. Austin		SFA Softball Field • Nacogdoches, TX	5–2	**LaRue, Macie** (5–2)	Crimson Bryant (6–9)	**Blanchard, Cera** (3)		127	39–9	20–0
Apr. 15	at Stephen F. Austin		SFA Softball Field • Nacogdoches, TX	3–4	Amelia Hatthorn (9–5)	**Burns, Hallie** (15–4)	None		136	39–10	20–1
Apr. 17	at Nicholls		Swanner Field at Geo Surfaces Park • Thibodaux, LA	1–3	Averi Paden (6–3)	**Crawford, Haley** (4–2)	None	ESPN+	267	39–11	20–2
Apr. 17	at Nicholls		Swanner Field at Geo Surfaces Park • Thibodaux, LA	8–3	**Burns, Hallie** (16–4)	Molly Yoo (15–9)	None	ESPN+	340	40–11	21–2
Apr. 18	at Nicholls		Swanner Field at Geo Surfaces Park • Hammond, LA	13–1^{(5)}	**Burns, Hallie** (17–4)	Averi Paden (6–4)	None	ESPN+	181	41–11	22–2
Apr. 21	Alcorn State*		North Park • Hammond, LA	13–0^{(5)}	**Burns, Hallie** (18–4)	Chiara Olison (7–18)	None	ESPN+	288	42–11	
Apr. 24	Incarnate Word		North Park • Hammond, LA	8–0^{(5)}	**LaRue, Macie** (6–2)	Jenny Robledo (6–4)	None	ESPN+	357	43–11	23–2
Apr. 24	Incarnate Word		North Park • Hammond, LA	10–0^{(5)}	**Blanchard, Cera** (13–1)	Sam Portillo (5–4)	None	ESPN+	357	44–11	24–2
Apr. 25	Incarnate Word		North Park • Hammond, LA	7–8	Emma Follis (4–2)	**Clark, Bre** (1–1)	Bella Mitchell (3)	ESPN+	357	44–12	24–3

Post-season (2–4)

Southland Tournament (2–2)
Date	Opponent	(Seed)/Rank	Site/stadium	Score	Win	Loss	Save	TV	Attendance	Overall record	Tournament record
Apr. 30	(8) Texas A&M–Corpus Christi	(1)	North Park • Hammond, LA	8–0^{(6)}	**Burns, Hallie** (19–4)	Kendra Winfrey (9–14)	None	ESPN+	357	45–12	1–0
May 2	(5) Lamar	(1)	North Park • Hammond, LA	1–2^{(8)}	Reagan Smith (14–5)	**Blanchard, Cera** (13–2)	None	ESPN+	403	45–13	1–1
May 2	(4) Incarnate Word	(1)	North Park • Hammond, LA	6–4	**Burns, Hallie** (20–4)	Jenny Robledo (6–5)	None	ESPN+	420	46–13	2–1
May 3	(5) Lamar	(1)	North Park • Hammond, LA	1–2^{(8)}	Reagan Smith (15–5)	**LaRue, Macie** (6–3)	None	ESPN+	433	46–14	2–2

NCAA Tournament (0–2)
Date	Opponent	(Seed)/Rank	Site/stadium	Score	Win	Loss	Save	TV	Attendance	Overall record	Tournament record
May 15	vs. Belmont*		Rhoads Stadium • Tuscaloosa, AL	0–2	Maya Johnson (28–2)	**Blanchard, Cera** (13–3)	None	ESPN+	2,510	46–15	0–1
May 16	vs. USC Upstate*		Rhoads Stadium • Tuscaloosa, AL	4–5	Maddie Drerup (21–14)	**Burns, Hallie** (20–5)	None	ESPN+		46–16	0–2

Schedule source:*Rankings are based on the team's current ranking in the NFCA/USA Softball poll.

== Conference awards and honors ==
=== Post-season All-Southland Conference Teams ===
Player of the Year: Victoria Altamirano, Incarnate Word

Hitter of the Year: Victoria Altamirano, Incarnate Word

Pitcher of the Year: Hallie Burns, Southeastern Louisiana

Freshman of the Year: Isabella Flores, Lamar

Newcomer of the Year: Mattison Buster, Northwestern State

Coach of the Year: Rick Fremin, Southeastern Louisiana

==== First Team ====
- Tatum Wright (ETAM, SR, 1st Base)
- Shelby Morris (SLU, JR, 2nd Base)
- Kassidy Chance (McN, SO, Shortstop)
- Maria Detillier (SLU, JR, 3rd Base)
- Cydnee Schneider (SLU, SR, Center)
- Brynn Daniel (NWST, SO, Utility)
- Kayleigh Lugowski (NICH, SR, Designated Player)
- Victoria Altamirano (UIW, SR, Outfielder)
- Nyjah Fontenot (McN, JR–R, Outfielder)
- Ka'Lyn Watson (SLU, GR, Outfielder)
- Hallie Burns (SLU, SO–R, Pitcher)
- Mattison Buster (NWST, JR, Pitcher)

==== Second Team ====
- Brilee Ford (SLU, JR, 1st Base)
- Ellie Vance (SFA, GR, 2nd Base)
- Chloe Magee (McN, SR, Shortstop)
- Bryanna Fuentes (UIW, JR, 3rd Base)
- Adelynn Bacerra (SFA, SR, Catcher)
- Maddie Taylor (McN, SO, Designated Player)
- Ayla Gonzales (UIW, JR, Outfielder)
- Madison Moak (NICH, GR, Outfielder)
- Alexis Dibbley (McN, JR, Outfielder)
- Cera Blanchard (SLU, GR, Pitcher)
- Molly Yoo (NICH, GR, Pitcher)

==== All Defensive ====
- Sydney Zenon (UIW, JR, 1st Base)
- Claire Sisco (NICH, SR, 2nd Base)
- Sicily Windham (LU, SO, Shortstop)
- Maria Detillier (SLU, SR, 3rd Base)
- Cydnee Schneider (SLU, SR, Catcher)
- Colleen Kulivan (SLU, SR, Right Field)
- JT Smith (NWST, GR, Center Field)
- Laylin Sturm (NICH, JR, Left Field)
- Cera Blanchard (SLU, GR, Pitcher)

=== Weekly awards ===
Weekly honors
Honors	Player	Position	Date Awarded	Ref.
SLC Softball Pitcher of the week	Hallie Burns	RHP	February 9, 2026	
SLC Softball Hitter of the week	Maria Detillier	3B	March 16, 2026	
SLC Softball Pitcher of the week	Cera Blanchard	RHP	March 30, 2026	
SLC Softball Hitter of the week	Ka'Lyn Watson	OF	April 13, 2026	
SLC Softball Pitcher of the week	Hallie Burns	RHP	April 20, 2026	

== See also ==
- 2026 Southeastern Louisiana Lions baseball team
