= 2015 Louisiana–Lafayette Ragin' Cajuns softball team =

American college softball season

2015 Louisiana–Lafayette Ragin' Cajuns softball

Auburn Super Regionals appearance Lafayette Regionals champions Sun Belt Conference regular-season champions

Louisiana Classic Champions Mardi Gras Classic Champions Ragin' Cajun Invitational Champions
- Conference: Sun Belt Conference

Ranking
- Coaches: No. 11
- Record: 42-12 (20-3 SBC)
- Head coach: Michael Lotief (15th season)
- Assistant coaches: T. J. Hubbard; Lisa Norris
- Home stadium: Lamson Park

2015 Sun Belt Conference softball standings
	Conf.				Overall
Team	W		L	PCT	W		L	PCT
No. 11 Louisiana–Lafayette†^{y} ‍‍‍	20	–	3	.870	42	–	12	.778
No. 22 South Alabama ‍‍‡‍^{y}	16	–	4	.800	40	–	13	.755
Texas State ‍‍‍	14	–	6	.700	32	–	21	.604
Troy ‍‍‍	14	–	9	.609	32	–	23	.582
Georgia State ‍‍‍	14	–	10	.583	38	–	22	.633
Louisiana–Monroe ‍‍‍	10	–	12	.455	30	–	22	.577
Texas–Arlington ‍‍‍	8	–	15	.348	27	–	28	.491
Georgia Southern ‍‍‍	4	–	20	.167	12	–	39	.235
Appalachian State ‍‍‍	1	–	22	.043	14	–	35	.286
† – Conference champion ‡ – Tournament champion y – Invited to the NCAA tournament As of May 24, 2015; Rankings from USA Today/NFCA Coaches

The 2015 Louisiana–Lafayette Ragin' Cajuns softball team represented the University of Louisiana at Lafayette in the 2015 NCAA Division I softball season. The Ragin' Cajuns played their home games at Lamson Park and were led by fifteenth year head coach Michael Lotief.

== Preseason ==
=== Sun Belt Conference Coaches Poll ===
The Sun Belt Conference Coaches Poll was released on January 28, 2015. Louisiana-Lafayette was picked to finish first in the Sun Belt Conference with 79 votes and 7 first place votes.

Coaches poll
Predicted finish	Team	Votes (1st place)
1	Louisiana-Lafayette	79 (7)
2	South Alabama	74 (2)
3	Georgia State	57
4	Texas State	48
5	Georgia Southern	44
6	Troy	37
7	Louisiana-Monroe	27
8	UT Arlington	24
9	Appalachian State	15

=== Preseason All-Sun Belt team ===
- Christina Hamilton (ULL, SR, Pitcher)
- Farish Beard (USA, SR, Pitcher)
- Lexie Elkins (ULL, JR, Catcher)
- Lauren Coleman (GSU, SR, 1st Base)
- Miyuki Navarrete (ULM, SR, 2nd Base)
- Taylor Anderson (GSU, JR, Shortstop)
- Courtney Harris (TXST, SR, 3rd Base)
- Rochelle Roberts (ULM, SO, Outfield)
- Blair Johnson (USA, SR, Outfield)
- Stephanie Pilkington (USA, JR, Outfield)
- Kortney Koroll (TXST, SR, Designated Player)
- Taylor Rogers (GASO, SO, At-Large)
- Haley Hayden (ULL, SO, At-Large)
- Shellie Landry (ULL, JR, At-Large)
- Alexis Cacioppo (ULM, SR, At-Large)

==== Sun Belt Preseason Player of the Year ====
- Lexie Elkins (ULL, JR, Catcher)

==== Sun Belt Preseason Pitcher of the Year ====
- Christina Hamilton (ULL, SR, Pitcher)

== Roster ==
2016 Louisiana-Lafayette Ragin' Cajuns roster
Pitchers: 7 Jordan Wallace - Senior; 10 Allison Deville - Freshman; 11 Kylee Jo Trahan - Freshman; 16 Christina Hamilton - Redshirt Senior; 18 Alex Stewart - Sophomore; 24 Macey Smith - Sophomore; 32 Victoria Brown - Junior; Catchers: 9 Linzey Cifreo - Senior; 26 Allie Medlin - Freshman; 33 Lexie Elkins - Junior; 34 Miranda Grotenhuis - Freshman; Utility Players: 2 Jaime Landry - Freshman; 4 Kassidy Zeringue - Sophomore; 5 Megan Thomas - Junior; 12 Gabby Felps - Junior; 13 Marie Hoag - Senior; 19 Lexie Comeaux - Freshman; 25 Sara Corbello - Junior; 27 Sarah Arceneaux - Sophomore	Infielders: 00 Katie Repole - Junior; 21 Samantha Walsh - Redshirt Junior; 23 Ciarra Cherry - Redshirt Freshman; 28 Kelsey Vincent - Junior; 29 Lexi Rouse - Redshirt Freshman; 31 Corin Voinche - Sophomore; 35 Haley Hayden - Sophomore; 37 DJ Sanders - Freshman; 42 Abby Sterling - Freshman; Outfielders: 3 Taylor Terrio - Sophomore; 6 Taylor Meaux - Senior; 8 Aleah Craighton - Freshman; 14 Cassidy White - Junior; 20 Kendall Smith - Sophomore; 22 Shellie Landry - Junior; 30 Kelli Martinez - Freshman; Designated Players: 12 Leandra Maly - Senior

=== Coaching staff ===
2015 Louisiana-Lafayette Ragin' Cajuns coaching staff
- Michael Lotief – Head coach – 15th year
- T. J. Hubbard – Associate head coach – 3rd year
- Lisa Norris – Assistant head coach – 2nd year
- Sarah Draheim – Manager

== Schedule and results ==
Legend
	Louisiana-Lafayette win
	Louisiana-Lafayette loss
	Postponement/Cancellation
**Bold**	Louisiana team member

2015 Louisiana-Lafayette Ragin' Cajuns Softball Game Log
Regular season (37-8)

February (15-1)
Date	Opponent	Rank	Site/stadium	Score	Win	Loss	Save	TV	Attendance	Overall record	SBC record
Louisiana Classics
Feb. 6	North Carolina State	No. 9	Lamson Park • Lafayette, LA	**W** 6-0	**Wallace** (1-0)	Weiman (0-1)	None	Ragin' Cajuns Digital Network	1,817	1-0	
Feb. 7	Central Arkansas	No. 9	Lamson Park • Lafayette, LA	**W** 8-0 (5 inn)	**Trahan** (1-0)	Studioso (1-1)	None	Ragin' Cajuns Digital Network		2-0	
Feb. 7	Eastern Illinois	No. 9	Lamson Park • Lafayette, LA	**W** 17-0 (5 inn)	**Stewart** (1-0)	Rogers (0-1)	None	Ragin' Cajuns Digital Network	1,916	3-0	
Feb. 8	Eastern Illinois	No. 9	Lamson Park • Lafayette, LA	**W** 9-0 (5 inn.)	**Stewart** (2-0)	Wireman (1-2)	None	Ragin' Cajuns Digital Network	1,464	4-0	
Mardi Gras Classic
Feb. 13	Idaho State	No. 7	Lamson Park • Lafayette, LA	**W** 5-1	**Stewart** (3-0)	Ames (0-2)	None	Ragin' Cajuns Digital Network		5-0	
Feb. 13	Mississippi Valley State	No. 7	Lamson Park • Lafayette, LA	**W** 15-0	**Wallace** (2-0)	Coe (0-1)	None	Ragin' Cajuns Digital Network	1,155	6-0	
Feb. 14	Mississippi Valley State	No. 7	Lamson Park • Lafayette, LA	**W** 20-0 (5 inn)	**Trahan** (2-0)	Young (0-6)	None	Ragin' Cajuns Digital Network		7-0	
Feb. 14	Idaho State	No. 7	Lamson Park • Lafayette, LA	**W** 3-0	**Stewart** (4-0)	Slagle (1-3)	**Wallace** (1)	Ragin' Cajuns Digital Network	1,444	8-0	
Feb. 15	Idaho State	No. 7	Lamson Park • Lafayette, LA	**W** 6-0	**Wallace** (3-0)	Foster (2-1)	None	Ragin' Cajuns Digital Network	1,356	9-0	
Ragin' Cajuns Invitational
Feb. 20	Iowa	No. 6	Lamson Park • Lafayette, LA	**W** 4-3	**Hamilton** (1-0)	Starkenburg (2-4)	None	Ragin' Cajuns Digital Network		10-0	
Feb. 20	Hofstra	No. 6	Lamson Park • Lafayette, LA	**W** 3-0	**Wallace** (4-0)	Pirone (1-3)	None	Ragin' Cajuns Digital Network	1,353	11-0	
Feb. 21	Hofstra	No. 6	Lamson Park • Lafayette, LA	**W** 9-0 (6 inn)	**Hamilton** (2-0)	Pirone (2-4)	None	Ragin' Cajuns Digital Network		12-0	
Feb. 21	Missouri State	No. 6	Lamson Park • Lafayette, LA	**W** 5-0	**Wallace** (5-0)	Struemph (1-2)	None	Ragin' Cajuns Digital Network	1,396	13-0	
Feb. 22	McNeese State	No. 6	Lamson Park • Lafayette, LA	**W** 11-3 (5 inn)	**Hamilton** (3-0)	Allred (0-2)	None	ESPN3	1,738	14-0	
Feb. 28	at No. 4 Alabama	No. 5	Rhoads Stadium • Tuscaloosa, AL	**L** 1-5	Littlejohn (6-0)	**Hamilton** (3-1)	None	SECN+	2,448	14-1	
Feb. 28	at No. 4 Alabama	No. 5	Rhoads Stadium • Tuscaloosa, AL	**W** 2-1	**Wallace** (6-0)	Osorio (5-2)	None	SECN+	2,956	15-1	

March (12-4)
Date	Opponent	Rank	Site/stadium	Score	Win	Loss	Save	TV	Attendance	Overall record	SBC record
Mar. 1	at No. 4 Alabama	No. 5	Rhoads Stadium • Tuscaloosa, AL	**L** 2-3	Littlejohn (6-0)	**Wallace** (6-1)	None	SECN+	2,724	15-2	
Mar. 7	at No. 24 South Alabama	No. 7	Jaguar Field • Mobile, AL	**W** 3-2	**Wallace** (7-1)	Brown (7-3)	None	None	673	16-2	1-0
Mar. 7	at No. 24 South Alabama	No. 7	Jaguar Field • Mobile, AL	**W** 9-3	**Hamilton** (4-1)	Brown (7-4)	None	None	673	17-2	2-0
Mar. 8	at No. 24 South Alabama	No. 7	Jaguar Field • Mobile, AL	**L** 5-8	Brown (8-4)	**Trahan** (2-1)	McGill (2)	None	514	17-3	2-1
Mar. 11	at Northwestern State	No. 7	Lady Demon Diamond • Natchitoches, LA	Game Cancelled due to rainy conditions in Natchitoches. The game was not rescheduled.							
Mar. 13	UT Arlington	No. 7	Lamson Park • Lafayette, LA	**W** 18-0 (5 inn)	**Wallace** (8-1)	Montes (5-7)	None	Ragin' Cajuns Digital Network	1,303	18-3	3-1
Mar. 14	UT Arlington	No. 7	Lamson Park • Lafayette, LA	**W** 4-1	**Wallace** (9-1)	Donaldson (4-6)	None	ESPN3		19-3	4-1
Mar. 14	UT Arlington	No. 7	Lamson Park • Lafayette, LA	**W** 8-0 (6 inn)	**Hamilton** (5-1)	Montes (5-6)	None	ESPN3	1,801	20-3	5-1
Mar. 16	Georgia Southern	No. 7	Lamson Park • Lafayette, LA	**W** 8-2	**Wallace** (10-1)	Red (4-8)	None	Ragin' Cajuns Digital Network	994	21-3	6-1
Mar. 17	Georgia Southern	No. 7	Lamson Park • Lafayette, LA	**W** 12-1 (5 inn)	**Hamilton** (6-1)	Camp (2-5)	None	Ragin' Cajuns Digital Network		22-3	7-1
Mar. 17	Georgia Southern	No. 7	Lamson Park • Lafayette, LA	**W** 9-0 (6 inn)	**Wallace** (11-1)	Red (4-9)	None	Ragin' Cajuns Digital Network	1,102	23-3	8-1
Mar. 21	Troy	No. 5	Lamson Park • Lafayette, LA	**L** 5-9	Rainey (6-2)	**Wallace** (11-2)	Affeldt (1)	ESPN3		23-4	8-2
Mar. 21	Troy	No. 7	Lamson Park • Lafayette, LA	**W** 6-3	**Hamilton** (7-1)	Mock (3-7)	None	ESPN3	1,377	24-4	9-2
Mar. 22	Troy	No. 7	Lamson Park • Lafayette, LA	**W** 12-2 (5 inn)	**Hamilton** (8-1)	Mock (3-8)	None	Ragin' Cajuns Digital Network	1,445	25-4	10-2
Mar. 28	at Texas State	No. 9	Bobcat Softball Stadium • San Marcos, TX	**L** 13-14	Rupp (15-8)	**Hamilton** (8-2)	None	None	789	25-5	10-3
Mar. 28	at Texas State	No. 9	Bobcat Softball Stadium • San Marcos, TX	**W** 15-2 (5 inn)	**Stewart** (5-0)	Garner (3-2)	None	None	789	26-5	11-3
Mar. 29	at Texas State	No. 9	Bobcat Softball Stadium • San Marcos, TX	**W** 4-0	**Stewart** (6-0)	Rupp (15-9)	None	None	650	27-5	12-3

April (7-3)
Date	Opponent	Rank	Site/stadium	Score	Win	Loss	Save	TV	Attendance	Overall record	SBC record
Apr. 1	at McNeese State	No. 12	Joe Miller Field at Cowgirl Diamond • Lake Charles, LA	Game cancelled after officials with the Ragin' Cajuns Athletic Department determined that it would be in the best interest of student-athlete welfare, in light of present medical conditions of Michael Lotief, to not travel for this game.							
Apr. 3	Georgia State	No. 12	Lamson Park • Lafayette, LA	**W** 10-1 (6 inn)	**Stewart** (7-0)	Worley (7-6)	None	Ragin' Cajuns Digital Network	1,390	28-5	13-3
Apr. 4	Georgia State	No. 12	Lamson Park • Lafayette, LA	**W** 10-2 (6 inn)	**Stewart** (8-0)	Milton (1-3)	None	Ragin' Cajuns Digital Network		29-5	14-3
Apr. 4	Georgia State	No. 12	Lamson Park • Lafayette, LA	**W** 8-0 (5 inn)	**Wallace** (12-2)	Thorpe (11-3)	None	Ragin' Cajuns Digital Network	1,628	30-5	15-3
Apr. 7	at Sam Houston State	No. 12	Bearkat Softball Complex • Huntsville, TX	Game canceled due to field conditions and impending rain in Huntsville.							
Apr. 10	No. 14 Baylor	No. 10	Lamson Park • Lafayette, LA	Game cancelled due to a rain out in Lafayette.							
Apr. 11	No. 14 Baylor	No. 10	Lamson Park • Lafayette, LA	**W** 3-1	**Wallace** (13-2)	Stearns (13-6)	None	ESPN3		31-5	
Apr. 11	No. 14 Baylor	No. 10	Lamson Park • Lafayette, LA	**W** 12-2 (5 inn)	**Stewart** (9-0)	Potts (5-2)	None	ESPN3	1,706	32-5	
Apr. 15	Houston	No. 9	Lamson Park • Lafayette, LA	Cancelled due to a three-day spell of heavy rains and unfavorable field conditions in Lafayette.							
Apr. 18	at Appalachian State	No. 9	ASU Softball Stadium • Boone, NC	**W** 21-5 (5 inn)	**Wallace** (14-2)	Williford (4-2)	None	None	257	33-5	16-3
Apr. 18	at Appalachian State	No. 9	ASU Softball Stadium • Boone, NC	**W** 23-6 (5 inn)	**Stewart** (10-0)	Ciocatto (3-10)	None	None	267	34-5	17-3
Apr. 19	at Appalachian State	No. 9	ASU Softball Stadium • Boone, NC	Game cancelled due to continuous rains in Boone.							
Apr. 24	at No. 2 Oregon	No. 9	Howe Field • Eugene, OR	**L** 0-8 (5 inn)	Hawkins (21-3)	**Wallace** (14-3)	None	None	540	34-6	
Apr. 25	at No. 2 Oregon	No. 9	Howe Field • Eugene, OR	**L** 2-10 (5 inn)	Hawkins (22-3)	**Stewart** (10-1)	None	None		34-7	
Apr. 25	at No. 2 Oregon	No. 9	Howe Field • Eugene, OR	**L** 1-2 (8 inn)	**Hawkins** (23-3)	**Wallace** (14-4)	None	None	1,280	34-8	

May (3-0)
Date	Opponent	Rank	Site/stadium	Score	Win	Loss	Save	TV	Attendance	Overall record	SBC record
May 2	at Louisiana-Monroe	No. 10	Geo-Surfaces Field at the ULM Softball Complex • Monroe, LA	**W** 9-3	**Wallace** (14-5)	Coyne (11-12)	None	None	527	35-8	18-3
May 2	at Louisiana-Monroe	No. 10	Geo-Surfaces Field at the ULM Softball Complex • Monroe, LA	**W** 20-2 (5 inn)	**Hamilton** (9-2)	Porter (10-5)	None	None	527	36-8	19-3
May 3	at Louisiana-Monroe	No. 10	Geo Surfaces Field at the ULM Softball Complex • Monroe, LA	**W** 9-2	**Hamilton** (10-2)	Coyne (11-13)	**Wallace** (2)	None	347	37-8	20-3

Post-Season (5-4)

SBC tournament (2-1)
Date	Opponent	Seed/rank	Site/stadium	Score	Win	Loss	Save	TV	Attendance	Overall record	SBC record
May 7	vs. Georgia State	No. 11	Bobcat Softball Stadium • San Marcos, TX	**W** 10-6 (6 inn)	**Wallace** (16-4)	Thorpe (17-6)	None	None	559	38-8	
May 8	vs. No. 23 South Alabama	No. 11	Bobcat Softball Stadium • San Marcos, TX	**W** 6-3	**Hamilton** (11-2)	McGill (16-3)	None	None	533	39-8	
May 9	vs. No. 23 South Alabama	No. 11	Bobcat Softball Stadium • San Marcos, TX	**L** 0-2	Brown (10-4)	**Wallace** (16-5)	None	ESPN3	527	39-9	

NCAA Division I Baseball Championship (3-3)
Date	Opponent	Seed/rank	Site/stadium	Score	Win	Loss	Save	TV	Attendance	Overall record	SBC record
Lafayette Regionals
May 15	vs. Weber State	No. 11	Lamson Park • Lafayette, LA	**W** 11-0 (5 inn)	**Hamilton** (12-2)	Flint (14-8)	None	ESPN3	996	40-9	
May 16	vs. No. 18 Baylor	No. 11	Lamson Park • Lafayette, LA	**W** 3-1	**Wallace** (17-5)	Stearns (20-12)	None	ESPN3	1,797	41-9	
May 17	vs. No. 18 Baylor	No. 11	Lamson Park • Lafayette, LA	**L** 2-6	Stearns (21-12)	**Hamilton** (12-3)	None	ESPN2	1,877	41-10	
May 17	vs. No. 18 Baylor	No. 11	Lamson Park • Lafayette, LA	**W** 9-1 (6 inn)	**Wallace** (18-5)	Stearns (21-13)	None	ESPNU	1,161	42-10	
Auburn Super Regionals
May 22	at No. 4 Auburn	No. 11	Jane B. Moore Field • Auburn, AL	**L** 11-12 (8 inn)	Davis (23-2)	**Hamilton** (12-4)	None	ESPNU	1,700	42-11	
May 23	at No. 4 Auburn	No. 11	Jane B. Moore Field • Auburn, AL	**L** 3-6	Davis (24-2)	**Stewart** (10-2)	None	ESPN	1,714	42-12	

Schedule source:

== Lafayette Regional ==
Lafayette Regional Teams
(1) Louisiana–Lafayette Ragin' Cajuns	(2) Baylor Lady Bears	(3) Mississippi State Bulldogs	(4) Weber State Wildcats

First Round
13	Louisiana–Lafayette	11
Weber State	0
Mississippi State	4
Baylor	8
Lower round 1
Weber State	0
Mississippi State	2

Semi-Finals
13	Louisiana–Lafayette	3
Baylor	1
Lower final
Baylor	2
Mississippi State	0

Finals
13	Louisiana–Lafayette	2	9
Baylor	6	1

== Auburn Super Regional ==
Auburn Super Regional Teams
(1) Auburn Tigers	(2) Louisiana–Lafayette Ragin' Cajuns

Game 1
Rank	Team	Score
13	Louisiana-Lafayette	11
4	Auburn	12

Game 2
Rank	Team	Score
13	Louisiana-Lafayette	3
4	Auburn	6
