= 2015 Louisiana–Monroe Warhawks softball team =

American college softball season

2015 Louisiana–Monroe Warhawks softball
- Conference: Sun Belt Conference
- Record: 18–7 (4–1 Sun Belt)
- Head coach: Corey Lyon
- Assistant coach: Tina Schulz
- Pitching coach: Brittany Hile
- Home stadium: ULM Softball Complex

2015 Sun Belt Conference softball standings
	Conf.				Overall
Team	W		L	PCT	W		L	PCT
No. 11 Louisiana–Lafayette†^{y} ‍‍‍	20	–	3	.870	42	–	12	.778
No. 22 South Alabama ‍‍‡‍^{y}	16	–	4	.800	40	–	13	.755
Texas State ‍‍‍	14	–	6	.700	32	–	21	.604
Troy ‍‍‍	14	–	9	.609	32	–	23	.582
Georgia State ‍‍‍	14	–	10	.583	38	–	22	.633
Louisiana–Monroe ‍‍‍	10	–	12	.455	30	–	22	.577
Texas–Arlington ‍‍‍	8	–	15	.348	27	–	28	.491
Georgia Southern ‍‍‍	4	–	20	.167	12	–	39	.235
Appalachian State ‍‍‍	1	–	22	.043	14	–	35	.286
† – Conference champion ‡ – Tournament champion y – Invited to the NCAA tournament As of May 24, 2015; Rankings from USA Today/NFCA Coaches

The 2015 Louisiana–Monroe Warhawks softball team represents University of Louisiana at Monroe in the 2015 NCAA Division I softball season. The Warhawks compete in the Sun Belt Conference and are led by first-year head coach Corey Lyon. ULM plays its home games at the ULM Softball Complex in Monroe, LA.

== Roster ==
2015 Louisiana–Monroe Warhawks softball roster
Pitchers: 45 Emily Clay – Senior; 24 Kaitlyn Medlam – Junior; 15 Katie Worley - Sophomore; 27 Eron Milton - Junior	Catchers: 12 Taylor Scarpantonio – Junior; 14 Mandy Blackwell - Freshman; Infielders: 1 Taylor Anderson - "Sophomore"; 7 Shannyn Palazzo - Junior; 8 Callie Alford – Sophomore; 11 Kensey Caldwell - Freshman; 18 Lauren Coleman – Junior; 28 MeQuilla Franklin - Senior; 43 Taylor Thorpe - Freshman; 77 Mallory Koepke - Freshman	Outfielders: 2 Ashley Christy – Junior; 3 Bethany Horne - Junior; 5 Megan Litumbe - Freshman; 9 Morgan Brown - Freshman; 23 Jessica Clifton - Senior

== Schedule ==
2015 Louisiana–Monroe Warhawks softball game log
Regular season
February (14–5)

#	Date	Opponent	Site/stadium	Score	Overall record	SBC record
Lady Techsters Invitational (4–1)
1	February 5	vs. Louisiana Tech	Lady Techster Softball Complex	9–5	1–0	—
2	February 6	vs. Missouri State	Lady Techster Softball Complex	4–7	1–1	—
3	February 6	vs. Arkansas–Pine Bluff	Lady Techster Softball Complex	8–2	2–1	—
4	February 7	vs. Abilene Christian	Lady Techsters Softball Complex	8–2	3–1	—
5	February 7	vs. Southern Illinois-Edwardsville	Lady Techsters Softball Complex	4–3	4–1	—
Mardi Gras Classic (5–0)
6	February 13	Alabama State	ULM Softball Complex	10–2	5–1	—
7	February 13	S.E. Missouri State	ULM Softball Complex	11–3	6–1	—
8	February 14	Alabama State	ULM Softball Complex	3–1	7–1	—
9	February 14	Grambling State	ULM Softball Complex	8–0	8–1	—
10	February 15	Grambling State	ULM Softball Complex	10–2	9–1	—
11	February 18	at Northwestern State	Lady Demon Diamond	3–4	9–2	—
12	February 20	Delaware	ULM Softball Complex	7–5	10–2	—
13	February 20	Delaware	ULM Softball Complex	11–3	11–2	—
Central Arkansas Tournament (1–1)
14	February 21	vs. Central Arkansas	Farris Field	0–8	11–3	—
15	February 21	vs. Arkansas–Pine Bluff	Farris Field	13–5	12–3	—
16	February 24	Southeastern Louisiana	ULM Softball Complex	Canceled	12–3	—
2015 Alexis Park Resort Classic (2–3)
17	February 27	vs. Idaho State	Eller Media Stadium	3–1	13–3	—
18	February 27	vs. New Mexico State	Eller Media Stadium	6–7	13–4	—
19	February 28	vs. Wisconsin	Eller Media Stadium	9–8	14–4	—
20	February 28	vs. UNLV	Eller Media Stadium	1–2	14–5	—

March (4–2)

#	Date	Opponent	Site/stadium	Score	Overall record	SBC record
21	March 1	vs. Idaho State	Eller Media Stadium	2–4	14–6	—
22	March 4	Louisiana Tech	ULM Softball Complex	Canceled	—	—
23	March 7	Appalachian State	ULM Softball Complex	10–1	15–6	1–0
24	March 7	Appalachian State	ULM Softball Complex	6–5	16–6	2–0
25	March 8	Appalachian State	ULM Softball Complex	4–0	17–6	3–0
26	March 11	Incarnate Word	ULM Softball Complex	Canceled	—	—
27	March 11	Incarnate Word	ULM Softball Complex	Canceled	—	—
28	March 15	#23 South Alabama	ULM Softball Complex	8–0	18–6	4–0
29	March 15	#23 South Alabama	ULM Softball Complex	0–2	18–7	4–1
31	March 21	Texas State	ULM Softball Complex	Canceled	—	—
32	March 21	Texas State	ULM Softball Complex	L 0–9	—	—
33	March 22	Texas State	ULM Softball Complex	W 7–4	—	—
34	March 25	Central Arkansas	ULM Softball Complex	W 4–0	—	—
35	March 28	@ Georgia Southern	Eagle Field	W 8–6	—	—
36	March 29	@ Georgia Southern	Eagle Field	W 7–5	—	—
37	March 29	@ Georgia Southern	Eagle Field	W 6–0	—	—
38	March 31	@ #1 LSU	Tiger Park	L 3–7	—	—

April (0–0)

#	Date	Opponent	Site/stadium	Score	Overall record	SBC record
39	April 3	@ Troy	Troy Softball Complex	3:00 pm	—	—
40	April 3	@ Troy	Troy Softball Complex	5:00 pm	—	—
41	April 4	@ Troy	Troy Softball Complex	12:00 pm	—	—
42	April 8	@ Louisiana Tech	Lady Techster Softball Complex	6:00 pm	—	—
43	April 11	UT–Arlington	ULM Softball Complex	4:00 pm	—	—
44	April 11	UT–Arlington	ULM Softball Complex	6:00 pm	—	—
45	April 12	UT–Arlington	ULM Softball Complex	12:00 pm	—	—
46	April 15	@ Stephen F. Austin	Ladyjack Softball Field	2:00 pm	—	—
47	April 15	@ Stephen F. Austin	Ladyjack Softball Field	4:00 pm	—	—
48	April 22	@ Northwestern State	Lady Demon Diamond	6:00 pm	—	—
49	April 25	@ Georgia State	Robert E. Heck Softball Complex	2:00 pm	—	—
50	April 25	@ Georgia State	Robert E. Heck Softball Complex	4:00 pm	—	—
51	April 26	@ Georgia State	Robert E. Heck Softball Complex	1:00 pm	—	—

May (0–0)

#	Date	Opponent	Site/stadium	Score	Overall record	SBC record
52	May 2	UL–Lafayette	ULM Softball Complex	2:00 pm	—	—
53	May 2	UL–Lafayette	ULM Softball Complex	4:00 pm	—	—
54	May 3	UL–Lafayette	ULM Softball Complex	12:00 pm	—	—

2015 Sun Belt Conference softball tournament

#	Date	Opponent	Site/stadium	Score	Overall record	Tournament record
57	May 6–9	TBA	San Marcos, TX	—	—	—
