= 2026 Southland Conference softball tournament =

- Teams: 8
- Format: Double-elimination
- Finals site: Joe Miller Field at Cowgirl Diamond; Lake Charles, Louisiana
- Champions: McNeese (10th title)
- Winning coach: James Landreneau (5th title)
- MVP: Kassidy Chance (McNeese)

2026 Southland Conference softball standings
	Conf.				Overall
Team	W		L	PCT	W		L	PCT
Southeastern Louisiana ‍†‍‍^{y}	24	–	3	.889	46	–	16	.742
McNeese State ‍‍‡‍^{y}	18	–	9	.667	40	–	20	.667
Nicholls ‍‍‍	18	–	10	.643	36	–	23	.610
Incarnate Word ‍‍‍	17	–	10	.630	33	–	21	.611
Lamar ‍‍‍	16	–	11	.593	32	–	22	.593
Stephen F. Austin ‍‍‍	13	–	14	.481	31	–	28	.525
Northwestern State ‍‍‍	13	–	14	.481	24	–	29	.453
Texas A&M–Corpus Christi ‍‍‍	8	–	19	.296	14	–	38	.269
Houston Christian ‍‍‍	7	–	19	.269	10	–	36	.217
East Texas A&M ‍‍‍	1	–	25	.038	6	–	45	.118
† – Conference champion ‡ – Tournament champion y – Invited to the NCAA tournament As of May 17, 2026; Rankings from NFCA/USA Today

The 2026 Southland Conference softball tournament was held from April 30 through 3 and May 7 to 9. The top eight regular season finishers of the league's ten teams met in double-elimination tournaments held at the home fields of the #1 and #2 seeded teams. The finals were held at the home field of the highest remaining seeded team.The tournament was won by the McNeese Cowgirls, who earned the Southland Conference's automatic bid to the 2026 NCAA Division I softball tournament.

== Seeding and format ==
The top eight finishers from the regular season were seeded one through eight, and played a two bracket, double-elimination tournament. The bracket winners moved to the championship series, held at the home field of the highest remaining seeded team. Teams were seeded by record within the conference with a tie–breaker system to seed teams with identical conference records. The top eight teams in the conference qualified for the tournament.

Seed	School	Conference	Tie-breaker #1	Tie-breaker #2
1	Southeastern Louisiana	24–3		
2	McNeese	18–9		
3	Nicholls	17–10	2–1 vs. Incarnate Word	
4	Incarnate Word	17–10	1–2 vs. Nicholls	
5	Lamar	16–11		
6	Northwestern State	13–14	2–1 vs. Stephen F. Austin	
7	Stephen F. Austin	13–14	1–2 vs. Northwestern State	
8	Texas A&M–Corpus Christi	8–19		

Note: Houston Christian and East Texas A&M failed to qualify. New Orleans and UT Rio Grande Valley do not sponsor a softball team.

== Results ==
First round	Quarterfinals
4	Incarnate Word	5
5	Lamar	7
5	Lamar	2^{(8)}
1	Southeastern Louisiana	1
1	Southeastern Louisiana	8^{(6)}
8	Texas A&M–Corpus Christi	0
Hammond Bracket
4	Incarnate Word	9^{(5)}
8	Texas A&M–Corpus Christi	0
4	Incarnate Word	4
1	Southeastern Louisiana	6
3	Nicholls	7
6	Northwestern State	4
3	Nicholls	5
2	McNeese	6
2	McNeese	5
7	Stephen F. Austin	4
Lake Charles Bracket
6	Northwestern State	2
7	Stephen F. Austin	4^{(9)}
7	Stephen F. Austin	1
3	Nicholls	11^{(5)}

Semifinals
5	Lamar	2^{(8)}	—
1	Southeastern Louisiana	1	—
2	McNeese	7	—
3	Nicholls	6	—

Finals
5	Lamar	0	7	2
2	McNeese	1^{(10)}	6	10^{(5)}

== All Tournament Team ==
Player	Team
**Kassidy Chance**	Idaho State
Jada Muñoz	Idaho State
Maddie Weeks	Idaho State
Rylee Cloud	Idaho State
Meiko Dominguez	Idaho State
Maddie Taylor	Idaho State
Reagan Smith	Lamar
Isabella Flores	Lamar
Sicily Windham	Lamar
Gracee Hess	Lamar
Hallie Burns	Southeastern Louisiana
Claire Sisco	Nicholls

MVP in bold
