= 2015 Georgia State Panthers softball team =

American college softball season

2015 Georgia State Panthers softball
- Conference: Sun Belt Conference
- Record: 38–22 (14–10 SBC)
- Head coach: Roger Kincaid
- Home stadium: Robert E. Heck Baseball Complex

2015 Sun Belt Conference softball standings
| | Conf. | | | | Overall |
| Team | W | | L | PCT | W | | L | PCT |
|---|---|---|---|---|---|---|---|---|
| No. 11 Louisiana–Lafayette†^{y} ‍‍‍ | 20 | – | 3 | .870 | 42 | – | 12 | .778 |
| No. 22 South Alabama ‍‍‡‍^{y} | 16 | – | 4 | .800 | 40 | – | 13 | .755 |
| Texas State ‍‍‍ | 14 | – | 6 | .700 | 32 | – | 21 | .604 |
| Troy ‍‍‍ | 14 | – | 9 | .609 | 32 | – | 23 | .582 |
| Georgia State ‍‍‍ | 14 | – | 10 | .583 | 38 | – | 22 | .633 |
| Louisiana–Monroe ‍‍‍ | 10 | – | 12 | .455 | 30 | – | 22 | .577 |
| Texas–Arlington ‍‍‍ | 8 | – | 15 | .348 | 27 | – | 28 | .491 |
| Georgia Southern ‍‍‍ | 4 | – | 20 | .167 | 12 | – | 39 | .235 |
| Appalachian State ‍‍‍ | 1 | – | 22 | .043 | 14 | – | 35 | .286 |
† – Conference champion ‡ – Tournament champion y – Invited to the NCAA tournament As of May 24, 2015; Rankings from USA Today/NFCA Coaches

The 2015 Georgia State Panthers softball team represented Georgia State University in the 2015 NCAA Division I softball season. The Panthers competed in the Sun Belt Conference and were led by five-year head coach Roger Kincaid. Georgia State played its home games at the Robert E. Heck Softball Complex in Panthersville, Georgia.

== Schedule ==
2014 Georgia State Panthers Softball Game Log
Regular season
February

| # | Date | Opponent | Site/stadium | Score | Overall record | SBC record |
|---|---|---|---|---|---|---|
| 1 | February 12 | #17 Auburn | Auburn, AL | 8–20 | 0–1 | – |
| 2 | February 13 | Winthrop | Auburn, AL | 8–7 | 1–1 | – |
| 3 | February 13 | Ball State | Auburn, AL | 10–4 | 2–1 | – |
| 4 | February 14 | Eastern Illinois | Auburn, AL | 7–6 | 3–1 | – |
| 5 | February 18 | Auburn | Auburn, AL | 0–10 | 3–2 | – |
| 6 | February 20 | Savannah State | Bob Heck Field | 16–8 | 4–2 | – |
| 7 | February 20 | Savannah State | Bob Heck Field | 14–5 | 5–2 | – |
| 8 | February 21 | Mount St. Mary's | Bob Heck Field | 10–4 | 6–2 | – |
| 9 | February 21 | #21 Presbyterian | Bob Heck Field | 9–2 | 7–2 | – |
| 10 | February 27 | FGCU | Clearwater, FL | 16–2 | 8–2 | – |
| 11 | February 27 | Eastern Michigan | Clearwater, FL | 6–1 | 9–2 | – |

March

| # | Date | Opponent | Site/stadium | Score | Overall record | SBC record |
|---|---|---|---|---|---|---|
| 12 | March 1 | East Carolina | Clearwater, FL | 4–3 | 10–2 | – |
| 13 | March 1 | Villanova | Clearwater, FL | 5–2 | 11–2 | – |
| 14 | March 4 | Mercer | Macon, GA | 3–0 | 12–2 | – |
| 15 | March 4 | Mercer | Macon, GA | 8–5 | 13–2 | – |
| 16 | March 7 | Troy | Bob Heck Field | 15–3 | 14–2 | 1–0 |
| 17 | March 7 | Troy | Bob Heck Field | 4–0 | 15–2 | 2–0 |
| 18 | March 8 | Troy | Bob Heck Field | 4–3 | 16–2 | 3–0 |
| 19 | March 14 | Texas State | San Marcos, TX | 5–2 | 17–2 | 4–0 |
| 20 | March 14 | Texas State | San Marcos, TX | 13–4 | 18–2 | 5–0 |
| 21 | March 15 | Texas State | San Marcos, TX | 4–5 | 18–3 | 5–1 |
| 22 | March 17 | Chattanooga | Bob Heck Field | 4–2 | 19–3 | 5–1 |
| 23 | March 18 | #4 Alabama | Tuscaloosa, AL | 1–9 | 19–4 | 5–1 |
| 24 | March 20 | UMKC | Lawrence, KS | 10–2 | 20–4 | 5–1 |
| 25 | March 20 | Eastern Michigan | Lawrence, KS | 9–10 | 20–5 | 5–1 |
| 26 | March 21 | Eastern Michigan | Lawrence, KS | 9–3 | 21–5 | 5–1 |
| 27 | March 21 | #22 Kansas | Lawrence, KS | 6–8 | 21–6 | 5–1 |
| 28 | March 22 | #22 Kansas | Lawrence, KS | 4–5 | 21–7 | 5–1 |
| 29 | March 24 | Georgia Tech | Bob Heck Field | 7–6 | 22–7 | 5–1 |
| 30 | March 26 | Kennesaw State | Bob Heck Field | 11–3 | 23–7 | 5–1 |
| 31 | March 28 | #24 South Alabama | Bob Heck Field | 7–8 | 23–8 | 5–2 |
| 32 | March 28 | #24 South Alabama | Bob Heck Field | 11–13 | 23–9 | 5–3 |
| 33 | March 29 | #24 South Alabama | Bob Heck Field | 3–8 | 23–10 | 5–4 |

April

| # | Date | Opponent | Site/stadium | Score | Overall record | SBC record |
|---|---|---|---|---|---|---|
| 34 | April 1 | Furman | Bob Heck Field | 1–3 | 23–11 | 5–4 |
| 35 | April 1 | Furman | Bob Heck Field | 2–6 | 23–12 | 5–4 |
| 36 | April 3 | #10 Louisiana | Lafayette, LA | 1–10 | 23–13 | 5–5 |
| 37 | April 4 | #10 Louisiana | Lafayette, LA | 2–10 | 23–14 | 5–6 |
| 38 | April 4 | #10 Louisiana | Lafayette, LA | 0–8 | 23–15 | 5–7 |
| 39 | April 7 | Tennessee Tech | Bob Heck Field | 11–10 | 24–15 | 5–7 |
| 40 | April 7 | Tennessee Tech | Bob Heck Field | 12–1 | 25–15 | 5–7 |
| 41 | April 8 | Kennesaw State | Kennesaw, GA | 12–4 | 26–15 | 5–7 |
| 42 | April 11 | Appalachian State | Bob Heck Field | 2–1 | 27–15 | 6–7 |
| 43 | April 11 | Appalachian State | Bob Heck Field | 10–2 | 28–15 | 7–7 |
| 44 | April 12 | Appalachian State | Bob Heck Field | 5–14 | 28–16 | 7–8 |
| 45 | April 18 | UT Arlington | Arlington, TX | 6–1 | 29–16 | 8–8 |
| 46 | April 18 | UT Arlington | Arlington, TX | 2–5 | 29–17 | 8–9 |
| 47 | April 19 | UT Arlington | Arlington, TX | 5–4 | 30–17 | 9–9 |
| 48 | April 22 | #14 Georgia | Athens, GA | 6–14 | 30–18 | 9–9 |
| 49 | April 24 | ULM | Bob Heck Field | 11–2 | 31–18 | 10–9 |
| 50 | April 24 | ULM | Bob Heck Field | 10–8 | 32–18 | 11–9 |
| 51 | April 26 | ULM | Bob Heck Field | 3–6 | 32–19 | 11–10 |
| 52 | April 27 | #10 Florida State | Bob Heck Field | 3–6 | 32–20 | 11–10 |

May

| # | Date | Opponent | Site/stadium | Score | Overall record | SBC record |
|---|---|---|---|---|---|---|
| 53 | May 1 | Georgia Southern | Statesboro, GA | 4–1 | 33–20 | 12–10 |
| 54 | May 2 | Georgia Southern | Statesboro, GA | 19–6 | 34–20 | 13–10 |
| 55 | May 2 | Georgia Southern | Statesboro, GA | 10–7 | 35–20 | 14–10 |

Sun Belt Tournament

| # | Date | Opponent | Site/stadium | Score | Overall record | Tournament record |
|---|---|---|---|---|---|---|
| 56 | May 6 | Georgia Southern | San Marcos, TX | 8–0 | 36–20 | 14–10 |
| 57 | May 6 | Troy | San Marcos, TX | 9–3 | 37–20 | 14–10 |
| 58 | May 7 | #10 Louisiana | San Marcos, TX | 2–10 | 37–21 | 14–10 |
| 59 | May 8 | ULM | San Marcos, TX | 8–6 | 38–21 | 14–10 |
| 60 | May 8 | #23 South Alabama | San Marcos, TX | 1–3 | 38–22 | 14–10 |
