= 2026 Oklahoma Sooners softball team =

College softball season

2026 Oklahoma Sooners softball

SEC regular season champions NCAA Norman Regional champion
- Conference: Southeastern Conference
- Record: 52–10 (20–4 SEC)
- Head coach: Patty Gasso (32nd season)
- Assistant coaches: Jennifer Rocha; JT Gasso
- Home stadium: Love's Field

2026 Southeastern Conference softball standings
	Conf.				Overall
Team	W		L	PCT	W		L	PCT
No. 8 Oklahoma ‍†‍‍^{y}	20	–	4	.833	52	–	10	.839
No. 3 Alabama ‍‍‍^{y}	19	–	5	.792	56	–	9	.862
No. 9 Florida ‍‍‍^{y}	17	–	7	.708	52	–	12	.813
No. 1 Texas ‍‍‡‍^{y}	16	–	8	.667	53	–	12	.815
No. 4 Tennessee ‍‍‍^{y}	16	–	8	.667	49	–	12	.803
No. 20 Texas A&M ‍‍‍^{y}	16	–	8	.667	38	–	19	.667
No. 7 Arkansas ‍‍‍^{y}	15	–	9	.625	47	–	13	.783
No. 18 LSU ‍‍‍^{y}	13	–	11	.542	40	–	19	.678
No. 15 Georgia ‍‍‍^{y}	12	–	12	.500	41	–	20	.672
No. 10 Mississippi State ‍‍‍^{y}	9	–	15	.375	43	–	21	.672
Missouri ‍‍‍	9	–	15	.375	28	–	29	.491
South Carolina ‍‍‍^{y}	7	–	17	.292	32	–	28	.533
Ole Miss ‍‍‍^{y}	6	–	18	.250	36	–	26	.581
Auburn ‍‍‍	4	–	20	.167	27	–	28	.491
Kentucky ‍‍‍	1	–	23	.042	26	–	29	.473
† – Conference champion ‡ – Tournament champion y – Invited to the NCAA tournament As of June 4, 2026; Rankings from NFCA/USA Today

The 2026 Oklahoma Sooners softball team was an American college softball team that represented the University of Oklahoma during the 2026 NCAA Division I softball season. The team was coached by Patty Gasso in her thirty-second season, and played their home games at Love's Field.

== Previous season ==
The Sooners finished the 2025 season 52–9 overall, and 17–7 in the SEC, finishing in first place in their conference. Following the conclusion of the regular season, the Sooners were named 2025 SEC tournament co-champion, and received an automatic bid to the 2025 NCAA Division I softball tournament. They advanced to the semifinals of the 2025 Women's College World Series, before being eliminated by Texas Tech.

== Offseason ==
=== Departures ===
Oklahoma outgoing transfers
Player	Position	Year	New team	Ref
Maya Bland	Outfielder	Junior	Texas A&M	
Sophia Bordi	Pitcher	Sophomore	Texas	
Hannah Coor	Outfielder	Redshirt senior	Nebraska	
Corri Hicks	Catcher	Sophomore	Clemson	
Kadey Lee McKay	Infielder	Sophomore	North Texas	
Paytn Monticelli	Pitcher	Senior	LSU	

=== Additions ===
Oklahoma incoming transfers
Player	Position	Year	Previous team	Ref
Sydney Berzon	Pitcher	Senior	LSU	
Miali Guachino	Pitcher	Sophomore	Ole Miss	

== Roster and personnel ==
2026 Oklahoma Sooners roster
Pitchers: 11 – Kierston Deal – Senior; 19 – Berkley Zache – Freshman; 24 – Audrey Lowry – Sophomore; 29 – Sydney Berzon – Senior; 99 – Miali Guachino – Sophomore; Catchers: 1 – Kendall Wells – Freshman; 13 – Isabela Emerling – Redshirt Senior; Outfielders: 3 – Chaney Helton – Sophomore; 7 – Kasidi Pickering – Junior; 16 – Abigale Dayton – Senior; 22 – Kai Minor – Freshman; 77 – Sydney Barker – Sophomore	Infielders: 2 – Nelly McEnroe-Marinas – Redshirt Sophomore; 12 – Lexi McDaniel – Freshman; 14 – Riley Zache – Sophomore; 42 – Gabbie Garcia – Sophomore; 55 – Jerrell Mailo – Freshman; Utility: 00 – Allyssa Parker – Freshman; 5 – Ella Parker – Junior; 9 – Tia Milloy – Sophomore; 50 – Ailana Agbayani – Senior

2026 Oklahoma Sooners coaching staff
- Patty Gasso – Head coach
- Jennifer Rocha – Associate head coach
- JT Gasso – Associate head coach
- Falepolima Steele – Assistant coach
- Karlie Keeney - Interim Coach
- Jackie Livingston - Director of Operations
- Ryan Wondrasek – Director of Player Development

== Schedule ==
2026 Oklahoma Sooners softball game log
Regular season (48–7)

February (18–2)
Date	Opponent	Rank	Site	Score	Win	Loss	Save	Attendance	Overall Record	SEC Record
February 5	Arizona State	No. 3	Alberta B. Farrington Softball Stadium; Tempe, AZ	2–1	**Lowry** (1–0)	Brown (0–1)	**Guachino** (1)	2,373	1–0	–
February 6	at No. 17 Arizona; Candrea Classic	No. 3	Mike Candrea Field; Tucson, AZ	6–11	Adams (2–0)	**Berzon** (0–1)	—	2,640	1–1	–
February 7	at No. 17 Arizona; Candrea Classic	No. 3	Mike Candrea Field	21–3 ^{(5)}	**Lowry** (2–0)	Wright (1–1)	—	2,809	2–1	–
February 8	at No. 17 Arizona; Candrea Classic	No. 3	Mike Candrea Field	5–4	**Lowry** (3–0)	Adams (2–1)	—	2,466	3–1	–
February 13	vs. Montana; New Mexico Tournament	No. 4	NM State Softball Complex; Las Cruces, NM	17–0 ^{(5)}	**Guachino** (1–0)	Elias (1–2)	—	762	4–1	—
February 13	at New Mexico State; New Mexico Tournament	No. 4	NM State Softball Complex	18-6 ^{(5)}	**Lowry** (4–0)	Mancha (0–1)	—	978	5–1	—
February 14	vs. Minnesota; New Mexico Tournament	No. 4	NM State Softball Complex	12–2 ^{(5)}	**Guachino** (2–0)	Susa (0–2)	—	862	6–1	—
February 14	vs. Idaho State; New Mexico Tournament	No. 4	NM State Softball Complex	10–1 ^{(5)}	**Lowry** (5–0)	Tommasini (0–2)	—	791	7–1	—
February 15	at UTEP	No. 4	Helen of Troy Softball Complex; El Paso, TX	34–0 ^{(5)}	**Lowry** (6–0)	Presswood (0–1)	—	961	8–1	—
February 19	vs. Cal State Fullerton; Mary Nutter Collegiate Classic	No. 5	Big League Dreams Complex; Cathedral City, CA	6–5 ^{(8)}	**Lowry** (7–0)	McCleskey (3–5)	—	—	9–1	—
February 19	vs. San Diego State; Mary Nutter Collegiate Classic	No. 5	Big League Dreams Complex	10–2 ^{(5)}	**Guachino** (3–0)	Pu'a (1–1)	—	—	10–1	—
February 20	vs. No. 14 Duke; Mary Nutter Collegiate Classic	No. 5	Big League Dreams Complex	11–1 ^{(6)}	**Lowry** (8–0)	Wheeler (3–2)	—	—	11–1	—
February 21	vs. Long Beach State; Mary Nutter Collegiate Classic	No. 5	Big League Dreams Complex	4–6	Lopetgui (2–2)	**Lowry** (8–1)	Cowans (1)	—	11–2	—
February 21	vs. California; Mary Nutter Collegiate Classic	No. 5	Big League Dreams Complex	13–10	**Berzon** (1–1)	Waiters (0–2)	—	—	12–2	—
February 22	vs. Washington; Mary Nutter Collegiate Classic	No. 5	Big League Dreams Complex	14–4 ^{(5)}	**Guachino** (4–0)	Maddox (1–2)	—	1,500	13–2	—
February 26	Alabama State	No. 6	Love's Field; Norman, OK	32–0 ^{(5)}	**Parker** (1–0)	Pousson (3–2)	—	3,766	14–2	—
February 27	Sam Houston	No. 6	Love's Field	13–3 ^{(5)}	**Lowry** (9–1)	Abke (4–1)	—	—	15–2	—
February 27	Alabama State	No. 6	Love's Field	23–3 ^{(5)}	**Guachino** (5–0)	Hill (3–1)	—	3,921	16–2	—
February 28	Sam Houston	No. 6	Love's Field	10–2 ^{(5)}	**Berzon** (2–1)	Sanchez (4–3)	—	—	17–2	—
February 28	Alabama State	No. 6	Love's Field	29–6 ^{(5)}	**Deal** (1–0)	Quinnie (1–4)	—	4,199	18–2	—

March (17–1)
Date	Opponent	Rank	Site	Score	Win	Loss	Save	Attendance	Overall Record	SEC Record
March 1	Southeastern Louisiana	No. 6	Love's Field	9–1 ^{(5)}	**Lowry** (10–1)	Burns (4–3)	—	3,837	19–2	—
March 3	at North Texas	No. 6	Lovelace Stadium; Denton, TX	16–4 ^{(5)}	**Guachino** (6–0)	Lewinski (5–6)	—	468	20–2	—
March 7	Abilene Christian; Okana Invitational	No. 6	Love's Field	8–0 ^{(6)}	**Parker** (2–0)	Snipes (0–3)	—	—	21–2	—
March 7	Louisiana; Okana Invitational	No. 6	Love's Field	10–0 ^{(5)}	**Lowry** (11–1)	Hoover (3–4)	—	3,909	22–2	—
March 8	Louisiana; Okana Invitational	No. 6	Love's Field	2–1	**Guachino** (7–0)	Noble (5–2)	**Lowry** (1)	—	23–2	—
March 8	Abilene Christian; Okana Invitational	No. 6	Love's Field	9–0 ^{(5)}	**Berzon** (3–1)	Meyer (6–0)	—	3,754	24–2	—
March 11	Tulsa	No. 6	Love's Field	12–1 ^{(5)}	**Parker** (3–0)	Moore (3–7)	—	3,736	25–2	—
March 13	Auburn	No. 6	Love's Field	13–5 ^{(6)}	**Lowry** (12–1)	Herndon (4–2)	—	4,046	26–2	1–0
March 14	Auburn	No. 6	Love's Field	8–5	**Parker** (4–0)	Harrison (8–4)	—	4,390	27–2	2–0
March 15	Auburn	No. 6	Love's Field	14–2	**Lowry** (13–1)	Herndon (4–3)	—	3,914	28–2	3–0
March 18	at Memphis	No. 6	Tigers Softball Complex; Memphis, TN	15–0 ^{(5)}	**Berzon** (4–1)	Tate (2–7)	—	551	29–2	—
March 21	at Ole Miss	No. 6	Ole Miss Softball Complex; Oxford, MS	10–0 ^{(6)}	**Lowry** (14–1)	Aycock (8–5)	—	1,707	30–2	4–0
March 22	at Ole Miss	No. 6	Ole Miss Softball Complex	14–2 ^{(5)}	**Guachino** (8–0)	Boyer (6–7)	—	1,703	31–2	5–0
March 23	at Ole Miss	No. 6	Ole Miss Softball Complex	5–2	**Lowry** (15–1)	Aycock (8–6)	—	1,329	32–2	6–0
March 27	at No. 20 LSU	No. 5	Tiger Park; Baton Rouge, LA	3–2	**Guachino** (9–0)	Heavener (7–7)	—	2,065	33–2	7–0
March 28	at No. 20 LSU	No. 5	Tiger Park	1–3	Heavener (8–6)	**Parker** (4–1)	—	2,280	33–3	7–1
March 29	at No. 20 LSU	No. 5	Tiger Park	8–4	**Guachino** (10–0)	Cellura (4–4)	—	1,928	34–3	8–1
March 31	Wichita State	No. 3	Love's Field	12–3 ^{(6)}	**Lowry** (16–1)	Sanders (4–4)	—	3,861	35–3	—

April (11–3)
Date	Opponent	Rank	Site	Score	Win	Loss	Save	Attendance	Overall Record	SEC Record
April 2	Kentucky	No. 3	Love's Field	10–2 ^{(5)}	**Lowry** (17–1)	Hammond (2–3)	—	3,843	36–3	9–1
April 3	Kentucky	No. 3	Love's Field	9–1 ^{(5)}	**Guachino** (11–0)	Haendiges (9–6)	—	3,835	37–3	10–1
April 4	Kentucky	No. 3	Love's Field	12–2 ^{(5)}	**Berzon** (5–1)	Haendiges (9–7)	—	4,103	38–3	11–1
April 10	at No. 4 Texas	No. 2	Red and Charline McCombs Field; Austin, TX	3–0	**Lowry** (18–1)	Kavan (15–3)	—	2,199	39–3	12–1
April 11	at No. 4 Texas	No. 2	Red and Charline McCombs Field	4–3	**Guachino** (12–0)	Gutierrez (5–1)	**Lowry** (2)	2,209	40–3	13–1
April 12	at No. 4 Texas	No. 2	Red and Charline McCombs Field	6–8 (8)	Gutierrez (6–1)	**Lowry** (18–2)	—	2,380	40–4	13–2
April 15	vs. No. 21 Oklahoma State	No. 1	Devon Park; Oklahoma City, OK	4–6	Meylan (18–6)	**Guachino** (12–1)	—	7,826	40–5	—
April 17	No. 8 Arkansas	No. 1	Love's Field	8–7	**Lowry** (19–2)	Timmerman (8–1)	**Parker** (1)	4,468	41–5	14–2
April 18	No. 8 Arkansas	No. 1	Love's Field	2–3	Burnham (10–3)	**Berzon** (5–2)	Herron (4)	4,526	41–6	14–3
April 19	No. 8 Arkansas	No. 1	Love's Field	11–1 ^{(5)}	**Parker** (5–1)	Herron (12–4)	—	4,542	42–6	15–3
April 21	Arkansas–Pine Bluff	No. 1	Love's Field	9–0 ^{(5)}	**Deal** (2–0)	Stewart (2–4)	—	3,784	43–6	—
April 24	No. 15 Georgia	No. 1	Love's Field	10–2 ^{(6)}	**Lowry** (20–2)	Fisher (10–5)	—	4,298	44–6	16–3
April 25	No. 15 Georgia	No. 1	Love's Field	3–1	**Guachino** (13–1)	Roelling (14–7)	—	4,504	45–6	17–3
April 26	No. 15 Georgia	No. 1	Love's Field	6–5	**Guachino** (14–1)	Roelling (14–8)	—	4,302	46–6	18–3

May (2–1)
Date	Opponent	Rank	Site	Score	Win	Loss	Save	Attendance	Overall Record	SEC Record
May 1	at No. 14 Texas A&M	No. 1	Davis Diamond; College Station, TX	5–8	Peters (14–5)	**Guachino** (14–2)	—	2,184	46–7	18–4
May 2	at No. 14 Texas A&M	No. 1	Davis Diamond	4–3	**Lowry** (21–2)	Munnerlyn (3–5)	—	2,409	47–7	19–4
May 2	at No. 14 Texas A&M	No. 1	Davis Diamond	6–4	**Berzon** (6–2)	Lessentine (14–4)	**Lowry** (3)	2,409	48–7	20–4

Postseason (4–3)

SEC Tournament (0–1)
Date	Opponent	Rank	Site	Score	Win	Loss	Save	Attendance	Overall Record	Tournament Record
May 7	(8) No. 17 Georgia	(1) No. 1	John Cropp Stadium; Lexington, KY	5–10	Harrison (4–0)	**Lowry** (21–3)	—	2,069	48–8	0–1

Norman Regional (3–0)
Date	Opponent	Rank	Site	Score	Win	Loss	Save	Attendance	Overall record	Regional record
May 15	vs. Binghamton	No. 2	Love's Field	11–0 ^{(5)}	**Zache** (1–0)	Kennedy (8–9)	—	4,036	49–8	1–0
May 16	vs. Kansas	No. 2	Love's Field	9–0 ^{(5)}	**Guachino** (15–2)	Barber (9–8)	—	—	50–8	2–0
May 17	vs. Michigan	No. 2	Love's Field	8–1	**Lowry** (22–3)	Ellis (15–9)	—	3,947	51–8	3–0

Norman Super Regional (1–2)
Date	Opponent	Rank	Site	Score	Win	Loss	Save	Attendance	Overall record	Super Reg. record
May 22	vs. Mississippi State	No. 2	Love's Field	9–11	Everett (2–1)	**Lowry** (22–4)	—	3,966	51–9	0–1
May 23	vs. Mississippi State	No. 2	Love's Field	7–1	**Lowry** (23–4)	Goold (15–11)	—	4,146	52–9	1–1
May 24	vs. Mississippi State	No. 2	Love's Field	0–6	Everett (3–1)	**Guachino** (15–3)	—	4,250	52–10	1–2

- Win
- Loss
- Postponement
- Bold: Sooners team member
- Rankings from NFCA:
- (#) Tournament seedings in parentheses.

== Record vs. conference opponents ==
. Blank are not scheduled. Blue are home games, otherwise away.

2026 SEC softball records Source: 2026 SEC softball game results, 2026 SEC softball schedule
Tm	W–L	ALA	ARK	AUB	FLA	UGA	KEN	LSU	MSU	MIZ	OKL	OMS	SCA	TEN	TEX	TAM	Tm	SR	SW
ALA	19–5		2–1	3–0	.	.	3–0	.	.	2–1	.	3–0	3–0	1–2	2–1	.	ALA	7–1	4–0
ARK	15–9	1–2		3–0	2–1	2–1	.	.	2–1	2–1	1–2	.	.	.	2–1	.	ARK	6–2	1–0
AUB	4–20	0–3	0–3		1–2	.	2–1	0–3	.	0–3	0–3	1–2	.	.	.	.	AUB	1–7	0–5
FLA	17–7	.	1–2	2–1		1–2	3–0	.	2–1	3–0	.	.	3–0	2–1	.	.	FLA	6–2	3–0
UGA	12–12	.	1–2	.	2–1		3–0	.	2–1	2–1	0–3	.	.	.	1–2	1–2	UGA	4–4	1–1
KEN	1–23	0–3	.	1–2	0–3	0–3		.	.	.	0–3	.	.	0–3	0–3	0–3	KEN	0–8	0–7
LSU	13–11	.	.	3–0	.	.	.		1–2	2–1	1–2	3–0	2–1	0–3	.	1–2	LSU	4–4	2–1
MSU	9–15	.	1–2	.	1–2	1–2	.	2–1		.	.	1–2	2–1	1–2	.	0–3	MSU	2–6	0–1
MIZ	9–15	1–2	1–2	3–0	0–3	1–2	.	1–2	.		.	.	1–2	1–2	.	.	MIZ	1–7	1–1
OKL	20–4	.	2–1	3–0	.	3–0	3–0	2–1	.	.		3–0	.	.	2–1	2–1	OKL	8–0	4–0
OMS	6–18	0–3	.	2–1	.	.	.	0–3	2–1	.	0–3		.	2–1	0–3	0–3	OMS	3–5	0–5
SCA	7–17	0–3	.	.	0–3	.	.	1–2	1–2	2–1	.	.		1–2	0–3	2–1	SCA	2–6	0–3
TEN	16–8	2–1	.	.	1–2	.	3–0	3–0	2–1	2–1	.	1–2	2–1		.	.	TEN	6–2	2–0
TEX	16–8	1–2	1–2	.	.	2–1	3–0	.	.	.	1–2	3–0	3–0	.		2–1	TEX	6–2	3–0
TAM	16–8	.	.	.	.	2–1	3–0	2–1	3–0	.	1–2	3–0	1–2	.	1–2		TAM	5–3	3–0
Tm	W–L	ALA	ARK	AUB	FLA	UGA	KEN	LSU	MSU	MIZ	OKL	OMS	SCA	TEN	TEX	TAM	Team	SR	SW

Updated for entire regular season.
Tie breakers: TEX>TEN>TAM, SCA common. MSU>MIZ, FLA common.

== Rankings ==
Ranking movements Legend: ██ Increase in ranking ██ Decrease in ranking т = Tied with team above or below
	Week															
Poll	Pre	1	2	3	4	5	6	7	8	9	10	11	12	13	14	Final
NFCA / USA Today	3	4т	5	6	6	6	6	5	3	2	1	1	1	1	2	
Softball America	3	4	4	7	6	6	5	5	3	3	1	2	1	1		
ESPN.com/USA Softball	3	4	4	5	4	4	4	3	3	2	1	1	1	1	4	
D1Softball	3	4	4	5	4	4	5	5	3	2	1	1	1	1		
