= Brittany Miller (softball) =

Current position
- Conference: Southland

Biographical details
- Born: July 21, 1987 (age 39); Garden Grove, California, United States
- Education: University of Iowa

Playing career
- 2006-2009: Iowa
- Position: Pitcher

Coaching career (HC unless noted)
- 2010–2011: North Dakota State (graduate asst.)
- 2012: North Dakota State (asst.)
- 2013–2016: Iowa State (asst.)
- 2017–2021: Loyola Marymount (asst.)
- 2020–2022: Texas Tech (asst.)
- 2023–2026: East Texas A&M

Head coaching record
- Overall: 34—172

Accomplishments and honors

Awards
- All-American NFCA DI second-team (2009); First-team NFCA DI All-Midwest Region (2008, 2009); Second-team NFCA DI All-Midwest Region (2007); First team All-Big Ten (2009); Second-team All-Big Ten (2007, 2008); Third-team All-Big Ten (2006)

Brittany Miller (born July 21, 1987) is an American college softball coach and former pitcher. Prior to her position at Texas A&M–Commerce, she served as assistant coach for two seasons at Texas Tech. Prior to that, she was an assistant coach at Loyola Marymount for four seasons. Before her Loyola Marymount years, she was an assistant coach at Iowa State. She began her coaching career at North Dakota State, first as a graduate assistant for two years and an assistant coach for one year. Miller served as the head coach at East Texas A&M Lions softball team from 2023-2026.

== Playing career ==
=== High school ===
Miller played varsity softball at Pacifica High School in Garden Grove, California. She earned first team all-league, all-county, and all-California Interscholastic Federation (CIF) honors all four years.

=== College ===
Miller played softball for the Iowa Hawkeyes softball team from 2006 to 2009. She was named the Hawkeyes Most Valuable Player all four seasons; the only pitcher to do so. She was named an all-Big Ten Conference selection four times. She was named to the NFCA All-Region three years. She was also named Big Ten Pitcher of the Year two times. At the conclusion of her senior season, she was named an NFCA second team All-American.

=== Professional ===
Miller played professionally for the Akron Racers, and was the seventh player selected in the 2009 National Pro Fastpitch senior draft with the Akron Racers.[6]

== Coaching career ==
=== Assistant coach ===
Miller served as assistant coach at four programs. She began her career at North Dakota State as a graduate assistant for the first two years. She was an assistant coach for the Bison in 2012. She served as an assistant coach at Iowa State for the next four years from 2013 to 2016. Following her Iowa State years, she served as an assistant at Loyola Marymount for four years (from 2017 to 2020). After Loyola Marymount, she was an assistant coach for the Texas Tech Red Raiders softball program.

=== Head coach ===
Miller was named Texas A&M–Commerce head softball coach on June 24, 2022. Miller and East Texas A&M parted ways after four seasons, in which she compiled an overall record of 34-172, never winning more than 10 games in any season.

== See also ==
- East Texas A&M Lions softball
