= 2015 Sun Belt Conference softball tournament =

2015 Sun Belt Conference softball standings
	Conf.				Overall
Team	W		L	PCT	W		L	PCT
No. 11 Louisiana–Lafayette†^{y} ‍‍‍	20	–	3	.870	42	–	12	.778
No. 22 South Alabama ‍‍‡‍^{y}	16	–	4	.800	40	–	13	.755
Texas State ‍‍‍	14	–	6	.700	32	–	21	.604
Troy ‍‍‍	14	–	9	.609	32	–	23	.582
Georgia State ‍‍‍	14	–	10	.583	38	–	22	.633
Louisiana–Monroe ‍‍‍	10	–	12	.455	30	–	22	.577
Texas–Arlington ‍‍‍	8	–	15	.348	27	–	28	.491
Georgia Southern ‍‍‍	4	–	20	.167	12	–	39	.235
Appalachian State ‍‍‍	1	–	22	.043	14	–	35	.286
† – Conference champion ‡ – Tournament champion y – Invited to the NCAA tournament As of May 24, 2015; Rankings from USA Today/NFCA Coaches

The 2015 Sun Belt Conference softball tournament was held at the Bobcat Softball Complex on the campus of the Texas State University in San Marcos, Texas, from May 6 through May 9, 2015. The tournament winner earned the Sun Belt Conference's automatic bid to the 2015 NCAA Division I softball tournament. Day one of the tournament acted as a single elimination tournament, while Day 2 bggan a double elimination format among the remaining 4 teams. The championship game was winner takes all. Days 1 & 2 of the tournament were streamed via sunbeltsports.org. Days 3 and 4 of the tournament (semifinals & championship) were televised on ESPN3.

== Tournament ==
=== Day One Bracket 1 ===
1st Round			2nd Round
			4	Troy	3
			5	Georgia State	9
5	Georgia State	8	5	Georgia State	9
8	Georgia Southern	0^{(5)}

=== Day One Bracket 2 ===
1st Round			2nd Round
			3	Texas State	0
			6	Louisiana–Monroe	3
6	Louisiana–Monroe	6	6	Louisiana–Monroe	3
7	UT Arlington	1

=== Days Two-Four ===
3rd Round
1	Louisiana-Lafayette	10
5	Georgia State	2^{(6)}
2	South Alabama	6
6	Louisiana-Monroe	2
Lower round 1
5	Georgia State	8
6	Louisiana-Monroe	6

Semifinals
1	Louisiana-Lafayette	6
2	South Alabama	3
Lower final
2	South Alabama	3
5	Georgia State	1

Championship
1	Louisiana-Lafayette	0	–
2	South Alabama	2	–

- All times listed are Central Daylight Time.

== Broadcasters ==
- Day 1: Dan McDonald (sunbeltsports.org)
