= St. Edward's Hilltoppers =

Intercollegiate sports teams of St. Edward's University

- University: St. Edward's University
- Nickname: Hilltoppers
- NCAA: Division II
- Conference: LSC (primary)
- Athletic director: Dr. Jim Sarra
- Location: Austin, Texas, U.S.
- Varsity teams: 14 (5 men's, 7 women's, 2 co-ed)
- Basketball arena: Recreation and Athletics Center
- Baseball stadium: Lucian-Hamilton Field
- Softball stadium: Diane Daniels Field
- Soccer stadium: Lewis-Chen Family Field
- Colors: Navy and Vegas gold
- Mascot: Mountain goat
- Website: gohilltoppers.com
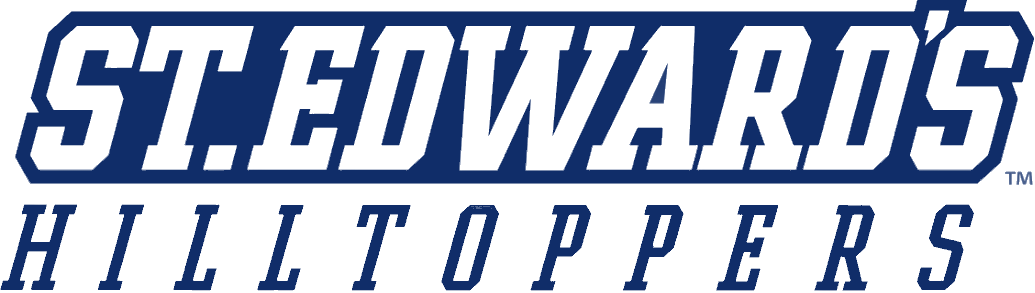

The St. Edward's Hilltoppers are the athletic teams that represent St. Edward's University, located in Austin, Texas, United States, in NCAA Division II intercollegiate sporting competitions. Generally, both men's and women's teams are referred to as the Hilltoppers, and the mascot is a mountain goat named "Topper the Goat". Throughout the program's history, the Hilltoppers have been members of four athletic conferences and currently compete as members of the Lone Star Conference for all twelve active NCAA varsity sports teams and two active non-NCAA co-ed teams. There are also five sports teams that are no longer active - football, men's and women's golf, and men's and women's tennis.

Prior to being referred to as the Hilltoppers, the teams of St. Edward's university were at various times nicknamed as the Saints, Tigers, and Crusaders before rebranding as the Hilltoppers after World War II.

== History ==
As of Fall 2014, the Hilltopper varsity athletic teams made 29 NCAA Tournament appearances over the last five seasons. Since joining the NCAA in 1999, the Hilltopper teams have won 55 Heartland Conference Championships. In 2008–2009, five St. Edward's athletes were named All-American, and 56 individuals were named to the All-Heartland Conference Team. St. Edward's men's soccer team was the Heartland Conference Champions in 2009. The women's soccer team has been very successful since 2006, posting winning records each season, and being selected to the NCAA Tournament 6 out of 7 years.

The university's official spirit group is the HillRaisers. The university's student-athlete graduation rate of 88% is fourth highest in the nation out of 270 Division II institutions. The Dallas Cowboys football team used the campus for pre-season training from 1990 to 1997.

=== Early history ===
In late 1926, St. Edward's joined the Texas Conference, where they competed until late 1939, when the university discontinued intercollegiate athletics. During the pre-World War II era, St. Edward's teams had at least three different nicknames: Saints, Tigers, and Crusaders.

=== Present era ===
In April 2020, St. Edward's abruptly discontinued five NCAA Division II programs: men’s and women’s golf, men’s and women’s tennis and men’s soccer, while also downgrading its cheer squad to a club sport.

== Conference History ==
The Hilltoppers have been members of four athletic conferences since 1928 and periodically independent since at least 1902.

- Independent, 1902-1928
- Texas Conference, 1928-1952
- Big State Conference, 1952-1987
- Heart of Texas Conference, 1987-1999
- Heartland Conference, 1999-2019
- Lone Star Conference, 2019-Present

== Athletic Directors ==
Publicly available historical information about St. Edward's athletic directors in incomplete prior to 2002.

Name	Years Served
Unknown	1902–1920
William Jennings Gardner	1920–1921
Unknown	1921–1939
Ed Fleming	1939–1942
Unknown	1942–1961
Tom Hamilton	1961–1973
Dr. John Knorr	1978–2002
Debbie Taylor	2002–2024
Jim Sarrá	2024–present

Ed Norris and Lucian Blersch served separately as athletic directors for an unknown time period prior to 2002.

== Varsity teams ==
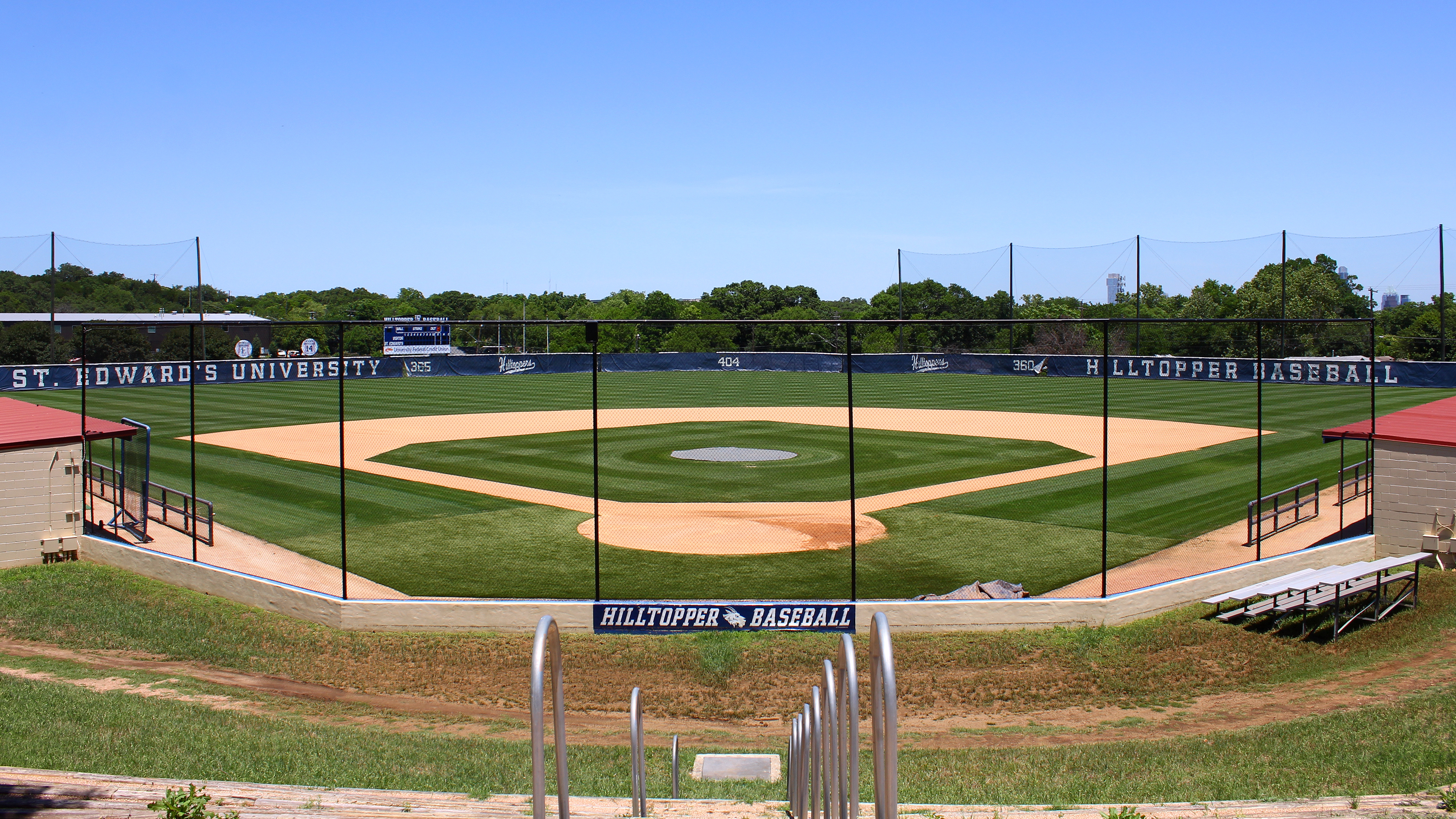
Lucian Hamilton Field, SEU's baseball venue

Men's sports	Women's sports
Baseball	Basketball
Basketball	Cross country
Cross country	Soccer
Soccer	Softball
Track and Field	STUNT
	Track and Field
	Volleyball

=== Baseball ===
The Hilltoppers baseball team was established in 1902 and plays home games at Lucian-Hamilton Field. The team is coached by Ryan Femath, who has led the program since the summer of 2023. As of 2026, the team has an all time record of 1819 wins to 1494 losses and 11 ties.

==== Championships and Titles ====
- Regular Season Titles: 1952, 1969, 1990, 2007, 2009, 2014, 2015, 2016, 2018
- Conference Championships: 2013, 2014, 2015, 2016, 2017, 2018
- NCAA National Qualifiers: 2007 2013, 2014, 2015, 2016, 2017, 2018, 2022, 2023, 2025

=== Basketball ===
The Hilltoppers field both men's and women's basketball teams, both of which play home games at the Recreation and Athletics Center. The men's team was established in 1921 under head coach Jack Meagher, and is currently coached by Andre Cook, who has led the program since 2009. The women's team was later established in 1974 under head coach Diane Daniels, and is currently coached by J.J. Riehl, who has led the program since 2012.

==== Men's Championships and Titles ====
- Regular Season Titles: 1953, 1963, 1970, 1985, 1986, 1993, 2005, 2006, 2007, 2018
- Conference Championships: 2005, 2006
- NCAA National Qualifiers: 2005, 2006, 2007, 2018, 2019, 2024

==== Women's Championships and Titles ====
- Regular Season Titles: 1987, 1988, 1990, 1991, 1992, 1993, 1997, 1998, 2006
- Conference Championships: 2014, 2017
- NAIA National Qualifiers: 1991, 1992, 1993, 1999
- NCAA National Qualifiers: 2014, 2017

=== Cross Country ===
The Hilltoppers operate both men's and women's cross country teams, which are unified under a single coaching staff. The men's program has been active since at least 1961 and the women's team was formed in 1985 along with the introduction of the unified coaching staff under head coach John Pearcy.

==== Men's Championships and Titles ====
- District Championships: 1989, 1990
- Conference Championships: 2006
- National Qualifiers: 1968, 1986, 1989, 1990

==== Women's Championships and Titles ====
- District Championships: 1987, 1990
- Conference Championships:
- National Qualifiers: 1986, 1987, 1990

=== Soccer ===
The Hilltoppers field both men's and women's soccer teams, both of which play home games at the Lewis-Chen Family Field. The men's team was established in 1985 under head coach Manuel Juarez, and is currently coached by Brian young, who has led the program since 2004. The women's team was later established in 1990 under head coach Mike Smith, and is currently coached by Nick Cowell, who has led the program since 2006.

The men's program was temporarily suspended from 2020-2022 for factors related to the COVID-19 Pandemic.

==== Men's Championships and Titles ====
- Regular Season Titles: 1994, 1999, 2000, 2009, 2012, 2013, 2014, 2015, 2016
- Conference Championships: 2014, 2015, 2016
- NAIA National Qualifiers: 1990, 1992, 1996, 1998
- NCAA National Qualifiers: 1999, 2014, 2015, 2016, 2017

==== Women's Championships and Titles ====
- Regular Season Titles: 2004, 2006, 2007, 2010, 2012, 2013, 2014, 2015, 2016, 2018
- Conference Championships: 2004, 2011, 2014
- NAIA National Qualifiers: 1991, 1992, 1993
- NCAA National Qualifiers: 2006, 2007, 2008, 2009, 2010, 2011, 2012, 2013, 2014, 2015, 2016, 2019

=== Softball ===
The Hilltoppers women's softball team was established in 1989 under head coach Phil Koehler and plays home games at the Lewis-Chen Family Field. The team is coached by Hailey Post, who has led the program since 2024. As of 2026, the team has an all-time record of 96 wins to 876 losses and 1 tie.

==== Championships and Titles ====
- Regular Season Titles: 1992, 1995, 1999, 2006, 2007, 2009, 2010
- Conference Championships: 2009, 2012
- NAIA National Qualifiers: 1999
- NCAA National Qualifiers: 2006, 2007, 2008, 2009, 2012, 2013, 2014, 2023

=== STUNT ===
The Hilltoppers women's STUNT team was established in 2025 under head coach Sean Garland and finished its inaugural season with a record of 4 wins and 15 losses.

=== Track and Field ===
The Hilltoppers operate both men's and women's Track & Field teams, which are unified under a single coaching staff. The men's program likely began in 1923 under head coach Jack Meagher and was reinstated twice from 1928-1943 and 1952-1974. In recent years, the teams have not competed in meets at a home facility.

==== Championships and Titles ====
- Conference Championships: 1962, 1967, 1968, 1970

=== Volleyball ===
The Hilltoppers women's volleyball team was established in 1974 under head coach Diane Daniels and plays home games at the recreation and athletics center. The team is coached by Jeremy Garcia, who has led the program since 2025. As of 2026, the team has an all time record of 893 wins to 717 losses and 7 ties.

==== Championships and Titles ====
- Regular Season Titles: 1985, 1991, 1996, 1997, 2001, 2003, 2004, 2008, 2009, 2010, 2011
- Conference Championships: 2001, 2003, 2004
- NAIA National Qualifiers: 1985, 1994, 1995, 1996, 1998
- NCAA National Qualifiers: 2002, 2003, 2004, 2011

=== Defunct Varsity Teams ===
==== Golf ====
The Hilltoppers men's and women's golf teams debuted their first seasons in 1949 and 2003, respectively, and were both disbanded in April 2020 due to factors relating to the COVID-19 pandemic. The men's team played its final season under head coach Chris Hill and the women's team played all seasons from formation to disbanding under head coach Jennifer McNeil.

==== Men's Championships and Titles ====
- Conference Championships: 2005, 2007, 2008, 2010, 2014
- NCAA National Qualifiers: 2004, 2005, 2006, 2007, 2008, 2009, 2010, 2011, 2012, 2013, 2014, 2015, 2016, 2017, 2019

==== Women's Championships and Titles ====
- Conference Championships: 2007, 2008, 2009, 2010, 2011, 2012, 2014
- NCAA National Qualifiers: 2006, 2007, 2008, 2009, 2010, 2011, 2012, 2013, 2014, 2015, 2016, 2017, 2018, 2019

==== Football ====
St. Edward's fielded an intercollegiate football team, last known as the Crusaders. The program was discontinued following the 1939 season.

==== Tennis ====
The Hilltoppers men's and women's tennis teams debuted their first seasons in 1963 and 1988, respectively, and were both disbanded in April 2020 due to factors relating to the COVID-19 pandemic. The men's team played its final season under head coach Chris Hill and the women's team played its final season under head coach Kendall Brooks.

===== Men's Titles and Championships =====
- Conference Championships: 1963, 1964, 1965, 1967, 1969, 1970, 1971, 1972, 1973, 1974, 1975, 1976, 1977, 1978, 1979, 1980, 1981, 1982, 1984, 1985, 1986, 1990, 1991, 1992, 1998, 1999, 2006, 2007, 2009, 2010, 2011, 2012, 2013, 2014, 2015, 2016, 2018, 2019,
- NAIA National Qualifiers: 1983
- NCAA National Qualifiers: 2000, 2001, 2003, 2004, 2005, 2006, 2007, 2009, 2010, 2011, 2012, 2013, 2014, 2015, 2016, 2018, 2019

===== Women's Titles and Championships =====
- Conference Championships: 1989, 2003, 2005, 2007, 2009, 2012
- NAIA National Qualifiers: 1989
- NCAA National Qualifiers: 2001, 2002, 2003, 2004, 2005, 2006, 2207, 2009, 2012, 2015, 2016, 2018, 2019

=== Non-NCAA Teams ===
==== Cheer ====
The Hilltoppers cheer team is a Co-Ed non-NCAA cheer team led by head cheer and STUNT coach Sidney Mcintosh.

==== Esports ====
The Hilltoppers Esports team is a Co-Ed non-NCAA Esports team led by head coach Tony Zhong. As of 2026, most matches are played remotely from Austin, TX with heavy focus on Super Smash Bros, Call of Duty, Valorant, and Rocket League.

== Club sports and campus recreation ==
In 2009, the university added a Campus Recreation program to meet the growing needs of the student population. All club sports are housed within the Campus Recreation office. The university supports several club-level programs including:

=== Competitive club sports teams ===
- Cycling
- Men's Basketball
- Men's Lacrosse
- Men's Soccer
- Rugby
- Rowing
- Women's Soccer
- Swimming
- Women's Volleyball

=== Conditional club sports teams ===
- Archery
- Bass Fishing Club
- Cultural Dance Club
- Dance Team
- Karate
- Men's Volleyball
- Outdoor Adventure Club
- Ving Tsun Martial Arts Club
- Women's Basketball
- Women's Lacrosse

=== Intramural sports ===
- 5-on-5 Basketball
- 7-on-7 Soccer
- Dodgeball
- Flag football
- Indoor Soccer
- Indoor Volleyball
- Innertube Water Polo
- Racquetball
- Ultimate Frisbee
- Volleyball

=== Rugby club ===
Founded in 2009, the St Edward’s University Rugby Football Club plays in NSCRO or National Small College Rugby Organization in the Lonestar Conference. St. Edward's joined the Lonestar Conference in May 2013. St. Edward's ascended from Division III to Division I being promoted to the next division in three straight seasons from 2011-2013. In 2010-2011, their first season, St. Edwards had an undefeated regular season, won the Texas DIII league, and finished fifth nationally among small schools. In 2011-2012, St. Edwards again had an undefeated regular season in DII winning their conference. 2012-2013 saw St. Edward's join the DI South West Conference where they finished as the runner up in both 15's and 7's rugby. St. Edward's then rejoined the NSCRO Lone Star conference and finished with consecutive undefeated conference records and conference championships in 2013-2014 and 2014-2015. In 2014 St. Edward's won the inaugural Texas Cup competition which is an open tournament across all divisions and brackets in Texas college rugby, they also became the first team in the history of NSCRO to defeat a Varsity Cup team when they defeated the University of Texas. In 2015 St. Edwards was named men's college rugby program of the year. St. Edward's has seen an increase in applications and matriculating students who target the school because of its rugby program, and as a result, the administration has put more support behind the rugby program.
