= East Texas A&M Lions softball =

- 2024 Texas A&M–Commerce Lions softball team
- Founded: 2015
- University: East Texas A&M University
- Head coach: Rodney DeLong (1st season)
- Conference: Southland
- Location: Commerce, Texas, US
- Home stadium: John Cain Family Softball Complex (capacity: 800)
- Nickname: Lions
- Colors: Blue and gold

NCAA Tournament appearances
- 2016*, 2018*, 2019*, 2021*, 2022*

Conference tournament championships
- 2022**at Division II level

For information on all East Texas A&M sports, see East Texas A&M Lions

The East Texas A&M Lions softball (formerly the Texas A&M–Commerce Lions) team is the intercollegiate softball program representing East Texas A&M University. The school competes in the Southland Conference in Division I of the National Collegiate Athletic Association (NCAA). For their first eight years of existence, they competed in the Lone Star Conference (LSC) in Division II. The East Texas A&M softball team plays its home games at John Cain Family Softball Complex on the university campus in Commerce, Texas. The team is currently coached by Rodney DeLong.

== History ==
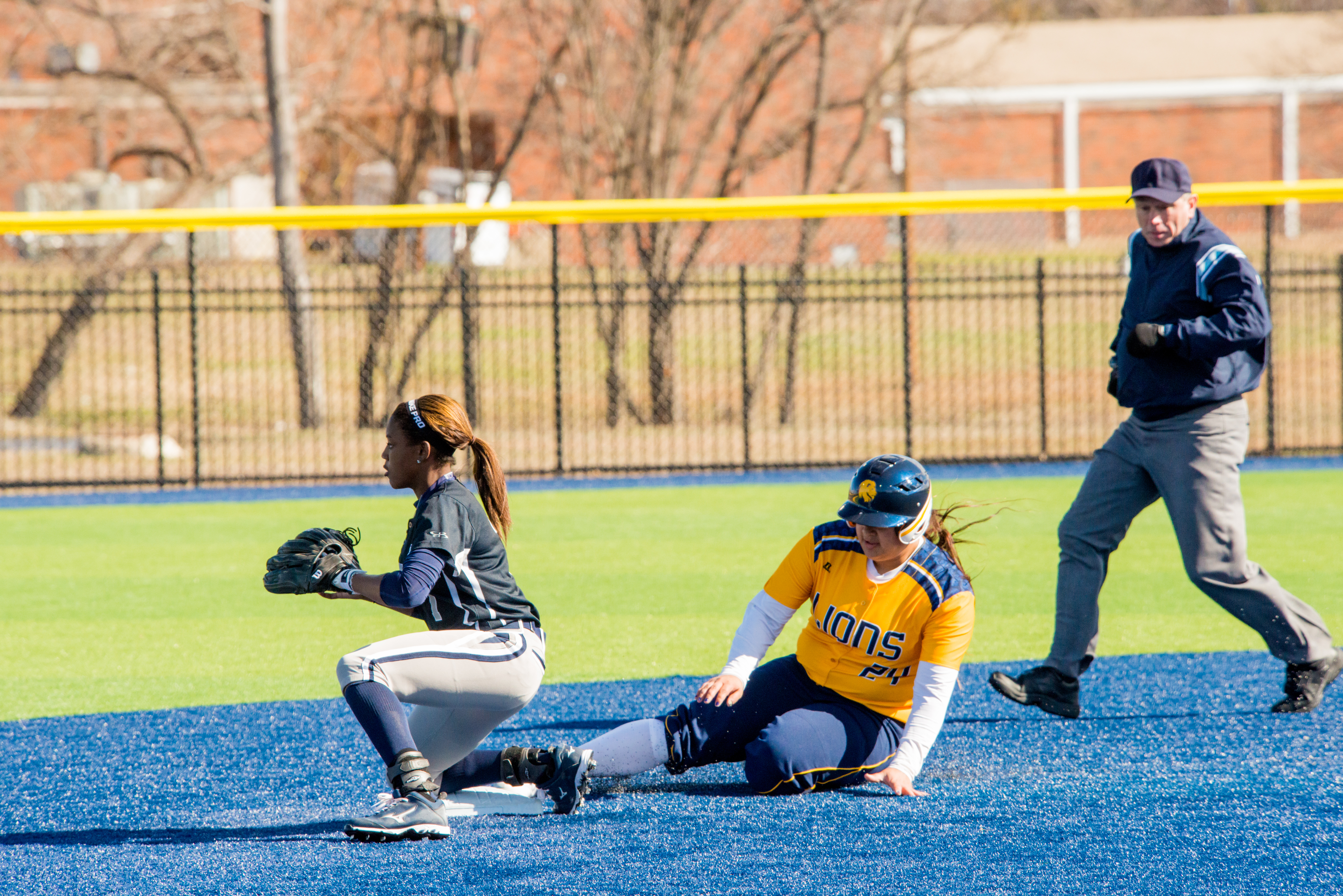
The 2015 A&M–Commerce Lions softball team in action against St. Edward's University

Softball has been a varsity sport at East Texas A&M since the 2015 season. The program was first announced in May 2013, making it both the seventh women's sport to be offered by the university and making East Texas A&M (then known as A&M–Commerce) the last school in the LSC to sponsor softball. According to then-athletic director Ryan Ivey, the university's decision to add softball was due to its rising popularity and the growing talent pool of players in Northeast Texas, as well as to help A&M–Commerce meet Title IX requirements.

From 2015 to 2021, the team was coached by Richie Bruister, previously the head softball coach at Henderson State University and Texas Woman's University. Bruister compiled a record of 183–97 (.654), four LSC Championship appearances, and three NCAA tournament appearances in five years with TWU; he also won both the LSC and National Fastpitch Coaches Association Coach of the Year awards in 2013.

In its inaugural 2015 season, the Lions achieved an overall record of 29–24 (.547), finishing sixth in the regular-season LSC standings and reaching the quarterfinals of the conference tournament before being eliminated. Other achievements during the program's first season included Tyler Oppenheim's recognition as an LSC Player of the Week and the team's average GPA of 3.536, the highest in the conference. Also in 2015, the A&M–Commerce softball team hosted the inaugural Lion Classic, a four-team tournament that included Northeastern State University, Southern Nazarene University, and Tarleton State University.

After seven seasons, Bruister left A&M-Commerce, having compiled an overall record of 231-114. His associate head coach, Gay McNutt, was subsequently promoted to interim head coach. In their final season in the Lone Star Conference before moving up to Division I, McNutt guided the Lions to their first and only Lone Star Conference Tournament victory before eventually falling in the Regional Tournament against the Texas A&M-Kingsville Javelinas.

Following the season, McNutt resigned to take over the head coaching position at Texas Woman's University on June 9, 2022. On June 24, 2022, Brittany Miller was hired as the third head coach in program history.

On August 3, 2022, Miller added three-time Olympic gold medalist Crystl Bustos to the coaching staff as an assistant coach.

In the Lions' first Division I season, they endured their first overall losing season in program history, finishing 9-39 overall and 5-19 in conference play. This would be their first time having a losing season in conference play since their inaugural season in 2015.

During Miller's second season, the Lions once again finished at the bottom of the Southland Conference standings, going 2-22 in conference play and 9-45 overall, marking the first time in program history to have consecutive losing seasons.

Miller's third season saw the Lions go 10-42 overall and 6-21 in conference play, marking their third consecutive losing season. Despite that, the Lions made the Southland Conference Tournament for the first time in school history, but were eliminated in bracket play.

In 2026, the Lions endured their worst season in school history, finishing just 6-46 overall and 1-26 in conference play. After the season, East Texas A&M and Miller parted ways after four seasons.

On May 20, 2026, East Texas A&M hired Rodney DeLong as the fourth head coach in program history.

=== All-time record ===
Year	Head coach	Overall	Pct.	Conf.	Pct.	Place	Tourn.	Postseason
2015	Richie Bruister	29–24	.547	12–14	.462	6th	First Round	–
2016	Richie Bruister	37–19	.661	18–14	.563	3rd	First Round	Regional Tournament
2017	Richie Bruister	34–20	.630	16–14	.533	6th	First Round	–
2018	Richie Bruister	42–12	.778	23–7	.767	4th	Semifinals	Regional Champions
2019	Richie Bruister	40–14	.741	23–7	.767	2nd	Semifinals	Regional Runner-Up
2020	Richie Bruister	16–7	.696	5–3	.625	T4th	–	–
2021	Richie Bruister	33–18	.647	21–9	.700	4th	First Round	Regional Runner-Up
2022	Gay McNutt	43–15	.741	22–8	.733	T4th	Champions	Regional Tournament
2023	Brittany Miller	9–39	.188	5–19	.357	9th	—	—
2024	Brittany Miller	9–45	.167	2–22	.083	9th	—	—
2025	Brittany Miller	10–42	.192	6–21	.222	T-8th	Bracket Play	—
2026	Brittany Miller	6-46	.115	1–26	.037	10th	—	—

Year-by-year results through the end of the 2026 season

== Stadium ==
John Cain Family Softball Complex
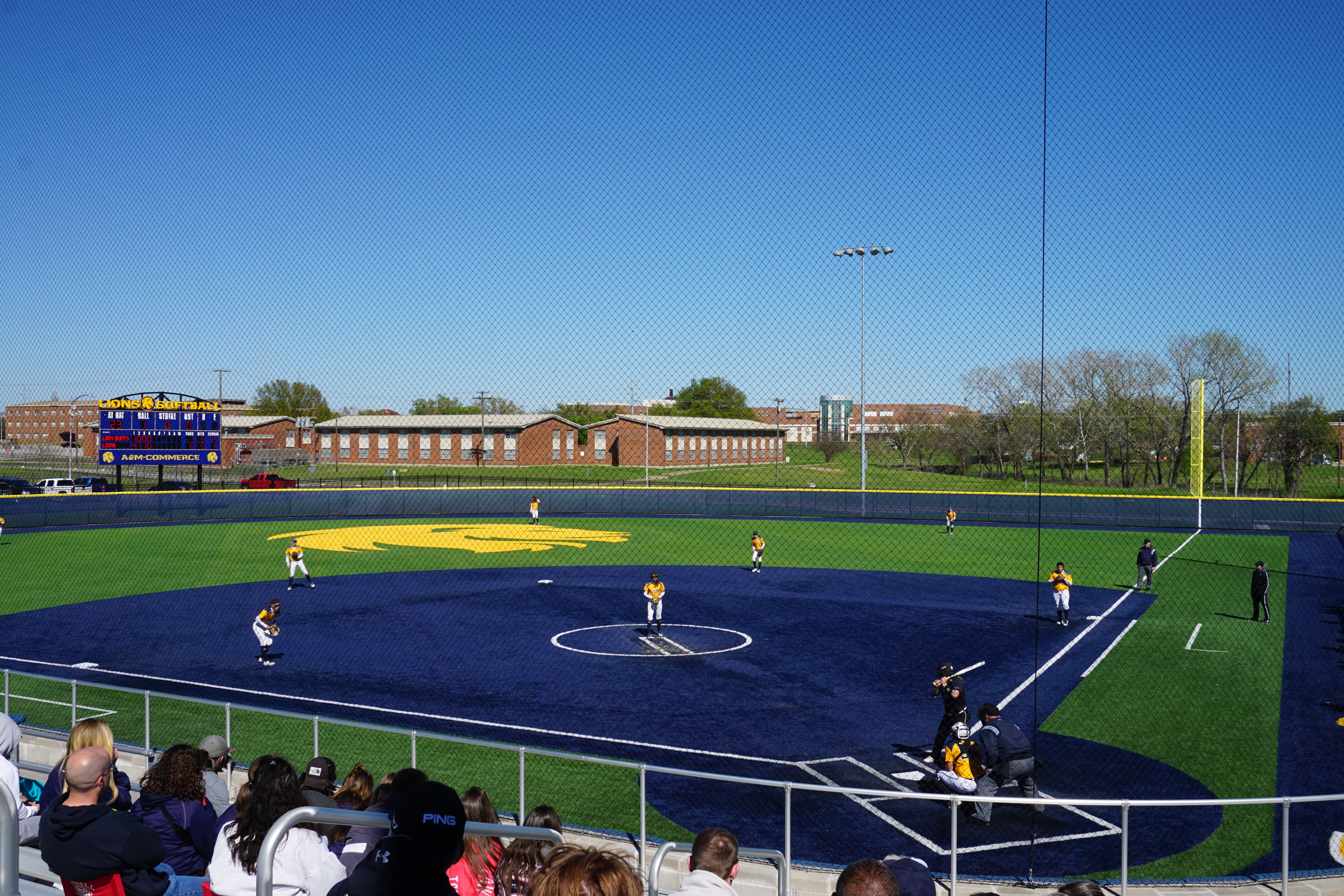
- Interactive map of John Cain Family Softball Complex
- Location: On Hubbell Dr; Commerce, Texas
- Coordinates: 33°14′22.3″N 95°54′57.3″W
- Owner: Texas A&M University–Commerce
- Operator: Texas A&M University–Commerce
- Capacity: 800 (not including berm seating)
- Surface: Turf
- Scoreboard: Electronic
- Field size: Left Field: 190 ft Center Field: 220 ft Right Field: 190 ft

Construction
- Built: 2014–15
- Opened: February 1, 2015

Tenants
- Texas A&M–Commerce Lions softball (NCAA) (2015–Present)

The Lions softball team has played at John Cain Family Softball Complex since its first game, on February 1, 2015, against St. Edward's University. The stadium seats 800 spectators in both general admission and reserved seating, not including its extra capacity for standing-room-only spectators and those watching the game from the center-field picnic berm. The outfield fence is 190 feet (58 m) from home plate along each foul line and 220 feet (67 m) from the plate at center field. The playing surface is artificial turf, featuring an atypically blue-colored infield and a large A&M–Commerce lion logo in center field. John Cain Family Softball Field also features home and visitor in-ground dugouts, bullpens for both teams, and three batting cages. As of October 2015, the softball program is raising funds to add an indoor batting facility on the grounds of the stadium.

2019 and 2021 NCAA Division II South Central Regional tournament games were held at the stadium.
