= Lucian-Hamilton Field =

Baseball venue in Austin, Texas

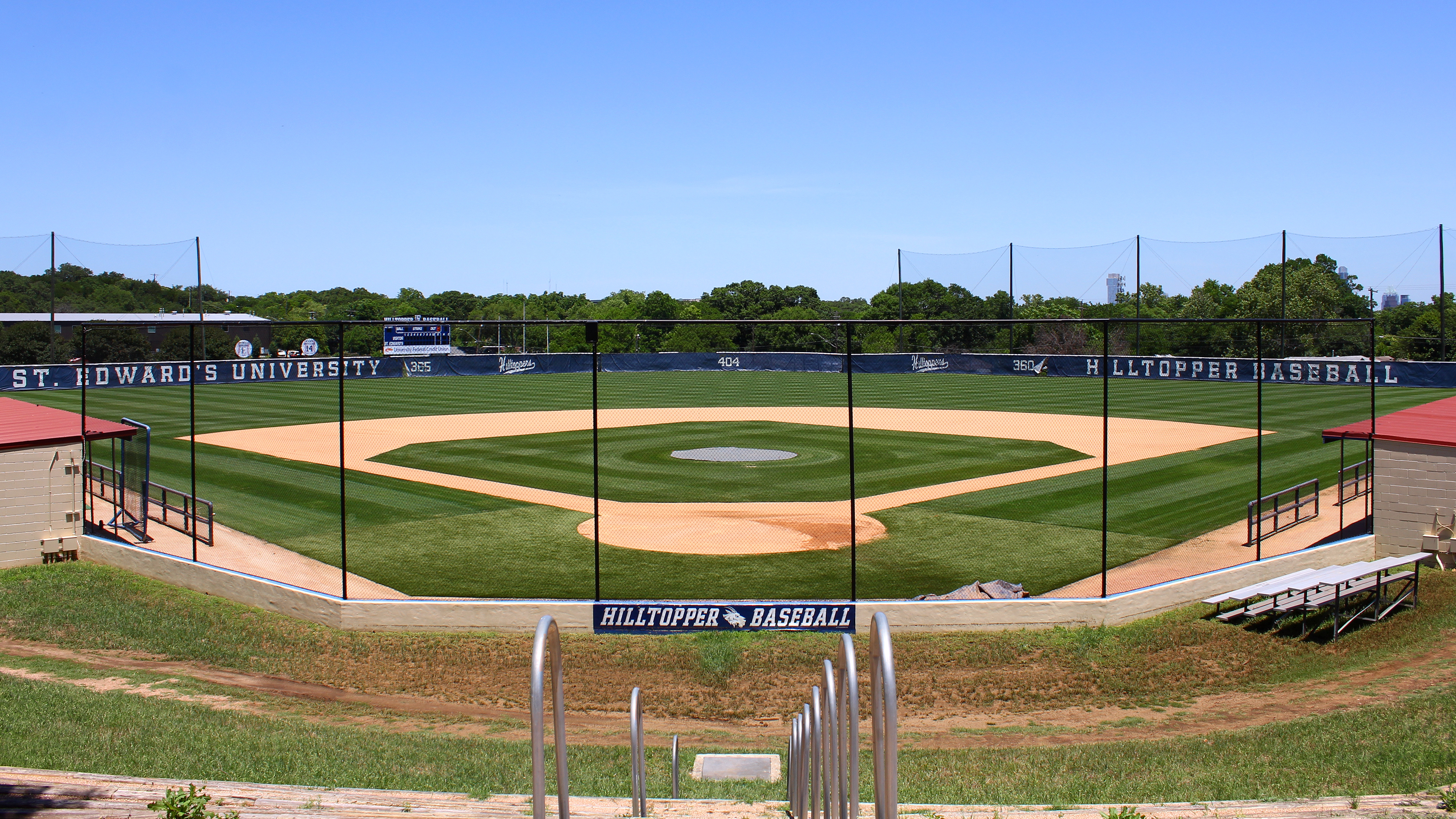
- Interactive map of Lucian-Hamilton Field
- Full name: Lucian-Hamilton Field
- Location: Austin, Texas
- Coordinates: 30.2313°N 97.75257°W
- Owner: St. Edward's University
- Operator: St. Edward's University
- Capacity: 500
- Field size: 335 LF; 404 CF; 330 RF

Construction
- Opened: 1968

Tenant
- St. Edward's University Hilltoppers

Lucian-Hamilton Field is a baseball park in Austin in the U.S. state of Texas and the home of the St. Edward's Hilltoppers baseball team. Located on the St. Edward's University campus, Lucian-Hamilton Field was built in 1968. It is named for former athletic director Lucian Blersch and former baseball coach Tom Hamilton.
