= Geo-Surfaces Field at the ULM Softball Complex =

Stadium in Monroe, Louisiana

ULM Softball Complex
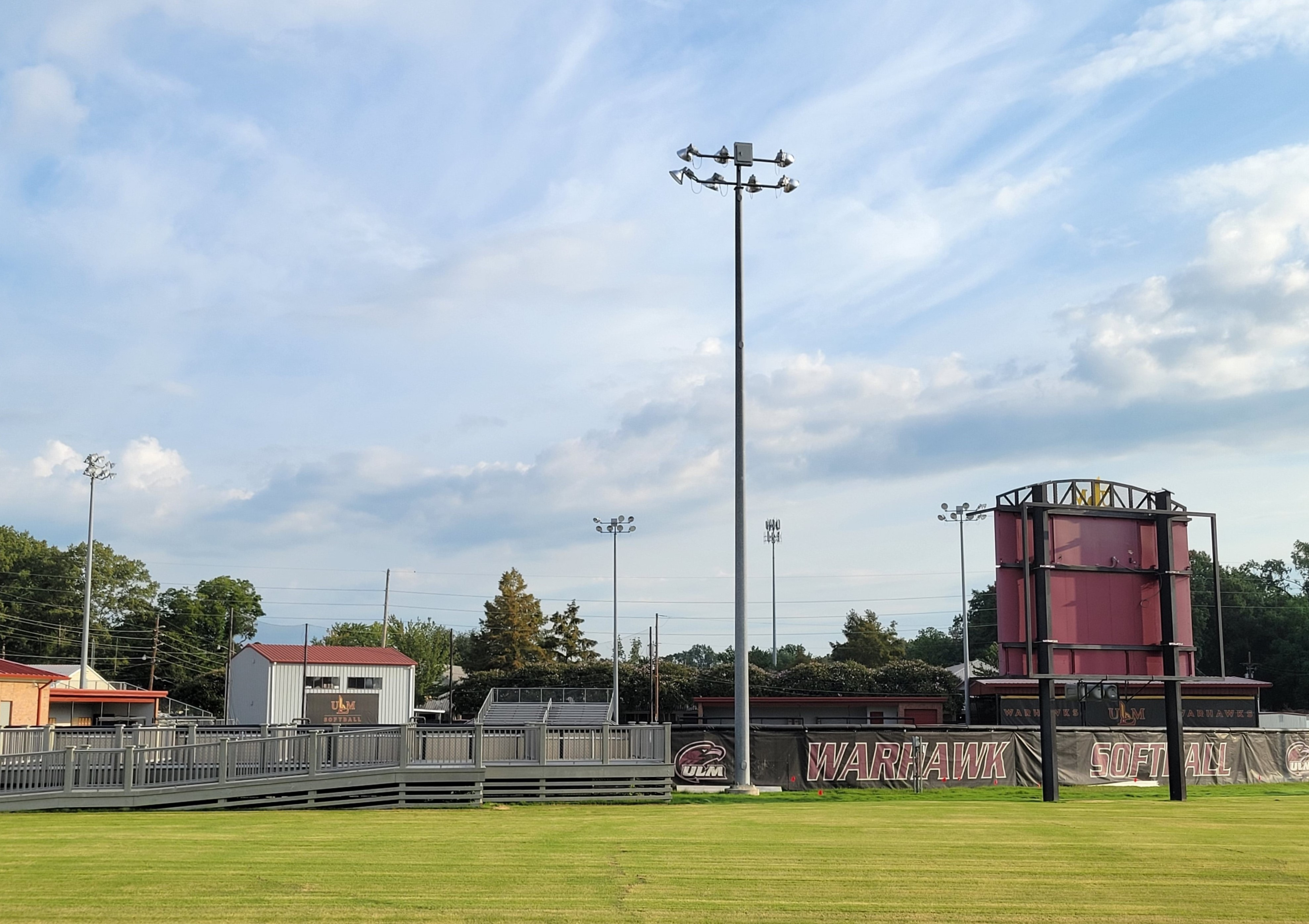
- Interactive map of ULM Softball Complex
- Location: Monroe, Louisiana
- Coordinates: 32°32′04″N 92°03′59″W
- Owner: University of Louisiana at Monroe
- Operator: University of Louisiana at Monroe
- Capacity: 500
- Surface: Grass
- Scoreboard: Electronic
- Field size: Left Field: 204 ft. Center Field: 210 ft. Right Field: 200 ft. (estimated)

Construction
- Opened: 1980
- Renovated: 2010, 2011
- Cost: $2.4 Million USD

Tenant
- Louisiana–Monroe Warhawks softball (NCAA) (1980–present)

The ULM Softball Complex is the home stadium for the Louisiana–Monroe Warhawks softball team. Located on the campus of the University of Louisiana at Monroe, the area the complex is built on was the former home of the Louisiana–Monroe Warhawks baseball team until the early 1980s. The complex utilizes bleacher seating, and has a capacity for over 500 people, as well as room for additional seating space along both foul lines.

The stadium was the site of the Southland Conference softball tournament in 1985 and 1997.

== Gallery ==
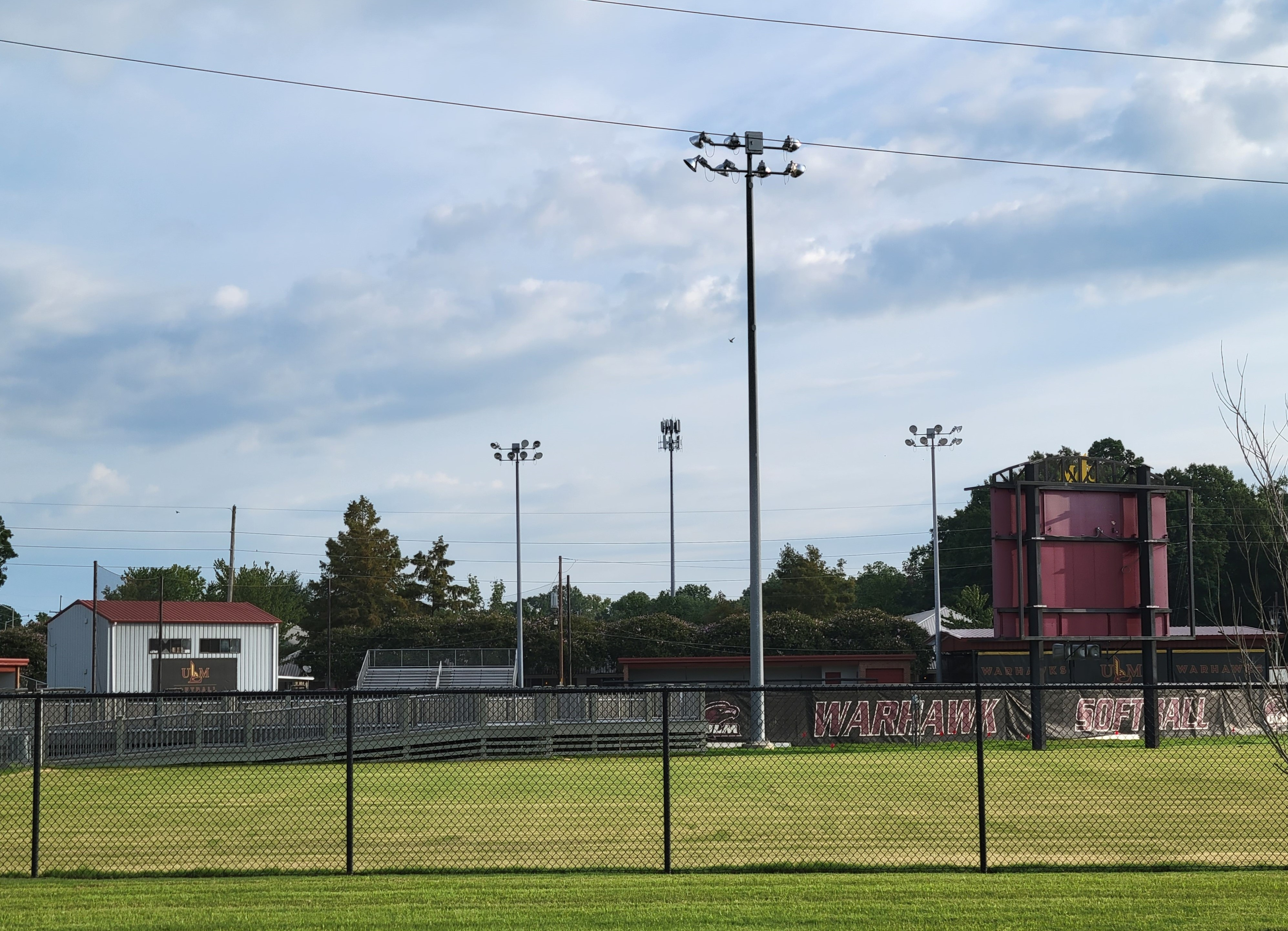
ULM Softball Complex

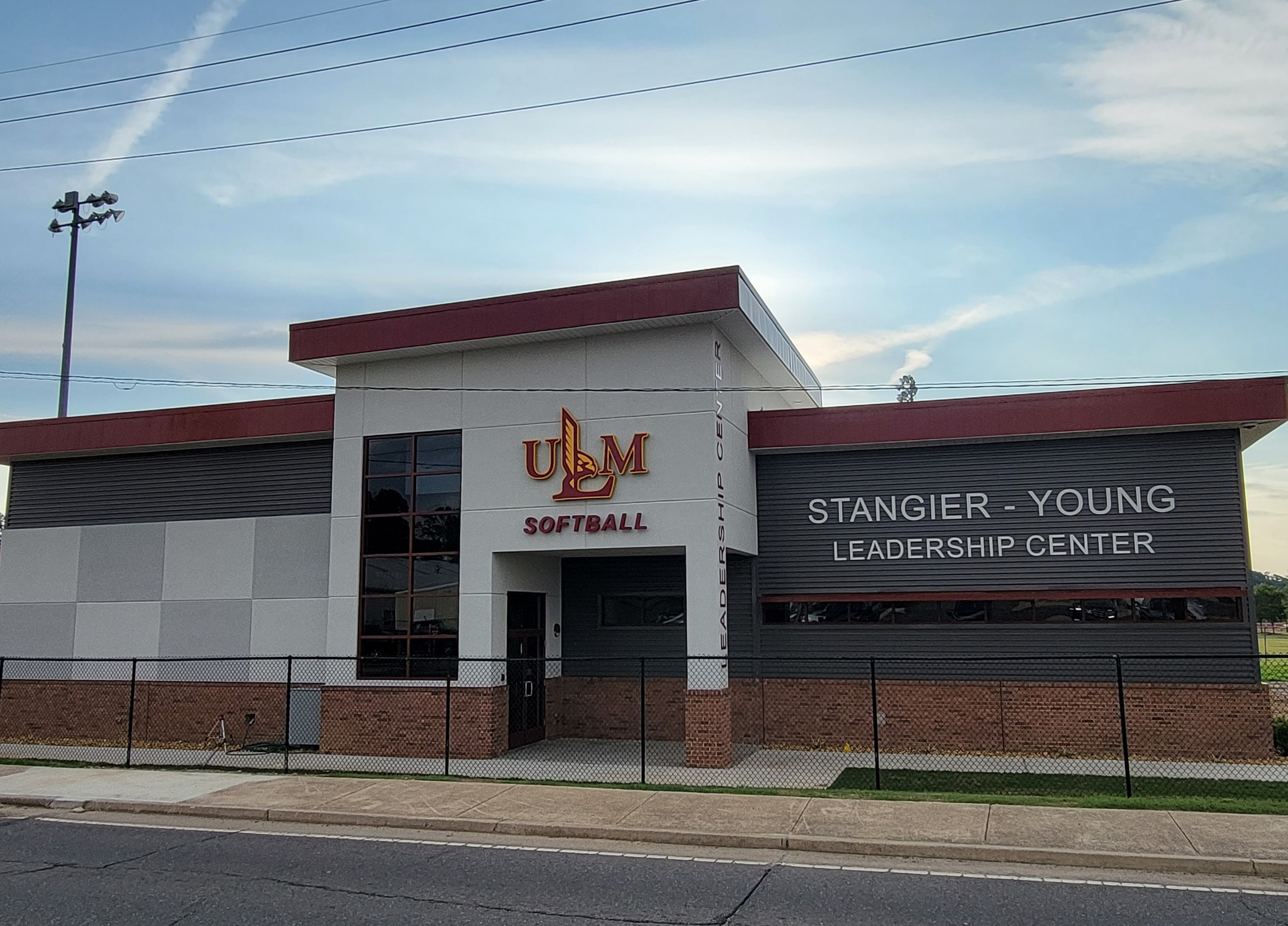
ULM Softball Complex, Stangier–Young Leadership Center
