= 2020 NCAA Division I softball rankings =

2020 NCAA Division I softball season
- Duration: February 6 – June 3, 2020
- Number of teams: 286
- Preseason No. 1: Alabama (USA Softball/ESPN, D1S); Washington (NFCA, SA); UCLA (FloSoftball)
- Defending Champions: UCLA
- TV partner/s: ESPN

NCAA Tournament
- Duration: May 15 – June 3, 2020

Women's College World Series
- Duration: May 28 – June 3, 2020

Seasons
- ← 2019 2021 →

The following human polls made up the 2020 NCAA Division I women's softball rankings. The NFCA/USA Today Poll was voted on by a panel of 32 Division I softball coaches. The ESPN.com/USA Softball Collegiate Poll was voted on by a panel of 20 voters. The NFCA/USA Today poll, the Softball America poll, the ESPN.com/USA Softball Collegiate rankings, and D1Softball ranked the top 25 teams nationally.

== Legend ==
	Increase in ranking
	Decrease in ranking
	Not ranked previous week
Italics	Number of first place votes
(#–#)	Win–loss record
т	Tied with team above or below also with this symbol

== NFCA/USA Today ==
The final NFCA/USA Today poll was announced on April 7, 2020 after the 2020 NCAA Division I softball season was cancelled due to COVID-19.

	Preseason Jan 28	Week 1 Feb 11	Week 2 Feb 18	Week 3 Feb 25	Week 4 Mar 3	Week 5 Mar 10	Week 6 April 7	Week 7	Week 8	Week 9	Week 10	Week 11	Week 12	Week 13	Week 14	Week 15	Final	
1.	Washington (7)	Washington (25) (5–0)	UCLA (30) (11–0)	UCLA (31) (15–0)	UCLA (26) (19–1)	UCLA (31) (25–1)	UCLA (32) (25–1)											1.
2.	Alabama (11)	Oklahoma (2) (4–0)	Washington (1) (10–1)	Washington (1) (15–1)	Washington (4) (19–2)	Washington (1) (23–2)	Washington (23–2)											2.
3.	Oklahoma (4)	UCLA (4) (6–0)	Oklahoma (8–1)	Texas (15–1)	Texas (2) (20–3)	Texas (24–3)	Texas (24–3)											3.
4.	UCLA (9)	Arizona (5–0)	Texas (10–0)	LSU (13–1)	Arizona (17–3)	Arizona (21–3)	Arizona (22–3)											4.
5.	Arizona (1)	Florida State (1) (5–0)	Arizona (9–1)	Oklahoma (11–3)	LSU (16–3)	LSU (20–3)	LSU (21–3)											5.
6.	Texas	Texas (6-0)	LSU (8–1)	Florida (16–2)	Oklahoma (15–4)	Oklahoma (20–4)	Oklahoma (20–4)											6.
7.	Florida	LSU (5–0)	Florida (11–1)	Arizona (12–3)	Florida (17–4)	Florida (21–4)	Florida (23–4)											7.
8.	Minnesota	Florida (4–1)	Michigan (1) (9–0)	Alabama (9–5)	Louisiana (14–5)	Louisiana (16–6)	Louisiana (18–6)											8.
9.	Florida State	Alabama (1–3)	Florida State (7–4)	Florida State (7–4)	Alabama (12–7)	Oregon (21–2)	Oregon (22–2)											9.
10.	Louisiana	Kentucky (4–0)	Alabama (4–5)	Louisiana (11–3) т	Kentucky (17–3)	Alabama (14–8)	Alabama (14–8)											10.
11.	LSU	Michigan (5–0)	Louisiana (7–2)	Oregon (14–0) т	Oregon (17–2)	Kentucky (18–4)	Kentucky (20–4)											11.
12.	Tennessee	Tennessee (2–1)	Tennessee (6–2)	Kentucky (12–3)	Florida State (10–6)	Florida State (17–6)	Florida State (17–7)											12.
13.	Oklahoma State	Louisiana (3–1)	Kentucky (7–2)	Michigan (10–3)	Georgia (20–4)	Oklahoma State (18–5)	Oklahoma State (19–5)											13.
14.	Northwestern	Minnesota (3–2)	Oklahoma State (6–3)	Georgia (14–3)	Oklahoma State (13–5)	Georgia (22–5)	Georgia (23–5)											14.
15.	Kentucky	Georgia (5–0)	Oregon (9–0)	Oklahoma State (8–5)	South Carolina (14–4)	Arizona State (20–7)	South Carolina (17–6)											15.
16.	Georgia	Oklahoma State (2–2)	Arizona State (10–2)	South Carolina (10–3)	Michigan (12–6)	South Carolina (15–6)	Virginia Tech (21–4)											16.
17.	Michigan	Texas Tech (5–0)	Minnesota (5–4)	Arizona State (12–5)	Arizona State (16–6)	Virginia Tech (19–4)	Arizona State (22–7)											17.
18.	Texas Tech	South Carolina (4–0)	Missouri (9–2)	Minnesota (8–6)	Minnesota (12–7)	Michigan (15–8)	Michigan (15–8)											18.
19.	South Carolina	Missouri (5–0)	Georgia (8–3)	Virginia Tech (12–3)	Virginia Tech (16–4)	Minnesota (14–9–1)	Arkansas (19–6)											19.
20.	James Madison	James Madison (0–0)	Texas Tech (7–3)	Tennessee (7–6)	Arkansas (16–4)	Arkansas (17–6)	Mississippi State (25–3)											20.
21.	Ole Miss	Northwestern (2–3) т	James Madison (2–1)	Missouri (12–5)	Baylor (17–4)	Mississippi State (23–3)	UCF (21–5–1)											21.
22.	Arizona State	Oregon (5–0) т	South Carolina (5–3)	Arkansas (12–2)	UCF (16–2)	UCF (19–5–1)	Minnesota (15–9–1)											22.
23.	Auburn	Arizona State (4–1)	Arkansas (7–1)	Baylor (13–2)	Missouri (15–6)	Missouri (19–6)	Baylor (19–5)											23.
24.	Arkansas	Arkansas (4–1)	Virginia Tech (7–3)	James Madison (6–3)	Mississippi State (18–3)	Baylor (17–5)	Fresno State (27-4)											24.
25.	Wisconsin	North Carolina (3–2)	Northwestern (4–5)	Texas Tech (10–5)	Fresno State (16–4)	Fresno State (27–4)	Missouri (19–7)											25.
	Preseason Jan 28	Week 1 Feb 11	Week 2 Feb 18	Week 3 Feb 25	Week 4 Mar 3	Week 5 Mar 10	Week 6 April 7	Week 7	Week 8	Week 9	Week 10	Week 11	Week 12	Week 13	Week 14	Week 15	Final	
		Dropped: No. 21 Ole Miss; No. 23 Auburn; No. 25 Wisconsin	Dropped: No. 25 North Carolina	Dropped: No. 25 Northwestern	Dropped: No. 20 Tennessee; No. 24 James Madison; No. 25 Texas Tech	None	None	None	None	None	None	None	None	None	None	None	None	

== ESPN.com/USA Softball Collegiate Top 25 ==
The final ESPN.com/USA Softball Collegiate Top 25 poll was announced on April 7, 2020 after the 2020 NCAA Division I softball season was cancelled due to COVID-19.

	Preseason Jan 28	Week 1 Feb 11	Week 2 Feb 18	Week 3 Feb 25	Week 4 Mar 3	Week 5 Mar 10	Week 6 April 7	Week 7	Week 8	Week 9	Week 10	Week 11	Week 12	Week 13	Week 14	Week 15	Final	
1.	Alabama (12)	Washington (10) (5–0)	UCLA (19) (11–0)	UCLA (20) (15–0)	UCLA (15) (19–1)	UCLA (16) (25–1)	UCLA (20) (25–1)											1.
2.	Washington (2)	UCLA (7) (6–0)	Washington (10–1)	Washington (15–1)	Texas (5) (20–3)	Texas (4) (24–3)	Washington (23–2)											2.
3.	Oklahoma (3)	Oklahoma (2) (4–0)	Oklahoma (8–1)	Texas (15–1)	Washington (19–2)	Washington (23–2)	Texas (24–3)											3.
4.	UCLA (3)	Arizona (5–0)	Texas (10–0)	LSU (13–1)	LSU (16–3)	Arizona (21–3)	Arizona (22–3)											4.
5.	Arizona	Florida State (1) (5–0)	Arizona (9–1)	Oklahoma (11–3)	Arizona (17–3)	LSU (20–3)	LSU (21–3)											5.
6.	Texas	Texas (6–0)	Michigan (1) (9–0)	Florida (16–2)	Oklahoma (15–4)	Oklahoma (20–4)	Florida (23–4)											6.
7.	Minnesota	LSU (5–0)	LSU (8–1)	Arizona (12–3)	Louisiana (14–5)	Florida (21–4)	Oklahoma (20–4)											7.
8.	Florida State	Michigan (5–0)	Florida State (7–4)	Florida State (7–4)	Florida (17–4)	Louisiana (16–6)	Oregon (22–2)											8.
9.	Florida	Alabama (1–3)	Florida (11–1)	Louisiana (11–3)	Oregon (17–2)	Oregon (21–2)	Louisiana (18–6)											9.
10.	Louisiana	Kentucky (4–0)	Louisiana (7–2)	Oregon (14–0)	Kentucky (17–3)	Florida State (17–6)	Kentucky (20–4)											10.
11.	LSU т	Florida (4–1)	Kentucky (7–2)	Michigan (10–3)	Florida State (10–6)	Kentucky (18–4)	Oklahoma State (19–5)											11.
12.	Tennessee т	Tennessee (2–1)	Tennessee (7–2)	Alabama (9–5)	Oklahoma State (13–5)	Oklahoma State (18–5)	Florida State (17–7)											12.
13.	Oklahoma State	Minnesota (3–2)	Alabama (4–5)	Kentucky (12–3)	Alabama (12–7)	Alabama (14–8)	Alabama (14–8)											13.
14.	Michigan	Louisiana (3–1)	Oklahoma State (6–3)	Oklahoma State (8–5)	Georgia (20–4)	Georgia (22–5)	Georgia (23–5)											14.
15.	Northwestern	Georgia (5–0)	Minnesota (5–4)	Georgia (14–3)	Arizona State (16–6)	Arizona State (20–7)	Arizona State (22–7)											15.
16.	Kentucky	Oklahoma State (2–2)	Arizona State (9–2)	Arizona State (12–5)	Michigan (12–6)	South Carolina (15–6)	South Carolina (17–6)											16.
17.	Georgia	South Carolina (4–0)	Oregon (9–0)	South Carolina (10–3)	South Carolina (14–4)	Michigan (15–8)	Baylor (19–5)											17.
18.	James Madison	Missouri (5–0)	Georgia (8–3)	Minnesota (8–6)	Baylor (17–4)	Baylor (17–5)	Virginia Tech (25–1)											18.
19.	Texas Tech	Texas Tech (5–0)	Missouri (9–2)	Baylor (13–2)	Minnesota (12–7)	Minnesota (14–9–1)	Michigan (15–8)											19.
20.	Arkansas	James Madison (0–0)	Texas Tech (7–3)	Virginia Tech (12–3)	Arkansas (16–4)	Arkansas (17–6)	Mississippi State (25–3)											20.
21.	South Carolina	Oregon (5–0)	James Madison (2–1)	Arkansas (12–2)	Virginia Tech (16–4)	Virginia Tech (19–4)	Arkansas (18–6)											21.
22.	Arizona State	Arizona State (4–1)	South Carolina (5–3)	Tennessee (7–6)	Mississippi State (18–3) т	Mississippi State (24–3)	Minnesota (15–9–1)											22.
23.	Wisconsin	Northwestern (2–3)	Arkansas (7–1)	Missouri (12–5)	UCF (16–2) т	UCF (19–5–1)	Fresno State (21–4)											23.
24.	Oregon	Arkansas (4–1)	Mississippi State (9–1)	Texas Tech (10–5)	Missouri (15–6)	Missouri (19–6)	UCF (21–5–1)											24.
25.	Ole Miss	North Carolina (3–2)	Virginia Tech (7–3)	James Madison (6–3)	Utah (12–2)	Fresno State (21–4)	Duke (23–4)											25.
	Preseason Jan 28	Week 1 Feb 11	Week 2 Feb 18	Week 3 Feb 25	Week 4 Mar 3	Week 5 Mar 10	Week 6 April 7	Week 7	Week 8	Week 9	Week 10	Week 11	Week 12	Week 13	Week 14	Week 15	Final	
		Dropped: No. 23 Wisconsin; No. 25 Ole Miss	Dropped: No. 23 Northwestern; No. 25 North Carolina	Dropped: No. 24 Mississippi State	Dropped: No. 22 Tennessee; No. 24 Texas Tech; No. 25 James Madison	Dropped: No. 25 Utah	Dropped: No. 24 Missouri	None	None	None	None	None	None	None	None	None	None	

== D1Softball ==
	Preseason Jan 21	Week 1 Feb 10	Week 2 Feb 17	Week 3 Feb 24	Week 4 Mar 2	Week 5 Mar 9	Week 6	Week 7	Week 8	Week 9	Week 10	Week 11	Week 12	Week 13	Week 14	Week 15	Final	
1.	Alabama	UCLA (6–0)	UCLA (11–0)	UCLA (15–0)	UCLA (19–1)	UCLA (25–1)												1.
2.	Washington	Washington (5–0)	Oklahoma (8–1)	Washington (15–1)	Texas (20–3)	Texas (24–3)												2.
3.	Arizona	Arizona (5–0)	Texas (10–0)	Texas (15–1)	Washington (19–2)	Washington (23–2)												3.
4.	UCLA	Oklahoma (4–0)	Arizona (9–1)	LSU (13–1)	Arizona (17–3)	Arizona (21–3)												4.
5.	Oklahoma	Florida State (5–0)	Washington (10–1)	Arizona (12–3)	LSU (16–3)	LSU (20–3)												5.
6.	Texas	Texas (6–0)	LSU (8–1)	Oklahoma (11–3)	Louisiana (14–5)	Oklahoma (20–4)												6.
7.	Minnesota	LSU (5–0)	Florida State (7–4)	Louisiana (11–3)	Oklahoma (15–4)	Louisiana (16–6)												7.
8.	Louisiana	Alabama (1–3)	Oklahoma State (6–3)	Florida State (7–4)	Florida (17–4)	Florida (21–4)												8.
9.	Florida	Oklahoma State (2–2)	Alabama (4–5)	Florida (16–2)	Florida State (10–6)	Oklahoma State (18–5)												9.
10.	Florida State	Kentucky (4–0)	Louisiana (7–2)	Alabama (9–5)	Alabama (12–7)	Florida State (17–6)												10.
11.	LSU	Minnesota (3–2)	Michigan (9–0)	Oklahoma State (8–5)	Oklahoma State (13–5)	Alabama (14–8)												11.
12.	Oklahoma State	Louisiana (3–1)	Oregon (9–0)	Oregon (14–0)	Oregon (17–2)	Oregon (21–2)												12.
13.	Northwestern	Michigan (5–0)	Kentucky (7–2)	Michigan (10–3)	Kentucky (17–3)	Kentucky (18–4)												13.
14.	Tennessee	Oregon (5–0)	Florida (11–1)	Kentucky (12–3)	Georgia (20–4)	Georgia (22–5)												14.
15.	Georgia	Florida (4–1)	Missouri (9–2)	Georgia (14–3)	Arizona State (16–6)	Missouri (19–6)												15.
16.	Texas Tech	Missouri (5–0)	Minnesota (5–4)	Missouri (12–5)	Missouri (15–6)	Arizona State (21–7)												16.
17.	Kentucky	Texas Tech (5–0)	Arizona State (9–2)	Arizona State (12–5)	South Carolina (14–4)	South Carolina (15–6)												17.
18.	Michigan	Georgia (5–0)	Tennessee (6–2)	South Carolina (10–3)	Michigan (12–6)	Michigan (15–8)												18.
19.	Oregon	Tennessee (2–1)	Texas Tech (7–3)	Minnesota (8–6)	Minnesota (12–7)	Virginia Tech (19–4)												19.
20.	South Carolina	South Carolina (4–0)	Georgia (8–3)	Utah (10–2)	Utah (12–2)	Minnesota (14–9–1)												20.
21.	Arkansas	Arizona State (4–1)	South Carolina (5–3)	Virginia Tech (12–3)	Virginia Tech (16–4)	Utah (14–4)												21.
22.	Auburn	North Carolina (3–2)	North Carolina (5–5)	Texas Tech (10–5)	Arkansas (16–4)	Fresno State (21–4)												22.
23.	Arizona State	Arkansas (4–1)	Utah (7–2)	Arkansas (12–2)	Baylor (17–4)	Arkansas (17–6)												23.
24.	Wisconsin	Northwestern (2–3)	Arkansas (7–1)	Baylor (13–2)	UCF (16–2)	Baylor (17–5)												24.
25.	Missouri	Utah (5–0)	Virginia Tech (7–3)	UCF (13–2)	Fresno State (16–4)	UCF (19–5–1)												25.
	Preseason Jan 21	Week 1 Feb 10	Week 2 Feb 17	Week 3 Feb 24	Week 4 Mar 2	Week 5 Mar 9	Week 6	Week 7	Week 8	Week 9	Week 10	Week 11	Week 12	Week 13	Week 14	Week 15	Final	
		Dropped: No. 22 Auburn; No. 24 Wisconsin	Dropped: No. 24 Northwestern	Dropped: No. 18 Tennessee; No. 22 North Carolina	Dropped: No. 22 Texas Tech	None	None	None	None	None	None	None	None	None	None	None	None	

== Softball America ==
The final Softball America poll was announced on March 24, 2020 after the 2020 NCAA Division I softball season was cancelled due to COVID-19.

	Preseason Jan 28	Week 1 Feb 11	Week 2 Feb 18	Week 3 Fed 25	Week 4 Mar 3	Week 5 Mar 10	Week 6 Mar 24	Week 7	Week 8	Week 9	Week 10	Week 11	Week 12	Week 13	Week 14	Week 15	Final	
1.	Washington	Washington (5–0)	UCLA (11–0)	UCLA (15–0)	Texas (20–3)	Texas (24–3)	Texas (24–3)											1.
2.	Alabama	UCLA (6–0)	Texas (10–0)	Washington (15–1)	UCLA (19–1)	UCLA (25–1)	UCLA (25–1)											2.
3.	UCLA	Florida State (5–0)	Washington (10–1)	Texas (15–1)	Washington (19–2)	Washington (23–2)	Washington (23–2)											3.
4.	Oklahoma	Oklahoma (4–0)	Oklahoma (8–1)	Oklahoma (11–3)	Arizona (17–3)	Arizona (21–3)	Arizona (22–3)											4.
5.	Arizona	Texas (6–0)	Arizona (9–1)	Arizona (12–3)	Louisiana (14–5)	Oklahoma (20–4)	Oklahoma (20–4)											5.
6.	Minnesota	Arizona (5–0)	Michigan (9–0)	LSU (13–1)	Oklahoma (15–4)	LSU (20–3)	LSU (21–3)											6.
7.	Florida State	LSU (5–0)	Florida State (7–4)	Florida State (7–4)	LSU (16–3)	Florida (21–4)	Florida (23–4)											7.
8.	Louisiana	Michigan (5–0)	LSU (8–1)	Louisiana (11–3)	Florida (17–4)	Oklahoma State (18–5)	Oklahoma State (19–5)											8.
9.	Oklahoma State	Kentucky (4–0)	Louisiana (7–2)	Oregon (14–0)	Oklahoma State (13–5)	Louisiana (16–6)	Louisiana (18–6)											9.
10.	Texas	Missouri (5–0)	Oregon (9–0)	Florida (16–2)	Kentucky (17–3)	Florida State (17–6)	Florida State (17–7)											10.
11.	Florida	Alabama (1–3)	Florida (11–1)	Michigan (10–3)	Alabama (12–7)	Kentucky (19–4)	Kentucky (20–4)											11.
12.	Northwestern	Georgia (5–0)	Oklahoma State (6–3)	Alabama (9–5)	Florida State (10–6)	Alabama (14–8)	Alabama (14–8)											12.
13.	LSU	Oregon (5–0)	Alabama (4–5)	Oklahoma State (8–5)	Oregon (17–2)	Oregon (21–2)	Oregon (22–2)											13.
14.	Tennessee	Florida (4–1)	Kentucky (7–2)	Kentucky (12–3)	Georgia (20–4)	Georgia (22–5)	Georgia (23–5)											14.
15.	Michigan	Texas Tech (5–0)	Missouri (9–2)	Georgia (14–3)	Arizona State (16–6)	South Carolina (15–6)	South Carolina (17–6)											15.
16.	Georgia	South Carolina (4–0)	Arizona State (9–2)	South Carolina (10–3)	South Carolina (14–4)	Arizona State (21–7)	Arizona State (22–7)											16.
17.	Arkansas	Oklahoma State (2–2)	Minnesota (5–4)	Missouri (12–5)	Michigan (12–6)	Missouri (19–6)	Missouri (19–7)											17.
18.	Texas Tech	Louisiana (3–1)	Texas Tech (7–3)	Arizona State (12–5)	Missouri (15–6)	Virginia Tech (19–4)	Virginia Tech (21–4)											18.
19.	James Madison	Tennessee (3–1)	Tennessee (6–2)	Texas Tech (10–5)	Minnesota (12–7)	Michigan (15–8)	Michigan (15–8)											19.
20.	Kentucky	Arizona State (4–1)	Georgia (8–3)	Minnesota (8–6)	Arkansas (16–4)	Arkansas (17–6)	Arkansas (19–6)											20.
21.	Wisconsin	Minnesota (3–2)	Arkansas (7–1)	UCF (13–2)	UCF (16–2)	Minnesota (14–9–1)	Minnesota (15–9–1)											21.
22.	South Carolina	Arkansas (4–1)	South Carolina (5–3)	Virginia Tech (12–3)	Virginia Tech (16–4)	UCF (19–5–1)	UCF (21–5–1)											22.
23.	Auburn	James Madison (0–0)	Virginia Tech (7–3)	Arkansas (12–2)	Baylor (17–4)	Fresno State (21–4)	Fresno State (21–4)											23.
24.	Arizona State	Northwestern (2–3)	James Madison (2–1)	Baylor (13–2)	Utah (12–2)	Baylor (17–5)	Baylor (19–5)											24.
25.	Oregon	North Carolina (3–2)	Utah (7–2)	Utah (12–2)	Mississippi State (19–3)	Mississippi State (24–3)	Mississippi State (25–3)											25.
	Preseason Jan 28	Week 1 Feb 11	Week 2 Feb 18	Week 3 Fed 25	Week 4 Mar 3	Week 5 Mar 10	Week 6 Mar 24	Week 7	Week 8	Week 9	Week 10	Week 11	Week 12	Week 13	Week 14	Week 15	Final	
		Dropped: No. 21 Wisconsin; No. 23 Auburn	Dropped: No. 24 Northwestern; No. 25 North Carolina	Dropped: No. 19 Tennessee; No. 24 James Madison	Dropped: No. 19 Texas Tech	Dropped: No. 24 Utah	None	None	None	None	None	None	None	None	None	None	None	
