= 2020 Southeastern Conference softball season =

2020 SEC Softball Season
- League: NCAA Division I
- Sport: Softball
- Teams: 13

Regular Season

Tournament

Softball seasons
- ← 2019 2021 →

2020 Southeastern Conference softball standings
	Conf.				Overall
Team	W		L	PCT	W		L	PCT
No. 7 Florida ‍‍‍	3	–	0	1.000	23	–	4	.852
No. 23 Missouri ‍‍‍	3	–	0	1.000	19	–	7	.731
No. 11 Kentucky ‍‍‍	2	–	1	.667	20	–	4	.833
No. 14 Georgia ‍‍‍	2	–	1	.667	23	–	5	.821
No. 10 Alabama ‍‍‍	2	–	1	.667	14	–	8	.636
No. 20 Arkansas ‍‍‍	1	–	2	.333	19	–	6	.760
No. 16 South Carolina ‍‍‍	1	–	2	.333	17	–	6	.739
Texas A&M ‍‍‍	1	–	2	.333	17	–	9	.654
No. 21 Mississippi State ‍‍‍	0	–	0	–	25	–	3	.893
No. 5 LSU ‍‍‍	0	–	0	–	21	–	3	.875
Tennessee ‍‍‍	0	–	0	–	14	–	9	.609
Auburn ‍‍‍	0	–	3	.000	16	–	11	.593
Ole Miss ‍‍‍	0	–	3	.000	12	–	13	.480
† – Conference champion ‡ – Tournament champion y – Invited to the NCAA tournament As of March 13, 2020; Rankings from NFCA

The 2020 SEC softball season began with practices in January 2020, followed by the start of the 2020 NCAA Division I softball season in February. Conference will start in March 2020 and will conclude in May, followed by the 2020 Southeastern Conference softball tournament at Rhoads Stadium in Tuscaloosa, Alabama, in May. Vanderbilt University is the only full member of the Southeastern Conference to not sponsor a softball program.

== Preseason ==
=== SEC preseason poll ===
The SEC preseason poll was released on January 15, 2020.

Preseason poll
Predicted finish	Team
1	Alabama
2	Tennessee
3	LSU
4	Kentucky
5	Florida
6	Georgia
7	Arkansas
8	Ole Miss
9	South Carolina
10	Missouri
11	Auburn
12	Mississippi State; Texas A&M

== Head coaches ==
Note: Stats shown are before the beginning of the season. Overall and SEC records are from time at current school.

Team	Head coach	Previous job	Season at school	Overall record	SEC record	SEC titles	SEC Tournament titles	NCAA Regionals	NCAA Super Regionals	Women's College World Series	National Championships
Alabama	Patrick Murphy	Alabama (asst.)	22nd	1083–303	417–151	6	4	21	17	12	1
Arkansas	Courtney Deifel	Maryland	5th	128–100	32–64	0	0	3	1	0	0
Auburn	Mickey Dean	James Madison	3rd	80–38	21–26	0	0	2	0	0	0
Florida	Tim Walton	Wichita State	15th	727–152	260–75	7	4	14	12	10	2
Georgia	Lu Harris-Champer	Southern Miss	20th	902–340	306–197	2	1	18	10	4	0
Kentucky	Rachel Lawson	Western Kentucky	13th	432–277	140–161	0	0	11	7	1	0
LSU	Beth Torina	FIU	9th	360–155	110–85	0	0	8	6	4	0
Mississippi State	Samantha Ricketts	Mississippi State (AHC)	1st	0–0	0–0	0	0	0	0	0	0
Missouri	Larissa Anderson	Hofstra	2nd	35–25	12–12	0	0	1	0	0	0
Ole Miss	Ruben Felix	Ole Miss (asst.)	1st	0–0	0–0	0	0	0	0	0	0
South Carolina	Beverly Smith	North Carolina (AHC)	10th	310–211	77–145	0	0	7	1	0	0
Tennessee	Karen and Ralph Weekly	Chattanooga	19th	893-276–2	299-163–1	1	2	16	11	7	0
Texas A&M	Jo Evans	Utah	24th	907–442–2	72–91	0	0	20	7	3	0

== Conference matrix ==
	Alabama	Arkansas	Auburn	Florida	Georgia	Kentucky	LSU	Miss. State	Missouri	Ole Miss	S. Carolina	Tennessee	Texas A&M
vs. Alabama	–	0–0	0–0	0–0	0–0	0–0	0–0	0–0	0–0	0–0	0–0	0–0	0–0
vs. Arkansas	0–0	–	0–0	0–0	0–0	0–0	0–0	0–0	0–0	0–0	0–0	0–0	0–0
vs. Auburn	0–0	0–0	–	0–0	0–0	0–0	0–0	0–0	0–0	0–0	0–0	0–0	0–0
vs. Florida	0–0	0–0	0–0	–	0–0	0–0	0–0	0–0	0–0	0–0	0–0	0–0	0–0
vs. Georgia	0–0	0–0	0–0	0–0	–	0–0	0–0	0–0	0–0	0–0	0–0	0–0	0–0
vs. Kentucky	0–0	0–0	0–0	0–0	0–0	–	0–0	0–0	0–0	0–0	0–0	0–0	0–0
vs. LSU	0–0	0–0	0–0	0–0	0–0	0–0	–	0–0	0–0	0–0	0–0	0–0	0–0
vs. Miss. State	0–0	0–0	0–0	0–0	0–0	0–0	0–0	–	0–0	0–0	0–0	0–0	0–0
vs. Missouri	0–0	0–0	0–0	0–0	0–0	0–0	0–0	0–0	–	0–0	0–0	0–0	0–0
vs. Ole Miss	0–0	0–0	0–0	0–0	0–0	0–0	0–0	0–0	0-0	–	0–0	0–0	0–0
vs. South Carolina	0–0	0–0	0–0	0–0	0–0	0–0	0–0	0–0	0–0	0–0	–	0–0	0–0
vs. Tennessee	0–0	0–0	0–0	0–0	0–0	0–0	0–0	0–0	0–0	0–0	0–0	–	0–0
vs. Texas A&M	0–0	0–0	0–0	0–0	0–0	0–0	0–0	0–0	0-0	0–0	0–0	0–0	–
Total	0–0	0–0	0–0	0–0	0–0	0–0	0–0	0–0	0–0	0–0	0–0	0–0	0–0
