= 2020 Texas A&M Aggies softball team =

American college softball season

2020 Texas A&M Aggies softball
- Conference: Southeastern Conference
- Record: 3–3 (0–0 SEC)
- Head coach: Jo Evans (24th season)
- Assistant coaches: Kara Dill; Craig Snider
- Home stadium: Davis Diamond

2020 Southeastern Conference softball standings
	Conf.				Overall
Team	W		L	PCT	W		L	PCT
No. 7 Florida ‍‍‍	3	–	0	1.000	23	–	4	.852
No. 23 Missouri ‍‍‍	3	–	0	1.000	19	–	7	.731
No. 11 Kentucky ‍‍‍	2	–	1	.667	20	–	4	.833
No. 14 Georgia ‍‍‍	2	–	1	.667	23	–	5	.821
No. 10 Alabama ‍‍‍	2	–	1	.667	14	–	8	.636
No. 20 Arkansas ‍‍‍	1	–	2	.333	19	–	6	.760
No. 16 South Carolina ‍‍‍	1	–	2	.333	17	–	6	.739
Texas A&M ‍‍‍	1	–	2	.333	17	–	9	.654
No. 21 Mississippi State ‍‍‍	0	–	0	–	25	–	3	.893
No. 5 LSU ‍‍‍	0	–	0	–	21	–	3	.875
Tennessee ‍‍‍	0	–	0	–	14	–	9	.609
Auburn ‍‍‍	0	–	3	.000	16	–	11	.593
Ole Miss ‍‍‍	0	–	3	.000	12	–	13	.480
† – Conference champion ‡ – Tournament champion y – Invited to the NCAA tournament As of March 13, 2020; Rankings from NFCA

The 2020 Texas A&M Aggies softball team represented Texas A&M University in the 2020 NCAA Division I softball season. The Aggies played their home games at Davis Diamond.

== Previous season ==
The Aggies finished the 2019 season 28–27 overall, and 6–18 in the SEC to finish last in the conference. The Aggies went 0–2 in the Austin Regional during the 2019 NCAA Division I softball tournament.

== Preseason ==
=== SEC preseason poll ===
The SEC preseason poll was released on January 15, 2020.

Media poll
Predicted finish	Team
1	Alabama
2	Tennessee
3	LSU
4	Kentucky
5	Florida
6	Georgia
7	Arkansas
8	Ole Miss
9	South Carolina
10	Missouri
11	Auburn
12	Mississippi State; Texas A&M

== Schedule and results ==
2020 Texas A&M Aggies Softball Game Log
Regular season

February
Date	Opponent	Rank	Site/stadium	Score	Win	Loss	Save	TV	Attendance	Overall record	SEC record
February 7	UT Arlington		Davis Diamond; College Station, TX	**W** 2–0	**M. Herzog** (1–0)	J. Valencia (0–1)		SECN+		1–0	
February 7	UT Arlington		Davis Diamond	**L** 2–7	R. Phillips (1–0)	**K. Potts** (0–1)		SECN+	1,062	1–1	
February 8	Abilene Christian		Davis Diamond	**W** 7–1	**K. Poynter** (1–0)	S. Bradley (0–1)		SECN+		2–1	
February 8	UT Arlington		Davis Diamond	**L** 4–5 (8)	A. Gardiner (1–0)	**P. McBride** (0–1)		SECN+	1,535	2–2	
February 9	Abilene Christian		Davis Diamond	**W** 10–6	**K. Poynter** (2–0)	A. Sinnott (1–1)		SECN+		3–2	
February 13	McNeese State		Davis Diamond	**L** 0–1	S. Flores (2–0)	**K. Poynter** (2–1)	W. Tate (1)	SECN+	827	3–3	
February 14	Lamar		Davis Diamond					SECN+			
February 14	St. John's		Davis Diamond					SECN+			
February 15	Lamar		Davis Diamond								
February 15	Binghamton		Davis Diamond								
February 16	St. John's		Davis Diamond								
February 20	vs. Bethune–Cookman; Mary Nutter Classic		Big League Dreams; Cathedral City, CA								
February 20	vs. No. 5 Arizona; Mary Nutter Classic		Big League Dreams								
February 21	vs. No. 3 Oklahoma; Mary Nutter Classic		Big League Dreams								
February 21	vs. No. 1 UCLA; Mary Nutter Classic		Big League Dreams								
February 22	vs. UC Davis; Mary Nutter Classic		Big League Dreams								
February 26	Sam Houston State		Davis Diamond								
February 26	Sam Houston State		Davis Diamond								
February 28	Southeastern Louisiana		Davis Diamond								
February 29	Southeastern Louisiana		Davis Diamond								
February 29	Kansas		Davis Diamond								

March
Date	Opponent	Rank	Site/stadium	Score	Win	Loss	Save	TV	Attendance	Overall record	SEC record
March 1	Kansas		Davis Diamond								
March 7	at Kentucky		John Cropp Stadium; Lexington, KY								
March 8	at Kentucky		John Cropp Stadium								
March 9	at Kentucky		John Cropp Stadium								
March 11	Texas State		Davis Diamond								
March 13	Tennessee		Davis Diamond								
March 14	Tennessee		Davis Diamond								
March 15	Tennessee		Davis Diamond								
March 17	Stephen F. Austin		Davis Diamond								
March 20	at Ole Miss		Ole Miss Softball Complex; Oxford, MS								
March 21	at Ole Miss		Ole Miss Softball Complex								
March 22	at Ole Miss		Ole Miss Softball Complex								
March 24	Texas Southern		Davis Diamond								
March 24	Texas Southern		Davis Diamond								
March 27	Missouri		Davis Diamond								
March 28	Missouri		Davis Diamond								
March 29	Missouri		Davis Diamond								

April
Date	Opponent	Rank	Site/stadium	Score	Win	Loss	Save	TV	Attendance	Overall record	SEC record
April 3	at Arkansas		Bogle Park; Fayetteville, AR								
April 4	at Arkansas		Bogle Park								
April 5	at Arkansas		Bogle Park								
April 9	Georgia		Davis Diamond								
April 10	Georgia		Davis Diamond								
April 11	Georgia		Davis Diamond								
April 15	Houston		Davis Diamond								
April 17	at South Carolina		Carolina Softball Stadium; Columbia, SC								
April 18	at South Carolina		Carolina Softball Stadium								
April 19	at South Carolina		Carolina Softball Stadium								
April 24	UNC Greensboro		Davis Diamond								
April 25	UNC Greensboro		Davis Diamond								
April 26	UNC Greensboro		Davis Diamond								

May
Date	Opponent	Rank	Site/stadium	Score	Win	Loss	Save	TV	Attendance	Overall record	SEC record
May 1	Mississippi State		Davis Diamond								
May 2	Mississippi State		Davis Diamond								
May 3	Mississippi State		Davis Diamond								

Post-season

SEC Tournament
Date	Opponent	Seed	Site/stadium	Score	Win	Loss	Save	TV	Attendance	Overall record	SECT Record
May 6–9			Rhoads Stadium; Tuscaloosa, AL								

Legend: = Win = Loss = Cancelled
Bold = Texas A&M team member

*Rankings are based on the team's current ranking in the NFCA poll.

== Rankings ==
Ranking movements Legend: ██ Increase in ranking ██ Decrease in ranking — = Not ranked RV = Received votes
	Week																
Poll	Pre	1	2	3	4	5	6	7	8	9	10	11	12	13	14	15	Final
NFCA / USA Today	—	—	—	—	—	—											
Softball America	—	—	—	—	—	—											
ESPN.com/USA Softball	—	—	—	—	—	RV											
D1Softball	—	—	—	—	—	—											
