= 2020 Georgia Bulldogs softball team =

2020 Georgia Bulldogs softball
- Conference: Southeastern Conference

Ranking
- Coaches: No. 15
- Record: 7–0 (0–0 SEC)
- Head coach: Lu Harris-Champer (20th season)
- Assistant coaches: Tony Baldwin; Rachele Fico
- Home stadium: Turner Softball Stadium

2020 Southeastern Conference softball standings
| | Conf. | | | | Overall |
| Team | W | | L | PCT | W | | L | PCT |
|---|---|---|---|---|---|---|---|---|
| No. 7 Florida ‍‍‍ | 3 | – | 0 | 1.000 | 23 | – | 4 | .852 |
| No. 23 Missouri ‍‍‍ | 3 | – | 0 | 1.000 | 19 | – | 7 | .731 |
| No. 11 Kentucky ‍‍‍ | 2 | – | 1 | .667 | 20 | – | 4 | .833 |
| No. 14 Georgia ‍‍‍ | 2 | – | 1 | .667 | 23 | – | 5 | .821 |
| No. 10 Alabama ‍‍‍ | 2 | – | 1 | .667 | 14 | – | 8 | .636 |
| No. 20 Arkansas ‍‍‍ | 1 | – | 2 | .333 | 19 | – | 6 | .760 |
| No. 16 South Carolina ‍‍‍ | 1 | – | 2 | .333 | 17 | – | 6 | .739 |
| Texas A&M ‍‍‍ | 1 | – | 2 | .333 | 17 | – | 9 | .654 |
| No. 21 Mississippi State ‍‍‍ | 0 | – | 0 | – | 25 | – | 3 | .893 |
| No. 5 LSU ‍‍‍ | 0 | – | 0 | – | 21 | – | 3 | .875 |
| Tennessee ‍‍‍ | 0 | – | 0 | – | 14 | – | 9 | .609 |
| Auburn ‍‍‍ | 0 | – | 3 | .000 | 16 | – | 11 | .593 |
| Ole Miss ‍‍‍ | 0 | – | 3 | .000 | 12 | – | 13 | .480 |
† – Conference champion ‡ – Tournament champion y – Invited to the NCAA tournament As of March 13, 2020; Rankings from NFCA

The 2020 Georgia Bulldogs softball team represented the University of Georgia in the 2020 NCAA Division I softball season. The Bulldogs played their home games at Turner Softball Stadium.

== Previous season ==
The Bulldogs finished the 2019 season 42–19 overall, and 12–12 in the SEC to finish in a tie for sixth in the conference. The Bulldogs went 2–2 in the Minneapolis Regional during the 2019 NCAA Division I softball tournament.

== Preseason ==
=== SEC preseason poll ===
The SEC preseason poll was released on January 15, 2020.

Media poll
| Predicted finish | Team |
| 1 | Alabama |
| 2 | Tennessee |
| 3 | LSU |
| 4 | Kentucky |
| 5 | Florida |
| 6 | Georgia |
| 7 | Arkansas |
| 8 | Ole Miss |
| 9 | South Carolina |
| 10 | Missouri |
| 11 | Auburn |
| 12 | Mississippi State; Texas A&M |

== Schedule and results ==
2020 Georgia Bulldogs Softball Game Log
Regular season

February
| Date | Opponent | Rank | Site/stadium | Score | Win | Loss | Save | TV | Attendance | Overall record | SEC record |
|---|---|---|---|---|---|---|---|---|---|---|---|
| February 7 | Howard | No. 16 | Turner Softball Stadium | **W** 11–1 (5) | **M. Avant** (1–0) | S. Hixenbaugh (0–1) | | | 235 | 1–0 | |
| February 7 | Kent State | No. 16 | Turner Softball Stadium | **W** 10–1 (5) | **L. Mathis** (1–0) | A. Scali (0–1) | | | 235 | 2–0 | |
| February 8 | Kent State | No. 16 | Turner Softball Stadium | Cancelled | | | | | | | |
| February 8 | UNC Wilmington | No. 16 | Turner Softball Stadium | **W** 8–0 | **L. Mathis** (2–0) | R. Pate (1–1) | | | 187 | 3–0 | |
| February 9 | UNC Wilmington | No. 16 | Turner Softball Stadium | **W** 10–2 (5) | **M. Avant** (2–0) | J. Gamache (0–2) | | | 478 | 4–0 | |
| February 9 | Howard | No. 16 | Turner Softball Stadium | **W** 8–0 (6) | **L. Mathis** (3–0) | R. Thomas (0–1) | | | 478 | 5–0 | |
| February 12 | at Georgia State | No. 15 | Heck Softball Complex; Atlanta, GA | **W** 10–1 (6) | **M. Avant** (3–0) | S. Mooney (1–2) | | | 307 | 6–0 | |
| February 14 | vs. Kansas; St. Pete/Clearwater Elite Invitational | No. 15 | Eddie C. Moore Complex; Clearwater, FL | **W** 11–0 (5) | **M. Avant** (4–0) | H. Todd (0–1) | | | 653 | 7–0 | |
| February 14 | vs. No. 21 Northwestern; St. Pete/Clearwater Elite Invitational | No. 15 | Eddie C. Moore Complex | **W** 8-3 | **A. Cutting** (1-0) | D. Williams 0-3 | | | 650 | 8-0 | |
| February 15 | vs. No. 17 Texas Tech; St. Pete/Clearwater Elite Invitational | No. 15 | Eddie C. Moore Complex | | | | | | | | |
| February 15 | vs. No. 3 UCLA; St. Pete/Clearwater Elite Invitational | No. 15 | Eddie C. Moore Complex | | | | | | | | |
| February 16 | vs. South Florida; St. Pete/Clearwater Elite Invitational | No. 15 | Eddie C. Moore Complex | | | | | | | | |
| February 19 | Samford | No. 19 | Turner Softball Stadium | **W** 8-0 (5. inn) | **L. Mathis** (4-0) | T. DeCelles (1-3) | | | 225 | 9-3 | |
| February 21 | Central Michigan | No. 19 | Turner Softball Stadium | | | | | | | | |
| February 21 | No. 21 James Madison | No. 19 | Turner Softball Stadium | | | | | | | | |
| February 22 | No. 21 James Madison | No. 19 | Turner Softball Stadium | **W**13-5 (6 inn) | **M. Avant** (5-2) | K. Boseman (2-2) | | | 523 | 12-3 | |
| February 22 | Central Michigan | No. 19 | Turner Softball Stadium | **W** 7-4 | **L. Mathis** (5-0) | K. Bean 1-3 | | | 497 | 13-3 | |
| February 23 | Austin Peay | No. 19 | Turner Softball Stadium | | | | | | | | |
| February 25 | Alabama State | No. 14 | Turner Softball Stadium | | | | | | | | |
| February 26 | at Clemson | No. 14 | Clemson Softball Stadium; Clemson, SC | | | | | | | | |
| February 28 | Eastern Illinois | No. 14 | Turner Softball Stadium | **W** 4-0 | **M. Avant** (7-3) | J. Montgomery 5-3 | | | 136 | 16-4 | |
| February 28 | Boston College | No. 14 | Turner Softball Stadium | **W** 6-2 | **A. Cutting** (4-1) | A. Susannah 6-6 | | | 136 | 17-4 | |
| February 29 | Boston College | No. 14 | Turner Softball Stadium | | | | | | | | |
| February 29 | Western Carolina | No. 14 | Turner Softball Stadium | | | | | | | | |

March
| Date | Opponent | Rank | Site/stadium | Score | Win | Loss | Save | TV | Attendance | Overall record | SEC record |
|---|---|---|---|---|---|---|---|---|---|---|---|
| March 1 | Western Carolina | No. 14 | Turner Softball Stadium | | | | | | | | |
| March 4 | Georgia Tech | | Turner Softball Stadium | | | | | | | | |
| March 6 | South Carolina | | Turner Softball Stadium | | | | | | | | |
| March 7 | South Carolina | | Turner Softball Stadium | | | | | | | | |
| March 8 | South Carolina | | Turner Softball Stadium | | | | | | | | |
| March 11 | Furman | | Turner Softball Stadium | | | | | | | | |
| March 11 | Furman | | Turner Softball Stadium | | | | | | | | |
| March 13 | at Arkansas | | Bogle Park; Fayetteville, AR | | | | | | | | |
| March 14 | at Arkansas | | Bogle Park | | | | | | | | |
| March 15 | at Arkansas | | Bogle Park | | | | | | | | |
| March 18 | Oklahoma State | | Turner Softball Stadium | | | | | | | | |
| March 20 | Auburn | | Turner Softball Stadium | | | | | | | | |
| March 21 | Auburn | | Turner Softball Stadium | | | | | | | | |
| March 22 | Auburn | | Turner Softball Stadium | | | | | | | | |
| March 25 | USC Upstate | | Turner Softball Stadium | | | | | | | | |
| March 27 | at LSU | | Tiger Park; Baton Rouge, LA | | | | | | | | |
| March 28 | at LSU | | Tiger Park | | | | | | | | |
| March 29 | at LSU | | Tiger Park | | | | | | | | |

April
| Date | Opponent | Rank | Site/stadium | Score | Win | Loss | Save | TV | Attendance | Overall record | SEC record |
|---|---|---|---|---|---|---|---|---|---|---|---|
| April 1 | North Alabama | | Turner Softball Stadium; Athens, GA | | | | | | | | |
| April 4 | Kentucky | | Turner Softball Stadium | | | | | | | | |
| April 5 | Kentucky | | Turner Softball Stadium | | | | | | | | |
| April 6 | Kentucky | | Turner Softball Stadium | | | | | | | | |
| April 9 | at Texas A&M | | Davis Diamond; College Station, TX | | | | | | | | |
| April 10 | at Texas A&M | | Davis Diamond | | | | | | | | |
| April 11 | at Texas A&M | | Davis Diamond | | | | | | | | |
| April 15 | Georgia State | | Turner Softball Stadium | | | | | | | | |
| April 17 | Mississippi State | | Turner Softball Stadium | | | | | | | | |
| April 18 | Mississippi State | | Turner Softball Stadium | | | | | | | | |
| April 19 | Mississippi State | | Turner Softball Stadium | | | | | | | | |
| April 24 | at Florida | | Katie Seashole Pressly Softball Stadium; Gainesville, FL | | | | | | | | |
| April 25 | at Florida | | Katie Seashole Pressly Softball Stadium | | | | | | | | |
| April 26 | at Florida | | Katie Seashole Pressly Softball Stadium | | | | | | | | |

Post-season

SEC Tournament
| Date | Opponent | Seed | Site/stadium | Score | Win | Loss | Save | TV | Attendance | Overall record | SECT Record |
|---|---|---|---|---|---|---|---|---|---|---|---|
| May 6–9 | | | Rhoads Stadium; Tuscaloosa, AL | | | | | | | | |

Legend: = Win = Loss = Cancelled
Bold = Georgia team member

*Rankings are based on the team's current ranking in the NFCA poll.

== Rankings ==
Ranking movements Legend: ██ Increase in ranking ██ Decrease in ranking
| | Week | | | | | | | | | | | | | | | | |
| Poll | Pre | 1 | 2 | 3 | 4 | 5 | 6 | 7 | 8 | 9 | 10 | 11 | 12 | 13 | 14 | 15 | Final |
|---|---|---|---|---|---|---|---|---|---|---|---|---|---|---|---|---|---|
| NFCA / USA Today | 16 | 15 | 19 | 14 | 13 | 14 | | | | | | | | | | | |
| Softball America | 16 | 12 | 20 | 15 | 14 | 14 | | | | | | | | | | | |
| ESPN.com/USA Softball | 17 | 15 | 18 | 15 | 14 | 14 | | | | | | | | | | | |
| D1Softball | 15 | 18 | 20 | 15 | 14 | 14 | | | | | | | | | | | |
