= 2020 Missouri Tigers softball team =

Softball team

2020 Missouri Tigers softball
- Conference: Southeastern Conference

Ranking
- Coaches: No. 19
- Record: 6–0 (0–0 SEC)
- Head coach: Larissa Anderson (2nd season)
- Assistant coaches: Chris Malveaux; Sara Michalowski-Marino
- Home stadium: Mizzou Softball Stadium

2020 Southeastern Conference softball standings
	Conf.				Overall
Team	W		L	PCT	W		L	PCT
No. 7 Florida ‍‍‍	3	–	0	1.000	23	–	4	.852
No. 23 Missouri ‍‍‍	3	–	0	1.000	19	–	7	.731
No. 11 Kentucky ‍‍‍	2	–	1	.667	20	–	4	.833
No. 14 Georgia ‍‍‍	2	–	1	.667	23	–	5	.821
No. 10 Alabama ‍‍‍	2	–	1	.667	14	–	8	.636
No. 20 Arkansas ‍‍‍	1	–	2	.333	19	–	6	.760
No. 16 South Carolina ‍‍‍	1	–	2	.333	17	–	6	.739
Texas A&M ‍‍‍	1	–	2	.333	17	–	9	.654
No. 21 Mississippi State ‍‍‍	0	–	0	–	25	–	3	.893
No. 5 LSU ‍‍‍	0	–	0	–	21	–	3	.875
Tennessee ‍‍‍	0	–	0	–	14	–	9	.609
Auburn ‍‍‍	0	–	3	.000	16	–	11	.593
Ole Miss ‍‍‍	0	–	3	.000	12	–	13	.480
† – Conference champion ‡ – Tournament champion y – Invited to the NCAA tournament As of March 13, 2020; Rankings from NFCA

The 2020 Missouri Tigers softball team represented the University of Missouri in the 2020 NCAA Division I softball season. The Tigers played their home games at Mizzou Softball Stadium.

== Previous season ==
The Tigers finished the 2019 season 35–25 overall, and 12–12 in the SEC to finish in a tie for sixth in the conference. The Tigers went 3–2 in the Los Angeles Regional during the 2019 NCAA Division I softball tournament.

== Preseason ==
=== SEC preseason poll ===
The SEC preseason poll was released on January 15, 2020.

Media poll
Predicted finish	Team
1	Alabama
2	Tennessee
3	LSU
4	Kentucky
5	Florida
6	Georgia
7	Arkansas
8	Ole Miss
9	South Carolina
10	Missouri
11	Auburn
12	Mississippi State; Texas A&M

== Schedule and results ==
2020 Missouri Tigers Softball Game Log
Regular season

February
Date	Opponent	Rank	Site/stadium	Score	Win	Loss	Save	TV	Attendance	Overall record	SEC record
February 7	vs. Notre Dame; NFCA D1 Leadoff Classic		Eddie C. Moore Complex; Clearwater, FL	**W** 3–1	**J. Weber** (1–0)	P. Tidd (0–1)	**E. Daniel** (1)			1–0	
February 7	vs. South Alabama; NFCA D1 Leadoff Classic		Eddie C. Moore Complex	**W** 7–5	**S. Dandola** (1–0)	A. Hughen (0–1)	**E. Daniel** (2)		155	2–0	
February 8	vs. Baylor; NFCA D1 Leadoff Classic		Eddie C. Moore Complex	**W** 9–1 (5)	**E. Nichols** (1–0)	G. Rodoni (1–1)			155	3–0	
February 8	vs. No. 8 Minnesota; NFCA D1 Leadoff Classic		Eddie C. Moore Complex	**W** 7–4	**E. Daniel** (1–0)	A. Fisher (1–1)				4–0	
February 9	vs. Louisville; NFCA D1 Leadoff Classic		Eddie C. Moore Complex	**W** 5–1	**M. Schumacher** (1–0)	C. Harris (0–3)			155	5–0	
February 13	vs. Kansas; St. Pete/Clearwater Elite Invitational	No. 19	Eddie C. Moore Complex	**W** 8–0 (5)	**M. Schumacher** (2–0)			ESPNU	300	6–0	
February 14	vs. Liberty; St. Pete/Clearwater Elite Invitational	No. 19	Eddie C. Moore Complex					ESPN3			
February 14	vs. No. 16 Oklahoma State; St. Pete/Clearwater Elite Invitational	No. 19	Eddie C. Moore Complex					ESPN3			
February 15	vs. Virginia Tech; St. Pete/Clearwater Elite Invitational	No. 19	Eddie C. Moore Complex					ESPN3			
February 15	vs. No. 20 James Madison; St. Pete/Clearwater Elite Invitational	No. 19	Eddie C. Moore Complex					ESPN3			
February 16	vs. No. 14 Minnesota; St. Pete/Clearwater Elite Invitational	No. 19	Eddie C. Moore Complex					ESPN3			
February 20	vs. No. 5 Arizona; Mary Nutter Classic	No. 18	Big League Dreams; Cathedral City, CA								
February 21	vs. Oregon State; Mary Nutter Classic	No. 18	Big League Dreams								
February 21	vs. UC Davis; Mary Nutter Classic	No. 18	Big League Dreams								
February 22	vs. New Mexico; Mary Nutter Classic	No. 18	Big League Dreams								
February 22	vs. California; Mary Nutter Classic	No. 18	Big League Dreams								
February 23	vs. Seattle; Mary Nutter Classic	No. 18	Big League Dreams								
February 29	Wichita State	No. 21	Mizzou Softball Stadium; Columbia, MO								
February 29	Nebraska	No. 21	Mizzou Softball Stadium								

March
Date	Opponent	Rank	Site/stadium	Score	Win	Loss	Save	TV	Attendance	Overall record	SEC record
March 1	Nebraska	No. 21	Mizzou Softball Stadium								
March 1	Wichita State	No. 21	Mizzou Softball Stadium								
March 4	Kansas City		Mizzou Softball Stadium								
March 6	Ole Miss		Mizzou Softball Stadium								
March 7	Ole Miss		Mizzou Softball Stadium								
March 8	Ole Miss		Mizzou Softball Stadium								
March 11	vs. Illinois		Bridgeton Athletic Complex; Bridgeton, MO								
March 14	at Auburn		Jane B. Moore Field; Auburn, AL								
March 15	at Auburn		Jane B. Moore Field								
March 16	at Auburn		Jane B. Moore Field								
March 20	Arkansas		Mizzou Softball Stadium								
March 21	Arkansas		Mizzou Softball Stadium								
March 22	Arkansas		Mizzou Softball Stadium								
March 24	Missouri State		Mizzou Softball Stadium								
March 25	at Iowa		Bob Pearl Softball Field; Iowa City, IA								
March 25	at Iowa		Bob Pearl Softball Field								
March 27	at Texas A&M		Davis Diamond; College Station, TX								
March 28	at Texas A&M		Davis Diamond								
March 29	at Texas A&M		Davis Diamond								

April
Date	Opponent	Rank	Site/stadium	Score	Win	Loss	Save	TV	Attendance	Overall record	SEC record
April 1	SIU Edwardsville		Mizzou Softball Stadium								
April 9	at Florida		Katie Seashole Pressly Softball Stadium; Gainesville, FL								
April 10	at Florida		Katie Seashole Pressly Softball Stadium								
April 11	at Florida		Katie Seashole Pressly Softball Stadium								
April 14	Saint Louis		Mizzou Softball Stadium								
April 17	Kentucky		Mizzou Softball Stadium								
April 18	Kentucky		Mizzou Softball Stadium								
April 19	Kentucky		Mizzou Softball Stadium								
April 22	at Southeast Missouri State		Southeast Softball Complex; Cape Girardeau, MO								
April 22	at Southeast Missouri State		Southeast Softball Complex								
April 24	at LSU		Tiger Park; Baton Rouge, LA								
April 25	at LSU		Tiger Park								
April 26	at LSU		Tiger Park								

May
Date	Opponent	Rank	Site/stadium	Score	Win	Loss	Save	TV	Attendance	Overall record	SEC record
May 1	Alabama		Mizzou Softball Stadium								
May 2	Alabama		Mizzou Softball Stadium								
May 3	Alabama		Mizzou Softball Stadium								

Postseason

SEC Tournament
Date	Opponent	Seed	Site/stadium	Score	Win	Loss	Save	TV	Attendance	Overall record	SECT Record
May 6–9			Rhoads Stadium; Tuscaloosa, AL								

Legend: = Win = Loss = Cancelled
Bold = Missouri team member

*Rankings are based on the team's current ranking in the NFCA poll.

== Rankings ==
Ranking movements Legend: ██ Increase in ranking ██ Decrease in ranking — = Not ranked RV = Received votes
	Week																
Poll	Pre	1	2	3	4	5	6	7	8	9	10	11	12	13	14	15	Final
NFCA / USA Today	RV	19	18	21	23	23											
Softball America	—	10	15	17	18	17											
ESPN.com/USA Softball	RV	18	19	23	24	24											
D1Softball	25	16	15	16	16	15											
