= 2020 Mississippi State Bulldogs softball team =

American college softball season

2020 Mississippi State Bulldogs softball
- Conference: Southeastern Conference
- Record: 25–3 (0–0 SEC)
- Head coach: Samantha Ricketts (1st season)
- Assistant coaches: Tyler Bratton; Josh Johnson
- Home stadium: Nusz Park

2020 Southeastern Conference softball standings
	Conf.				Overall
Team	W		L	PCT	W		L	PCT
No. 7 Florida ‍‍‍	3	–	0	1.000	23	–	4	.852
No. 23 Missouri ‍‍‍	3	–	0	1.000	19	–	7	.731
No. 11 Kentucky ‍‍‍	2	–	1	.667	20	–	4	.833
No. 14 Georgia ‍‍‍	2	–	1	.667	23	–	5	.821
No. 10 Alabama ‍‍‍	2	–	1	.667	14	–	8	.636
No. 20 Arkansas ‍‍‍	1	–	2	.333	19	–	6	.760
No. 16 South Carolina ‍‍‍	1	–	2	.333	17	–	6	.739
Texas A&M ‍‍‍	1	–	2	.333	17	–	9	.654
No. 21 Mississippi State ‍‍‍	0	–	0	–	25	–	3	.893
No. 5 LSU ‍‍‍	0	–	0	–	21	–	3	.875
Tennessee ‍‍‍	0	–	0	–	14	–	9	.609
Auburn ‍‍‍	0	–	3	.000	16	–	11	.593
Ole Miss ‍‍‍	0	–	3	.000	12	–	13	.480
† – Conference champion ‡ – Tournament champion y – Invited to the NCAA tournament As of March 13, 2020; Rankings from NFCA

The 2020 Mississippi State Bulldogs softball team represented Mississippi State University in the 2020 NCAA Division I softball season. The Bulldogs played their home games at Nusz Park.

== Previous season ==
The Bulldogs finished the 2019 season 35–23 overall, and 9–15 in the SEC to finish in twelfth in the conference. The Bulldogs went 2–2 in the Seattle Regional during the 2019 NCAA Division I softball tournament.

== Preseason ==
=== SEC preseason poll ===
The SEC preseason poll was released on January 15, 2020.

Media poll
Predicted finish	Team
1	Alabama
2	Tennessee
3	LSU
4	Kentucky
5	Florida
6	Georgia
7	Arkansas
8	Ole Miss
9	South Carolina
10	Missouri
11	Auburn
12	Mississippi State; Texas A&M

== Schedule and results ==
2020 Mississippi State Bulldogs Softball Game Log
Regular season

February
Date	Opponent	Rank	Site/stadium	Score	Win	Loss	Save	TV	Attendance	Overall record	SEC record
February 7	vs. Missouri State; NFCA D1 Leadoff Classic		Eddie C. Moore Complex; Clearwater, FL	**W** 5–0	**A. Willis** (1–0)	E. Griesbauer (0–1)				1–0	
February 7	vs. (United States) USA National Team; Exhibition		Eddie C. Moore Complex	**L** 0–4	M. Abbott	**A. Loza**				Exh.	
February 8	vs. Liberty; NFCA D1 Leadoff Classic		Eddie C. Moore Complex	**W** 9–2	**G. Fagan** (1–0)	K. Belogorska (0–1)				2–0	
February 8	vs. Louisville; NFCA D1 Leadoff Classic		Eddie C. Moore Complex	**W** 3–2 (8)	**E. Williams** (1–0)	T. Roby (1–1)			189	3–0	
February 9	vs. NC State; NFCA D1 Leadoff Classic		Eddie C. Moore Complex	**W** 9–0 (5)	**G. Fagan** (2–0)	S. Nester (1–2)			1,370	4–0	
February 12	Alabama State		Nusz Park; Starkville, MS	**W** 16–2 (5)	**K. Hawk** (1–0)	V. Bradford (0–3)		SECN+	109	5–0	
February 14	Tulsa; Bulldog Kickoff Classic		Nusz Park	**L** 1–2	C. Delce (3–0)	**G. Fagan** (2–1)	K. Scott (2)	SECN+	127	5–1	
February 14	North Alabama; Bulldog Kickoff Classic		Nusz Park	**W** 6–0	**A. Willis** (2–0)	M. Garst (2–1)		SECN+	157	6–1	
February 15	Tennessee State; Bulldog Kickoff Classic		Nusz Park	**W** 3–0	**K. Hawk** (2–0)	L. Powell (0–4)	**E. Williams** (1)	SECN+	327	7–1	
February 15	North Alabama; Bulldog Kickoff Classic		Nusz Park	**W** 9–1 (6)	**G. Fagan** (3–1)	M. Moore (0–1)	**E. Williams** (2)	SECN+	348	8–1	
February 16	Tennessee State; Bulldog Kickoff Classic		Nusz Park	**W** 4–0	**E. Williams** (2–0)	A. Woodall (0–2)	**A. Willis** (1)	SECN+	237	9–1	
February 18	at Southeastern Louisiana		North Oak Park; Hammond, LA	Postponed/Weather							
February 20	vs. Oregon State; Mary Nutter Classic		Big League Dreams; Cathedral City, CA	**W** 1–0	**G. Fagan** (4–1)	M. Mazon (4–3)	**E. Williams** (3)		212	10–1	
February 20	vs. No. 15 Oregon; Mary Nutter Classic		Big League Dreams	**L** 2–7	J. Dail (2–0)	**A. Willis** (2–1)	B. Yanez (1)		200	10–2	
February 21	vs. UC Riverside; Mary Nutter Classic		Big League Dreams	**W** 6–3	**A. Loza** (1–0)	M. Casper (0–2)			312	11–2	
February 22	vs. BYU; Mary Nutter Classic		Big League Dreams	**L** 2–6	A. Moffat (3–3)	**G. Fagan** (4–2)			212	11–3	
February 22	vs. San Diego State; Mary Nutter Classic		Big League Dreams	**W** 10–4	**A. Willis** (3–1)	M. Balint (4–3)			187	12–3	
February 26	Central Arkansas		Nusz Park	**W** 6–3	**A. Willis** (4–1)	R. Sanchez (1–3)	**E. Williams** (4)	SECN+	89	13–3	
February 28	UAB; The Snowman (Alex Wilcox Memorial)		Nusz Park	**W** 16–6 (5)	**A. Willis** (5–1)	S. Cespedes (1–4)		SECN+	157	14–3	
February 29	UAB; The Snowman (Alex Wilcox Memorial)		Nusz Park	**W** 5–0	**E. Williams** (3–0)	J. Cook (3–1)		SECN+	396	15–3	
February 29	Alcorn State; The Snowman (Alex Wilcox Memorial)		Nusz Park	**W** 8–1	**A. Willis** (6–1)	A. Dorsey (2–6)		SECN+	642	16–3	

March
Date	Opponent	Rank	Site/stadium	Score	Win	Loss	Save	TV	Attendance	Overall record	SEC record
March 1	Alcorn State; The Snowman (Alex Wilcox Memorial)		Nusz Park	**W** 9–1 (5)	**C. Denis** (1–0)	B. Ursin (2–8)		SECN+	187	17–3	
March 1	UT Martin; The Snowman (Alex Wilcox Memorial)		Nusz Park	**W** 6–1	**A. Willis** (7–1)	H. Ridolif (4–2)		SECN+	475	18–3	
March 3	UT Martin		Nusz Park	**W** 6–0	**E. Williams** (4–0)	S. Layne (2–4)		SECN+	88	19–3	
March 6	Bryant; Bulldog Slamboree	No. 24	Nusz Park	**W** 5-1	**G. Fagan** (5-2)	K. Kenney (1-1)		SEC+	275	20-3	
March 6	Mississippi Valley State; Bulldog Slamboree	No. 24	Nusz Park	**W** 6-0	**A. Willis** (8-1)	A. Montes (1-2)		SEC+	387	21-3	
March 7	Southeast Missouri State; Bulldog Slamboree	No. 24	Nusz Park	**W** 2-0	**E. Williams** (5-0)	P. Holman (2-3)		SEC+	305	22-3	
March 7	Mississippi Valley State; Bulldog Slamboree	No. 24	Nusz Park	**W** 20-3 (5 in.)	**G. Fagan** (6-2)	D. Page (0-1)			448	23-3	
March 8	Southeast Missouri State; Bulldog Slamboree	No. 24	Nusz Park	**W** 2-0	**A. Willis** (9-1)	R. Rook (4-2)	**E. Williams** (5)	SEC+	342	24-3	
March 11	at Southern Miss		Southern Miss Softball Complex; Hattiesburg, MS	**W** 7-2	**G. Fagan** (7-2)	M. Pierce (5-1)			1405	25-3	
March 13	Kentucky		Nusz Park	Cancelled							
March 14	Kentucky		Nusz Park	Cancelled							
March 15	Kentucky		Nusz Park	Cancelled							
March 18	at Samford		Samford Softball Field; Birmingham, AL	Cancelled							
March 21	at LSU		Tiger Park; Baton Rouge, LA	Cancelled							
March 22	at LSU		Tiger Park	Cancelled							
March 23	at LSU		Tiger Park	Cancelled							
March 27	at Auburn		Jane B. Moore Field; Auburn, AL	Cancelled							
March 28	at Auburn		Jane B. Moore Field	Cancelled							
March 29	at Auburn		Jane B. Moore Field	Cancelled							

April
Date	Opponent	Rank	Site/stadium	Score	Win	Loss	Save	TV	Attendance	Overall record	SEC record
April 3	Alabama		Nusz Park	Cancelled							
April 4	Alabama		Nusz Park	Cancelled							
April 5	Alabama		Nusz Park	Cancelled							
April 9	Arkansas		Nusz Park	Cancelled							
April 10	Arkansas		Nusz Park	Cancelled							
April 11	Arkansas		Nusz Park	Cancelled							
April 14	Southern Miss		Nusz Park	Cancelled							
April 17	at Georgia		Turner Softball Stadium; Athens, GA								
April 18	at Georgia		Turner Softball Stadium								
April 19	at Georgia		Turner Softball Stadium								
April 24	South Carolina		Nusz Park								
April 25	South Carolina		Nusz Park								
April 26	South Carolina		Nusz Park								

May
Date	Opponent	Rank	Site/stadium	Score	Win	Loss	Save	TV	Attendance	Overall record	SEC record
May 1	at Texas A&M		Davis Diamond; College Station, TX								
May 2	at Texas A&M		Davis Diamond								
May 3	at Texas A&M		Davis Diamond								

Postseason

SEC Tournament
Date	Opponent	Seed	Site/stadium	Score	Win	Loss	Save	TV	Attendance	Overall record	SECT Record
May 6–9			Rhoads Stadium; Tuscaloosa, AL								

Legend: = Win = Loss = Cancelled
Bold = Mississippi State team member

*Rankings are based on the team's current ranking in the NFCA poll.

== Rankings ==
Ranking movements Legend: ██ Increase in ranking ██ Decrease in ranking — = Not ranked RV = Received votes т = Tied with team above or below
	Week																
Poll	Pre	1	2	3	4	5	6	7	8	9	10	11	12	13	14	15	Final
NFCA / USA Today	—	RV	RV	RV	24	21											
Softball America	—	—	—	—	25	25											
ESPN.com/USA Softball	RV	RV	24	RV	22т	22											
D1Softball	—	—	—	—	—	—											
