= 2020 LSU Tigers softball team =

American college softball season

2020 LSU Tigers softball
- Conference: Southeastern Conference

Ranking
- Coaches: No. 7
- Record: 21–3 (0–0 SEC)
- Head coach: Beth Torina (9th season)
- Assistant coaches: Howard Dobson; Lindsay Leftwich
- Home stadium: Tiger Park

2020 Southeastern Conference softball standings
	Conf.				Overall
Team	W		L	PCT	W		L	PCT
No. 7 Florida ‍‍‍	3	–	0	1.000	23	–	4	.852
No. 23 Missouri ‍‍‍	3	–	0	1.000	19	–	7	.731
No. 11 Kentucky ‍‍‍	2	–	1	.667	20	–	4	.833
No. 14 Georgia ‍‍‍	2	–	1	.667	23	–	5	.821
No. 10 Alabama ‍‍‍	2	–	1	.667	14	–	8	.636
No. 20 Arkansas ‍‍‍	1	–	2	.333	19	–	6	.760
No. 16 South Carolina ‍‍‍	1	–	2	.333	17	–	6	.739
Texas A&M ‍‍‍	1	–	2	.333	17	–	9	.654
No. 21 Mississippi State ‍‍‍	0	–	0	–	25	–	3	.893
No. 5 LSU ‍‍‍	0	–	0	–	21	–	3	.875
Tennessee ‍‍‍	0	–	0	–	14	–	9	.609
Auburn ‍‍‍	0	–	3	.000	16	–	11	.593
Ole Miss ‍‍‍	0	–	3	.000	12	–	13	.480
† – Conference champion ‡ – Tournament champion y – Invited to the NCAA tournament As of March 13, 2020; Rankings from NFCA

The 2020 LSU Tigers softball team represented Louisiana State University in the 2020 NCAA Division I softball season. The Tigers played their home games at Tiger Park. The 2020 softball season was cut short due to the 2020 Covid-19 Pandemic. As a result, LSU had not played any conference games when the season ended on March 11, 2020. One notable highlight of the season was the program's first ever 7-inning perfect game thrown by Maribeth Gorsuch in a 4-0 victory over the Belmont Bruins on February 22, 2020.

== Previous season ==
The Tigers finished the 2019 season 43–19 overall, and 14–10 in the SEC to finish in a tie for second in the conference. The Tigers hosted a regional during the 2019 NCAA Division I softball tournament and later advanced to the Minneapolis Super Regional against Minnesota. The Tigers were defeated by the Golden Gophers 0 games to 2 as Minnesota advanced to the WCWS.

== Preseason ==
=== SEC preseason poll ===
The SEC preseason poll was released on January 15, 2020.

Media poll
Predicted finish	Team
1	Alabama
2	Tennessee
3	LSU
4	Kentucky
5	Florida
6	Georgia
7	Arkansas
8	Ole Miss
9	South Carolina
10	Missouri
11	Auburn
12	Mississippi State; Texas A&M

== Schedule and results ==
2020 LSU Tigers Softball Game Log
Regular season

February
Date	Opponent	Rank	Site/stadium	Score	Win	Loss	Save	TV	Attendance	Overall record	SEC record
February 6	Central Arkansas	No. 11	Tiger Park; Baton Rouge, LA	**W** 3–2	**S. Sunseri** (1–0)	R. Sanchez (0–1)	**A. Kilponen** (1)	SECN+	1,356	1–0	
February 7	No. 13 Oklahoma State	No. 11	Tiger Park	**W** 1–0	**S. Wickersham** (1–0)	C. Eberle (0–1)	**A. Kilponen** (2)	SECN+	1,536	2–0	
February 8	Florida A&M	No. 11	Tiger Park	**W** 8–0 (5)	**S. Sunseri** (2–0)	N. Zenteno (0–1)		SECN+	1,685	3–0	
February 8	No. 13 Oklahoma State	No. 11	Tiger Park	**W** 3–2	**M. Gorsuch** (1–0)	K. Maxwell (1–1)		SECN+	1,934	4–0	
February 9	Florida A&M	No. 11	Tiger Park	**W** 16–0 (5)	**A. Kilponen** (1–0)	B. Boatwright (0–2)		SECN+	1,361	5–0	
February 14	Samford	No. 7	Tiger Park	**W** 4–0	**A. Kilponen** (2–0)	T. DeCelles (1–1)		SECN+	1,356	6–0	
February 15	at No. 13 Louisiana	No. 7	Lamson Park; Lafayette, LA	L 1–2	M. Kleist (3–1)	**M. Gorsuch** (1–1)		ESPN+	3,107	6–1	
February 16	North Dakota	No. 7	Tiger Park	**W** 8–0 (5)	**S. Wickersham** (2–0)	J. Jones (1–3)		SECN+	1,398	7–1	
February 16	No. 13 Louisiana	No. 7	Tiger Park	**W** 4–3	**A. Kilponen** (3–0)	M. Kleist (3–2)		SECN+	2,246	8–1	
February 19	Louisiana Tech	No. 6	Tiger Park	**W** 9-2	**M. Gorsuch** (2-1)	B. Hernandez (2-2)		SECN+	1,297	9-1	
February 21	Belmont	No. 6	Tiger Park	**W** 4-0	**A. Kilponen (4-0)**	B. Lee (0-1)		-	1,295	10-1	
February 21	Sam Houston State	No. 6	Tiger Park	**W** 12-0 (5)	**S. Wickersham** (3-0)	K. Sanchez (0-2)		SECN+	1,295	11-1	
February 22	Sam Houston State	No. 6	Tiger Park	**W** 20-4 (5)	**Shelbi Sunseri** (3-0)	Darby Fitzpatrick (2-2)		SECN+	1,345	12-1	
February 22	Belmont	No. 6	Tiger Park	**W** 4-0	**Maribeth Gorsuch** (3-1)	Brittany Kennett (1-3)		SECN+	1,535	13-1	
February 27	vs. Loyola Marymount	No. 4	Anderson Family Field; Fullerton, CA	L 0-1	Linnay Wilson (4-3)	**Ali Kilponen** (4-1)		FLOSOFTBALL	235	13-2	
February 27	vs. No. 25 Texas Tech	No. 4	Anderson Family Field	**W** 6-5	**Shelbi Sunseri** (4-0)	GiGi Wall (1-2)		FLOSOFTBALL	435	14-2	
February 28	vs. California	No. 4	Anderson Family Field	**W** 5-1	**Shelbi Sunseri** (5-0)	Chloe Romero (4-4)		FLOSOFTBALL	201	15-2	
February 28	vs. No. 2 Washington	No. 4	Anderson Family Field	L 1-3	Pat Moore (6-0)	**Shelby Wickersham** (3-1)		FLOSOFTBALL	389	15-3	
February 29	vs. Colorado State	No. 4	Anderson Family Field	**W** 6-2	**Shelby Wickersham** (4-1)	Taylor Gilmore (3-3)		FLOSOFTBALL	376	16-3	

March
Date	Opponent	Rank	Site/stadium	Score	Win	Loss	Save	TV	Attendance	Overall record	SEC record
March 6	Campbell	No. 4	Tiger Park	**W** (21-0) (5)	**Shelbi Sunseri** (6-0)	Megan Richards		SECN+	1,349	17-3	
March 7	Campbell	No. 4	Tiger Park	**W** (5-1)	**Ali Kilponen** (5-1)	Georgeanna Barefoot (5-6)		SECN+	1,571	18-3	
March 7	Illinois State	No. 4	Tiger Park	**W** (5-1)	**Shelby Wickersham** (5-1)	Morgan Day		SECN+	1,693	19-3	
March 8	Illinois State	No. 4	Tiger Park	**W** (9-1)	**Maribeth Gorsuch** (4-1)	Amanda Fox (1-3)		SECN+	1,474	20-3	
March 10	South Alabama	No. 4	Tiger Park	**W** (11-1) (5)	**Ali Kilponen** (6-1)	Jenna Hardy		SECN+	1,362	21-3	
March 13	at South Carolina		Carolina Softball Stadium; Columbia, SC	Cancelled							
March 14	at South Carolina		Carolina Softball Stadium	Cancelled							
March 15	at South Carolina		Carolina Softball Stadium	Cancelled							
March 18	Northwestern State		Tiger Park	Cancelled							
March 21	Mississippi State		Tiger Park	Cancelled							
March 22	Mississippi State		Tiger Park	Cancelled							
March 23	Mississippi State		Tiger Park	Cancelled							
March 25	Southeastern Louisiana		Tiger Park	Cancelled							
March 27	Georgia		Tiger Park	Cancelled							
March 28	Georgia		Tiger Park	Cancelled							
March 29	Georgia		Tiger Park	Cancelled							

April
Date	Opponent	Rank	Site/stadium	Score	Win	Loss	Save	TV	Attendance	Overall record	SEC record
April 1	Louisiana–Monroe		Tiger Park	Cancelled							
April 3	at Ole Miss		Ole Miss Softball Complex; Oxford, MS	Cancelled							
April 4	at Ole Miss		Ole Miss Softball Complex	Cancelled							
April 5	at Ole Miss		Ole Miss Softball Complex	Cancelled							
April 7	Lamar		Tiger Park	Cancelled							
April 10	at Alabama		Rhoads Stadium; Tuscaloosa, AL	Cancelled							
April 10	at Alabama		Rhoads Stadium	Cancelled							
April 11	at Alabama		Rhoads Stadium	Cancelled							
April 17	Tennessee		Tiger Park	Cancelled							
April 18	Tennessee		Tiger Park	Cancelled							
April 19	Tennessee		Tiger Park	Cancelled							
April 21	Nicholls		Tiger Park	Cancelled							
April 24	Missouri		Tiger Park	Cancelled							
April 25	Missouri		Tiger Park	Cancelled							
April 26	Missouri		Tiger Park	Cancelled							
April 28	at McNeese State		Joe Miller Field; Lake Charles, LA	Cancelled							

May
Date	Opponent	Rank	Site/stadium	Score	Win	Loss	Save	TV	Attendance	Overall record	SEC record
May 1	at Auburn		Jane B. Moore Field; Auburn, AL	Cancelled							
May 2	at Auburn		Jane B. Moore Field	Cancelled							
May 3	at Auburn		Jane B. Moore Field	Cancelled							

Postseason

SEC Tournament
Date	Opponent	Seed	Site/stadium	Score	Win	Loss	Save	TV	Attendance	Overall record	SECT Record
May 6–9			Rhoads Stadium; Tuscaloosa, AL	Cancelled							

Legend: = Win = Loss = Cancelled
Bold = LSU team member

*Rankings are based on the team's current ranking in the NFCA poll.

== Rankings ==
Ranking movements Legend: ██ Increase in ranking ██ Decrease in ranking т = Tied with team above or below
	Week																
Poll	Pre	1	2	3	4	5	6	7	8	9	10	11	12	13	14	15	Final
NFCA / USA Today	11	7	6	4	5	5											
Softball America	13	7	8	6	7	6											
ESPN.com/USA Softball	11т	7	7	4	4	4т											
D1Softball	11	7	6	4	5	5											
