= 2020 Kentucky Wildcats softball team =

American college softball season

2020 Kentucky Wildcats softball
- Conference: Southeastern Conference

Ranking
- Coaches: No. 10
- Record: 4–0 (0–0 SEC)
- Head coach: Rachel Lawson (13th season)
- Assistant coaches: Kristine Himes; Molly Belcher
- Home stadium: John Cropp Stadium

2020 Southeastern Conference softball standings
| | Conf. | | | | Overall |
| Team | W | | L | PCT | W | | L | PCT |
|---|---|---|---|---|---|---|---|---|
| No. 7 Florida ‍‍‍ | 3 | – | 0 | 1.000 | 23 | – | 4 | .852 |
| No. 23 Missouri ‍‍‍ | 3 | – | 0 | 1.000 | 19 | – | 7 | .731 |
| No. 11 Kentucky ‍‍‍ | 2 | – | 1 | .667 | 20 | – | 4 | .833 |
| No. 14 Georgia ‍‍‍ | 2 | – | 1 | .667 | 23 | – | 5 | .821 |
| No. 10 Alabama ‍‍‍ | 2 | – | 1 | .667 | 14 | – | 8 | .636 |
| No. 20 Arkansas ‍‍‍ | 1 | – | 2 | .333 | 19 | – | 6 | .760 |
| No. 16 South Carolina ‍‍‍ | 1 | – | 2 | .333 | 17 | – | 6 | .739 |
| Texas A&M ‍‍‍ | 1 | – | 2 | .333 | 17 | – | 9 | .654 |
| No. 21 Mississippi State ‍‍‍ | 0 | – | 0 | – | 25 | – | 3 | .893 |
| No. 5 LSU ‍‍‍ | 0 | – | 0 | – | 21 | – | 3 | .875 |
| Tennessee ‍‍‍ | 0 | – | 0 | – | 14 | – | 9 | .609 |
| Auburn ‍‍‍ | 0 | – | 3 | .000 | 16 | – | 11 | .593 |
| Ole Miss ‍‍‍ | 0 | – | 3 | .000 | 12 | – | 13 | .480 |
† – Conference champion ‡ – Tournament champion y – Invited to the NCAA tournament As of March 13, 2020; Rankings from NFCA

The 2020 Kentucky Wildcats softball team represented the University of Kentucky in the 2020 NCAA Division I softball season. The Wildcats played their home games at John Cropp Stadium.

== Previous season ==
The Wildcats finished the 2019 season 36–24 overall, and 14–10 in the SEC to finish in a tie for second in the conference. The Wildcats hosted a regional during the 2019 NCAA Division I softball tournament and later advanced to the Seattle Super Regional against Washington. The Wildcats were defeated by the Huskies 0 games to 2 as the Huskies advanced to the WCWS.

== Preseason ==
=== SEC preseason poll ===
The SEC preseason poll was released on January 15, 2020.

Media poll
| Predicted finish | Team |
| 1 | Alabama |
| 2 | Tennessee |
| 3 | LSU |
| 4 | Kentucky |
| 5 | Florida |
| 6 | Georgia |
| 7 | Arkansas |
| 8 | Ole Miss |
| 9 | South Carolina |
| 10 | Missouri |
| 11 | Auburn |
| 12 | Mississippi State; Texas A&M |

== Schedule and results ==
2020 Kentucky Wildcats Softball Game Log
Regular season

February
| Date | Opponent | Rank | Site/stadium | Score | Win | Loss | Save | TV | Attendance | Overall record | SEC record |
|---|---|---|---|---|---|---|---|---|---|---|---|
| February 7 | vs. Liberty; NFCA D1 Leadoff Classic | No. 15 | Eddie C. Moore Complex; Clearwater, FL | **W** 6–2 | **M. Schorman** (1–0) | K. Keeney (0–1) | | | 200 | 1–0 | |
| February 7 | vs. Texas State; NFCA D1 Leadoff Classic | No. 15 | Eddie C. Moore Complex | **W** 2–1 | **G. Baalman** (1–0) | T. McCann (0–1) | | | 321 | 2–0 | |
| February 8 | vs. NC State; NFCA D1 Leadoff Classic | No. 15 | Eddie C. Moore Complex | **W** 6–2 (5) | **A. Humes** (1–0) | S. Nester (1–1) | | | 311 | 3–0 | |
| February 8 | vs. (United States) USA National Team; NFCA D1 Leadoff Classic | No. 15 | Eddie C. Moore Complex | **L** 0–7 | | | | | | Exh. | |
| February 9 | vs. No. 8 Minnesota; NFCA D1 Leadoff Classic | No. 15 | Eddie C. Moore Complex | **W** 7–0 | **M. Schorman** (2–0) | A. Fiser (2–2) | | | | 4–0 | |
| February 14 | vs. Boise State | No. 10 | Farrington Softball Stadium; Tempe, AZ | | | | | | | | |
| February 14 | at No. 23 Arizona State | No. 10 | Farrington Softball Stadium | | | | | | | | |
| February 15 | vs. Illinois State | No. 10 | Farrington Softball Stadium | | | | | | | | |
| February 15 | at No. 23 Arizona State | No. 10 | Farrington Softball Stadium | | | | | | | | |
| February 16 | vs. Detroit Mercy | No. 10 | Farrington Softball Stadium | | | | | | | | |
| February 19 | at Middle Tennessee | No. 13 | Blue Raider Softball Stadium; Murfreesboro, TN | | | | | | | | |
| February 21 | vs. Georgia Tech | No. 13 | Samford Softball Stadium; Birmingham, AL | | | | | | | | |
| February 21 | at Samford | No. 13 | Samford Softball Stadium | | | | | | | | |
| February 22 | vs. DePaul | No. 13 | Samford Softball Stadium | | | | | | | | |
| February 22 | vs. Georgia Tech | No. 13 | Samford Softball Stadium | | | | | | | | |
| February 23 | vs. DePaul | No. 13 | Samford Softball Stadium | | | | | | | | |
| February 27 | at UCF | No. 12 | UCF Softball Complex; Orlando, FL | | | | | | | | |
| February 28 | vs. Loyola–Chicago | No. 12 | Winter Springs, FL | | | | | | | | |
| February 28 | vs. FIU | No. 12 | Winter Springs, FL | | | | | | | | |
| February 29 | vs. Western Michigan | No. 12 | Winter Springs, FL | | | | | | | | |
| February 29 | vs. Detroit Mercy | No. 12 | Winter Springs, FL | | | | | | | | |

March
| Date | Opponent | Rank | Site/stadium | Score | Win | Loss | Save | TV | Attendance | Overall record | SEC record |
|---|---|---|---|---|---|---|---|---|---|---|---|
| March 1 | vs. Dartmouth | No. 12 | Winter Springs, FL | | | | | | | | |
| March 7 | Texas A&M | | John Cropp Stadium; Lexington, KY | | | | | | | | |
| March 8 | Texas A&M | | John Cropp Stadium | | | | | | | | |
| March 9 | Texas A&M | | John Cropp Stadium | | | | | | | | |
| March 11 | Marshall | | John Cropp Stadium | | | | | | | | |
| March 13 | at Mississippi State | | Nusz Park; Starkville, MS | | | | | | | | |
| March 14 | at Mississippi State | | Nusz Park | | | | | | | | |
| March 15 | at Mississippi State | | Nusz Park | | | | | | | | |
| March 17 | Northern Kentucky | | John Cropp Stadium | | | | | | | | |
| March 18 | at Miami (OH) | | Miami Softball Stadium; Oxford, OH | | | | | | | | |
| March 20 | Florida | | John Cropp Stadium | | | | | | | | |
| March 21 | Florida | | John Cropp Stadium | | | | | | | | |
| March 22 | Florida | | John Cropp Stadium | | | | | | | | |
| March 25 | at Western Kentucky | | WKU Softball Complex; Bowling Green, KY | | | | | | | | |
| March 27 | Tennessee | | John Cropp Stadium | | | | | | | | |
| March 28 | Tennessee | | John Cropp Stadium | | | | | | | | |
| March 29 | Tennessee | | John Cropp Stadium | | | | | | | | |
| March 31 | at Ohio State | | Buckeye Field; Columbus, OH | | | | | | | | |

April
| Date | Opponent | Rank | Site/stadium | Score | Win | Loss | Save | TV | Attendance | Overall record | SEC record |
|---|---|---|---|---|---|---|---|---|---|---|---|
| April 4 | at Georgia | | Turner Softball Stadium; Athens, GA | | | | | | | | |
| April 5 | at Georgia | | Turner Softball Stadium | | | | | | | | |
| April 6 | at Georgia | | Turner Softball Stadium | | | | | | | | |
| April 8 | Morehead State | | John Cropp Stadium | | | | | | | | |
| April 10 | at Oklahoma | | OU Softball Complex; Norman, OK | | | | | | | | |
| April 11 | at Oklahoma | | OU Softball Complex | | | | | | | | |
| April 17 | at Missouri | | Mizzou Softball Stadium; Columbia, MO | | | | | | | | |
| April 18 | at Missouri | | Mizzou Softball Stadium | | | | | | | | |
| April 19 | at Missouri | | Mizzou Softball Stadium | | | | | | | | |
| April 22 | at Eastern Kentucky | | Gertrude Hood Field; Richmond, KY | | | | | | | | |
| April 24 | Arkansas | | John Cropp Stadium | | | | | | | | |
| April 25 | Arkansas | | John Cropp Stadium | | | | | | | | |
| April 26 | Arkansas | | John Cropp Stadium | | | | | | | | |
| April 29 | Louisville | | John Cropp Stadium | | | | | | | | |

May
| Date | Opponent | Rank | Site/stadium | Score | Win | Loss | Save | TV | Attendance | Overall record | SEC record |
|---|---|---|---|---|---|---|---|---|---|---|---|
| May 1 | at Ole Miss | | Ole Miss Softball Complex; Oxford, MS | | | | | | | | |
| May 2 | at Ole Miss | | Ole Miss Softball Complex | | | | | | | | |
| May 3 | at Ole Miss | | Ole Miss Softball Complex | | | | | | | | |

Postseason

SEC Tournament
| Date | Opponent | Seed | Site/stadium | Score | Win | Loss | Save | TV | Attendance | Overall record | SECT Record |
|---|---|---|---|---|---|---|---|---|---|---|---|
| May 6–9 | | | Rhoads Stadium; Tuscaloosa, AL | | | | | | | | |

Legend: = Win = Loss = Cancelled
Bold = Kentucky team member

*Rankings are based on the team's current ranking in the NFCA poll.

== Rankings ==
Ranking movements Legend: ██ Increase in ranking ██ Decrease in ranking т = Tied with team above or below
| | Week | | | | | | | | | | | | | | | | |
| Poll | Pre | 1 | 2 | 3 | 4 | 5 | 6 | 7 | 8 | 9 | 10 | 11 | 12 | 13 | 14 | 15 | Final |
|---|---|---|---|---|---|---|---|---|---|---|---|---|---|---|---|---|---|
| NFCA / USA Today | 15 | 10 | 13 | 12 | 10 | 11 | | | | | | | | | | | |
| Softball America | 20 | 9 | 14 | 14 | 10 | 11 | | | | | | | | | | | |
| ESPN.com/USA Softball | 16 | 10 | 11 | 13 | 10 | 11т | | | | | | | | | | | |
| D1Softball | 17 | 10 | 13 | 14 | 13 | 13 | | | | | | | | | | | |
