= 2020 Auburn Tigers softball team =

American college softball season

2020 Auburn Tigers softball
- Conference: Southeastern Conference
- Record: 3–3 (0–0 SEC)
- Head coach: Mickey Dean (3rd season)
- Assistant coaches: Eugene Lenti; Ruby Rojas
- Home stadium: Jane B. Moore Field

2020 Southeastern Conference softball standings
	Conf.				Overall
Team	W		L	PCT	W		L	PCT
No. 7 Florida ‍‍‍	3	–	0	1.000	23	–	4	.852
No. 23 Missouri ‍‍‍	3	–	0	1.000	19	–	7	.731
No. 11 Kentucky ‍‍‍	2	–	1	.667	20	–	4	.833
No. 14 Georgia ‍‍‍	2	–	1	.667	23	–	5	.821
No. 10 Alabama ‍‍‍	2	–	1	.667	14	–	8	.636
No. 20 Arkansas ‍‍‍	1	–	2	.333	19	–	6	.760
No. 16 South Carolina ‍‍‍	1	–	2	.333	17	–	6	.739
Texas A&M ‍‍‍	1	–	2	.333	17	–	9	.654
No. 21 Mississippi State ‍‍‍	0	–	0	–	25	–	3	.893
No. 5 LSU ‍‍‍	0	–	0	–	21	–	3	.875
Tennessee ‍‍‍	0	–	0	–	14	–	9	.609
Auburn ‍‍‍	0	–	3	.000	16	–	11	.593
Ole Miss ‍‍‍	0	–	3	.000	12	–	13	.480
† – Conference champion ‡ – Tournament champion y – Invited to the NCAA tournament As of March 13, 2020; Rankings from NFCA

The 2020 Auburn Tigers softball team represented Auburn University in the 2020 NCAA Division I softball season. The Tigers played their home games at the Jane B. Moore Field.

== Previous season ==
The Tigers finished the 2019 season 39–21 overall, and 10–14 in the SEC to finish tenth in the conference. The Tigers went 2–2 in the Tucson Regional during the 2019 NCAA Division I softball tournament.

== Preseason ==
=== SEC preseason poll ===
The SEC preseason poll was released on January 15, 2020.

Media poll
Predicted finish	Team
1	Alabama
2	Tennessee
3	LSU
4	Kentucky
5	Florida
6	Georgia
7	Arkansas
8	Ole Miss
9	South Carolina
10	Missouri
11	Auburn
12	Mississippi State; Texas A&M

== Schedule and results ==
2020 Auburn Tigers Softball Game Log
Regular season

February
Date	Opponent	Rank	Site/stadium	Score	Win	Loss	Save	TV	Attendance	Overall record	SEC record
February 7	vs. Baylor; NFCA D1 Leadoff Classic	No. 23	Eddie C. Moore Complex; Clearwater, FL	**L** 0–8 (5)	G. Rodoni (1–0)	**A. Swindle** (0–1)				0–1	
February 7	vs. Notre Dame; NFCA D1 Leadoff Classic	No. 23	Eddie C. Moore Complex	**W** 4–1	**A. Swindle** (1–1)	A. Holloway (0–1)				1–1	
February 8	vs. Liberty; NFCA D1 Leadoff Classic	No. 23	Eddie C. Moore Complex	**W** 5–3	**A. Swindle** (2–1)	M. Johnson (0–2)			613	2–1	
February 8	vs. Texas State; NFCA D1 Leadoff Classic	No. 23	Eddie C. Moore Complex	**W** 3–1	**S. Yarbrough** (1–0)	M. King (1–1)			547	3–1	
February 9	vs. Illinois; NFCA D1 Leadoff Classic	No. 23	Eddie C. Moore Complex	**L** 0–2	S. Sickels (2–0)	**A. Swindle** (2–2)			429	3–2	
February 13	Kennesaw State		Jane B. Moore Field; Auburn, AL	**L** 1–4	M. Bennett (2–0)	**A. Swindle** (2–3)			1,415	3–3	
February 14	UNC Wilmington		Jane B. Moore Field								
February 14	Alabama State		Jane B. Moore Field								
February 15	Alabama State		Jane B. Moore Field								
February 15	UNC Wilmington		Jane B. Moore Field								
February 16	UNC Wilmington		Jane B. Moore Field								
February 20	vs. No. 16 Arizona State; Mary Nutter Classic		Big League Dreams; Cathedral City, CA								
February 21	vs. No. 25 Northwestern; Mary Nutter Classic		Big League Dreams								
February 21	vs. California; Mary Nutter Classic		Big League Dreams								
February 22	vs. No. 5 Arizona; Mary Nutter Classic		Big League Dreams								
February 23	vs. No. 1 UCLA; Mary Nutter Classic		Big League Dreams								
February 28	Georgia Southern		Jane B. Moore Field								
February 28	No. 18 Minnesota		Jane B. Moore Field								
February 29	No. 18 Minnesota		Jane B. Moore Field								
February 29	Binghamton		Jane B. Moore Field								

March
Date	Opponent	Rank	Site/stadium	Score	Win	Loss	Save	TV	Attendance	Overall record	SEC record
March 1	Binghamton		Jane B. Moore Field								
March 1	Georgia Southern		Jane B. Moore Field								
March 4	at Mercer		Sikes Field; Macon, GA								
March 4	at Mercer		Sikes Field								
March 6	at Florida		Katie Seashole Pressly Softball Stadium; Gainesville, FL								
March 7	at Florida		Katie Seashole Pressly Softball Stadium								
March 8	at Florida		Katie Seashole Pressly Softball Stadium								
March 10	at Jacksonville		Debbie & Fred Pruitt Softball Complex; Jacksonville, FL								
March 11	Georgia State		Jane B. Moore Field								
March 14	Missouri		Jane B. Moore Field								
March 15	Missouri		Jane B. Moore Field								
March 16	Missouri		Jane B. Moore Field								
March 20	at Georgia		Turner Softball Stadium; Athens, GA								
March 21	at Georgia		Turner Softball Stadium								
March 22	at Georgia		Turner Softball Stadium								
March 27	Mississippi State		Jane B. Moore Field								
March 28	Mississippi State		Jane B. Moore Field								
March 29	Mississippi State		Jane B. Moore Field								

April
Date	Opponent	Rank	Site/stadium	Score	Win	Loss	Save	TV	Attendance	Overall record	SEC record
April 1	(United States) USA National Team		Jane B. Moore Field								
April 3	at South Carolina		Carolina Softball Stadium; Columbia, SC								
April 4	at South Carolina		Carolina Softball Stadium								
April 5	at South Carolina		Carolina Softball Stadium								
April 7	Alabama State		Jane B. Moore Field								
April 9	Ole Miss		Jane B. Moore Field								
April 10	Ole Miss		Jane B. Moore Field								
April 11	Ole Miss		Jane B. Moore Field								
April 15	Chattanooga		Jane B. Moore Field								
April 18	Charlotte		Jane B. Moore Field								
April 19	Charlotte		Jane B. Moore Field								
April 22	at Troy		Troy Softball Complex; Troy, AL								
April 25	at Alabama		Rhoads Stadium; Tuscaloosa, AL								
April 26	at Alabama		Rhoads Stadium								
April 27	at Alabama		Rhoads Stadium								

May
Date	Opponent	Rank	Site/stadium	Score	Win	Loss	Save	TV	Attendance	Overall record	SEC record
May 1	LSU		Jane B. Moore Field								
May 2	LSU		Jane B. Moore Field								
May 3	LSU		Jane B. Moore Field								

Postseason

SEC Tournament
Date	Opponent	Seed	Site/stadium	Score	Win	Loss	Save	TV	Attendance	Overall record	SECT Record
May 6–9			Rhoads Stadium; Tuscaloosa, AL								

Legend: = Win = Loss = Cancelled
Bold = Auburn team member

*Rankings are based on the team's current ranking in the NFCA poll.

== Rankings ==
Ranking movements Legend: ██ Increase in ranking ██ Decrease in ranking — = Not ranked RV = Received votes
	Week																
Poll	Pre	1	2	3	4	5	6	7	8	9	10	11	12	13	14	15	Final
NFCA / USA Today	23	RV	RV	—	—	—											
Softball America	23	—	—	—	—	—											
ESPN.com/USA Softball	RV	RV	RV	—	RV	—											
D1Softball	22	—	—	—	—	—											
