= 2020 Arkansas Razorbacks softball team =

American college softball season

2020 Arkansas Razorbacks softball
- Conference: Southeastern Conference

Ranking
- Coaches: No. 20
- Record: 19–6 (1–2 SEC)
- Head coach: Courtney Deifel (5th season)
- Assistant coaches: Matt Meuchel; Yolanda McRae
- Home stadium: Bogle Park

2020 Southeastern Conference softball standings
	Conf.				Overall
Team	W		L	PCT	W		L	PCT
No. 7 Florida ‍‍‍	3	–	0	1.000	23	–	4	.852
No. 23 Missouri ‍‍‍	3	–	0	1.000	19	–	7	.731
No. 11 Kentucky ‍‍‍	2	–	1	.667	20	–	4	.833
No. 14 Georgia ‍‍‍	2	–	1	.667	23	–	5	.821
No. 10 Alabama ‍‍‍	2	–	1	.667	14	–	8	.636
No. 20 Arkansas ‍‍‍	1	–	2	.333	19	–	6	.760
No. 16 South Carolina ‍‍‍	1	–	2	.333	17	–	6	.739
Texas A&M ‍‍‍	1	–	2	.333	17	–	9	.654
No. 21 Mississippi State ‍‍‍	0	–	0	–	25	–	3	.893
No. 5 LSU ‍‍‍	0	–	0	–	21	–	3	.875
Tennessee ‍‍‍	0	–	0	–	14	–	9	.609
Auburn ‍‍‍	0	–	3	.000	16	–	11	.593
Ole Miss ‍‍‍	0	–	3	.000	12	–	13	.480
† – Conference champion ‡ – Tournament champion y – Invited to the NCAA tournament As of March 13, 2020; Rankings from NFCA

The 2020 Arkansas Razorbacks softball team represented the University of Arkansas in the 2020 NCAA Division I softball season. The Razorbacks played their home games at Bogle Park.

== Previous season ==
The Razorbacks finished the 2019 season 38–20 overall, and 12–12 in the SEC to finish in a tie for sixth in the conference. The Razorbacks went 0–2 in the Stillwater Regional during the 2019 NCAA Division I softball tournament.

== Preseason ==
=== SEC preseason poll ===
The SEC preseason poll was released on January 15, 2020.

Media poll
Predicted finish	Team
1	Alabama
2	Tennessee
3	LSU
4	Kentucky
5	Florida
6	Georgia
7	Arkansas
8	Ole Miss
9	South Carolina
10	Missouri
11	Auburn
12	Mississippi State; Texas A&M

== Schedule and results ==
2020 Arkansas Razorbacks Softball Game Log
Regular season

February
Date	Opponent	Rank	Site/stadium	Score	Win	Loss	Save	TV	Attn.	Overall	SEC
Troy Cox Classic
February 7	vs. UTEP	No. 24	NM State Softball Complex; Las Cruces, NM	**W** 10–0 (5)	**A. Storms** (1–0)	A. Johnson (0–1)			334	1–0	
February 7	vs. Bradley	No. 24	NM State Softball Complex	**L** 3–4	E. Jackson (1–0)	**M. Haff** (0–1)			353	1–1	
February 8	vs. Bradley	No. 24	NM State Softball Complex	**W** 12–1 (5)	**A. Storms** (2–0)	M. Radford (0–2)			404	2–1	
February 8	at New Mexico State	No. 24	NM State Softball Complex	**W** 5–4	**A. Storms** (3–0)	M. Faapito (0–1)			994	3–1	
February 9	vs. Nebraska	No. 24	NM State Softball Complex	**W** 15–4 (5)	**M. Haff** (1–1)	L. Walljasper (1–2)			301	4–1	
FGCU Invitational
February 14	vs. Memphis	No. 24	FGCU Softball Complex; Fort Myers, FL	Cancelled							
February 14	at Florida Gulf Coast	No. 24	FGCU Softball Complex	Cancelled							
February 15	vs. Furman	No. 24	FGCU Softball Complex	**W** 8–1	**J. Bloom** (1–0)	M. Smith (1–3)	**M. Haff** (1)			5–1	
February 15	vs. UIC	No. 24	FGCU Softball Complex	**W** 8–3	**M. Haff** (2–1)	A. Trudeau (1–1)				6–1	
February 16	at Florida Gulf Coast	No. 24	FGCU Softball Complex	**W** 4–1	**A. Storms** (4–0)	S. Lawton (4–1)	**J. Bloom** (1)	YouTube	183	7–1	
Razorback Invitational
February 20	Boston University	No. 23	Bogle Park; Fayetteville, AR	**W** 4–1	**M. Haff** (3–1)	A. DuBois (6–2)	**J. Bloom** (2)		402	8–1	
February 21	South Dakota State	No. 23	Bogle Park	**W** 13–3 (5)	**A. Storms** (5–0)	K. Conard (1–3)			494	9–1	
February 21	Marist	No. 23	Bogle Park	**W** 7–0	**M. Haff** (4–1)	C. Phippen (0–2)	**J. Bloom** (3)		456	10–1	
February 22	Boston University	No. 23	Bogle Park	**W** 10–2 (6)	**A. Storms** (6–0)	A. DuBois (7–4)			709	11–1	
February 22	Montana	No. 23	Bogle Park	**L** 0–5	M. Hood (1–4)	**J. Bloom** (1–1)			678	11–2	
February 23	Marist	No. 23	Bogle Park	**W** 5–1	**A. Storms** (7–0)	K. Myers (1–2)			482	12–2	
Woo Pig Classic
February 27	No. 23 Baylor	No. 22	Bogle Park	**L** 2–3	A. Pritchett (5–0)	**A. Storms** (7–1)			594	12–3	
February 28	Villanova	No. 22	Bogle Park	**W** 11–1 (5)	**A. Storms** (8–1)	S. Kennedy (0–4)			535	13–3	
February 28	Kent State	No. 22	Bogle Park	**W** 9–5	**J. Bloom** (2–1)	M. Huck (3–1)			618	14–3	
February 29	No. 9 Florida State	No. 22	Bogle Park	**L** 1–2	C. Arnold (3–2)	**A. Storms** (8–2)	K. Sandercock (1)		1,997	14–4	
February 29	Villanova	No. 22	Bogle Park	**W** 12–4 (5)	**J. Bloom** (3–1)	P. Rauch (9–3)			722	15–4	

March
Date	Opponent	Rank	Site/stadium	Score	Win	Loss	Save	TV	Attn.	Overall	SEC
Woo Pig Classic
March 1	Kent State	No. 22	Bogle Park	**W** 8–0 (5)	**A. Storms** (9–2)	A. Scali (3–6)			698	16–4	
March 6	at No. 9 Alabama	No. 20	Rhoads Stadium; Tuscaloosa, AL	**W** 1–0	**A. Storms** (10–2)	M. Fouts (3–3)			3,236	17–4	1–0
March 7	at No. 9 Alabama	No. 20	Rhoads Stadium	**L** 2–10 (6)	L. Kilfoyl (5–4)	**J. Bloom** (3–2)			3,626	17–5	1–1
March 8	at No. 9 Alabama	No. 20	Rhoads Stadium	**L** 1–9 (6)	L. Kilfoyl (6–4)	**A. Storms** (10–3)			3,474	17–6	1–2
March 10	Kansas	No. 20	Bogle Park	**W** 3–2	**A. Storms** (11–3)	H. Reed (4–5)			485	18–6	
March 10	Kansas	No. 20	Bogle Park	**W** 1–0	**J. Bloom** (4–2)	L. Mills (3–3)			563	19–6	
March 13	Georgia		Bogle Park	The remainder of the season was cancelled due to the COVID-19 pandemic.							
March 14	Georgia		Bogle Park	The remainder of the season was cancelled due to the COVID-19 pandemic.							
March 15	Georgia		Bogle Park	The remainder of the season was cancelled due to the COVID-19 pandemic.							
March 17	Missouri State		Bogle Park	The remainder of the season was cancelled due to the COVID-19 pandemic.							
March 20	at Missouri		Mizzou Softball Stadium; Columbia, MO	The remainder of the season was cancelled due to the COVID-19 pandemic.							
March 21	at Missouri		Mizzou Softball Stadium	The remainder of the season was cancelled due to the COVID-19 pandemic.							
March 22	at Missouri		Mizzou Softball Stadium	The remainder of the season was cancelled due to the COVID-19 pandemic.							
March 24	at Wichita State		Wilkins Stadium; Wichita, KS	The remainder of the season was cancelled due to the COVID-19 pandemic.							
March 27	North Texas		Bogle Park	The remainder of the season was cancelled due to the COVID-19 pandemic.							
March 27	North Texas		Bogle Park	The remainder of the season was cancelled due to the COVID-19 pandemic.							
March 28	North Texas		Bogle Park	The remainder of the season was cancelled due to the COVID-19 pandemic.							
March 31	Kansas City		Bogle Park	The remainder of the season was cancelled due to the COVID-19 pandemic.							

April
Date	Opponent	Rank	Site/stadium	Score	Win	Loss	Save	TV	Attn.	Overall	SEC
April 1	Tulsa		Bogle Park	The remainder of the season was cancelled due to the COVID-19 pandemic.							
April 3	Texas A&M		Bogle Park	The remainder of the season was cancelled due to the COVID-19 pandemic.							
April 4	Texas A&M		Bogle Park	The remainder of the season was cancelled due to the COVID-19 pandemic.							
April 5	Texas A&M		Bogle Park	The remainder of the season was cancelled due to the COVID-19 pandemic.							
April 9	at Mississippi State		Nusz Park; Starkville, MS	The remainder of the season was cancelled due to the COVID-19 pandemic.							
April 10	at Mississippi State		Nusz Park	The remainder of the season was cancelled due to the COVID-19 pandemic.							
April 11	at Mississippi State		Nusz Park	The remainder of the season was cancelled due to the COVID-19 pandemic.							
April 18	Florida		Bogle Park	The remainder of the season was cancelled due to the COVID-19 pandemic.							
April 19	Florida		Bogle Park	The remainder of the season was cancelled due to the COVID-19 pandemic.							
April 20	Florida		Bogle Park	The remainder of the season was cancelled due to the COVID-19 pandemic.							
April 24	at Kentucky		John Cropp Stadium; Lexington, KY	The remainder of the season was cancelled due to the COVID-19 pandemic.							
April 25	at Kentucky		John Cropp Stadium	The remainder of the season was cancelled due to the COVID-19 pandemic.							
April 26	at Kentucky		John Cropp Stadium	The remainder of the season was cancelled due to the COVID-19 pandemic.							

May
Date	Opponent	Rank	Site/stadium	Score	Win	Loss	Save	TV	Attn.	Overall	SEC
May 1	Tennessee		Bogle Park	The remainder of the season was cancelled due to the COVID-19 pandemic.							
May 2	Tennessee		Bogle Park	The remainder of the season was cancelled due to the COVID-19 pandemic.							
May 3	Tennessee		Bogle Park	The remainder of the season was cancelled due to the COVID-19 pandemic.							

Postseason

SEC Tournament
Date	Opponent	Seed	Site/stadium	Score	Win	Loss	Save	TV	Attendance	Overall record	SECT Record
May 6–9			Rhoads Stadium; Tuscaloosa, AL	The remainder of the season was cancelled due to the COVID-19 pandemic.							

Legend: = Win = Loss = Cancelled
Bold = Arkansas team member

*Rankings are based on the team's current ranking in the NFCA poll.

== February ==
=== Troy Cox Classic ===
Troy Cox Classic
UTEP	0	24 Arkansas	10
Bradley	4	24 Arkansas	3
Bradley	1	24 Arkansas	12
24 Arkansas	5	New Mexico State	4
24 Arkansas	15	Nebraska	4
NM State Softball Complex • Las Cruces, NM

The Razorbacks opened their 2020 season with a road trip to Las Cruces, New Mexico for the 2020 playing of the Troy Cox Classic, hosted by the New Mexico State Aggies, which started Friday, February 7. Arkansas received preseason rankings of #17 by Softball America and Flo Softball, #20 by USA Softball, #21 by D1 Softball, and #24 by NFCA. First pitch on opening day was at 9:30 a.m. CST (8:30 a.m. local MST) against the UTEP Miners. The Razorbacks won their first game of the year in run rule fashion, defeating the Miners in five innings. Arkansas' Autumn Storms spent four innings on the mound, tossing 52 pitches, while Jenna Bloom threw 20 pitches to get the final three outs. For the Miners, Allie Johnson spent the entire contest in the circle, throwing 183 pitches. The Lady Hogs put up one run apiece in the first and second innings before scoring three in the third to extend the lead to 5–0. Another two runs scored in the fourth before freshman Rylin Hedgecock, pinch hitting, ended the contest with a run rule three-run home run, the game's only homer.

The Razorbacks continued their tournament schedule with a doubleheader against the Bradley Braves, with the first game starting on Friday at 2:00 p.m. and the second on Saturday at 11:00 a.m. Friday's contest saw the Hogs suffer their first defeat of the season, by a margin of a single run. The Hogs opened the scoring in the first inning off of a Hannah McEwen RBI, and the score remained 1–0 until the bottom of the fourth, when a defensive error cost the Hogs two runs and the lead. The Braves extended their lead in the next inning by virtue of a wild pitch, making the score 3–1. Although the Razorbacks attempted to mount a comeback in the seventh and final inning, it fell barely short, and the Braves picked up the victory, 3–2. Both teams utilized only one pitcher for the entire game—Arkansas stuck with Mary Haff, who threw 72 pitches, while Bradley stayed with Emma Jackson, who tossed 131.

The rematch with Bradley opened the Hogs' second day of tournament play, and they took full advantage of it. Arkansas jumped out to a 4–0 lead in the first inning, via a Kayla Green RBI and a Linnie Malkin three-run homer. The lead was extended to 8–0 with four more runs in the third inning by way of a bases loaded hit by pitch and a three-run RBI double from Sydney Parr. A couple wild throws allowed the Braves to plate a run in the top of the fourth in unearned fashion, though the Razorbacks responded with another four-run inning, extending the lead to 12–1. A scoreless fifth inning from the Braves' offense triggered the end of the game, giving the Lady Hogs their second win of the year, both in run rule fashion. Autumn Storms picked up her second decision of the year after throwing 43 pitches over three innings; she was assisted by Jenna Bloom, who completed two innings in just 32 pitches. For the Braves, Morgan Radford tossed 71 in the first three innings; she was relieved by Grace French, who completed the fourth and final inning in 35 pitches.

The Hogs' fourth tournament game was against the hosts, New Mexico State; first pitch was on Saturday at 4:30 p.m. Arkansas fell behind early, surrendering three runs in the second inning, all by way of solo homers. Arkansas responded in the fifth, as Braxton Burnside sent a single to center field that drove home a run. In the sixth, the Hogs plated another, this one from Audrie LaValley's infield single. Arkansas kept it up in the seventh, as they took their first lead of the contest, 4–3, from Danielle Gibson's two-run homer, which was immediately followed by Linnie Malkin's solo home, her second of the day. In the circle, Autumn Storms earned her third win of the year, throwing 39 pitches in 2 2/3 innings. The Hogs also saw 1 inning completed by Mary Haff (18 pitches) and 3 1/3 by Jenna Bloom (49 pitches). The Aggies relied largely on Matalasi Faapito, who delivered 94 pitches in her six innings of play. She was relieved during the seventh inning by Chloe Rivas, who delivered the last three outs in 20 pitches.

The Hogs' fifth and final tournament game was against Nebraska; first pitch was on Sunday at 9:00 a.m. The Razorbacks' offense got off to their best start yet to close out the Troy Cox Classic, as they plated five runs (including a two RBIs driven home by Linnie Malkin and a Ryan Jackson home run) in the first inning alone. This was followed by a seven-run second inning that saw Danielle Gibson tally one RBI and Ryan Jackson drive home two more before Audrie LaValley recorded the Lady Hogs' first grand slam of the year to make it 12–0. Nebraska's offense responded in the bottom of the third with a pair of home runs to narrow the lead to nine. Arkansas would not be fazed; Braxton Burnside stepped up in the fourth and drilled a three-run home run to increase the lead to 15–3. Nebraska tallied a solo home run in the fifth, but was unable to do anything more and the Hogs won their third run rule contest by a margin of 15–4. Mary Haff tallied her first win of the year, having thrown 25 pitches in 1 2/3 innings. She was assisted in the circle by Jenna Bloom, who tossed 45 in 2 1/3 innings, and Rylin Hedgecock, who threw 18 in one inning of play. For the Cornhuskers, Lindsey Walljasper received the decision after throwing 75 pitches in 1 2/3 innings. The other 3 1/3 were played by Courtney Wallace, who threw 82 pitches in total.

=== FGCU Invitational ===
FGCU Invitational
Memphis	–	Arkansas	–
Arkansas	–	FGCU	–
Furman		Arkansas	
UIC		Arkansas	
Arkansas		FGCU	
FGCU Softball Complex • Fort Myers, FL

Just five days after concluding play in New Mexico, the Hogs were set to begin another five-game tournament slate, this time in Fort Myers, Florida at the FGCU Invitational, hosted by the Florida Gulf Coast Eagles. Arkansas was scheduled to open with a 2:30 p.m. contest against Memphis on Friday, February 14. Later that day, the Razorbacks were set to take the diamond again to face the tournament's hosts, the FGCU Eagles, at 7:00 p.m. However, earlier that day, it was announced that these games had been cancelled and would not be made up.

The Hogs have two games slated for Saturday: at 10:00 a.m., Arkansas will take on the Furman Paladins, followed by a 2:30 p.m. matchup with the UIC Flames.

To conclude the tournament, Arkansas will again face FGCU; first pitch is scheduled for 12:30 p.m. on Sunday.

=== Razorback Invitational ===
Razorback Invitational
Boston University	Arkansas
South Dakota State	Arkansas
Marist	Arkansas
Boston University	Arkansas
Montana	Arkansas
Marist	Arkansas
Bogle Park • Fayetteville, AR

The Razorbacks will open at home on Thursday, February 20, with the first match of the Razorback Invitational against the Boston University Terriers. First pitch will be at Bogle Park in Fayetteville at 4:30 p.m.

Day 2 of the tournament will see the Hogs take on South Dakota State at 2:30 p.m. and Marist at 4:45 p.m.

Saturday's slate includes two more matchups for the Lady Razorbacks - they will face Boston University again at 12:15 p.m., and will take on Montana afterwards at 2:30 p.m.

Arkansas will wrap up the Razorback invitational with a second game against Marist; this one on Sunday, February 23 at 11:45 a.m.

=== Woo Pig Classic ===
Woo Pig Classic
Baylor	Arkansas
Villanova	Arkansas
Kent State	Arkansas
Florida State	Arkansas
Villanova	Arkansas
Kent State	Arkansas
Bogle Park • Fayetteville, AR

Just four days after concluding play at their first tournament, the Lady Razorbacks will be back out on the diamond to open their second tournament of the month, starting a slate of six games at the Woo Pig Classic. The opening game will begin at 4:30 p.m. on Thursday, February 27 against the Baylor Lady Bears.

As with the Razorback Invitational, the Woo Pig Classic will feature an Arkansas doubleheader on Friday: the Hogs play Villanova at 4:45 p.m. and Kent State to finish the night at 7:00 p.m.

Saturday will see two more matchups for the Lady Razorbacks. At 4:45 p.m., Arkansas will play host to Florida State, and a 7:00 p.m. rematch with Villanova will follow.

Arkansas will conclude their fourth and final tournament of the month on Sunday, March 1, when they take on Kent State at 12:15 p.m.

== Rankings ==
Ranking movements Legend: ██ Increase in ranking ██ Decrease in ranking
	Week																
Poll	Pre	1	2	3	4	5	6	7	8	9	10	11	12	13	14	15	Final
NFCA / USA Today	24	24	23	22	20	20											
Softball America	17	22	21	23	20	20											
ESPN.com/USA Softball	20	24	23	21	20	20											
D1Softball	21	23	24	23	22	23											
