= 2020 Ole Miss Rebels softball team =

American college softball season

2020 Ole Miss Rebels softball
- Conference: Southeastern Conference
- Record: 12–13 (0–3 SEC)
- Head coach: Ruben Felix (1st as HC; 6th overall season)
- Assistant coaches: Damon Haecker; Kim Schuette
- Home stadium: Ole Miss Softball Complex

2020 Southeastern Conference softball standings
	Conf.				Overall
Team	W		L	PCT	W		L	PCT
No. 7 Florida ‍‍‍	3	–	0	1.000	23	–	4	.852
No. 23 Missouri ‍‍‍	3	–	0	1.000	19	–	7	.731
No. 11 Kentucky ‍‍‍	2	–	1	.667	20	–	4	.833
No. 14 Georgia ‍‍‍	2	–	1	.667	23	–	5	.821
No. 10 Alabama ‍‍‍	2	–	1	.667	14	–	8	.636
No. 20 Arkansas ‍‍‍	1	–	2	.333	19	–	6	.760
No. 16 South Carolina ‍‍‍	1	–	2	.333	17	–	6	.739
Texas A&M ‍‍‍	1	–	2	.333	17	–	9	.654
No. 21 Mississippi State ‍‍‍	0	–	0	–	25	–	3	.893
No. 5 LSU ‍‍‍	0	–	0	–	21	–	3	.875
Tennessee ‍‍‍	0	–	0	–	14	–	9	.609
Auburn ‍‍‍	0	–	3	.000	16	–	11	.593
Ole Miss ‍‍‍	0	–	3	.000	12	–	13	.480
† – Conference champion ‡ – Tournament champion y – Invited to the NCAA tournament As of March 13, 2020; Rankings from NFCA

The 2020 Ole Miss Rebels softball team represented the University of Mississippi in the 2020 NCAA Division I softball season. The Rebels played their home games at the Ole Miss Softball Complex.

== Previous season ==
The Rebels finished the 2019 season 41–20 overall, and 13–10 in the SEC to finish fifth in the conference. The Rebels hosted a regional during the 2019 NCAA Division I softball tournament and later advanced to the Tucson Super Regional against Arizona. The Rebels were defeated by the Wildcats 0 games to 2 as Arizona advanced to the WCWS.

== Preseason ==
=== SEC preseason poll ===
The SEC preseason poll was released on January 15, 2020.

Media poll
Predicted finish	Team
1	Alabama
2	Tennessee
3	LSU
4	Kentucky
5	Florida
6	Georgia
7	Arkansas
8	Ole Miss
9	South Carolina
10	Missouri
11	Auburn
12	Mississippi State; Texas A&M

== Roster ==
2020 Ole Miss Rebels softball team
Players
Coaches

#	Pos.	Name	Bats/throws	Height	Year	High school/junior college	Home town
4	RHP	Taylor Bachmeyer	R/R	5 ft 6 in (1.68 m)	Fr	Hendrickson	Pflugerville, TX
5	RHP	Ava Tillmann	R/R	5 ft 10 in (1.78 m)	Jr	Cedartown	Cedartown, GA
6	INF	Mikayla Allee	R/R	5 ft 4 in (1.63 m)	So	Norco	Corona, CA
7	LHP	Molly Jacobsen	L/L	5 ft 8 in (1.73 m)	Sr	Adel–De Soto–Minburn; Des Moines Area CC	Adel, IA
8	OF	Raegan Cheyne	L/R	5 ft 8 in (1.73 m)	Fr	Norco	Norco, CA
9	INF	Paige Smith	R/R	5 ft 5 in (1.65 m)	Fr	Norco	Corona, CA
10	OF	Katelin Cooper	L/R	5 ft 5 in (1.65 m)	So	Cedar Creek	Choudrant, LA
11	OF	Tate Whitley	L/L	5 ft 3 in (1.6 m)	So	Angleton	Angleton, TX
12	U	Kinsey Kuhlmann	R/R	5 ft 7 in (1.7 m)	Fr	Liberty Hill	Liberty Hill, TX
13	RHP	Savannah Diederich	R/R	5 ft 11 in (1.8 m)	So	Los Altos	Hacienda Heights, CA
14	U	Taylor Watford	R/R	5 ft 5 in (1.65 m)	So	Hartsville	Lamar, SC
16	U	Sydney Gutierrez	L/L	5 ft 9 in (1.75 m)	Jr	Pearland; Blinn College	Pearland, TX
17	INF	Kacey Hvitved	R/R	5 ft 5 in (1.65 m)	Jr	Monroe; Shoreline CC	Snohomish, WA
19	RHP	Lindsey Johnson	R/R	5 ft 8 in (1.73 m)	Jr	Macon East; William Carey	Wetumpka, AL
20	U	Jessica Puk	R/R	5 ft 10 in (1.78 m)	Jr	Agoura (CA)	Cedar Rapids, IA
21	INF	Amanda Roth	R/R	5 ft 7 in (1.7 m)	Jr	Hebron	Carrollton, TX
22	LHP	Anna Borgen	L/L	5 ft 9 in (1.75 m)	Jr	Dallas Christian	Heath, TX
23	U	Ally Mena	R/R	5 ft 7 in (1.7 m)	Jr	Westminster Christian	Miami, FL
24	C	Autumn Gillespie	R/R	6 ft 1 in (1.85 m)	Sr	Redlands East Valley; UCF	Redlands, CA
30	INF	Abbey Latham	R/R	5 ft 11 in (1.8 m)	Jr	Demopolis	Livingston, AL
31	INF	Mac Barbara	L/R	5 ft 9 in (1.75 m)	Fr	St. Joseph	Long Beach, CA
32	OF	Kelsha Loftin	R/R	5 ft 7 in (1.7 m)	Sr	Mendenhall; Jones County JC	Mendenhall, MS
34	OF	Nyomi Jones	L/R	5 ft 7 in (1.7 m)	Fr	Mater Dei	Long Beach, CA
36	INF	Gabby Alvarez	R/R	5 ft 9 in (1.75 m)	Jr	Martin Luther King Jr.	Riverside, CA

Head coach

Ruben Felix (Texas Tech)

Assistant coach(es)

Damon Haecker (Auburn)
Kim Schuette (Indiana State)

Legend

- (C) Team captain
- (S) Suspended
- (I) Ineligible
- Injured
- Current redshirt

Roster

== Schedule and results ==
2020 Ole Miss Rebels Softball Game Log
Regular season

February
Date	Opponent	Rank	Site/stadium	Score	Win	Loss	Save	TV	Attendance	Overall record	SEC record
February 7	vs. Louisville; NFCA D1 Leadoff Classic	No. 21	Eddie C. Moore Complex; Clearwater, FL	**L** 2–4	Roby (1–0)	**Jacobsen (0–1)**	Harris (1)			0–1	
February 7	vs. NC State; NFCA D1 Leadoff Classic	No. 21	Eddie C. Moore Complex	**L** 2–3	Nester (1–0)	**Diederich (0–1)**				0–2	
February 8	vs. Illinois; NFCA D1 Leadoff Classic	No. 21	Eddie C. Moore Complex	**L** 1–3	Jarvis (1–0)	**Tillmann (0–1)**	Sickels (1)			0–3	
February 8	vs. Notre Dame; NFCA D1 Leadoff Classic	No. 21	Eddie C. Moore Complex	**L** 5–7	Holloway (2–1)	**Jacobsen (0–2)**				0–4	
February 9	vs. Liberty; NFCA D1 Leadoff Classic	No. 21	Eddie C. Moore Complex	**L** 2–4	Keeney (1–1)	**Diederich (0–2)**			202	0–5	
February 13	vs. Colorado State; Puerto Vallarta College Challenge		Nancy Almaraz Stadium; Puerto Vallarta, Mexico	**W** 2–0^{(8)}	**Jacobsen (1–2)**	Jarecki (1–1)			269	1–5	
February 13	vs. Utah; Puerto Vallarta College Challenge		Nancy Almaraz Stadium	**L** 4–5	Sandez (5–0)	**Diederich (0–3)**			231	1–6	
February 14	vs. California Baptist; Puerto Vallarta College Challenge		Nancy Almaraz Stadium	**L** 2–4	Lopez (1–1)	**Tillmann (0–2)**			212	1–7	
February 15	vs. Mexico National Team		Nancy Almaraz Stadium	**W** 4–1	**Borgen**	McQuillin			318	Exh.	
February 15	vs. No. 6 Texas; Puerto Vallarta College Challenge		Nancy Almaraz Stadium	**L** 1–4	Elish (4–0)	**Jacobsen (1–3)**			417	1–8	
February 19	Mississippi Valley State		Ole Miss Softball Complex; Oxford, MS	**W** 11–0^{(5)}	**Borgen (1–0)**	Silva (1–1)			103	2–8	
February 21	vs. No. 14 Oklahoma State		Mary Bowers Field; Birmingham, AL	**W** 8–5	**Jacobsen (2–3)**	Simunek (1–1)	**Tillmann (1)**		147	3–8	
February 21	at UAB		Mary Bowers Field	**W** 5–0	**Borgen (2–0)**	Woodham (3–2)			127	4–8	
February 22	vs. No. 11 Louisiana		Mary Bowers Field	**L** 3–5	Kleist (4–3)	**Jacobsen (2–4)**	Ellyson (1)		194	4–9	
February 22	at UAB		Mary Bowers Field	**W** 14–11^{(13)}	**Tillmann (1–2)**	Cespedes (1–3)	**Jacobsen (1)**		362	5–9	
February 23	vs. No. 11 Louisiana		Mary Bowers Field	**L** 1–8	Ellyson (6–0)	**Borgen (2–1)**			308	5–10	
February 25	North Alabama		Ole Miss Softball Complex	**W** 6–2	**Jacobsen (3–4)**	Garst (3–3)			89	6–10	
February 28	Jackson State		Ole Miss Softball Complex	**W** 8–0^{(5)}	**Tillmann (2–2)**	Jones (1–3)			183	7–10	
February 28	California Baptist		Ole Miss Softball Complex	**W** 8–2	**Jacobsen (4–4)**	Viramontes (3–6)			276	8–10	
February 29	Missouri State		Ole Miss Softball Complex	**W** 1–0	**Borgen (3–1)**	Dickerson (3–3)			449	9–10	
February 29	Jackson State		Ole Miss Softball Complex	**W** 9–1^{(5)}	**Borgen (3–1)**	Dickerson (3–3)			449	10–10	

March
Date	Opponent	Rank	Site/stadium	Score	Win	Loss	Save	TV	Attendance	Overall record	SEC record
March 1	California Baptist		Ole Miss Softball Complex	**W** 6–2	**Jacobsen (5–4)**	Lopez (2–5)	**Tillmann (2)**		449	11–10	
March 3	Central Arkansas		Ole Miss Softball Complex	**W** 8–0^{(5)}	**Borgen (4–1)**	Johnson (4–3)			155	12–10	
March 6	at Missouri		Mizzou Softball Stadium; Columbia, MO	**L** 1–9^{(6)}	Schumacher (4–2)	**Jacobsen (5–5)**			880	12–11	0–1
March 7	at Missouri		Mizzou Softball Stadium	**L** 1–6	Nichols (3–2)	**Tillmann (3–3)**	Schumacher (1)		1,162	12–12	0–2
March 8	at Missouri		Mizzou Softball Stadium	**L** 1–3	Weber (5–1)	**Jacobsen (5–6)**	Daniel (5)		916	12–13	0–3
March 11	Youngstown State		Ole Miss Softball Complex								
March 13	UCF		Ole Miss Softball Complex								
March 14	UCF		Ole Miss Softball Complex								
March 15	UCF		Ole Miss Softball Complex								
March 17	Louisiana–Monroe		Ole Miss Softball Complex								
March 20	Texas A&M		Ole Miss Softball Complex								
March 21	Texas A&M		Ole Miss Softball Complex								
March 22	Texas A&M		Ole Miss Softball Complex								
March 25	at Memphis		Tigers Softball Complex; Memphis, TN								
March 28	at Florida		Katie Seashole Pressly Softball Stadium; Gainesville, FL								
March 29	at Florida		Katie Seashole Pressly Softball Stadium								
March 30	at Florida		Katie Seashole Pressly Softball Stadium								

April
Date	Opponent	Rank	Site/stadium	Score	Win	Loss	Save	TV	Attendance	Overall record	SEC record
April 1	Belmont		Ole Miss Softball Complex								
April 3	LSU		Ole Miss Softball Complex								
April 4	LSU		Ole Miss Softball Complex								
April 5	LSU		Ole Miss Softball Complex								
April 9	at Auburn		Jane B. Moore Field; Auburn, AL								
April 10	at Auburn		Jane B. Moore Field								
April 11	at Auburn		Jane B. Moore Field								
April 17	Alabama		Ole Miss Softball Complex								
April 18	Alabama		Ole Miss Softball Complex								
April 19	Alabama		Ole Miss Softball Complex								
April 22	UT Martin		Ole Miss Softball Complex								
April 24	at Tennessee		Sherri Parker Lee Stadium; Knoxville, TN								
April 25	at Tennessee		Sherri Parker Lee Stadium								
April 26	at Tennessee		Sherri Parker Lee Stadium								
April 29	Southern Miss		Ole Miss Softball Complex								

May
Date	Opponent	Rank	Site/stadium	Score	Win	Loss	Save	TV	Attendance	Overall record	SEC record
May 1	Kentucky		Ole Miss Softball Complex								
May 2	Kentucky		Ole Miss Softball Complex								
May 3	Kentucky		Ole Miss Softball Complex								

Postseason

SEC Tournament
Date	Opponent	Seed	Site/stadium	Score	Win	Loss	Save	TV	Attendance	Overall record	SECT Record
May 6–9			Rhoads Stadium; Tuscaloosa, AL								

Legend: = Win = Loss = Cancelled
Bold = Ole Miss team member

*Rankings are based on the team's current ranking in the NFCA poll.

== Rankings ==
Ranking movements Legend: ██ Increase in ranking ██ Decrease in ranking — = Not ranked RV = Received votes
	Week																
Poll	Pre	1	2	3	4	5	6	7	8	9	10	11	12	13	14	15	Final
NFCA / USA Today	21	—	—	—	—	—											
Softball America	—	—	—	—	—	—											
ESPN.com/USA Softball	25	RV	—	—	—	—											
D1Softball	—	—	—	—	—	—											
