= Ruben Felix =

American baseball player

Biographical details
- Born: June 24, 1970 (age 56); El Paso, Texas)
- Education: New Mexico State

Coaching career (HC unless noted)
- 2001–2004: Galveston Junior College (assistant)
- 2010–2014: UCF (assistant)
- 2015–2019: Ole Miss (assistant)
- 2020: Ole Miss (interim HC)

Head coaching record
- Overall: 12–13 (.480)

Ruben Felix (born June 24, 1970 in El Paso, Texas) was the bullpen catcher and batting practice pitcher for MLB's Baltimore Orioles from 2008 to 2009.

== Career ==
Prior to joining the Orioles, Felix was with the Cleveland Indians organization as an assistant on the Major League coaching staff. He took that position in February 2004. Previously, he was the head baseball coach at Galveston College for three seasons, from 2001 to 04, before joining Eric Wedge's staff. He also worked as an assistant coach for the Texas Tech Red Raiders baseball and softball teams. While working at Texas Tech, he earned a degree in general studies.

== Head coaching record ==
Record table
Season	Team	Overall	Conference	Standing	Postseason
Ole Miss Rebels (Southeastern Conference) (2020)
2020	Ole Miss	12–13 (Note: The season was not played past March 8 due to the COVID-19 pandemic in the United States.)	0–3		
Ole Miss:		12–13 (.480)	0–3 (.000)		
Total:		12–13 (.480)			

== Personal ==
Felix's wife's name is Michelle. They reside in Oxford, Mississippi.
