= 2020 Alabama Crimson Tide softball team =

American college softball season

2020 Alabama Crimson Tide softball
- Conference: Southeastern Conference

Ranking
- Coaches: No. 9
- Record: 14-8 (2-1 SEC)
- Head coach: Patrick Murphy (22nd season)
- Assistant coaches: Alyson Habetz; Stephanie VanBrakle Prothro
- Home stadium: Rhoads Stadium

2020 Southeastern Conference softball standings
	Conf.				Overall
Team	W		L	PCT	W		L	PCT
No. 7 Florida ‍‍‍	3	–	0	1.000	23	–	4	.852
No. 23 Missouri ‍‍‍	3	–	0	1.000	19	–	7	.731
No. 11 Kentucky ‍‍‍	2	–	1	.667	20	–	4	.833
No. 14 Georgia ‍‍‍	2	–	1	.667	23	–	5	.821
No. 10 Alabama ‍‍‍	2	–	1	.667	14	–	8	.636
No. 20 Arkansas ‍‍‍	1	–	2	.333	19	–	6	.760
No. 16 South Carolina ‍‍‍	1	–	2	.333	17	–	6	.739
Texas A&M ‍‍‍	1	–	2	.333	17	–	9	.654
No. 21 Mississippi State ‍‍‍	0	–	0	–	25	–	3	.893
No. 5 LSU ‍‍‍	0	–	0	–	21	–	3	.875
Tennessee ‍‍‍	0	–	0	–	14	–	9	.609
Auburn ‍‍‍	0	–	3	.000	16	–	11	.593
Ole Miss ‍‍‍	0	–	3	.000	12	–	13	.480
† – Conference champion ‡ – Tournament champion y – Invited to the NCAA tournament As of March 13, 2020; Rankings from NFCA

The 2020 Alabama Crimson Tide softball team represented the University of Alabama during the 2020 NCAA Division I softball season. The Crimson Tide play their home games at Rhoads Stadium.

== Previous season ==
The Crimson Tide finished the 2019 season 60–10 overall, and 18–6 in the SEC to finish first in the conference. The Crimson Tide hosted both a Regional and Super Regional during the 2019 NCAA Division I softball tournament and advanced to the Women's College World Series. The Crimson Tide were defeated by Oklahoma in the WCWS semifinals.

== Preseason ==
=== SEC preseason poll ===
The SEC preseason poll was released on January 15, 2020.

Media poll
Predicted finish	Team
1	Alabama
2	Tennessee
3	LSU
4	Kentucky
5	Florida
6	Georgia
7	Arkansas
8	Ole Miss
9	South Carolina
10	Missouri
11	Auburn
12	Mississippi State; Texas A&M

== Schedule and results ==
The season was cancelled ending on March 12, 2020.

2020 Alabama Crimson Tide Softball Game Log
Regular season

February
Date	Opponent	Rank	Site/stadium	Score	Win	Loss	Save	TV	Attendance	Overall record	SEC record
February 7	vs. North Carolina	No. 2	JoAnne Graf Field; Tallahassee, FL	**W** 5–2	**L. Kilfoyl** (1–0)	H. George (0–1)	**S. Cornell** (1)			1–0	
February 7	at No. 9 Florida State	No. 2	JoAnne Graf Field	**L** 7–8 (8)	C. Davis (2–0)	**L. Kilfoyl** (1–1)			1,468	1–1	
February 8	at No. 9 Florida State	No. 2	JoAnne Graf Field	**L** 0–8 (5)	C. Arnold (1–0)	**S. Cornell** (0–1)				1–2	
February 8	vs. North Carolina	No. 2	JoAnne Graf Field	**L** 8–9	H. George (1–1)	**L. Kilfoyl** (1–2)			1,628	1–3	
February 13	vs. Liberty; St. Pete/Clearwater Elite Invitational	No. 9	Eddie C. Moore Complex; Clearwater, FL	**W** 7–1	**K. Goodman** (1–0)	E. Kirby (0–1)			511	2–3	
February 13	vs. No. 1 Washington; St. Pete/Clearwater Elite Invitational	No. 9	Eddie C. Moore Complex	**W** 8–0 (5)	**L. Kilfoyl** (2–2)	G. Plain (4–1)			538	3–3	
February 14	vs. South Florida; St. Pete/Clearwater Elite Invitational	No. 9	Eddie C. Moore Complex	**W** 9–1 (5)	**S. Cornell** (1–1)	G. Corrick (0–3)			133	4–3	
February 14	vs. No. 3 UCLA; St. Pete/Clearwater Elite Invitational	No. 9	Eddie C. Moore Complex	L 0-7	**M. Faraimo** (4-0)	**M. Fouts** (0-1)			1,023	4-4	
February 15	vs. No. 16 Oklahoma State; St. Pete/Clearwater Elite Invitational	No. 9	Eddie C. Moore Complex	L 1-4	**C. Eberle** (3-1)	**M. Fouts** (0-2)			1,043	4-5	
February 21	Wichita State	No. 10	Rhoads Stadium; Tuscaloosa, AL	W 13-2	**L. Kilfoyl** (3-2)	**B. Lange** (2-5)			3,324	5-5	
February 21	Penn State	No. 10	Rhoads Stadium	W 5-0	**M. Fouts** (1-2)	**B. Parshall** (2-2)			3,324	6-5	
February 22	Louisville	No. 10	Rhoads Stadium	W 9-0 (5 inn)	**L. Kilfoyl** (4-2)	**T. Roby** (3-2)			3,739	7-5	
February 22	Penn State	No. 10	Rhoads Stadium	W 14-6 (5 inn)	**K. Goodman** 2-0	**B. Parshall (2-3)**			3,739	8-5	
February 23	Louisville	No. 10	Rhoads Stadium	W 10-0 (5 inn)	**M. Fouts** 2-2	**C. Harris 2-5**			3,199	9-5	
February 26	at UAB	No. 8	Mary Bowers Field; Birmingham, AL								
February 28	UT Arlington	No. 8	Rhoads Stadium	W 11-3						10-5	
February 28	No. 7 Arizona	No. 8	Rhoads Stadium								
February 29	No. 7 Arizona	No. 8	Rhoads Stadium								
February 29	UT Arlington	No. 8	Rhoads Stadium								

March
Date	Opponent	Rank	Site/stadium	Score	Win	Loss	Save	TV	Attendance	Overall record	SEC record
March 1	McNeese State	No. 8	Rhoads Stadium								
March 4	Alcorn State		Rhoads Stadium								
March 6	Arkansas		Rhoads Stadium								
March 7	Arkansas		Rhoads Stadium								
March 8	Arkansas		Rhoads Stadium								
March 12	BYU		Rhoads Stadium								
March 13	Texas		Rhoads Stadium								
March 14	Bryant		Rhoads Stadium								
March 15	Texas		Rhoads Stadium								
March 18	Troy		Rhoads Stadium								
March 20	at Tennessee		Sherri Parker Lee Stadium; Knoxville, TN								
March 21	at Tennessee		Sherri Parker Lee Stadium								
March 22	at Tennessee		Sherri Parker Lee Stadium								
March 25	at Alabama State		Barbara Williams Softball Complex; Montgomery, AL								
March 27	South Carolina		Rhoads Stadium								
March 28	South Carolina		Rhoads Stadium								
March 29	South Carolina		Rhoads Stadium								
March 31	(United States) USA National Team		Rhoads Stadium								

April
Date	Opponent	Rank	Site/stadium	Score	Win	Loss	Save	TV	Attendance	Overall record	SEC record
April 3	at Mississippi State		Nusz Park; Starkville, MS								
April 4	at Mississippi State		Nusz Park								
April 5	at Mississippi State		Nusz Park								
April 7	UAB		Rhoads Stadium								
April 10	LSU		Rhoads Stadium								
April 10	LSU		Rhoads Stadium								
April 11	LSU		Rhoads Stadium								
April 15	Louisiana		Rhoads Stadium								
April 17	at Ole Miss		Ole Miss Softball Complex; Oxford, MS								
April 18	at Ole Miss		Ole Miss Softball Complex								
April 19	at Ole Miss		Ole Miss Softball Complex								
April 22	North Alabama		Rhoads Stadium								
April 25	Auburn		Rhoads Stadium								
April 26	Auburn		Rhoads Stadium								
April 27	Auburn		Rhoads Stadium								

May
Date	Opponent	Rank	Site/stadium	Score	Win	Loss	Save	TV	Attendance	Overall record	SEC record
May 1	at Missouri		Mizzou Softball Stadium; Columbia, MO								
May 2	at Missouri		Mizzou Softball Stadium								
May 3	at Missouri		Mizzou Softball Stadium								

Postseason

SEC Tournament
Date	Opponent	Seed	Site/stadium	Score	Win	Loss	Save	TV	Attendance	Overall record	SECT Record
May 6–9			Rhoads Stadium								

Legend: = Win = Loss = Cancelled
Bold = Alabama team member

*Rankings are based on the team's current ranking in the NFCA poll.

== Rankings ==
Ranking movements Legend: ██ Increase in ranking ██ Decrease in ranking ( ) = First-place votes
	Week																
Poll	Pre	1	2	3	4	5	6	7	8	9	10	11	12	13	14	15	Final
NFCA / USA Today	2 (11)	9	10	8	9	10											
Softball America	2	11	13	12	11	12											
ESPN.com/USA Softball	1 (12)	9	13	12	13	13											
D1Softball	1	8	9	10	10	11											
