= 2020 South Carolina Gamecocks softball team =

American college softball season

2020 South Carolina Gamecocks softball
- Conference: Southeastern Conference

Ranking
- Coaches: No. 18
- Record: 4–2 (0–0 SEC)
- Head coach: Beverly Smith (10th season)
- Assistant coaches: Lisa Navas; Kaela Jackson
- Home stadium: Carolina Softball Stadium

2020 Southeastern Conference softball standings
	Conf.				Overall
Team	W		L	PCT	W		L	PCT
No. 7 Florida ‍‍‍	3	–	0	1.000	23	–	4	.852
No. 23 Missouri ‍‍‍	3	–	0	1.000	19	–	7	.731
No. 11 Kentucky ‍‍‍	2	–	1	.667	20	–	4	.833
No. 14 Georgia ‍‍‍	2	–	1	.667	23	–	5	.821
No. 10 Alabama ‍‍‍	2	–	1	.667	14	–	8	.636
No. 20 Arkansas ‍‍‍	1	–	2	.333	19	–	6	.760
No. 16 South Carolina ‍‍‍	1	–	2	.333	17	–	6	.739
Texas A&M ‍‍‍	1	–	2	.333	17	–	9	.654
No. 21 Mississippi State ‍‍‍	0	–	0	–	25	–	3	.893
No. 5 LSU ‍‍‍	0	–	0	–	21	–	3	.875
Tennessee ‍‍‍	0	–	0	–	14	–	9	.609
Auburn ‍‍‍	0	–	3	.000	16	–	11	.593
Ole Miss ‍‍‍	0	–	3	.000	12	–	13	.480
† – Conference champion ‡ – Tournament champion y – Invited to the NCAA tournament As of March 13, 2020; Rankings from NFCA

The 2020 South Carolina Gamecocks softball team represented the University of South Carolina in the 2020 NCAA Division I softball season. The Gamecocks played their home games at Carolina Softball Stadium.

== Previous season ==
The Gamecocks finished the 2019 season 38–19 overall, and 9–14 in the SEC to finish eleventh in the conference. The Gamecocks went 2–2 in the Tallahassee Regional during the 2019 NCAA Division I softball tournament.

== Preseason ==
=== SEC preseason poll ===
The SEC preseason poll was released on January 15, 2020.

Media poll
Predicted finish	Team
1	Alabama
2	Tennessee
3	LSU
4	Kentucky
5	Florida
6	Georgia
7	Arkansas
8	Ole Miss
9	South Carolina
10	Missouri
11	Auburn
12	Mississippi State; Texas A&M

== Schedule and results ==
2020 South Carolina Gamecocks Softball Game Log
Regular season

February
Date	Opponent	Rank	Site/stadium	Score	Win	Loss	Save	TV	Attendance	Overall record	SEC record
February 7	Ohio State	No. 19	Carolina Softball Stadium; Columbia, SC	**W** 3–2	**K. Oh** (1–0)	P. Buresch (0–1)		SECN+	100	1–0	
February 7	North Dakota State	No. 19	Carolina Softball Stadium	**W** 4–2	**C. Drotar** (1–0)	P. Vargas (0–1)		SECN+	1,240	2–0	
February 8	Southern Illinois	No. 19	Carolina Softball Stadium	**W** 11–1 (5)	**K. Oh** (2–0)	C. Miller (0–1)		SECN+	1,404	3–0	
February 9	UNC Greensboro	No. 19	Carolina Softball Stadium	**W** 3–2 (9)	**K. Oh** (3–0)	A. Rodruiguez (0–1)		SECN+	1,425	4–0	
February 13	vs. No. 17 Texas Tech; St. Pete/Clearwater Elite Invitational	No. 18	Eddie C. Moore Complex; Clearwater, FL	**L** 1–5	E. Edmoundson (4–0)	**K. Oh** (3–1)		SECN	100	4–1	
February 14	vs. Virginia Tech; St. Pete/Clearwater Elite Invitational	No. 18	Eddie C. Moore Complex	**L** 6–8	K. Rochard (3–2)	**C. Drotar** (1–1)		ESPNU	100	4–2	
February 14	vs. Kansas; St. Pete/Clearwater Elite Invitational	No. 18	Eddie C. Moore Complex					ESPN3			
February 15	vs. No. 1 Washington; St. Pete/Clearwater Elite Invitational	No. 18	Eddie C. Moore Complex					ESPNU			
February 16	vs. No. 20 James Madison; St. Pete/Clearwater Elite Invitational	No. 18	Eddie C. Moore Complex					ESPN3			
February 19	North Carolina Central	No. 22	Carolina Softball Stadium					SECN+			
February 21	Boston College	No. 22	Carolina Softball Stadium					SECN+			
February 21	Iowa State	No. 22	Carolina Softball Stadium					SECN+			
February 22	No. 8 Michigan	No. 22	Carolina Softball Stadium					SECN+			
February 23	Elon	No. 22	Carolina Softball Stadium					SECN+			
February 26	Georgia Southern	No. 16	Carolina Softball Stadium					SECN+			
February 29	Troy	No. 16	Carolina Softball Stadium					SECN+			
February 29	Charlotte	No. 16	Carolina Softball Stadium					SECN+			

March
Date	Opponent	Rank	Site/stadium	Score	Win	Loss	Save	TV	Attendance	Overall record	SEC record
March 1	Charlotte	No. 16	Carolina Softball Stadium					SECN+			
March 1	Troy	No. 16	Carolina Softball Stadium					SECN+			
March 4	College of Charleston		Carolina Softball Stadium					SECN+			
March 6	at Georgia		Turner Softball Stadium; Athens, GA					SECN+			
March 7	at Georgia		Turner Softball Stadium					SECN+			
March 8	at Georgia		Turner Softball Stadium					SECN+			
March 10	at Coastal Carolina		St. John Stadium; Conway, SC								
March 11	Winthrop		Carolina Softball Stadium					SECN+			
March 13	LSU		Carolina Softball Stadium					SECN+			
March 14	LSU		Carolina Softball Stadium					SECN			
March 15	LSU		Carolina Softball Stadium					SECN			
March 18	Presbyterian		Carolina Softball Stadium					SECN+			
March 21	vs. Oklahoma State		Shirley Clements Mewborn Field; Atlanta, GA								
March 22	at Georgia Tech		Shirley Clements Mewborn Field					ACCN+			
March 25	North Carolina		Carolina Softball Stadium					SECN			
March 27	at Alabama		Rhoads Stadium; Tuscaloosa, AL					SECN+			
March 28	at Alabama		Rhoads Stadium					ESPN2			
March 29	at Alabama		Rhoads Stadium					SECN+			

April
Date	Opponent	Rank	Site/stadium	Score	Win	Loss	Save	TV	Attendance	Overall record	SEC record
April 1	at Duke		Duke Softball Stadium; Durham, NC								
April 3	Auburn		Carolina Softball Stadium					SECN+			
April 4	Auburn		Carolina Softball Stadium					SECN+			
April 5	Auburn		Carolina Softball Stadium					SECN+			
April 7	Clemson		Carolina Softball Stadium					SECN+			
April 8	Furman		Carolina Softball Stadium					SECN+			
April 11	at Tennessee		Sherri Parker Lee Stadium; Knoxville, TN					ESPN			
April 12	at Tennessee		Sherri Parker Lee Stadium					SECN			
April 13	at Tennessee		Sherri Parker Lee Stadium					SECN			
April 17	Texas A&M		Carolina Softball Stadium					SECN+			
April 18	Texas A&M		Carolina Softball Stadium					SECN			
April 19	Texas A&M		Carolina Softball Stadium					SECN+			
April 22	Charleston Southern		Carolina Softball Stadium					SECN+			
April 24	at Mississippi State		Nusz Park; Starkville, MS					SECN+			
April 25	at Mississippi State		Nusz Park					SECN			
April 26	at Mississippi State		Nusz Park					SECN+			

May
Date	Opponent	Rank	Site/stadium	Score	Win	Loss	Save	TV	Attendance	Overall record	SEC record
May 1	Florida		Carolina Softball Stadium					SECN+			
May 2	Florida		Carolina Softball Stadium					ESPN2			
May 3	Florida		Carolina Softball Stadium					SECN+			

Postseason

SEC Tournament
Date	Opponent	Seed	Site/stadium	Score	Win	Loss	Save	TV	Attendance	Overall record	SECT Record
May 6–9			Rhoads Stadium; Tuscaloosa, AL								

Legend: = Win = Loss = Cancelled
Bold = South Carolina team member

*Rankings are based on the team's current ranking in the NFCA poll.

== Rankings ==
Ranking movements Legend: ██ Increase in ranking ██ Decrease in ranking
	Week																
Poll	Pre	1	2	3	4	5	6	7	8	9	10	11	12	13	14	15	Final
NFCA / USA Today	19	18	22	16	15	16											
Softball America	22	16	22	15	14	15											
ESPN.com/USA Softball	21	17	22	17	17	16											
D1Softball	20	20	21	15	14	17											
