= Davis Diamond =

Softball facility in Texas

- Interactive map of Davis Diamond
- Address: Penberthy Blvd and Tom Chandler Rd
- Location: College Station Texas, United States 77840
- Coordinates: 30°36′10″N 96°20′46″W
- Owner: Texas A&M University
- Operator: Texas A&M University
- Capacity: 2,000
- Executive suites: 2
- Surface: Latitude 36 Bermuda Grass
- Record attendance: 2,455 - April 23, 2022

Construction
- Opened: April 27, 2018
- Cost: $28.6 million
- Architect: Gensler

Tenant
- Texas A&M Aggies softball (NCAA) (2018-present)

The Davis Diamond is a softball facility and stadium in College Station, Texas. It is home to Texas A&M Aggies softball.

== History ==
After 24 years in the Aggie Softball Complex, the Texas A&M University System Board of Regents approved construction of a new home for Aggie Softball in April 2016. This construction took the form of the Davis Diamond complex.

The softball stadium holds 2,000 fans and includes club level seating as well as two luxury suites. The new press box features two radio booths, a TV booth, and a writing press area.

The stadium bears the name of Becky and Monty Davis. Longtime A&M supporters, the Davises signed a multimillion-dollar gift agreement, one of the largest philanthropic gifts ever made to Texas A&M Athletics, to help fund the $28.6 million softball facility.

== Opening Game ==
Davis Diamond opened on Friday, April 27, 2018, for a series against the Auburn Tigers. While the stadium was not fully complete, the stadium was used to host this last home series of the 2018 season. Becky Davis was in attendance to throw out the first pitch to open the stadium. The first hit in the Davis Diamond was recorded by Kelbi Fortenberry and the first run scored was awarded to Blake-Ann Fritsch. The Aggies won the opening game at the Davis Diamond 3–1.
