= Glenn Moore (softball) =

American softball coach

Current position
- Title: Head coach
- Team: Baylor
- Conference: Big 12
- Record: 914–466 (.662)

Biographical details
- Education: Northwestern State

Playing career

Football
- 1993: Northwestern State
- Position: Tight End

Coaching career (HC unless noted)
- 1990–1991: Northwestern State (Volunteer asst.)
- 1992: Northwestern State (asst.)
- 1997: William Carey
- 1997–1998: LSU (asst.)
- 1998: LSU (Interim)
- 1999–2000: LSU
- 2001–present: Baylor

Head coaching record
- Overall: 1,053–508 (.675)

Accomplishments and honors

Championships
- Big 12 regular season champions (2007); 2× SEC regular season champions (1999, 2000); 2× SEC West division champions (1999, 2000); 2× SEC tournament champions (1999, 2000)

Awards
- Big 12 Co-Coach of the Year (2023); NFCA Division I Central Region Coaching Staff of the Year (2009, 2011); NFCA Division I Midwest Region Coaching Staff of the Year (2007)

Glenn Moore is an American softball coach serving as the head coach of the Baylor Lady Bears softball team. In twenty-five seasons as a collegiate head coach, Moore has a coaching record of 941–442.

== Coaching career ==
=== LSU ===
Prior to coming to Baylor, Moore spent more than three seasons as head coach at LSU. Moore led LSU to the Southeastern Conference championship in 1999 and 2000. While at LSU, Moore had a 117–25 record, including a 53–7 record in the SEC.

Moore was named LSU's head coach prior to the 1998 NCAA Regionals, where he led the Lady Tigers to a 2–2 mark. His first full season as head coach, 1999, saw the Lady Tigers go 56–10 and win both the SEC regular season and tournament titles. LSU repeated its regular-season crown in 2000, going 59–13 and setting a school record for wins while advancing to within a game of the Women's College World Series. LSU appeared in three-straight NCAA tournaments under Moore.

=== William Carey ===
Before his time at LSU, Moore spent one season as the head coach at William Carey College in Hattiesburg, Mississippi. Moore was 22–17 that season and guided the college to a second-place finish in the Gulf South Conference.

=== Early coaching career ===
While enrolled at Northwestern State University, Moore was a volunteer assistant softball coach for two seasons before becoming a full-time assistant in 1992. After coaching football, baseball and basketball at Amite School Center in his hometown of Liberty, Mississippi, he left to coach at William Carey, where he started the softball program.

== Playing career ==
Moore's own athletic career saw him play both football and baseball at Southwest Mississippi Community College before playing tight end at Northwestern State University, where he graduated in 1993. He was inducted into Southwest Mississippi Community College's Hall of Fame in the fall of 2000.

== Head coaching record ==
=== College ===
Record table
| Season | Team | Overall | Conference | Standing | Postseason |
|---|---|---|---|---|---|
William Carey Crusaders (Gulf Coast Athletic Conference) (1997–present)
| 1997 | William Carey | 22–17 | | 2nd | |
| William Carey: | | 22–17 (.564) | – (–) | | |
LSU Tigers (Southeastern Conference) (1998–2000)
| 1998 | LSU | 2–2* | | | NCAA Regionals |
| 1999 | LSU | 56–10 | 27–3 | 1st (West) | NCAA Regionals |
| 2000 | LSU | 59–13 | 26–4 | 1st (West) | NCAA Regionals |
| LSU: | | 117–25 (.824) | 53–7 (.883) | *Served as head coach during the NCAA Tournament. | |
Baylor Lady Bears (Big 12 Conference) (2001–Present)
| 2001 | Baylor | 38–22 | 7–9 | 6th | |
| 2002 | Baylor | 46–18 | 10–8 | 4th | |
| 2003 | Baylor | 31–29 | 3–15 | 10th | |
| 2004 | Baylor | 48–17 | 11–6 | 4th | NCAA Regional |
| 2005 | Baylor | 51–14 | 11–7 | 4th | NCAA Super Regional |
| 2006 | Baylor | 38–22 | 12–6 | 3rd | NCAA Regional |
| 2007 | Baylor | 51–16 | 14–3 | 1st | Women's College World Series |
| 2008 | Baylor | 23–22 | 4–13 | 8th | |
| 2009 | Baylor | 40–22 | 11–7 | T-3rd | NCAA Super Regional |
| 2010 | Baylor | 28–25 | 6–12 | 8th | |
| 2011 | Baylor | 47–15 | 11–7 | 4th | Women's College World Series |
| 2012 | Baylor | 34–22 | 10–14 | 6th | NCAA Regional |
| 2013 | Baylor | 42–17 | 10–8 | 3rd | NCAA Regional |
| 2014 | Baylor | 49–16 | 13–5 | 2nd | Women's College World Series |
| 2015 | Baylor | 41–17 | 12–6 | 2nd | NCAA Regional |
| 2016 | Baylor | 45–14 | 13–4 | 2nd | NCAA Regional |
| 2017 | Baylor | 48–15 | 13–5 | 2nd | Women's College World Series |
| 2018 | Baylor | 38–18 | 12–6 | T-2nd | NCAA Regional |
| 2019 | Baylor | 18–31 | 2–16 | 7th | |
| 2020 | Baylor | 19–5 | 0–0 | | Season canceled due to COVID-19 |
| 2021 | Baylor | 27–23 | 8–9 | 4th | NCAA Regional |
| 2022 | Baylor | 32–24 | 6–12 | 5th | NISC Champions |
| 2023 | Baylor | 40–18 | 8–10 | 4th | NCAA Regional |
| 2024 | Baylor | 36–23 | 14–13 | 4th | NCAA Regional |
| 2025 | Baylor | 13–20 | 2–7 | | |
| Baylor: | | 927–486 (.656) | 221–192 (.535) | | |
| Total: | | 1,066–528 (.669) | | | |
National champion Postseason invitational champion Conference regular season champion Conference regular season and conference tournament champion Division regular season champion Division regular season and conference tournament champion Conference tournament champion
