= 2012 NCAA Division I softball season =

American college softball season

- Defending Champions: Arizona State

Tournament

Women's College World Series
- Champions: Alabama (1st title)
- Runners-up: Oklahoma (7th WCWS Appearance)
- Winning Coach: Patrick Murphy (1st title)
- WCWS MOP: Jaclyn Traina (Alabama)

Seasons
- ← 2011 2013 →

The 2012 NCAA Division I softball season, play of college softball in the United States organized by the National Collegiate Athletic Association (NCAA) at the Division I level, began in February 2012. The season progressed through the regular season, many conference tournaments and championship series, and concluded with the 2012 NCAA Division I softball tournament and 2012 Women's College World Series. The Women's College World Series, consisting of the eight remaining teams in the NCAA Tournament and held in Oklahoma City at ASA Hall of Fame Stadium, ended on June 6, 2012.

== Conference standings ==
2012 Big 12 Conference softball standings
	Conf.				Overall
Team	W		L	PCT	W		L	PCT
No. 2 Oklahoma ‍†‍‍^{y}	19	–	5	.792	54	–	10	.844
No. 11 Missouri ‍‍‍^{y}	17	–	7	.708	47	–	17	.734
No. 9 Texas ‍‍‍^{y}	16	–	8	.667	47	–	13	.783
No. 19 Texas A&M ‍‍‍^{y}	16	–	8	.667	41	–	18	.695
Texas Tech ‍‍‍^{y}	13	–	10	.565	41	–	17	.707
Baylor ‍‍‍^{y}	10	–	14	.417	34	–	22	.607
Oklahoma State ‍‍‍	8	–	16	.333	25	–	26	.490
Kansas ‍‍‍	6	–	17	.261	31	–	20	.608
Iowa State ‍‍‍	2	–	22	.083	14	–	39	.264
† – Conference champion y – Invited to the NCAA tournament Rankings from NFCA

2012 Southland Conference softball standings
	Conf.						Overall
Team	W		L		PCT		W	L		PCT
Texas State **‡ ‍‍‍	18	–	2	–	0	.900		39	–	17	–	0	.696
Sam Houston ‍‍‍	14	–	6	–	0	.700		29	–	21	–	0	.580
Central Arkansas ‍‍‍	12	–	8	–	0	.600		36	–	22	–	0	.621
McNeese State ‍‍‍	12	–	8	–	0	.600		34	–	21	–	0	.618
Texas–San Antonio ‍‍‍	12	–	8	–	0	.600		24	–	28	–	0	.462
Texas A&M–Corpus Christi ‍‍‍	11	–	9	–	0	.550		18	–	23	–	0	.439
Nicholls ‍‍‍	8	–	12	–	0	.400		14	–	31	–	0	.311
Northwestern State ‍‍‍	7	–	13	–	0	.350		19	–	31	–	0	.380
Stephen F. Austin ‍‍‍	6	–	14	–	0	.300		16	–	33	–	0	.327
Texas–Arlington ‍‍‍	5	–	15	–	0	.250		15	–	27	–	0	.357
Southeastern Louisiana ‍‍‍	5	–	15	–	0	.250		15	–	34	–	0	.306
‡ – SLC Tournament Champion; **Southland Tournament #1 seed champion As of May 20, 2012; Rankings from USA Today/NFCA Coaches

2012 Big Ten Conference softball standings
	Conf.				Overall
Team	W		L	PCT	W		L	PCT
No. 15 Michigan ‍†‍‍^{y}	18	–	5	.783	42	–	17	.712
Iowa ‍‍‍	16	–	8	.667	27	–	26	.509
Nebraska ‍‍‍	14	–	9	.609	33	–	22	.600
Indiana ‍‍‍	14	–	10	.583	30	–	25	.545
Northwestern ‍‍‍^{y}	14	–	10	.583	29	–	29	.500
Wisconsin ‍‍‍	13	–	10	.565	34	–	19	.642
Purdue ‍‍‍	13	–	10	.565	31	–	22	.585
Ohio State ‍‍‍	10	–	13	.435	31	–	23	.574
Minnesota ‍‍‍	10	–	14	.417	31	–	22	.585
Illinois ‍‍‍	11	–	14	.440	27	–	26	.509
Penn State ‍‍‍	9	–	15	.375	18	–	32	.360
Michigan State ‍‍‍	0	–	23	.000	11	–	42	.208
† – Conference champion y – Invited to the NCAA tournament As of May 25, 2012; Rankings from NFCA

2012 Sun Belt Conference softball standings
	Conf.				Overall
Team	W		L	PCT	W		L	PCT
No. 12 Louisiana–Lafayette ‍†‍‍^{y}	21	–	3	.875	53	–	6	.898
South Alabama ‍‍‡‍^{y}	17	–	7	.708	41	–	17	.707
FIU ‍‍‍	15	–	9	.625	28	–	27	.509
North Texas ‍‍‍	13	–	10	.565	28	–	26	.519
Western Kentucky ‍‍‍	11	–	12	.478	33	–	25	.569
Troy ‍‍‍	10	–	14	.417	31	–	24	.564
Louisiana–Monroe ‍‍‍	9	–	15	.375	25	–	26	.490
Florida Atlantic ‍‍‍	5	–	18	.217	15	–	39	.278
Middle Tennessee ‍‍‍	5	–	18	.217	16	–	33	.327
† – Conference champion ‡ – Tournament champion y – Invited to the NCAA tournament As of May 20, 2019; Rankings from

== Women's College World Series ==
The 2010 NCAA Women's College World Series took place from May 31 to June 6, 2012 in Oklahoma City.

First round
1	California	5
LSU	3
4	Oklahoma	5
South Florida	1
LSU	1
South Florida	0
3	Arizona State	3
11	Oregon	1
2	Alabama	5
7	Tennessee	3
11	Oregon	3
7	Tennessee	1

Second round
1	California	0
4	Oklahoma	3
LSU	0
3	Arizona State	6
3	Arizona State	1
2	Alabama	2
11	Oregon	3
1	California	6

Semifinals
4	Oklahoma	5	—
3	Arizona State	3	—
2	Alabama	5	—
1	California	2	—

Finals
4	Oklahoma	4	6	4
2	Alabama	1	8	5

== Season leaders ==
Batting

- Batting average: .492 – Samantha Fischer, Loyola Marymount Lions
- RBIs: 94 – Christi Orgeron, Louisiana Ragin' Cajuns
- Home run:s 32 – Camilla Carrera, UTEP Miners

Pitching

- WINS: 42-3 – Jaclyn Traina, Alabama Crimson Tide
- ERA: 0.95 (38 ER/280.2 IP) – Olivia Galati, Hofstra Pride
- Strikeouts: 541 – Sara Plourde, UMass Minutewomen

== Records ==
Junior class single game RBIs: 11 – Dacia Hale, Louisiana Tech Lady Techsters; May 10, 2012

Sophomore class saves: 12 – Chelsea Leonard, Louisville Cardinals

Senior class season of perfect stolen bases: 45-45 – Sammy Marshall, Western Illinois Leathernecks

== Awards ==
- USA Softball Collegiate Player of the Year:

Keilani Ricketts, Oklahoma Sooners

- Honda Sports Award Softball:

Keilani Ricketts, Oklahoma Sooners

Year	W	L	GP	GS	CG	SHO	SV	IP	H	R	ER	BB	SO	ERA	WHIP
2012	37	9	49	43	34	15	2	292.0	163	64	45	51	457	1.08	0.73

YEAR	G	AB	R	H	BA	RBI	HR	3B	2B	TB	SLG	BB	SO	SB	SBA
2012	63	160	42	64	.400	49	17	2	13	132	.825%	53	31	6	7

== All America Teams ==
The following players were members of the All-American Teams.

First Team

Position	Player	Class	School
P	Keilani Ricketts	JR.	Oklahoma Sooners
P	Jolene Henderson	SR.	California Golden Bears
P	Ellen Renfroe	SO.	Tennessee Lady Vols
C	Jessica Shults	SO.	Oklahoma Sooners
1B	Lauren Chamberlain	FR.	Oklahoma Sooners
2B	Lauren Gibson	JR.	Tennessee Lady Vols
3B	Stephany LaRosa	FR.	UCLA Bruins
SS	Katelyn Boyd	SR.	Arizona State Sun Devils
OF	Alix Johnson	SO.	Arizona State Sun Devils
OF	Michelle Moultrie	SR.	Florida Gators
OF	Christi Orgeron	SR.	ULL Ragin' Cajuns
UT	Valerie Arioto	SR.	California Golden Bears
UT	Camilla Carrera	SR.	UTEP Miners
AT-L	Rachele Fico	JR.	LSU Tigers
AT-L	Olivia Galati	JR.	Hofstra Pride
AT-L	Chelsea Thomas	JR.	Missouri Tigers
AT-L	Jaclyn Traina	SO.	Alabama Crimson Tide
AT-L	Delaney Willard	SR.	BYU Cougars

Second Team

Position	Player	Class	School
P	Sara Nevins	SO.	USF Bulls
P	Stephanie Ricketts	SR.	Hawaii Rainbow Wahine
P	Hannah Rogers	SO.	Florida Gators
C	Amy Buntin	JR.	Notre Dame Fighting Irish
1B	Andrea Harrison	SR.	UCLA Bruins
2B	Lexy Bennett	SR.	Texas Longhorns
3B	Raven Chavanne	JR.	Tennessee Lady Vols
SS	Kaila Hunt	SO.	Alabama Crimson Tide
OF	Ashley Fleming	SR.	Missouri Tigers
OF	Jamia Reid	SR.	California Golden Bears
OF	Katie Schroeder	SR.	UCLA Bruins
UT	Kaitlin Ingelsby	SO.	Washington Huskies
UT	Amanda Locke	SR.	Alabama Crimson Tide
AT-L	Samantha Fischer	SR.	Loyola Marymount Lions
AT-L	Samantha Pappas	JR.	Oregon Ducks
AT-L	Kristyn Sandberg	SR.	Georgia Bulldogs
AT-L	Madison Shipman	SO.	Tennessee Lady Vols
AT-L	Kirsten Verdun	SO.	DePaul Blue Demons

Third Team

Position	Player	Class	School
P	Erin Arevalo	SR.	Georgia Bulldogs
P	Jenna Caira	SR.	Syracuse Orange
P	Jessica Moore	JR.	Oregon Ducks
C	Haley Outon	SO.	Houston Cougars
1B	Nikki Armagost	JR.	Pacific Tigers
2B	Jenna Rich	JR.	Stanford Cardinal
3B	Marisa Bast	SO.	Norhwestern Wildcats
SS	Nerissa Myers	JR.	ULL Ragin' Cajuns
OF	Jennifer Fenton	SR.	Alabama Crimson Tide
OF	Tara Glover	FR.	Boise State Broncos
OF	Katie Smith	SR.	ULL Ragin' Cajuns
UT	Melissa Dumezich	JR.	Texas A&M Aggies
UT	Samantha Camuso	SR.	UCLA Bruins
AT-L	Nichole Beall	SR.	Radford Highlanders
AT-L	Tori Collins	SR.	Louisville Cardinals
AT-L	Tanner Fowler	SO.	Louisville Cardinals
AT-L	Jessica Garcia	SR.	New Mexico Lobos
AT-L	Hayley Miles	SO.	San Diego State Aztecs
