= 2012 Oklahoma Sooners softball team =

American college softball season

2012 Oklahoma Sooners softball

NCAA Norman Regional champion NCAA Norman Super Regional champion Big 12 champion

Women's College World Series, runner-up
- Conference: Big 12 Conference
- Record: 54–10 (16–5 Big 12)
- Head coach: Patty Gasso (18th season)
- Home stadium: OU Softball Complex

2012 Big 12 Conference softball standings
	Conf.				Overall
Team	W		L	PCT	W		L	PCT
No. 2 Oklahoma ‍†‍‍^{y}	19	–	5	.792	54	–	10	.844
No. 11 Missouri ‍‍‍^{y}	17	–	7	.708	47	–	17	.734
No. 9 Texas ‍‍‍^{y}	16	–	8	.667	47	–	13	.783
No. 19 Texas A&M ‍‍‍^{y}	16	–	8	.667	41	–	18	.695
Texas Tech ‍‍‍^{y}	13	–	10	.565	41	–	17	.707
Baylor ‍‍‍^{y}	10	–	14	.417	34	–	22	.607
Oklahoma State ‍‍‍	8	–	16	.333	25	–	26	.490
Kansas ‍‍‍	6	–	17	.261	31	–	20	.608
Iowa State ‍‍‍	2	–	22	.083	14	–	39	.264
† – Conference champion y – Invited to the NCAA tournament Rankings from NFCA

The 2012 Oklahoma Sooners softball team represented the University of Oklahoma in the 2012 NCAA Division I softball season. The Sooners were coached by Patty Gasso, who led her eighteenth season. The Sooners finished with a record of 53–10.

The Sooners were invited to the 2012 NCAA Division I Softball Tournament, where they swept the NCAA Norman Regional and Super Regional and then completed a run to the title game of the Women's College World Series where they fell to champion Alabama.

== Roster ==
2012 Oklahoma Sooners roster
Pitchers: - Allee Allen; - Kirsten Allen; 10 - Keilani Ricketts - Junior; 32 - Michelle Gascoigne - Junior; Catchers: - Katie Norris - Senior; 18 - Jessica Shults - Junior	Infielders: - Ali Vandever - Sophomore; 7 - Javon Henson - Sophomore; 17 - Kelley Reeves - Freshman; 27 - Jessica Vest - Freshman; 44 - Lauren Chamberlain - Freshman	Outfielders: - Erica Sampson - Freshman; 00 - Destinee Martinez - Sophomore; 2 - Brianna Turang - Junior; 12 - Callie Parsons - Freshman; 23 - Brittany Williams - Sophomore

== Schedule ==
Legend
	Oklahoma win
	Oklahoma loss
*	Non-Conference game

2012 Oklahoma Sooners softball game log
Regular season

February
Date	Opponent	Site/stadium	Score	Overall record	Big 12 record
Feb 10	vs Cal State Bakersfield*	Eller Media Stadium • Paradise, NV (Eller Media Stadium Classic)	W 6–0	1–0	
Feb 10	at UNLV*	Eller Media Stadium • Paradise, NV (Eller Media Stadium Classic)	W 5–0	2–0	
Feb 11	vs Weber State*	Eller Media Stadium • Paradise, NV (Eller Media Stadium Classic)	W 12–2^{5}	3–0	
Feb 11	vs Kent State*	Eller Media Stadium • Paradise, NV (Eller Media Stadium Classic)	W 6–0	4–0	
Feb 12	vs Kent State*	Eller Media Stadium • Paradise, NV (Eller Media Stadium Classic)	W 11–1	5–0	
Feb 17	vs Virginia Tech*	Jane B. Moore Field • Auburn, AL (ACC/Big 12/SEC Challenge)	W 10–0^{5}	6–0	
Feb 17	vs No. 23 Georgia Tech*	Jane B. Moore Field • Auburn, AL (ACC/Big 12/SEC Challenge)	L 0–1	6–1	
Feb 23	vs San Diego State*	Big League Dreams Sports Complex • Cathedral City, CA (Cathedral City Classic)	W 5–0	7–1	
Feb 23	vs UC Davis*	Big League Dreams Sports Complex • Cathedral City, CA (Cathedral City Classic)	W 10–0^{5}	8–1	
Feb 24	vs Boise State*	Big League Dreams Sports Complex • Cathedral City, CA (Cathedral City Classic)	W 9–0^{5}	9–1	
Feb 24	vs No. 14 Stanford*	Big League Dreams Sports Complex • Cathedral City, CA (Cathedral City Classic)	L 0–5	9–2	
Feb 25	vs No. 13 Georgia*	Big League Dreams Sports Complex • Cathedral City, CA (Cathedral City Classic)	L 2–3	9–3	
Feb 29	at North Texas*	Lovelace Stadium • Denton, TX	W 4–1	10–3	

March
Date	Opponent	Site/stadium	Score	Overall record	Big 12 record
Mar 2	LSU*	OU Softball Complex • Norman, OK	W 7–0	11–3	
Mar 3	vs LSU*	ASA Hall of Fame Stadium • Oklahoma City, OK	W 5–0	12–3	
Mar 3	vs Iowa*	ASA Hall of Fame Stadium • Oklahoma City, OK	W 6–3	13–3	
Mar 4	Iowa*	OU Softball Complex • Norman, OK	W 4–2	14–3	
Mar 6	Austin Peay*	OU Softball Complex • Norman, OK	W 8–0^{5}	15–3	
Mar 9	Wichita State*	OU Softball Complex • Norman, OK	W 13–0^{5}	16–3	
Mar 9	Indiana*	OU Softball Complex • Norman, OK	W 14–0^{5}	17–3	
Mar 10	Wichita State	OU Softball Complex • Norman, OK	W 5–0	18–3	
Mar 11	Indiana	OU Softball Complex • Norman, OK	W 4–1	19–3	
Mar 11	Indiana	OU Softball Complex • Norman, OK	W 12–1^{5}	20–3	
Mar 15	vs No. 24 DePaul*	Anderson Family Field • Fullerton, CA (Judi Garman Classic)	W 18–1^{5}	21–3	
Mar 15	vs No. 19 Michigan*	Anderson Family Field • Fullerton, CA (Judi Garman Classic)	W 2–0	22–3	
Mar 16	vs Virginia*	Anderson Family Field • Fullerton, CA (Judi Garman Classic)	W 9–1	23–3	
Mar 16	vs Penn State*	Anderson Family Field • Fullerton, CA (Judi Garman Classic)	W 6–1	24–3	
Mar 23	at No. 15 Baylor	Getterman Stadium • Waco, TX	W 2–0	25–3	1–0
Mar 24	at No. 15 Baylor	Getterman Stadium • Waco, TX	W 5–0	26–3	2–0
Mar 25	at No. 15 Baylor	Getterman Stadium • Waco, TX	L 0–1	26–4	2–1
Mar 28	vs Oklahoma State	ASA Hall of Fame Stadium • Oklahoma City, OK	W 4–0	27–4	3–1
Mar 30	Kansas	OU Softball Complex • Norman, OK	W 8–0^{5}	28–4	4–1
Mar 31	Kansas	OU Softball Complex • Norman, OK	W 8–0^{6}	29–4	5–1

April
Date	Opponent	Site/stadium	Score	Overall record	Big 12 record
Apr 1	Kansas	OU Softball Complex • Norman, OK	W 6–2	30–4	6–1
Apr 5	Texas Tech*	OU Softball Complex • Norman, OK	W 3–1	31–4	7–1
Apr 6	Texas Tech*	OU Softball Complex • Norman, OK	L 4–5	31–5	7–2
Apr 7	Texas Tech*	OU Softball Complex • Norman, OK	W 4–1	32–5	8–2
Apr 11	at Oklahoma State*	Cowgirl Stadium • Stillwater, OK	W 11–1^{5}	33–5	9–2
Apr 13	at No. 14 Texas A&M	Aggie Softball Complex • College Station, TX	W 6–1	34–5	10–2
Apr 14	at No. 14 Texas A&M	Aggie Softball Complex • College Station, TX	W 5–2	35–5	11–2
Apr 14	at No. 14 Texas A&M	Aggie Softball Complex • College Station, TX	L 0–4	35–6	11–3
Apr 18	North Texas*	OU Softball Complex • Norman, OK	W 9–4	36–6	
Apr 20	No. 10 Missouri	OU Softball Complex • Norman, OK	W 2–1^{10}	37–6	12–3
Apr 21	No. 10 Missouri	OU Softball Complex • Norman, OK	L 2–4^{8}	37–7	12–4
Apr 22	No. 10 Missouri	OU Softball Complex • Norman, OK	W 2–1	38–7	13–4
Apr 25	Oklahoma State	OU Softball Complex • Norman, OK	W 7–1	39–7	14–4
Apr 28	at Central Arkansas*	Farris Field • Conway, AR	W 8–0^{6}	40–7	

May
Date	Opponent	Site/stadium	Score	Overall record	Big 12 record
May 4	No. 8 Texas	OU Softball Complex • Norman, OK	W 5–2^{8}	41–7	15–4
May 5	No. 8 Texas	OU Softball Complex • Norman, OK	W 9–3	42–7	16–4
May 6	No. 8 Texas	OU Softball Complex • Norman, OK	L 5–12	42–8	16–5
May 11	at Iowa State	Cyclone Sports Complex • Ames, IA	W 10–0	43–8	17–5
May 12	at Iowa State	Cyclone Sports Complex • Ames, IA	W 12–1^{5}	44–8	18–5
May 13	at Iowa State	Cyclone Sports Complex • Ames, IA	W 5–1	45–8	19–5

Postseason

NCAA Norman Regional
Date	Opponent	Seed	Site/stadium	Score	Overall record	Reg record
May 18	Lehigh	(4)	OU Softball Complex • Norman, OK	W 19–3^{3}	46–8	1–0
May 19	Tulsa	(4)	OU Softball Complex • Norman, OK	W 7–1	47–8	2–0
May 20	Oregon State	(4)	OU Softball Complex • Norman, OK	W 6–0	48–8	3–0

NCAA Norman Super Regional
Date	Opponent	Seed	Site/stadium	Score	Overall record	SR record
May 25	No. 17 (13) Arizona	(4)	OU Softball Complex • Norman, OK	W 6–0	49–8	1–0
May 26	No. 17 (13) Arizona	(4)	OU Softball Complex • Norman, OK	W 7–1	50–8	2–0

NCAA Women's College World Series
Date	Opponent	Seed	Site/stadium	Score	Overall record	WCWS Record
May 31	South Florida	(4)	ASA Hall of Fame Stadium • Oklahoma City, OK	W 5–1	51–8	1–0
June 1	(1) California	(4)	ASA Hall of Fame Stadium • Oklahoma City, OK	W 3–0	52–8	2–0
June 3	(3) Arizona State	(4)	ASA Hall of Fame Stadium • Oklahoma City, OK	W 5–3	53–8	3–0
June 4	(2) Alabama	(4)	ASA Hall of Fame Stadium • Oklahoma City, OK	W 4–1	54–8	4–0
June 5	(2) Alabama	(4)	ASA Hall of Fame Stadium • Oklahoma City, OK	L 0–4	54–9	4–1
June 6	(2) Alabama	(4)	ASA Hall of Fame Stadium • Oklahoma City, OK	L 4–5	54–10	4–2
