= Carol Smith =

Carol Smith may refer to:

- Carol Smith (contralto) (1926–2021), American contralto
- Carol Comeau (born 1941), née Smith, American educator
- Carol Smith (radio presenter) (born 1975), Singaporean radio presenter
- Carol Smith (softball), head coach of the LSU Tigers softball team

== See also ==
- Carroll Smith (1932–2003), American race car driver
- Carole Smith (born 1954), American educational administrator
- Caryol Smith, founder of the San Dimas Dog Park
