= Beth Torina =

American softball coach

Current position
- Title: Head coach
- Team: LSU
- Conference: SEC
- Record: 578–253 (.696)

Biographical details
- Born: October 15, 1978 (age 47); Chicago Heights, Illinois, U.S.

Playing career
- 1997–2000: Florida
- Position: Pitcher

Coaching career (HC unless noted)
- 2001–2002: Stetson (asst.)
- 2003–2007: Houston (asst.)
- 2008–2011: FIU
- 2011–2012: USSSA Pride
- 2012–present: LSU

Head coaching record
- Overall: 707–364 (.660)
- Tournaments: 49–29 (.628) (NCAA)

Accomplishments and honors

Championships
- As player: SEC regular season (1998); As assistant coach: C-USA regular season (2007); C-USA Tournament (2007); Cowles Cup (2010); As head coach: 2× Ringor Cup (2011, 2012); SEC West Division (2013)

Awards
- 2× Sun Belt Conference Coach of the Year (2008, 2010)

Elizabeth Dieter Torina (formerly McClendon; born October 15, 1978) is an American softball coach and former pitcher who is the current head coach at LSU.

== Early life and education ==
Born Elizabeth Dieter in Chicago Heights, Illinois, Torina grew up in Orlando, Florida and graduated from Dr. Phillips High School. Originally a walk-on and competing as Beth Dieter, Torina became the number-two pitcher on the Florida Gators softball team at the University of Florida and became the top starting pitcher as a junior in 1999. In her career, Torina made 139 appearances with 105 starts, a 60–39 record, 23 shutouts, and 716.2 innings pitched and is ranked top ten all-time in multiple categories including shutouts, appearances, wins, and starts. As a senior in 2000, Torina had a career-best 1.75 earned run average. Torina graduated in 2000 with a B.S. in health sciences and occupational therapy.

== Coaching career 2001-present ==
=== Assistant coach (2001–2007) ===
From 2000 to 2010, Torina was known as Beth McClendon. Torina began her coaching career as an assistant coach for the Stetson University softball team for two seasons from 2001 to 2002, during which she helped Stetson win a shared regular season Atlantic Sun Conference title in 2001.

She then moved on to Houston from 2003 to 2007 as pitching coach. McClendon helped Houston make its first ever NCAA Tournament appearance in 2004, an at-large bid after the team finished fifth in the Conference USA regular season standings and runners-up in the C-USA tournament. Houston finished the tournament 1–2 in the Baylor regional, beating Texas A&M–Corpus Christi and losing to Seton Hall and Illinois.

In Torina's final season at Houston in 2007, Houston won both the C-USA regular season and tournament titles, both firsts in program history. Upsetting no. 23 Louisiana–Lafayette and regional host no. 7 Texas A&M before losing twice to Texas A&M, Houston went 2–2 in the College Station regional of the NCAA Tournament.

=== FIU (2008–2011) ===
Torina got her first head coaching job at Florida International University (FIU) on July 12, 2007, hired by athletic director Pete Garcia. Inheriting a 22–35 team, Torina led FIU to a 29–34 record and fourth-place finish in the Sun Belt Conference, for which she won her first Sun Belt Coach of the Year award. The following season, FIU finished 31–29, the first winning record in three years.

In 2010, FIU went 38–21 (17–7 Sun Belt) with the program's second-ever NCAA Tournament bid, an at-large bid following second-place finishes in the Sun Belt regular season and tournament. FIU went 2–2 in the Gainesville regional of the 2010 NCAA Tournament, including an upset over regional host and eventual Women's College World Series participant Florida, which was then ranked no. 4 nationally. Torina delivered another winning season in 2011 with a 31–27 record, tied for third in the Sun Belt.

=== LSU (2012–present) ===
On June 20, 2011, Louisiana State University athletic director Joe Alleva named Torina head coach of the LSU Tigers softball team.

In her first year as head coach, she led the Tigers to the quarterfinals of the 2012 Women's College World Series, followed by an SEC West Division title in 2013. Under Torina, LSU made repeat appearances in the Women's College World Series, from 2015 to 2017. Torina led the program to its first ever no. 1 national ranking in 2015 and the program's 1,000th all-time victory in 2016. Following the 2015 season, Torina earned a $45,000 raise that increased her annual salary to $225,000 and one-year contract extension through 2018. By the 2018 season, Torina had produced five NFCA All-American players at LSU.

=== USSSA Pride (2011–2012) ===
Torina was also manager of the USSSA Pride of National Pro Fastpitch from 2011 to 2012. The Pride won the NPF Championship in 2010.

== Personal life ==
Torina's first marriage was to Matt McClendon in 2000; they lived in Pearland, Texas when Torina was an assistant coach at Houston. She is currently married to former Houston Cougars baseball pitcher Nick Torina. They have three daughters.

== Head coaching record ==
Record table
Season	Team	Overall	Conference	Standing	Postseason
FIU Golden Panthers/Panthers (Sun Belt Conference) (2008–2011)
2008	FIU	29–34	12–11	4th	
2009	FIU	31–29	13–11	4th	
2010	FIU	38–21	17–7	2nd	NCAA Regional
2011	FIU	31–27	14–10	T–3rd	
FIU:		129–111 (.538)	56–39 (.589)		
LSU Tigers (Southeastern Conference) (2012–present)
2012	LSU	40–25	15–13	2nd (West)	Women's College World Series
2013	LSU	42–16	15–8	1st (West)	NCAA Regional
2014	LSU	38–24	13–11	2nd (West)	NCAA Regional
2015	LSU	52–14	15–9	3rd	Women's College World Series
2016	LSU	52–18	13–11	7th	Women's College World Series
2017	LSU	48–22	12–12	6th	Women's College World Series
2018	LSU	45–17	13–10	5th	NCAA Super Regional
2019	LSU	43–19	14–10	T–2nd	NCAA Super Regional
2020	LSU	21–3	0–0		Season canceled due to COVID-19
2021	LSU	35–22	13–11	T–5th	NCAA Super Regional
2022	LSU	34–23	13–11	6th	NCAA Regional
2023	LSU	42–17	13–11	6th	NCAA Regional
2024	LSU	44–17	12–12	T–6th	NCAA Super Regional
2025	LSU	42-16	12-12	9th	NCAA Regional
2026	LSU	40-19	13-11	8th	NCAA Super Regional
LSU:		618–272 (.694)	186–152 (.550)		
Total:		747–383 (.661)			
National champion Postseason invitational champion Conference regular season champion Conference regular season and conference tournament champion Division regular season champion Division regular season and conference tournament champion Conference tournament champion
