= 2012 California Golden Bears softball team =

American college softball season

2012 California Golden Bears softball

Women's College World Series Participants Berkeley Super Regional Champions Berkeley Regional Champions Pac-12 Conference Champions
- Conference: Pac-12 Conference
- Record: 56–5 (21–3 Pac-12)
- Head coach: Diane Ninemire (25th season)
- Assistant coach: Tammy Lohmann; John Reeves; Angie Jacobs
- Home stadium: Levine-Fricke Field

The 2012 California Golden Bears softball team is the representative of the University of California in the 2012 NCAA Division I softball season. The team plays their home games in Levine-Fricke Field and they entered the 2012 season after making the Women's College World Series with a 45–13 record in 2011 and making the postseason for 27 straight years.

== Regular season ==
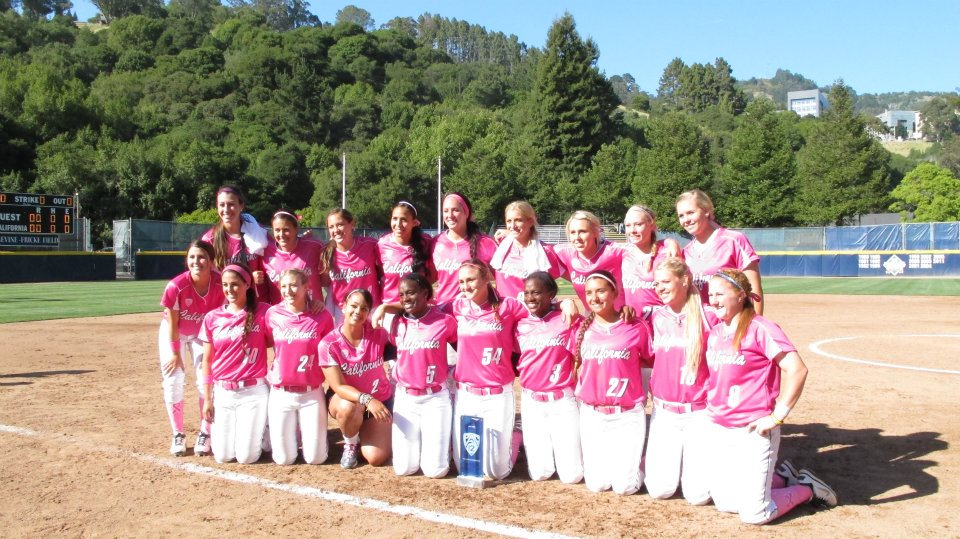
California (in pink jersey because of the "strike out cancer" day) celebrates winning the inaugural Pac-12 Conference championship.

The 2012 season began for the Golden Bears with extremely high expectations with head coach Diane Ninemire going as far as comparing her 2012 squad to the Bears' 2002 national championship team. California started the season as #3 in the NFCA poll and spent most of the first half of the season as #1 in the ESPN poll and #2 in the NFCA poll.

Heading into conference play, the Golden Bears had compiled a record of 26–1 with their only loss coming at the hands of then #18 Hawai'i in extra innings in Honolulu after previously beating #6 Texas in a hard fought game. To start off the conference slate, #2 California traveled across the bay to face #9 Stanford in a 3-game series in Palo Alto, and the Bears promptly swept the Cardinal to earn the #1 spot in both polls for the first time during the 2012 campaign. After the three game sweep of Stanford, the #1 Bears did not slow down, sweeping #3 Washington in Berkeley and unranked Utah in Salt Lake City. After the Washington series, the Bears were the unanimous #1 team in the country according to the NFCA and ESPN polls and at this same time, California came in as #1 in the NCAA's RPI rankings.

The Bears would go on to face #13 Arizona and despite losing their first conference game to the Wildcats, they still won the series 2–1 and retained the #1 ranking in both the NFCA and ESPN polls. The following weekend, the Bears travelled to Eugene to take on the #18 Oregon, and again took two of three games and retained the #1 spot in both polls for a fifth consecutive week. On April 24, 2012, California was in first place in the Pac-12 Conference with Arizona State only one game behind the top ranked Bears. In the second-to-last conference series of the regular season, both the Sun Devils and Bears swept their opponents (Utah and Oregon State respectively) setting up a showdown in Berkeley for the conference championship.

Going into the final weekend series of the regular season, the Golden Bears sported a 19–2 record in conference play and needed to take 2 of 3 from second place (and #2 in the national polls) Arizona State. The Bears won the first game of the series thanks to walk off two-run home run by senior Valerie Arioto and won the second game of the series by a final score of 5-0 therefore winning the inaugural Pac-12 championship. The 2012 conference championship was the Bears' first sole conference championship since 1987 (they shared a title in 2005), which just happened to be the first Pac-10 conference championship that was awarded.

Because California won their conference, they received an automatic bid to the NCAA tournament, and were later awarded the #1 overall seed in the tournament. With the upgrades at Levine-Fricke Field, the Bears hosted NCAA tournament games in Berkeley for the first time since 1993.

=== Attendance statistics ===
In 2012, California broke all attendance records for the softball program partially because on April 11, 2012, the University of California athletic department announced that they had more than doubled the capacity of Levine-Fricke Field by adding 704 bleacher seats in the outfield. On April 29, 2012, the California softball program broke the previous attendance record of 969 in a game against the UCLA Bruins with an announced crowd of 1,069, California then, however, broke the record again later on in the season with a crowd of 1,135 for the final game of the regular season. Overall, the Bears drew a crowd over 1,000 three times during the season for the first time in the program's history.

Capacity: 500 (Feb.-Apr. 10), 1,204 (Apr. 11-)
Average attendance: 529 (56.3% capacity)
Total attendance: 7,939 (15 games)

== Postseason ==
On May 13, 2012, it was announced that the Golden Bears would receive the #1 overall seed in the 2012 NCAA softball tournament and would host a regional at Levine-Fricke Field in Berkeley. Also, if the Bears advance to the Super Regionals, they would also host that series in Berkeley. In the past, Levine-Fricke Field has not been able to host tournament games because it was considered inadequate by NCAA standards, however, the University of California athletic department was able to add approximately 704 bleacher seats in the outfield to bring capacity well above the minimum of 500 in February 2012 and will rent temporary light and build a temporary press box in order to play night games and accommodate television crews.

=== Berkeley Regional and Super Regional ===
The Bears opened up the tournament in Berkeley against the Iona Gaels on Friday, May 18, 2012. The regional will run from Friday, May 18 through Sunday, May 20 and will be a double-elimination tournament featuring #1 seeded California, Iona, Arkansas, and Boston University. The Bears won the first game of the Berkeley Regional by defeating the Iona Gaels 8–0 in 5 innings but then were shocked by Arkansas on day two of the regional losing 3-2 to the Razorbacks. California bounced back by defeating Boston University in 6 innings by a final score of 8–0 and promptly beat Arkansas 10–2 and 7–0 on Sunday to advance to the Super Regional round that will also be played at Levine-Fricke Field. The Bears defeated the #16 seed Washington Huskies in the Berkeley Super Regional in two straight games on May 26 and 27. After sweeping the Berkeley Super Regional, California earned a berth to the Women's College World Series for the 12th time in program history.

=== Women's College World Series ===
On May 27, 2012 the #1 seeded California Golden Bears clinched the program's 12th Women's College World Series berth by defeating the Washington Huskies in the Berkeley Super Regional. The Bears' first opponent in the world series was LSU on Thursday May 30. After falling behind 2-0, Cal rallied and finally took the lead with a 3-run 6th inning. The Bears defeated LSU 5–3 and moved on to face Oklahoma. The Bears fell 3–0 to Oklahoma striking out 16 times against Sooners pitcher Keilani Ricketts. Needing a win to keep their season alive, Cal defeated Oregon 6–3. The Bears' season came to an end the next day with a 5–2 loss to eventual National Champion Alabama.

== Roster ==
2012 California Golden Bears roster
Pitchers: 7 – Arianna Erceg; 54 – Jolene Henderson; 72 – Nikki Owens; Catchers: 6 – Taylor Vincent; 17 – Lindsey Ziegenhirt	Infielders: 2 – Jordan Wallace; 4 – Alex Robben; 8 – Danielle Henderson; 9 – Jace Williams; 10 – Victoria Jones; 18 – Britt Vonk; 22 – Mary Lee; 23 – Ashley Decker; 25 – Breana Kostreba; 27 – Cheyenne Cordes	Outfielders: 1 – Frani Echavarria; 3 – Jamia Reid; 5 – Elia Reid; 24 – LaRisa Jones; Utility: 20 – Valerie Arioto

== Game logs ==
=== Regular season ===
2012 California Golden Bears Softball Game Log
February: 12–0 (Conference: 0–0; Home: 0–0; Road: 0–0; Neutral: 12–0)

#	Date	Opponent	Score	Rank	Win	Loss	Save	Attendance	Record	Stadium	Box
1	February 10	vs. #9 Tennessee	13–5	#3	J. Henderson (1–0)	I. Renfroe (0–1)		408	1–0 (0–0)	Farrington Stadium	W1
2	February 11	vs. Bradley	5–0	#3	V. Arioto (1–0)	M. Lynch-Crumri (1–1)		185	2–0 (0–0)	Farrington Stadium	W2
3	February 11	vs. Texas State	10–0 (5)	#3	J. Henderson (2–0)	C. Hall (0–1)		220	3–0 (0–0)	Farrington Stadium	W3
4	February 12	vs. Syracuse	6–3	#3	J. Henderson (3–0)	J. Caira (2–1)		96	4–0 (0–0)	Farrington Stadium	W4
5	February 17	vs. DePaul	2–0	#1	V. Arioto (2–0)	H. Penna (0–1)			5–0 (0–0)	Eller Media Stadium	W5
6	February 18	vs. San Jose State	7–0	#1	J. Henderson (4–0)	A. Pridmore (0–1)		120	6–0 (0–0)	SLC Park	W6
7	February 18	vs. UC Riverside	10–0 (5)	#1	V. Arioto (3–0)	J. McDonald (0–1)			7–0 (0–0)	SLC Park	W7
8	February 19	vs. LSU	14–3 (5)	#1	J. Henderson (5–0)	B. Mack (1–3)			8–0 (0–0)	Stephanie Craig Park	W8
9	February 24	vs. Fordham	5–0	#1	V. Arioto (4–0)	J. Mineau (0–1)		125	9–0 (0–0)	Big League Dreams	W9
10	February 25	vs. New Mexico St.	2–0	#1	J. Henderson (6–0)	A. Newman (0–1)		120	10–0 (0–0)	Big League Dreams	W10
11	February 25	vs. Cal Poly	4–1	#1	V. Arioto (5–0)	R. Patton (0–1)		120	11–0 (0–0)	Big League Dreams	W11
12	February 26	vs. Cal St. Northridge	7–0	#1	J. Henderson (7–0)	M. Pagano (0–1)		130	12–0 (0–0)	Big League Dreams	W12
	February 29	Pacific		#1	Cancelled (rain)				12–0 (0–0)	Levine-Fricke Field	

March: 19–1 (Conference: 4–0; Home: 4–0; Road: 4–1; Neutral: 11–0)

#	Date	Opponent	Score	Rank	Win	Loss	Save	Attendance	Record	Stadium	Box
13	March 2	vs. FIU	8–1	#1	V. Arioto (6–0)	M. Dawson (5–3)			13–0 (0–0)	Anderson Family Field	W13
14	March 2	vs. Southern Miss	8–0 (5)	#1	J. Henderson (8–0)	G. Luciani (2–1)			14–0 (0–0)	Anderson Family Field	W14
15	March 3	vs. East Carolina	11–3 (5)	#1	V. Arioto (7–0)	C. Smith (2–0)		287	15–0 (0–0)	Anderson Family Field	W15
16	March 3	vs. Northwestern	5–1	#1	J. Henderson (9–0)	M. Lamberth (2–4)			16–0 (0–0)	Anderson Family Field	W16
17	March 7	UC Davis	11–3 (6)	#1	J. Henderson (10–0)	J. Thweatt (2–7)		137	17–0 (0–0)	Levine-Fricke Field	W17
18	March 10	vs. San Diego State	12–0 (5)	#1	J. Henderson (11–0)	R. Arbino (7–5)			18–0 (0–0)	Bulldog Diamond	W18
19	March 10	vs. Butler	14–1 (5)	#1	V. Arioto (8–0)	B. Fisher (1–3)		1,250	19–0 (0–0)	Bulldog Diamond	W19
20	March 11	vs. Purdue	9–1 (6)	#1	J. Henderson (12–0)	A. Whittemore (2–2)		250	20–0 (0–0)	Bulldog Diamond	W20
21	March 11	@ Fresno State	8–5	#1	V. Arioto (9–0)	M. Moses (8–7)			21–0 (0–0)	Bulldog Diamond	W21
22	March 14	vs. #21 Texas A&M	3–0	#1	J. Henderson (13–0)	M. Dumezich (11–5)			22–0 (0–0)	Rainbow Wahine Stadium	W22
23	March 15	vs. #6 Texas	6–3	#1	V. Arioto (10–0)	B. Luna (9–1)	J. Henderson (1)		23–0 (0–0)	Rainbow Wahine Stadium	W23
24	March 15	@ #19 Hawai'i	3–1 (10)	#1	S. Ricketts (13–1)	J. Henderson (13–1)		1,200	23–1 (0–0)	Rainbow Wahine Stadium	L1
25	March 16	vs. Marist	1–0	#1	V. Arioto (11–0)	M. White (1–5)	J. Henderson (2)		24–1 (0–0)	Rainbow Wahine Stadium	W1
26	March 17	vs. Winthrop	7–1	#1	J. Henderson (14–1)	N. Becker (5–7)			25–1 (0–0)	Rainbow Wahine Stadium	W2
27	March 20	Princeton	8–0 (5)	#2	V. Arioto (12–0)	L. Kuhn (1–3)		250	26–1 (0–0)	Levine-Fricke Field	W3
28	March 23	@ #9 Stanford	9–0	#2	J. Henderson (15–1)	T. Gerhart (20–2)		857	27–1 (1–0)	Smith Family Stadium	W4
	March 24	@ #9 Stanford		#2	Postponed (rain); Rescheduled for March 25				27–1 (1–0)	Smith Family Stadium	
29	March 25	@ #9 Stanford	4–3	#2	V. Arioto (13–0)	N. White (5–3)	J. Henderson (3)	462	28–1 (2–0)	Smith Family Stadium	W5
30	March 25	@ #9 Stanford	8–0	#2	J. Henderson (16–1)	T. Gerhart (20–3)		389	29–1 (3–0)	Smith Family Stadium	W6
31	March 28	Sacramento State	8–0 (5)	#1	V. Arioto (14–0)	S. Voelz (4–2)		93	30–1 (3–0)	Levine-Fricke Field	W7
32	March 30	#3 Washington	2–1	#1	J. Henderson (17–1)	K. Inglesby (16–1)		240	31–1 (4–0)	Levine-Fricke Field	W8
	March 31	#3 Washington		#1	Postponed (rain); Rescheduled for April 1				31–1 (4–0)	Levine-Fricke Field	

April: 14–2 (Conference: 12–2; Home: 8–1; Road: 6–1)

#	Date	Opponent	Score	Rank	Win	Loss	Save	Attendance	Record	Stadium	Box
33	April 1	#3 Washington	5–3	#1	V. Arioto (15–0)	K. Stanchek (9–1)			32–1 (5–0)	Levine-Fricke Field	W9
34	April 1	#3 Washington	6–4	#1	J. Henderson (18–1)	K. Inglesby (16–2)		680	33–1 (6–0)	Levine-Fricke Field	W10
35	April 5	@ Utah	10–0 (5)	#1	J. Henderson (19–1)	M. Ramírez (2–1)		203	34–1 (7–0)	Ute Softball Field	W11
	April 6	@ Utah		#1	Postponed (snow); Rescheduled for April 7				34–1 (7–0)	Ute Softball Field	
36	April 7	@ Utah	11–3 (5)	#1	V. Arioto (16–0)	G. Nielson (17–8)		389	35–1 (8–0)	Ute Softball Field	W12
37	April 7	@ Utah	12–3 (6)	#1	J. Henderson (20–1)	G. Nielson (17–9)		503	36–1 (9–0)	Ute Softball Field	W13
38	April 11	@ Saint Mary's	9–0	#1	V. Arioto (17–0)	J. Lemmon (8–9)		220	37–1 (9–0)	Cottrell Field	W14
39	April 13	#13 Arizona	2–0	#1	J. Henderson (21–1)	K. Fowler (12–4)		415	38–1 (10–0)	Levine-Fricke Field	W15
40	April 14	#13 Arizona	8–3	#1	S. Babcock (15–7)	V. Arioto (17–1)		664	38–2 (10–1)	Levine-Fricke Field	L1
41	April 15	#13 Arizona	6–0	#1	J. Henderson (22–1)	K. Fowler (12–5)		517	39–2 (11–1)	Levine-Fricke Field	W1
42	April 18	Santa Clara	10–2 (5)	#1	V. Arioto (18–1)	J. Turner (2–9)		113	40–2 (11–1)	Levine-Fricke Field	W2
43	April 20	@ #14 Oregon	8–1	#1	J. Henderson (23–1)	J. Moore (21–7)		457	41–2 (12–1)	Howe Field	W3
44	April 21	@ #14 Oregon	1–0	#1	J. Moore (22–7)	V. Arioto (18–2)		475	41–3 (12–2)	Howe Field	L1
45	April 22	@ #14 Oregon	10–0 (6)	#1	J. Henderson (24–1)	J. Moore (22–8)		633	42–3 (13–2)	Howe Field	W1
46	April 27	#14 UCLA	3–0	#1	J. Henderson (25–1)	J. Hall (16–8)		353	43–3 (14–2)	Levine-Fricke Field	W2
47	April 28	#14 UCLA	8–0 (6)	#1	V. Arioto (19–2)	J. Hall (16–9)	J. Henderson (4)	841	44–3 (15–2)	Levine-Fricke Field	W3
48	April 29	#14 UCLA	10–3	#1	J. Henderson (26–1)	J. Hall (16–10)		1,069	45–3 (16–2)	Levine-Fricke Field	W4

May: 5–1 (Conference: 5–1; Home: 2–1; Road: 3–0)

#	Date	Opponent	Score	Rank	Win	Loss	Save	Attendance	Record	Stadium	Box
49	May 4	@ #22 Oregon State	9–1 (5)	#1	J. Henderson (27–1)	T. Andreana (9–10)		333	46–3 (17–2)	OSU Softball Complex	W5
50	May 5	@ #22 Oregon State	4–2	#1	J. Henderson (28–1)	M. Demore (7–5)		421	47–3 (18–2)	OSU Softball Complex	W6
51	May 6	@ #22 Oregon State	4–1	#1	J. Henderson (29–1)	P. Hall (4–3)		697	48–3 (19–2)	OSU Softball Complex	W7
52	May 10	#2 Arizona State	4–2	#1	J. Henderson (30–1)	M. Popescue (7–2)		407	49–3 (20–2)	Levine-Fricke Field	W8
53	May 11*	#2 Arizona State	5–0	#1	V. Arioto (20–2)	H. Bach (19–1)		1,025	50–3 (21–2)	Levine-Fricke Field	W9
54	May 12	#2 Arizona State	5–0	#1	D. Escobedo (20–4)	J. Henderson (30–2)		1,135**	50–4 (21–3)	Levine-Fricke Field	L1
*California clinched the 2012 Pac-12 Conference Championship on May 11, 2012 after defeating #2 Arizona State 5–0. **All-time single game attendance record at Levine-Fricke Field.

Legend
California Win	California Loss

*All Rankings are from the ESPN.com/USA Softball Poll

=== Postseason ===
2012 California Golden Bears Softball Postseason Game Log
Berkeley Regional (#1 Seed): 4–1

#	Date	Opponent (Seed)	Score	Rank	Win	Loss	Save	Attendance	Record	Stadium	Box
1	May 18	Iona	8–0 (5)	#1	J. Henderson (31–2)	S. Jackson (17–13)		1,059	1–0	Levine-Fricke Field	W1
2	May 19	Arkansas	3–2	#1	K. Beasley (11–9)	V. Arioto (20–3)	C. Cohen (2)	—	1–1	Levine-Fricke Field	L1
3	May 19	Boston University	8–0 (6)	#1	J. Henderson (32–2)	W. Tuthill (14–6)		1,064	2–1	Levine-Fricke Field	W2
4	May 20	Arkansas	10–2 (5)	#1	J. Henderson (33–2)	H. McLemore (2–1)		—	3–1	Levine-Fricke Field	W3
5	May 20	Arkansas	7–0	#1	J. Henderson (34–2)	K. Beasley (11–10)		1,028	4–1	Levine-Fricke Field	W4

Berkeley Super Regional (#1 Seed vs. #16 Seed): 2–0

#	Date	Opponent (Seed)	Score	Rank	Win	Loss	Save	Attendance	Record	Stadium	Box
1	May 26	#18 Washington (16)	5–0	#1	J. Henderson (35–2)	K. Inglesby (19–11)		1,117	1–0	Levine-Fricke Field	W1
2	May 27	#18 Washington (16)	2–0	#1	J. Henderson (36–2)	B. Walker(10–6)		1,125	2–0	Levine-Fricke Field	W2

Women's College World Series (#1 Seed): 2–2

#	Date	Opponent (Seed)	Score	Rank	Win	Loss	Save	Attendance	Record	Stadium	Box
1	May 31	LSU	5–3	#1	J. Henderson (37–2)	L. Fico (20–12)		8,149	1–0	Hall of Fame Stadium	W1
2	June 1	Oklahoma (4)	3–0	#1	K. Ricketts (35–7)	J. Henderson (37–3)			1–1	Hall of Fame Stadium	L1
3	June 2	Oregon (11)	6–3	#1	J. Henderson (38–3)	J. Moore (33–15)		9,310	2–1	Hall of Fame Stadium	W2
4	June 3	Alabama (2)	5–2	#1	W. Traina (40–2)	J. Henderson (38–4)		9,167	2–2	Hall of Fame Stadium	L2

Legend
California Win	California Loss

Home	Away

*All Rankings are from the ESPN.com/USA Softball Poll

== Rankings and standings ==
=== 2012 ranking movement ===
Ranking movements Legend: ██ Increase in ranking ██ Decrease in ranking
	Week															
Poll	Pre	1	2	3	4	5	6	7	8	9	10	11	12	13	Post	Final
NFCA/USA Today	4	3	3	2	2	2	2	1	1	1	1	1	1	1	1	3
USA Softball/ESPN.com	3	1	1	1	1	1	2	1	1	1	1	1	1	1	1	3
NCAA RPI	Not released							3	1	1	1	1	1	1	1	2

=== 2012 Pac-12 Conference standings ===
		Conference				Overall		
Team		W	L	Pct.	GB	W	L	Pct.
1	#1 California Golden Bears* (WCWS)	21	3	.875	—	50	4	.926
2	#2 Arizona State Sun Devils** (WCWS)	18	4	.818	2	46	7	.868
3	#12 Oregon Ducks** (WCWS)	13	9	.591	7	39	15	.722
4	#16 Arizona Wildcats**	12	12	.500	9	35	17	.673
5	#15 UCLA Bruins**	12	12	.500	9	36	18	.667
6	#17 Stanford Cardinal**	11	13	.458	10	38	17	.691
7	#24 Oregon State Beavers**	9	14	.391	11½	34	21	.618
8	#18 Washington Huskies**	7	16	.304	13½	36	17	.679
9	Utah Utes	2	22	.083	19	28	28	.500

*Automatically qualified for the postseason by virtue of winning the Pac-12 Conference championship.
**Received an at-large berth to the 2012 NCAA softball tournament.

== See also ==
- California Golden Bears
- California Golden Bears softball
- Levine-Fricke Field
- 2012 NCAA Division I softball tournament
- 2011 California Golden Bears football team
- 2011–12 California Golden Bears men's basketball team
- 2012 California Golden Bears baseball team
