= Tiger Park =

Campus soft ball stadium in Baton Rouge, US

Coordinates: 30°24′38.232″N 91°11′33.432″W

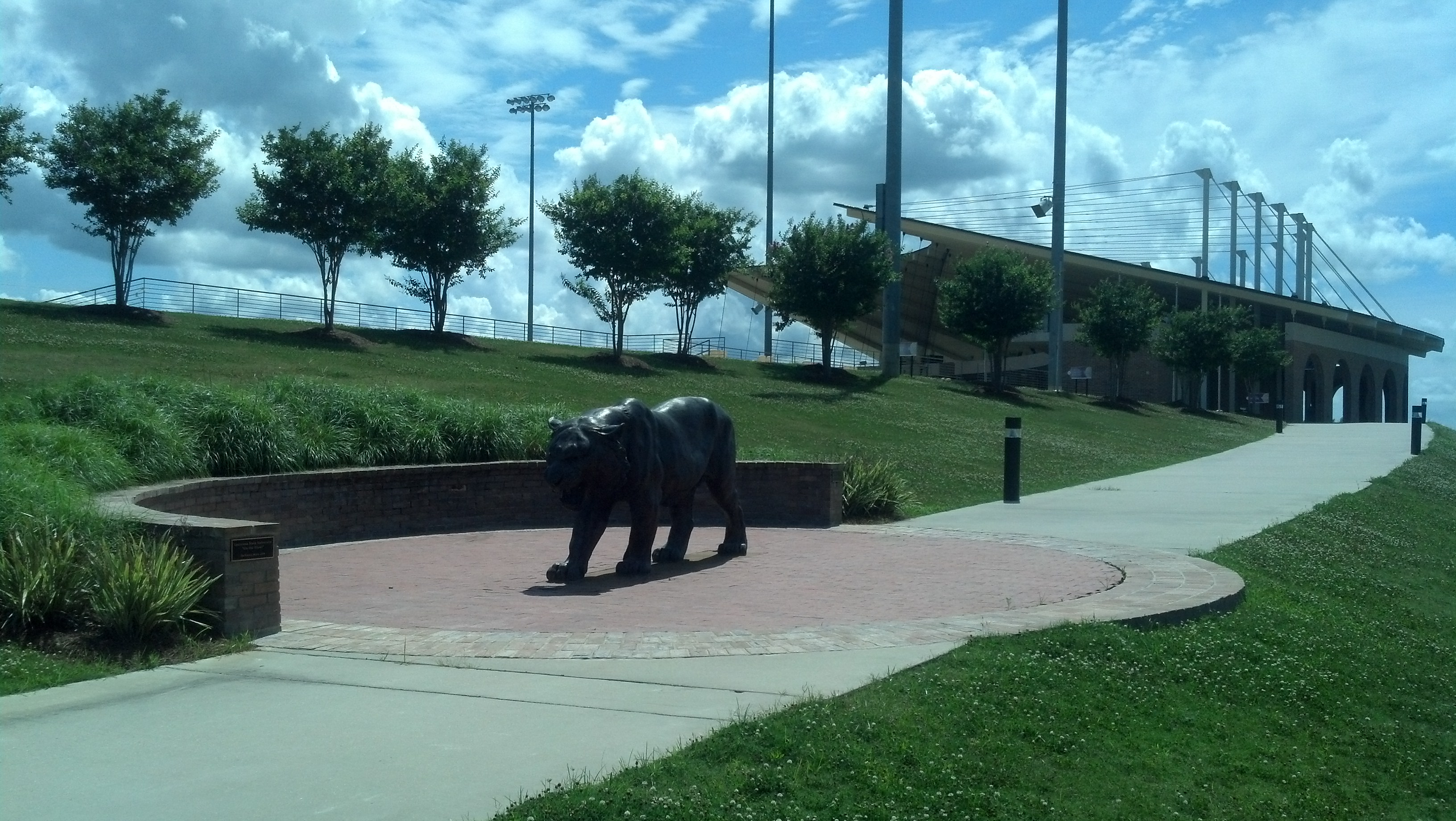
- Tiger Park, Mike the Tiger Statue
- Interactive map of Tiger Park
- Address: 80 Tiger Park Lane; Baton Rouge, Louisiana 70803; United States
- Location: Campus of Louisiana State University
- Owner: Louisiana State University
- Operator: LSU Athletics Department
- Capacity: 1,289 (2,671 including 1,200+ Tiger Park Terrace Seats)
- Executive suites: 1
- Type: Stadium
- Event: Sporting Events
- Surface: Natural Grass
- Scoreboard: One in right field One over home plate press box
- Record attendance: 3,242
- Field size: L - 200, C - 220, R - 200
- Field shape: Softball diamond
- Acreage: 3.94
- Parking: Free asphalt paved and gravel lots

Construction
- Groundbreaking: 2007
- Opened: 2009
- Cost: $12 million
- Architect: Trahan Architects

Tenant
- LSU Tigers softball (NCAA) (2009-present)

Tiger Park is a softball stadium located on the campus of Louisiana State University in Baton Rouge, Louisiana. It serves as the home field of the LSU Lady Tigers softball team and is located south of Skip Bertman Drive across from the LSU School of Veterinary Medicine. The official capacity of the stadium is 2,671 people. Tiger Park's record attendance of 3,242 came on March 25, 2016, in a game versus the University of Florida. The stadium also features an outfield berm, renamed the Tiger Park Terrace in 2016, that can accommodate in excess of 1,200 fans. The stadium opened prior to the 2009 college softball season.

In 2010, Tiger Park was rated the fifth-best architecture building on LSU's campus by the LSU Faculty Senate Monthly Newsletter. According to the newsletter, it is described as

"Best seen at night, when its gables and overhang seem to brighten into a shimmering white sails winging through cool ebony skies, the softball stadium shows that LSU can come up with a building that plays to something other than the local taste for plantation imagery and Greco-Roman bric-a-brac. Welling out of a hillock in a way that suggests strong shoulders on the brink of swinging a home run, the softball stadium evidences a modest freshness that brings a smile and popcorn and hot dogs."

In 2013, Tiger Park was honored with the prestigious Field of the Year award by the Sports Turf Managers Association (STMA) for the college and university softball division. Tiger Park hosted the 2015 SEC softball tournament and 2015 NCAA Division I Regional.

In terms of official capacity, Tiger Park is the fourth largest softball stadium in the Southeastern Conference.

== Program Records at Tiger Park ==
=== Old Tiger Park (1992-2008), New Tiger Park (2009-Present) ===
Year	Overall	PCT	Notes
1997	27-4	.871	
1998	28-2	.871	
1999	30-3	.909	Hosted NCAA Regional
2000	31-4	.886	Hosted NCAA Regional
2001	29-1	.967	Hosted NCAA Regional
2002	28-3	.903	
2003	29-6	.829	
2004	21-7	.750	
2005	21-8	.724	
2006	34-3	.919	Hosted NCAA Regional
2007	30-4	.882	
2008	30-6	.833	Hosted NCAA Regional, SEC Tournament
Total	338-51	.869	5 NCAA Regionals, 1 SEC Tournament
Year	Overall	PCT	Notes
2009	19-8-1	.696	
2010	31-5	.861	Hosted NCAA Regional
2011	21-6	.777	
2012	24-7	.774	
2013	26-6	.813	Hosted NCAA Regional
2014	19-11	.679	
2015	38-5	.884	Hosted NCAA Regional, NCAA Super Regional, SEC Tournament
2016	31-9	.775	Hosted NCAA Regional
2017	31-6	.839	Hosted NCAA Regional
2018	35-4	.897	Hosted NCAA Regional
2019	29-9	.763	Hosted NCAA Regional
2020	18-0	1.000	Season cut short by Covid Pandemic
2021	22-12	.647	Stadium operated at reduced capacity due to continued Covid Pandemic; Hosted NCAA Regional, NCAA Super Regional
2022	23-9	.719	
2023	27-9	.750	Hosted NCAA Regional
2024	31-7	.816	Hosted NCAA Regional
2025	42-16	.724	Hosted NCAA Regional
2026	37-17	.685	Hosted NCAA Regional
2027			Scheduled to host SEC Tournament
Total	394-106-1	.787	9 NCAA Regionals, 2 NCAA Super Regional, 1 SEC Tournament
Total	Record	PCT	Notes
27 seasons	732-156-1	.824	14 NCAA Regionals, 2 NCAA Super Regionals, 2 SEC Tournaments

=== Year-by-Year Attendance in the New Tiger Park ===
Year	Total	Dates	Average	Head Coach
2009	33,133	28	1,183	Yvette Girouard
2010	42,686	36	1,185	Yvette Girouard
2011	33,694	27	1,247	Yvette Girouard
2012	38,145	31	1,230	Beth Torina
2013	46,354	32	1,448	Beth Torina
2014	42,979	30	1,432	Beth Torina
2015	57,090	35	1,631	Beth Torina
2016	75,094	40	1,877	Beth Torina
2017	49,817	28	1,779	Beth Torina
2018	53,310	36	1,481	Beth Torina
2019	56,839	36	1,578	Beth Torina
2020	25,793	17	1,517	Beth Torina
2021	32,601	32	1,018	Beth Torina
2022	64,741	32	2,023	Beth Torina
2023	-	-	-	Beth Torina
2024	-	-	-	-
Total	638,331	432	1,478	-

== Gallery ==
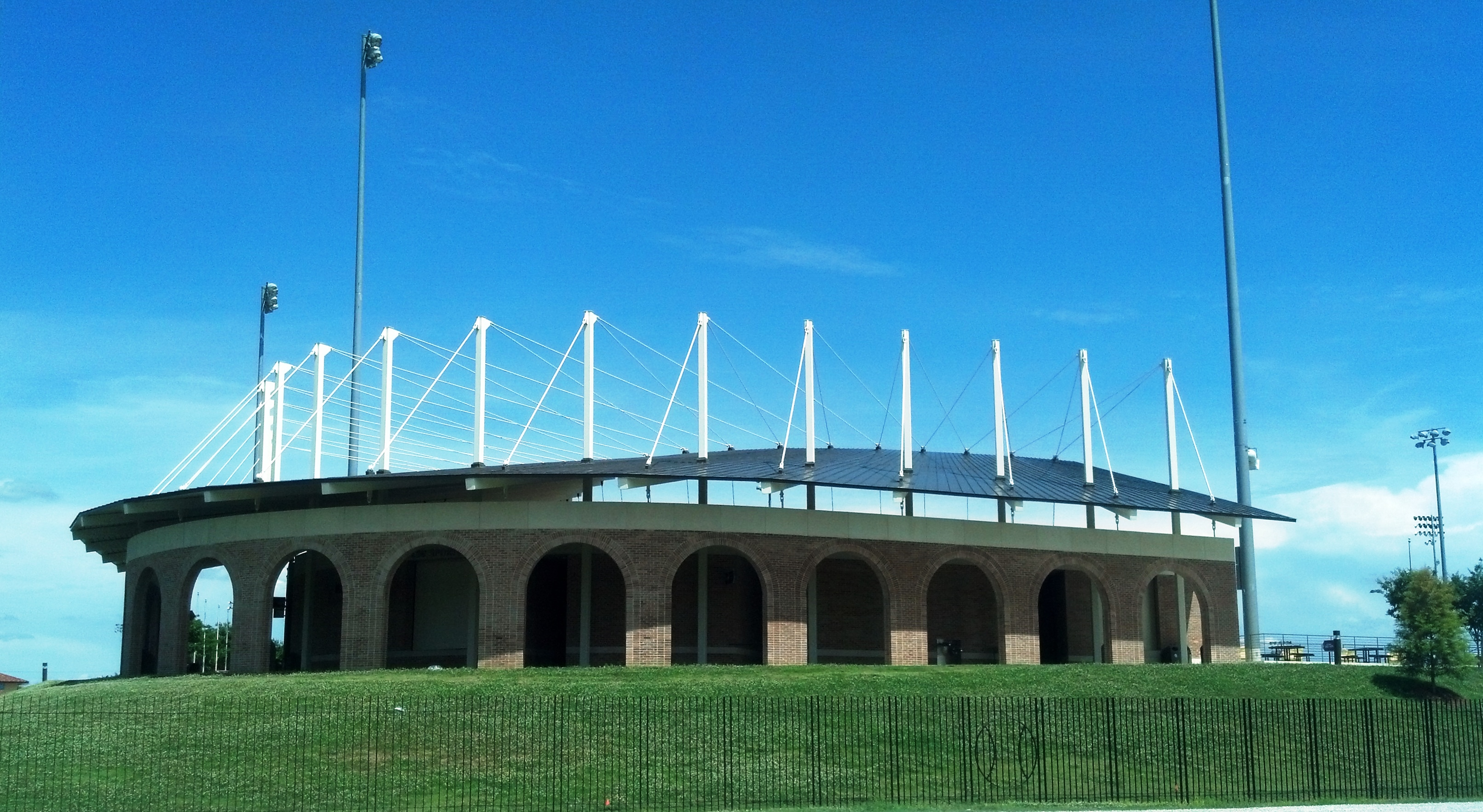
Tiger Park

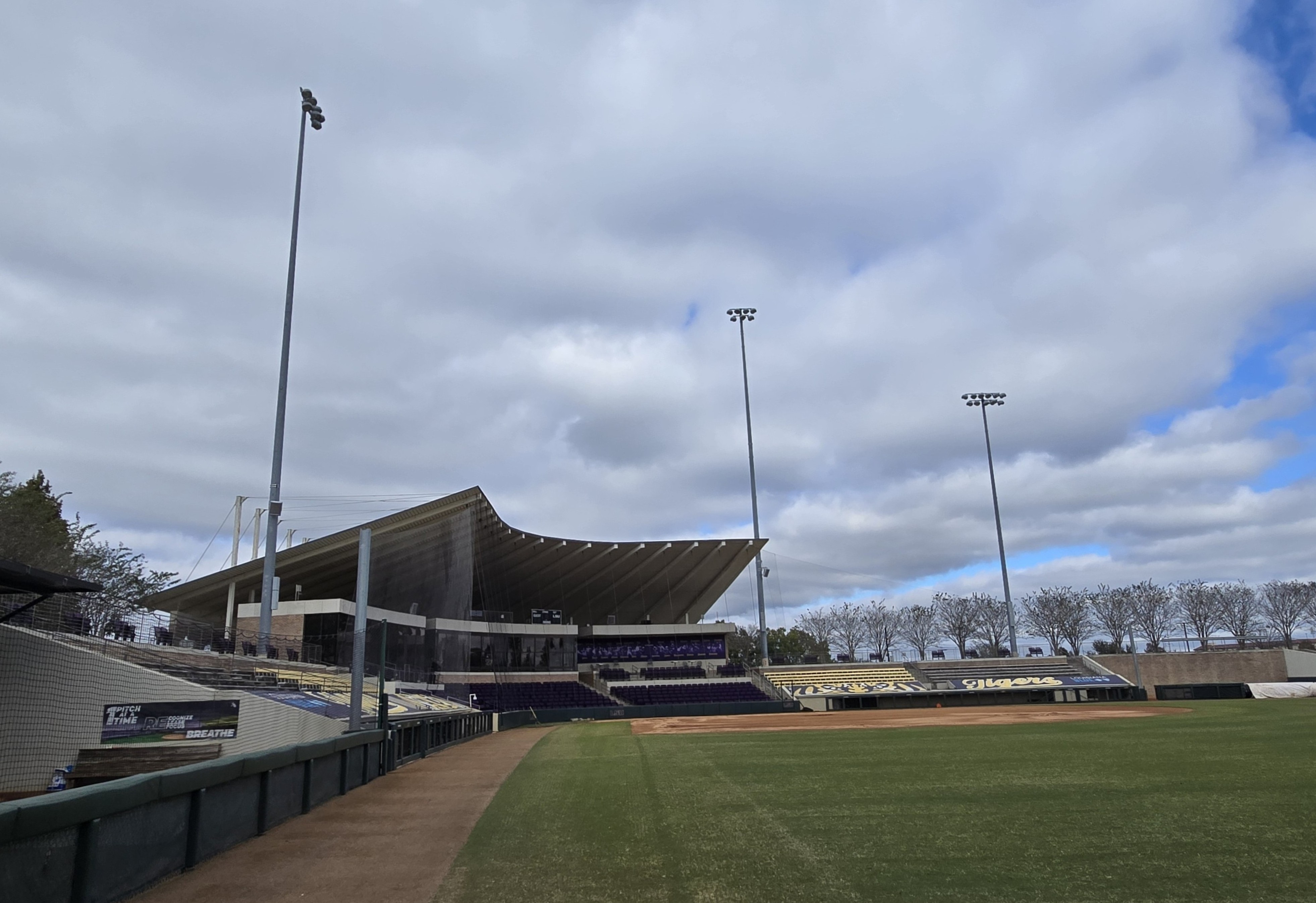
Tiger Park, Grandstand

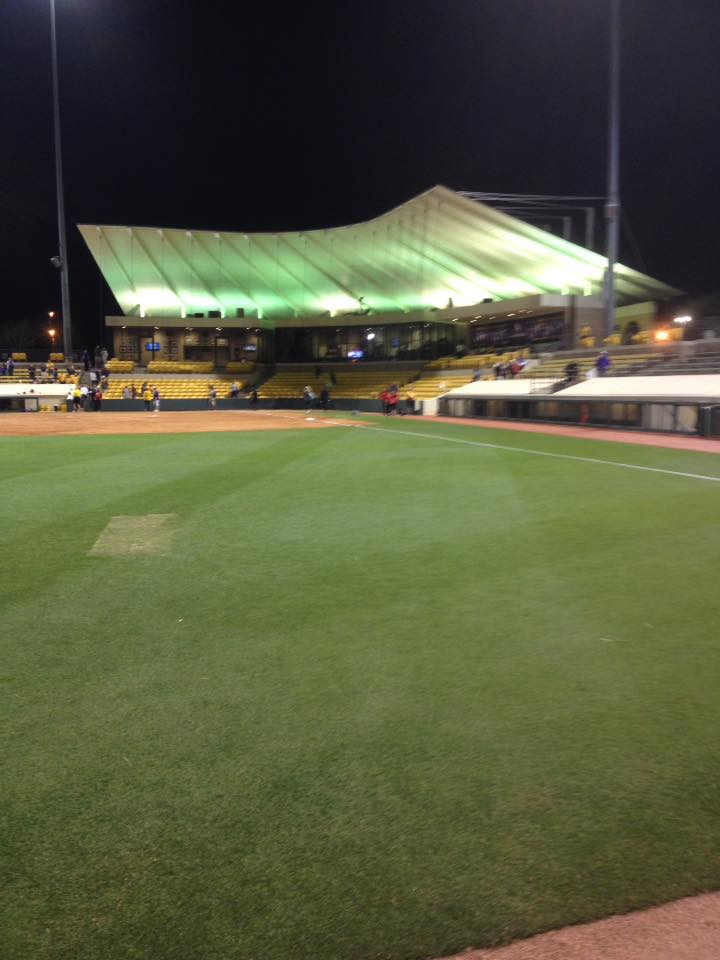
Tiger Park, Grandstand at Night

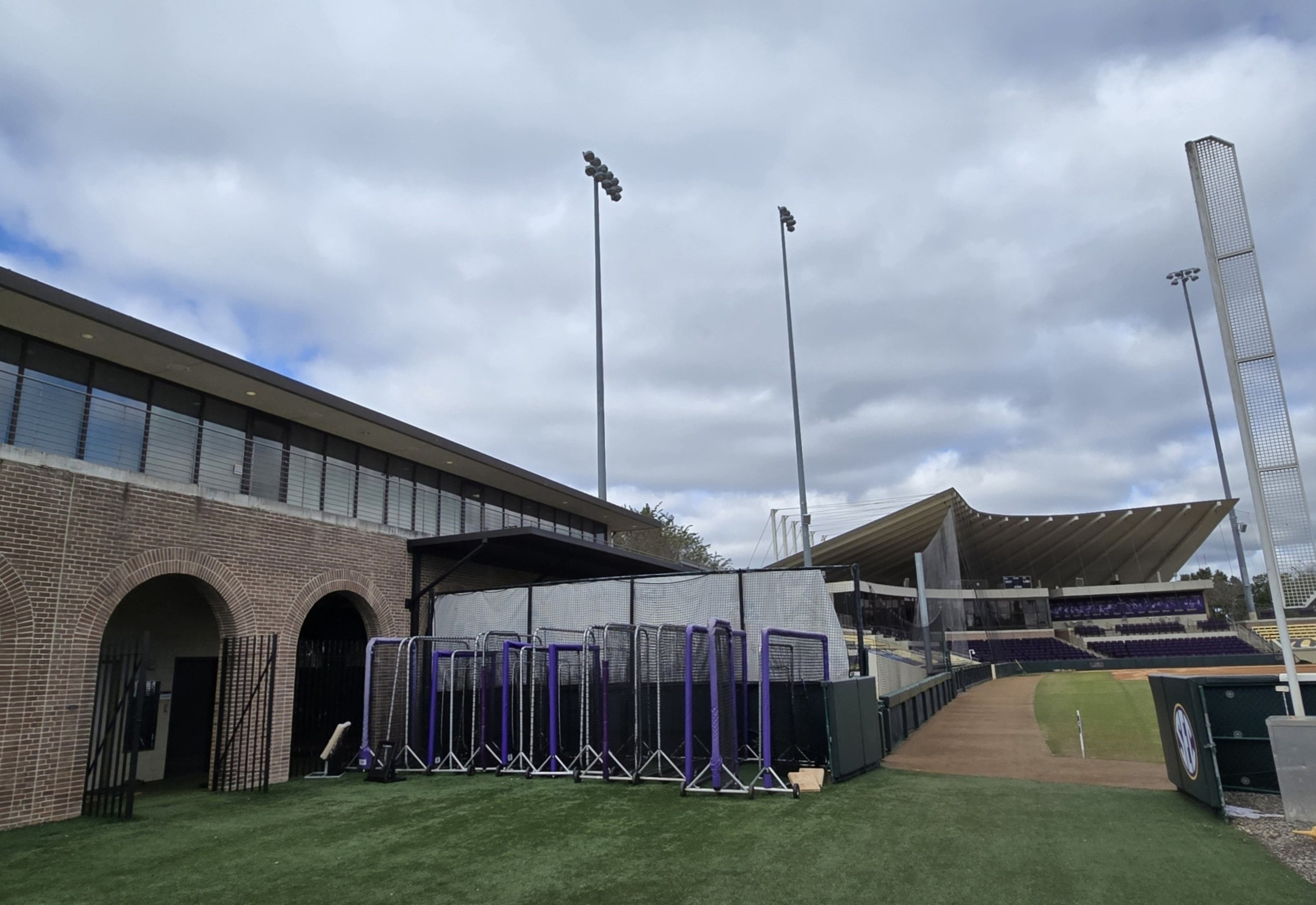
Tiger Park, Clubhouse and Grandstand

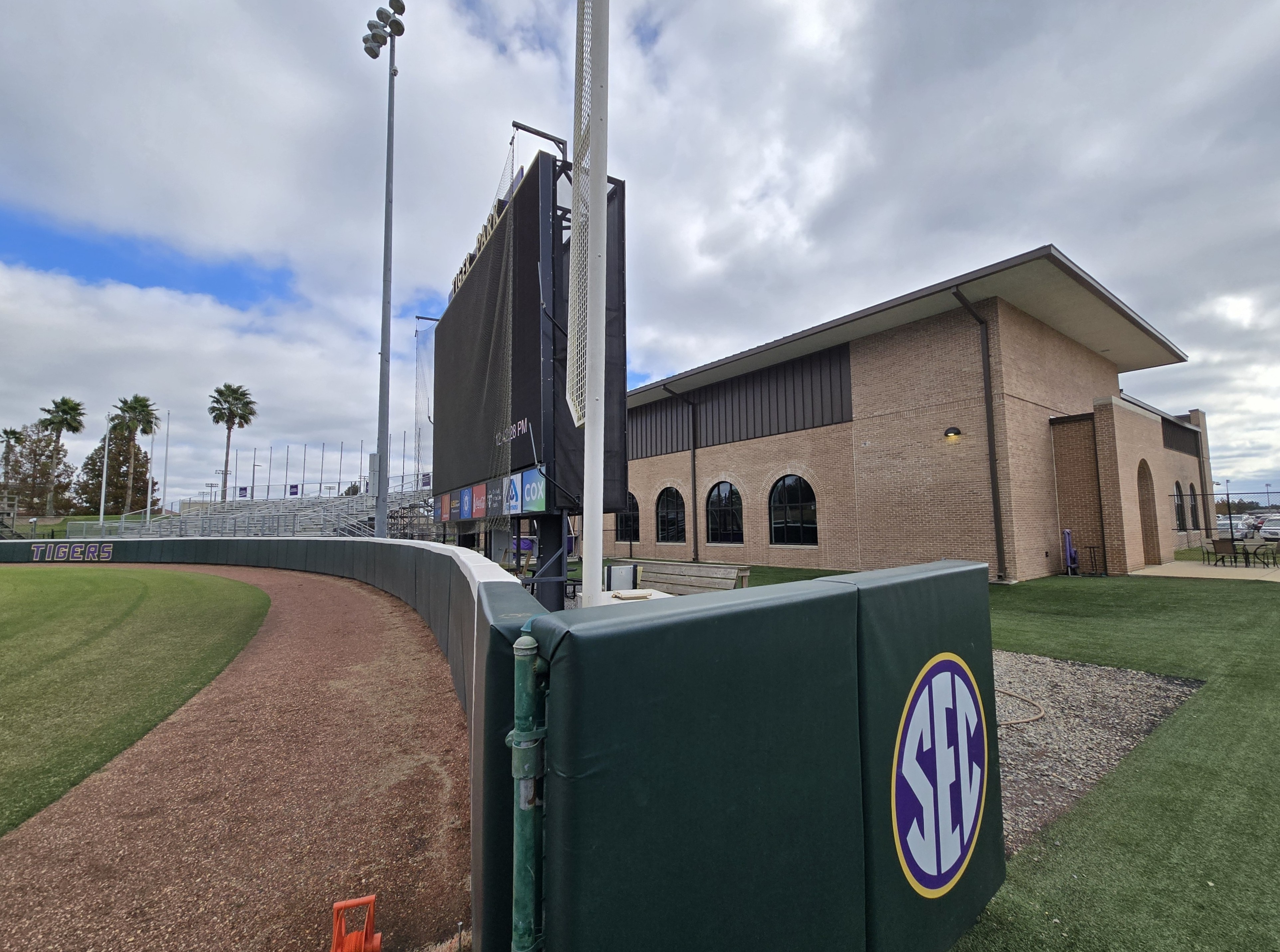
Tiger Park, Mike Moore Performance Center

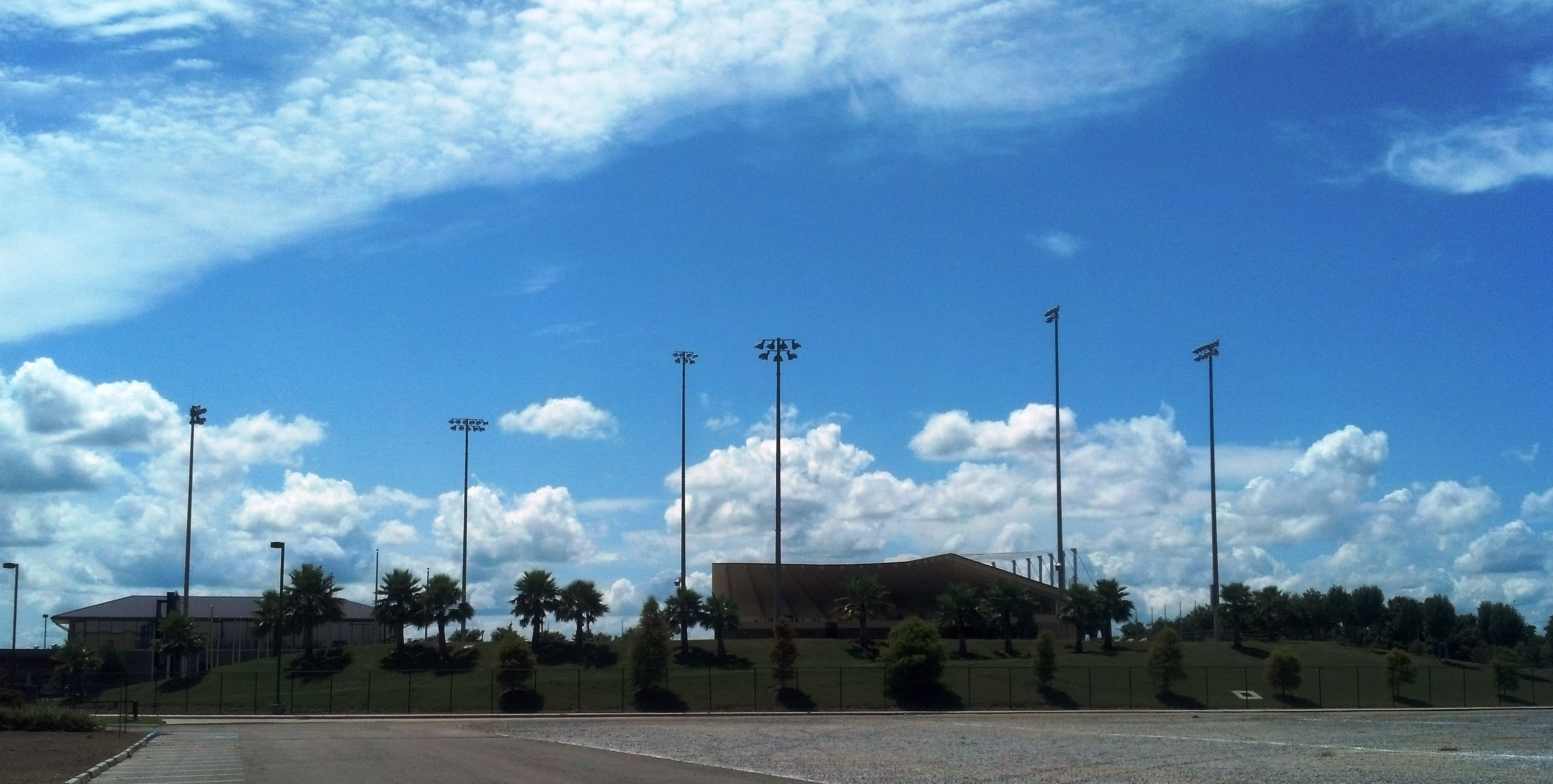
Tiger Park, Outfield Berm

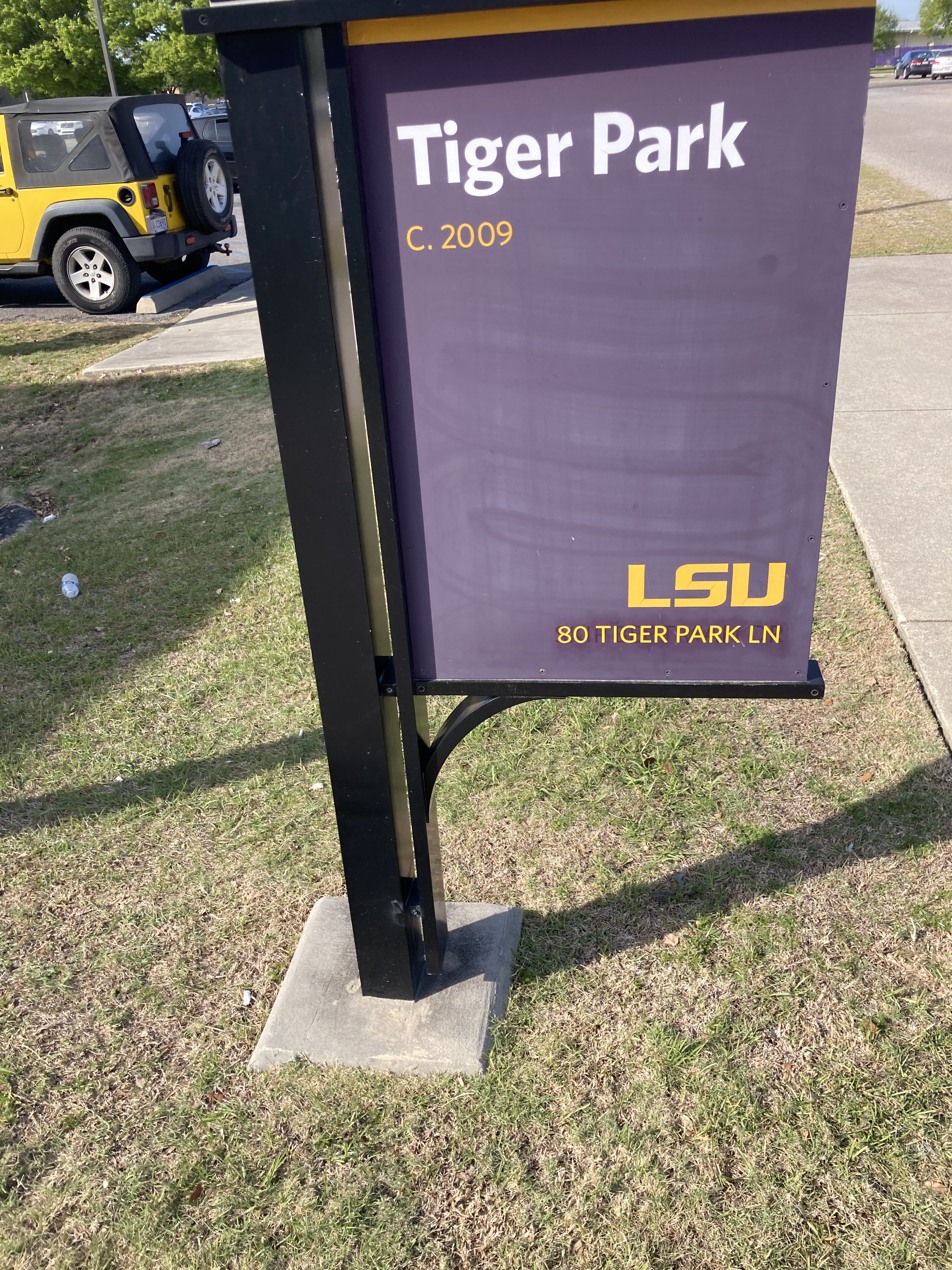
Tiger Park, Signage

== See also ==
- Tiger Park (1997)
- LSU Tigers softball
- LSU Tigers and Lady Tigers
