= Tiger Park (1997) =

Softball stadium in Baton Rouge, Louisiana

Coordinates: 30°25′02.03″N 91°11′04.56″W

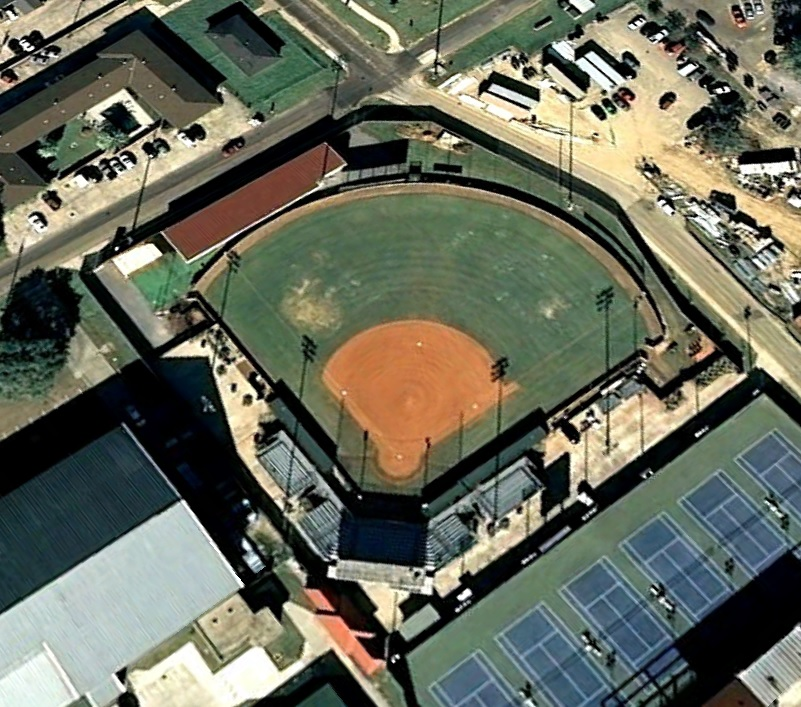
- Aerial photo of old LSU Tiger Park softball stadium
- Interactive map of Tiger Park
- Location: Baton Rouge, Louisiana, United States
- Owner: Louisiana State University
- Operator: LSU Athletics Department
- Capacity: 1,000
- Surface: Natural Grass
- Field size: L - 200, C - 220, R - 200

Construction
- Opened: 1997
- Closed: 2008
- Demolished: 2012

Tenant
- LSU Lady Tigers softball (NCAA)

The original Tiger Park was a softball stadium located on the campus of Louisiana State University in Baton Rouge, Louisiana. The stadium was located on the southwest corner of West Chimes Street and Alaska Street. It served as the home field of the LSU Tigers softball team from 1997 to 2008. The official capacity of the stadium was 1,000 people, however, the stadium held more than that when important rivals came to town or during post-season tournaments. The largest crowd to see a game in the original Tiger Park was on April 28, 2007, when LSU hosted Tennessee before a crowd of 2,326.

The stadium was opened prior to the 1997 college softball season and played host to four NCAA regionals in 1999, 2000, 2001, and 2006 and hosted the 2008 SEC softball tournament. The 2008 season was the twelfth and final season in the original Tiger Park. LSU closed out the original Tiger Park with a home record of 331–51, including 140–34 in the SEC and 1–1 in the SEC Tournament.

== See also ==
- Tiger Park
- LSU Lady Tigers softball
- LSU Tigers and Lady Tigers
