= Cathy Compton =

American softball coach

Current position
- Title: Head coach

Coaching career (HC unless noted)
- 1987–1990: Eureka College
- 1991–1995: Nicholls State
- 1997–1998: LSU

Head coaching record
- Overall: 412–143–4 (.741)

Accomplishments and honors

Championships
- As head coach: 3× Southland Conference regular season (1992, 1994, 1995); 2× SEC West Division

Cathy Compton is the former head softball coach at LSU, Nicholls State and Eureka College. She had an overall record of 412–143–4 (.741).

Born in Binghamton, New York, Compton graduated from the State University of New York at Cortland, where she lettered in basketball and softball.

== Coaching career ==
=== LSU ===
Compton led the LSU Tigers softball team from 1997 to 1998 after the program was revived after 16 years. Compton posted a 100–26 (.797) overall record at LSU, including a 41–12 (.774) record in SEC play. She won two SEC Western Division championships and advanced to the NCAA Regional in 1998.

=== Nicholls State ===
Compton was also head coach of the Nicholls State Colonels softball team from 1991 to 1995. She had an overall record of 200–80–4 (.711).

=== Eureka College ===
Compton's first head coaching job was at Eureka College from 1987 to 1990.
