= 2012 Louisiana–Lafayette Ragin' Cajuns softball team =

American college softball season

2012 Louisiana–Lafayette Ragin' Cajuns softball

Tempe Super Regional Appearance Lafayette Regionals champions Sun Belt Conference regular-season champions

Mardi Gras Invitational Champions NFCA Leadoff Classic Champions Ragin' Cajun Invitational Champions Judi Garman Classic Champions
- Conference: Sun Belt Conference

Ranking
- Coaches: No. 12
- Record: 53–6 (21–3 SBC)
- Head coach: Michael Lotief (12th season); Stefni Lotief (13th season)
- Home stadium: Lamson Park

2012 Sun Belt Conference softball standings
	Conf.				Overall
Team	W		L	PCT	W		L	PCT
No. 12 Louisiana–Lafayette ‍†‍‍^{y}	21	–	3	.875	53	–	6	.898
South Alabama ‍‍‡‍^{y}	17	–	7	.708	41	–	17	.707
FIU ‍‍‍	15	–	9	.625	28	–	27	.509
North Texas ‍‍‍	13	–	10	.565	28	–	26	.519
Western Kentucky ‍‍‍	11	–	12	.478	33	–	25	.569
Troy ‍‍‍	10	–	14	.417	31	–	24	.564
Louisiana–Monroe ‍‍‍	9	–	15	.375	25	–	26	.490
Florida Atlantic ‍‍‍	5	–	18	.217	15	–	39	.278
Middle Tennessee ‍‍‍	5	–	18	.217	16	–	33	.327
† – Conference champion ‡ – Tournament champion y – Invited to the NCAA tournament As of May 20, 2019; Rankings from

The 2012 Louisiana–Lafayette Ragin' Cajuns softball team represented the University of Louisiana at Lafayette in the 2012 NCAA Division I softball season. The Ragin' Cajuns played their home games at Lamson Park and were led by twelfth and thirteen year husband and wife head coach duo Michael and Stefni Lotief, respectively. This was the final season that the Cajuns had two head coaches as after the season, Stefni Lotief decided to resign to focus on family and personal matters.

== Preseason ==
=== Sun Belt Conference Coaches Poll ===
The Sun Belt Conference Coaches Poll was released on February 3, 2012. Louisiana-Lafayette was picked to finish first in the Sun Belt Conference with 80 votes and 8 first place votes

Coaches poll
Predicted finish	Team	Votes (1st place)
1	Louisiana-Lafayette	80 (8)
2	South Alabama	64
3	Florida Atlantic	62
4	FIU	49
5	Troy	40
5	Western Kentucky	40 (1)
7	North Texas	29
8	Louisiana-Monroe	26
9	Middle Tennessee	15

=== Preseason All-Sun Belt team ===
- Taylor Fawbush (FAU, JR, Pitcher)
- Hannah Campbell (USA, SO, Pitcher)
- Karavin Drew (WKU, JR, Catcher)
- Hayden Gann (TROY, SR, 1st Base)
- Lisa Johnson (UNT, SR, 2nd Base)
- Nerissa Myers (ULL, JR, Shortstop)
- Nikki Hollett (TROY, SR, 3rd Base)
- Ashley McClain (FIU, SR, Outfield)
- Katie Smith (ULL, SR, Outfield)
- Brittany Fowler (USA, JR, Outfield)
- Christi Orgeron (ULL, SR, Utility

==== Sun Belt Preseason Player of the Year ====
- Christi Orgeron (ULL

== Roster ==
2012 Louisiana-Lafayette Ragin' Cajuns roster
Pitchers: 00 Ashley Brignac - Senior; 4 Shelbee Rodgers - Sophomore; 7 Jordan Wallace - Freshman; 16 Christina Hamilton - Sophomore; 22 Maggie Ham - Freshman; 30 Prophet Gaspard - Sophomore; 32 Allie Chenault - Sophomore; Utility Players: 3 Natalie Fernandez - Sophomore; 5 Megan Thomas - Freshman; 12 Christi Orgeron - Senior; 17 Callie Philen - Junior; 19 Marie Hoag - Freshman; 21 Samantha Walsh - Freshman	Catchers: 9 Linzey Cifreo - Freshman; 24 Sarah Draheim - Junior; Infielders: 6 Taylor Meaux - Freshman; 10 Peyton Webb - Freshman; 15 Nerissa Myers - Junior; 27 Matte Haack - Junior; 29 Megan Granger - Senior; 31 Paige Cormier - Senior; Outfielders: 8 Megan Waterman - Junior; 13 Erikka Murphy - Senior; 14 Codi Covington - Freshman; 20 Katie Smith - Senior; 23 Brianna Cherry - Junior; 35 Codi Sullivan - Freshman

=== Coaching staff ===
2012 Louisiana-Lafayette Ragin' Cajuns coaching staff
- Michael Lotief – Co-Head Coach – 12th year
- Stefni Lotief - Co-Head Coach - 13th year

== Schedule and results ==
Legend
	Louisiana-Lafayette win
	Louisiana-Lafayette loss
	Postponement
**Bold**	Louisiana-Lafayette team member

2012 Louisiana–Lafayette Ragin' Cajuns Softball Game Log
Regular season (46-3)

February (12-0)
Date	Opponent	Site/stadium	Score	TV	Overall record	SBC record
Louisiana Classics
Feb. 10	vs. Mississippi Valley State	Lamson Park • Lafayette, LA	Game canceled			
Feb. 10	vs. Rutgers	Lamson Park • Lafayette, LA	Game canceled			
Feb. 11	vs. Rutgers	Lamson Park • Lafayette, LA	**W** 15-1 (5 inn)		1-0	
Feb. 11	vs. No. 24 Tulsa	Lamson Park • Lafayette, LA	**W** 19-4 (6 inn)		2-0	
Feb. 12	vs. Mississippi Valley State	Lamson Park • Lafayette, LA	**W** 21-0 (5 inn)		1-0	
Mardi Gras Invitational
Feb. 17	vs. Northwestern	Lamson Park • Lafayette, LA	**W** 6-4		2–0	
Feb. 17	vs. UTEP	Lamson Park • Lafayette, LA	**W** 11-1 (5 inn)		3-0	
Feb. 18	vs. North Carolina	Lamson Park • Lafayette, LA	Game canceled			
Feb. 18	vs. Northwestern State	Lamson Park • Lafayette, LA	Game canceled			
Feb. 19	vs. Louisiana Tech	Lamson Park • Lafayette, LA	**W** 9-0 (5 inn)		4-0	
Feb. 19	vs. Northwestern State	Lamson Park • Lafayette, LA	**W** 10-0 (6 inn)		5-0	
NFCA Leadoff Classic
Feb. 24	vs. Hofstra	Eddie C. Moore Field • Clearwater, FL	**W** 5-4		6-0	
Feb. 24	vs. Mississippi State	Eddie C. Moore Field • Clearwater, FL	**W** 6-3		7-0	
Feb. 25	vs. Boston University	Eddie C. Moore Field • Clearwater, FL	**W** 5-1		8-0	
Feb. 25	vs. No. 12 Michigan	Eddie C. Moore Field • Clearwater, FL	**W** 10-7		9-0	
Feb. 26	vs. Winthrop	Eddie C. Moore Field • Clearwater, FL	**W** 6-1		10-0	

March (18-1)
Date	Opponent	Site/stadium	Score	TV	Overall record	SBC record
Ragin' Cajun Invitational
Mar. 2	vs. Texas A&M–Corpus Christi	Lamson Park • Lafayette, LA	**W** 3-0		11-0	
Mar. 3	vs. Kentucky	Lamson Park • Lafayette, LA	**W** 5-4		12-0	
Mar. 3	vs. Nicholls State	Lamson Park • Lafayette, LA	**W** 15-4 (5 inn)		13-0	
Mar. 4	vs. Stephen F. Austin	Lamson Park • Lafayette, LA	**W** 14-3		14-0	
Mar. 4	vs. Texas A&M–Corpus Christi	Lamson Park • Lafayette, LA	**W** 19-1 (5 inn)		15-0	
Mar. 7	at Houston	Lamson Park • Lafayette, LA	**W** 12-7 (9 inn)		16-0	
Mar. 7	at Houston	Lamson Park • Lafayette, LA	**W** 3-2		17-0	
Mar. 10	North Texas	Lamson Park • Lafayette, LA	**W** 7-6 (10 inn)		18-0	1-0
Mar. 10	North Texas	Lamson Park • Lafayette, LA	**W** 5-4 (9 inn)		19-0	2-0
Mar. 11	North Texas	Lamson Park • Lafayette, LA	**W** 11-4		20-0	3-0
Mar. 13	McNeese State	Lamson Park • Lafayette, LA	**W** 6-0		21-0	
Judi Garman Classic
Mar. 15	vs. Arizona State	Anderson Family Field • Fullerton, CA	**W** 9-2		22-0	
Mar. 16	vs. Fresno State	Anderson Family Field • Fullerton, CA	**W** 9-1 (5 inn)		23-0	
Mar. 16	vs. Penn State	Anderson Family Field • Fullerton, CA	**W** 5-1		24-0	
Mar. 17	vs. Arizona	Anderson Family Field • Fullerton, CA	Game canceled			
Mar. 17	vs. Iowa	Anderson Family Field • Fullerton, CA	Game canceled			
Mar. 22	Georgia Tech	Lamson Park • Lafayette, LA	**W** 12-11		25-0	
Mar. 22	Georgia Tech	Lamson Park • Lafayette, LA	**W** 10-2 (5 inn)		26-0	
Mar. 24	at Troy	Troy Softball Complex • Troy, AL	**L** 4-9		26-1	3-1
Mar. 24	at Troy	Troy Softball Complex • Troy, AL	**W** 9-1 (5 inn)		27-1	4-1
Mar. 25	at Troy	Troy Softball Complex • Troy, AL	**W** 9-1 (5 inn)		28-1	5-1

April (14-1)
Date	Opponent	Site/stadium	Score	TV	Overall record	SBC record
Apr. 6	South Alabama	Lamson Park • Lafayette, LA	**W** 1-0 (10 inn)		29-1	6-1
Apr. 6	South Alabama	Lamson Park • Lafayette, LA	**W** 2-0		30-1	7-1
Apr. 7	South Alabama	Lamson Park • Lafayette, LA	**W** 3-0		31-1	8-1
Apr. 10	at FIU	FIU Softball Stadium • Miami, FL	**W** 10-5		32-1	9-1
Apr. 10	at FIU	FIU Softball Stadium • Miami, FL	**L** 1-2		32-2	9-2
Apr. 11	at FIU	FIU Softball Stadium • Miami, FL	**W** 6-0		33-2	10-2
Apr. 14	at Middle Tennessee	Lovelace Softball Stadium • Murfreesboro, TN	**W** 8-0 (5 inn)		34-2	11-2
Apr. 14	at Middle Tennessee	Lovelace Softball Stadium • Murfreesboro, TN	**W** 9-1 (5 inn)		35-2	12-2
Apr. 15	at Middle Tennessee	Lovelace Softball Stadium • Murfreesboro, TN	**W** 4-3		36-2	13-2
Apr. 21	Florida Atlantic	Lamson Park • Lafayette, LA	**W** 21-0 (5 inn)	CST	37-2	14-2
Apr. 21	Florida Atlantic	Lamson Park • Lafayette, LA	**W** 10-2 (5 inn)	CST	38-2	15-2
Apr. 22	Florida Atlantic	Lamson Park • Lafayette, LA	**W** 9-1 (6 inn)		39-2	16-2
Apr. 28	at Western Kentucky	WKU Softball Complex • Bowling Green, KY	**W** 4-1		40-2	17-2
Apr. 28	at Western Kentucky	WKU Softball Complex • Bowling Green, KY	**W** 2-1		41-2	18-2
Apr. 29	at Western Kentucky	WKU Softball Complex • Bowling Green, KY	**W** 4-2		42-2	19-2

May (2-1)
Date	Opponent	Site/stadium	Score	TV	Overall record	SBC record
May 5	Louisiana-Monroe	Lamson Park • Lafayette, LA	**L** 2-4		43-3	19-3
May 5	Louisiana-Monroe	Lamson Park • Lafayette, LA	**W** 8-3		44-3	20-3
May 6	Louisiana-Monroe	Lamson Park • Lafayette, LA	**W** 11-4		45-3	21-3

Post-Season (7-3)

SBC tournament (3-0)
Date	Opponent	Site/stadium	Score	TV	Overall record	SBC record
May 9	vs. Florida Atlantic (first round)	FAU Softball Complex • Boca Raton, FL	**W** 7-1		46-3	
May 11	vs. Western Kentucky (quarterfinals)	FAU Softball Complex • Boca Raton, FL	**W** 12-1		47-3	
May 11	vs. North Texas (semifinals)	FAU Softball Complex • Boca Raton, FL	**W** 5-1		48-3	
May 12	vs. South Alabama (championship)	FAU Softball Complex • Boca Raton, FL	**L** 1-3		49-4	

NCAA tournament (4-2)
Date	Opponent	Site/stadium	Score	TV	Overall record	SBC record
Lafayette Regionals
May 18	vs. Mississippi Valley State	Lamson Park • Lafayette, LA	**W** 8-0 (6 inn)		50-4	
May 19	vs. Stanford	Lamson Park • Lafayette, LA	**W** 9-3		51-4	
May 20	vs. Stanford	Lamson Park • Lafayette, LA	**W** 6-2		52-4	
Tempe Super Regionals
May 24	at No. 3 Arizona State	Alberta B. Farrington Softball Stadium • Tempe, AZ	**W** 6-0		53-4	
May 25	at No. 3 Arizona State	Alberta B. Farrington Softball Stadium • Tempe, AZ	**L** 2-9		53-4	
May 25	at No. 3 Arizona State	Alberta B. Farrington Softball Stadium • Tempe, AZ	**L** 0-8 (6 inn)		53-6	

Schedule Source:

== Lafayette Regional ==
Lafayette Regional Teams
(1) Louisiana–Lafayette Ragin' Cajuns	(2) Stanford Cardinal	(3) Baylor Lady Bears	(4) Mississippi Valley State Devilettes

First Round
14	Louisiana–Lafayette	8
Mississippi Valley State	0
Stanford	1
Baylor	0
Lower round 1
Mississippi Valley State	0
Baylor	5

Semi-finals
14	Louisiana–Lafayette	9
Stanford	3
Lower final
Stanford	6
Baylor	2

Finals
14	Louisiana–Lafayette	6	–
Baylor	2	–

== Tempe Super Regional ==
Tempe Super Regional Teams
(1) Arizona State Sun Devils	(2) Louisiana–Lafayette Ragin' Cajuns

Game 1
Rank	Team	Score
14	Louisiana–Lafayette	6
3	Arizona State	0

Game 2
Rank	Team	Score
14	Louisiana–Lafayette	2
3	Arizona State	9

Game 3
Rank	Team	Score
14	Louisiana–Lafayette	0
3	Arizona State	8
