= Levine-Fricke Field =

Softball stadium in California, United States

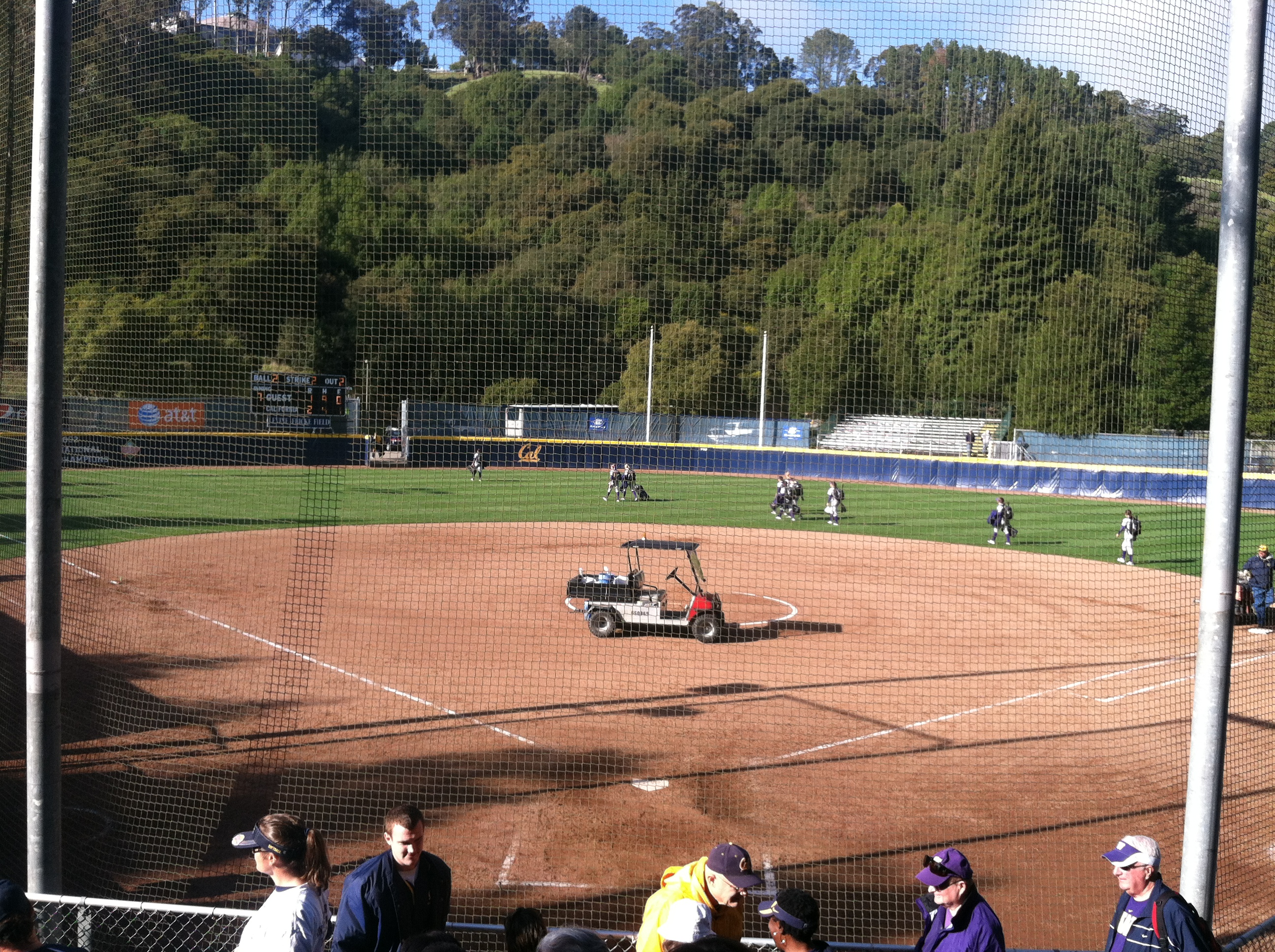
- Levine-Fricke Field in 2012
- Interactive map of Levine-Fricke Field
- Location: University of California; Berkeley, California; United States
- Coordinates: 37°52′18″N 122°14′51″W
- Owner: University of California
- Operator: University of California
- Capacity: 1,204
- Surface: Natural Grass (1995–); Dirt: cinder/clay
- Field size: Corners: 190' (58 m); Center: 220' (67 m)

Construction
- Opened: 1995

Tenants
- California Golden Bears (NCAA); 1995–present

Website
- CalBears.com

Levine-Fricke Field is a college softball stadium in Berkeley, California, on the campus of the University of California. Opened in 1995, it is the home field of the California Golden Bears of the Pac-12, with a seating capacity of 1,204. Levine-Fricke Field is located in the Strawberry Canyon just east of California Memorial Stadium and Witter Rugby Field.

== History ==
The California softball program opened Levine-Fricke Field in 1995 after playing at Hearst Field (now the Hearst Field Annex) and Strawberry Field (now Witter Rugby Field) and has seen a great deal of success since the facility opened. Since 1995, California has won a national championship (2002), a conference championship (2005), made nine Women's College World Series appearances, and has made the NCAA tournament every year since then.

Since the 2000 season, Levine-Fricke Field has seen an average attendance figure of around 300 (around 47,000 total over a span of around 160 games) with the largest single game attendance figure of 1,069 (88.8% capacity) recorded on April 29, 2012 in a game against UCLA (the previous record was 969, which was set in a game against Arizona in 2004). The 2004 season saw Cal softball's best single season attendance average of around 400 (80% capacity); however, it is likely that once the 2012 season ends, it will surpass the 2002 season (2012 average as of April 29 is around 440). California generally sees its largest crowds for their Saturday and Sunday games because all games (both weekday and weekend) are played during the day with first pitch usually scheduled between 12:00p and 3:00p Pacific Time.

The facility opened in 1995 and originally had a capacity of 500 seats and about 600-700 with standing room only. Despite being a fairly new stadium, Levine-Fricke Field does not have lights to support night softball games and up until the opening of the Simpson Center in 2011, the softball program's locker rooms and training facilities were woefully out of date. Other than the addition of the Simpson Center near Memorial Stadium, Levine-Fricke Field itself has also seen some changes in 2012: the athletic department on April 11, 2012 announced that it had added 704 new bleacher seats to the stadium, which more than doubled its capacity, bringing it up to 1,204 from just 500. On May 13, 2012, it was announced that Levine-Fricke Field would host postseason action for the first time in the venue's history. To bring the stadium up to NCAA standards, California brought in a temporary press box structure and temporary lights to accommodate night games and large television crews.

== Future ==
Despite the fact that the California softball program has been one of the more successful programs in the country, and earning a national seed on many different occasions in the past, the Bears hosted NCAA tournament games in 2012 for the first time since the 1993 season (the team then played at Strawberry Field). The main reason for this, is that Levine-Fricke Field is not considered up to NCAA standards because of its inability to host television crews and have night games. To remedy this problem in 2012, California brought in temporary upgrades to the facility for the Berkeley Regional and Super Regional. Because of the new Pac-12 Network, it is quite possible that California will have a more permanent solution to many of the venue's problems in the near future.
