= Jackie Traina =

American softball player

Personal information
- Born: November 5, 1991 (age 34) Naples, Florida, U.S.
- Height: 5 ft 11 in (1.80 m)

Sport
- Country: USA
- Sport: Softball
- College team: Alabama Crimson Tide

Jaclyn Traina (born November 5, 1991) is an American former collegiate four-time All-American softball pitcher.

== Career ==
She attended Naples High School in the city. She later attended the University of Alabama, where she was a starting pitcher for the Alabama Crimson Tide softball team in the Southeastern Conference, leading them to the 2012 Women's College World Series title. Traina was named the 2012 Women's College World Series Most Outstanding Player. She currently ranks in several career records for the school. She also ranks for the conference and the NCAA Division I for numerous softball categories. Traina also played for Team USA softball and later coached for Dartmouth College.

== Career statistics ==
YEAR	W	L	GP	GS	CG	SHO	SV	IP	H	R	ER	BB	SO	ERA	WHIP
2011	19	5	37	23	10	3	4	156.1	112	54	38	50	190	1.70	1.04
2012	42	3	48	43	37	7	2	288.2	196	96	77	109	361	1.87	1.06
2013	19	8	36	31	20	5	1	199.2	159	84	71	95	214	2.49	1.27
2014	26	5	37	33	22	6	3	219.0	163	78	65	75	211	2.08	1.08
TOTALS	106	21	158	130	89	21	10	863.2	630	312	251	329	976	2.03	1.11

YEAR	G	AB	R	H	BA	RBI	HR	3B	2B	TB	SLG	BB	SO	SB	SBA
2011	58	130	23	45	.346	45	13	0	5	89	.684%	29	37	0	0
2012	60	119	26	38	.319	37	10	1	7	77	.647%	29	31	2	2
2013	51	117	23	39	.333	45	13	0	4	82	.701%	24	21	0	0
2014	48	68	10	19	.279	9	2	0	1	26	.382%	16	18	0	0
TOTALS	217	434	82	141	.325	136	38	1	17	274	.631%	98	107	2	2
