= Carol Smith (softball) =

American softball coach

Current position
- Title: Head coach

Biographical details
- Education: Southeastern Louisiana University

Coaching career (HC unless noted)
- 1979–1981: LSU

Head coaching record
- Overall: 45–28–0 (.616)

Carol Smith is the former head softball coach at LSU. She was the first head coach in program history and had an overall record of 45–28–0 (.616).

== Coaching career ==
=== LSU ===
Smith led the LSU Tigers softball team from 1979 to 1981 until the program was disbanded after the 1981 season. Smith led her teams to a 16–7 record in 1979, 15–9 record in 1980 and 14–12 record in 1981.
