= 2012 NCAA Division I softball tournament =

- Teams: 64
- Finals site: ASA Hall of Fame Stadium; Oklahoma City
- Champions: Alabama (1st title)
- Runner-up: Oklahoma (7th WCWS Appearance)
- Winning coach: Patrick Murphy (1st title)
- MOP: Jackie Traina (Alabama)

The 2012 NCAA Division I softball tournament was held from May 18 through June 6, 2012 as the final part of the 2012 NCAA Division I softball season. The 64 NCAA Division I college softball teams were selected out of an eligible 284 teams on May 13, 2012. 30 teams were awarded an automatic bid as champions of their conference, and 34 teams were selected at-large by the NCAA Division I Softball Selection Committee. The tournament culminated with eight teams playing in the 2012 Women's College World Series at ASA Hall of Fame Stadium in Oklahoma City.

Alabama won the national title, defeating Oklahoma 2–1 in the best-of-three final to win the program's first national championship, and also the first softball title for any Southeastern Conference school.

== Automatic bids ==
Conference	School
ACC	Georgia Tech
America East	Boston University
Atlantic 10	UMass
Atlantic Sun	Florida Gulf Coast
Big 12	Oklahoma
Big East	Louisville
Big South	Coastal Carolina
Big Ten	Michigan
Big West	Long Beach State
Colonial	Hofstra
Conference USA	Tulsa
Horizon	Valparaiso
Ivy	Harvard
Mid-American	Miami (OH)
Metro Atlantic	Iona
Mid-Eastern	Bethune–Cookman
Missouri Valley	Illinois State
Mountain West	San Diego State
Northeast	Long Island
Ohio Valley	UT Martin
Pac–12	California
Pacific Coast	Portland State
Patriot	Lehigh
SEC	Alabama
Southern	Georgia Southern
Southland	Texas State
SWAC	Mississippi Valley State
Summit	North Dakota State
Sun Belt	South Alabama
WAC	BYU

== National seeds ==
Teams in "italics" advanced to super regionals. Teams in "bold" advanced to Women's College World Series.

1. California
2. Alabama
3. Arizona State
4. Oklahoma
5. Florida
6. Texas
7. Tennessee
8. Texas A&M
9. Missouri
10. Georgia
11. Oregon
12. UCLA
13. Arizona
14. Louisiana–Lafayette
15. Louisville
16. Washington

== Regionals and super regionals ==
=== Berkeley Super Regional ===
First round	Round 2
1	California	8
Iona	0
1	California	2
Arkansas	3
Boston University	2
Arkansas	3
Berkeley Regional
Iona	3
Boston University	4
1	California	8
Boston University	0
16	Washington	2
Harvard	0
16	Washington	2
Texas Tech	0
Texas Tech	6
Maryland	1
Seattle Regional
Harvard	3
Maryland	2
Texas Tech	0
Harvard	2

Regional finals
Arkansas	2	0
1	California	10	7
16	Washington	4	—
Harvard	0	—

Super regionals
1	California	5	2	—
16	Washington	0	0	—

=== Columbia Super Regional ===
First round	Round 2
8	Texas A&M	11
Bethune–Cookman	0
8	Texas A&M	0
LSU	2
LSU	1
Texas State	0
College Station Regional
Bethune–Cookman	3
Texas State	5
8	Texas A&M	7
Texas State	4
9	Missouri	6
Illinois State	0
9	Missouri	1
DePaul	0
UMass	0
DePaul	3
Columbia Regional
Illinois State	1
UMass	0
DePaul	0
Illinois State	3

Regional finals
LSU	2	—
8	Texas A&M	1	—
9	Missouri	2	—
Illinois State	1	—

Super regionals
LSU	6	1	3
9	Missouri	1	5	1

=== Tampa Super Regional ===
Round 1	Round 2
5	Florida	1
Florida Gulf Coast	2
Florida Gulf Coast	3
South Florida	8
South Florida	1
UCF	0
Gainesville Regional
5	Florida	7
UCF	1
5	Florida	6
Florida Gulf Coast	2
12	UCLA	2
Hofstra	7
Hofstra	2
San Diego State	0
Florida State	0
San Diego State	1
Los Angeles Regional
12	UCLA	1
Florida State	2
San Diego State	1
Florida State	0

Regional finals
South Florida	1	—
5	Florida	0	—
Hofstra	2	—
San Diego State	1	—

Super regionals
South Florida	1	2	2
Hofstra	2	1	1

=== Norman Super Regional ===
Round 1	Round 2
4	Oklahoma	19
Lehigh	3
4	Oklahoma	7
Tulsa	1
Oregon State	7
Tulsa	9
Norman Regional
Lehigh	2
Oregon State	9
Tulsa	1
Oregon State	2
13	Arizona	11
North Dakota State	0
13	Arizona	7
Notre Dame	2
Hawaii	3
Notre Dame	7
Tucson Regional
North Dakota State	9
Hawaii	7
Notre Dame	8
North Dakota State	4

Regional finals
4	Oklahoma	6	—
Oregon State	0	—
13	Arizona	8	—
Notre Dame	3	—

Super regionals
4	Oklahoma	6	7	—
13	Arizona	0	1	—

=== Tempe Super Regional ===
Round 1	Round 2
3	Arizona State	9
Long Island	0
3	Arizona State	3
Syracuse	1
Syracuse	4
Long Beach State	2
Tempe Regional
Long Island	4
Long Beach State	5
Syracuse	2
Long Beach State	1
14	Louisiana–Lafayette	8
Mississippi Valley State	0
14	Louisiana–Lafayette	9
Stanford	3
Stanford	1
Baylor	0
Lafayette Regional
Mississippi Valley State	0
Baylor	5
Stanford	6
Baylor	2

Regional finals
3	Arizona State	0	4
Syracuse	1	0
14	Louisiana–Lafayette	6	—
Stanford	2	—

Super regionals
3	Arizona State	0	9	8
14	Louisiana–Lafayette	6	2	0

=== Austin Super Regional ===
Round 1	Round 2
6	Texas	0
Northwestern	2
Northwestern	13
Houston	9
Auburn	1
Houston	2
Austin Regional
6	Texas	6
Auburn	1
Houston	1
6	Texas	10
11	Oregon	7
Portland State	3
11	Oregon	6
BYU	4
BYU	4
Mississippi State	3
Eugene Regional
Portland State	2
Mississippi State	0
BYU	2
Portland State	0

Regional finals
Northwestern	0	0
6	Texas	5	5
11	Oregon	4	—
BYU	1	—

Super regionals
6	Texas	4	4	6
11	Oregon	2	5	10

=== Knoxville Super Regional ===
Round 1	Round 2
7	Tennessee	0
Miami (OH)	1
Miami (OH)	0
Virginia Tech	6
Virginia Tech	4
UAB	1
Knoxville Regional
7	Tennessee	8
UAB	0
Miami (OH)	0
7	Tennessee	8
10	Georgia	13
Coastal Carolina	3
10	Georgia	3
North Carolina	2
North Carolina	2
Georgia Southern	1
Athens Regional
Coastal Carolina	2
Georgia Southern	1
North Carolina	5
Coastal Carolina	3

Regional finals
Virginia Tech	1	2
7	Tennessee	2	10
10	Georgia	2	—
North Carolina	1	—

Super regionals
7	Tennessee	3	0	2
10	Georgia	2	1	0

=== Tuscaloosa Super Regional ===
Round 1	Round 2
2	Alabama	5
UT Martin	1
2	Alabama	5
South Alabama	2
Georgia Tech	3
South Alabama	4
Tuscaloosa Regional
UT Martin	1
Georgia Tech	9
South Alabama	10
Georgia Tech	1
15	Louisville	6
Valparaiso	4
15	Louisville	1
Michigan	2
Michigan	3
Kentucky	2
Louisville Regional
Valparaiso	4
Kentucky	5
15	Louisville	3
Kentucky	2

Regional finals
2	Alabama	6	—
South Alabama	0	—
Michigan	4	—
15	Louisville	0	—

Super regionals
2	Alabama	4	4	—
Michigan	1	3	—

== Women's College World Series ==
=== Participants ===
School	Conference	Record (conference)	Head coach	WCWS appearances† (including 2012 WCWS)	WCWS best finish†	WCWS W–L record† (excluding 2012 WCWS)
Alabama	Southeastern	55–7 (19–6)	Patrick Murphy	8 (last: 2011)	3rd (2008, 2009, 2011)	8–14
Arizona State	Pac-12	51–9 (18–4)	Clint Myers	10 (last: 2011)	1st (2008, 2011)	16–14
California	Pac-12	56–5 (21–3)	Diane Ninemire	12 (last: 2011)	1st (2002)	19–19
LSU	Southeastern	39–23 (15–13)	Beth Torina	3 (last: 2004)	3rd (2001, 2004)	5–4
Oklahoma	Big 12	50–8 (19–5)	Patty Gasso	7 (last: 2011)	1st (2000)	7–10
Oregon	Pac-12	44–16 (16–8)	Mike White	2 (last: 1989)	5th (1989)	1–2
South Florida	Big East	50–12 (17–5)	Ken Erickson	1 (last: – )	– ()	0–0
Tennessee	Southeastern	52–12 (22–6)	Ralph Weekly/ Karen Weekly	5 (last: 2010)	2nd (2007)	12–8

† Excludes results of the pre-NCAA Women's College World Series of 1969 through 1981.

=== Results ===
==== Bracket ====
All times are Central Time Zone

First round
1	California	5
LSU	3
4	Oklahoma	5
South Florida	1
LSU	1
South Florida	0
3	Arizona State	3
11	Oregon	1
2	Alabama	5
7	Tennessee	3
11	Oregon	3
7	Tennessee	1

Second round
1	California	0
4	Oklahoma	3
LSU	0
3	Arizona State	6
3	Arizona State	1
2	Alabama	2
11	Oregon	3
1	California	6

Semifinals
4	Oklahoma	5	—
3	Arizona State	3	—
2	Alabama	5	—
1	California	2	—

Finals
4	Oklahoma	4	6	4
2	Alabama	1	8	5

==== Game results ====
Date	Game	Winner	Score	Loser	Attendance	Notes
May 31, 2012	Game 1	Oklahoma	5–1	South Florida	8,149	Lauren Chamberlain homered in the 4th inning to give Oklahoma the lead in their first WCWS win since 2004.
May 31, 2012	Game 2	California	5–3	LSU	8,149	After falling behind 2–0, Cal rallied and finally took the lead with a 3-run 6th inning.
May 31, 2012	Game 3	Alabama	5–3	Tennessee	8,235	Alabama took control early with 4 runs in the 1st inning en route to Jackie Traina's 38th victory of the season, tying the school's single-season mark.
May 31, 2012	Game 4	Arizona State	3–1	Oregon	8,235	Both pitchers were effective; a costly 2-run error by Oregon was the difference.
June 1, 2012	Game 5	Oklahoma	3–0	California	9,209	Keilani Ricketts struck out 16 batters in a two-hit shutout.
June 1, 2012	Game 6	Alabama	2–1	Arizona State	9,209	An 11-strikeout performance from Jackie Traina and a game-clinching solo home run in the 6th inning from senior Amanda Locke propelled Alabama to their fourth straight semifinals. With the victory, Traina took sole possession of Alabama's single-season record for wins.
June 2, 2012	Game 7	LSU	1–0	South Florida	8,504	LSU's A.J. Andrews scored the game's only run on a sacrifice popup to the shortstop.
June 2, 2012	Game 8	Oregon	3–1	Tennessee	8,504	
June 2, 2012	Game 9	Arizona State	6–0	LSU	9,310	ASU's Alix Johnson and Sam Parlich combined for five RBIs.
June 2, 2012	Game 10	California	6–3	Oregon	9,310	
June 3, 2012	Game 11	Oklahoma	5–3	Arizona State		
June 3, 2012	Game 12	Alabama	5–2	California		Jackie Traina, Kaila Hunt and Jazlyn Lunceford each hit solo home runs for Alabama. Alabama scored in every inning except for the first inning.
June 4, 2012	Finals game 1	Oklahoma	4–1	Alabama		
June 5, 2012	Finals game 2	Alabama	8–6	Oklahoma		
June 6, 2012	Finals game 3	Alabama	5–4	Oklahoma		After trailing 3–0, Alabama scored 4 runs in the bottom of the 4th, one before and three after a thirteen-minute rain delay, to take the lead. Alabama wins 2012 WCWS.

==== Championship game ====
School	Top Batter	Stats.
Alabama Crimson Tide	Amanda Locke (DP)	2-3 RBI
Oklahoma Sooners	Lauren Chamberlain (1B)	2-3 3RBIs 2HRs BB

School	Pitcher	IP	H	R	ER	BB	SO	AB	BF
Alabama Crimson Tide	Jackie Traina (W)	7.0	5	4	4	3	6	27	31
Oklahoma Sooners	Keilani Ricketts (L)	6.0	7	5	3	2	7	26	28

==== Final standings ====
Place	School	WCWS record
1st	Alabama	5–1
2nd	Oklahoma	4–2
3rd	California	2–2
3rd	Arizona State	2–2
5th	LSU	1–2
5th	Oregon	1–2
7th	South Florida	0–2
7th	Tennessee	0–2

=== All-Tournament Team ===
- Amber Freeman, Arizona State
- Samantha Pappas, Oregon
- Alexa Peterson, Oregon
- Lauren Chamberlain, Oklahoma
- Destinee Martinez, Oklahoma
- Keilani Ricketts, Oklahoma
- Jessica Shults, Oklahoma
- Brianna Turang, Oklahoma
- Kayla Braud, Alabama
- Jennifer Fenton, Alabama
- Amanda Locke, Alabama
- Jackie Traina, Alabama (Most Valuable Player)

=== Post-series notes ===
Jackie Traina was named the Women's College World Series MVP. Traina pitched 42 innings, surrendering 18 earned runs on 35 hits and 24 walks while striking out 45 to lead Alabama to its first national softball title. It was also the first national softball title for the SEC.
