= LSU Tigers softball =

LSU Tigers Softball
- 2027 LSU Tigers softball team
- Founded: 1979 (46 years ago)
- University: Louisiana State University
- Athletic director: Verge Ausberry
- Head coach: Beth Torina (15th season)
- Conference: SEC
- Location: Baton Rouge, Louisiana, US
- Home stadium: Tiger Park (capacity: 1,289 (1,200 additional seats on the Tiger Park Terrace)
- Nickname: Tigers
- Colors: Purple and gold

NCAA WCWS appearances
- 2001, 2004, 2012, 2015, 2016, 2017

NCAA super regional appearances
- 2006, 2007, 2012, 2015, 2016, 2017, 2018, 2019, 2021, 2024, 2026

NCAA Tournament appearances
- 1998, 1999, 2000, 2001, 2002, 2003, 2004, 2006, 2007, 2008, 2009, 2010, 2011, 2012, 2013, 2014, 2015, 2016, 2017, 2018, 2019, 2021, 2022, 2023, 2024, 2025, 2026

Conference tournament championships
- 1999, 2001, 2002, 2004, 2007

Regular-season conference championships
- 1999, 2000, 2001, 2002, 2004

The LSU Tigers (Note: LSU uses the nickname of "Lady Tigers" only in sports that have both men's and women's teams. Since LSU only sponsors gymnastics, soccer, softball, and volleyball for women, those teams use "Tigers" instead.) softball team represents Louisiana State University in NCAA Division I college softball. The team participates in the Southeastern Conference (SEC) and plays home games in Tiger Park. The team is currently coached by Beth Torina.

== History ==
LSU has won 9 Western Division titles, 5 regular season SEC championships and 5 SEC tournament championships. LSU has also appeared in 6 Women's College World Series and 19 NCAA tournaments. The team has finished 3 at the Women's College World series 4 times (2001, 2004, 2015, 2016) and fifth two times (2012, 2017).

=== Carol Smith era (1979-1981) ===
LSU softball had its beginnings in 1979 with a team coached by Carol Smith. However, after only three seasons, LSU decided to disband its softball program. During Smith's tenure, she coached the team to an overall record of 45–28 (.616).

=== Cathy Compton era (1997-1998) ===
In 1997 the Southeastern Conference decided to begin sponsoring softball, partly to help member institutions to comply with Title IX. LSU softball was reborn with the hiring of Cathy Compton from Nicholls State University. Compton was head coach from 1997 through the 1998 regular season and finished with an overall record of 100–26 (.797) and 41–12 (.774) in the SEC.

=== Glenn Moore era (1999-2000) ===
Glenn Moore became head coach at LSU starting with the 1998 NCAA Tournament. He was head coach at LSU through the 2000 season and compiled a 117–25 (.824) overall record and 53–7 (.883) SEC record.

=== Yvette Girouard era (2001-2011) ===
In 2001, LSU hired NFCA Hall of Fame head coach Yvette Girouard from the University of Louisiana at Lafayette. During her 11 years as head coach, Girouard had an overall record of 526–171–1 (.754) and SEC record of 220–93–1 (.702). She led the Tigers to two College Women's World Series appearances and made the NCAA Tournament in ten of her eleven years as head coach. She coached LSU to three SEC championships (2001, 2002, 2004) and four SEC tournament championships (2001, 2002, 2004, 2007). She retired following the 2011 season.

During Girouard's tenure as head coach, LSU moved into the new Tiger Park during the spring of 2009 after previously playing at the Original Tiger Park that opened in 1997.

=== Beth Torina era (2012-present) ===
On June 9, 2011, LSU announced long-time Alabama head coach Patrick Murphy was hired to replace Yvette Girouard. However, three days later, Murphy announced that he had changed his mind and would remain at Alabama. LSU then hired Beth Torina, head coach at Florida International University (FIU) on June 20, 2011. Torina led the Tigers to the Women's College World Series in her first season as head coach in 2012 and also has led the Tigers to the World Series in 2015, 2016 and 2017.

With Torina as head coach, the program earned its 1,000th victory on May 1, 2016 after defeating the Arkansas Razorbacks 9-1 in Fayetteville, Arkansas.

== Year-by-Year Records ==
Year	Coach	Overall	Conference	Standing	Notes
Independent (1979–1981)
1979	Carol Smith	16–7			
1980	Carol Smith	15–9			
1981	Carol Smith	14–12			
No team fielded from 1982–1996
Southeastern Conference (1997–present)
1997	Cathy Compton	44–14	18–6		SEC Western Division Champions
1998	Cathy Compton (first 68 games); Glenn Moore (last 4 games)	58–14	23–6		SEC Western Division Champions; NCAA Regionals
1999	Glenn Moore	56–10	27–3		SEC Champions; SEC Tournament Champions; NCAA Regionals
2000	Glenn Moore	59–13	26–4		SEC Champions; SEC Tournament Runners-Up; NCAA Regionals
2001	Yvette Girouard	59–11	26–4		SEC Champions; SEC Tournament Champions; Women's College World Series
2002	Yvette Girouard	56–11	25–4		SEC Champions; SEC Tournament Champions; NCAA Regionals
2003	Yvette Girouard	50–18	20–9		SEC Tournament Runners-Up; NCAA Regionals
2004	Yvette Girouard	57–12	22–6		SEC Champions; SEC Tournament Champions; Women's College World Series
2005	Yvette Girouard	31–23	12–18		
2006	Yvette Girouard	55–14	22–8		NCAA Super Regionals
2007	Yvette Girouard	55–12	22–6		SEC Western Division Champions; SEC Tournament Champions; NCAA Super Regionals
2008	Yvette Girouard	44–18	17–11		NCAA Regionals
2009	Yvette Girouard	34–18–1	15–10–1		NCAA Regionals
2010	Yvette Girouard	45–16	20–8		NCAA Regionals
2011	Yvette Girouard	40–18	19–9		NCAA Regionals
2012	Beth Torina	40–25	15–13		Women's College World Series
2013	Beth Torina	42–16	15–8		SEC Western Division Champions; NCAA Regionals
2014	Beth Torina	38–24	13–11		NCAA Regionals
2015	Beth Torina	52–14	15–9		Women's College World Series
2016	Beth Torina	50–16	13–11		Women's College World Series
2017	Beth Torina	48–22	12–12		Women's College World Series
2018	Beth Torina	45–17	13–11		NCAA Super Regionals
2019	Beth Torina	43–19	14–10		NCAA Super Regionals
2020	Beth Torina	21–3	0–0		Tournament cancelled due to COVID-19 pandemic
2021	Beth Torina	35–22	13–11		NCAA Super Regionals
2022	Beth Torina	34–23	13–11		NCAA Regionals
2023	Beth Torina	42–17	13–11		NCAA Regionals
2024	Beth Torina	44–17	12–12		NCAA Super Regionals
2025	Beth Torina	41–14	12–12		
Total		1,363–499–1 (.732)	487–254–1 (.657)		

=== NCAA Tournament seeding history ===
National seeding began in 2005. The LSU Tigers have been a national seed 14 of the 20 tournaments.

Years →	'06	'07	'08	'10	'13	'15	'16	'17	'18	'19	'21	'23	'24	'25	'26
Seeds →	15	10	9	12	9	5	10	13	11	10	7	10	9	10	16

== Awards and honors ==
=== National awards ===
Women's College World Series MVP

- Kristin Schmidt (2004)

NFCA Catcher of the Year

- Killian Roessner (2007)

=== Conference awards ===
SEC Player of the Year

- Ashlee Ducote (2000)
- Britni Sneed (2001)
- Trena Peel (2002)

SEC Pitcher of the Year

- Britni Sneed (2002)

SEC Freshman of the Year

- Rachele Fico (2010)
- Bianka Bell (2013)
- Tori Edwards (2025)

SEC Tournament MVP

- Ashley Lewis (1999)
- Britni Sneed (2001, 2002)
- Kristin Schmidt (2003, 2004)
- Dani Hofer (2007)

=== All-Americans ===
Player	Position	Year(s)	Team
Jodi Otten	2B	1998	3rd Team
Ashlee Ducote	3B	1999, 2000	1st Team, 1st Team
Stephanie Hastings	2B	2000	1st Team
Tara Asbill	SS	2000	3rd Team
Britni Sneed	P	2000, 2001, 2002	2nd Team, 1st Team, 1st Team
Trena Peel	OF	2002	2nd Team
Kristin Schmidt	P	2003, 2004	3rd Team, 2nd Team
LaDonia Hughes	OF	2004	2nd Team
Leslie Klein	OF	2004, 2006, 2007	3rd Team, 3rd Team, 3rd Team
Emily Turner	P	2006,	3rd Team
Killian Roessner	C	2007	1st Team
Kirsten Shortridge	OF	2009, 2010	3rd Team, 1st Team
Brittany Mack	P	2011	3rd Team
Rachele Fico	P	2012, 2013	1st Team, 1st Team
AJ Andrews	OF	2013	3rd Team
Sahvanna Jaquish	DP or UT	2014, 2015, 2016, 2017	2nd Team, 2nd Team, 3rd Team, 1st Team
Bianka Bell	SS, 3B	2015, 2016	1st Team, 3rd Team
Allie Walljasper	P	2015, 2017	3rd Team, 3rd Team
Carley Hoover	P	2015	3rd Team
Bailey Landry	OF	2015, 2017	2nd Team, 1st Team
Amanda Sánchez	3B	2019	2nd Team
Shelbi Sunsieri	UT/P	2019	2nd Team

== Stadiums ==
=== Tiger Park ===
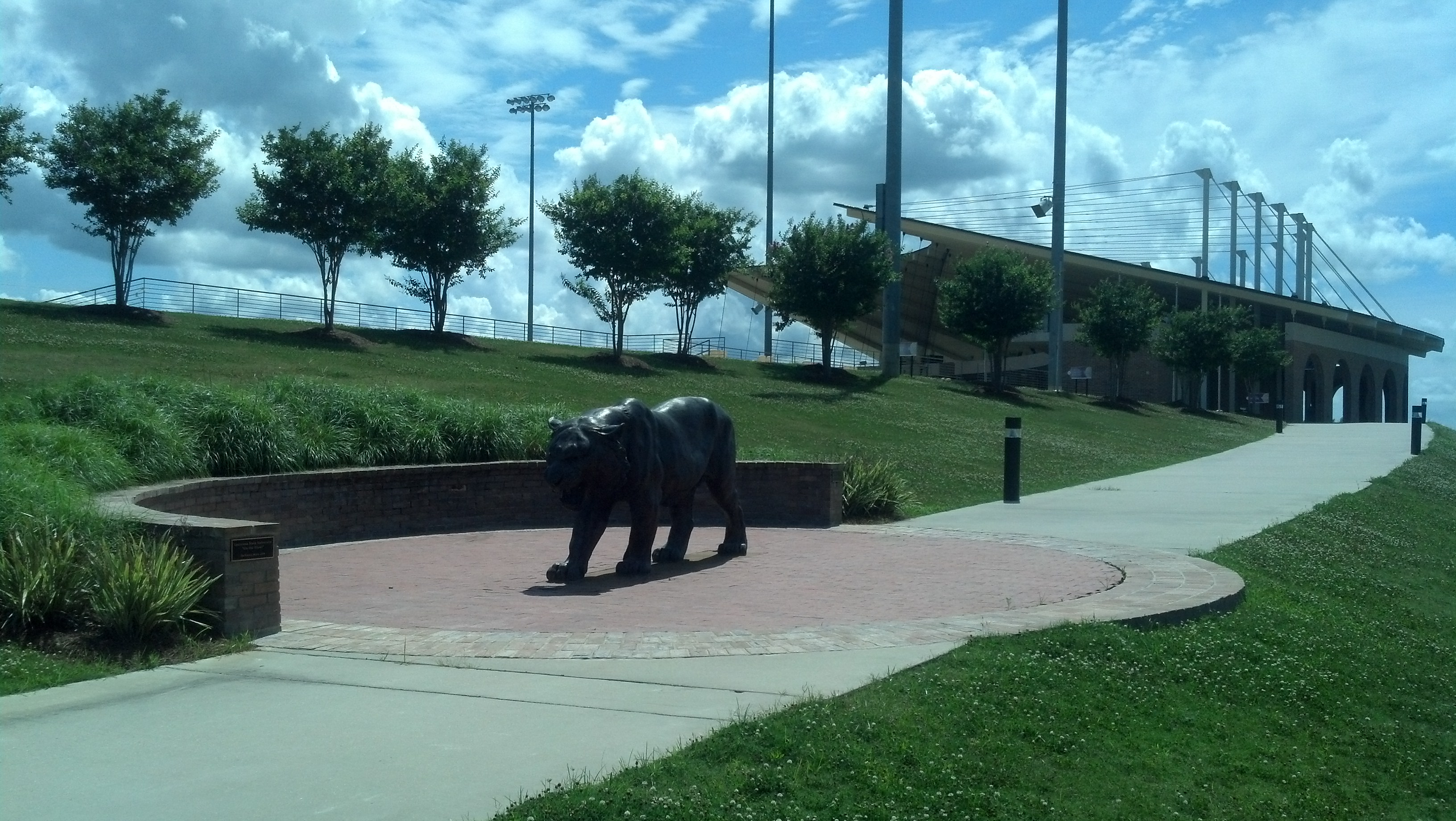
Tiger Park

Tiger Park opened in 2009, the same year the new Alex Box Stadium opened for baseball, and serves as the Tigers' home field. The official capacity of the stadium is 1,289 people. The stadium also features an outfield berm, renamed the Tiger Park Terrace in 2016, that can accommodate an additional 1,200 fans.[1]

=== Tiger Park (1997) ===
The original Tiger Park was a softball stadium located on the campus of Louisiana State University in Baton Rouge, Louisiana.[1] It served as the home field of the LSU Tigers softball team from 1997-2008. The official capacity of the stadium was 1,000 people. The stadium was opened prior to the 1997 college softball season and played host to four NCAA Regionals in 1999, 2000, 2001, and 2006 and hosted the 2008 SEC softball tournament. The 2008 season was the twelfth and final season in the original Tiger Park. LSU closed out the original Tiger Park with a home record of 331-51, including 140-34 in the SEC and 1-1 in the SEC Tournament.

The original Tiger Park was at the northwest corner of campus, near tennis' Dub Robinson Stadium (which has also been torn down, with new tennis facilities built near the current softball park), and two dormitories.

== Practice and Training facilities ==
=== LSU Strength and Conditioning facility ===
The LSU North Stadium Weight Room strength training and conditioning facility is located in the LSU Strength and Conditioning facility. Built in 1997, it is located adjacent to Tiger Stadium. Measuring 10,000-square feet with a flat surface, it has 28 multi-purpose power stations, 36 assorted selectorized machines and 10 dumbbell stations along with a plyometric specific area, medicine balls, hurdles, plyometric boxes and assorted speed and agility equipment. It also features 4 treadmills, 6 stationary bikes, 4 elliptical cross trainers, 2 stair stepper and stepmill.

== Head coaches ==
Name	Years	Record at LSU
Carol Smith	1979–1981	45–28 Overall
Cathy Compton	1997–1998	100–26 Overall, 41–12 SEC
Glenn Moore	1998–2000	117–25 Overall, 53–7 SEC
Yvette Girouard	2001–2011	526–171–1 Overall, 220–93–1 SEC
Beth Torina	2012–present	358–153 Overall, 110–85 SEC

== See also ==
- LSU Tigers and Lady Tigers
- List of NCAA Division I softball programs
