= 2006 NCAA Division I softball rankings =

2006 NCAA Division I softball season
- Defending Champions: Michigan

Tournament

Women's College World Series
- Champions: Arizona (7th title)
- Runners-up: Northwestern (4th WCWS Appearance)
- Winning Coach: Mike Candrea (7th title)
- WCWS MOP: Alicia Hollowell (Arizona)

Seasons
- ← 2005 2007 →

The following human polls make up the 2006 NCAA Division I women's softball rankings. The NFCA/USA Today Poll is voted on by a panel of 30 Division I softball coaches and ranks to top 25 teams nationally.

== Legend ==
	Increase in ranking
	Decrease in ranking
	Not ranked previous week
Italics	Number of first place votes
(#–#)	Win-loss record
т	Tied with team above or below also with this symbol

== NFCA/USA Today ==
	Week 0 Pre	Week 1	Week 2	Week 3	Week 4	Week 5	Week 6	Week 7	Week 8	Week 9	Week 10	Week 11	Week 12	Week 13	Week Final Final	
1.	Michigan (21)	Michigan (18)	Arizona (23)	Arizona (13)	Arizona (29)	Arizona (26)	UCLA (12)	Texas (11)	Texas (29)	UCLA (23)	UCLA (26)	UCLA (27)	UCLA (22)	UCLA (28)	Arizona (30)	1.
2.	UCLA (8)	UCLA (7)	Tennessee (2)	Texas (7)	Texas	Tennessee (4)	Tennessee (11)	UCLA (16)	UCLA (1)	Texas (5)	Texas (4)	Texas (2)	Texas (8)	Texas (2)	Northwestern	2.
3.	Tennessee	Arizona (2)	UCLA (4)	Tennessee (8)	Tennessee (1)	UCLA	Texas (3)	Arizona (3)	Alabama	Alabama (2)	Arizona	Arizona	Arizona	Arizona	Tennessee	3.
4.	Texas	Tennessee	Texas	UCLA (3)	UCLA	Texas	Arizona (4)	Alabama	Arizona	Arizona	Tennessee	Tennessee (1)	Alabama	Alabama	UCLA	4.
5.	Arizona	Texas	Michigan	Alabama	Stanford	Stanford	Stanford	Tennessee	Tennessee	California	Alabama	Alabama	Oregon State	Tennessee	Texas	5.
6.	Alabama	Alabama	Stanford	Stanford	Alabama	Alabama	Alabama	Stanford	Oregon State	Tennessee	Stanford	Stanford	Tennessee	California	Arizona State	6.
7.	Stanford	Stanford	Alabama	California	California	California	California	Oregon State	California	Stanford	California	California	California	Oregon State	Alabama	7.
8.	California	California	Texas A&M	Michigan	Oregon State	Oregon State	Oregon State	California	Arizona State	Oregon State	Georgia	Oregon State	Georgia	Georgia	Oregon State	8.
9.	Texas A&M	Texas A&M	California	Oregon State	Michigan	Michigan	Arizona State	Arizona State	Stanford	Georgia	Oregon State	Georgia	Stanford	Arizona State	California	9.
10.	Georgia	Oklahoma	Oklahoma	Oklahoma	Louisiana–Lafayette	Louisiana–Lafayette	Louisiana–Lafayette	Georgia	Georgia	Arizona State	Arizona State	Arizona State	Arizona State	Stanford	Michigan	10.
11.	Baylor	Washington	Oregon State	Louisiana–Lafayette	Arizona State	Arizona State	Georgia	LSU	LSU	LSU	LSU	LSU	LSU	Northwestern	LSU	11.
12.	Oklahoma	Northwestern	Northwestern	Georgia	LSU	LSU	Michigan	Michigan	Michigan	Michigan	Michigan	Michigan	Michigan	LSU	Stanford	12.
13.	Washington	Georgia	Georgia	Arizona State	Oklahoma	Georgia	LSU	Louisiana–Lafayette	Louisiana–Lafayette	Louisiana–Lafayette	Louisiana–Lafayette	Louisiana–Lafayette	Northwestern	Michigan	Georgia	13.
14.	DePaul	Oregon State	Louisiana–Lafayette	Texas A&M	Georgia	Oklahoma	Washington	Washington	Washington	Washington	Washington	Northwestern	Nebraska	Nebraska	Nebraska	14.
15.	Oregon State	Baylor	Washington	Washington	Nebraska	Washington	Oklahoma	Texas A&M	Northwestern	Texas A&M	Texas A&M	Texas A&M	Louisiana–Lafayette	Louisiana–Lafayette	Washington	15.
16.	Northwestern	Louisiana–Lafayette	Arizona State	Northwestern	Northwestern	Nebraska	Texas A&M	Northwestern	Texas A&M	Nebraska	Northwestern	Washington	Texas A&M	Texas A&M	Louisiana–Lafayette	16.
17.	Auburn	Nebraska	Auburn	Nebraska	Washington	Northwestern	Nebraska	Oklahoma	Nebraska	Northwestern	Nebraska	Nebraska	Washington	Washington	Louisville	17.
18.	Louisiana–Lafayette	Oregon	Nebraska	Auburn	Baylor	Auburn	Northwestern	Auburn	Louisville	Louisville	Auburn	Baylor	Baylor	Louisville	South Florida	18.
19.	Florida	Iowa	Baylor	LSU	Auburn	Baylor	Auburn	Nebraska	Auburn	Baylor	Baylor	Auburn	Louisville	Baylor	Oklahoma	19.
20.	Fresno State	Auburn	LSU	Baylor	Texas A&M	Texas A&M	Louisville	Louisville	Baylor	Auburn	North Carolina	North Carolina	Auburn	Oklahoma	Baylor	20.
21.	Nebraska	DePaul	DePaul	Louisville	Louisville	Louisville	Baylor	Baylor	Oklahoma	Oklahoma	Louisville	Louisville	Oklahoma	Auburn	Auburn	21.
22.	Oregon	Arizona State	Oregon	DePaul	DePaul	Mississippi State	Mississippi State	Mississippi State	North Carolina	North Carolina	Oklahoma	Fresno State	North Carolina	North Carolina	Texas A&M	22.
23.	Missouri	Missouri	North Carolina	Oregon	Mississippi State	DePaul	Fresno State	North Carolina	Fresno State	Florida	Fresno	Oklahoma	Fresno State	Fresno State	Fresno State	23.
24.	Iowa	North Carolina	Louisville	North Carolina	Oregon	Fresno State	North Carolina	Fresno State	Florida	Fresno State	Florida	Florida	NC State	NC State	UMass	24.
25.	Georgia Tech	Fresno State т LSU т	Iowa	Fresno State	North Carolina	25. North Carolina	DePaul	Georgia Tech	Mississippi State	Missouri State	Southern Illinois	Southern Illinois	South Florida	South Florida	Florida State	25.
	Week 0 Pre	Week 1	Week 2	Week 3	Week 4	Week 5	Week 6	Week 7	Week 8	Week 9	Week 10	Week 11	Week 12	Week 13	Week Final Final	
		Dropped: 19. Florida; 25. Georgia Tech	Dropped: 23. Missouri; 25. Fresno State	Dropped: 25. Iowa	Dropped: 25. Fresno State	Dropped: 24. Oregon	None	Dropped: 25. DePaul	Dropped: 25. Georgia Tech	Dropped: 25. Mississippi State	Dropped: 25. Missouri State	None	Dropped: 24. Florida; 25. Southern Illinois	None	Dropped: 22. North Carolina; 24. NC State	
