= 2006 Arizona Wildcats softball team =

American college softball season

2006 Arizona Wildcats softball

National Champion NCAA Tucson Super Regional champion NCAA Tucson Regional champion
- Conference: Pacific-10 Conference
- Record: 54–11 (15–6 Pac-10)
- Head coach: Mike Candrea (21st season)
- Home stadium: Rita Hillenbrand Memorial Stadium

2006 Pacific-10 Conference softball standings
	Conf.				Overall
Team	W		L	PCT	W		L	PCT
No. 4 UCLA ‍†‍‍^{y}	15	–	5	.750	50	–	9	.847
No. 1 Arizona ‍‍‍^{y}	15	–	6	.714	54	–	11	.831
No. 9 California ‍‍‍^{y}	12	–	9	.571	48	–	14	.774
No. 6 Arizona State ‍‍‍^{y}	11	–	10	.524	53	–	15	.779
No. 8 Oregon State ‍‍‍^{y}	10	–	10	.500	43	–	16	.729
No. 12 Stanford ‍‍‍^{y}	10	–	11	.476	42	–	18	.700
No. 15 Washington ‍‍‍^{y}	6	–	15	.286	35	–	25	.583
Oregon ‍‍‍	4	–	17	.190	24	–	29	.453
† – Conference champion y – Invited to the NCAA tournament As of June 6, 2006; Rankings from NFCA/USA Today

The 2006 Arizona Wildcats softball team represented the University of Arizona in the 2006 NCAA Division I softball season. The Wildcats were coached by Mike Candrea, who led his twenty-first season. The Wildcats finished with a record of 54–11. They played their home games at Rita Hillenbrand Memorial Stadium and competed in the Pacific-10 Conference, where they finished second with a 15–6 record.

The Wildcats were invited to the 2006 NCAA Division I softball tournament, where they won the Regional and Super Regional and then completed a run through the Women's College World Series to claim their seventh NCAA Women's College World Series Championship.

== Roster ==
2006 Arizona Wildcats roster
Pitchers: 9 - Taryne Mowatt – sophomore; 17 – Leslie Wolfe – senior; 44 - Alicia Hollowell – senior; Catchers: 15 - Callista Balko – sophomore	Infielders: 12 – Danielle Rodriguez – sophomore; 14 – Chelsie Mesa – junior; 24 – Laine Roth – freshman; 29 - Kristie Fox – junior; 31 - Jenae Leles – freshman; 33 – Sam Banister – freshman	Outfielders: 00 – Autumn Champion – senior; 4 – Adrienne Acton – sophomore; 6 – Jill Malina – freshman; 21 – Kelly Nelson – senior; 26 - Caitlin Lowe – junior

== Schedule ==
Legend
	Arizona win
	Arizona loss
*	Non-Conference game

2006 Arizona Wildcats softball game log
Regular season

February
Date	Opponent	Site/stadium	Score	Overall record	Pac-10 record
Feb 10	vs Cal State Northridge*	Alberta B. Farrington Softball Stadium • Tempe, AZ	W 9–0^{5}	1–0	
Feb 10	vs No. 15 Northwestern*	Alberta B. Farrington Softball Stadium • Tempe, AZ	W 8–0^{6}	2–0	
Feb 11	vs No. 4 Texas*	Alberta B. Farrington Softball Stadium • Tempe, AZ	W 1–0	3–0	
Feb 11	vs No. 6 Texas A&M*	Alberta B. Farrington Softball Stadium • Tempe, AZ	W 8–0^{5}	4–0	
Feb 12	vs New Mexico*	Alberta B. Farrington Softball Stadium • Tempe, AZ	W 9–1^{5}	5–0	
Feb 12	vs Cal State Fullerton*	Alberta B. Farrington Softball Stadium • Tempe, AZ	W 2–0	6–0	
Feb 17	Tennessee Tech*	Rita Hillenbrand Memorial Stadium • Tucson, AZ	W 5–1	7–0	
Feb 17	No. 18 Missouri*	Rita Hillenbrand Memorial Stadium • Tucson, AZ	W 4–0	8–0	
Feb 18	Texas Tech*	Rita Hillenbrand Memorial Stadium • Tucson, AZ	W 6–0	9–0	
Feb 18	NC State*	Rita Hillenbrand Memorial Stadium • Tucson, AZ	W 6–0	10–0	
Feb 19	Pacific*	Rita Hillenbrand Memorial Stadium • Tucson, AZ	W 1–0	11–0	
Feb 24	vs Texas Tech*	Palm Springs, CA	W 3–1	12–0	
Feb 24	vs Texas A&M*	Palm Springs, CA	W 12–0^{5}	13–0	
Feb 25	vs Maryland*	Palm Springs, CA	W 8–1	14–0	
Feb 25	vs Ohio State*	Palm Springs, CA	W 5–1	15–0	
Feb 26	vs No. 4 Texas*	Palm Springs, CA	L 0–1	15–1	

March
Date	Opponent	Site/stadium	Score	Overall record	Pac-10 record
Mar 3	Sam Houston State*	Rita Hillenbrand Memorial Stadium • Tucson, AZ	W 8–0^{5}	16–1	
Mar 3	Long Beach State*	Rita Hillenbrand Memorial Stadium • Tucson, AZ	W 10–0^{5}	17–1	
Mar 4	Wichita State*	Rita Hillenbrand Memorial Stadium • Tucson, AZ	W 11–1	18–1	
Mar 4	South Florida*	Rita Hillenbrand Memorial Stadium • Tucson, AZ	W 10–0	19–1	
Mar 5	Long Beach State*	Rita Hillenbrand Memorial Stadium • Tucson, AZ	W 11–0^{5}	20–1	
Mar 10	No. 18 Baylor*	Rita Hillenbrand Memorial Stadium • Tucson, AZ	W 12–4^{5}	21–1	
Mar 12	No. 18 Baylor*	Rita Hillenbrand Memorial Stadium • Tucson, AZ	W 2–1^{9}	22–1	
Mar 12	No. 18 Baylor*	Rita Hillenbrand Memorial Stadium • Tucson, AZ	W 11–1^{6}	23–1	
Mar 16	vs UNLV*	Titan Softball Complex • Fullerton, CA	W 7–0	24–1	
Mar 16	vs No. 18 Texas A&M*	Titan Softball Complex • Fullerton, CA	L 0–1	24–2	
Mar 18	vs Cal State Northridge*	Titan Softball Complex • Fullerton, CA	W 9–0^{5}	25–2	
Mar 18	vs No. 6 Alabama*	Titan Softball Complex • Fullerton, CA	W 2–0	26–2	
Mar 19	vs No. 4 Texas*	Titan Softball Complex • Fullerton, CA	L 0–1^{9}	26–3	
Mar 24	No. 10 Louisiana–Lafayette*	Rita Hillenbrand Memorial Stadium • Tucson, AZ	W 5–0	27–3	
Mar 25	No. 10 Louisiana–Lafayette*	Rita Hillenbrand Memorial Stadium • Tucson, AZ	W 10–0	28–3	
Mar 26	No. 10 Louisiana–Lafayette*	Rita Hillenbrand Memorial Stadium • Tucson, AZ	W 6–2	29–3	
Mar 31	at No. 7 Oregon State	Oregon State Softball Complex • Corvallis, OR	L 1–2	29–4	0–1

April
Date	Opponent	Site/stadium	Score	Overall record	Pac-10 record
Apr 1	at Oregon	Howe Field • Eugene, OR	W 4–1	30–4	1–1
Apr 7	No. 14 Washington	Rita Hillenbrand Memorial Stadium • Tucson, AZ	W 1–0	31–4	2–1
Apr 8	No. 2 UCLA	Rita Hillenbrand Memorial Stadium • Tucson, AZ	L 1–2	31–5	2–2
Apr 9	No. 2 UCLA	Rita Hillenbrand Memorial Stadium • Tucson, AZ	L 3–8	31–6	2–3
Apr 14	at No. 9 Arizona State	Alberta B. Farrington Softball Stadium • Tempe, AZ	L 2–4^{10}	31–7	2–4
Apr 15	at No. 9 Arizona State	Alberta B. Farrington Softball Stadium • Tempe, AZ	W 3–0	32–7	3–4
Apr 21	at No. 5 Stanford	Boyd & Jill Smith Family Stadium • Stanford, CA	W 4–1	33–7	4–4
Apr 22	at No. 6 California	Levine-Fricke Field • Berkeley, CA	W 4–2^{13}	34–7	5–4
Apr 23	at No. 6 California	Levine-Fricke Field • Berkeley, CA	L 1–5	34–8	5–5
Apr 28	at No. 1 UCLA	Easton Stadium • Los Angeles, CA	L 2–8	34–9	5–6
Apr 30	at No. 15 Washington	Husky Softball Stadium • Seattle, WA	W 2–0	35–9	6–6
Apr 30	at No. 15 Washington	Husky Softball Stadium • Seattle, WA	W 10–1	36–9	7–6

May
Date	Opponent	Site/stadium	Score	Overall record	Pac-10 record
May 3	No. 6 Arizona State	Rita Hillenbrand Memorial Stadium • Tucson, AZ	W 10–0	37–9	8–6
May 5	No. 7 California	Rita Hillenbrand Memorial Stadium • Tucson, AZ	W 5–3	38–9	9–6
May 6	No. 8 Stanford	Rita Hillenbrand Memorial Stadium • Tucson, AZ	W 3–2	39–9	10–6
May 7	No. 8 Stanford	Rita Hillenbrand Memorial Stadium • Tucson, AZ	W 6–1	40–9	11–6
May 11	Oregon	Rita Hillenbrand Memorial Stadium • Tucson, AZ	W 3–1	41–9	12–6
May 11	Oregon	Rita Hillenbrand Memorial Stadium • Tucson, AZ	W 9–5	42–9	13–6
May 12	No. 7 Oregon State	Rita Hillenbrand Memorial Stadium • Tucson, AZ	W 1–0	43–9	14–6
May 13	No. 7 Oregon State	Rita Hillenbrand Memorial Stadium • Tucson, AZ	W 11–2	44–9	15–6

Postseason

NCAA Tucson Regional
Date	Opponent	Site/stadium	Score	Overall record	NCAAT record
May 18	Marist	Rita Hillenbrand Memorial Stadium • Tucson, AZ	W 9–0	45–9	1–0
May 19	Ohio State	Rita Hillenbrand Memorial Stadium • Tucson, AZ	W 6–3	46–9	2–0
May 20	No. 25 Auburn	Rita Hillenbrand Memorial Stadium • Tucson, AZ	W 4–2	47–9	3–0

NCAA Tucson Super Regional
Date	Opponent	Site/stadium	Score	Overall record	NCAAT record
May 26	No. 10 LSU	Rita Hillenbrand Memorial Stadium • Tucson, AZ	W 5–0	48–9	1–0
May 27	No. 10 LSU	Rita Hillenbrand Memorial Stadium • Tucson, AZ	L 2–3	48–10	1–1
May 27	No. 10 LSU	Rita Hillenbrand Memorial Stadium • Tucson, AZ	W 14–5^{5}	49–10	2–1

NCAA Women's College World Series
Date	Opponent	Site/stadium	Score	Overall record	WCWS Record
June 1	(7) Oregon State	ASA Hall of Fame Stadium • Oklahoma City, OK	W 3–2^{9}	50–10	1–0
June 2	(3) Texas	ASA Hall of Fame Stadium • Oklahoma City, OK	W 2–0	51–10	2–0
June 4	(8) Tennessee	ASA Hall of Fame Stadium • Oklahoma City, OK	L 0–1	51–11	2–1
June 4	(8) Tennessee	ASA Hall of Fame Stadium • Oklahoma City, OK	W 6–0	52–11	3–1
June 5	(4) Northwestern	ASA Hall of Fame Stadium • Oklahoma City, OK	W 8–0	53–11	4–1
June 6	(4) Northwestern	ASA Hall of Fame Stadium • Oklahoma City, OK	W 6–0	54–11	5–1

== Ranking movements ==
Ranking movements Legend: ██ Increase in ranking ██ Decrease in ranking
	Week														
Poll	Pre	1	2	3	4	5	6	7	8	9	10	11	12	13	Final
NFCA/USA Today	5	3	1	1	1	1	4	3	4	4	3	3	3	3	1
