= Jo Evans =

American softball player and coach

Current position
- Title: Head coach
- Team: UC Santa Barbara
- Conference: Big West
- Record: 26–22

Biographical details
- Born: July 29, 1960 (age 66); Salt Lake City, Utah, U.S.

Playing career
- 1979–1982: Utah
- Positions: Pitcher, second baseman

Coaching career (HC unless noted)
- 1984–1985: Florida State (assistant)
- 1986–1989: Colorado State
- 1990–1996: Utah
- 1997–2022: Texas A&M
- 2023–present: UC Santa Barbara

Head coaching record
- Overall: 1326–735–2

Accomplishments and honors

Championships
- High Country (1989); 2 WAC regular season (1991, 1992); 2 WAC Tournament (1991, 1992); 2 Big 12 regular season (2005, 2008); Big 12 Tournament (2008)

Awards
- 2× High Country Coach of the Year (1988, 1989); 2× WAC Coach of the Year (1991, 1994); 3× Big 12 Coach of the Year (2004, 2005, 2008)

Joleen Evans (born July 29, 1960) is an American college softball coach. She is the head coach of the UC-Santa Barbara softball team. She was the head coach for Texas A&M from 1997 to 2022. Prior to that, she served as the head coach for the Utah Utes from 1990 to 1996 and for the Colorado State Rams from 1986 to 1989. She started her coaching career as an assistant coach for Florida State in 1984. She has won conference coach of the year honors seven times over her head coaching career.

While attending the University of Utah, Evans played on the Utah Utes softball team from 1979 to 1982 at pitcher and second base. She compiled 13 triples over her career, ranking second in school history. In 1981, she posted seven triples, tying with three other Utah players for most triples in a single season.

== Awards and honors ==
- NFCA Hall of Fame Inductee (2015)
- HCAC Coach of the Year (1988, 1989)
- WAC Coach of the Year (1991, 1994)
- Big 12 Coach of the Year (2004, 2005, 2008)
- National Fastpitch Coaches Association Midwest Region Coaching Staff of the Year (2008)

== Head coaching record ==
Record table
Season	Team	Overall	Conference	Standing	Postseason
Colorado State Rams (High Country Athletic Conference) (1986–1989)
1986	Colorado State	13–16	3–7	6th	
1987	Colorado State	18–20	4–6	T–4th	
1988	Colorado State	23–17	4–6	T–4th	
1989	Colorado State	37–14	7–3	1st	
Colorado State:		91–67 (.576)	18–22 (.450)		
Utah Utes (Western Athletic Conference) (1990–1996)
1990	Utah	32–30	2–8	6th	
1991	Utah	28–16	8–2	1st	Women's College World Series
1992	Utah	25–20	9–1	1st	NCAA Regionals
1993	Utah	23–22	12–12	5th	
1994	Utah	51–13	22–4	2nd	Women's College World Series
1995	Utah	31–20	20–7	2nd	NCAA Regionals
1996	Utah	32–22	17–7	3rd	
Utah:		222–143 (.608)	90–41 (.687)		
Texas A&M Aggies (Big 12 Conference) (1997–2012)
1997	Texas A&M	37–29	7–9	6th	
1998	Texas A&M	32–25–2	6–10–1	7th	
1999	Texas A&M	41–22	7–11	7th	NCAA Regionals
2000	Texas A&M	32–23	8–10	T–4th	NCAA Regionals
2001	Texas A&M	32–19	7–11	7th	
2002	Texas A&M	40–18	9–9	5th	NCAA Regionals
2003	Texas A&M	38–22	10–8	5th	NCAA Regionals
2004	Texas A&M	33–22	13–3	2nd	NCAA Regionals
2005	Texas A&M	47–10	14–4	1st	College Station Super Regional
2006	Texas A&M	34–19	11–6	4th	Amherst Regional
2007	Texas A&M	46–14	12–6	4th	Women's College World Series
2008	Texas A&M	57–9	17–1	1st	Women's College World Series Runner-Up
2009	Texas A&M	32–22	8–9	6th	Gainesville Regional
2010	Texas A&M	44–16	12–6	T–3rd	Baton Rouge Regional
2011	Texas A&M	44–15	13–5	3rd	Tempe Super Regional
2012	Texas A&M	41–18	16–8	T–3rd	College Station Regional
Texas A&M Aggies (Southeastern Conference) (2013–2022)
2013	Texas A&M	42–18	10–13	4th	Norman Super Regional
2014	Texas A&M	37–22	9–15	11th	Norman Regional
2015	Texas A&M	40–20	12–12	8th	Norman Regional
2016	Texas A&M	39–20	6–15	10th	Lafayette Regional
2017	Texas A&M	47–13	16–7	T–3rd	Women's College World Series
2018	Texas A&M	44–18	13–11	7th	Gainesville Super Regional
2019	Texas A&M	28–27	6–18	13th	Austin Regional
2020	Texas A&M	17–9	1–2		Season canceled due to COVID-19
2021	Texas A&M	32–23	8–16	10th	Norman Regional
2022	Texas A&M	31–28	6–18	12th	Norman Regional
Texas A&M:		987–501–2 (.663)	257–243–1 (.514)		
UC Santa Barbara Gauchos (Big West Conference) (2023–present)
2023	UC Santa Barbara	26–22	13–14	T–5th	
2024	UC Santa Barbara	20–28	14–13	5th	
UC Santa Barbara:		46–50 (.479)	27–27 (.500)		
Total:		1346–763–2 (.638)			
National champion Postseason invitational champion Conference regular season champion Conference regular season and conference tournament champion Division regular season champion Division regular season and conference tournament champion Conference tournament champion

== See also ==
- List of college softball coaches with 1,000 wins
