= 2006 Northwestern Wildcats softball team =

American college softball season

2006 Northwestern Wildcats softball

NCAA Evanston Super Regional champion NCAA Evanston Regional champion Big Ten champion

Women's College World Series, runner-up
- Conference: Big Ten Conference
- Record: 50–15 (16–3 Big Ten)
- Head coach: Kate Drohan (5th season)
- Home stadium: Sharon J. Drysdale Field

2006 Big Ten Conference softball standings
	Conf.				Overall
Team	W		L	PCT	W		L	PCT
No. 2 Northwestern ‍†‍‍^{y}	16	–	3	.842	50	–	15	.769
No. 10 Michigan ‍‍‡‍^{y}	14	–	4	.778	44	–	15	.746
Iowa ‍‍‍^{y}	12	–	7	.632	39	–	22	.639
Ohio State ‍‍‍^{y}	11	–	7	.611	39	–	23	.629
Penn State ‍‍‍^{y}	10	–	10	.500	39	–	17	.696
Indiana ‍‍‍^{y}	8	–	9	.471	30	–	25	.545
Michigan State ‍‍‍	9	–	11	.450	34	–	25	.576
Illinois ‍‍‍	8	–	11	.421	24	–	31	.436
Purdue ‍‍‍	7	–	12	.368	30	–	30	.500
Wisconsin ‍‍‍	6	–	11	.353	22	–	22	.500
Minnesota ‍‍‍	1	–	17	.056	17	–	33	.340
† – Conference champion ‡ – Tournament champion y – Invited to the NCAA tournament As of August 3, 2006; Rankings from NFCA/USA Today

The 2006 Northwestern Wildcats softball team represented Northwestern University in the 2006 NCAA Division I softball season. The Wildcats were coached by Kate Drohan, who led his fifth season. The Wildcats finished with a record of 50–15. They competed in the Big Ten Conference, where they finished first with an 16–3 record.

The Wildcats were invited to the 2006 NCAA Division I softball tournament, where they swept the NCAA Evanston Regional, claimed the Super Regional in three games, and then completed a run to the title game of the Women's College World Series where they fell to champion Arizona.

== Roster ==
2006 Northwestern Wildcats roster
Pitchers: 3 - Courtnay Foster - Senior; 7 - Jessica Miller - Junior; 13 - Eileen Canney - Junior; Catchers: 00 - Erin Dyer - Freshman; 10 - Jamie Dotson - Senior	Infielders: 2 - Tammy Williams - Freshman; 6 - Darcy Sengewald - Sophomore; 12 - Gina Gonzalez - Freshman; 16 - Ashley Crane - Senior; 17 - Jessica Rigas - Freshman; 21 - Kristen Amegin - Senior; 22 - Erin Hampshire - Freshman; 23 - Garland Cooper - Junior	Outfielders: 1 - Elizabeth Piatt - Junior; 4 - Sheila McCorkle - Senior; 8 - - Katie Logan - Junior; 9 - - Kristen Salamon - Sophomore; Utility: 15 - Ann Schraufnagel - Freshman

== Schedule ==
Legend
	Northwestern win
	Northwestern loss
*	Non-Conference game

2006 Northwestern Wildcats softball game log
Regular season

February
Date	Opponent	Site/stadium	Score	Overall record	Big Ten Record
Feb 10	vs Oregon State*	Alberta B. Farrington Softball Stadium • Tempe, AZ (Kajikawa Classic)	W 1–0	1–0	
Feb 10	vs Arizona*	Alberta B. Farrington Softball Stadium • Tempe, AZ (Kajikawa Classic)	L 0–8^{6}	1–1	
Feb 11	vs Fresno State*	Alberta B. Farrington Softball Stadium • Tempe, AZ (Kajikawa Classic)	W 5–0	2–1	
Feb 11	vs Texas*	Alberta B. Farrington Softball Stadium • Tempe, AZ (Kajikawa Classic)	L 0–3	2–2	
Feb 12	vs Syracuse*	Alberta B. Farrington Softball Stadium • Tempe, AZ (Kajikawa Classic)	W 7–2	3–2	
Feb 17	vs Cal State Fullerton*	Eller Media Stadium • Paradise, NV (Louisville Slugger Desert Classic)	W 5–4	4–2	
Feb 17	at UNLV*	Eller Media Stadium • Paradise, NV (Louisville Slugger Desert Classic)	W 5–3	5–2	
Feb 18	vs Oregon State*	Eller Media Stadium • Paradise, NV (Louisville Slugger Desert Classic)	L 2–6	5–3	
Feb 18	vs California*	Eller Media Stadium • Paradise, NV (Louisville Slugger Desert Classic)	W 3–0	6–3	
Feb 19	vs Central Michigan*	Eller Media Stadium • Paradise, NV (Louisville Slugger Desert Classic)	W 11–3^{6}	7–3	
Feb 24	vs Louisville*	Golden Park • Columbus, GA (NFCA Leadoff Classic)	L 0–2	7–4	
Feb 24	vs UMass*	Golden Park • Columbus, GA (NFCA Leadoff Classic)	W 7–2	8–4	

March
Date	Opponent	Site/stadium	Score	Overall record	Big Ten Record
Mar 3	at Cal State Fullerton*	Anderson Family Field • Fullerton, CA (Worth Invitational)	W 4–0	9–4	
Mar 4	vs Tennessee*	Anderson Family Field • Fullerton, CA (Worth Invitational)	L 2–3	9–5	
Mar 4	vs Stanford*	Anderson Family Field • Fullerton, CA (Worth Invitational)	L 4–5^{8}	9–6	
Mar 5	vs Texas Tech*	Anderson Family Field • Fullerton, CA (Worth Invitational)	W 7–0	10–6	
Mar 17	vs Kansas*	Rainbow Wahine Softball Stadium • Honolulu, HI (Bank of Hawaii Invitational)	W 1–0	11–6	
Mar 17	vs Longwood*	Rainbow Wahine Softball Stadium • Honolulu, HI (Bank of Hawaii Invitational)	W 4–3	12–6	
Mar 18	at Oklahoma State*	Rainbow Wahine Softball Stadium • Honolulu, HI (Bank of Hawaii Invitational)	W 1–0	13–6	
Mar 18	vs San Diego State*	Rainbow Wahine Softball Stadium • Honolulu, HI (Bank of Hawaii Invitational)	W 5–2	14–6	
Mar 20	vs Kansas*	Rainbow Wahine Softball Stadium • Honolulu, HI	W 6–2	15–6	
Mar 20	at Hawaii*	Rainbow Wahine Softball Stadium • Honolulu, HI	W 5–0	16–6	
Mar 23	at Cal State Fullerton*	Anderson Family Field • Fullerton, CA	L 3–6	16–7	
Mar 23	at Cal State Fullerton*	Anderson Family Field • Fullerton, CA	W 10–0^{6}	17–7	
Mar 25	at Long Beach State*	LBSU Softball Complex • Long Beach, CA	L 5–6	17–8	
Mar 26	at UCLA*	Easton Stadium • Los Angeles, CA	W 3–2	18–8	
Mar 31	Wisconsin	Sharon J. Drysdale Field • Evanston, IL	W 16–0^{5}	19–8	1–0

April
Date	Opponent	Site/stadium	Score	Overall record	Big Ten Record	
Apr 1	Wisconsin	Sharon J. Drysdale Field • Evanston, IL	W 10–3	20–8	2–0	
Apr 2	Iowa	Sharon J. Drysdale Field • Evanston, IL	W 3–1	21–8	3–0	
Apr 2	Iowa	Sharon J. Drysdale Field • Evanston, IL	W 12–2	22–8	4–0	
Apr 4	at Northern Illinois*	Mary M. Bell Field • DeKalb, IL	W 3–1	23–8		
Apr 7	at Penn State	Nittany Lion Field • University Park, PA	W 1–0	24–8	5–0	
Apr 8	at Penn State	Nittany Lion Field • University Park, PA	W 3–1	25–8	6–0	
Apr 9	at Ohio State	Buckeye Field • Columbus, OH	L 1–2	25–9	6–1	
Apr 9	at Ohio State	Buckeye Field • Columbus, OH	L 2–3	25–10	6–2	
Apr 11	UIC*	Sharon J. Drysdale Field • Evanston, IL	W 9–0^{5}	26–10		
Apr 14	Indiana	Sharon J. Drysdale Field • Evanston, IL	W 8–0^{6}	27–10	7–2	
Apr 15	Indiana	Sharon J. Drysdale Field • Evanston, IL	W 11–1	28–10	8–2	
Apr 16	Purdue	Sharon J. Drysdale Field • Evanston, IL	W 4–0	29–10	9–2	
Apr 18	Notre Dame*	Sharon J. Drysdale Field • Evanston, IL	W 3–2	30–10		
Apr 20	Loyola (IL)*	Sharon J. Drysdale Field • Evanston, IL	W 8–0^{5}	31–10		
Apr 23	at Minnesota	Jane Sage Cowles Stadium • Minneapolis, MN	W 4–3^{18}	32–10	10–2	
Apr 23	at Minnesota	Jane Sage Cowles Stadium • Minneapolis, MN	Jane Sage Cowles Stadium • Minneapolis, MN	W 4–2	33–10	11–2
Apr 28	at Michigan State	Old College Field • East Lansing, MI	W 5–0	34–10	12–2	
Apr 29	at Michigan State	Old College Field • East Lansing, MI	W 9–4	35–10	13–2	
Apr 30	at Michigan	Alumni Field • Ann Arbor, MI	W 2–1	36–10	14–2	
Apr 30	at Michigan	Alumni Field • Ann Arbor, MI	L 0–2	36–11	14–3	

May
Date	Opponent	Site/stadium	Score	Overall record	Big Ten Record
May 2	at DePaul*	Cacciatore Stadium • Chicago, IL	W 2–0^{9}	37–11	
May 2	at DePaul*	Cacciatore Stadium • Chicago, IL	W 3–1	38–11	
May 6	at Illinois	Eichelberger Field • Urbana, IL	W 3–0	39–11	15–3
May 6	at Illinois	Eichelberger Field • Urbana, IL	W 5–0	40–11	16–3

Postseason

Big Ten Tournament
Date	Opponent	Rank (Seed)	Site/stadium	Score	Overall record	Big Ten T record
May 12	(8) Illinois	(1)	Sharon J. Drysdale Field • Evanston, IL	W 4–1	41–11	1–0
May 13	(4) Ohio State	(1)	Sharon J. Drysdale Field • Evanston, IL	W 4–0	42–11	2–0
May 13	(2) Michigan	(1)	Sharon J. Drysdale Field • Evanston, IL	L 0–6	42–12	2–1

NCAA Evanston Regional
Date	Opponent	Site/stadium	Score	Overall record	NCAAT record
May 19	Southern Illinois	Sharon J. Drysdale Field • Evanston, IL	W 4–0	43–12	1–0
May 20	Notre Dame	Sharon J. Drysdale Field • Evanston, IL	W 9–0^{5}	44–12	2–0
May 21	Notre Dame	Sharon J. Drysdale Field • Evanston, IL	W 7–4	45–12	3–0

NCAA Evanston Super Regional
Date	Opponent	Site/stadium	Score	Overall record	NCAAT record
May 26	UMass	Sharon J. Drysdale Field • Evanston, IL	L 0–1	45–13	0–1
May 27	UMass	Sharon J. Drysdale Field • Evanston, IL	W 4–2	46–13	1–1
May 27	UMass	Sharon J. Drysdale Field • Evanston, IL	W 9–0^{5}	47–13	2–1

NCAA Women's College World Series
Date	Opponent	Rank (Seed)	Site/stadium	Score	Overall record	WCWS Record
June 1	(5) Alabama	(4)	ASA Hall of Fame Stadium • Oklahoma City, OK	W 6–5^{10}	48–13	1–0
June 2	(8) Tennessee	(4)	ASA Hall of Fame Stadium • Oklahoma City, OK	W 2–0	49–13	2–0
June 4	(1) UCLA	(4)	ASA Hall of Fame Stadium • Oklahoma City, OK	W 3–1^{8}	50–13	3–0
June 5	(2) Arizona	(4)	ASA Hall of Fame Stadium • Oklahoma City, OK	L 0–8	50–14	3–1
June 6	(2) Arizona	(4)	ASA Hall of Fame Stadium • Oklahoma City, OK	L 0–5	50–15	3–2

== Ranking movements ==
Ranking movements Legend: ██ Increase in ranking ██ Decrease in ranking
	Week														
Poll	Pre	1	2	3	4	5	6	7	8	9	10	11	12	13	Final
NFCA/USA Today	16	12	12	16	16	17	18	16	15	17	16	14	13	11	2
