= Jay Miller (softball) =

American softball coach

Coaching career (HC unless noted)
- 1980–1981: Purdue
- 1982–1984: Missouri (Asst.)
- 1985–1987: Oklahoma City
- 1988–2002: Missouri
- 2003–2011: Mississippi State
- 2013–2015: Louisville (Asst.)
- 2016–2018: Rutgers (Asst.)
- 2019–2021: Hofstra

Head coaching record
- Overall: 1043–699 (.599)

Accomplishments and honors

Awards
- Big 12 Coach of the Year (1997)

Jay Miller is the former head coach of the Hofstra Pride softball team which represents Hofstra University in the Colonial Athletic Association. He was previously head coach of the softball teams at Purdue, Oklahoma City, Missouri, and Mississippi State.

== Coaching career ==
Miller began coaching at Purdue after finishing his master's degree there. He then spent 3 seasons as an assistant coach at Missouri, helping lead the Tigers to two appearances in the Women's College World Series. Miller then moved on to Oklahoma City University, where he led the Stars to two appearances in the NAIA Women's College World Series, including a runner-up finish in 1986. Miller was also the pitching coach for the Netherlands Antilles team at the 1987 Pan American Games.

Miller returned to Missouri in 1988, where he spent fifteen seasons as the head coach, leading the Tigers to 2 conference championships, 5 NCAA Tournament appearances, and two Women's College World Series appearances. However, Miller was fired in 2002 after 3 straight losing seasons. Miller was then hired as head coach of Mississippi State, where he led the Bulldogs to 6 NCAA Tournament appearances in nine seasons, despite never having a winning conference record. Miller was fired after the 2011 season, his second straight losing season.

While at Mississippi State, Miller was also the head coach of the U.S. national team. He joined the staff at Louisville Cardinals softball in the fall of 2012., officially becoming pitching coach before the 2015 season.

In June 2018, Miller was named the head coach of the Hofstra Pride after spending three seasons as an assistant coach at Rutgers. Miller was inducted into the National Fastpitch Coaches Association Hall of Fame in 2008.

== Head coaching record ==
Record table
Season	Team	Overall	Conference	Standing	Postseason
Purdue Boilermakers () (1980–1981)
1980	Purdue	13–10			
1981	Purdue	16–11			
Purdue:		29–21 (.580)			
Oklahoma City Chiefs (Midwestern City Conference) (1985)
1985	Oklahoma City	28–32			
Oklahoma City Chiefs (Sooner Athletic Conference) (1986–1987)
1986	Oklahoma City	50–26			NAIA WCWS
1987	Oklahoma City	46–27			NAIA WCWS
Oklahoma City:		124–85 (.593)			
Missouri Tigers (Big 8 Conference) (1988–1995)
1988	Missouri	44–18		4th	
1989	Missouri	35–22		3rd	
1990	Missouri	30–14		4th	
1991	Missouri	39–14		1st	NCAA WCWS
1992	Missouri	41–14		4th	
1993	Missouri	31–18		3rd	
1994	Missouri	40–23			NCAA WCWS
1995	Missouri	47–19		3rd	NCAA Regional
Missouri Tigers (Big 12 Conference) (1996–2002)
1996	Missouri	31–22	11–10	3rd	
1997	Missouri	47–16	15–3	1st	NCAA Regional
1998	Missouri	36–20	5–13	9th	
1999	Missouri	41–21	10–5	3rd	NCAA Regional
2000	Missouri	34–27	6–13	8th	
2001	Missouri	31–28	5–11	8th	
2002	Missouri	29–33	4–14	9th	
Missouri:		556–309 (.643)			
Mississippi State Lady Bulldogs (Southeastern Conference) (2003–2011)
2003	Mississippi State	34–30	13–16	8th	NCAA Regional
2004	Mississippi State	39–26	14–15	7th	NCAA Regional
2005	Mississippi State	35–31	12–18	10th	NCAA Regional
2006	Mississippi State	33–28	7–22	10th	
2007	Mississippi State	35–27	14–14	5th	NCAA Regional
2008	Mississippi State	41–22	13–14	7th	NCAA Regional
2009	Mississippi State	28–28	8–19	9th	NCAA Regional
2010	Mississippi State	26–29	7–20	10th	
2011	Mississippi State	24–32	10–19	8th	
Mississippi State:		295–253 (.538)	40–60 (.400)		
Hofstra Pride (Colonial Athletic Association) (2019–Present)
2019	Hofstra	20-27	7-13	T-7th	
2020	Hofstra	3-15	0-0		
2021	Hofstra	16-16	6-8	3rd (North)	
Hofstra:		39–58 (.402)	13–21 (.382)		
Total:		1043–699 (.599)			
National champion Postseason invitational champion Conference regular season champion Conference regular season and conference tournament champion Division regular season champion Division regular season and conference tournament champion Conference tournament champion
