= Shelly Hoerner =

American softball coach

Current position
- Title: Head coach
- Team: D'Youville Saints
- Conference: ECC
- Record: 12–8

Playing career
- 1993–1994: Barry
- 1995–1996: Canisius

Coaching career (HC unless noted)
- 1996–1999: Barry (assistant)
- 2000: Valdosta State
- 2001–2005: Barry
- 2006–2013: College of Charleston
- 2014–2017: Georgia Tech
- 2018–2024: Appalachian State
- 2025–present: D'Youville

Head coaching record
- Overall: 772–695 (.526)

Shelly Hoerner is an American former softball player and head coach. She is the head coach at D'Youville.

== Career ==
Hoerner attended Barry University for two years, before transferring to Canisius College, where she played for the Canisius Golden Griffins softball team. Hoerner later went on to serve as head softball coach at Valdosta State University in 2000, at Barry University from 2001 to 2005, at the College of Charleston from 2006 to 2013, and at Georgia Tech from 2014 to 2017. Hoerner was named head softball coach at Appalachian State University on June 22, 2017. On May 7th, 2024 Appalachian State University parted ways with Hoerner who finished with a 161-172 record overall.

== Head coaching record ==
Record table
Season	Team	Overall	Conference	Standing	Postseason
Valdosta State (Gulf South Conference) (2000)
2000	Valdosta State	13–38	6–17		
Valdosta State:		13–38 (.255)	6–17 (.261)		
Barry (Sunshine State Conference) (2001–2006)
2001	Barry	29–20	16–12		
2002	Barry	44–15			
2003	Barry	52–10			
2004	Barry	31–18			
2005	Barry	35–19			
Barry:		191–82 (.700)			
Charleston Cougars (Southern Conference) (2006–2013)
2006	Charleston	29–30	14–7	2nd	
2007	Charleston	34–26	14–7	2nd	
2008	Charleston	33–33	12–8	4th	
2009	Charleston	23–26	14–9	2nd	
2010	Charleston	24–27	10–13	6th	
2011	Charleston	37–21	12–11	4th	
2012	Charleston	37–23	14–9	3rd	
2013	Charleston	37–20	15–8	2nd	
Charleston:		225–176 (.561)	91–65 (.583)		
Georgia Tech (Atlantic Coast Conference) (2014–2017)
2014	Georgia Tech	23–24	11–17	8th	
2015	Georgia Tech	16–34	6–18	10th	
2016	Georgia Tech	22–33	7–16	10th	
2017	Georgia Tech	19–34	8–16	9th	
Georgia Tech:		80–125 (.390)	32–67 (.323)		
Appalachian State Mountaineers (Sun Belt Conference) (2018–2024)
2018	Appalachian State	17–35	4–20	10th	
2019	Appalachian State	31–25	13–13	5th	
2020	Appalachian State	13–9	1–2		Season cancelled due to the COVID-19 pandemic
2021	Appalachian State	27–19	8–12	5th	
2022	Appalachian State	29–26	10–15	6th	
2023	Appalachian State	23–28	4–18	12th	
2024	Appalachian State	21–30	4–20	11th	
Appalachian State:		161–172 (.483)	44–100 (.306)		
D'Youville Saints (East Coast Conference) (2025–present)
2025	D'Youville	12–8	4–4		
D'Youville:		12–8 (.600)	4–4 (.500)		
Total:		772–695 (.526)			
National champion Postseason invitational champion Conference regular season champion Conference regular season and conference tournament champion Division regular season champion Division regular season and conference tournament champion Conference tournament champion
