= Appalachian State Mountaineers softball =

- Founded: 2001; 25 years ago
- University: Appalachian State University
- Head coach: Whitney Jones (2nd season)
- Conference: Sun Belt
- Location: Boone, North Carolina, US
- Home stadium: Sywassink/Lloyd Family Stadium (capacity: 1,000)
- Nickname: Mountaineers
- Colors: Black and gold

Regular-season conference championships
- SoCon: 2013

The Appalachian State Mountaineers softball is the team that represents Appalachian State University in NCAA Division I college softball. The team participates in the Sun Belt Conference. The Mountaineers are currently led by first-year head coach Whitney Jones. The team currently plays their home games at Sywassink/Lloyd Family Stadium located on the university's campus.

== Year-by-year results ==
Record table
Season	Coach	Overall	Conference	Standing	Postseason
Southern Conference (2001–2014)
2001	Willie Rucker	13–36	4–13	8th	
2002	Willie Rucker	11–45	4–15	8th	
2003	Willie Rucker	15–36	4–16	8th	
2004	Willie Rucker	22–39	7–14	8th	
2005	Willie Rucker	24–36	7–14	6th	
2006	Willie Rucker	29–30	10–11	5th	
2007	Willie Rucker	20–38	11–10	3rd	
2008	Amy Herrington	11–37	6–10	7th	
2009	Amy Herrington	26–29	14–9	2nd	
2010	Amy Herrington	27–25	11–12	6th	
2011	Shae Wesley	26–24	15–7	2nd	
2012	Shae Wesley	22–25	9–13	5th	
2013	Shae Wesley	31–22	17–7	1st	
2014	Shae Wesley	19–32	7–13	7th	
SoCon:		296–454	126–164		
Sun Belt Conference (2015–present)
2015	Janice Savage	14–35	1–22	9th	
2016	Janice Savage	11–45	2–22	9th	
2017	Janice Savage	14–34	2–22	10th	
2018	Shelly Hoerner	17–35	4–20	10th	
2019	Shelly Hoerner	31–25	13–13	5th	
2020	Shelly Hoerner	13–9	1–2	No conference season	Season canceled due to the COVID-19 pandemic
2021	Shelly Hoerner	27–19	8–12	5th	
2022	Shelly Hoerner	29–26	10–15	6th	
2023	Shelly Hoerner	23–28	4–18	12th	
2024	Shelly Hoerner	21–30	4–20	11th	
2025	Whitney Jones	42–18	13–11	5th	NCAA Regionals
Sun Belt:		242–294	61–197		
Total:		538–748			
National champion Postseason invitational champion Conference regular season champion Conference regular season and conference tournament champion Division regular season champion Division regular season and conference tournament champion Conference tournament champion
