= 2006 UCLA Bruins softball team =

American college softball season

2006 UCLA Bruins softball

NCAA Los Angeles Super Regional champion NCAA Los Angeles Regional champion Pac-10 champion

Women's College World Series, 2–2
- Conference: Pacific-10 Conference
- Record: 50–9 (15–5 Pac-10)
- Head coach: Sue Enquist (18th season)
- Home stadium: Easton Stadium

2006 Pacific-10 Conference softball standings
	Conf.				Overall
Team	W		L	PCT	W		L	PCT
No. 4 UCLA ‍†‍‍^{y}	15	–	5	.750	50	–	9	.847
No. 1 Arizona ‍‍‍^{y}	15	–	6	.714	54	–	11	.831
No. 9 California ‍‍‍^{y}	12	–	9	.571	48	–	14	.774
No. 6 Arizona State ‍‍‍^{y}	11	–	10	.524	53	–	15	.779
No. 8 Oregon State ‍‍‍^{y}	10	–	10	.500	43	–	16	.729
No. 12 Stanford ‍‍‍^{y}	10	–	11	.476	42	–	18	.700
No. 15 Washington ‍‍‍^{y}	6	–	15	.286	35	–	25	.583
Oregon ‍‍‍	4	–	17	.190	24	–	29	.453
† – Conference champion y – Invited to the NCAA tournament As of June 6, 2006; Rankings from NFCA/USA Today

The 2006 UCLA Bruins softball team represented the University of California, Los Angeles in the 2006 NCAA Division I softball season. The Bruins were coached by Sue Enquist, in her eighteenth and final season as head coach. The Bruins played their home games at Easton Stadium and finished with a record of 50–9. They competed in the Pacific-10 Conference, where they finished first with a 15–5 record.

The Bruins were invited to the 2006 NCAA Division I softball tournament, where they won the Los Angeles Regional and Super Regional to advance to the Women's College World Series. They finished in fourth place with wins against Alabama and Texas and losses to Tennessee and eventual runner-up Northwestern.

== Personnel ==
=== Roster ===
2006 UCLA Bruins roster
Pitchers: 4 - Anjelica Selden - Sophomore; 17 - Lisa Dodd - Junior; Catchers: 10 - Jaisa Creps - Junior; 21 - Shana Stewart - Junior; 24 - Emily Zaplatosch - Senior	Infielders: 2 - Andrea Duran - Senior; 11 - Ashley Herrera - Junior; 12 - Jodie Legaspi - Junior; 19 - Caitlin Benyi - Senior; 22 - Celina Rubalcaba - Junior; 27 - Jennifer Schroeder - Sophomore; 32 - Kristen Dedmon - Junior; Outfielders: 7 - Tara Henry - Junior; 23 - Whitney Holum - Junior	Utility: 5 - Alissa Eno - Senior; 8 - Kelsey Enquist - Freshman; 13 - Krista Colburn - Sophomore; 18 - Maryn Oyoung - Freshman; 44 - Danielle Peterson - Sophomore

=== Coaches ===
2006 UCLA Bruins softball coaching staff
- Sue Enquist - Head coach - 18th season
- Kelly Inouye-Perez - Assistant Coach - 13th season
- Gina Vecchione - Assistant Coach - 7th season
- Natasha Watley - Assistant Coach - 1st season

== Schedule ==
Legend
	UCLA win
	UCLA loss
*	Non-Conference game

2006 UCLA Bruins softball game log
Regular season

February
Date	Opponent	Rank	Site/stadium	Score	Overall record	Pac-10 record
Feb 9	vs Sacramento State*	No. 2	Sportsplex USA Poway • Poway, CA (SDSU Campbell/Cartier Classic)	W 22–3 ^{(5)}	1–0	
Feb 9	vs Cal Poly Mustangs*	No. 2	Sportsplex USA Poway • Poway, CA (SDSU Campbell/Cartier Classic)	W 13–0 ^{(5)}	2–0	
Feb 10	vs UC Santa Barbara*	No. 2	Sportsplex USA Poway • Poway, CA (SDSU Campbell/Cartier Classic)	W 9–3	3–0	
Feb 11	vs UMass*	No. 2	Sportsplex USA Poway • Poway, CA (SDSU Campbell/Cartier Classic)	W 8–0 ^{(6)}	4–0	
Feb 12	vs San Diego State*	No. 2	Sportsplex USA Poway • Poway, CA (SDSU Campbell/Cartier Classic)	W 2–1	5–0	
Feb 15	at Long Beach State*	No. 2	LBSU Softball Complex • Long Beach, CA	L 0–1	5–1	
Feb 18	No. 25 Fresno State*	No. 2	Easton Stadium • Los Angeles, CA	W 2–0	6–1	
Feb 19	No. 25 Fresno State*	No. 2	Easton Stadium • Los Angeles, CA	W 1–0 ^{(10)}	7–1	
Feb 21	at UC Riverside*	No. 2	Amy S. Harrison Field • Riverside, CA	W 2–0	8–1	
Feb 24	vs Ohio State*	No. 2	Big League Dreams Sports Park • Cathedral City, CA (Palm Springs Classic)	W 4–1	9–1	
Feb 24	vs No. 20 LSU*	No. 3	Big League Dreams Sports Park • Cathedral City, CA (Palm Springs Classic)	W 3–1	10–1	
Feb 25	vs Kansas*	No. 3	Big League Dreams Sports Park • Cathedral City, CA (Palm Springs Classic)	W 4–3	11–1	
Feb 25	vs No. 8 Texas A&M*	No. 3	Big League Dreams Sports Park • Cathedral City, CA (Palm Springs Classic)	W 5–0	12–1	
Feb 26	vs No. 10 Oklahoma*	No. 3	Big League Dreams Sports Park • Cathedral City, CA (Palm Springs Classic)	W 2–0	13–1	

March
Date	Opponent	Rank	Site/stadium	Score	Overall record	Pac-10 record
Mar 3	Cal Poly*	No. 4	Easton Stadium • Los Angeles, CA	W 9–1 ^{(5)}	14–1	
Mar 3	Cal Poly*	No. 4	Easton Stadium • Los Angeles, CA	W 8–0 ^{(5)}	15–1	
Mar 4	San Jose State*	No. 4	Easton Stadium • Los Angeles, CA	W 8–0 ^{(5)}	16–1	
Mar 4	San Jose State*	No. 4	Easton Stadium • Los Angeles, CA	W 8–0 ^{(5)}	17–1	
Mar 5	Santa Clara*	No. 4	Easton Stadium • Los Angeles, CA	W 8–2	18–1	
Mar 5	Santa Clara*	No. 4	Easton Stadium • Los Angeles, CA	W 8–1	19–1	
Mar 8	Cal State Fullerton*	No. 4	Easton Stadium • Los Angeles, CA	W 1–0 ^{(10)}	20–1	
Mar 10	vs No. 23 Mississippi State*	No. 4	Mayfair Park Lakewood • Lakewood, CA (Long Beach State Invitational)	W 2–0	21–1	
Mar 11	vs Mercer*	No. 4	Mayfair Park Lakewood • Lakewood, CA (Long Beach State Invitational)	W 8–0 ^{(6)}	22–1	
Mar 11	vs Syracuse*	No. 4	Mayfair Park Lakewood • Lakewood, CA (Long Beach State Invitational)	W 3–0	23–1	
Mar 12	vs No. 23 Mississippi State*	No. 4	Mayfair Park Lakewood • Lakewood, CA (Long Beach State Invitational)	W 3–0	24–1	
Mar 12	at Long Beach State*	No. 4	Mayfair Park Lakewood • Lakewood, CA (Long Beach State Invitational)	W 4–2	25–1	
Mar 14	UNLV*	No. 4	Easton Stadium • Los Angeles, CA	W 11–4	26–1	
Mar 15	No. 9 Michigan*	No. 3	Easton Stadium • Los Angeles, CA	W 6–4 ^{(10)}	27–1	
Mar 25	at Cal State Northridge*	No. 1	Matador Diamond • Northridge, CA	W 1–0	28–1	
Mar 26	No. 18 Northwestern*	No. 1	Easton Stadium • Los Angeles, CA	L 2–3	28–2	
Mar 31	No. 6 Stanford	No. 1	Easton Stadium • Los Angeles, CA	W 5–4	29–2	1–0

April
Date	Opponent	Rank	Site/stadium	Score	Overall record	Pac-10 record
Apr 1	No. 8 California	No. 1	Easton Stadium • Los Angeles, CA	L 3–10	29–3	1–1
Apr 2	No. 8 California	No. 1	Easton Stadium • Los Angeles, CA	W 3–1	30–3	2–1
Apr 7	at No. 8 Arizona State	No. 1	Alberta B. Farrington Softball Stadium • Tempe, AZ	W 7–4	31–3	3–1
Apr 8	at No. 4 Arizona	No. 1	Rita Hillenbrand Memorial Stadium • Tucson, AZ	W 2–1	32–3	4–1
Apr 9	at No. 4 Arizona	No. 1	Rita Hillenbrand Memorial Stadium • Tucson, AZ	W 8–3	33–3	5–1
Apr 14	at No. 14 Washington	No. 1	Husky Softball Stadium • Seattle, WA	W 6–0	34–3	6–1
Apr 21	No. 9 Oregon State	No. 1	Easton Stadium • Los Angeles, CA	L 0–2	34–4	6–2
Apr 22	Oregon	No. 1	Easton Stadium • Los Angeles, CA	W 9–3	35–4	7–2
Apr 23	Oregon	No. 1	Easton Stadium • Los Angeles, CA	W 5–2	36–4	8–2
Apr 26	No. 14 Washington	No. 1	Easton Stadium • Los Angeles, CA	L 2–3	36–5	8–3
Apr 26	No. 14 Washington	No. 1	Easton Stadium • Los Angeles, CA	W 7–6	37–5	9–3
Apr 28	No. 3 Arizona	No. 1	Easton Stadium • Los Angeles, CA	W 8–2	38–5	10–3
Apr 29	No. 10 Arizona State	No. 1	Easton Stadium • Los Angeles, CA	W 1–0	39–5	11–3
Apr 30	No. 10 Arizona State	No. 1	Easton Stadium • Los Angeles, CA	W 3–1	40–5	12–3

May
Date	Opponent	Rank	Site/stadium	Score	Overall record	Pac-10 record
May 5	at Oregon	No. 1	Jane Sanders Stadium • Eugene, OR	W 7–0	41–5	13–3
May 6	at No. 5 Oregon State	No. 1	Oregon State Softball Complex • Corvallis, OR	W 1–0	42–5	14–3
May 11	at No. 6 California	No. 1	Levine-Fricke Field • Berkeley, CA	W 2–0	43–5	15–3
May 12	at No. 10 Stanford	No. 1	Boyd & Jill Smith Family Stadium • Stanford, CA	L 2–3	43–6	15–4
May 13	at No. 10 Stanford	No. 1	Boyd & Jill Smith Family Stadium • Stanford, CA	L 4–5	43–7	15–5

Postseason

NCAA Los Angeles Regional
Date	Opponent	Rank	Site/stadium	Score	Overall record	NCAAT record
May 19	Missouri State	No. 1	Easton Stadium • Los Angeles, CA	W 11–2 ^{(6)}	44–7	1–0
May 20	Long Beach State	No. 1	Easton Stadium • Los Angeles, CA	W 5–0	45–7	2–0
May 21	San Diego State	No. 1	Easton Stadium • Los Angeles, CA	W 7–0	46–7	3–0

NCAA Los Angeles Regional
Date	Opponent	Rank	Site/stadium	Score	Overall record	NCAAT record
May 27	No. 25 South Florida	No. 1	Easton Stadium • Los Angeles, CA	W 2–0	47–7	1–0
May 28	No. 25 South Florida	No. 1	Easton Stadium • Los Angeles, CA	W 3–1	48–7	2–0

NCAA Women's College World Series
Date	Opponent	Rank (Seed)	Site/stadium	Score	Overall record	WCWS Record
June 1	(8) Tennessee	No. 1 (1)	ASA Hall of Fame Stadium • Oklahoma City, OK	L 3–4	48–8	0–1
June 3	(5) Alabama	No. 1 (1)	ASA Hall of Fame Stadium • Oklahoma City, OK	W 4–1	49–8	1–1
June 3	(3) Texas	No. 1 (1)	ASA Hall of Fame Stadium • Oklahoma City, OK	W 2–0	50–8	2–1
June 4	(4) Northwestern	No. 1 (1)	ASA Hall of Fame Stadium • Oklahoma City, OK	L 1–3 ^{(8)}	50–9	2–2

== Ranking movements ==
Ranking movements Legend: ██ Increase in ranking ██ Decrease in ranking
	Week														
Poll	Pre	1	2	3	4	5	6	7	8	9	10	11	12	13	Final
NFCA/USA Today	2	2	3	4	4	3	1	2	2	1	1	1	1	1	4
