= Larissa Anderson (softball) =

American softball coach

Current position
- Title: Head coach
- Team: Missouri
- Conference: SEC
- Record: 270–174 (.608)

Biographical details
- Born: Lake George, New York, U.S.
- Education: Gannon

Playing career
- 1994–1997: Gannon
- Position: Outfielder

Coaching career (HC unless noted)
- 1998: Gannon (asst.)
- 1999–2000: LIU Post (asst.)
- 2002–2004: Hofstra (asst.)
- 2005–2014: Hofstra (AHC)
- 2015–2018: Hofstra
- 2019–Present: Missouri

Head coaching record
- Overall: 400–247–1 (.618)
- Tournaments: NCAA: 17–15 (.531)

Accomplishments and honors

Championships
- 2× CAA Tournament Champions (2015, 2018)

Awards
- NFCA Northeast Region's Coaching Staff of the Year (2015)

Larissa Anderson is an American softball coach who is the current head coach at Missouri.

== Coaching career ==
=== Hofstra ===
Anderson was hired as Hofstra's head coach in 2014 replacing longtime head coach, Bill Edwards.

=== Missouri ===
On May 26, 2018, Larissa Anderson was announced as the new head coach of the Missouri softball program, replacing Ehren Earleywine who was fired before the 2018 season.

== Head coaching record ==
=== College ===
Record table
Season	Team	Overall	Conference	Standing	Postseason
Hofstra Pride (Colonial Athletic Association) (2015–2018)
2015	Hofstra	38–14–1	17–3	2nd	NCAA Regional
2016	Hofstra	24–22	8–10	T-6th	
2017	Hofstra	27–23	11–8	2nd	
2018	Hofstra	41–14	17–4	2nd	NCAA Regional
Hofstra:		130–73–1 (.640)	53–25 (.679)		
Missouri Tigers (Southeastern Conference) (2019–Present)
2019	Missouri	35–25	12–12	T-6th	NCAA Regional
2020	Missouri	19–7	3–0		Season canceled due to COVID-19
2021	Missouri	42–17	15–9	4th	NCAA Super Regional
2022	Missouri	38–22	12–11	7th	NCAA Regional
2023	Missouri	35-26	7-17	13th	NCAA Regional
2024	Missouri	48-18	13-11	5th	NCAA Super Regional
2025	Missouri	25-31	6-18	T-14th	
2026	Missouri	28-28	9-15	T-10th	
Missouri:		270–174 (.608)	77–93 (.453)		
Total:		400–247–1 (.618)			
National champion Postseason invitational champion Conference regular season champion Conference regular season and conference tournament champion Division regular season champion Division regular season and conference tournament champion Conference tournament champion
