= Ehren Earleywine =

American sports coach and administrator

Current position
- Title: Assistant Head Coach
- Team: Tennessee
- Conference: SEC

Biographical details
- Born: November 4, 1970 (age 55); Jefferson City, Missouri, U.S.

Playing career

Baseball
- 1990: Southwest Missouri State
- 1991–1993: Westminster (MO)
- Position: Shortstop

Coaching career (HC unless noted)

Baseball
- 1994–1996: Westminster (MO) (asst.)
- 1997–1999: Westminster (MO)
- 2000: Texas A&M–Corpus Christi (asst.)

Softball
- 2002–2003: Georgia Tech (asst.)
- 2004–2006: Georgia Tech
- 2007–2017: Missouri
- 2025–2025: Ole Miss (asst.)
- 2026–2026: Texas (AHC)
- 2027–Present: Tennessee (AHC)

Administrative career (AD unless noted)
- 2018–2024: Jefferson City Public Schools

Head coaching record
- Overall: Baseball: 63–44 (.589); Softball: 658–266 (.712)

Accomplishments and honors

Championships
- Big 12 regular season (2011); Big 12 Tournament (2009); ACC regular season (2005); ACC tournament (2005)

Awards
- 2× Big 12 Coach of the Year (2007, 2011); ACC Coach of the Year (2005)

Ehren Larry Earleywine (born November 4, 1970) is an American sports coach and administrator who was the athletic director at Jefferson City High School. From 1997 to 1999, Earleywine was head baseball coach at Westminster College in Missouri. He later became a college softball head coach, first at Georgia Tech from 2004 to 2006, then at Missouri from 2007 to 2018.

== Early life and education ==
Born and raised in Jefferson City, Missouri, Earleywine played college baseball as a shortstop at Southwest Missouri State (now Missouri State) in the 1990 season, then at Westminster College in Fulton, Missouri from 1991 to 1993 before graduating with a B.S. in business administration in 1994.

== Baseball coaching career ==
From 1994 to 1996, Earleywine was an assistant coach at Westminster under former Major League Baseball player and University of Missouri alum Phil Bradley. After Bradley left the college, Earleywine became head coach at Westminster beginning in the 1997 season. Earleywine had a 63–44 cumulative record at Westminster from 1997 to 1999. In 2000, Earleywine joined Texas A&M–Corpus Christi as an assistant coach on the inaugural baseball team under head coach Hector Salinas.

== Softball playing career ==
Earleywine was a member of the United States men's national softball team in the 1998, 1999, 2002, and 2003 seasons, being team captain in the last two seasons. He earned six Amateur Softball Association All-American honors and 1999 All-World honors from the International Softball Congress. In the 2003 Pan American Games, Earleywine led the United States to a silver medal.

== Softball coaching career ==
=== Georgia Tech (2002–2006) ===
Earleywine became a softball coach, beginning in 2002 as an assistant coach at Georgia Tech under Kate Madden. Earleywine became Georgia Tech head coach after two seasons as an assistant. From 2004 to 2006, Earleywine built a cumulative 146–55 record as Georgia Tech head coach, with three consecutive NCAA Tournament appearances. In 2005, the Atlantic Coast Conference (ACC) named Earleywine the Coach of the Year in softball for winning the ACC title.

=== Missouri (2007–2017) ===
Returning to his home state, Earleywine was head coach at Missouri from 2007 to 2018, accumulating a 482–182 record. Missouri made every NCAA Tournament from 2007 to 2017, including eight Super Regional appearances (2008 to 2013, 2015, and 2016) and three consecutive Women's College World Series appearances from 2009 to 2011. In the Big 12 Conference, Earleywine led Missouri to the 2009 Big 12 Tournament title and 2011 regular season title; the Big 12 named him Coach of the Year in 2007 and 2011. Missouri moved from the Big 12 to SEC effective in the 2013 season. Missouri finished third in the SEC standings in 2013 and 2014. Despite finishing seventh in 2015 and sixth in 2016, Missouri made Super Regionals in both seasons. In 2017, which would become Earleywine's final season, the team finished one game over .500 at 29–28, eleventh in the SEC, and winless in NCAA Regionals.

Nearly two weeks before the beginning of the season, Missouri athletic director Jim Sterk fired Earleywine on January 26, 2018. In 2016, he was investigated by the athletic department and Missouri Title IX office for nearly five months after being accused by players of verbal abuse. When the 2016 season ended, seven players left the program including pitching aces Paige Lowary and Tori Finucane.

Hired in March 2018, Earleywine became athletic director for Jefferson City Public Schools on July 1, 2018.

== Head coaching record ==
=== Baseball ===
Record table
Season	Team	Overall	Conference	Standing	Postseason
Westminster Blue Jays (St. Louis Intercollegiate Athletic Conference) (1997–1999)
1997	Westminster (MO)	20–14	7–7	3rd	
1998	Westminster (MO)	19–14	11–3	T–2nd	
1999	Westminster (MO)	24–16	8–6	T–4th	
Westminster (MO):		63–44 (.589)	26–16 (.619)		
Total:		63–44 (.589)			

=== Softball ===
Record table
Season	Team	Overall	Conference	Standing	Postseason
Georgia Tech Yellow Jackets (Atlantic Coast Conference) (2004–2006)
2004	Georgia Tech	47–19	5–5	4th	NCAA Regionals
2005	Georgia Tech	51–14	11–4	1st	NCAA Regionals
2006	Georgia Tech	48–22	12–9	4th	NCAA Regionals
Georgia Tech:		146–55 (.726)	28–18 (.609)		
Missouri Tigers (Big 12 Conference) (2007–2012)
2007	Missouri	40–24	13–4	3rd	NCAA Regionals
2008	Missouri	47–17	11–6	3rd	NCAA Super Regionals
2009	Missouri	50–12	12–6	2nd	Women's College World Series
2010	Missouri	51–13	11–7	5th	Women's College World Series
2011	Missouri	53–10	15–3	1st	Women's College World Series
2012	Missouri	47–17	17–7	2nd	NCAA Super Regionals
Missouri (Big 12):		288–93 (.756)	79–33 (.705)		
Missouri Tigers (Southeastern Conference) (2013–2017)
2013	Missouri	38–14	15–8	3rd	NCAA Super Regionals
2014	Missouri	43–18	15–9	3rd	NCAA Regionals
2015	Missouri	42–16	14–10	7th	NCAA Super Regionals
2016	Missouri	42–16	14–10	6th	NCAA Super Regionals
2017	Missouri	29–28	7–16	11th	NCAA Regionals
Missouri (SEC):		194–92 (.678)	65–53 (.551)		
Total:		628–237 (.726)			
National champion Postseason invitational champion Conference regular season champion Conference regular season and conference tournament champion Division regular season champion Division regular season and conference tournament champion Conference tournament champion
