= 2006 Big Ten softball tournament =

College softball tournament in Illinois

- Teams: 8
- Format: Single-elimination
- Finals site: Sharon J. Drysdale Field; Evanston, Illinois
- Champions: Michigan (8th title)
- Runner-up: Northwestern (3rd title game)
- Winning coach: Carol Hutchins (8th title)
- MVP: Jennie Ritter (Michigan)

2006 Big Ten Conference softball standings
	Conf.				Overall
Team	W		L	PCT	W		L	PCT
No. 2 Northwestern ‍†‍‍^{y}	16	–	3	.842	50	–	15	.769
No. 10 Michigan ‍‍‡‍^{y}	14	–	4	.778	44	–	15	.746
Iowa ‍‍‍^{y}	12	–	7	.632	39	–	22	.639
Ohio State ‍‍‍^{y}	11	–	7	.611	39	–	23	.629
Penn State ‍‍‍^{y}	10	–	10	.500	39	–	17	.696
Indiana ‍‍‍^{y}	8	–	9	.471	30	–	25	.545
Michigan State ‍‍‍	9	–	11	.450	34	–	25	.576
Illinois ‍‍‍	8	–	11	.421	24	–	31	.436
Purdue ‍‍‍	7	–	12	.368	30	–	30	.500
Wisconsin ‍‍‍	6	–	11	.353	22	–	22	.500
Minnesota ‍‍‍	1	–	17	.056	17	–	33	.340
† – Conference champion ‡ – Tournament champion y – Invited to the NCAA tournament As of August 3, 2006; Rankings from NFCA

The 2006 Big Ten softball tournament was held at Sharon J. Drysdale Field on the campus of Northwestern University in Evanston, Illinois from May 12 through May 13, 2006. As the tournament winner, Michigan earned the Big Ten Conference's automatic bid to the 2006 NCAA Division I softball tournament.

== Format and seeding ==
The 2006 tournament was an eight team single-elimination tournament. The top eight teams based on conference regular season winning percentage earned invites to the tournament.

== Tournament ==
Quarterfinals; May 12
1	Northwestern	4
8	Illinois	1
4	Ohio State	9
5	Penn State	6
2	Michigan	13
7	Michigan State	0^{(5)}
3	Iowa	4^{(8)}
6	Indiana	5

Semifinals; May 13
1	Northwestern	4
4	Ohio State	0
2	Michigan	4
6	Indiana	0

Championship; May 13
1	Northwestern	0
2	Michigan	6

== Schedule ==
Game	Time*	Matchup^{#}	Attendance
Quarterfinals – May 12 and 13
1	9:00 a.m.	#2 Michigan vs. #7 Michigan State	
2	11:30 a.m.	#1 Northwestern vs. #8 Illinois	
3	12:30 p.m.	#4 Ohio State vs. #5 Penn State	
4	2:00 p.m.	#3 Iowa vs. #6 Indiana	
Semifinals – May 13
5	9:00 a.m.	#2 Michigan vs. #6 Indiana	
6	11:45 a.m.	#1 Northwestern vs. #4 Ohio State	
Championship – May 13
7	2:05 p.m.	#1 Northwestern vs. #2 Michigan	
*Game times in EDT. # – Rankings denote tournament seed.

== All-Tournament Team ==
- Designated Player: Tiffany Worthy (Michigan)
- Utility Player: Mariangee Bogado (Indiana)
- Pitcher: Courtnay Foster (Northwestern)
- Pitcher: Jennie Ritter (Michigan)
- Catcher: Becky Marx (Michigan)
- First base: Samantha Findlay (Michigan)
- Second base: Tiffany Haas (Michigan)
- Third base: Darcy Sengewald (Northwestern)
- Shortstop: Tammy Williams (Northwestern)
- Outfielder: Rebekah Milian (Michigan)
- Outfielder: Megan Schwab (Ohio State)
- Outfielder: Brittany Vanderink (Ohio State)

=== Tournament MVP ===
- Jennie Ritter (Michigan)
