= Whitney Jones (softball) =

American softball coach

Current position
- Title: Head coach
- Team: Appalachian State
- Conference: Sun Belt
- Record: 52–48 (.520)

Biographical details
- Born: Upland, California, U.S.
- Education: University of Washington ('14) University of Tulsa (Master's) ('16)

Coaching career (HC unless noted)
- 2014–2016: Tulsa (grad. asst.)
- 2017: Garfield High School
- 2018–2021: Washington (volunteer asst.)
- 2021–2022: UCF (asst.)
- 2022–2024: Ohio State (Assoc. HC)
- 2025–present: Appalachian State

Head coaching record
- Overall: 52–48 (.520)

Whitney Jones is an American college softball coach and is the current head coach of the Appalachian State Mountaineers softball team.

== Playing career ==
Jones played at Upland High School and was a two-year team captain while leading her school to a pair of league championships. While at Upland High she was a two-time Defensive Player of the Year and three-time All-League selection, adding all-area honors her junior year.

Jones committed to play college softball at the University of Washington. In four years as a player at Washington, Jones was a two-time Pac-12 All-Academic performer and was an All-Pac-12 Honorable Mention in 2014. As a player with the Washington Huskies softball team, she appeared in super regionals during the 2011, 2012, and 2014 NCAA tournaments and a Women's College World Series in the 2013 NCAA Tournament.

== Coaching career ==
Following a graduate assistantship with the athletic department at the University of Tulsa, Jones was hired as the Garfield High School softball team head coach. As Garfield High School's head coach in 2017, her squad posted a 19–8 record and made the Washington Interscholastic Activities Association state championship game. Jones was named the 3A Metro Coach of the Year.

After the 2017–2018 season at Garfield High School, Jones rejoined the Washington Huskies as a volunteer assistant coach and served in that role for four seasons. At Washington, Jones was responsible for coaching the outfielders for all four seasons of her coaching tenure. Her group hit over .300 in each of those four seasons and committed just 20 errors over that span. Her outfielders had four members named to an All-Region team and had five named to All-Pac-12 Teams. In 2021, Jones reunited with former Washington assistant Cindy Ball-Malone who was the head coach at UCF. Jones spent one season serving as an offensive assistant coach. During that season, she helped lead UCF to the program's first-ever Super Regional appearance in the 2022 NCAA tournament. From 2022 to 2024, Jones served as the associate head coach of The Ohio State Buckeyes softball team. Reflecting on her coaching philosophy in an Ohio State Black History Month profile, Jones stated, "Using my positionality for the greater good, not just stats, will be the ultimate success for me. My goal by the end of all of this is to impact change over the lives of all those I encounter."

=== Appalachian State University ===
On May 22, 2024, Jones was announced as the new head coach of the Appalachian State Mountaineers softball team.

In her first year with the Mountaineers, Jones led the team to its first Sun Belt Conference softball tournament appearance since 2022, tied the program record for most regular season Sun Belt Conference wins, and oversaw a record-setting offensive performance as the team hit 54 home runs during the regular season—a new program best.

== Personal life ==
Jones is the daughter of Carl Jones who played Triple-A baseball in the Atlanta Braves organization from 1986 to 1988.

== Head coaching record ==
=== NCAA DI ===
Record table
Season	Team	Overall	Conference	Standing	Postseason
Appalachian State (Sun Belt Conference) (2024–present)
2025	Appalachian State	23–27	13-11	7th	Sun Belt Conference softball tournament
2026	Appalachian State	29–21	8-16	11th	
Appalachian State:		52–48 (.520)	21–27 (.438)		
Total:		52–48 (.520)			
National champion Postseason invitational champion Conference regular season champion Conference regular season and conference tournament champion Division regular season champion Division regular season and conference tournament champion Conference tournament champion
