= Big 12 Conference Softball Coach of the Year =

Big 12 Conference Coach of the Year
- Awarded for: the most outstanding college softball coach in the Big 12 Conference
- Country: United States

History
- First award: 1996-present
- Most wins: Patty Gasso (15 times)
- Most recent: Gerry Glasco, Texas Tech

The Big 12 Conference Softball Coach of the Year is a college softball award given to the Big 12 Conference's most outstanding coach. The award has been given annually since 1996.

== Winners ==
Season	Player	School	Reference
1996	Patty Gasso	Oklahoma	
1997	Jay Miller	Missouri	
1998	Rhonda Revelle	Nebraska	
1999	Patty Gasso (2)	Oklahoma	
2000	Patty Gasso (3)	Oklahoma	
2001	Rhonda Revelle (2)	Nebraska	
2002	Connie Clark	Texas	
2003	Ty Singleton	Missouri	
2004	Jo Evans	Texas A&M	
2005	Jo Evans (2)	Texas A&M	
2006	Connie Clark (2)	Texas	
2007	Ehren Earleywine	Missouri	
2008	Jo Evans (3)	Texas A&M	
2009	Patty Gasso (4)	Oklahoma	
2010	Connie Clark (3)	Texas	
2011	Ehren Earleywine (2)	Missouri	
2012	Patty Gasso (5)	Oklahoma	
2013	Patty Gasso (6)	Oklahoma	
2014	Patty Gasso (7)	Oklahoma	
2015	Patty Gasso (8)	Oklahoma	
2016	Patty Gasso (9)	Oklahoma	
2017	Patty Gasso (10)	Oklahoma	
2018	Patty Gasso (11)	Oklahoma	
2019	Patty Gasso (12)	Oklahoma	
2021	Patty Gasso (13)	Oklahoma	
2022	Patty Gasso (14)	Oklahoma	
2023	Patty Gasso (15); Glenn Moore	Oklahoma; Baylor	
2024	Mike White	Texas	
2025	Gerry Glasco	Texas Tech	
2026	Gerry Glasco (2)	Texas Tech	

== Winners by school ==
School	Winners	Years
Oklahoma	15	1996, 1999, 2000, 2009, 2012, 2013, 2014, 2015, 2016, 2017, 2018, 2019, 2021, 2022, 2023
Missouri	4	1997, 2003, 2007, 2011
Texas	4	2002, 2006, 2010, 2024
Texas A&M	3	2004, 2005, 2008
Nebraska	2	1998, 2001
Texas Tech	2	2025, 2026
Baylor	1	2023
Arizona	0	—
Arizona State	0	—
BYU	0	—
Iowa State	0	—
Kansas	0	—
Oklahoma State	0	—
UCF	0	—
