= Aileen Morales =

American softball coach

Current position
- Title: Head coach
- Team: Georgia Tech
- Conference: ACC
- Record: 246–211 (.538)

Biographical details
- Born: April 5, 1987 (age 39); Columbus, Georgia, U.S.
- Education: Georgia Tech

Playing career
- 2005–2008: Georgia Tech
- 2007–2010: Puerto Rico National Team
- Position: Shortstop

Coaching career (HC unless noted)

College Softball
- 2009: Georgia Tech (Student asst.)
- 2010–2013: Georgia Tech (asst.)
- 2014–2015: Young Harris
- 2016–2017: Radford
- 2018–present: Georgia Tech

National Softball
- 2012: Puerto Rico National Team (asst.)

Head coaching record
- Overall: 359–316 (.532)

Aileen Rae Morales (born April 5, 1987) is an American softball coach who is the current head coach at Georgia Tech.

== Coaching career ==
=== Young Harris ===
On June 18, 2013, Aileen Morales was announced as the new head coach of the Young Harris softball program.

=== Radford ===
On June 26, 2015, Aileen Morales was announced as the new head coach of the Radford softball program.

=== Georgia Tech ===
On June 7, 2017, Aileen Morales was announced as the new head coach of the Georgia Tech softball program.

== Head coaching record ==
=== College ===
Record table
| Season | Team | Overall | Conference | Standing | Postseason |
|---|---|---|---|---|---|
Young Harris Mountain Lions (Peach Belt Conference) (2014–2015)
| 2014 | Young Harris | 20–33 | 8–12 | 10th | |
| 2015 | Young Harris | 31–18 | 14–10 | 5th | |
| Young Harris: | | 51–51 (.500) | 22–22 (.500) | | |
Radford Highlanders (Big South Conference) (2016–2017)
| 2016 | Radford | 35–26 | 13–11 | 4th | |
| 2017 | Radford | 27–28 | 8–13 | 6th | |
| Radford: | | 62–54 (.534) | 21–24 (.467) | | |
Georgia Tech (Atlantic Coast Conference) (2018–Present)
| 2018 | Georgia Tech | 28–26 | 13–11 | T-3rd (Coastal) | |
| 2019 | Georgia Tech | 31–27 | 11–13 | 4th (Coastal) | |
| 2020 | Georgia Tech | 12–11 | 2–1 | T-4th | Season canceled due to COVID-19 |
| 2021 | Georgia Tech | 20–26 | 15–17 | 9th | |
| 2022 | Georgia Tech | 38–18 | 11–13 | 7th | NCAA Regional |
| 2023 | Georgia Tech | 26–27 | 7–17 | 10th | |
| 2024 | Georgia Tech | 32–23 | 12–12 | 6th | |
| 2025 | Georgia Tech | 27–24 | 10–11 | 8th | NCAA Regional |
| 2026 | Georgia Tech | 32-29 | 10-14 | | NCAA Regional |
| Georgia Tech: | | 246–211 (.538) | 92–107 (.462) | | |
| Total: | | 359–316 (.532) | | | |
National champion Postseason invitational champion Conference regular season champion Conference regular season and conference tournament champion Division regular season champion Division regular season and conference tournament champion Conference tournament champion
