= Georgia Tech Yellow Jackets softball =

Softball team in the Georgia Institute of Technology

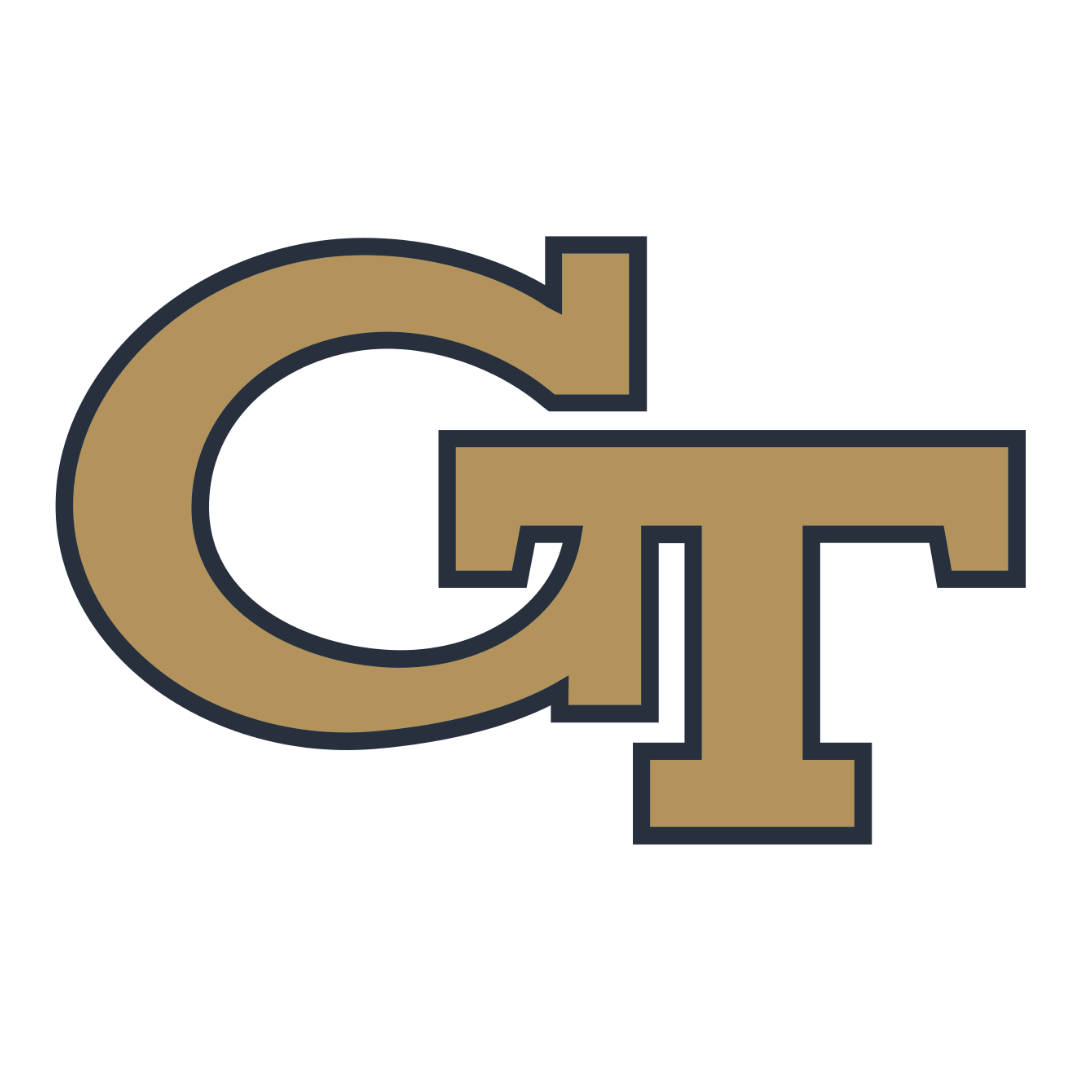
- Founded: 1987
- University: Georgia Institute of Technology
- Head coach: Aileen Morales (7th season)
- Conference: ACC
- Location: Atlanta, Georgia, US
- Home stadium: Shirley Clements Mewborn Field (capacity: 1500)
- Nickname: Yellow Jackets
- Colors: Gold and white

NCAA super regional appearances
- 2009

NCAA Tournament appearances
- 2002, 2003, 2004, 2005, 2006, 2007, 2008, 2009, 2010, 2011, 2012, 2022, 2025, 2026

Conference tournament championships
- 2002, 2005, 2009, 2010, 2012

Regular-season conference championships
- 2005, 2009, 2010, 2011

The Georgia Tech Yellow Jackets softball team represents Georgia Institute of Technology in NCAA Division I college softball. The team participates in the Atlantic Coast Conference. The Yellow Jackets are currently led by head coach Aileen Morales. The team plays its home games at Shirley Clements Mewborn Field located on the university's campus.

== History ==
=== Coaching history ===
Years	Coach	Record	%
1987-1990	No Coach	52-107-1	.325
1991-1998	Regina Tomaselli	239-193-1	.553
1999-2003	Kate Madden	161-143	.530
2004-2006	Ehren Earleywine	146-55	.726
2007-2013	Sharon Perkins	290-138	.678
2014-2017	Shelly Hoerner	80-125	.390
2018-Present	Aileen Morales	187–158	.542

== Championships ==
=== Conference Championships ===
Season	Conference	Record	Head coach
2005	Atlantic Coast Conference	11-4	Ehren Earleywine
2009	Atlantic Coast Conference	17-3	Sharon Perkins
2010	Atlantic Coast Conference	19-2	Sharon Perkins
2011	Atlantic Coast Conference	18-2	Sharon Perkins

=== Conference Tournament Championships ===
Year	Conference	Tournament Location	Head coach
2002	Atlantic Coast Conference	Tallahassee, FL	Kate Madden
2005	Atlantic Coast Conference	College Park, MD	Ehren Earleywine
2009	Atlantic Coast Conference	Raleigh, NC	Sharon Perkins
2010	Atlantic Coast Conference	Blacksburg, VA	Sharon Perkins
2012	Atlantic Coast Conference	Chapel Hill, NC	Sharon Perkins

== Coaching staff ==
Name	Position coached	Consecutive season at Georgia Tech in current position
Aileen Morales	Head coach	2nd
Reese Mariconda	Assistant coach	2nd
Alison Owen	Assistant coach	2nd
Elicia D’Orazio	Graduate Manager	1st
Zach Basel	Undergraduate Manager	
Casen Wolinsky	Undergraduate Manager	

== Awards and honors ==
=== Conference awards and honors ===
==== ACC Player of the Year ====
- Laura Williams, 1997
- Jen Yee, 2010
- Kelsi Weseman, 2011, 2012
- Ashley Thomas, 2013

==== ACC Pitcher of the Year ====
- Jessica Sallinger, 2005

==== ACC Freshman of the Year ====
- Stephanie Weitman, 1992
- Laura Williams, 1994
- Anne Knobbe, 1997
- Jessica Sallinger, 2002
- Aileen Morales, 2005
- Whitney Haller, 2006
- Kelsi Weseman, 2009
- Hope Rush, 2010
