= 2006 NCAA Division I softball tournament =

- Teams: 64
- Finals site: ASA Hall of Fame Stadium; Oklahoma City, Oklahoma
- Champions: Arizona (7th title)
- Runner-up: Northwestern (4th WCWS Appearance)
- Winning coach: Mike Candrea (7th title)
- MOP: Alicia Hollowell (Arizona)

The 2006 NCAA Division I softball tournament was the twenty-fifth annual tournament to determine the national champion of NCAA women's collegiate softball. Held during May and June 2006, sixty-four Division I college softball teams contested the championship. The tournament featured eight regionals of eight teams, each in a double elimination format. The 2006 Women's College World Series was held in Oklahoma City, Oklahoma from June 1 through June 6 and marked the conclusion of the 2006 NCAA Division I softball season. Arizona won their seventh championship by defeating Northwestern two games to none in the championship series. Arizona pitcher Alicia Hollowell was named Women's College World Series Most Outstanding Player.

== Regionals ==
=== Austin Super Regional ===
First round	Regional semifinals
Texas	4
UTSA	0
Texas	3
Indiana	0
Indiana	3
Utah	0
Austin Regional - Red and Charline McCombs Field
UTSA	2
Utah	3
Indiana	1
Utah	5
BYU	0
Kansas	3
Kansas	0
Washington	6
Washington	8^{5}
Southern Utah	0
Provo Regional - Gail Miller Field
BYU	5
Southern Utah	4
Kansas	2
BYU	1

Regional Finals
Texas	3	X
Utah	0	X
Washington	3	X
Kansas	0	X

Super Regionals
Texas	1	9^{6}	X
Washington	0	1	X

=== Corvallis Super Regional ===
Round of 16	Quarterfinals
Oregon State	2
Nevada	1
Oregon State	5
Baylor	3
Baylor	5
Portland State	3
Corvallis Regional - OSU Softball Complex
Nevada	1
Portland State	2
Baylor	3
Portland State	2
Iowa	0
Nebraska	1^{10}
Nebraska	2
California	4
California	1
Illinois State	0
Iowa City Regional - Bob Pearl Softball Field
Iowa	2
Illinois State	3
Nebraska	3
Illinois State	1

Semifinals
Oregon State	3	X
Baylor	1	X
California	6	X
Nebraska	1	X

Finals
Oregon State	1	3	1
California	2	0	0

=== Evanston Super Regional ===
Round of 16	Quarterfinals
Northwestern	4
Southern Illinois	0
Northwestern	9^{5}
Notre Dame	0
Notre Dame	5
UC Santa Barbara	2
Evanston Regional - Sharon J. Drysdale Field
Southern Illinois	2
UC Santa Barbara	1
Notre Dame	5
Southern Illinois	4
UMass	2
Albany	0
UMass	6^{10}
Lehigh	4
Texas A&M	3
Lehigh	4
Amherst Regional - UMass Softball Complex
Albany	5
Texas A&M	6
Lehigh	4
Texas A&M	3

Semifinals
Northwestern	7	X
Notre Dame	4	X
UMass	3	X
Lehigh	0	X

Finals
Northwestern	0	4	9^{5}
UMass	1	2	0

=== Knoxville Super Regional ===
Round of 16	Quarterfinals
Tennessee	6
Tennessee Tech	4
Tennessee	9^{5}
Virginia Tech	1
Virginia Tech	1^{12}
Louisville	0
Knoxville Regional - Tyson Park
Tennessee Tech	0
Louisville	3
Virginia Tech	1
Louisville	10^{5}
Michigan	4
Youngstown State	0
Michigan	1^{9}
Oklahoma	0
Oklahoma	1
Kent State	0
Ann Arbor Regional - Alumni Field
Youngstown State	0
Kent State	8^{5}
Oklahoma	9^{5}
Kent State	1

Semifinals
Tennessee	8	X
Louisville	1	X
Michigan	5^{8}	X
Oklahoma	2	X

Finals
Tennessee	5	1	1
Michigan	3	5	0

=== Los Angeles Super Regional ===
Round of 16	Quarterfinals
UCLA	11^{6}
Missouri State	2
UCLA	5
Long Beach State	0
Long Beach State	1
San Diego State	0
Los Angeles Regional - Easton Stadium
Missouri State	0
San Diego State	1
Long Beach State	1
San Diego State	3
Florida	0
Florida Atlantic	2
Florida Atlantic	0
South Florida	1
South Florida	2
North Carolina	1
Gainesville Regional - Katie Seashole Pressly Softball Stadium
Florida	1
North Carolina	0
Florida Atlantic	1
Florida	0

Semifinals
UCLA	7	X
San Diego State	0	X
South Florida	7	X
Florida Atlantic	4	X

Finals
UCLA	2	3	X
South Florida	0	1	X

=== Tempe Super Regional ===
Round of 16	Quarterfinals
Hofstra	5
Penn State	4
Hofstra	0
Arizona State	2^{8}
Arizona State	6
LIU Brooklyn	0
Hempstead Regional - Bill Edwards Stadium
Penn State	2
LIU Brooklyn	1
Hofstra	2
Penn State	9
Georgia	4
Georgia Southern	0
Georgia	2
Florida State	3
Florida State	7
Coastal Carolina	2
Athens Regional - Jack Turner Stadium
Georgia Southern	2
Coastal Carolina	1
Georgia	11
Georgia Southern	6

Semifinals
Arizona State	5	X
Penn State	0	X
Florida State	1	2
Georgia	3	0

Finals
Arizona State	6	5	X
Florida State	1	1	X

=== Tucson Super Regional ===
Round of 16	Quarterfinals
Arizona	9^{6}
Marist	0
Arizona	6
Ohio State	3
Ohio State	1^{10}
Auburn	0
Tucson Regional - Rita Hillenbrand Memorial Stadium
Marist	0
Auburn	14^{5}
Ohio State	0
Auburn	4
LSU	5
Princeton	0
LSU	7^{10}
Louisiana–Lafayette	6
NC State	0
Louisiana–Lafayette	2
Baton Rouge Regional - Tiger Park
Princeton	0
NC State	1
Louisiana–Lafayette	4^{9}
NC State	3

Semifinals
Arizona	4	X
Auburn	2	X
LSU	5	X
Louisiana–Lafayette	4	X

Finals
Arizona	5	2	14^{5}
LSU	0	3	5

=== Tuscaloosa Super Regional ===
Round of 16	Quarterfinals
Alabama	8^{5}
Mississippi Valley State	0
Alabama	8
Georgia Tech	5
Georgia Tech	9
Florida A&M	3
Tuscaloosa Regional - Rhoads Stadium
Mississippi Valley State	5
Florida A&M	7
Georgia Tech	10
Florida A&M	7
Fresno State	2
Cal State Fullerton	0
Fresno State	3
Stanford	0
Stanford	8^{5}
Tulsa	0
Fresno Regional - Margie Wright Diamond
Cal State Fullerton	6
Tulsa	2
Stanford	4
Cal State Fullerton	1

Semifinals
Alabama	7	X
Georgia Tech	2	X
Fresno State	3	0
Stanford	9	3

Finals
Alabama	4	8^{8}	X
Stanford	1	7	X

== Women's College World Series ==
=== Bracket ===
First round
2	Arizona	3^{9}
7	Oregon State	2
3	Texas	2
6	Arizona State	0
6	Arizona State	3
7	Oregon State	1
4	Northwestern	6^{10}
5	Alabama	5
8	Tennessee	4
1	UCLA	3
1	UCLA	4
5	Alabama	1

Second round
2	Arizona	2
3	Texas	0
6	Arizona State	1
8	Tennessee	3
4	Northwestern	2
8	Tennessee	0
1	UCLA	2
3	Texas	0

Semifinals
2	Arizona	0	6
8	Tennessee	1	0
4	Northwestern	3^{8}	—
1	UCLA	1	—

Finals
2	Arizona	8	5	—
4	Northwestern	0	0	—

=== Game results ===
Date	Game	Winner	Score	Loser
June 1, 2006	Game 1	Arizona	3–2 (9 inn)	Oregon State
June 1, 2006	Game 2	Texas	2–0	Arizona State
June 1, 2006	Game 3	Northwestern	6–5 (10 inn)	Alabama
June 1, 2006	Game 4	Tennessee	4–2	UCLA
June 2, 2006	Game 5	Arizona	2–0	Texas
June 2, 2006	Game 6	Northwestern	2–0	Tennessee
June 3, 2006	Game 7	Arizona State	3–1	Oregon State
June 3, 2006	Game 8	UCLA	4–1	Alabama
June 3, 2006	Game 9	Tennessee	3–1	Arizona State
June 3, 2006	Game 10	UCLA	2–0	Texas
June 4, 2006	Game 11	Tennessee	1–0	Arizona
June 4, 2006	Game 12	Northwestern	3–1 (8 inn)	UCLA
June 4, 2006	Game 13	Arizona	6–0	Tennessee
June 5, 2006	Finals Game 1	Arizona	8–0	Northwestern
June 6, 2006	Finals Game 2	Arizona	6–0	Northwestern

==== Championship game ====
School	Top Batter	Stats.
Arizona	Autumn Champion (LF)	3-4 2RBIs K
Northwestern	Katie Logan (LF)	3-4 2B K

School	Pitcher	IP	H	R	ER	BB	SO	AB	BF
Arizona	Alicia Hollowell (W)	7.0	9	0	0	1	13	30	31
Northwestern	Eileen Canney (L)	6.0	12	5	4	0	4	29	30

=== All Tournament Team ===
The following players were members of the All-Tournament Team.

- Monica Abbott, Tennessee
- Eileen Canney, Northwestern
- Autumn Champion, Arizona
- Garland Cooper, Northwestern
- Andrea Duran, UCLA
- Kristi Durant, Tennessee
- Alicia Hollowell, Arizona
- Caitlin Lowe, Arizona
- Heidi Knabe, Arizona State
- Taryne Mowatt, Arizona
- Cat Osterman, Texas
- Tammy Williams, Northwestern
