= 2006 NCAA Division I softball season =

American college softball season

- Defending Champions: Michigan

Tournament

Women's College World Series
- Champions: Arizona (7th title)
- Runners-up: Northwestern (4th WCWS Appearance)
- Winning Coach: Mike Candrea (7th title)
- WCWS MOP: Alicia Hollowell (Arizona)

Seasons
- ← 2005 2007 →

The 2006 NCAA Division I softball season, play of college softball in the United States organized by the National Collegiate Athletic Association (NCAA) at the Division I level, began in February 2006. The season progressed through the regular season, many conference tournaments and championship series, and concluded with the 2006 NCAA Division I softball tournament and 2006 Women's College World Series. The Women's College World Series, consisting of the eight remaining teams in the NCAA Tournament and held in Oklahoma City at ASA Hall of Fame Stadium, ended on June 6, 2006.

== Conference standings ==
2006 Big 12 Conference softball standings
	Conf.						Overall
Team	W		L		T	PCT	W		L		T	PCT
No. 5 Texas ‍†‍‍^{y}	15	–	2	–	0	.882	55	–	9	–	0	.859
No. 14 Nebraska ‍‍‍^{y}	13	–	4	–	0	.765	44	–	12	–	0	.786
No. 20 Baylor ‍‍‍^{y}	12	–	6	–	0	.667	38	–	22	–	0	.633
No. 22 Texas A&M ‍‍‍^{y}	11	–	6	–	0	.647	34	–	19	–	0	.642
No. 19 Oklahoma ‍‍‡‍^{y}	8	–	10	–	0	.444	40	–	21	–	1	.653
Kansas ‍‍‍^{y}	8	–	10	–	0	.444	36	–	26	–	0	.581
Missouri ‍‍‍	7	–	11	–	0	.389	26	–	27	–	0	.491
Oklahoma State ‍‍‍	5	–	13	–	0	.278	21	–	29	–	0	.420
Iowa State ‍‍‍	5	–	13	–	0	.278	23	–	28	–	0	.451
Texas Tech ‍‍‍	4	–	13	–	0	.235	19	–	35	–	0	.352
† – Conference champion ‡ – Tournament champion y – Invited to the NCAA tournament Rankings from NFCA

2006 Big Ten Conference softball standings
	Conf.				Overall
Team	W		L	PCT	W		L	PCT
No. 2 Northwestern ‍†‍‍^{y}	16	–	3	.842	50	–	15	.769
No. 10 Michigan ‍‍‡‍^{y}	14	–	4	.778	44	–	15	.746
Iowa ‍‍‍^{y}	12	–	7	.632	39	–	22	.639
Ohio State ‍‍‍^{y}	11	–	7	.611	39	–	23	.629
Penn State ‍‍‍^{y}	10	–	10	.500	39	–	17	.696
Indiana ‍‍‍^{y}	8	–	9	.471	30	–	25	.545
Michigan State ‍‍‍	9	–	11	.450	34	–	25	.576
Illinois ‍‍‍	8	–	11	.421	24	–	31	.436
Purdue ‍‍‍	7	–	12	.368	30	–	30	.500
Wisconsin ‍‍‍	6	–	11	.353	22	–	22	.500
Minnesota ‍‍‍	1	–	17	.056	17	–	33	.340
† – Conference champion ‡ – Tournament champion y – Invited to the NCAA tournament As of August 3, 2006; Rankings from NFCA

2006 Pacific-10 Conference softball standings
	Conf.				Overall
Team	W		L	PCT	W		L	PCT
UCLA ‍†‍‍^{y}	15	–	5	.750	50	–	9	.847
Arizona ‍‍‍^{y}	15	–	6	.714	54	–	11	.831
California ‍‍‍^{y}	12	–	9	.571	48	–	14	.774
Arizona State ‍‍‍^{y}	11	–	10	.524	53	–	15	.779
Oregon State ‍‍‍^{y}	10	–	10	.500	43	–	16	.729
Stanford ‍‍‍^{y}	10	–	11	.476	42	–	18	.700
Washington ‍‍‍^{y}	6	–	15	.286	35	–	25	.583
Oregon ‍‍‍	4	–	17	.190	24	–	29	.453
† – Conference champion y – Invited to the NCAA tournament As of June 6, 2006; Rankings from Coaches' Poll

2006 Southland Conference softball standings
	Conf.						Overall
Team	W		L		T	PCT	W		L		T	PCT
Texas–San Antonio ‍†‍‍^{y}	22	–	5	–	0	.815	37	–	14	–	0	.725
Texas State ‍‍‍	18	–	5	–	0	.783	34	–	22	–	0	.607
Texas–Arlington ‍‍‍	16	–	9	–	0	.640	32	–	22	–	0	.593
McNeese State ‍‍‍	13	–	13	–	0	.500	21	–	30	–	0	.412
Northwestern State ‍‍‍	12	–	13	–	0	.480	28	–	32	–	0	.467
Nicholls State ‍‍‍	11	–	15	–	0	.423	23	–	33	–	0	.411
Sam Houston State ‍‍‍	11	–	16	–	0	.407	18	–	30	–	0	.375
Louisiana–Monroe ‍‍‍	10	–	16	–	0	.385	27	–	30	–	0	.474
Stephen F. Austin ‍‍‍	9	–	15	–	0	.375	20	–	28	–	0	.417
Southeastern Louisiana ‍‍‍	6	–	21	–	0	.222	10	–	36	–	0	.217
† – Conference champion y – Invited to the NCAA tournament As of May 20, 2006; Rankings from Coaches' Poll

== Women's College World Series ==
The 2006 NCAA Women's College World Series took place from June 1 to June 6, 2006 in Oklahoma City.

First round
2	Arizona	3^{9}
7	Oregon State	2
3	Texas	2
6	Arizona State	0
6	Arizona State	3
7	Oregon State	1
4	Northwestern	6^{10}
5	Alabama	5
8	Tennessee	4
1	UCLA	3
1	UCLA	4
5	Alabama	1

Second round
2	Arizona	2
3	Texas	0
6	Arizona State	1
8	Tennessee	3
4	Northwestern	2
8	Tennessee	0
1	UCLA	2
3	Texas	0

Semifinals
2	Arizona	0	6
8	Tennessee	1	0
4	Northwestern	3^{8}	—
1	UCLA	1	—

Finals
2	Arizona	8	5	—
4	Northwestern	0	0	—

== Season leaders ==
Batting

- Batting average: .500 – Sarah Fekete, Tennessee Volunteers
- RBIs: 82 – Melanie Denischuk, UMBC Retrievers & Ianeta Le'i, BYU Cougars
- Home runs: 30 – Danyele Gomez, Louisiana Ragin' Cajuns

Pitching

- Wins: 44-10 – Monica Abbott, Tennessee Volunteers softball
- ERA: 0.41 (17 ER/286.0 IP) – Cat Osterman Texas Longhorns
- Strikeouts: 630 – Cat Osterman Texas Longhorns

== Records ==
NCAA Division I season grand slams: 6 – Serena Settlemier, Kansas Jayhawks

NCAA Division I season strikeout ratio: 15.4 (630 SO/286.0 IP) – Cat Osterman, Texas Longhorns

NCAA Division I 7 inning single game combined strikeouts: 34 – Katie Burkhart, Arizona State Sun Devils (15) & Danielle Lawrie, Washington Huskies (19). April 28, 2006

Sophomore class single game strikeouts: 26 – Angela Tincher, Virginia Tech Hokies; March 3, 2006

Freshman class strikeout ratio: 13.4 (221 SO/115.2 IP) – Cassie Cervantes, Sacramento State Hornets

Junior class triples: 14 – Marci Pratt, Southern Utah Thunderbirds

Senior class WHIP: 0.42 (78 H+43 BB/286.0 IP) – Cat Osterman, Texas Longhorns

== Awards ==
- USA Softball Collegiate Player of the Year:

Cat Osterman, Texas Longhorns

- Honda Sports Award Softball:

Cat Osterman, Texas Longhorns

- Best Female College Athlete ESPY Award

Cat Osterman, Texas Longhorns

YEAR	W	L	GP	GS	CG	SHO	SV	IP	H	R	ER	BB	SO	ERA	WHIP
2006	38	4	47	39	36	28	2	286.0	78	19	17	43	630	0.41	0.42

== All America Teams ==
The following players were members of the All-American Teams.

First Team

Position	Player	Class	School
P	Monica Abbott	JR.	Tennessee Lady Vols
P	Cat Osterman	SR.	Texas Longhorns
P	Jennie Ritter	SR.	Michigan Wolverines
C	Haley Woods	SR.	California Golden Bears
1B	Jenna Hall	SR.	Illinois Fighting Illini
2B	Veronica Wootson	JR.	FSU Seminoles
3B	Andrea Duran	SR.	UCLA Bruins
SS	Lindsay Schutzler	JR.	Tennessee Lady Vols
OF	Sarah Fekete	SR.	Tennessee Lady Vols
OF	Danyele Gomez	SR.	ULL Ragin' Cajuns
OF	Kaitlin Cochran	FR.	Arizona State Sun Devils
DP	Kristi Durant	SR.	Tennessee Lady Vols
UT	Cambria Miranda	SO.	Oregon State Beavers
AT-L	Kristie Fox	JR.	Arizona Wildcats
AT-L	Tonya Callahan	SO.	Tennessee Lady Vols
AT-L	Caitlin Lowe	JR.	Arizona Wildcats
AT-L	Anjelica Selden	SO.	UCLA Bruins
AT-L	Kristin Vesely	SR.	Oklahoma Sooners

Second Team

Position	Player	Class	School
P	Angela Tincher	SO.	Virginia Tech Hokies
P	Alicia Hollowell	SR.	Arizona Wildcats
P	Kristina Thorson	SR.	California Golden Bears
C	Rachel Folden	SO.	Marshall Thundering Herd
1B	Ianeta Le'i	SR.	BYU Cougars
2B	Caitlin Benyi	SR.	UCLA Bruins
3B	Brette Reagan	FR.	Baylor Bears
SS	Christina Clark	SR.	Fresno State Bulldogs
OF	Norrelle Dickson	JR.	Oklahoma Sooners
OF	Kellie Middleton	JR.	Georgia Bulldogs
OF	Lindy Winkler	SR.	Sacramento State Hornets
DP	Jessica Strickland	JR.	Colorado State Rams
UT	Serena Settlemier	SR.	Kansas Jayhawks
AT-L	Eileen Canney	JR.	Northwestern Wildcats
AT-L	Gina Carbonatto	JR.	Pacific Tigers
AT-L	Alexis Switenko	SR.	Syracuse Orange
AT-L	Stephanie VanBrakle	SR.	Alabama Crimson Tide
AT-L	Jackie Wong	SR.	Utah Utes

Third Team

Position	Player	Class	School
P	Brianne McGowan	SR.	Oregon State Beavers
P	Emily Turner	JR.	LSU Tigers
P	Crystal Cox	SR.	North Carolina Tar Heels
C	Becky Marx	SR.	Michigan Wolverines
1B	Garland Cooper	JR.	Northwestern Wildcats
2B	Dominique Lastrapes	JR.	Washington Huskies
3B	Meghan McAllister	JR.	Georgia Bulldogs
SS	Tammy Williams	FR.	Northwestern Wildcats
OF	Catalina Morris	SR.	Stanford Cardinal
OF	Stephanie Brown	JR.	Notre Dame Fighting Irish
OF	Brittany Rogers	FR.	Alabama Crimson Tide
DP	Amber Smith	FR.	Illinois State Redbirds
UT	Jessica Doucette	SO.	Georgia Bulldogs
AT-L	Leslie Klein	JR.	LSU Tigers
AT-L	Lacy Wood	SR.	Louisville Cardinals
AT-L	Ashley Charters	SO.	Washington Huskies
AT-L	Erin Floros	FR.	San Diego State Aztecs
AT-L	Chelsi Lake	JR.	Baylor Bears
