= Missouri Tigers softball =

Missouri Tigers
- 2026 Missouri Tigers softball team
- Founded: 1975 (50 years ago)
- University: University of Missouri
- Head coach: Larissa Anderson (6th season)
- Conference: SEC
- Location: Columbia, Missouri, US
- Home stadium: Mizzou Softball Stadium (capacity: 4,000+)
- Nickname: Tigers
- Colors: Black and gold

NCAA WCWS appearances
- 1983, 1991, 1994, 2009, 2010, 2011

AIAW WCWS appearances
- 1981

NCAA super regional appearances
- 2008, 2009, 2010, 2011, 2012, 2013, 2015, 2016, 2021, 2024

NCAA Tournament appearances
- 1982, 1983, 1991, 1994, 1995, 1997, 1999, 2003, 2004, 2005, 2007, 2008, 2009, 2010, 2011, 2012, 2013, 2014, 2015, 2016, 2017, 2018, 2019, 2021, 2022, 2023, 2024

Conference tournament championships
- 1983, 1991, 1997, 2009

Regular-season conference championships
- 1991, 1997, 2011

The Missouri Tigers softball team is the team that represents the University of Missouri in NCAA Division I college softball. The team is coached currently by their head coach Larissa Anderson, she was hired on May 26, 2018.

== History ==
=== Early history (1975–1987) ===
In response to the passage of Title IX in 1972, Missouri began sponsoring women's softball, women's basketball, and women's track & field, women's swimming, women's volleyball, women's tennis, women's golf, and women's field hockey during the 1974–1975 academic year. Alexis Jarrett was the first women's softball coach at Missouri, also coaching the women's basketball (1974–1975) and women's track and field teams (including cross-country) from 1974–1977 while serving as the women's assistant director of athletics (1974–1976) and sports information director for the eight women's sports (1974-1977). Jarrett would have success, going 14–7 in both years at the helm for a .667 win percentage and finishing 2nd in the 1975 and 1976 AIAW State Championship. The 1975 team also finished sixth in the unofficial Big Eight Championship held at Kansas State.

For the next four years, Missouri would continue to have moderate success under head coach Debbie Duren, peaking in 1980 with a 2nd place finish in the Big 8 Tournament and a 5th place finish in the AIAW Region 6 Championship.

Barb Preist took over as head coach in 1981 and led Missouri to greater heights, including a 5th place finish in its first appearance in the Women's College World Series in 1981. In 1982, Preist led Missouri to an appearance in Mideast Regional in the inaugural NCAA Division I tournament.

Joyce Compton took over for Preist after the 1982 season and in her first season as head coach led Missouri to its first Big 8 Tournament Championship and to its second appearance in the Women's College World Series. The 1980–1983 teams were led by Missouri's all-time wins and shutouts leader and 1983 All-America Teresa Wilson. After Wilson's departure, Compton was unable to build off of that 1983 season, failing to reach the NCAA Tournament in each of her next three years before accepting the head coach position at the University of South Carolina. Compton was replaced for one season by Rhesa Sumrell, under whom Missouri would suffer their only losing season between 1979 and 2002. Missouri has had only three losing seasons (1978, 1979 and 1987).

=== The Miller era (1988–2002) ===
Jay Miller was brought in as Missouri's 6th head coach in 1988. After three years of a fair amount of success, the Tigers had a breakout year in 1991 behind All-American pitcher Karen Snelgrove, supported by offensive and defensive stars Karen Schneider, Kellie Leach, Jill Brent, Tiffany Heick and Rechelle Johnson winning both the Big 8 Championship and Big 8 Tournament Championship and reaching the WCWS for the third time in school history. Anchored by sluggers Mary Babb and Barb Wright, Miller would go on to lead Missouri to its fourth WCWS appearance in 1994, as well as Missouri's first Big 12 Championship in 1997. All in all, in his 15 years as head coach, 10 different Missouri players would earn All-American honors under Miller.

=== The Singleton years (2003–2006) ===
Ty Singleton took over as head coach in 2003. Missouri had moderate success under Singleton, earning three straight trips to the NCAA Tournament from 2003–2005 but failing to make it past the Regional stage and unable to win any conference championships. Singleton did earn Big 12 Coach of the Year honors in 2003 but ultimately was let go in 2006 following just Missouri's third losing season since 1979.

=== The Earleywine legacy (2007–2018) ===
In 2007, Missouri lured Jefferson City native and 2005 ACC Coach of the Year Ehren Earleywine away from the Georgia Tech Yellow Jackets. Earleywine would earn Big 12 Coach of the Year honors in his first season and again in 2011.

In 2008, in winning the Iowa City Regional, Earlywhine led Missouri to its first ever Super Regional appearance, where the Tigers fell to the Alabama Crimson Tide. In 2009, Missouri would win the Big 12 Tournament and defeat the UCLA Bruins en route to the 2009 Women's College World Series, Missouri's first WCWS appearance since 1994. Missouri would host a Super Regional for the first time in 2010, defeating the Oregon Ducks to advance to the 2010 Women's College World Series. In 2011, Missouri won the Big 12 Championship for the second time and defeated the Washington Huskies on the way to the 2011 Women's College World Series, Missouri's third consecutive trip. In Missouri's last season as a member of the Big 12 in 2012, Missouri fell just short of a fourth consecutive WCWS appearance, losing to the LSU Tigers in the Super Regionals.

From 2008–2013, Earleywine led Missouri to six straight Super Regionals. From 2009–2011, Earleywine led Missouri to back-to-back-to-back WCWS appearances.

In seven seasons under Earleywine, six different players have earned All-American honors and three players, Rhea Taylor (2008, 2010, 2011), Ashley Fleming (2011, 2012), and Chelsea Thomas (2011, 2012, 2013), have earned multiple All-American honors. Thomas won conference pitcher of the year honors three times (twice in the Big 12, once in the SEC) and was a Top 3 finalist for USA Softball Player of the Year honors in 2011.

Earleywine was fired from Missouri on January 26, 2018, less than two weeks before the 2018 regular season was set to begin. Gina Fogue replaced Earleywine as head coach on an interim basis; she led the Tigers to a 30-29 record during the 2018 season, but was not retained following the year.

=== The Anderson tenure (2018–present) ===
Larissa Anderson was hired as the Tigers' head softball coach on May 26, 2018. Anderson signed a five-year contract with Missouri after spending four years as the head coach at Hofstra.

In 2019, the Tigers received NCAA sanctions due to academic misconduct. This included a one-year postseason ban, scholarship and recruiting limitations, and a monetary fine. The sanctions were in effect for the 2020 season, which ended up being cancelled due to the COVID-19 pandemic. The NCAA later ruled that the postseason ban would not apply to the 2021 season.

== Head coaches ==
Name	Years	Won	Lost	Pct.
Alexis Jarrett	1975–1976	28	14	.667
Debbie Duran	1977–1980	78	50	.609
Barb Preist	1981–1982	91	32	.740
Joyce Compton	1983–1986	115	77	.599
Rhesa Sumrell	1987	14	18	.438
Jay Miller	1988–2002	556	309	.643
Ty Singleton	2003–2006	130	88	.596
Ehren Earleywine	2007–2018	226	104	.685
Gina Fogue (interim)	2018	30	29	.508
Larissa Anderson	2018–present	242	146	.623

== Year-by-year results ==
Season	Coach	Record		Notes
Season	Coach	Overall	Conference	Notes
Big 8 Conference
1975	Alexis Jarrett	14–7	—	AIAW State Championship (2nd Place)
1976	Alexis Jarrett	14–7	—	AIAW State Championship (2nd Place)
1977	Debbie Duren	19–11	—	AIAW State Championship (2nd Place)
1978	Debbie Duren	14–17	—	AIAW State Championship (4th Place)
1979	Debbie Duren	9–15	—	AIAW State Championship (4th Place)
1980	Debbie Duren	36–17	—	AIAW Region 6 Championship (5th Place)
1981	Barb Preist	46–20	—	AIAW Women's College World Series (5th Place)
1982	Barb Preist	46–20	—	NCAA Regional
1983	Joyce Compton	40–13	—	NCAA Women's College World Series (7th Place)
1984	Joyce Compton	21–18	—	
1985	Joyce Compton	29–23	—	
1986	Joyce Compton	25–23	—	
1987	Rhesa Sumrell	14–18	—	
1988	Jay Miller	44–18	—	
1989	Jay Miller	35–22	—	
1990	Jay Miller	30–14	—	No. 20 Final NCAA poll
1991	Jay Miller	39–14	—	Big 8 Champions, Big 8 Tournament Champions, Women's College World Series (5th Place)
1992	Jay Miller	41–14	—	No. 16 Final NCAA poll
1993	Jay Miller	31–18	—	
1994	Jay Miller	40–23	—	Women's College World Series (7th Place)
1995	Jay Miller	47–19	—	NCAA Regional, No. 23 Final NFCA poll
Big 12 Conference
1996	Jay Miller	31–22	11–10	
1997	Jay Miller	47–16	15–3	Big 12 Champions, Big 12 Tournament Champions, NCAA Regional, No. 12 Final NFCA poll
	Jay Miller	36–20	5–13	
1999	Jay Miller	41–21	10–5	NCAA Regional, No. 15 Final NFCA poll
2000	Jay Miller	34–27	6–13	
2001	Jay Miller	31–28	5–11	
2002	Jay Miller	29–33	4–14	
2003	Ty Singleton	31–20	12–5	NCAA Regional
2004	Ty Singleton	29–26	13–4	NCAA Regional
2005	Ty Singleton	44–15	10–8	NCAA Regional, No. 20 Final NFCA poll
2006	Ty Singleton	26–27	7–11	
2007	Ehren Earleywine	40–24	13–4	NCAA Regional, No. 19 Final USA Softball poll
2008	Ehren Earleywine	47–17	11–6	NCAA Super Regional
2009	Ehren Earleywine	50–12	12–6	Big 12 Tournament Champions, Women's College World Series (7th Place)
2010	Ehren Earleywine	51–13	11–7	Women's College World Series (7th Place)
2011	Ehren Earleywine	53–10	15–3	Big 12 Champions, Women's College World Series (6th Place)
2012	Ehren Earleywine	47–14	17–7	NCAA Super Regional
Southeastern Conference
2013	Ehren Earleywine	38–14	15–8	NCAA Super Regional
2014	Ehren Earleywine	43–18	15–9	NCAA Regional
2015	Ehren Earleywine	41–17	14–10	NCAA Super Regional
2016	Ehren Earleywine	42–16	14–10	NCAA Super Regional
2017	Ehren Earleywine	29–28	7–16	NCAA Regional
2018	Gina Fogue (interim)	30–29	6–17	NCAA Regional
2019	Larissa Anderson	35–25	12–12	NCAA Regional
2020	Larissa Anderson	19–7	3–0	Season cancelled due to COVID-19 pandemic
2021	Larissa Anderson	42–17	15–9	NCAA Super Regional
2022	Larissa Anderson	38–22	12–11	NCAA Regional
2023	Larissa Anderson	35–26	7–17	NCAA Regional
2024	Larissa Anderson	48-17	13-11	NCAA Super Regional
2025	Larissa Anderson	25-31	6-18	
2026	Larissa Anderson	28-29	9-15	

== Missouri in the NCAA Tournament ==
1982
Lincoln, NE Regional

Lost to Nebraska, 1–0
Defeated Nebraska, 1–0
Lost to Nebraska, 4–1

1983
Columbia, MO Regional

Lost to SW Missouri St 3–1
Defeated SW Missouri St 3–0
Defeated SW Missouri St 1–0

Women's College World Series
Lost to UCLA 1-0
Lost to Pacific 1-0

1991
Iowa City, IA Regional

Defeated Iowa 2–0
Defeated Iowa 4–0

Women's College World Series
Lost to Long Beach State 1–0
Defeated Pacific 2–0
Lost to UCLA 5–0

1994
Lawrence, KS Regional

Defeated Kansas 1–0
Lost to Hawaii 2–1
Defeated Kansas 1–0
Defeated Hawaii 3–1
Defeated Hawaii 2–1

Women's College World Series
Lost to Cal State Northridge 5–3
Lost to Oklahoma State 7–3

1995
Northridge, CA Regional

Lost to Cal State Northridge 2–1
Lost to Illinois State 5–1

1997
Iowa City, IA Regional

Lost to Utah 3–1
Lost to DePaul 1–0

1999
Los Angeles, CA Regional

Lost to Cal State Northridge 7–3
Defeated Alabama 1–0
Defeated Cal State Northridge 3–1
Defeated Minnesota 3–0
Lost to UCLA 12–5

2003
Ann Arbor, MI Regional

Lost to Notre Dame 4–3
Lost to Wright State 3–1

2004
Los Angeles, CA Regional

Lost to Louisville 1–0
Lost to Mississippi Valley State 4–3

2005
Columbia, MO Regional

Lost to Southern Illinois 3–0
Defeated Robert Morris 9–0
Defeated Southern Illinois 9–0
Lost to Stanford 3–2

2007
Carbondale, IL Regional

Defeated Southern Illinois 8–0
Lost to DePaul 2–0
Defeated Southern Illinois 7–4
Lost to DePaul 3–0

2008
Iowa City, IA Regional

Defeated Iowa 3–2
Defeated Long Beach State 5–3
Defeated Iowa 5–4

Tuscaloosa, AL Super Regional
Lost to Alabama 6–1
Lost to Alabama 7–1

2009
Columbia, MO Regional

Defeated Illinois 5–1
Defeated Bradley 2–1
Defeated DePaul 1–0

Los Angeles, CA Super Regional
Defeated UCLA 2–1
Lost to UCLA 5–2
Defeated UCLA 9–1

Women's College World Series
Lost to Arizona State 7–3
Lost to Georgia 5–2

2010
Columbia, MO Regional

Defeated Creighton 3–2
Defeated Illinois 3–1
Defeated Illinois 4–2

Columbia, MO Super Regional
Defeated Oregon 7–0
Defeated Oregon 7–2

Women's College World Series
Lost to Hawaii 3–2
Lost to Florida 5–0

2011
Columbia, MO Regional

Defeated Illinois State 12–3
Lost to DePaul 2–1
Defeated Illinois State 8–4
Defeated DePaul 7–3
Defeated DePaul 8–0

Columbia, MO Super Regional
Defeated Washington 4–0
Defeated Washington 6–3

Women's College World Series
Lost to Florida 6–2
Beat Oklahoma 4–1
Lost to Baylor 1–0

2012
Columbia, MO Regional

Defeated Illinois State 6–0
Defeated DePaul 1–0
Defeated Illinois State 2–1

Columbia, MO Super Regional
Lost to LSU 6–1
Defeated LSU 5–1
Lost to LSU 3–1

2013
Columbia, MO Regional

Defeated Stony Brook 3–0
Defeated Hofstra 1–0
Lost to Hofstra 10–0
Defeated Hofstra 5–0

Columbia, MO Super Regional
Lost to Washington 2–1
Lost to Washington 1–0

2014
Columbia, MO Regional

Defeated Bradley 6–5
Defeated Kansas 6–3
Lost to Nebraska 11–4
Lost to Nebraska 8–1

2015
Columbia, MO Regional

Defeated Indiana State 7–0
Defeated Kansas 5–3
Defeated Kansas 7–6

Los Angeles, CA Super Regional
Lost to UCLA 7–4
Lost to UCLA 10–6

2016
Columbia, MO Regional

Defeated BYU 9–0
Defeated Nebraska 8–0
Defeated Nebraska 9–0

Ann Arbor, MI Super Regional
Lost to Michigan 5–3
Lost to Michigan 5–4

2017
Eugene, OR Regional

Lost to Wisconsin 7–2
Lost to UIC 5–4

2018
Norman, OK Regional

Lost to Tulsa 9–1
Defeated Boston University 10–8
Defeated Tulsa 6–5
Lost to Oklahoma 7–0

2019
Los Angeles, CA Regional

Defeated Cal State Fullerton 7–4
Lost to UCLA 9–1
Defeated Weber State 7–0
Defeated UCLA 5–1
Lost to UCLA 13–1

2021
Columbia, MO Regional

Defeated UIC 0–8
Defeated Northern Iowa 4–0
Defeated Iowa State 5–0

Columbia, MO Super Regional
Lost to James Madison 2–1
Defeated James Madison 7–1
Lost to James Madison 7–2

2022
Columbia, MO Regional

Defeated Missouri State 3–1
Lost to Arizona 2–0
Defeated Missouri State 2–0
Lost to Arizona 1–0

2023
Norman, OK Regional

Defeated California 5–1
Lost to Oklahoma 11–0
Lost to California 7–5

2024
Columbia, MO Regional

Lost to Omaha 3–1
Defeated Indiana 5–1
Defeated Washington 4–1
Defeated Omaha 5—1
Defeated Omaha 1—0

Columbia, MO Super Regional
Lost to Duke 6–3
Defeated Duke 3–1
Lost to Duke 4-3

== Individual awards ==
Missouri has had numerous players earn national or conference honors including 31 NFCA All-Americans.

=== All Americans ===
- 1980

Lisa Burke

- 1983

Karen Sweet
Teresa Wilson

- 1986

Kris Schmidt

- 1990

Karen Snelgrove

- 1995

Karen Persinger

- 1997

Mary Babb
Barb Wright

- 1998

Wendy Harrison

- 1999

Kim Slover

* 2000

Stacy Gerneinhardt

- 2001

Erin Erickson
Melanie Fisher
Karen Williams

- 2003

Rachel McGinnis

- 2008

Rhea Taylor

- 2009

Marla Schweisberger
Rhea Taylor
Lindsey Ubrun

- 2011

Ashley Fleming
Rhea Taylor
Chelsea Thomas

- 2012

Ashley Fleming
Chelsea Thomas

- 2013

Chelsea Thomas

- 2014

Taylor Gadbois

- 2016

Emily Crane

- 2016

Sami Fagan

- 2020

Cayla Kessinger

- 2021

Brooke Wilmes

- 2023

Alex Honnold

=== All Women's College World Series ===
- 2010

Rhea Taylor

- 2011

Chelsea Thomas

=== National awards ===
NFCA Golden Shoe Award

- Taylor Gadbois – 2014

Rawlings Gold Glove

- Jenna Laird – 2022 SS
- Casidy Chaumont – 2022 OF

=== Conference awards ===
Big 12 Player of the Year

- Barb Wright – 1997

Big 12 Pitcher of the Year

- Chelsea Thomas – 2011, 2012

Big 12 Freshman of the Year

- Rhea Taylor – 2008

Big 12 Defensive Player of the Year

- Megan Christopher – 2011
- Corrin Genovese – 2012

Big 12 Coach of the Year

- Jay Miller – 1997
- Ty Singleton – 2003
- Ehren Earleywine – 2007, 2011

SEC Pitcher of the Year

- Chelsea Thomas – 2013

SEC Freshman of the Year

- Tori Finucane – 2014
- Jenna Laird – 2021

== See also ==
- List of NCAA Division I softball programs
