= Sharon J. Drysdale Field =

Stadium in Northridge, California, US

Coordinates: 42.066738°N 87.691220°W

Sharon J. Drysdale Field at Kirpatrick Stadium
- Interactive map of Sharon J. Drysdale Field at Kirpatrick Stadium
- Former names: Anderson Field (1979–2001); Sharon J. Drysdale Field (2002–2025)
- Location: Evansville, Illinois
- Owner: Northwestern University
- Capacity: 1,326

Construction
- Opened: 1979
- Renovated: 2006, 2025

Tenant
- Northwestern Wildcats softball (NCAA)

Sharon J. Drysdale Field at Kirkpatrick Stadium is the home field of the Northwestern Wildcats softball team of Northwestern University. The stadium is located in the athletic complex along Ashland Avenue, adjacent to Ryan Field, Welsh–Ryan Arena, and Rocky Miller Park. The venue has a seating capacity of 1,326.

Originally named Anderson Field, the stadium was renamed for longtime head coach Sharon Drysdale upon her retirement in 2001. The stadium saw significant renovations in 2006 and again in 2025. The latest project will see the facility named for lead donors Kip and Sara Kirkpatrick and is highlighted by expansions to permanent seating, a press box, and team facilities.
