= 2006 Tennessee Lady Volunteers softball team =

Iteration of sports team

2006 Tennessee Lady Volunteers softball

SEC Tournament Champions, W, 3–0 vs. LSU
- Conference: Southeastern Conference
- East
- Record: 61–12 (21–9 SEC)
- Head coach: Ralph Weekly; Karen Weekly
- Assistant coach: Marty McDaniel; Mark Weekly
- Home stadium: Tyson Park

The 2006 Tennessee Lady Volunteers softball team was an American softball team, representing the University of Tennessee for the 2005 NCAA softball season. The team played their home games at Tyson Park. The team made it to the 2006 Women's College World Series. The Lady Volunteers finished third for the 2nd straight year.

== Roster ==
2006 Tennessee Lady Volunteers roster
Pitchers: 7 Monica Abbott – Junior; 5 Danielle Pieroni – Freshman; 10 Megan Rhodes – Sophomore; Outfielders: 2 Alicia Brown – Freshman; 3 Sarah Fekete – Senior; 4 Sarah Vaughn – Freshman; 6 Katherine Card – Senior; 17 Lillian Hammond – Freshman; 23 India Chiles – Junior	Catchers: 35 Shannon Doepking – Sophomore; Infielders: 1 Liane Horiuchi – Freshman; 8 Kenora Posey – Sophomore; 9 Caitlin Ryan – Sophomore; 12 Allison Fulmer – Freshman; 22 Kortney Bell – Sophomore; 24 Kristi Durant – Senior; 25 Natalie Brock – Sophomore; 31 Jennifer Griffin – Freshman; 33 Lindsay Schutzler – Junior; 35 Tonya Callahan – Sophomore

== Schedule ==
Date	Time	Opponent	Rank^{#}	Site	Result	Attendance	Winning Pitcher	Losing Pitcher
February 10*	2:00 PM	Illinois St. Redbirds	#3	CCU Softball Stadium • Conway, SC	W 1–0^{(8)}	122	M. Abbott	S. Nicholson
February 10*	4:30 PM	Coastal Carolina Chanticleers	#3	CCU Softball Stadium • Conway, SC	W 10–4	134	M. Rhodes	D. Gerdts
February 11*	12:00 PM	Coastal Carolina Chanticleers	#3	CCU Softball Stadium • Conway, SC	W 8–0^{(5)}	67	M. Abbott	C. Doyle
February 11*	2:30 PM	Illinois St. Redbirds	#3	CCU Softball Stadium • Conway, SC	Canceled	–	–	–
Louisville Slugger Tournament
February 17*	9:00 PM	#18 Oregon Ducks	#4	SLC Field • Las Vegas, NV	W 1–0	184	M. Abbott	A. Harris
February 17*	11:15 PM	Cal Poly Mustangs	#4	SLC Field • Las Vegas, NV	W 10–0^{(6)}	112	M. Rhodes	J. Maiden
February 18*	6:45 PM	Purdue Boilermakers	#4	SLC Field • Las Vegas, NV	W 12–3^{(5)}	253	M. Rhodes	D. LaRiva
February 18*	10:30 PM	#8 Kansas Jayhawks	#4	SLC Field • Las Vegas, NV	W 13–1^{(5)}	174	M. Abbott	C. Humphreys
February 19*	6:45 PM	Hawaii Rainbow Wahine	#4	SLC Field • Las Vegas, NV	W 13–1	256	M. Abbott	J. Smethurst
NFCA Leadoff Tournament
February 24*	5:00 PM	#25 Iowa Hawkeyes	#2	Olympic Park • Columbus, GA	W 11–2^{(5)}	278	M. Abbott	A. Arnold
February 24*	7:30 PM	Florida St. Seminoles	#2	Olympic Park • Columbus, GA	W 1–0	278	M. Abbott	T. McDonald
Worth Tournament
March 3*	2:15 PM	#5 Stanford Cardinal	#3	Titan Softball Complex • Fullerton, CA	Canceled	–	–	–
March 3*	11:15 PM	UC Davis Aggies	#3	Titan Softball Complex • Fullerton, CA	W 7–0	549	M. Abbott	L. Tognetti
March 4*	2:15 PM	#16 Northwestern Wildcats	#3	Titan Softball Complex • Fullerton, CA	W 3–2	–	M. Abbott	C. Foster
March 4*	9 :00PM	Texas Tech Red Raiders	#3	Titan Softball Complex • Fullerton, CA	W 4–0	–	M. Rhodes	E. Crawford
USF Adidas Tournament
March 9*	11:00 AM	NC State Wolfpack	#2	Eddie Moore Field • Clearwater, FL	W 9–0	315	M. Abbott	S. Ervin
March 9*	4:00 PM	Buffalo Bulls	#2	Eddie Moore Field • Clearwater, FL	W 9–0^{(5)}	184	M. Rhodes	S. Barstad
March 10*	11:00 AM	Temple Owls	#2	Eddie Moore Field • Clearwater, FL	W 14–0^{(5)}	197	M. Rhodes	J. Nacianceno
March 10*	1:00 PM	UIC Flames	#2	Eddie Moore Field • Clearwater, FL	W 2–0	174	M. Abbott	B. McIntyre
March 11*	1:00 PM	Hofstra Pride	#2	Eddie Moore Field • Clearwater, FL	W 5–0	201	M. Rhodes	M. Hodge
March 11*	6:00 PM	USF Bulls	#2	Eddie Moore Field • Clearwater, FL	W 8–0 ^{(6)}	319	M. Abbott	B. Spence
March 12*	9:30 AM	Tennessee Tech Golden Eagles	#2	Eddie Moore Field • Clearwater, FL	W 8–0^{(6)}	245	M. Rhodes	A. Glover
March 12*	11:30 AM	UMass Minutemen	#2	Eddie Moore Field • Clearwater, FL	W 20–0^{(5)}	174	M. Abbott	J. Busa
March 14*	4:00 PM	Belmont Bruins	#2	Tyson Park • Knoxville, TN	W 8–0	487	M. Abbott	Batte
March 14*	6:30 PM	Belmont Bruins	#2	Tyson Park • Knoxville, TN	W 15–1^{(5)}	487	M. Rhodes	Bowser
March 18	1:00 PM	#18 Auburn Tigers	#2	Tyson Park • Knoxville, TN	W 2–0	896	M. Abbott	B. DiPietro
March 18	3:30 PM	#18 Auburn Tigers	#2	Tyson Park • Knoxville, TN	L 1–3	896	H. Currie	M. Rhodes
March 19	1:00 PM	#18 Auburn Tigers	#2	Tyson Park • Knoxville, TN	W 8–0^{(5)}	327	M. Abbott	H. Currie
March 23*	3:00 PM	Liberty Flames	#2	Tyson Park • Knoxville, TN	W 8–0^{(6)}	363	M. Abbott	S. Swor
March 23*	5:30 PM	Liberty Flames	#2	Tyson Park • Knoxville, TN	W 9–0^{(6)}	363	M. Rhodes	T. Lowe
March 25	2:00 PM	#6 Alabama Crimson Tide	#2	Rhodes Stadium • Tuscaloosa, AL	L 2–3	1,759	S. VanBrakle	M. Abbott
March 25	4:30 PM	#6 Alabama Crimson Tide	#2	Rhodes Stadium • Tuscaloosa, AL	L 4–5^{(9)}	1,759	C. Owens	M. Abbott
March 26	2:30 PM	#6 Alabama Crimson Tide	#2	Rhodes Stadium • Tuscaloosa, AL	L 3–6	1,243	S. VanBrakle	M. Abbott
March 29	3:00 PM	Kentucky Wildcats	#5	UK Softball Complex • Lexington, KY	W 8–0^{(5)}	174	M. Abbott	S. Allen
March 29	5:30 PM	Kentucky Wildcats	#5	UK Softball Complex • Lexington, KY	W 4–0	174	M. Abbott	J. Trueblood
March 30	1:00 PM	Kentucky Wildcats	#5	UK Softball Complex • Lexington, KY	W 8–0	132	M. Abbott	J. Trueblood
April 1	2:00 PM	Arkansas Razorbacks	#5	Lady Back Yard • Fayetteville, AR	W 5–0	1,023	M. Abbott	B. Perry
April 1	4:30 PM	Arkansas Razorbacks	#5	Lady Back Yard • Fayetteville, AR	W 8–1	1,023	M. Abbott	K. Henry
April 2	2:00 PM	Arkansas Razorbacks	#5	Lady Back Yard • Fayetteville, AR	W 6–0	322	M. Abbott	K. Henry
April 5*	5:00 PM	ETSU Buccaneers	#5	Tyson Park • Knoxville, TN	W 10–2^{(5)}	346	M. Rhodes	C. Jenkins
April 5*	7:30 PM	ETSU Buccaneers	#5	Tyson Park • Knoxville, TN	W 10–0^{(5)}	346	M. Abbott	M. Vercoe
April 8	5:00 PM	#24 Florida Gators	#5	Tyson Park • Knoxville, TN	L 4–6	523	S. Stevens	M. Abbott
April 9	11:00 AM	#24 Florida Gators	#5	Tyson Park • Knoxville, TN	L 0–2	788	S. Stevens	M. Abbott
April 9	1:30 PM	#24 Florida Gators	#5	Tyson Park • Knoxville, TN	W 8–0^{(6)}	788	M. Rhodes	S. Nelson
April 11*	4:00 PM	Austin Peay Governors	#5	Tyson Park • Knoxville, TN	W 2–0	378	M. Abbott	N. Anderson
April 11*	6:30 PM	Austin Peay Governors	#5	Tyson Park • Knoxville, TN	W 5–2	378	M. Abbott	E. Elrod
April 15	1:00 PM	Ole Miss Rebels	#6	Tyson Park • Knoxville, TN	W 4–0	769	M. Abbott	D. Brill
April 15	3:30 PM	Ole Miss Rebels	#6	Tyson Park • Knoxville, TN	W 9–3	769	M. Abbott	M. Callahan
April 16	1:00 PM	Ole Miss Rebels	#6	Tyson Park • Knoxville, TN	W 3–1	403	M. Abbott	D. Brill
April 18	5:00 PM	South Carolina Gamecocks	#6	Tyson Park • Knoxville, TN	W 7–0	369	M. Abbott	K. Pouliot
April 18	7:30 PM	South Carolina Gamecocks	#6	Tyson Park • Knoxville, TN	W 5–2	369	M. Abbott	C. Hamilton
April 19	4:00 PM	South Carolina Gamecocks	#6	Tyson Park • Knoxville, TN	W 3–0	269	M. Abbott	C. Hamilton
April 22	2:00 PM	Mississippi St. Bulldogs	#4	MSU Softball Field • Starkville, MS	W 2–1	308	M. Abbott	S. Hickerson
April 22	4:30 PM	Mississippi St. Bulldogs	#4	MSU Softball Field • Starkville, MS	W 3–1	308	M. Rhodes	R. Blake
April 23	2:00 PM	Mississippi St. Bulldogs	#4	MSU Softball Field • Starkville, MS	W 10–0^{(5)}	323	M. Abbott	S. Comeaux
April 26*	4:00 PM	Tennessee Tech Golden Eagles	#4	Tyson Park • Knoxville, TN	Canceled	–	–	-
April 29	1:00 PM	#9 Georgia Bulldogs	#4	Jack Turner Stadium • Athens, GA	L 3–5	1,521	K. Carroll	M. Abbott
April 29	3:30 PM	#9 Georgia Bulldogs	#4	Jack Turner Stadium • Athens, GA	W 12–0^{(5)}	1,521	M. Rhodes	K. Griffith
April 30	1:00 PM	#9 Georgia Bulldogs	#4	Jack Turner Stadium • Athens, GA	L 6–7	1,371	K. Griffith	M. Rhodes
May 6	12:00 PM	#11 LSU Tigers	#6	Tyson Park • Knoxville, TN	W 4–0	1,233	M. Abbott	E. Turner
May 6	2:30	#11 LSU Tigers	#6	Tyson Park • Knoxville, TN	W 10–1^{(5)}	1,233	M. Rhodes	D. Hofer
May 7	1:00 PM	#11 LSU Tigers	#6	Tyson Park • Knoxville, TN	L 0–4	657	E. Turner	M. Abbott
SEC Tournament
May 11	12:00 PM	Florida Gators	#5	Jack Turner Stadium • Athens, GA	W 6–0	-	M. Abbott	S. Stevens
May 12	1:00 PM	#4 Alabama Crimson Tide	#5	Jack Turner Stadium • Athens, GA	W 2–1	-	M. Rhodes	S. VanBrakle
May 13	1:00 PM	#11 LSU Tigers	#5	Jack Turner Stadium • Athens, GA	W 3–0	394	M. Abbott	E. Turner
NCAA Knoxville Regional
May 19	5:00 PM	Tennessee Tech Golden Eagles	#8	Tyson Park • Knoxville, TN	W 6–4	1,081	M. Rhodes	A. Bynum
May 20	1:30 PM	Virginia Tech Hokies	#8	Tyson Park • Knoxville, TN	W 9–1^{(5)}	-	M. Abbott	A. Tincher
May 21	12:00 PM	#18 Louisville Cardinals	#8	Tyson Park • Knoxville, TN	W 8–1	983	M. Abbott	C. Bishop
NCAA Knoxville Super Regional
May 27	12:00 PM	#9 Michigan Wolverines	#8	Tyson Park • Knoxville, TN	W 5–3	1,425	M. Abbott	J. Ritter
May 28	1:00 PM	#9 Michigan Wolverines	#8	Tyson Park • Knoxville, TN	L 1–5	1,283	J. Ritter	M. Abbott
May 28	3:30 PM	#9 Michigan Wolverines	#8	Tyson Park • Knoxville, TN	W 1–0	1,283	M. Abbott	J. Ritter
NCAA Women's College World Series
June 2	12:00 AM	#1 UCLA Bruins	#8	ASA Hall of Fame Stadium • Oklahoma City, OK	W 4–3	4,335	M. Abbott	A. Selden
June 2	9:00 PM	#4 Northwestern Wildcats	#8	ASA Hall of Fame Stadium • Oklahoma City, OK	L 0–2	5,877	E. Canney	M. Abbott
June 3	5:00 PM	#6 Arizona St. Sun Devils	#8	ASA Hall of Fame Stadium • Oklahoma City, OK	W 3–1^{(9)}	-	M. Abbott	K. Burkhart
June 4	1:00 PM	#2 Arizona Wildcats	#8	ASA Hall of Fame Stadium • Oklahoma City, OK	W 1–0	-	M. Abbott	A. Hollowell
June 4	7:00 PM	#2 Arizona Wildcats	#8	ASA Hall of Fame Stadium • Oklahoma City, OK	L 0–6	3,864	A. Hollowell	M. Abbott
*Non-Conference Game. ^{#}Rankings from NFCA released prior to game.All times are in Eastern Time Zone.

== Ranking movements ==
Ranking movements Legend: ██ Increase in ranking ██ Decrease in ranking
	Week														
Poll	Pre	1	2	3	4	5	6	7	8	9	10	11	12	13	Final
NFCA/USA Today	3	4	2	3	3	2	2	5	5	6	4	4	6	5	3
