= Ralph Weekly =

American softball coach

Biographical details
- Education: Arizona State; Pacific Lutheran

Coaching career (HC unless noted)

College Softball
- 1986–1994: Pacific Luthern
- 1995–1998: Chattanooga (Co-HC)
- 2001: Chattanooga (Co-HC)
- 2002–2021: Tennessee (Co-HC)

National Softball
- 1994–2001: USA Women's Softball (asst.)

Football
- 1986–1993: Pacific Luthern (asst.)

Administrative career (AD unless noted)
- 1998–2001: USA Softball National Team's (Director)

Head coaching record
- Overall: 1450–481–2 (.751)

Accomplishments and honors

Championships
- SEC Regular Season Champions (2007) 3× SEC Eastern Division Champions (2004, 2007, 2012); 2× SEC tournament Champions (2006, 2011); 4× SoCon Regular Season Champions (1995, 1997, 1998, 2001); 4× SoCon Tournament Champions (1996–1998, 2001) 2× NAIA National Champions (1988, 1992)

Awards
- National Fastpitch Coaches Association Hall of Fame (2011) 2× SEC Co-Coach of the Year (2004, 2007); 2× Speedline South Region Coaching Staff of the Year (2005, 2007); 3× NFCA Southeast Region Coaching Staff of the Year (2010, 2012, 2013); 2× UT Daily Beacon Lady Vol Coach of the Year (2001–02, 2002–03); 2× SoCon Coach of the Year (1998, 2001); 2× NAIA National Coach of the Year (1988, 1992) 8× NAIA West Region Coach of the Year (1986–1990, 1992–1994)

Records
- Tennessee first SEC team to reach WCWS Championship Series; Tennessee first SEC team to reach #1 in polls (2007)

Ralph Weekly is an American softball coach who with his wife Karen, was the co-head coach at Tennessee from 2002 until his retirement in 2021.

== Early life and education ==
Weekly graduated from Arizona State University in Tempe in 1973. He earned his master's degree in international relations from Pacific Lutheran University in Parkland, Washington. Weekly served in the United States Air Force and retired in 1986.

== Coaching career ==
=== Pacific Lutheran ===
Coached from 1986-1994

=== Chattanooga ===
Coached as a co-head coach from 1995-1998 and in 2001

=== Tennessee ===
On June 23, 2021, Ralph Weekly retired as co-head coach of Tennessee and his wife Karen signed an extension through 2025, on the same day.

== Head coaching record ==
=== College ===
Record table
Season	Team	Overall	Conference	Standing	Postseason
Pacific Lutheran (Northwest Conference) (1986–1994)
1986	Pacific Lutheran	25–6	4–2	T-2nd	
1987	Pacific Lutheran	29–11	14–2	1st	
1988	Pacific Lutheran	40–6	14–2	1st	NAIA National Championship
1989	Pacific Lutheran	33–13	13–3	1st	
1990	Pacific Lutheran	40–8	15–1	1st	NAIA National Runner-Up
1991	Pacific Lutheran	36–8	13–1	1st	
1992	Pacific Lutheran	34–13	10–1	1st	NAIA National Championship
1993	Pacific Lutheran	35–9	8–0	1st	NAIA Fifth-Place
1994	Pacific Lutheran	39–19	13–3	1st	
Pacific Lutheran:		310–93 (.769)	104–15 (.874)		
Chattanooga Mocs (Southern Conference) (1995–1998)
1995	Chattanooga	29–21	8–4	T-1st	
1996	Chattanooga	34–15	6–6	T-2nd	
1997	Chattanooga	32–19	5–3	1st	
1998	Chattanooga	47–15	10–2	1st	
Chattanooga Mocs (Southern Conference) (2001–present)
2001	Chattanooga	49–18	18–2	1st	NCAA Regionals
Chattanooga:		191–88 (.685)	47–17 (.734)		
Tennessee Volunteers (Southeastern Conference) (2002–Present)
2002	Tennessee	35–25–1	8–17	4th (East)	
2003	Tennessee	45–25	14–15	4th (East)	
2004	Tennessee	55–16	20–8	1st (East)	NCAA Regional
2005	Tennessee	67–15	20–8	2nd (East)	Women's College World Series
2006	Tennessee	61–12	21–9	2nd (East)	Women's College World Series
2007	Tennessee	63–8	23–4	1st (East)	Women's College World Series Runner-Up
2008	Tennessee	50–16	14–12	2nd (East)	NCAA Regional
2009	Tennessee	40–18–1	12–12–1	3rd (East)	NCAA Regional
2010	Tennessee	49–15	17–8	3rd (East)	Women's College World Series
2011	Tennessee	49–12	20–8	2nd (East)	NCAA Regional
2012	Tennessee	52–14	22–6	1st (East)	Women's College World Series
2013	Tennessee	52–12	16–6	2nd (East)	Women's College World Series Runner-Up
2014	Tennessee	46–12	17–7	2nd	NCAA Super Regional
2015	Tennessee	47–17	15–9	T-4th	Women's College World Series
2016	Tennessee	43–16	16–7	T-3rd	NCAA Regional
2017	Tennessee	48–12	16–7	T-3rd	NCAA Super Regional
2018	Tennessee	48–14	14–10	4th	NCAA Super Regional
2019	Tennessee	43–17	14–10	T-2nd	NCAA Super Regional
2020	Tennessee	14–9	0–0		Season canceled due to COVID-19
2021	Tennessee	42–15	12–11	7th	NCAA Regional
Tennessee:		949–300–2 (.759)	311–174–1 (.641)		
Total:		1450–481–2 (.751)			
National champion Postseason invitational champion Conference regular season champion Conference regular season and conference tournament champion Division regular season champion Division regular season and conference tournament champion Conference tournament champion
