= List of Tennessee Lady Volunteers head softball coaches =

The Tennessee Lady Volunteers softball program is a college softball team that represents the University of Tennessee in the Southeastern Conference. The Lady Vols compete in the National Collegiate Athletic Association (NCAA) Division I. The current head coach is Karen Weekly, who coached her first season jointly with her husband Ralph Weekly in 2002. Ralph retired in 2021, leaving Karen as the sole coach.

The first season of softball at Tennessee was in 1996. The team has had three recorded head coaches.

The Lady Vols have appeared in the Women's College World Series nine times, and twice finished as the runner-up.

== Key ==
General
#	Number of coaches (Note: A running total of the number of head coaches.)
GC	Games coached

Overall
OW	Wins
OL	Losses
OT	Ties
O%	Winning percentage

Conference (Note: The Lady Vols played their first season as an independent, and then each season after as a member of the SEC.)
CW	Wins
CL	Losses
CT	Ties
C%	Winning percentage

Postseason (Note: Postseason play involving the NCAA Division I softball championship.)
PA	Total appearances (Note: Postseason appearances include seasons with NCAA Division I softball championship bids.)
PW	Total wins
PL	Total losses
WA	Women's College World Series appearances (Note: Women's College World Series appearances include seasons with WCWS bids.)
WW	Women's College World Series wins
WL	Women's College World Series losses

Championships
DC	Division regular season (Note: The SEC used a divisional format from 1997–2013. The division winner with the highest record was named SEC regular season champion.)
CC	Conference regular season
CT	Conference tournament (Note: The SEC softball tournament began in 1997.)

== Coaches ==
List of head Softball coaches showing season(s) coached, overall records, conference records, postseason records, and championships. (Note: Statistics correct as of the end of the 2025 college softball season.)
#	Name	Term	GC	OW	OL	OT	O%	CW	CL	CT	C%	PA	PW	PL	WA	WW	WL	DCs	CCs	CTs	NCs
1	Jim Beitia	1996-2001	396	233	163	0	.588	64	75	0	.460	1	0	2	—	—	—	1	—	—	—
2	Ralph Weekly and Karen Weekly	2002-2021	1251	949	300	2	.759	501	174	1	.742	17	62	26	7	15	14	3	1	2	—
3	Karen Weekly (Note: Includes her records as sole head coach. Note that she also is credited with the results of her time as co-head coach from 2002 through 2021.)	2022-present	240	183	57	0	.763	68	27	0	.716	4	16	5	2	4	4	—	2	1	—
