= 2007 NCAA Division I softball rankings =

Wikimedia list article

2007 NCAA Division I softball season
- Defending Champions: Arizona

Tournament

Women's College World Series
- Champions: Arizona (8th title)
- Runners-up: Tennessee (3rd WCWS Appearance)
- Winning Coach: Mike Candrea (8th title)
- WCWS MOP: Taryne Mowatt (Arizona)

Seasons
- ← 2006 2008 →

The following human polls make up the 2007 NCAA Division I women's softball rankings. The NFCA/USA Today Poll is voted on by a panel of 30 Division I softball coaches and ranks to top 25 teams nationally.

== Legend ==
	Increase in ranking
	Decrease in ranking
	Not ranked previous week
Italics	Number of first place votes
(#–#)	Win-loss record
т	Tied with team above or below also with this symbol

== NFCA/USA Today ==
	Week 0 Jan 24	Week 1 Feb 14	Week 2 Feb 21	Week 3 Feb 28	Week 4 Mar 7	Week 5 Mar 14	Week 6 Mar 21	Week 7 Mar 28	Week 8 Apr 4	Week 9 Apr 11	Week 10 Apr 18	Week 11 Apr 25	Week 12 May 2	Week 13 May 9	Week Final June 20	
1.	Arizona (23)	Tennessee (26)	Tennessee (28)	Tennessee (30)	Tennessee (30)	Tennessee (27)	Tennessee (29)	Tennessee (24)	Tennessee (26)	Tennessee (25)	Tennessee (24)	Tennessee (24)	Alabama (20)	Tennessee (23)	Arizona (24)	1.
2.	Tennessee (7)	Arizona State	Arizona State (2)	Arizona State	Arizona	Arizona State (2)	Alabama (1)	Texas A&M	Alabama	Alabama	Alabama (1)	Alabama (1)	Tennessee (5)	Alabama (1)	Tennessee	2.
3.	UCLA	Arizona (1)	Texas A&M	Arizona	Arizona State	Texas A&M	Texas A&M	Alabama	Oklahoma	Oklahoma	Arizona	Oklahoma	Oklahoma	Oklahoma	Washington	3.
4.	Northwestern	Texas A&M (1)	Arizona	Texas A&M	Alabama	Alabama (1)	Oklahoma	Oklahoma	Texas A&M	Arizona (1)	Oklahoma	Arizona	LSU (1)	Arizona (1)	Northwestern	4.
5.	Arizona State	Alabama	Alabama	Alabama	Texas A&M	Arizona	Arizona State	Arizona	Arizona	Texas A&M	Texas A&M	Texas A&M	Arizona	LSU	Baylor	5.
6.	Oregon State	Northwestern	Oregon State	Oklahoma	Oklahoma	Oklahoma	Arizona	LSU	LSU	LSU	LSU	LSU	Texas A&M	Northwestern	DePaul	6.
7.	Alabama	Oregon State	Northwestern	LSU	Northwestern	Northwestern	Northwestern	Arizona State	Arizona State	Northwestern	Arizona State	Arizona State	Northwestern	Texas A&M	Texas A&M	7.
8.	Stanford	LSU	LSU	Northwestern	Texas	Texas	LSU	Northwestern	Northwestern	Arizona State	Northwestern	Northwestern	Michigan	Baylor	Arizona State	8.
9.	LSU	UCLA	Oklahoma	Stanford	Michigan	Michigan	Michigan	Texas	Michigan	Michigan	Michigan	Michigan	Arizona State	Arizona State	Alabama	9.
10.	California	Texas (2)	Texas	Texas	LSU	LSU	Texas	Michigan	Oregon	Oregon	Baylor	Baylor	Baylor	Michigan	LSU	10.
11.	Michigan	California	Stanford	Oregon State	Washington	UCLA	UCLA	UCLA	Texas	Texas	Washington	Washington	Washington	Washington	Oklahoma	11.
12.	Washington	Oklahoma	UCLA	UCLA	UCLA	Washington	Washington	Washington	UCLA	Washington	UCLA	UCA	UCLA	Hawaii	Hawaii	12.
13.	Texas A&M	Stanford	Michigan	Michigan	Stanford	Stanford	Stanford	Oregon	Washington	Baylor	Oregon State	Oregon State	Hawaii	UCLA	Michigan	13.
14.	Georgia	Michigan	Louisiana–Lafayette	Louisiana–Lafayette	Oregon State	Baylor	Oregon	Stanford	Stanford	UCLA	Oregon	Hawaii	DePaul	DePaul	Florida	14.
15.	Nebraska	Washington	Washington	Washington	Louisiana–Lafayette	Oregon State	Louisiana–Lafayette	Louisiana–Lafayette	Louisiana–Lafayette	Hawaii	Texas	DePaul	Oregon State	Oregon State	Oregon State	15.
16.	Oklahoma	Louisiana–Lafayette	California	Baylor	Baylor	Oregon	Oregon State	Baylor	Baylor	Oregon State	Hawaii	Oregon	Stanford	Stanford	Cal State Fullerton	16.
17.	Texas	Baylor	Baylor	Florida	Oregon	Louisiana–Lafayette	Baylor	Oregon State	Oregon State	Stanford	DePaul	Stanford	Texas	Georgia Tech	Virginia Tech	17.
18.	Baylor	Georgia	Georgia	California	Southern Illinois	Georgia	Georgia	Southern Illinois	Hawaii	DePaul	Stanford	Texas	Oregon	Texas	UCLA	18.
19.	Louisiana–Lafayette	Nebraska	Florida	Florida State	Florida	Florida	Southern Illinois	Florida	DePaul	Louisiana–Lafayette	Illinois State	Southern Illinois	Georgia Tech	Florida	Georgia Tech	19.
20.	Louisville	Florida	Florida State	Southern Illinois	Georgia Tech	Southern Illinois	Illinois State	Illinois State	Southern Illinois	Southern Illinois	Southern Illinois	Florida	Florida	Oregon	Stanford	20.
21.	Fresno State	Fresno State	Nebraska	Georgia	Georgia	Illinois State	Hawaii	Hawaii	Illinois State	Illinois State	Louisiana–Lafayette	Georgia Tech	Southern Illinois	Virginia Tech	South Carolina	21.
22.	South Florida	Florida State	Fresno State	Oregon	Illinois State	Georgia Tech	Florida	Georgia	North Carolina	Florida	Florida	Louisiana–Lafayette	Louisiana–Lafayette	Illinois State	Oregon	22.
23.	UMass	UMass	NC State	Nebraska	California	Hawaii	NC State	DePaul	Florida	North Carolina	Virginia Tech	Virginia Tech	Illinois State	Louisiana–Lafayette	Ohio State	23.
24.	Auburn	South Florida	Southern Illinois	Georgia Tech	NC State	Florida State	DePaul	NC State	Fresno State	Fresno State	Georgia Tech	Illinois State	Virginia Tech	Southern Illinois	Texas	24.
25.	Florida State	DePaul	UMass	Hawaii	Florida State	California	California	North Carolina	Georgia Tech	Georgia Tech	Fresno State	NC State	Missouri	NC State	Fresno State	25.
	Week 0 Jan 24	Week 1 Feb 14	Week 2 Feb 21	Week 3 Feb 28	Week 4 Mar 7	Week 5 Mar 14	Week 6 Mar 21	Week 7 Mar 28	Week 8 Apr 4	Week 9 Apr 11	Week 10 Apr 18	Week 11 Apr 25	Week 12 May 2	Week 13 May 9	Week Final June 20	
		Dropped: 20. Louisville; 24. Auburn	Dropped: 24. South Florida; 25. DePaul	Dropped: 22. Fresno State; 23. NC State; 25. UMass	Dropped: 23. Nebraska; 25. Hawaii	Dropped: 24. NC State	Dropped: 22. Georgia Tech; 24. Florida State	Dropped: 25. California	Dropped: 22. Georgia; 24. NC State	None	Dropped: 23. North Carolina	Dropped: 25. Fresno State	Dropped: 25. NC State	Dropped: 25. Missouri	Dropped: 22. Illinois State; 23. Louisiana–Lafayette; 24. Southern Illinois; 25. NC State	
