= 2007 Arizona Wildcats softball team =

American college softball season

2007 Arizona Wildcats softball

National Champion NCAA Tucson Super Regional champion NCAA Tucson Regional champion Pacific-10 champion
- Conference: Pacific-10 Conference
- Record: 50–14–1 (15–5–1 Pac-10)
- Head coach: Mike Candrea (22nd season)
- Home stadium: Rita Hillenbrand Memorial Stadium

2007 Pacific-10 Conference softball standings
	Conf.						Overall
Team	W		L		T	PCT	W		L		T	PCT
Arizona ‍†‍‍^{y}	15	–	5	–	1	.738	50	–	14	–	1	.777
Arizona State ‍‍‍^{y}	13	–	8	–	0	.619	54	–	17	–	0	.761
Washington ‍‍‍^{y}	12	–	9	–	0	.571	42	–	19	–	0	.689
UCLA ‍‍‍^{y}	12	–	9	–	0	.571	37	–	18	–	0	.673
Oregon State ‍‍‍^{y}	10	–	11	–	0	.476	41	–	23	–	0	.641
Stanford ‍‍‍^{y}	7	–	13	–	1	.357	35	–	21	–	1	.623
Oregon ‍‍‍^{y}	7	–	14	–	0	.333	44	–	19	–	0	.698
California ‍‍‍^{y}	7	–	14	–	0	.333	34	–	32	–	0	.515
† – Conference champion y – Invited to the NCAA tournament As of August 5, 2007; Rankings from Coaches' Poll

The 2007 Arizona Wildcats softball team represented the University of Arizona in the 2007 NCAA Division I softball season. The Wildcats were coached by Mike Candrea, who led his twenty-second season. The Wildcats finished with a record of 50–14–1. They played their home games at Rita Hillenbrand Memorial Stadium and competed in the Pacific-10 Conference, where they finished first with a 15–5–1 record.

The Wildcats were invited to the 2007 NCAA Division I softball tournament, where they swept the Regional and Super Regional and then completed a run through the Women's College World Series to claim their eighth (and, to date, their most recent) NCAA Women's College World Series Championship.

== Roster ==
2007 Arizona Wildcats roster
Pitchers: 8 – Amanda Williams – freshman; 9 - Taryne Mowatt – junior; 17 – Samantha Hoffman – freshman; Catchers: 15 - Callista Balko – junior; 21 – Stacie Chambers – freshman	Infielders: 3 – Sarah Akamine – freshman; 7 – K’Lee Arredondo – freshman; 12 – Danielle Rodriguez – junior; 14 – Chelsie Mesa – senior; 23 – Lauren Erb – freshman; 24 – Laine Roth – sophomore; 29 - Kristie Fox – senior; 31 - Jenae Leles – sophomore; 33 – Sam Banister – sophomore	Outfielders: 2 – Cyndi Duran – junior; 4 – Adrienne Acton – junior; 6 – Jill Malina – sophomore; 22 – Lisa Odom – freshman; 26 - Caitlin Lowe – senior

== Schedule ==
Legend
	Arizona win
	Arizona loss
	Tie
*	Non-Conference game

2007 Arizona Wildcats softball game log
Regular season

February
Date	Opponent	Rank	Site/stadium	Score	Overall record	Pac-10 record
Feb 9	vs Ohio State*	No. 1	Alberta B. Farrington Softball Stadium • Tempe, AZ	W 12–3^{5}	1–0	
Feb 9	vs Nevada*	No. 1	Alberta B. Farrington Softball Stadium • Tempe, AZ	W 6–2	2–0	
Feb 10	vs Florida*	No. 1	Alberta B. Farrington Softball Stadium • Tempe, AZ	L 1–3^{8}	2–1	
Feb 10	vs No. 4 Northwestern*	No. 1	Alberta B. Farrington Softball Stadium • Tempe, AZ	W 4–3	3–1	
Feb 11	vs Wisconsin*	No. 1	Alberta B. Farrington Softball Stadium • Tempe, AZ	W 4–1	4–1	
Feb 11	vs No. 13 Texas A&M*	No. 1	Alberta B. Farrington Softball Stadium • Tempe, AZ	L 2–3	4–2	
Feb 16	Temple*	No. 3	Rita Hillenbrand Memorial Stadium • Tucson, AZ	W 9–1^{5}	5–2	
Feb 16	Texas Tech*	No. 3	Rita Hillenbrand Memorial Stadium • Tucson, AZ	W 1–0	6–2	
Feb 17	Virginia*	No. 3	Rita Hillenbrand Memorial Stadium • Tucson, AZ	W 12–3^{6}	7–2	
Feb 17	Middle Tennessee*	No. 3	Rita Hillenbrand Memorial Stadium • Tucson, AZ	W 7–3	8–2	
Feb 18	Texas Tech*	No. 3	Rita Hillenbrand Memorial Stadium • Tucson, AZ	W 8–1	9–2	
Feb 23	No. 2 Texas A&M	No. 4	Rita Hillenbrand Memorial Stadium • Tucson, AZ	W 5–0	10–2	
Feb 24	No. 2 Texas A&M	No. 4	Rita Hillenbrand Memorial Stadium • Tucson, AZ	L 3–4	10–3	
Feb 25	No. 2 Texas A&M	No. 4	Rita Hillenbrand Memorial Stadium • Tucson, AZ	W 6–2	11–3	

March
Date	Opponent	Rank	Site/stadium	Score	Overall record	Pac-10 record
Mar 2	Missouri*	No. 3	Rita Hillenbrand Memorial Stadium • Tucson, AZ	W 5–4	12–3	
Mar 3	Missouri*	No. 3	Rita Hillenbrand Memorial Stadium • Tucson, AZ	W 8–1	13–3	
Mar 4	Missouri*	No. 3	Rita Hillenbrand Memorial Stadium • Tucson, AZ	W 8–7	14–3	
Mar 6	Creighton*	No. 3	Rita Hillenbrand Memorial Stadium • Tucson, AZ	W 6–2	15–3	
Mar 6	Creighton*	No. 3	Rita Hillenbrand Memorial Stadium • Tucson, AZ	W 7–3	16–3	
Mar 9	at No. 14 Baylor*	No. 2	Getterman Stadium • Waco, TX	W 3–0	17–3	
Mar 10	at No. 14 Baylor*	No. 2	Getterman Stadium • Waco, TX	L 2–3	17–4	
Mar 11	at No. 14 Baylor*	No. 2	Getterman Stadium • Waco, TX	L 2–3	17–5	
Mar 15	vs NC State*	No. 5	Anderson Family Field • Fullerton, CA	W 2–0	18–5	
Mar 15	vs No. 6 Oklahoma*	No. 5	Anderson Family Field • Fullerton, CA	L 2–6	18–6	
Mar 16	vs Pacific*	No. 5	Anderson Family Field • Fullerton, CA	W 11–0	19–6	
Mar 17	vs No. 7 Michigan*	No. 5	Anderson Family Field • Fullerton, CA	W 2–1	20–6	
Mar 18	vs No. 16 Louisiana–Lafayette*	No. 5	Anderson Family Field • Fullerton, CA	W 9–0	21–6	
Mar 18	vs No. 6 Oklahoma*	No. 5	Anderson Family Field • Fullerton, CA	L 0–11^{5}	21–7	
Mar 24	New Mexico*	No. 6	Rita Hillenbrand Memorial Stadium • Tucson, AZ	W 13–0^{5}	22–7	
Mar 24	New Mexico*	No. 6	Rita Hillenbrand Memorial Stadium • Tucson, AZ	W 8–0^{5}	23–7	
Mar 25	New Mexico*	No. 6	Rita Hillenbrand Memorial Stadium • Tucson, AZ	W 11–3^{6}	24–7	
Mar 30	at No. 16 Washington	No. 5	Husky Softball Stadium • Seattle, WA	W 6–0	25–7	1–0
Mar 31	at No. 14 UCLA	No. 5	Easton Stadium • Los Angeles, CA	L 0–2	25–8	1–1

April
Date	Opponent	Rank	Site/stadium	Score	Overall record	Pac-10 record
Apr 1	at No. 14 UCLA	No. 5	Easton Stadium • Los Angeles, CA	W 11–2	26–8	2–1
Apr 6	No. 9 Arizona State	No. 5	Rita Hillenbrand Memorial Stadium • Tucson, AZ	W 1–0	27–8	3–1
Apr 7	No. 9 Arizona State	No. 5	Rita Hillenbrand Memorial Stadium • Tucson, AZ	W 1–0	28–8	4–1
Apr 13	No. 12 Stanford	No. 4	Rita Hillenbrand Memorial Stadium • Tucson, AZ	W 4–1	29–8	5–1
Apr 14	California	No. 4	Rita Hillenbrand Memorial Stadium • Tucson, AZ	W 6–4	30–8	6–1
Apr 15	California	No. 4	Rita Hillenbrand Memorial Stadium • Tucson, AZ	W 5–2	31–8	7–1
Apr 18	at No. 9 Arizona State	No. 3	Alberta B. Farrington Softball Stadium • Tempe, AZ	L 3–6	31–9	7–2
Apr 20	No. 14 Oregon State	No. 3	Rita Hillenbrand Memorial Stadium • Tucson, AZ	W 3–1	32–9	8–2
Apr 21	No. 15 Oregon	No. 3	Rita Hillenbrand Memorial Stadium • Tucson, AZ	W 4–1	33–9	9–2
Apr 22	No. 15 Oregon	No. 3	Rita Hillenbrand Memorial Stadium • Tucson, AZ	W 9–1^{6}	34–9	10–2
Apr 27	at California	No. 4	Levine-Fricke Field • Berkeley, CA	W 6–0	35–9	11–2
Apr 28	at No. 17 Stanford	No. 4	Boyd & Jill Smith Family Stadium • Stanford, CA	L 2–3	35–10	11–3
Apr 29	at No. 17 Stanford	No. 4	Boyd & Jill Smith Family Stadium • Stanford, CA	T 0–0^{12}	35–10–1	11–3–1

May
Date	Opponent	Rank	Site/stadium	Score	Overall record	Pac-10 record
May 4	at No. 20 Oregon	No. 5	Howe Field • Eugene, OR	W 6–2	36–10–1	12–3–1
May 5	at No. 16 Oregon State	No. 5	Oregon State Softball Complex • Corvallis, OR	W 10–1^{5}	37–10–1	13–3–1
May 6	at No. 16 Oregon State	No. 5	Oregon State Softball Complex • Corvallis, OR	W 2–0	38–10–1	14–3–1
May 10	No. 14 UCLA	No. 4	Rita Hillenbrand Memorial Stadium • Tucson, AZ	L 4–7	38–11–1	14–4–1
May 11	No. 11 Washington	No. 4	Rita Hillenbrand Memorial Stadium • Tucson, AZ	L 1–5	38–12–1	14–5–1
May 12	No. 11 Washington	No. 4	Rita Hillenbrand Memorial Stadium • Tucson, AZ	W 5–4^{8}	39–12–1	15–5–1

Postseason

NCAA Tucson Regional
Date	Opponent	Rank	Site/stadium	Score	Overall record	NCAAT record
May 18	Howard	No. 4	Rita Hillenbrand Memorial Stadium • Tucson, AZ	W 9–0	40–12–1	1–0
May 19	Mississippi State	No. 4	Rita Hillenbrand Memorial Stadium • Tucson, AZ	W 8–0	41–12–1	2–0
May 20	Pacific	No. 4	Rita Hillenbrand Memorial Stadium • Tucson, AZ	W 7–0	42–12–1	3–0

NCAA Tucson Super Regional
Date	Opponent	Rank	Site/stadium	Score	Overall record	SR Record
May 26	Cal State Fullerton	No. 4	Rita Hillenbrand Memorial Stadium • Tucson, AZ	W 11–6	43–12–1	1–0
May 27	Cal State Fullerton	No. 4	Rita Hillenbrand Memorial Stadium • Tucson, AZ	W 2–1	44–12–1	2–0

NCAA Women's College World Series
Date	Opponent	Rank	Site/stadium	Score	Overall record	WCWS Record
May 31	No. 8 (8) Baylor	No. 4	ASA Hall of Fame Stadium • Oklahoma City, OK	W 2–1^{9}	45–12–1	1–0
June 1	No. 1 (5) Tennessee	No. 4	ASA Hall of Fame Stadium • Oklahoma City, OK	L 0–1	45–13–1	1–1
June 2	No. 14 (14) DePaul	No. 4	ASA Hall of Fame Stadium • Oklahoma City, OK	W 3–0	46–13–1	2–1
June 3	No. 11 (6) Washington	No. 4	ASA Hall of Fame Stadium • Oklahoma City, OK	W 2–0	47–13–1	3–1
June 3	No. 11 (6) Washington	No. 4	ASA Hall of Fame Stadium • Oklahoma City, OK	W 8–1	48–13–1	4–1
June 4	No. 1 (5) Tennessee	No. 4	ASA Hall of Fame Stadium • Oklahoma City, OK	L 0–3	48–14–1	4–2
June 5	No. 1 (5) Tennessee	No. 4	ASA Hall of Fame Stadium • Oklahoma City, OK	W 1–0	49–14–1	5–2
June 6	No. 1 (5) Tennessee	No. 4	ASA Hall of Fame Stadium • Oklahoma City, OK	W 5–0	50–14–1	6–2

== Ranking movements ==
Ranking movements Legend: ██ Increase in ranking ██ Decrease in ranking
	Week														
Poll	Pre	1	2	3	4	5	6	7	8	9	10	11	12	13	Final
NFCA/USA Today	1	3	4	3	2	5	6	5	5	4	3	4	5	4	1
