= Karen Weekly =

American softball coach

Current position
- Title: Head coach
- Team: Tennessee
- Conference: SEC
- Record: 1,181–369–3 (.761)

Biographical details
- Education: Washington; Pacific Lutheran

Coaching career (HC unless noted)
- 1987–1994: Pacific Luthern (asst.)
- 1995–1996: Chattanooga (asst.)
- 1997–1998: Chattanooga (Co-HC)
- 1999–2000: Chattanooga (Interim HC)
- 2001: Chattanooga (Co-HC)
- 2002–2021: Tennessee (Co-HC)
- 2022–present: Tennessee

Head coaching record
- Overall: 1,404–466–3 (.750)

Accomplishments and honors

Championships
- 3× SEC Regular Season (2007, 2023, 2024); 3× SEC Eastern Division (2004, 2007, 2012); 3× SEC tournament (2006, 2011, 2023); 5× SoCon Regular Season (1997–2001); 4× SoCon Tournament (1997, 1998, 2000, 2001)

Awards
- National Fastpitch Coaches Association Hall of Fame (2018); 4× SEC Coach of the Year (2004, 2007, 2023, 2024); 2× Speedline South Region Coaching Staff of the Year (2005, 2007); 3× NFCA Southeast Region Coaching Staff of the Year (2010, 2012, 2013); 2× UT Daily Beacon Lady Vol Coach of the Year (2001–02, 2002–03); 2× SoCon Coach of the Year (1999, 2001)

Records
- Tennessee first SEC team to reach WCWS Championship Series; Tennessee first SEC team to reach #1 in polls (2007)

Karen Weekly is an American softball coach who is the head coach at Tennessee. She was the co-head softball coach at Chattanooga from 1997–2001. She served as an assistant at both Chattanooga (1995–1996) and Pacific Lutheran (1987–1994). Weekly served as co-head coach at Tennessee along with her husband, Ralph Weekly, from 2002 through 2021 before her husband’s retirement.

== Early life and education ==
Weekly attended college at Pacific Lutheran University in Parkland, Washington, where she played softball from 1985 to 1987. She earned her juris doctor degree from the University of Washington School of Law in Seattle in 1990.

== Coaching career ==
=== Pacific Lutheran (assistant) ===
Assistant from 1987-1994

=== Chattanooga ===
Assistant from 1995-1996

Co-head softball coach from 1997-2001

=== Tennessee ===
On June 23, 2021, Karen Weekly signed an extension with Tennessee and her husband Ralph retired on the same day. She signed another extension with Tennessee on June 16, 2023, her contract runs through 2028.

== Head coaching record ==
=== College ===
Record table
Season	Team	Overall	Conference	Standing	Postseason
Chattanooga Mocs (Southern Conference) (1997–2001)
1997	Chattanooga	32–19	5–3	1st	
1998	Chattanooga	47–15	10–2	1st	
1999	Chattanooga	48–18*	16–0	1st	
2000	Chattanooga	47–27*	15–5	1st	NCAA Regional
2001	Chattanooga	49–18	18–2	1st	NCAA Regional
Chattanooga:		223–97 (.697)	64–12 (.842)		
Tennessee Volunteers (Southeastern Conference) (2002–Present)
2002	Tennessee	35–25–1	8–17	4th (East)	
2003	Tennessee	45–25	14–15	4th (East)	
2004	Tennessee	55–16	20–8	1st (East)	NCAA Regional
2005	Tennessee	67–15	20–8	2nd (East)	Women's College World Series
2006	Tennessee	61–12	21–9	2nd (East)	Women's College World Series
2007	Tennessee	63–8	23–4	1st (East)	Women's College World Series Runner-Up
2008	Tennessee	50–16	14–12	2nd (East)	NCAA Regional
2009	Tennessee	40–18–1	12–12–1	3rd (East)	NCAA Regional
2010	Tennessee	49–15	17–8	3rd (East)	Women's College World Series
2011	Tennessee	49–12	20–8	2nd (East)	NCAA Regional
2012	Tennessee	52–14	22–6	1st (East)	Women's College World Series
2013	Tennessee	52–12	16–6	2nd (East)	Women's College World Series Runner-Up
2014	Tennessee	46–12	17–7	2nd	NCAA Super Regional
2015	Tennessee	47–17	15–9	T-4th	Women's College World Series
2016	Tennessee	43–16	16–7	T-3rd	NCAA Regional
2017	Tennessee	48–12	16–7	T-3rd	NCAA Super Regional
2018	Tennessee	48–14	14–10	4th	NCAA Super Regional
2019	Tennessee	43–17	14–10	T-2nd	NCAA Super Regional
2020	Tennessee	14–9	0–0		Season canceled due to COVID-19
2021	Tennessee	42–15	12–11	7th	NCAA Regional
2022	Tennessee	41–18	15–8	3rd	NCAA Regional
2023	Tennessee	51–10	19–5	1st	Women’s College World Series
2024	Tennessee	44–12	19–5	1st	NCAA Super Regional
2025	Tennessee	47–17–1	15–9	4th	Women's College World Series
2026	Tennessee	49–12	16–8	T-4th	Women's College World Series
Tennessee:		1,181–369–2 (.762)	384–203–1 (.654)		
Total:		1,404–466–3 (.750)			
National champion Postseason invitational champion Conference regular season champion Conference regular season and conference tournament champion Division regular season champion Division regular season and conference tournament champion Conference tournament champion

* – Karen Weekly was served as interim head coach at Chattanooga instead of Co-HC during Ralph Weekly's Leave of Absence.
