= 1982 AIAW Women's College World Series =

The 1982 AIAW Women's College World Series was held from May 20 through May 25 in Norman, Oklahoma. The final two games were postponed by rain for two days. Twelve Division I college softball teams met in what was to become the last AIAW softball tournament of that organization's history. After playing their way through the regular season and regional tournaments (and for Oklahoma State, a conference tournament), the 12 advancing teams met for the AIAW Division I college softball championship. Days later, Oklahoma State went on to participate also in the NCAA WCWS tournament in Omaha. In 1982, the Division I softball tournaments of both the AIAW and the NCAA were called "Women's College World Series." That moniker has been used for the annual topmost-level collegiate women's softball tournaments since the first one in 1969. Historian Bill Plummer III wrote, "With their 77-8 season record, Texas A&M could have been a contender in Omaha − maybe even the top seed − against perennial softball powers like UCLA and Fresno State. The Aggies had been invited to the NCAA's first national tournament, but chose not to go. A&M coach Bob Brock had high respect for the eleven-year-old AIAW, even as the NCAA began to overshadow it. Out of a sense of loyalty to the AIAW, Brock said, his school chose the 1982 Norman championship over the NCAA's first in Omaha."

== Teams ==
The double-elimination tournament included these teams:

- California
- Central Michigan
- Michigan
- Ohio State
- Oklahoma
- Oklahoma State
- Univ. of Rhode Island
- Southwest Missouri State
- Texas A&M
- U.S. International Univ.
- Utah
- Western Illinois

Texas A&M, Utah, Michigan and California were the top four seeds. Top-seeded Texas A&M lost its opener in an 8-inning perfect game by USIU pitcher Jenny Stallard. But the Aggies battled back through the losers' bracket to claim the title by defeating Oklahoma State, who was unbeaten in the tournament to that point, twice in the championship final. In the deciding "if-necessary" game, the Aggies went to bat in the last regulation inning trailing the Cowgirls by one run. A double and an outfield error scored the tying run for A&M, who went on to score twice in the extra inning for the 5-3 victory. Texas A&M compiled a record of 7-1 in the tournament to become the first Texas A&M women's varsity team to win a national championship.

== Bracket ==
Upper round 1	Upper round 2	Upper round 3	Upper final	Final
Texas A&M	0
Ohio State	0	US International	1*^{8}
US International	1
US International	1
Michigan	2
Michigan	4
Oklahoma	0	Rhode Island	1
Michigan	1
Rhode Island	2
Oklahoma State	2
California	5
Southwest Missouri State	0	Central Michigan	0
California	0
Central Michigan	7
Oklahoma State	3
Utah	0
Western Illinois	0	Oklahoma State	2
Oklahoma State	7	Oklahoma State	1	3
Texas A&M	4	5^{8}
Lower round 1	Lower round 2	Lower round 3	Lower round 4	Lower final
Southwest Missouri State	0
Texas A&M	5
Texas A&M	2
Texas A&M	1	California	0
Western Illinois	0	Texas A&M	5
Western Illinois	2
Texas A&M	2	Michigan	0
Rhode Island	1
Central Michigan	0
Ohio State	0
Central Michigan	1^{10}
Central Michigan	1^{15}
Central Michigan	3^{8}	US International	0
Oklahoma	1
Oklahoma	4
Utah	2

* perfect game

== Ranking ==
Place	School	WCWS Record
1st	Texas A&M	7-1
2nd	Oklahoma State	4-2
3rd	Michigan	2-2
4th	Central Michigan	4-2
5th	United States International Univ.	2-2
5th	California	1-2
7th	Oklahoma	1-2
7th	Univ. of Rhode Island	1-2
7th	Western Illinois	1-2
10th	Ohio State	0-2
10th	Southwest Missouri State	0-2
10th	Utah	0-2

== See also ==
- 1982 AIAW slow-pitch softball tournament
- 1982 NCAA Division I softball tournament
- 1982 NCAA Division II softball tournament
- 1982 NCAA Division III softball tournament
- 1982 NAIA softball tournament
