= 1981 AIAW slow-pitch softball tournament =

The 1981 AIAW women's college slow-pitch softball championship was held near Raleigh, North Carolina on May 14–16. Thirteen college softball teams met in the first AIAW national slow-pitch softball tournament. The AIAW conducted only two slow-pitch softball national championships, in 1981 and 1982, as the NCAA sought to and eventually did vanquish the women's collegiate athletic organization.

== Teams ==
The double-elimination tournament included 13 teams seeded in the following order:

1. Florida State
2. East Carolina
3. North Carolina
4. South Florida
5. North Carolina State
6. Auburn
7. Florida
8. Wilmington College (Ohio)
9. Western Carolina
10. Northern Kentucky
11. Georgia Southern
12. Morehead State (Kentucky)
13. Lakeland Community College (Ohio)

Top-seeded Florida State was the victor in the tournament, winning all four of its games. The team eliminated North Carolina in the final, 4-1, and placed five players on the all-tournament team. Darby Cottle was voted the Most Valuable Player of the tournament. The Lady Seminoles won 16 consecutive games to finish out the season with a record of 54-7. JoAnne Graf, who went on to have a legendary career at the university, coached the team to Florida State's first softball national championship.

== Bracket ==
Upper round 1	Upper round 2	Upper round 3	Upper final	Final
Florida State	13
Western Carolina	9
Wilmington College	2
Western Carolina	5
Florida State	4
North Carolina State	3
North Carolina State	2
Morehead State	0
North Carolina State	3
Lakeland College	2
South Florida	1
Lakeland College	6
Florida State	12 (Note: 8 innings)
East Carolina	3
East Carolina	11
Florida	7
Florida	8
Northern Kentucky	2
East Carolina	4
North Carolina	1
North Carolina	5	Florida State	4	–
Georgia Southern	1	North Carolina	1	–
Auburn	5
Georgia Southern	12
Lower round 1	Lower round 2	Lower round 3	Lower round 4	Lower round 5	Lower final
Georgia Southern	4
North Carolina State	8
South Florida	14	South Florida	6
South Florida	2	South Florida	1
Morehead State	3
Florida	1	East Carolina	2
Florida	4
North Carolina State	4	North Carolina	3
Wilmington College	1
North Carolina	14
Lakeland College	0
North Carolina	1
Auburn	9
Auburn	1	Auburn	0
Northern Kentucky	0
Western Carolina	5
Northern Kentucky	6

== Ranking ==
Place	School	WCWS Record
1st	Florida State	4-0
2nd	North Carolina	4-2
3rd	East Carolina	2-2
4th	North Carolina State	3-2
5th	South Florida	3-2
5th	Auburn	2-2
7th	Florida	2-2
7th	Northern Kentucky	2-2
9th	Georgia Southern	1-2
9th	Western Carolina	1-2
9th	Lakeland Community College	1-2
12th	Morehead State	0-2
12th	Wilmington College	0-2

== See also ==
- AIAW Champions § Slowpitch Softball
- 1982 AIAW slow-pitch softball tournament
- 1983 National Collegiate slow-pitch softball championship
