= Darby Cottle =

American softball player

Darby Cottle Veazey (born September 26, 1961, in Tifton, Georgia) is a two-time All-American softball player and one of only two female athletes to have their number retired at Florida State University.

In her career, Cottle earned some of the highest honors ever given to a female athlete at FSU. In 1982, she was named as recipient of the prestigious Broderick Award for slow-pitch softball. Cottle was later named the amateur softball player of the year for slow-pitch softball by the United States Olympic Committee.

She was a member of consecutive AIAW national championship teams in 1981 and 1982, and was named MVP of the 1981 championship tournament.

Cottle was elected to the FSU Athletic Hall of Fame in 1988.
