= 1982 NCAA Division II softball tournament =

- Format: Double-elimination tournament
- Finals site: Stratford, Connecticut
- Champions: Sam Houston State (1st title)
- Runner-up: Cal State Northridge (1st title game)
- Winning coach: Wayne Daigle (1st title)
- Television: 3,094

The 1982 NCAA Division II softball tournament was the postseason tournament hosted by the NCAA to determine the national champion of softball among its Division II colleges and universities in the United States at the end of the 1982 NCAA Division II softball season.

The final, four-team double elimination tournament was played in Stratford, Connecticut.

Sam Houston State defeated Cal State Northridge, 3–2, in the championship game of the tournament to capture the inaugural Division II national title. While this was their first NCAA championship, Sam Houston had won the inaugural NAIA softball championship the prior season (1981).

This remains the only Division II softball tournament without someone named as Most Outstanding Player.

== Bracket ==
=== Finals ===
First Round
Sam Houston State	1
NE Missouri State	0
Winner's bracket
Cal State Northridge	1^{9}
Sacred Heart	0
NE Missouri State	3
Sacred Heart	6
Loser's bracket

Semifinals
Sam Houston State	1
Cal State Northridge	0
Cal State Northridge	1^{11}
Sacred Heart	0

Championship
Sam Houston State	0	3
Cal State Northridge	1	2

== See also ==
- 1982 NCAA Division I softball tournament
- 1982 NCAA Division III softball tournament
- 1982 NAIA softball tournament
- 1982 AIAW Women's College World Series
- 1982 AIAW slow-pitch softball tournament
- 1982 NCAA Division II baseball tournament
