= Southeastern Conference Softball Coach of the Year =

- Awarded for: the most outstanding college softball coach in the Southeastern Conference
- Country: United States

History
- First award: 1997
- Most wins: Patrick Murphy (6 wins)
- Most recent: Patrick Murphy, Alabama

The Southeastern Conference Softball Coach of the Year is a college softball award given to the Southeastern Conference's most outstanding coach. The award has been given annually since 1997.

== Winners ==
Season	Coach	School	Reference
1997	Joyce Compton	South Carolina	
1998	Larry Ray	Florida	
1999	Carie Dever-Boaz	Arkansas	
2000	Beth Kirchner	Kentucky	
2001	Yvette Girouard	LSU	
2002	Tina Deese; Yvette Girouard; Joyce Compton	Auburn; LSU; South Carolina	
2003	Lu Harris-Champer	Georgia	
2004	Ralph Weekly; Karen Weekly	Tennessee	
2005	Lu Harris-Champer	Georgia	
2006	Patrick Murphy; Yvette Girouard	Alabama; LSU	
2007	Ralph Weekly; Karen Weekly	Tennessee	
2008	Tim Walton	Florida	
2009	Tim Walton	Florida	
2010	Patrick Murphy	Alabama	
2011	Tim Walton; Yvette Girouard	Florida; LSU	
2012	Patrick Murphy	Alabama	
2013	Tim Walton	Florida	
2014	Patrick Murphy	Alabama	
2015	Clint Myers	Auburn	
2016	Rachel Lawson	Kentucky	
2017	Tim Walton	Florida	
2018	Lu Harris-Champer	Georgia	
2019	Patrick Murphy	Alabama	
2021	Courtney Deifel	Arkansas	
2022	Courtney Deifel	Arkansas	
2023	Karen Weekly	Tennessee	
2024	Karen Weekly	Tennessee	
2025	Patty Gasso	Oklahoma	
2026	Patrick Murphy	Alabama	

== Winners by school ==
School	Winners	Seasons
Alabama	6	2006, 2010, 2012, 2014, 2019, 2026
Florida	6	1998, 2008, 2009, 2011, 2013, 2017
LSU	4	2001, 2002, 2006, 2011
Tennessee	4	2004, 2007, 2023, 2024
Arkansas	3	1999, 2021, 2022
Georgia	3	2003, 2005, 2018
Auburn	2	2002, 2015
Kentucky	2	2000, 2016
South Carolina	2	1997, 2002
Oklahoma	1	2025
Mississippi State	0	—
Missouri	0	—
Ole Miss	0	—
Texas	0	—
Texas A&M	0	—
