= 2020 Florida Gators softball team =

American college softball season

2020 Florida Gators softball
- Conference: Southeastern Conference

Ranking
- Coaches: No. 6
- Record: 11–1 (0–0 SEC)
- Head coach: Tim Walton (15th season)
- Assistant coaches: Mike Bosch; Aric Thomas
- Home stadium: Katie Seashole Pressly Softball Stadium

2020 Southeastern Conference softball standings
	Conf.				Overall
Team	W		L	PCT	W		L	PCT
No. 7 Florida ‍‍‍	3	–	0	1.000	23	–	4	.852
No. 23 Missouri ‍‍‍	3	–	0	1.000	19	–	7	.731
No. 11 Kentucky ‍‍‍	2	–	1	.667	20	–	4	.833
No. 14 Georgia ‍‍‍	2	–	1	.667	23	–	5	.821
No. 10 Alabama ‍‍‍	2	–	1	.667	14	–	8	.636
No. 20 Arkansas ‍‍‍	1	–	2	.333	19	–	6	.760
No. 16 South Carolina ‍‍‍	1	–	2	.333	17	–	6	.739
Texas A&M ‍‍‍	1	–	2	.333	17	–	9	.654
No. 21 Mississippi State ‍‍‍	0	–	0	–	25	–	3	.893
No. 5 LSU ‍‍‍	0	–	0	–	21	–	3	.875
Tennessee ‍‍‍	0	–	0	–	14	–	9	.609
Auburn ‍‍‍	0	–	3	.000	16	–	11	.593
Ole Miss ‍‍‍	0	–	3	.000	12	–	13	.480
† – Conference champion ‡ – Tournament champion y – Invited to the NCAA tournament As of March 13, 2020; Rankings from NFCA

The 2020 Florida Gators softball team represented the University of Florida in the 2020 NCAA Division I softball season. The Gators played their home games at Katie Seashole Pressly Softball Stadium.

== Previous season ==
The Gators finished the 2019 season 49–18 overall, and 12–12 in the SEC to finish in a tie for sixth in the conference. The Gators hosted a Regional and Super Regional during the 2019 NCAA Division I softball tournament and later advanced to the Women's College World Series. The Gators went 0–2 in the WCWS.

== Preseason ==
=== SEC preseason poll ===
The SEC preseason poll was released on January 15, 2020.

Media poll
Predicted finish	Team
1	Alabama
2	Tennessee
3	LSU
4	Kentucky
5	Florida
6	Georgia
7	Arkansas
8	Ole Miss
9	South Carolina
10	Missouri
11	Auburn
12	Mississippi State; Texas A&M

== Schedule and results ==
2020 Florida Gators Softball Game Log
Regular season

February
Date	Opponent	Rank	Site/stadium	Score	Win	Loss	Save	TV	Attendance	Overall record	SEC record
February 7	vs. Illinois State	No. 7	USF Softball Stadium; Tampa, FL	**W** 4–1	**N. Lugo** (1–0)	A. Fox (0–1)				1–0	
February 8	vs. Fresno State	No. 7	USF Softball Stadium	**W** 6–4	**E. Hightower** (1–0)	D. East (0–1)	**N. Lugo** (1)			2–0	
February 8	vs. No. 17 Michigan	No. 7	USF Softball Stadium	**L** 2–11 (6)	A. Storako (1–0)	**N. Lugo** (1–1)				2–1	
February 9	vs. Georgia State	No. 7	USF Softball Stadium	**W** 10–0 (5)	**R. Trlicek** (1–0)	E. Buck (0–2)				3–1	
February 9	at South Florida	No. 7	USF Softball Stadium	**W** 6–1	**N. Lugo** (2–1)	C. Dolby (0–1)	**R. Trlicek** (1)		1,639	4–1	
February 11	(United States) USA National Team	No. 8	Katie Seashole Pressly Softball Stadium; Gainesville, FL	**L** 3–5	M. Abbott	**N. Lugo**		SECN+	1,935	Exh.	
February 12	North Florida	No. 8	Katie Seashole Pressly Softball Stadium	**W** 10–2 (5)	**R. Trlicek** (2–0)	H. Raulerson (0–2)		SECN+	1,124	5–1	
February 14	North Dakota State	No. 8	Katie Seashole Pressly Softball Stadium	**W** 5–0	**R. Trlicek** (3–0)	L. Lyle (0–2)			1,589	6–1	
February 14	Longwood	No. 8	Katie Seashole Pressly Softball Stadium	**W** 9–0	**N. Lugo** (3–1)	S. Backstrom (2–2)			1,589	7–1	
February 15	North Dakota State	No. 8	Katie Seashole Pressly Softball Stadium	**W** 1–0	**N. Lugo** (4–1)	P. Vargas (2–2)			1,579	8–1	
February 15	Longwood	No. 8	Katie Seashole Pressly Softball Stadium	**W** 11–0	**E. Hightower** (2–0)	A. Wood (0–2)			1,579	9–1	
February 16	Southeastern Louisiana	No. 8	Katie Seashole Pressly Softball Stadium	**W** 13–1	**R. Trlicek** (4–0)	S. Sitzman (0–1)			1,554	10–1	
February 16	Florida A&M	No. 8	Katie Seashole Pressly Softball Stadium	**W** 2–1	**E. Hightower** (3–0)	N. Zenteno (0–3)	**N. Lugo** (2)		1,554	11–1	
February 19	Jacksonville	No. 7	Katie Seashole Pressly Softball Stadium	**W** 8-0	**N. Lugo** (5-1)	A. Bilodeau (4-2)		SECN+		12-1	
February 21	vs. No. 5 Arizona; Mary Nutter Classic	No. 7	Big League Dreams; Cathedral City, CA	**W** 3-2	**R. Trlicek**(5-0)	A. Denham (4-1)	**N. Lugo** (3)			13-1	
February 21	vs. No. 25 Northwestern; Mary Nutter Classic	No. 7	Big League Dreams	**W** 3-2	**R. Trlicek** (6-0)	S. Supple 0-1				14-1	
February 22	vs. No. 16 Arizona State; Mary Nutter Classic	No. 7	Big League Dreams	**W** 4-1	**R. Trlicek** (7-0)	M. Preston 4-1				15-1	
February 22	vs. No. 1 UCLA; Mary Nutter Classic	No. 7	Big League Dreams	**L** 4-5	M. Faraimo 9-0	**R. Trlicek** (7-1)				15-2	
February 23	vs. Nebraska; Mary Nutter Classic	No. 7	Big League Dreams	**W** 6-3	**N. Lugo** (6-1)	O. Ferrell 2-4				16-2	
February 28	No. 10 Louisiana	No. 6	Katie Seashole Pressly Softball Stadium								
February 29	No. 10 Louisiana	No. 6	Katie Seashole Pressly Softball Stadium								

March
Date	Opponent	Rank	Site/stadium	Score	Win	Loss	Save	TV	Attendance	Overall record	SEC record
March 1	No. 10 Louisiana	No. 6	Katie Seashole Pressly Softball Stadium								
March 4	Florida Gulf Coast		Katie Seashole Pressly Softball Stadium								
March 6	Auburn		Katie Seashole Pressly Softball Stadium								
March 7	Auburn		Katie Seashole Pressly Softball Stadium								
March 8	Auburn		Katie Seashole Pressly Softball Stadium								
March 11	Florida State		Katie Seashole Pressly Softball Stadium								
March 13	Baylor		Katie Seashole Pressly Softball Stadium								
March 14	Baylor		Katie Seashole Pressly Softball Stadium								
March 15	Baylor		Katie Seashole Pressly Softball Stadium								
March 20	at Kentucky		John Cropp Stadium; Lexington, KY								
March 21	at Kentucky		John Cropp Stadium								
March 22	at Kentucky		John Cropp Stadium								
March 25	Bethune–Cookman		Katie Seashole Pressly Softball Stadium								
March 28	Ole Miss		Katie Seashole Pressly Softball Stadium								
March 29	Ole Miss		Katie Seashole Pressly Softball Stadium								
March 30	Ole Miss		Katie Seashole Pressly Softball Stadium								

April
Date	Opponent	Rank	Site/stadium	Score	Win	Loss	Save	TV	Attendance	Overall record	SEC record
April 1	at UCF		UCF Softball Complex; Orlando, FL								
April 3	at Tennessee		Sherri Parker Lee Stadium; Knoxville, TN								
April 4	at Tennessee		Sherri Parker Lee Stadium								
April 5	at Tennessee		Sherri Parker Lee Stadium								
April 9	Missouri		Katie Seashole Pressly Softball Stadium								
April 10	Missouri		Katie Seashole Pressly Softball Stadium								
April 11	Missouri		Katie Seashole Pressly Softball Stadium								
April 15	South Florida		Katie Seashole Pressly Softball Stadium								
April 18	at Arkansas		Bogle Park; Fayetteville, AR								
April 19	at Arkansas		Bogle Park								
April 20	at Arkansas		Bogle Park								
April 22	at Florida State		JoAnne Graf Field; Tallahassee, FL								
April 24	Georgia		Katie Seashole Pressly Softball Stadium								
April 25	Georgia		Katie Seashole Pressly Softball Stadium								
April 26	Georgia		Katie Seashole Pressly Softball Stadium								

May
Date	Opponent	Rank	Site/stadium	Score	Win	Loss	Save	TV	Attendance	Overall record	SEC record
May 1	at South Carolina		Carolina Softball Stadium; Columbia, SC								
May 2	at South Carolina		Carolina Softball Stadium								
May 3	at South Carolina		Carolina Softball Stadium								

Postseason

SEC Tournament
Date	Opponent	Seed	Site/stadium	Score	Win	Loss	Save	TV	Attendance	Overall record	SECT Record
May 6–9			Rhoads Stadium; Tuscaloosa, AL								

Legend: = Win = Loss = Cancelled
Bold = Florida team member

*Rankings are based on the team's current ranking in the NFCA poll.

== Rankings ==
Ranking movements Legend: ██ Increase in ranking ██ Decrease in ranking
	Week																
Poll	Pre	1	2	3	4	5	6	7	8	9	10	11	12	13	14	15	Final
NFCA / USA Today	7	8	7	6	7	7											
Softball America	11	14	11	10	8	7											
ESPN.com/USA Softball	9	11	9	6	8	7											
D1Softball	9	15	14	9	8	8											
