= 2020 Tennessee Volunteers softball team =

American college softball season

2020 Tennessee Volunteers softball
- Conference: Southeastern Conference

Ranking
- Coaches: No. 12
- Record: 8-6 (0–0 SEC)
- Head coach: Karen and Ralph Weekly (19th season)
- Assistant coach: Marty McDaniel
- Home stadium: Sherri Parker Lee Stadium

2020 Southeastern Conference softball standings
	Conf.				Overall
Team	W		L	PCT	W		L	PCT
No. 7 Florida ‍‍‍	3	–	0	1.000	23	–	4	.852
No. 23 Missouri ‍‍‍	3	–	0	1.000	19	–	7	.731
No. 11 Kentucky ‍‍‍	2	–	1	.667	20	–	4	.833
No. 14 Georgia ‍‍‍	2	–	1	.667	23	–	5	.821
No. 10 Alabama ‍‍‍	2	–	1	.667	14	–	8	.636
No. 20 Arkansas ‍‍‍	1	–	2	.333	19	–	6	.760
No. 16 South Carolina ‍‍‍	1	–	2	.333	17	–	6	.739
Texas A&M ‍‍‍	1	–	2	.333	17	–	9	.654
No. 21 Mississippi State ‍‍‍	0	–	0	–	25	–	3	.893
No. 5 LSU ‍‍‍	0	–	0	–	21	–	3	.875
Tennessee ‍‍‍	0	–	0	–	14	–	9	.609
Auburn ‍‍‍	0	–	3	.000	16	–	11	.593
Ole Miss ‍‍‍	0	–	3	.000	12	–	13	.480
† – Conference champion ‡ – Tournament champion y – Invited to the NCAA tournament As of March 13, 2020; Rankings from NFCA

The 2020 Tennessee Volunteers softball team represented the University of Tennessee in the 2020 NCAA Division I softball season. The Volunteers played their home games at Sherri Parker Lee Stadium.

== Previous season ==
The Volunteers finished the 2019 season 43–17 overall, and 14–10 in the SEC to finish in a tie for second in the conference. The Volunteers hosted a regional during the 2019 NCAA Division I softball tournament and later advanced to the Gainesville Super Regional against Florida. The Volunteers were defeated by the Gators 1 game to 2 as Florida advanced to the WCWS.

== Preseason ==
=== SEC preseason poll ===
The SEC preseason poll was released on January 15, 2020.

Media poll
Predicted finish	Team
1	Alabama
2	Tennessee
3	LSU
4	Kentucky
5	Florida
6	Georgia
7	Arkansas
8	Ole Miss
9	South Carolina
10	Missouri
11	Auburn
12	Mississippi State; Texas A&M

== Schedule and results ==
2020 Tennessee Volunteers Softball Game Log
Regular season

February
Date	Opponent	Rank	Site/stadium	Score	Win	Loss	Save	TV	Attendance	Overall record	SEC record
February 8	vs. No. 14 Northwestern	No. 12	Farrington Softball Stadium; Tempe, AZ	**W** 6–3	**C. Turner** (1–0)	D. Williams (1–1)				1–0	
February 8	vs. Kansas	No. 12	Farrington Softball Stadium	**W** 10–2 (6)	**S. Bender** (1–0)	T. Goff (0–2)	**C. Turner** (1)			2–0	
February 9	vs. Western Michigan	No. 12	Farrington Softball Stadium	No contest (Note: Declared "no contest" after game was stopped in the fourth innings to accommodate Western Michigan's travel plans. Tennessee led 13–6 at the time of the stoppage.)							
February 9	vs. No. 5 Arizona	No. 12	Farrington Softball Stadium	**L** 0–8 (5)	A. Denham (2–0)	**C. Turner** (1–1)		PAC12	735	2–1	
February 10	at No. 22 Arizona State	No. 12	Farrington Softball Stadium	**W** 8–5	**C. Turner** (2–1)	C. Meza (2–1)	**S. Bender** (1)	PAC12	1,172	3–1	
February 13	vs. Mexico National Team	No. 12	Nancy Almaraz Stadium; Puerto Vallarta, Mexico	**L** 0–2	D. Escobedo	K. Milloy				Exh.	
February 13	vs. Colorado State; Puerto Vallarta College Challenge	No. 12	Nancy Almaraz Stadium	**W** 6–4	**C. Turner** (3–1)	T. Gilmore (0–2)			269	4–1	
February 14	vs. Utah; Puerto Vallarta College Challenge	No. 12	Nancy Almaraz Stadium	**W** 8-5	**C. Turner** (4–1)	S. Sandez (5–2)				5-1	
February 14	vs. No. 6 Texas; Puerto Vallarta College Challenge	No. 12	Nancy Almaraz Stadium	**L** 0-11	M. Elish (3–0)	**K. Milliy** (0–1)				5-2	
February 15	vs. California Baptist; Puerto Vallarta College Challenge	No. 12	Nancy Almaraz Stadium	**W** 5-2	**C. Turner** (5–1)	K. Viramontes (2–3)				6-2	
February 21	vs. FIU	No. 12	USF Softball Stadium; Tampa, FL	**W** 9-1	**S. Bender** (2–0)	A. Muraskin				7-2	
February 21	vs. UCF	No. 12	USF Softball Stadium	L 1-10 (5)	A. White (6–1)	**C. Turner**				7-3	
February 22	vs. UCF	No. 12	USF Softball Stadium	1-9 (5)	B. Vasquez 3-0	**S. Bender** (1-1)				7-4	
February 22	at South Florida	No. 12	USF Softball Stadium	L 1-2	G. Corrick (3-3)	**C. Turner**				7-5	
February 23	at South Florida	No. 12	USF Softball Stadium	L 2-3	G. Corrick 5-3	**C. Turner**				7-6	
February 26	UT Martin	No. 20	Sherri Parker Lee Stadium; Knoxville, TN	W 3-2	**C. Turner**	E. Gallagher			1,204	8-6	
February 28	vs. Bowling Green	No. 20	Betty Basler Field; Johnson City, TN								
February 28	vs. Tennessee Tech	No. 20	Betty Basler Field								
February 29	vs. Tennessee Tech	No. 20	Betty Basler Field								
February 29	vs. Bowling Green	No. 20	Betty Basler Field								

March
Date	Opponent	Rank	Site/stadium	Score	Win	Loss	Save	TV	Attendance	Overall record	SEC record
March 1	at East Tennessee State	No. 20	Betty Basler Field								
March 4	Lipscomb		Sherri Parker Lee Stadium								
March 6	East Tennessee State		Sherri Parker Lee Stadium								
March 6	Stanford		Sherri Parker Lee Stadium								
March 7	Toledo		Sherri Parker Lee Stadium								
March 10	North Carolina		Sherri Parker Lee Stadium								
March 13	at Texas A&M		Davis Diamond; College Station, TX								
March 14	at Texas A&M		Davis Diamond								
March 15	at Texas A&M		Davis Diamond								
March 18	vs. Memphis		Ridley Sports Complex; Columbia, TN								
March 20	Alabama		Sherri Parker Lee Stadium								
March 21	Alabama		Sherri Parker Lee Stadium								
March 22	Alabama		Sherri Parker Lee Stadium								
March 24	Belmont		Sherri Parker Lee Stadium								
March 27	at Kentucky		John Cropp Stadium; Lexington, KY								
March 28	at Kentucky		John Cropp Stadium								
March 29	at Kentucky		John Cropp Stadium								

April
Date	Opponent	Rank	Site/stadium	Score	Win	Loss	Save	TV	Attendance	Overall record	SEC record
April 1	Liberty		Sherri Parker Lee Stadium								
April 3	Florida		Sherri Parker Lee Stadium								
April 4	Florida		Sherri Parker Lee Stadium								
April 5	Florida		Sherri Parker Lee Stadium								
April 11	South Carolina		Sherri Parker Lee Stadium								
April 12	South Carolina		Sherri Parker Lee Stadium								
April 13	South Carolina		Sherri Parker Lee Stadium								
April 17	at LSU		Tiger Park; Baton Rouge, LA								
April 18	at LSU		Tiger Park								
April 19	at LSU		Tiger Park								
April 22	at Western Carolina		Catamount Softball Complex; Cullowhee, NC								
April 24	Ole Miss		Sherri Parker Lee Stadium								
April 25	Ole Miss		Sherri Parker Lee Stadium								
April 26	Ole Miss		Sherri Parker Lee Stadium								

May
Date	Opponent	Rank	Site/stadium	Score	Win	Loss	Save	TV	Attendance	Overall record	SEC record
May 1	at Arkansas		Bogle Park; Fayetteville, AR								
May 2	at Arkansas		Bogle Park								
May 3	at Arkansas		Bogle Park								

Postseason

SEC Tournament
Date	Opponent	Seed	Site/stadium	Score	Win	Loss	Save	TV	Attendance	Overall record	SECT Record
May 6–9			Rhoads Stadium; Tuscaloosa, AL								

Legend: = Win = Loss = Cancelled
Bold = Tennessee team member

*Rankings are based on the team's current ranking in the NFCA poll.

== Rankings ==
Ranking movements Legend: ██ Increase in ranking ██ Decrease in ranking — = Not ranked RV = Received votes т = Tied with team above or below
	Week																
Poll	Pre	1	2	3	4	5	6	7	8	9	10	11	12	13	14	15	Final
NFCA / USA Today	12	12	12	20	RV	—											
Softball America	14	19	19	—	—	—											
ESPN.com/USA Softball	11т	12	12	22	RV	RV											
D1Softball	14	19	18	—	—	—											
