= 1982 AIAW slow-pitch softball tournament =

The 1982 AIAW women's college slow-pitch softball championship was held in Graham, North Carolina, near Raleigh, on May 13–15. Twelve college softball teams met in the second and last AIAW national slow-pitch softball tournament. The AIAW conducted only two slow-pitch softball national championships, in 1981 and 1982, as the NCAA sought to and eventually did vanquish the women's collegiate athletic organization. The Amateur Softball Association later held two collegiate slow-pitch championship tournaments in 1983 and 1984.

== Teams ==
The double-elimination tournament included these teams:

- Auburn
- Cleveland State
- East Carolina
- Florida State
- Florida
- Georgia Southern
- Lakeland Community College (Ohio)
- North Carolina
- North Carolina-Charlotte
- Northern Kentucky
- South Florida
- Western Carolina

Top-seeded Florida State won its second consecutive national championship, winning all four of its games, including a win in the final over Florida, 9–4.

== Bracket ==
The bracket included twelve teams with results as shown.

Upper round 1	Upper round 2	Upper round 3	Upper final	Final
Georgia Southern	0
Georgia Southern	12	Florida State	10
Florida State	17
Lakeland College	4
South Florida	2
Western Carolina	1
Auburn	0	South Florida	4
Florida State	19
Western Carolina	3
North Carolina-Charlotte	4
Florida	2
Florida	7	East Carolina	13
North Carolina-Charlotte	10
North Carolina	1
East Carolina	6
North Carolina-Charlotte	5
Cleveland State	2	Northern Kentucky	4
North Carolina-Charlotte	6	Florida State	9	–
Florida	4	–
Lower round 1	Lower round 2	Lower round 3	Lower round 4	Lower final
Northern Kentucky	3
Florida	W
Auburn	5
Auburn	0	South Florida	L
Florida	5	Florida	11
Florida	14
Florida	1	North Carolina-Charlotte	6
Lakeland College	4
East Carolina	0
Western Carolina	12
Western Carolina	L
Cleveland State	0
Western Carolina	7	East Carolina	W
North Carolina	2
Georgia Southern	3
North Carolina	7

== Ranking ==
Place	School	WCWS Record
1st	Florida State	4-0
2nd	Florida	6-2
3rd	North Carolina-Charlotte	3-2
4th	East Carolina	2-2
5th	Western Carolina	3-2
5th	South Florida	1-2
7th	Auburn	1-2
7th	North Carolina	1-2
9th	Georgia Southern	1-2
9th	Northern Kentucky	0-2
9th	Lakeland Community College	0-2
9th	Cleveland State	0-2

== See also ==
- 1982 AIAW Women's College World Series
- 1983 National Collegiate slow-pitch softball championship
- 1982 NCAA Division I softball tournament
- 1982 NCAA Division II softball tournament
- 1982 NCAA Division III softball tournament
- 1982 NAIA softball tournament
