= 2007 NCAA Division I softball tournament =

- Teams: 64
- Finals site: ASA Hall of Fame Stadium; Oklahoma City, Oklahoma
- Champions: Arizona (8th title)
- Runner-up: Tennessee (3rd WCWS Appearance)
- Winning coach: Mike Candrea (8th title)
- MOP: Taryne Mowatt (Arizona)

The 2007 NCAA Division I softball tournament was held from May 17 through June 4, 2007. 64 NCAA Division I college softball teams met after having played their way through a regular season, and for some, a conference tournament, to play in the NCAA Tournament. The tournament culminated with eight teams playing in the Women's College World Series at ASA Hall of Fame Stadium in Oklahoma City, Oklahoma.

== Automatic bids ==
Conference champions from 29 Division I conferences earned automatic bids to regionals. The remaining 35 spots were awarded to schools as at-large invitees.

Conference	School	Total conference invitations
America East	Albany	1
ACC	Virginia Tech	5
Atlantic Sun	Stetson	1
A-10	Massachusetts	1
Big East	Notre Dame	3
Big South	Winthrop	1
Big Ten	Ohio State	4
Big 12	Oklahoma	6
Big West	Cal Poly	5
CAA	Hofstra	1
Conference USA	Houston	1
Horizon League	Wright State	1
Ivy League	Harvard	1
MAAC	Canisius	1
MAC	Eastern Michigan	1
Mid-Con	Southern Utah	1
MEAC	Howard	1
Missouri Valley	Creighton	3
MWC	BYU	1
NEC	Long Island	1
OVC	Tennessee Tech	1
PCSC	Loyola Marymount	1
Pac-10	Arizona	8
Patriot League	Colgate	1
SEC	LSU	7
SoCon	Furman	1
Southland	Sam Houston	1
SWAC	Mississippi Valley	1
WAC	Fresno State	2

== National seeds ==
Bold indicates WCWS participant.

1. **Arizona**
2. **Northwestern**
3. Oklahoma
4. **Texas A&M**
5. **Tennessee**
6. **Washington**
7. **Arizona St.**
8. **Baylor**
9. Michigan
10. LSU
11. Alabama
12. UCLA
13. Florida
14. **DePaul**
15. North Carolina St.
16. Virginia Tech

== Regionals and super regionals ==
Bold indicates winner. "*" indicates host.

=== Tucson Super Regional ===
First round	Second round
1	**Arizona**	**9**
Howard	0
Mississippi State	0
1	**Arizona**	**8**
**Mississippi State**	**7**
Pacific	1
Tucson Regional
Howard	0
**Pacific**	**13**
Mississippi State	10
**Pacific**	**12**
16	**Virginia Tech**	**5**
Canisius	0
16	Virginia Tech	1
**Ohio State**	**2**
Cal State Fullerton	1
**Ohio State**	**2**
Columbus Regional
**Cal State Fullerton**	**8**
Canisius	0
16	Virginia Tech	0
**Cal State Fullerton**	**1**

Regional finals
1	**Arizona**	**7**	X
Pacific	0	X
Ohio State	5	3
**Cal State Fullerton**	**6**	**10**

Super regionals
1	**Arizona**	**11**	**2**	X
Cal State Fullerton	6	1	X

=== Waco Super Regional ===
First round	Second round
9	**Michigan**	**3**
Eastern Michigan	0
Louisville	3
9	**Michigan**	**6**
Oregon State	0
**Louisville**	**8**
Ann Arbor Regional
**Oregon State**	**6**
Eastern Michigan	1
Louisville	4
**Oregon State**	**11**
8	**Baylor**	**8**
Albany	2
8	**Baylor**	**7**
Hofstra	2
Harvard	2
**Hofstra**	**3**
Hempstead Regional
**Albany**	**1**
Harvard	0
Hofstra	2
**Albany**	**4**

Regional finals
9	**Michigan**	**7**	X
Oregon State	0	X
8	**Baylor**	**10**	X
Albany	0	X

Super regionals
9	Michigan	0	**3**	0
8	**Baylor**	**9**	0	**4**

=== Knoxville Super Regional ===
First round	Second round
5	**Tennessee**	**8**
Furman	0
5	**Tennessee**	**2**
North Carolina	0
**North Carolina**	**4**
Winthrop	3
Knoxville Regional
**Winthrop**	**11**
Furman	1
North Carolina	3
**Winthrop**	**6**
12	**UCLA**	**6**
Loyola Marymount	3
12	UCLA	1
**Hawaii**	**3**
UC Santa Barbara	0
**Hawaii**	**2**
Los Angeles Regional
UC Santa Barbara	3
**Loyola Marymount**	**5**
12	UCLA	2
**Loyola Marymount**	**4**

Regional finals
5	**Tennessee**	**7**	X
Winthrop	0	X
**Hawaii**	**9**	X
Loyola Marymount	0	X

Super regionals
5	**Tennessee**	**9**	6	**7**
Hawaii	0	**9**	1

=== College Station Super Regional ===
First round	Second round
13	**Florida**	**7**
Stetson	0
13	**Florida**	**8**
Georgia Tech	0
Texas	2
**Georgia Tech**	**3**
Gainesville Regional
**Texas**	**2**
Stetson	0
Georgia Tech	2
**Texas**	**4**
**Houston**	**4**
Louisiana–Lafayette	3
**Houston**	**8**
4	Texas A&M	1
Sam Houston State	5
4	**Texas A&M**	**9**
College Station Regional
**Sam Houston State**	**2**
Louisiana–Lafayette	1
4	**Texas A&M**	**11**
Sam Houston State	0

Regional finals
13	**Florida**	**3**	X
Texas	0	X
Houston	2	0
4	**Texas A&M**	**13**	**5**

Super regionals
13	Florida	0	**3**	0
4	**Texas A&M**	**2**	2	**2**

=== Norman Super Regional ===
First round	Second round
3	**Oklahoma**	**5**
Colgate	2
3	**Oklahoma**	**2**
UMass	0
Long Island	3
**UMass**	**4**
Amherst Regional
**Long Island**	**5**
Colgate	1
**UMass**	**7**
Long Island	3
**Missouri**	**8**
Southern Illinois	0
Missouri	0
14	**DePaul**	**2**
Mississippi Valley State	0
14	**DePaul**	**10**
Carbondale Regional
Mississippi Valley State	0
**Southern Illinois**	**7**
**Missouri**	**7**
Southern Illinois	4

Regional finals
3	**Oklahoma**	**6**	X
UMass	3	X
14	**DePaul**	**3**	X
Missouri	0	X

Super regionals
3	Oklahoma	0	2	X
14	**DePaul**	**3**	**7**	X

=== Seattle Super Regional ===
First round	Second round
11	Alabama	2
**Tennessee Tech**	**4**
California	1
**Tennessee Tech**	**3**
**California**	**13**
Florida State	6
Tuscaloosa Regional
11	**Alabama**	**6**
Florida State	3
California	1
11	**Alabama**	13
Nebraska	2
**Georgia**	**3**
6	**Washington**	**8**
Georgia	0
Creighton	1
6	**Washington**	**5**
Lincoln Regional
Nebraska	1
**Creighton**	**2**
**Georgia**	**3**
Creighton	0

Regional finals
Tennessee Tech	10	2
11	**Alabama**	**19**	**7**
6	**Washington**	1	**1**
Georgia	**2**	0

Super regionals
11	Alabama	3	5	X
6	**Washington**	**4**	**7**	X

=== Tempe Super Regional ===
First round	Second round
7	**Arizona State**	**2**
Southern Utah	1
7	**Arizona State**	7
BYU	1
BYU	**9**
Cal Poly	0
Provo Regional
**Southern Utah**	**9**
Cal Poly	4
Southern Utah	5
**BYU**	**10**
Stanford	0
**Fresno State**	**2**
10	**LSU**	**1**
Fresno State	0
Cal State Northridge	2
10	**LSU**	**3**
Palo Alto Regional
**Stanford**	**3**
Cal State Northridge	0
Fresno State	0
**Stanford**	**1**

Regional finals
7	**Arizona State**	**6**	X
BYU	3	X
10	**LSU**	**11**	X
Stanford	5	X

Super regionals
10	LSU	0	4	X
7	**Arizona State**	**1**	**7**	X

=== Evanston Super Regional ===
First round	Second round
15	NC State	2
**South Carolina**	**5**
**Oregon**	**8**
South Carolina	4
Penn State	0
**Oregon**	**4**
Columbia Regional
15	**NC State**	**1**
Penn State	0
**South Carolina**	**4**
15	NC State	3
**Illinois State**	**2**
Notre Dame	1
Illinois State	2
2	**Northwestern**	**5**
Wright State	1
2	**Northwestern**	**4**
Evanston Regional
Wright State	0
**Notre Dame**	**3**
**Illinois State**	**3**
Notre Dame	1

Regional finals
Oregon	0	3
**South Carolina**	**2**	**4**
2	**Northwestern**	**4**	X
Illinois State	1	X

Super regionals
South Carolina	1	0	X
2	**Northwestern**	**6**	**3**	X

== Women's College World Series ==
=== Participants ===
School	Conference	Record (conference)	Head coach	WCWS appearances† (including 2007 WCWS)	WCWS best finish†	WCWS W–L record†
Arizona	Pac-10	44–12–1 (15–9)	Mike Candrea	19 (last: 2006)	1st (1991, 1993, 1994, 1996, 1997, 2001, 2006)	51–23
Arizona State	Pac-10	54–15 (13–8)	Clint Myers	6 (last: 2006)	3rd (1982)	5–10
Baylor	Big 12	50–14 (14–3)	Glenn Moore	1	—	0–0
DePaul	Big East	46–11 (20–0)	Eugene Lenti	4 (last: 2005)	3rd (1999)	2–6
Northwestern	Big Ten	50–11 (15–3)	Kate Drohan	5 (last: 2006)	2nd (2006)	12–9
Tennessee	SEC	59–6 (23–4)	Ralph Weekly; Karen Weekly	3 (last: 2006)	3rd (2005, 2006)	6–4
Texas A&M	Big 12	46–12 (12–6)	Jo Evans	6 (last: 1988)	1st (1983, 1987)	18–8
Washington	Pac-10	40–17 (12–9)	Heather Tarr	8 (last: 2004)	2nd (1996, 1999)	13–12

† Excludes results of the pre-NCAA Women's College World Series of 1969 through 1981.

=== Tournament notes ===
- Washington's Danielle Lawrie and Tennessee's Monica Abbott each pitched no-hitters on the first day of the tournament, although Lawrie allowed a run. This is the first time a no-hitter has been accomplished since the 2003 Women's College World Series and only the third time in the NCAA era of the WCWS that two pitchers had no-hitters on the same day.
- This was the first time that UCLA did not advance to the WCWS in its NCAA era.
- Only one game in the entire tournament ended with the losing team scoring more than one run, an NCAA record for offensive futility.

=== Bracket ===
First round
1	**Arizona**	**2**^{9}
8	Baylor	1
4	Texas A&M	0
5	**Tennessee**	**2**
8	**Baylor**	**7**
4	Texas A&M	4
14	DePaul	1
6	**Washington**	**3**
2	**Northwestern**	**2**
7	Arizona State	0
7	Arizona State	1
14	**DePaul**	**3**

Second round
1	Arizona	0
5	**Tennessee**	**1**
8	Baylor	0
2	**Northwestern**	**7**
6	**Washington**	**9**^{5}
2	Northwestern	0
14	DePaul	0
1	**Arizona**	**3**

Semifinals
5	**Tennessee**	**3**	—
2	Northwestern	0	—
6	Washington	0	1
1	**Arizona**	**2**	**8**

Finals
5	Tennessee	**3**	0	0
1	**Arizona**	0	**1**^{10}	**5**

==== Game results ====
Date	Game	Winner	Score	Loser	Notes
5/31/2007	Game 1	Washington	3 – 1	DePaul	
5/31/2007	Game 2	Northwestern	2 – 0	Arizona State	
5/31/2007	Game 3	Tennessee	2 – 0	Texas A&M	
5/31/2007	Game 4	Arizona	2 – 1	Baylor	9 inn.
6/1/2007	Game 5	Washington	9 – 0	Northwestern	5 inn.
6/1/2007	Game 6	Tennessee	1 – 0	Arizona	
6/2/2007	Game 7	DePaul	3 – 1	Arizona State	Arizona State eliminated
6/2/2007	Game 8	Baylor	7 – 4	Texas A&M	Texas A&M eliminated
6/2/2007	Game 9	Arizona	3 – 0	DePaul	DePaul eliminated
6/2/2007	Game 10	Northwestern	7 – 0	Baylor	Baylor eliminated
6/3/2007	Game 11	Arizona	2 – 0	Washington	
6/3/2007	Game 12	Tennessee	3 – 0	Northwestern	Northwestern eliminated
6/3/2007	Game 13	Arizona	8 – 1	Washington	Washington eliminated
6/4/2007	Finals game 1	Tennessee	3 – 0	Arizona	
6/5/2007	Finals game 2	Arizona	1 – 0	Tennessee	10 inn.
6/6/2007	Finals game 3	Arizona	5 – 0	Tennessee	Arizona wins WCWS

==== Championship game ====
School	Top Batter	Stats.
Arizona	Chelsie Mesa (2B)	2-3 3RBIs HR
Tennessee	Kenora Posey (2B)	2-2 SB

School	Pitcher	IP	H	R	ER	BB	SO	AB	BF
Arizona	Taryne Mowatt (W)	7.0	7	0	0	4	11	28	33
Tennessee	Monica Abbott (L)	6.0	10	5	5	4	7	26	31

==== Final standings ====
Place	School	WCWS record
1st	Arizona	6-2
2nd	Tennessee	4-2
3rd	Washington	2-2
3rd	Northwestern	2-2
5th	Baylor	1-2
5th	DePaul	1-2
7th	Texas A&M	0-2
7th	Arizona State	0-2

=== All Tournament Team ===
The following players were members of the All-Tournament Team.

Position	Player	Class	School
Pitcher	Monica Abbott	Senior	Tennessee
Pitcher	Danielle Lawrie	Sophomore	Washington
1st Base	Dena Tyson	Senior	Washington
1st Base	Ashley Monceaux	Senior	Baylor
3rd Base	Jenae Leles	Sophomore	Arizona
Shortstop	Ashley Charters	Junior	Washington
Shortstop	Kristie Fox	Senior	Arizona
Shortstop	Tammy Williams	Sophomore	Northwestern
Outfield	India Chiles	Senior	Tennessee
Outfield	Caitlin Lowe	Senior	Arizona
Outfield	Lindsay Schutzler	Senior	Tennessee
**Most Outstanding Player**	**Taryne Mowatt**	**Junior**	**Arizona**

=== WCWS records tied or broken ===
- The 2007 tournament was ruled by pitchers, as 11 shutouts were thrown over the week, an NCAA record. Tennessee alone didn't allow a run in the entire tournament until the 10th inning of the second game of the finals.
- After fanning 11 Lady Vols in the final game, Arizona's Taryne Mowatt passed Tennessee's Monica Abbott for the WCWS single-season NCAA strikeout record. Mowatt struck out 76 batters in 2007, while Abbott finished with 75 strikeouts. (Both passed the previous record held by the previous Arizona pitcher, Alicia Hollowell, who held the record with 65).
- Mowatt's 60 innings pitched in the 2007 College World Series broke the previous NCAA record of 53 held by Michigan's Jennie Ritter (2005). Mowatt delivered every Arizona pitch in this year's event.
- Arizona's Kristie Fox recorded her 11th hit of the 2007 WCWS, tying the NCAA record of UCLA's Natasha Watley set in 2003.
- The Lady Vols’ Kenora Posey tied the WCWS single-season NCAA steals record with four. She shares the top spot with Lowe, who had four steals in 2006, and two others.
- The 2007 event marked the best-attended Women's College World Series in history. A total of 62,463 fans passed through the gates of ASA Hall of Fame Stadium, including 5,533 for the third game. The 2007 attendance total broke the previous WCWS record (set in 2006) by 16,341.

== See also ==
- NCAA Division I Softball Championship
