= Sam Houston Bearkats softball =

- 2026 Sam Houston Bearkats softball team
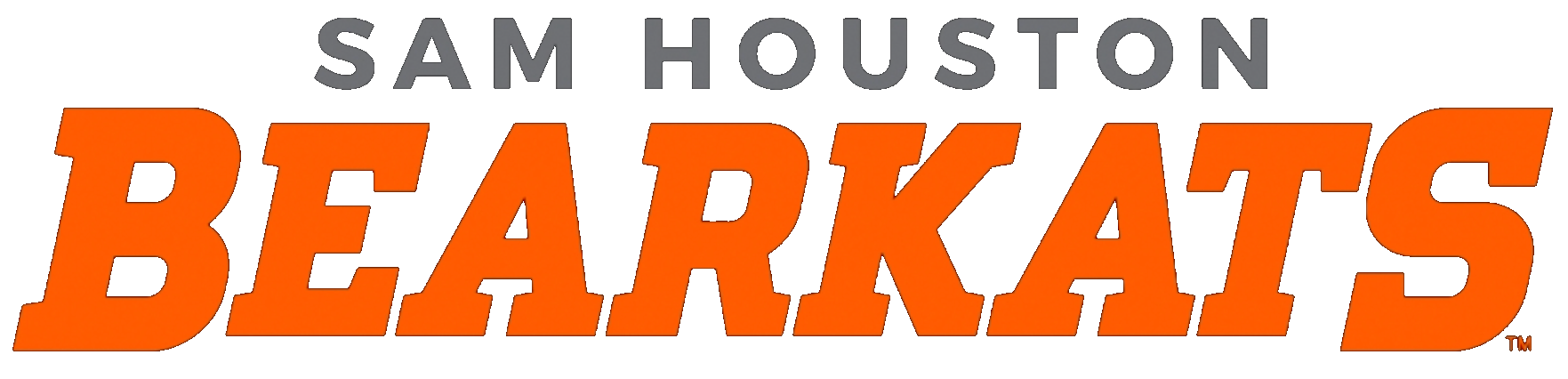
- University: Sam Houston State University
- Head coach: Garrett Valis (8th season)
- Conference: C-USA
- Location: Huntsville, Texas, US
- Home stadium: Bearkat Softball Complex (capacity: 400)
- Nickname: Bearkats
- Colors: Orange and white

NCAA Tournament champions
- NAIA: 1981; NCAA DII: 1982; DI NIT: 1993

NCAA WCWS appearances
- NAIA: 1981; NCAA DII: 1982 • 1983 • 1984

NCAA Tournament appearances
- NCAA DII: 1982 • 1983 • 1984; NCAA DI: 2007, 2019

Conference tournament championships
- 1988 • 2007

Regular-season conference championships
- 1988 • 1990 • 1993

The Sam Houston Bearkats softball is the team represents Sam Houston State University in NCAA Division I college softball. The team participates in Conference USA. The Bearkats are currently led by head coach Garrett Valis. The team play their home games at the Bearkat Softball Complex located on the university's campus.

== History ==
=== Early history (1980–1990) ===
Sam Houston softball first began in 1980. The team was immediately successful as it saw a 19–5 record in its very first season. In only its second season, the team captured its first of three national titles in the 1981 NAIA national softball championship with a 1–0 victory over the Emporia State Lady Hornets. Beginning with the 1982 season, the Bearkats moved up to NCAA Division II but saw no signs of slowing down as they earned three straight DII College World Series berths, with another national title in 1982. Following their third consecutive WCWS season in 1983, SHSU softball continued to win, and reached DII regionals the next two years. In 1987, the team failed to make a regional appearance despite a successful 34-26 campaign. This was the first season the softball team did not reach the playoffs since the team's first year. In the 1988 season, the Bearkats were invited to play in the Southland Conference, where the softball team reached the conference tournament in the next three years, including two conference championship seasons.

=== Rebuilding (1991–2001) ===
Throughout the early part of the '90s the softball team continued to be a force, earning at least a top 2 conference finish through the 1993 season. In 1993, Sam Houston would win the last of its three claimed national titles, winning the Women's NIT softball tournament. After this successful season, however, the program would begin its run of mediocrity and never saw a top 4 conference finish again until current head coach Bob Brock took over in 2002.

=== The Bob Brock era (2002–present) ===
Bearkat Softball had never seen as much stability in the head coach position as it has since 2002, as Bob Brock is still the most tenured coach in Sam Houston's history. In Bob Brock's 14 seasons, he coached the softball team to 9 Southland Tournament berths. The 2012 season was his most successful as the Bearkats lost a thriller to Northwestern State in the conference title game.

== Year-by-year results ==
Year	Head coach	Collegiate Record	Conference Record	Notes
Independent (Lone Star Conference in Other Sports)
1980	Wayne Daigle	19–5	–	
1981	Wayne Daigle	32–11	–	NAIA Women's College World Series Champions
1982	Wayne Daigle	40–6	–	Division II Women's College World Series Champions
1983	Wayne Daigle	43–17	–	NCAA Division II Women's College World Series (2nd Place)
Gulf Star Conference - NCAA Division II
1984	Brenda Marshall	32–22	0–0	
1985	Brenda Marshall	37–11	10–4	NCAA Division II Regionals
1986	Brenda Marshall	39–16	14–6	NCAA Division II Regionals
Gulf Star Conference - Begin NCAA DI Play
1987	Kalum Haack	34–26	13–7	
Southland Conference
1988	Annie Westfall	49–17	13–1	Conference Regular Season Champions; SLC Tournament Champion
1989	Annie Westfall	37–20	9–3	2nd, Conference Regular Season, SLC Tournament, 3rd Place; National NIT (8th place)
1990	Annie Westfall	25–34	9–3	Conference Regular Season Champions; SLC Tournament, 3rd Place
1991	Marty Blowers	37–23	18–6	2nd, Conference Regular Season
1992	Marty Blowers	41–21	18–10	2nd Conference Regular Season (T)
1993	Marty Blowers	39–15	24–4	Conference Regular Season Champions; National NIT Champions
1994	Marty Blowers	18–35–1	13–18–1	6th Regular Season
1995	Marty Blowers	19–33	15–17	5th Regular Season
1996	Marty Blowers	23–25	12–12	5th Regular Season
1997	Laniegh Clark	14–32	9–15	7th Regular Season
1998	Laniegh Clark	14–35	4–22	10th Regular Season
1999	John Garris	18–38	6–21	10th Regular Season
2000	John Garris	18–38	4–22	9th Regular Season
2001	John Garris	20–34	2–25	10th Regular Season
2002	Bob Brock	11–31	9–18	8th Regular Season
2003	Bob Brock	23–33	12–15	6th Regular Season, SLC Tournament, 3rd Place
2004	Bob Brock	29–23	17–9	3rd Regular Season, SLC Tournament, 3rd Place
2005	Bob Brock	29–25	19–7	2nd Regular Season, SLC Tournament Finalist
2006	Bob Brock	18–30	11–16	7th Regular Season
2007	Bob Brock	38–26	20–10	2nd Regular Season, SLC Tournament Champion; NCAA Division I Regional (1 win–2 losses)
2008	Bob Brock	30–31	15–15	7th Regular Season, SLC Tournament, 1st Round
2009	Bob Brock	28–26	15–14	6th Regular Season, SLC Tournament, 3rd Place
2010	Bob Brock	21–28	13–16	9th Regular Season
2011	Bob Brock	22–32	14–15	7th Regular Season
2012	Bob Brock	29–21	14–6	2nd Regular Season, SLC Tournament Finalist
2013	Bob Brock	37–34	17–10	3rd Regular Season, SLC Tournament Finalist
2014	Bob Brock	27–27	15–11	3rd Regular Season, SLC Tournament, 3rd Round
2015	Bob Brock	19–28	10–15	3rd (West)
2016	Bob Brock	21–31	13–14	3rd (West), SLC Tournament, Second Round
2017	Bob Brock	24–27	14–13	2nd (West), SLC Tournament, Second Round
2018	Bob Brock	24–33	13–14	2nd (West), SLC Tournament, Second Round
2019	Garrett Valis	35–23	22–5	SLC Regular Season Champions, SLC Tournament Champions, NCAA Regionals
2020	Garrett Valis	11–17	2–3	Season cancelled due to the COVID-19 pandemic
2021	Garrett Valis	19–30	14–13	6th Regular Season, SLC Tournament, Second Round

== Postseason appearances ==
=== Conference tournaments ===
Year	Head coach	Record	%	Notes
Southland Conference Tournament Results
1988	Annie Westfall	4–0	1.000	Tournament Champion
1989	Annie Westfall	2–2	.500	Semi-Finalist
1990	Annie Westfall	2–2	.500	Semi-finalist
1991-95 No Conference Tournament
2003	Bob Brock	2–2	.500	3rd Round
2004	Bob Brock	2–2	.500	3rd Round
2005	Bob Brock	3–2	.600	Finalist
2007	Bob Brock	4–1	.800	Tournament Champion
2008	Bob Brock	0–1	.000	1st Round
2009	Bob Brock	2–2	.500	2nd Round
2012	Bob Brock	3–2	.600	Finalist
2013	Bob Brock	5–2	.714	Finalist
2014	Bob Brock	1–2	.333	2nd Round
Total		31–20	.608	12 Appearances

=== NCAA Division I Tournament results ===
The Bearkats have appeared in one NCAA Division I Tournaments. Their combined record is 1–2.

Year	Round	Opponent	Result/Score
NCAA Division I Tournament Results
2007	First Game; Second Game; Third Game	Texas A&M; Louisiana–Lafayette; Texas A&M	L 5–9; W 2–1 (8); L 0–11

=== NIT Division I Tournament results ===
In 1993, the Bearkats appeared in the Division I NIT softball tournament. They won the tournament championship with a record of 3–0.

Year	Round	Opponent	Result/Score
NCAA Division I Tournament Results
1993	First Game; Second Game; Third Game	DePaul; Princeton; Chicago–Illinois	W 7–2; W 3–0; W 3–2

== See also ==
- List of NCAA Division I softball programs
