= 2007 NCAA Division I softball season =

American college softball season

- Defending Champions: Arizona

Tournament

Women's College World Series
- Champions: Arizona (8th title)
- Runners-up: Tennessee (3rd WCWS Appearance)
- Winning Coach: Mike Candrea (8th title)
- WCWS MOP: Taryne Mowatt (Arizona)

Seasons
- ← 2006 2008 →

The 2007 NCAA Division I softball season, play of college softball in the United States organized by the National Collegiate Athletic Association (NCAA) at the Division I level, began in February 2007. The season progressed through the regular season, many conference tournaments and championship series, and concluded with the 2007 NCAA Division I softball tournament and 2007 Women's College World Series. The Women's College World Series, consisting of the eight remaining teams in the NCAA Tournament and held in held in Oklahoma City at ASA Hall of Fame Stadium, ended on June 6, 2007.

== Conference standings ==
2007 Big 12 Conference softball standings
	Conf.						Overall
Team	W		L		T	PCT	W		L		T	PCT
No. 5 Baylor ‍†‍‍^{y}	14	–	3	–	0	.824	51	–	16	–	0	.761
No. 11 Oklahoma ‍‍‍^{y}	14	–	4	–	0	.778	55	–	8	–	0	.873
Missouri ‍‍‍^{y}	13	–	4	–	0	.765	40	–	24	–	0	.625
No. 7 Texas A&M ‍‍‡‍^{y}	12	–	6	–	0	.667	46	–	14	–	0	.767
Nebraska ‍‍‍^{y}	10	–	8	–	0	.556	37	–	20	–	0	.649
No. 24 Texas ‍‍‍^{y}	8	–	10	–	0	.444	35	–	20	–	0	.636
Kansas ‍‍‍	7	–	11	–	0	.389	33	–	24	–	1	.578
Texas Tech ‍‍‍	4	–	12	–	0	.250	24	–	27	–	0	.471
Oklahoma State ‍‍‍	3	–	15	–	0	.167	25	–	33	–	0	.431
Iowa State ‍‍‍	3	–	15	–	0	.167	24	–	40	–	0	.375
† – Conference champion ‡ – Tournament champion y – Invited to the NCAA tournament Rankings from NFCA

2007 Big Ten Conference softball standings
	Conf.				Overall
Team	W		L	PCT	W		L	PCT
No. 23 Ohio State ‍†‍‡‍^{y}	14	–	2	.875	40	–	18	.690
No. 4 Northwestern ‍‍‍^{y}	15	–	3	.833	52	–	13	.800
No. 13 Michigan ‍‍‍^{y}	12	–	4	.750	47	–	13	.783
Iowa ‍‍‍	10	–	7	.588	37	–	21	.638
Penn State ‍‍‍^{y}	10	–	9	.526	36	–	23	.610
Purdue ‍‍‍	10	–	9	.526	33	–	32	.508
Illinois ‍‍‍	7	–	8	.467	30	–	25	.545
Michigan State ‍‍‍	7	–	10	.412	33	–	26	.559
Wisconsin ‍‍‍	6	–	12	.333	27	–	20	.574
Minnesota ‍‍‍	4	–	9	.308	24	–	22	.522
Indiana ‍‍‍	1	–	19	.050	21	–	34	.382
† – Conference champion ‡ – Tournament champion y – Invited to the NCAA tournament As of June 4, 2007; Rankings from NFCA

2007 Pacific-10 Conference softball standings
	Conf.						Overall
Team	W		L		T	PCT	W		L		T	PCT
Arizona ‍†‍‍^{y}	15	–	5	–	1	.738	50	–	14	–	1	.777
Arizona State ‍‍‍^{y}	13	–	8	–	0	.619	54	–	17	–	0	.761
Washington ‍‍‍^{y}	12	–	9	–	0	.571	42	–	19	–	0	.689
UCLA ‍‍‍^{y}	12	–	9	–	0	.571	37	–	18	–	0	.673
Oregon State ‍‍‍^{y}	10	–	11	–	0	.476	41	–	23	–	0	.641
Stanford ‍‍‍^{y}	7	–	13	–	1	.357	35	–	21	–	1	.623
Oregon ‍‍‍^{y}	7	–	14	–	0	.333	44	–	19	–	0	.698
California ‍‍‍^{y}	7	–	14	–	0	.333	34	–	32	–	0	.515
† – Conference champion y – Invited to the NCAA tournament As of August 5, 2007; Rankings from Coaches' Poll

2007 Southland Conference softball standings
	Conf.						Overall
Team	W		L		T	PCT	W		L		T	PCT
Texas–Arlington ‍†‍‍	19	–	5	–	0	.792	36	–	16	–	0	.692
Sam Houston State ‍‍‍^{y}	20	–	10	–	0	.667	38	–	26	–	0	.594
Texas State ‍‍‍	18	–	12	–	0	.600	32	–	26	–	0	.552
Texas–San Antonio ‍‍‍	18	–	12	–	0	.600	27	–	31	–	0	.466
Nicholls State ‍‍‍	15	–	11	–	0	.577	27	–	28	–	0	.491
McNeese State ‍‍‍	16	–	12	–	0	.571	30	–	32	–	0	.484
Northwestern State ‍‍‍	17	–	13	–	0	.567	29	–	29	–	0	.500
Southeastern Louisiana ‍‍‍	12	–	17	–	0	.414	31	–	27	–	0	.534
Stephen F. Austin ‍‍‍	12	–	18	–	0	.400	19	–	37	–	0	.339
Central Arkansas ‍‍‍	6	–	24	–	0	.200	16	–	42	–	0	.276
Texas A&M–Corpus Christi ‍‍‍	5	–	25	–	0	.167	12	–	38	–	0	.240
† – Conference champion y – Invited to the NCAA tournament As of May 20, 2007; Rankings from Coaches' Poll

== Women's College World Series ==
The 2007 NCAA Women's College World Series took place from May 31 to June 6, 2007 in Oklahoma City.

First round
1	Arizona	2^{9}
8	Baylor	1
4	Texas A&M	0
5	Tennessee	2
8	Baylor	7
4	Texas A&M	4
14	DePaul	1
6	Washington	3
2	Northwestern	2
7	Arizona State	0
7	Arizona State	1
14	DePaul	3

Second round
1	Arizona	0
5	Tennessee	1
8	Baylor	0
2	Northwestern	7
6	Washington	9^{5}
2	Northwestern	0
14	DePaul	0
1	Arizona	3

Semifinals
5	Tennessee	3	—
2	Northwestern	0	—
6	Washington	0	1
1	Arizona	2	8

Finals
5	Tennessee	3	0	0
1	Arizona	0	1^{10}	5

== Season leaders ==
Batting

- Batting average: .492 – Kaitlin Cochran, Arizona State Sun Devils
- RBIs: 81 – Samantha Ricketts, Oklahoma Sooners
- Home runs: 25 – Beth Boden, Tennessee Tech Golden Eagles

Pitching

- Wins: 50-5 – Monica Abbott, Tennessee Volunteers
- ERA: 0.56 (25 ER/311.1 IP) – Angela Tincher Virginia Tech Hokies
- Strikeouts: 724 – Monica Abbott, Tennessee Volunteers

== Records ==
NCAA Division I season strikeouts: 724 – Monica Abbott, Tennessee Volunteers

Junior class strikeouts: 617 – Angela Tincher, Virginia Tech Hokies

Team strikeout ratio: 13.5 (910 SO/470.0 IP) – Tennessee Volunteers

Team fielding percentage: .988% – Tennessee Volunteers

== Awards ==
- USA Softball Collegiate Player of the Year:

Monica Abbott, Tennessee Volunteers

- Honda Sports Award Softball:

Monica Abbott, Tennessee Volunteers

- Women's Sports Foundation Sportswoman of the Year Award Team:

Monica Abbott, Tennessee Lady Vols

YEAR	W	L	GP	GS	CG	SHO	SV	IP	H	R	ER	BB	SO	ERA	WHIP
2007	50	5	63	52	45	29	5	358.1	136	36	35	63	724	0.68	0.55

- Best Female College Athlete ESPY Award

Taryne Mowatt, Arizona Wildcats

YEAR	W	L	GP	GS	CG	SHO	SV	IP	H	R	ER	BB	SO	ERA	WHIP
2007	42	12	60	53	50	19	3	370.0	205	90	77	168	522	1.45	1.01

== All America Teams ==
The following players were members of the All-American Teams.

First Team

Position	Player	Class	School
P	Monica Abbott	SR.	Tennessee Lady Vols
P	Angela Tincher	JR.	Virginia Tech Hokies
P	Katie Burkhart	JR.	Arizona State Sun Devils
C	Killian Roessner	JR.	LSU Tigers
1B	Dena Tyson	SR.	Washington Huskies
2B	Lauren Parker	SO.	Alabama Crimson Tide
3B	Norrelle Dickson	SR.	Oklahoma Sooners
SS	Jenn Salling	FR.	Oregon Ducks
OF	India Chiles	SR.	Tennessee Lady Vols
OF	Caitlin Lowe	SR.	Arizona Wildcats
OF	Kaitlin Cochran	SO.	Arizona State Sun Devils
UT	Danielle Lawrie	SO.	Washington Huskies
UT	Chelsea Bramlett	FR.	Mississippi State Bulldogs
AT-L	Megan Gibson	JR.	Texas A&M Aggies
AT-L	Caitlin Lever	SO.	Georgia Tech Yellowjackets
AT-L	Lisa Modglin	JR.	Oklahoma Sooners
AT-L	Amanda Scarborough	JR.	Texas A&M Aggies
AT-L	Tammy Williams	SO.	Northwestern Wildcats

Second Team

Position	Player	Class	School
P	Eileen Canney	SR.	Northwestern Wildcats
P	Taryne Mowatt	JR.	Arizona Wildcats
P	Stacey Nelson	SO.	Florida Gators
C	Rachel Folden	JR.	Marshall Thundering Herd
1B	Tonya Callahan	JR.	Tennessee Lady Vols
2B	Lisa Dodd	SR.	UCLA Bruins
3B	Kara Nelson	FR.	Illinois State Redbirds
SS	Amber Jackson	SR.	Maryland Terrapins
OF	Krista Colburn	JR.	UCLA Bruins
OF	Danielle Kinley	SO.	Penn State Nittany Lions
OF	Brittany Rogers	SO.	Alabama Crimson Tide
UT	Kate Robinson	JR.	Hawaii Rainbow Wahine
UT	Susan Ogden	JR.	Oklahoma Sooners
AT-L	Tracie Adix	SR.	DePaul Blue Demons
AT-L	Ashley Charters	JR.	Washington Huskies
AT-L	Samantha Ricketts	SO.	Oklahoma Sooners
AT-L	Lindsay Schutzler	SR.	Tennessee Lady Vols
AT-L	Clare Warwick	SO.	Hawaii Rainbow Wahine

Third Team

Position	Player	Class	School
P	Lauren Eckermann	JR.	Oklahoma Sooners
P	Robin Mackin	SO.	Fresno State Bulldogs
P	Chrissy Owens	JR.	Alabama Crimson Tide
C	Courtney Totte	SR.	Oklahoma State Cowgirls
1B	Garland Cooper	SR.	Northwestern Wildcats
2B	Veronica Wootson	SR.	FSU Seminoles
3B	Brette Reagan	SO.	Baylor Bears
SS	Aileen Morales	JR.	Georgia Tech Yellowjackets
OF	Gina Carbonatto	SR.	Pacific Tigers
OF	Angela Findlay	FR.	Michigan Wolverines
OF	Leslie Klein	SR.	LSU Tigers
UT	Abbie Sims	SR.	NC State Wolfpack
UT	Tyleen Tausaga	SR.	Hawaii Rainbow Wahine
AT-L	Jennifer Curtier	SR.	Pacific Tigers
AT-L	Alissa Haber	FR.	Stanford Cardinal
AT-L	Becca Heteniak	FR.	DePaul Blue Demons
AT-L	Ashley Monceaux	SR.	Baylor Bears
AT-L	Kim Waleszonia	SO.	Florida Gators
