= NAIA softball championship =

College softball tournament

NAIA Softball World Series
- Sport: Softball
- Founded: 1981
- Organising body: National Association of Intercollegiate Athletics (NAIA)
- Country: United States
- Most recent champion: Madonna (1st)
- Most titles: Oklahoma City (11)
- Streaming partner: Urban Edge Network
- Website: NAIA.com

The NAIA softball championship, referred to as the NAIA Softball World Series, is the annual tournament to determine the national champions of NAIA collegiate softball in the United States and formerly in Canada. It has been held annually since 1981. The South Commons Softball Complex in Columbus, Georgia is the most recent host, having hosted the tournament since 2021.

The reigning national champions are the Madonna Crusaders, who won their first title in 2026.

Oklahoma City is the winningest program, with eleven NAIA championship titles.

== Results ==
NAIA Softball World Series
Year	Site	Championship game			
Year	Site	Champion	Score	Runner-up	
1981; Details	Conroe, Texas	Sam Houston State	1–0*	Emporia State	
1982; Details	Kearney, Nebraska	Missouri Western	5–0	St. Francis (IL)	
1983; Details	Kearney, Nebraska	Emporia State	9–2	Kearney State	
1984; Details	Indianapolis, Indiana	Emporia State (2)	1–0	Quincy	
1985; Details	Indianapolis, Indiana	Quincy	4–2	Washburn	
1986; Details	San Antonio, Texas	St. Mary's (TX)	2–1 (9 innings)*	Oklahoma City	
1987; Details	Kearney, Nebraska	Kearney State	1–0	Francis Marion	
1988; Details	Oklahoma City, Oklahoma	Pacific Lutheran	2–0 (10 innings)	Minnesota Duluth	
1989; Details	Midland, Michigan	Saginaw Valley State	3–0	Kearney State	
1990; Details	Pensacola, Florida	Kearney State (2)	6–3 (8 innings)	Pacific Lutheran	
1991; Details	Columbia, Missouri	Hawaii Loa	5–1	Puget Sound	
1992; Details	Pensacola, Florida	Pacific Lutheran (2)	3–2	Kennesaw State	
1993; Details	Columbia, Missouri	West Florida	4–2*	Oklahoma City	
1994; Details	Columbia, Missouri	Oklahoma City	3–1	Athens State	
1995; Details	Columbia, Missouri	Oklahoma City (2)	3–1	Puget Sound	
1996; Details	Decatur, Alabama Wilson Morgan Softball Complex	Oklahoma City (3)	9–1*	Shawnee State	
1997; Details	Decatur, Alabama Wilson Morgan Softball Complex	Oklahoma City (4)	12–0*	Athens State	
1998; Details	Tulsa, Oklahoma Broken Arrow Softball Complex	Western Washington	5–1	Simon Fraser	
1999; Details	Jupiter, Florida Jupiter Softball Park	Simon Fraser	7–3	Oklahoma City	
2000; Details	Decatur, Alabama Wilson Morgan Softball Complex	Oklahoma City (5)	5–1	Azusa Pacific	
2001; Details	Decatur, Alabama Wilson Morgan Softball Complex	Oklahoma City (6)	5–3	Simon Fraser	
2002; Details	Decatur, Alabama Wilson Morgan Softball Complex	Oklahoma City (7)	2–1 (8 innings)*	Point Loma Nazarene	
2003; Details	Decatur, Alabama Wilson Morgan Softball Complex	Simon Fraser (2)	3–1*	Mobile	
2004; Details	Decatur, Alabama Wilson Morgan Softball Complex	Thomas	5–4*	Simon Fraser	
2005; Details	Decatur, Alabama Wilson Morgan Softball Complex	Simon Fraser (3)	7–0	California Baptist	
2006; Details	Decatur, Alabama Wilson Morgan Softball Complex	Mobile	4–1	California Baptist	
2007; Details	Decatur, Alabama Wilson Morgan Softball Complex	Oklahoma City (8)	7–2	Point Loma Nazarene	
2008; Details	Decatur, Alabama Wilson Morgan Softball Complex	Lubbock Christian	2–1*	Mobile	
2009; Details	Decatur, Alabama Wilson Morgan Softball Complex	California Baptist	3–2	St. Gregory's	
2010; Details	Decatur, Alabama Wilson Morgan Softball Complex	Simon Fraser (4)	4–3	Oklahoma City	
2011; Details	Gulf Shores, Alabama Gulf Shores Sportsplex	Oregon Tech	1–0*	California Baptist	
2012; Details	Gulf Shores, Alabama Gulf Shores Sportsplex	Shorter	1–0	Oklahoma City	
2013; Details	Columbus, Georgia South Commons Softball Complex	Concordia Irvine	8–3	Spring Hill	
2014; Details	Columbus, Georgia South Commons Softball Complex	Auburn Montgomery	10–6*	William Carey	
2015; Details	Sioux City, Iowa Morningside College	Auburn Montgomery (2)	10–0 (6 innings)*	Lindsey Wilson	
2016; Details	Sioux City, Iowa Morningside College	Oklahoma City (9)	5–0*	Saint Xavier	
2017; Details	Clermont, Florida Legends Way Ball Fields	Oklahoma City (10)	4–1	Corban	
2018; Details	Clermont, Florida Legends Way Ball Fields	USAO	4–1	Columbia (MO)	
2019; Details	Springfield, Missouri Killian Sports Complex	Southern Oregon	8–3*	Oklahoma City	
2020; Details	No championship due to the coronavirus pandemic				
2021; Details	Columbus, Georgia South Commons Softball Complex	Southern Oregon (2)	3–2*	Oregon Tech	
2022; Details	Columbus, Georgia South Commons Softball Complex	Oklahoma City (11)	3–0	Mobile	
2023; Details	Columbus, Georgia South Commons Softball Complex	Southern Oregon (3)	11-0 (5 innings)	Oregon Tech	
2024; Details	Columbus, Georgia South Commons Softball Complex	Our Lady of the Lake	2–0	Jessup	Box score
2025; Details	Columbus, Georgia South Commons Softball Complex	Southern Oregon (4)	6–3*	Oklahoma City	Box score
2026; Details	Columbus, Georgia South Commons Softball Complex	Madonna (MI)	8-4	Southeastern (FL)	Box score

- * = Denotes that an "if necessary" game was played as a result of the double-elimination tournament format.

== Champions ==
=== Active NAIA programs ===
Team	Titles	Years
Oklahoma City	11	1994, 1995, 1996, 1997, 2000, 2001, 2002, 2007, 2016, 2017, 2022
Southern Oregon	4	2019, 2021, 2023, 2025
Madonna (MI)	1	2026
Our Lady of the Lake	1	2024
USAO	1	2018
Oregon Tech	1	2011
Mobile	1	2006
Thomas (GA)	1	2004

=== Former NAIA programs ===
Team	Titles	Years
Simon Fraser	4	1999, 2003, 2005, 2010
Auburn Montgomery	2	2014, 2015
Pacific Lutheran	2	1988, 1992
Nebraska–Kearney	2	1987, 1990
Emporia State	2	1983, 1984
Concordia Irvine	1	2013
Shorter	1	2012
California Baptist	1	2009
Lubbock Christian	1	2008
Western Washington	1	1998
West Florida	1	1993
Hawaii Loa	1	1991
Saginaw Valley	1	1989
St. Mary's (TX)	1	1986
Quincy	1	1985
Missouri Western	1	1982
Sam Houston State	1	1981

== See also ==
- NCAA Softball Championships (Division I, Division II, Division III)
- Women's College World Series
