= Jenae Leles =

American softball player

Personal information
- Full name: Amelia Jenae Leles
- Born: Amelia Jenae Leles; January 28, 1987 (age 39) Sacramento, California, U.S.
- Height: 5 ft 8 in (173 cm)
- Children: Jada Marie, currently pregnant
- Website: http://www.jenaeleles.com/

Sport
- Country: USA
- Sport: Softball
- College team: Arizona Wildcats
Medal record
Women's softball
Representing United States
Pan American Games
Gold medal – first place	2011 Guadalajara	Team

Amelia Jenae Leles (born January 28, 1990) is an American former collegiate All-American, softball third baseman. She attended Rio Americano High School and the University of Arizona, winning two titles with the Wildcats during her years playing from 2006 to 2009. With United States women's national softball team she won 2011 World Cup of Softball. Jenae was named to the 2012 Women's National Team. She was also drafted number 6 in the National Pro Fastpitch.

== Arizona ==
Leles, as a freshman, helped the Wildcats to a sixth NCAA title, including driving in the game-winning runs off Monica Abbott in the semifinals on June 4, 2006. She was shut out at the plate during the finale against the Northwestern Wildcats. As a sophomore, she made her second finals appearance and once again drove in the decisive runs against Abbott to capture a second championship in her career and the seventh for the school on June 6, 2007. She would be named All-Tournament for her efforts. In 2008, she would nab her first All-Pac-12 Conference honor. During her senior year, Leles earned National Fastpitch Coaches Association Second Team recognition and a second conference citation. On March 29, she hit her 50th career home run in a win over the Oregon Ducks. She made her final appearance on May 30, 2009, totaling two hits in a loss to the Alabama Crimson Tide on May 30.

== Personal ==
Jenae is currently living in Sacramento, Ca. She gives personal softball lessons and also runs Camps and Clinics locally and throughout the Nation.

== Statistics ==
Arizona Wildcats
YEAR	G	AB	R	H	BA	RBI	HR	3B	2B	TB	SLG	BB	SO	SB	SBA
2006	65	178	26	39	.219	35	7	1	8	70	.393%	29	45	0	0
2007	65	185	26	49	.265	45	10	0	12	91	.492%	33	32	2	2
2008	60	169	47	59	.349	49	17	2	14	128	.757%	29	22	6	6
2009	63	193	67	65	.337	64	23	0	11	145	.751%	41	36	1	1
TOTALS	253	725	166	212	.292	193	57	3	45	434	.598%	132	135	9	9
