= 2007 Tennessee Lady Volunteers softball team =

American college softball season

2007 Tennessee Lady Volunteers softball

SEC Regular Season Champions
- Conference: Southeastern Conference
- East
- Record: 63–8 (23–4 SEC)
- Head coach: Ralph Weekly; Karen Weekly
- Assistant coach: Marty McDaniel; Mark Weekly
- Home stadium: Tyson Park

2007 Southeastern Conference softball standings
	Conf.				Overall
Team	W		L	PCT	W		L	PCT
Eastern
No. 2 Tennessee ^{x}‍‍‍^{y}	23	–	4	.852	63	–	8	.887
No. 14 Florida ‍‍‍^{y}	17	–	11	.607	50	–	22	.694
Georgia ‍‍‍^{y}	13	–	15	.464	46	–	28	.622
No. 21 South Carolina ‍‍‍^{y}	12	–	26	.316	38	–	26	.594
Kentucky ‍‍‍	4	–	24	.143	20	–	31	.392
Western
No. 10 LSU ^{x}‍‍‡‍^{y}	22	–	6	.786	55	–	12	.821
No. 9 Alabama ‍‍‍^{y}	21	–	6	.778	55	–	10	.846
Mississippi State ‍‍‍^{y}	14	–	14	.500	35	–	27	.565
Ole Miss ‍‍‍	11	–	17	.393	24	–	34	.414
Auburn ‍‍‍	10	–	18	.357	26	–	30	.464
Arkansas ‍‍‍	6	–	22	.214	21	–	43	.328
x – Division champion ‡ – Tournament champion y – Invited to the NCAA Tournament; As of June 30, 2007; Rankings from NFCA/USA Today

The 2007 Tennessee Lady Volunteers softball team was an American college softball team, representing the University of Tennessee for the 2007 NCAA Division I softball season. The team played their home games at Tyson Park. The team made it to the 2007 Women's College World Series, finishing second for their best finish in school history.

== Roster ==
2007 Tennessee Lady Volunteers roster
Pitchers: 7 - Monica Abbott – Senior; 10 - Megan Rhodes – Junior; Outfielders: 00 - Nicole Kajitani – Freshman; 2 - Tiffany Baker – Freshman; 3 - Alexia Clay – Freshman; 5 - Danielle Pieroni – Sophomore; 14 - Erinn Webb – Freshman; 17 - Lillian Hammond – Sophomore; 18 - Anita Manuma – Freshman; 23 - India Chiles – Senior; 33 - Lindsay Schutzler – Senior; 52 - Tiffany Huff – Freshman	Catchers: 35 - Shannon Doepking – Junior; Infielders: 1 - Liane Horiuchi – Sophomore; 6 - Natalee Weissinger – Freshman; 8 - Kenora Posey – Junior; 9 - Caitlin Ryan – Junior; 12 - Allison Fulmer – Sophomore; 31 - Jennifer Griffin – Sophomore; 35 - Tonya Callahan – Junior

== Schedule ==
Date	Time	Opponent	Rank^{#}	Site	Result	Attendance	Winning Pitcher	Losing Pitcher
February 9*	3:00 PM	Coastal Carolina	#2	Upper Field • Chapel Hill, NC	W 8-0^{(5)}	-	M. Abbott	D. Gerdts
February 10*	10:30 AM	Penn State	#2	Eugene Stone Stadium • Chapel Hill, NC	W 9-1^{(5)}	-	M. Rhodes	A. Esparza
February 10*	3:00 PM	North Carolina	#2	Eugene Stone Stadium • Chapel Hill, NC	W 2-1^{(8)}	1,224	M. Abbott	L. Norris
February 11*	10:00 AM	College of Charleston	#2	Eugene Stone Stadium • Chapel Hill, NC	W 11-1^{(5)}	-	M. Abbott	S. Howard
Louisville Slugger Tournament
February 16*	12:00 PM	FIU	#1	SLC Field • Las Vegas, NV	W 8-0^{(5)}	176	M. Abbott	P. Eastman
February 17*	6:00 PM	Sacramento State	#1	SLC Field • Las Vegas, NV	W 9-2	214	M. Abbott	C. Cervantes
February 17*	9:00 PM	Illinois	#1	SLC Field • Las Vegas, NV	W 5-0	200	M. Abbott	C. DeVreese
February 18*	12:00 PM	Cal State Northridge	#1	SLC Field • Las Vegas, NV	W 9-0	184	M. Abbott	M. Lovato
February 19*	4:30 PM	UC Davis	#1	SLC Field • Las Vegas, NV	W 10-0^{(5)}	197	M. Rhodes	L. Tognetti
February 21*	9:00 PM	Cal State Fullerton	#1	Anderson Family Field • Fullerton, CA	W 8-0^{(5)}	635	M. Abbott	C. Baker
Palm Springs Classic
February 22*	5:00 PM	Loyola Marymount	#1	Big League Dreams • Palm Springs, CA	W 8-0^{(5)}	-	M. Abbott	T. Pagano
February 23*	4:00 PM	#22 Fresno State	#1	Big League Dreams • Palm Springs, CA	W 5-0	278	M. Abbott	R. Mackin
February 23*	11:30 PM	#12 UCLA	#1	Big League Dreams • Palm Springs, CA	W 6-1	405	M. Rhodes	A. Selden
February 24*	3:30 PM	Michigan State	#1	Big League Dreams • Palm Springs, CA	W 3-0	549	M. Abbott	M. Hair
February 24*	6:30 PM	Oklahoma State	#1	Big League Dreams • Palm Springs, CA	W 8-0^{(5)}	345	M. Rhodes	J. Hoppock
Frost Tournament
March 2*	10:00 AM	UIC	#1	Frost Stadium • Chattanooga, TN	W 2-0	-	M. Abbott	S. Clynes
March 2*	12:15 PM	Oakland	#1	Frost Stadium • Chattanooga, TN	W 7-0	-	M. Rhodes	J. Granger
March 3*	10:00 AM	Tennessee Tech	#1	Frost Stadium • Chattanooga, TN	W 4-0	778	M. Abbott	B. Bynum
March 3*	12:15 PM	Toledo	#1	Frost Stadium • Chattanooga, TN	W 9-1^{(6)}	524	M. Rhodes	S. Pereira
March 4*	9:00 AM	Austin Peay	#1	Frost Stadium • Chattanooga, TN	W 2-0	355	M. Abbott	M. Williams
March 6*	5:00 PM	Appalachian State	#1	Tyson Park • Knoxville, TN	W 1-0	411	M. Abbott	Y. Moose
March 6*	7:30 PM	Appalachian State	#1	Tyson Park • Knoxville, TN	W 7-1	411	M. Abbott	K. Richardson
March 10	1:00 PM	#19 Florida	#1	KSP Stadium • Gainesville, FL	W 1-0^{(10)}	1,464	M. Abbott	S. Nelson
March 10	3:30 PM	#19 Florida	#1	KSP Stadium • Gainesville, FL	L 0-4	1,464	S. Stevens	M. Rhodes
March 11	1:00 PM	#19 Florida	#1	KSP Stadium • Gainesville, FL	W 3-1	906	M. Abbott	S. Nelson
March 14	6:00 PM	Ole Miss	#1	Ole Miss Softball Complex • Oxford, MS	W 1-0	539	M. Abbott	T. Willitt
March 14	8:30 PM	Ole Miss	#1	Ole Miss Softball Complex • Oxford, MS	L 4-5	539	M. Callahan	M. Abbott
March 17	1:00 PM	Mississippi State	#1	Tyson Park • Knoxville, TN	W 3-0	898	M. Abbott	S. Comeaux
March 17	3:30 PM	Mississippi State	#1	Tyson Park • Knoxville, TN	W 2-1^{(8)}	898	M. Abbott	S. Hickerson
March 18	12:30 PM	Mississippi State	#1	Tyson Park • Knoxville, TN	W 5-1	363	M. Abbott	S. Comeaux
March 21	4:30 PM	South Carolina	#1	Tyson Park • Knoxville, TN	W 2-0	587	M. Abbott	M. Hendon
March 21	7:00 PM	South Carolina	#1	Tyson Park • Knoxville, TN	W 1-0	587	M. Rhodes	K. Pouliot
March 24	1:00 PM	Arkansas	#1	Tyson Park • Knoxville, TN	W 4-0	894	M. Abbott	M. Dixon
March 24	3:30 PM	Arkansas	#1	Tyson Park • Knoxville, TN	W 1-0	894	M. Abbott	K. Henry
March 25	1:00 PM	Arkansas	#1	Tyson Park • Knoxville, TN	W 5-0	537	M. Abbott	K. Henry
March 26*	5:00 PM	Liberty	#1	Tyson Park • Knoxville, TN	W 5-1	390	M. Abbott	T. Lowe
March 26*	7:30 PM	Liberty	#1	Tyson Park • Knoxville, TN	W 4-0	390	M. Abbott	S. Ellis
March 28*	5:00 PM	Western Kentucky	#1	Tyson Park • Knoxville, TN	W 6-0	491	M. Abbott	J. Kempf
March 28*	7:30 PM	Western Kentucky	#1	Tyson Park • Knoxville, TN	W 2-0	491	M. Abbott	R. Horesky
March 30*	5:00 PM	East Tennessee State	#1	Tyson Park • Knoxville, TN	W 13-3^{(5)}	791	M. Abbott	M. Hardy
March 30*	7:30 PM	East Tennessee State	#1	Tyson Park • Knoxville, TN	W 8-0^{(5)}	791	M. Rhodes	A. Haverman
April 3*	5:00 PM	Tennessee Tech	#1	Tyson Park • Knoxville, TN	W 12-0^{(5)}	346	M. Rhodes	S. Street
April 7	2:00 PM	Georgia	#1	Jack Turner Stadium • Athens, GA	W 10-0^{(5)}	1,563	M. Abbott	C. Hamilton
April 7	4:30 PM	Georgia	#1	Jack Turner Stadium • Athens, GA	W 3-1	1,564	M. Rhodes	K. Carroll
April 8	1:30 PM	Georgia	#1	Jack Turner Stadium • Athens, GA	W 5-1	761	M. Abbott	C. Hamilton
April 10*	1:30 PM	Memphis	#1	Tyson Park • Knoxville, TN	W 4-1	378	M. Abbott	N. Johnson
April 11*	4:00 PM	Bowling Green	#1	Tyson Park • Knoxville, TN	Canceled	-	-	-
April 11*	6:30 PM	Bowling Green	#1	Tyson Park • Knoxville, TN	Canceled	-	-	-
April 14	6:00 PM	Kentucky	#1	UK Softball Complex • Lexington, KY	W 12-0	307	M. Abbott	A. Matousek
April 15	1:00 PM	Kentucky	#1	UK Softball Complex • Lexington, KY	W 8-2	293	M. Abbott	J. Young
April 15	3:30 PM	Kentucky	#1	UK Softball Complex • Lexington, KY	W 9-4	293	M. Abbott	M. Jolly
April 17*	5:30 PM	Radford	#1	Whitetop Creek Park • Bristol, TN	Canceled	-	-	-
April 21	1:00 PM	Auburn	#1	Tyson Park • Knoxville, TN	W 10-0^{(5)}	1,483	M. Rhodes	B. Day
April 21	3:30 PM	Auburn	#1	Tyson Park • Knoxville, TN	W 2-1^{(8)}	1,483	M. Abbott	A. Thompson
April 22	2:00 PM	Auburn	#1	Tyson Park • Knoxville, TN	W 5-1	1,003	M. Abbott	A. Thompson
April 28	4:00 PM	#5 LSU	#1	Tiger Park • Baton Rouge, LA	W 2-1	2,326	M. Abbott	D. Hofer
April 28	6:30 PM	#5 LSU	#1	Tiger Park • Baton Rouge, LA	L 1-5	2,326	E. Turner	M. Rhodes
April 29	2:00 PM	#5 LSU	#1	Tiger Park • Baton Rouge, LA	L 2-3	1,531	E. Turner	M. Abbott
May 5	6:00 PM	#1 Alabama	#2	Tyson Park • Knoxville, TN	Canceled	-	-	-
May 6	1:00 PM	#1 Alabama	#2	Tyson Park • Knoxville, TN	W 9-2	1,836	M. Abbott	C. Owens
May 6	3:30 PM	#1 Alabama	#2	Tyson Park • Knoxville, TN	W 4-0	1,836	M. Abbott	B. Potter
SEC Tournament
May 10	8:30 PM	Ole Miss	#1	Jane B. Moore Field • Auburn, AL	W 6-0	731	M. Abbott	T. Willitt
May 11	8:30 PM	#19 Florida	#1	Jane B. Moore Field • Auburn, AL	L 0-1	1,032	S. Nelson	M. Abbott
NCAA Knoxville Regional
May 18	5:00 PM	Furman	#5	Tyson Park • Knoxville, TN	W 8-0^{(6)}	684	M. Abbott	B. Murray
May 19	1:30 PM	North Carolina	#5	Tyson Park • Knoxville, TN	W 2-0	-	M. Abbott	D. Spaulding
May 20	2:00 PM	Winthrop	#5	Tyson Park • Knoxville, TN	W 7-0	628	M. Abbott	C. Woolridge
NCAA Knoxville Super Regional
May 25	8:00 PM	#17 Hawaii	#5	Tyson Park • Knoxville, TN	W 9-0^{(5)}	1,104	M. Abbott	J. Smethurst
May 26	4:00 PM	#17 Hawaii	#5	Tyson Park • Knoxville, TN	L 6-9	1,127	K. Robinson	M. Rhodes
May 26	6:30 PM	#17 Hawaii	#5	Tyson Park • Knoxville, TN	W 7-1	1,127	M. Abbott	C. Baughman
NCAA Women's College World Series
May 31	7:00 PM	#4 Texas A&M	#5	ASA Hall of Fame Stadium • Oklahoma City, OK	W 2-0	-	M. Abbott	A. Scarborough
June 1	9:30 PM	#1 Arizona	#5	ASA Hall of Fame Stadium • Oklahoma City, OK	W 0-1	7,744	M. Abbott	T. Mowatt
June 3	3:00 PM	#2 Northwestern	#5	ASA Hall of Fame Stadium • Oklahoma City, OK	W 3-0	6,949	M. Abbott	E. Canney
June 4	8:00 PM	#1 Arizona	#5	ASA Hall of Fame Stadium • Oklahoma City, OK	W 3-0	5,231	M. Abbott	T. Mowatt
June 5	8:00 PM	#1 Arizona	#5	ASA Hall of Fame Stadium • Oklahoma City, OK	L 0-1^{(10)}	5,301	T. Mowatt	M. Abbott
June 6	8:00 PM	#1 Arizona	#5	ASA Hall of Fame Stadium • Oklahoma City, OK	L 0-5	5,533	T. Mowatt	M. Abbott
*Non-Conference Game. ^{#}Rankings from NFCA released prior to game.All times are in Eastern Time Zone.

== Ranking movements ==
Ranking movements Legend: ██ Increase in ranking ██ Decrease in ranking
	Week														
Poll	Pre	1	2	3	4	5	6	7	8	9	10	11	12	13	Final
NFCA/USA Today	2	1	1	1	1	1	1	1	1	1	1	1	2	1	2
