= Association for Intercollegiate Athletics for Women =

US women's college sports association

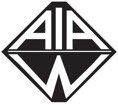
- Abbreviation: AIAW
- Formation: 1971
- Dissolved: 1983; 43 years ago
- Type: Association
- Location: US
- Region served: United States

The Association for Intercollegiate Athletics for Women (AIAW) was a college athletics organization in the United States, founded in 1971 to govern women's college competitions in the country and to administer national championships (see Association for Intercollegiate Athletics for Women championships). It evolved out of the "Commission on Intercollegiate Athletics for Women" (CIAW), founded in 1967. The association was one of the biggest advancements for women's athletics on the collegiate level. Throughout the 1970s, the AIAW grew rapidly in membership and influence, in parallel with the national growth of women's sports following the enactment of Title IX.

The AIAW functioned in the equivalent role for college women's programs that the National Collegiate Athletic Association (NCAA) had been doing for men's programs. Owing to its own success, the AIAW was in a vulnerable position that precipitated conflicts with the NCAA in the early 1980s. Following a one-year overlap in which both organizations staged women's championships, the AIAW discontinued operation, and most member schools continued their women's athletics programs under the governance of the NCAA.

== History ==
Women's intercollegiate athletics were organized on a national basis in 1941, the year the first national collegiate championship was held in the sport of golf by the "Division for Girls' and Women's Sports" (DGWS) of the American Association for Health, Physical Education and Recreation. (Note: In the U.S. there were earlier organizations formed in the 1920s for women's intercollegiate competition in track and field and fencing. In England, the Women's Inter-Varsity Athletics Board (WIVAB) was formed to govern inter-varsity track and field competition for women in 1923.) During the late 1950s and the 1960s, many colleges around the country had started women's sports teams that competed with other schools in their respective geographic areas. In 1956 the Tripartite Committee was formed by representatives of three organizations: the National Association for Physical Education for College Women, the National Association for Girls' and Women's Sport, and the American Federation of College Women.

Upon the recommendation of the Tripartite Committee, the National Joint Committee on Extramural Sports for College Women (NJCESCW) was formed in 1957 to guide and administer women's intercollegiate athletic programs. In 1965, with the desire to consolidate governance of women's intercollegiate athletics under one organization, the NJCESCW disbanded and agreed to let the DGWS assume control over competition and extramural events.

The first action the DGWS took was to establish the Commission on Intercollegiate Athletics for Women (CIAW) to assume responsibility for designing, sponsoring, and sanctioning women’s intercollegiate sports and championships. The purposes of the CIAW were (1) to provide the framework and organization for women's intercollegiate athletic opportunities and (2) to sponsor national championships for college women under the authority of the DGWS.

The AIAW developed from the CIAW in recognition of the need for institutional membership and elected representation. Formation of the AIAW was approved by the DGWS Council and the AAHPER Board of Directors in 1971, but the CIAW continued to operate until early 1972, at which time the AIAW officially came into existence, with over 280 schools as members.

At that time the National Collegiate Athletic Association (NCAA) had no interest in women's athletics, and administrators of the AIAW had no interest in the NCAA either. The NCAA was seen as being commercially driven and neglecting the meaning of the student-athlete. There were distinct differences between the two associations in the AIAW's early years. For example, student-athletes playing in AIAW programs were allowed to transfer freely between schools, and to prevent unfair advantages, programs were initially forbidden to offer scholarships and recruit off-campus. The AIAW continued the rules established by the CIAW, which were intended to prohibit unethical practices that were observed in men's sports. To enforce the rules, students receiving scholarships were forbidden from championship participation. The ban on scholarships ended in 1973, following a lawsuit by players and coaches from two colleges in Florida. The AIAW was not without criticism however, as some outsiders and individual members complained that the association devoted too much time, efforts, and funds securing distinction and independence from the NCAA.

The annual softball tournaments and basketball tournaments received the most publicity and drew the biggest crowds; however, the association organized championships in various other sports. They included mainstream sports like volleyball and tennis but were as far reaching as badminton and fencing. Aside from national championships, individual schools worked together to stage annual state championships.

While in existence, the AIAW organized and administered all competition at the regional and national levels. In 1981-82 the organization offered 41 national championships in 19 sports — badminton, basketball, cross country, fencing, field hockey, golf, gymnastics, indoor track and field, lacrosse, rowing, skiing, soccer, softball (fast and slow pitch), swimming and diving, synchronized swimming, tennis, track and field, and volleyball.

The 1973 Basketball Tournament was the first sign that women's sports could be financially successful. Over 3,000 fans watched the final game between Queens and Immaculata, and the tournament earned over $4,500 in profits. In 1975 these two teams met again, this time in Madison Square Garden. The first women's basketball game to be played in the arena drew a crowd of more than 12,000 spectators. The AIAW started to take advantage of corporate sponsorships and television payouts not unlike its male counterpart, but on a smaller scale.

In 1972, the United States Congress passed Title IX of the Educational Amendments of 1972. Although the impact today is primarily discussed in terms of the impact on athletics, the bill made no explicit mention of athletics. The bill provided that neither men nor women could "be excluded from participation in, be denied the benefits of, or be subjected to discrimination under any education program or activity receiving Federal financial assistance". The task of issuing regulations fell to the Department of Health, Education and Welfare (HEW). One of its early decisions was that athletic programs would indeed be subject to the requirements of the law. The effect was to require the creation of new women's teams instead of stipulating that women could simply try out for men's teams. Consequently, the regulations required colleges to provide equal opportunities for both genders in collegiate athletics. Any school that received federal funds was required to provide gender equality by the 1978-79 school year. In 1974 colleges started giving scholarships to female student-athletes. That year (aside from the exceptional Wayland College basketball team in the 1950s), Ann Meyers became the first female to receive a full scholarship by committing to play for UCLA. Title IX is credited with the vast improvement in funding for women's athletics. By 1980, the average university spent over 16% of its athletics budget on women's sports. In the early 1970s that number was less than 1%.

Although the regulations promulgated under the law required additional funding for women's teams, athletic directors did not immediately embrace the requirements. Their concerns included the relative inability for many schools to sufficiently fund the necessary women's teams, making it possible for the budgets for men's teams to be reduced to achieve compliance. The NCAA, which regulated men's intercollegiate sports, raised money to help fight Title IX. In 1974 the Senate passed the Tower Amendment, which decreed that Title IX did not cover football or other revenue-producing sports. The recently formed AIAW responded, hiring a lawyer, Margot Polivy, to fight the Tower Amendment. Their efforts were successful, as a joint Congressional conference committee decided to eliminate the Tower Amendment.

On June 1, 1979, the AIAW assumed a separate legal identity and became a nonprofit corporation in the District of Columbia. Then in 1981, following the NCAA's decision to offer championships for women in its top competitive division, Division I, the AIAW suffered substantial losses of members and revenue.

=== AIAW vs. NCAA ===
At its peak, the AIAW had almost 1,000 member schools. In the late 1970s, however, schools began to realize that women's athletics could be profitable, and the NCAA decided to offer women's championships. The NCAA's Divisions II and III voted to offer championships in 1980; however, Division I members failed to gain a majority vote on this issue until the 1981 national meeting. This decision was quite contentious. During the tense floor debate, AIAW representatives objected to the motion to sponsor Division I championships, but their objections were met with pockets of "ridicule and hissing". After considerable debate, a vote was called, and the initial result was a tie, 124–124. A recount of the votes revealed the defeat of the motion by a vote of 128–127. However, parliamentary rules permit "reconsideration" of a vote if someone on the prevailing side asks for it. Several delegates on the losing side knew of one institution that had voted against the motion but whose faculty representative favored the NCAA position. When the influencer of the school’s "nay" vote left the room, those delegates prevailed upon that representative to request reconsideration. This time it passed, 137–117.

For the 1981-82 academic year, schools were able to compete in either the NCAA or the AIAW championships. There were a few occasions when a school participated in both tournaments that year (Florida in gymnastics, 1982; Oklahoma State in softball, 1982; indeed the University of Tulsa won both the AIAW and NCAA women's golf championships in 1982). However, the battle of members had started, as schools whose men's teams were already participating in the NCAA started to integrate their women's teams. Although some schools permitted their individual women's teams to choose, most schools made the weighty decision to support only one of the two organizations. The AIAW had fought for women's rights in the Title IX battle, while the NCAA had opposed those efforts. In contrast, the NCAA was much better funded and had better access to television contracts. The University of Texas, where the last AIAW president, Donna Lopiano, was the women's athletics director, was one of the stronger holdouts. But when 17 of the top 20 basketball teams agreed to enter the NCAA tournament, it proved to be the end for the AIAW.

In 1982 the first NCAA Division I women's basketball tournament was held. The NCAA was able to offer incentives, such as payment of transportation costs, to participating members, something the AIAW was not able to do. When former AIAW powerhouses like Tennessee, Louisiana Tech, and Old Dominion decided to participate in the NCAA tournament, the AIAW tournament lost much of its appeal and popularity.

NBC canceled its TV contract with the association, and in mid-1982 the AIAW stopped operations in all sports. Following the last AIAW sanctioned event in 1982, the AIAW pursued a federal antitrust suit against the NCAA. But one year later, after the presiding judge ruled against the organization, the AIAW ceased existence on June 30, 1983.

Under NCAA governance, scholarships increased. However, several problems the NCAA was facing, then and now, began to also affect women's intercollegiate athletics. Examples of these include recruiting irregularities and increased turnover in coaching positions for revenue-producing sports.

Several AIAW championships were televised by the TVS Television Network in 1979.

== Championships ==
Date spans indicate entire sports years (fall through spring), not that a title was contested in both the first and last calendar years of the span.

- Badminton (1969–1982)
- Basketball (1968–1982)
- Cross country (1975–1982)
- Fencing (1979–1982)
- Field hockey (1975–1982)
- Golf (1969–1982)
- Gymnastics (1968–1982)
- Lacrosse (1980–1982)
- Rowing (1981–1982)
- Skiing (1976–1982)
- Soccer (1981–1982)
- Softball, fast pitch (1968–1982)
- Softball, slow pitch (1980–1982)
- Swimming and diving (1967–1982)
- Synchronized swimming (1976–1982)
- Tennis (1976–1982)
- Track and field, indoor (1979–1982)
- Track and field, outdoor (1968–1982)
- Volleyball (1969–1982)

== See also ==
- List of NCAA schools with the most AIAW Division I national championships
- Major women's sport leagues in North America

== Sources ==
- Festle, Mary Jo (April 15, 1996). Playing Nice. Columbia University Press. ISBN 978-0-231-10162-2.
- Grundy, Pamela; Shackelford, Susan (2005). Shattering the Glass. The New Press. ISBN 1-56584-822-5.
- Lannin, Joanne (2000). A History of Basketball for Girls and Women. Lerner Publications. ISBN 978-0-8225-9863-3.
- Hult, Joan S.; Trekell, Marianna (1991). A Century of women's basketball: From Frailty to Final Four. Reston, Va: National Association for Girls and Women in Sport. ISBN 9780883144909.
- Hunt, Virginia (1976). "Governance of Women's Intercollegiate Athletics: an Historical Perspective". Doctoral Dissertation, University of North Carolina - Greensboro. Ann Arbor, Michigan: University Microfilms (1977), 1-319.
- Su, Mila Chin Ying (May 2002). "Collegiate Women's Sports And A Guide To Collecting And Identifying Archival Materials" (PDF). The Pennsylvania State University.
- Willey, Suzanne (1996). "The Governance of Women's Intercollegiate Athletics: Association for Intercollegiate Athletics for Women (AIAW), 1976-1982". Thesis (P.E.D.), Indiana University. Eugene, Oregon: Microform Publications (1997), 1-351.
- Association for Intercollegiate Athletics for Women (AIAW), Southern Region II Records, 1969-1983 Compiled by Nell Hensley & Neil Kasiak, Eastern Kentucky University
