= 2016 NCAA Division I softball season =

American college softball season

- Defending Champions: Florida

Tournament

Women's College World Series
- Champions: Oklahoma (3rd title)
- Runners-up: Auburn (2nd WCWS Appearance)
- Winning Coach: Patty Gasso (3rd title)
- WCWS MOP: Paige Parker (Oklahoma)

Seasons
- ← 2015 2017 →

The 2016 NCAA Division I softball season, play of college softball in the United States organized by the National Collegiate Athletic Association (NCAA) at the Division I level, began in February 2016. The season progressed through the regular season, many conference tournaments and championship series, and concluded with the 2016 NCAA Division I softball tournament and 2016 Women's College World Series. The Women's College World Series, consisting of the eight remaining teams in the NCAA Tournament and held annually in Oklahoma City at ASA Hall of Fame Stadium, ended in June 2016.

== Conference standings ==
2016 American Athletic Conference softball standings
	Conf.				Overall
Team	W		L	PCT	W		L	PCT
No. 25 South Florida ‍†‍‍^{y}	15	–	3	.833	45	–	16	.738
UCF ‍‍‍^{y}	12	–	4	.750	38	–	22	.633
Tulsa ‍‍‡‍^{y}	9	–	9	.500	35	–	21	.625
Houston ‍‍‍	9	–	9	.500	27	–	29	.482
Memphis ‍‍‍	7	–	11	.389	26	–	31	.456
East Carolina ‍‍‍	5	–	13	.278	23	–	31	.426
UConn ‍‍‍	4	–	12	.250	19	–	33	.365
† – Conference champion ‡ – Tournament champion y – Invited to the NCAA tournament As of May 23, 2016; Rankings from Today/NFCA Coaches

2016 Big 12 Conference softball standings
	Conf.				Overall
Team	W		L	PCT	W		L	PCT
No. 1 Oklahoma ‍†‍‍^{y}	17	–	1	.944	57	–	8	.877
No. 21 Baylor ‍‍‍^{y}	13	–	4	.765	45	–	14	.763
Texas ‍‍‍^{y}	10	–	7	.588	38	–	16	.704
Kansas ‍‍‍	8	–	9	.471	31	–	20	.608
Oklahoma State ‍‍‍^{y}	6	–	11	.353	32	–	26	.552
Texas Tech ‍‍‍	6	–	12	.333	23	–	32	.418
Iowa State ‍‍‍	1	–	17	.056	20	–	35	.364
† – Conference champion y – Invited to the NCAA tournament Rankings from NFCA

2016 Big East Conference softball standings
	Conf.				Overall
Team	W		L	PCT	W		L	PCT
DePaul ‍†‍‍	16	–	3	.842	27	–	25	.519
Villanova ‍‍‍	14	–	6	.700	32	–	18	.640
St. John's ‍‍‍	12	–	7	.632	29	–	20	.592
Butler ‍‍‡‍^{y}	9	–	7	.563	28	–	24	.538
Creighton ‍‍‍	7	–	11	.389	25	–	22	.532
Seton Hall ‍‍‍	7	–	12	.368	24	–	30	.444
Providence ‍‍‍	6	–	14	.300	21	–	28	.429
Georgetown ‍‍‍	3	–	14	.176	9	–	35	.205
† – Conference champion ‡ – Tournament champion y – Invited to the NCAA tournament As of June 30, 2016; Rankings from NFCA

2016 Big Ten Conference softball standings
	Conf.				Overall
Team	W		L	PCT	W		L	PCT
No. 5 Michigan ‍†‍‍^{y}	21	–	2	.913	52	–	7	.881
No. 20 Minnesota ‍‍‡‍^{y}	19	–	3	.864	43	–	14	.754
Northwestern ‍‍‍^{y}	15	–	8	.652	27	–	28	.491
Penn State ‍‍‍	14	–	9	.609	30	–	24	.556
Nebraska ‍‍‍^{y}	13	–	9	.591	35	–	21	.625
Ohio State ‍‍‍^{y}	13	–	9	.591	34	–	20	.630
Illinois ‍‍‍^{y}	12	–	11	.522	36	–	23	.610
Wisconsin ‍‍‍	11	–	11	.500	28	–	24	.538
Indiana ‍‍‍	10	–	13	.435	29	–	25	.537
Michigan State ‍‍‍	8	–	15	.348	27	–	28	.491
Purdue ‍‍‍	8	–	15	.348	27	–	28	.491
Rutgers ‍‍‍	8	–	15	.348	24	–	33	.421
Maryland ‍‍‍	4	–	19	.174	12	–	40	.231
Iowa ‍‍‍	3	–	20	.130	13	–	39	.250
† – Conference champion ‡ – Tournament champion y – Invited to the NCAA tournament As of June 6, 2016; Rankings from NFCA

2016 Colonial Athletic Association softball standings
	Conf.						Overall
Team	W		L		T	PCT	W		L		T	PCT
#8 James Madison ‍†‍‡‍^{y}	18	–	1	–	0	.947	50	–	6	–	0	.893
Towson ‍‍‍	11	–	8	–	0	.579	37	–	17	–	0	.685
College of Charleston ‍‍‍	11	–	9	–	0	.550	35	–	23	–	0	.603
Elon ‍‍‍	9	–	8	–	0	.529	26	–	25	–	0	.510
Delaware ‍‍‍	9	–	9	–	0	.500	30	–	21	–	0	.588
UNC Wilmington ‍‍‍	8	–	10	–	0	.444	29	–	21	–	0	.580
Hofstra ‍‍‍	8	–	10	–	0	.444	24	–	22	–	0	.522
Drexel ‍‍‍	0	–	19	–	0	.000	20	–	35	–	0	.364
† – Conference champion ‡ – Tournament champion As of May 24, 2016; Rankings from USA Today/NFCA Coaches

2016 Ohio Valley Conference softball standings
	Conf.				Overall
Team	W		L	PCT	W		L	PCT
Jacksonville State ‡ ‍‍‍	26	–	0	1.000	43	–	17	.717
Eastern Kentucky ‍‍‍	17	–	8	.680	37	–	17	.685
Eastern Illinois ‍‍‍	17	–	8	.680	25	–	28	.472
SIU Edwardsville ‍‍‍	15	–	11	.577	28	–	26	.519
Tennessee–Martin ‍‍‍	14	–	13	.519	30	–	26	.536
Tennessee Tech ‍‍‍	14	–	13	.519	23	–	33	.411
Morehead State ‍‍‍	11	–	11	.500	26	–	27	.491
Murray State ‍‍‍	12	–	14	.462	14	–	31	.311
Belmont ‍‍‍	11	–	16	.407	19	–	35	.352
SE Missouri State ‍‍‍	10	–	17	.370	16	–	33	.327
Austin Peay ‍‍‍	5	–	22	.185	9	–	387	.023
Tennessee State ‍‍‍	3	–	22	.120	10	–	45	.182
‡ – OVC Tournament champion As of May 9, 2016; Rankings from USA Today/NFCA Coaches

2016 Pac-12 Conference softball standings
	Conf.						Overall
Team	W		L		T	PCT	W		L		T	PCT
No. 10 Oregon ‍†‍‍^{y}	20	–	4	–	0	.833	48	–	10	–	0	.828
No. 9 UCLA ‍‍‍	16	–	5	–	1	.750	40	–	16	–	1	.711
No. 13 Washington ‍‍‍	16	–	8	–	0	.667	39	–	15	–	0	.722
No. 16 Utah ‍‍‍	13	–	10	–	0	.565	35	–	22	–	0	.614
No. 14 Arizona ‍‍‍	13	–	11	–	0	.542	40	–	21	–	0	.656
California ‍‍‍	11	–	11	–	1	.500	33	–	24	–	1	.578
Oregon State ‍‍‍	9	–	14	–	0	.391	30	–	20	–	1	.598
Arizona State ‍‍‍	6	–	17	–	0	.261	32	–	26	–	0	.552
Stanford ‍‍‍	0	–	24	–	0	.000	13	–	35	–	0	.271
† – Conference champion y – Invited to the NCAA tournament As of June 30, 2016; Rankings from NFCA/USA Today

2016 Southeastern Conference softball standings
	Conf.				Overall
Team	W		L	PCT	W		L	PCT
No. 1 Florida ‍‍‍	20	–	4	.833	52	–	4	.929
No. 12 Kentucky ‍‍‍	17	–	7	.708	43	–	11	.796
No. 10 Tennessee ‍‍‍	16	–	7	.696	40	–	13	.755
No. 6 Auburn ‍‍‡‍	16	–	7	.696	46	–	9	.836
No. 4 Alabama ‍‍‍	16	–	8	.667	45	–	11	.804
No. 16 Missouri ‍‍‍	14	–	10	.583	39	–	13	.750
No. 13 LSU ‍‍‍	13	–	11	.542	42	–	14	.750
No. 15 Georgia ‍‍‍	12	–	12	.500	40	–	16	.714
Ole Miss ‍‍‍	11	–	13	.458	38	–	19	.667
No. 17 Texas A&M ‍‍‍	9	–	15	.375	37	–	17	.685
South Carolina ‍‍‍	7	–	17	.292	35	–	20	.636
Mississippi State ‍‍‍	3	–	21	.125	25	–	30	.455
Arkansas ‍‍‍	1	–	23	.042	17	–	39	.304
‡ – Tournament champion As of May 8, 2016; Rankings from NFCA

2016 Southland Conference softball standings
	Conf.				Overall
Team	W		L	PCT	W		L	PCT
East Division
McNeese State ** ^{x}‍‍‡‍^{y}	23	–	4	.852	42	–	12	.778
Nicholls ‍‍‍	21	–	5	.808	39	–	17	.696
Lamar ‍‍‍	18	–	9	.667	35	–	22	.614
Central Arkansas ‍‍‍	16	–	11	.593	35	–	22	.614
Northwestern State ‍‍‍	10	–	17	.370	27	–	25	.519
Southeastern Louisiana ‍‍‍	6	–	21	.222	23	–	32	.418
West Division
Abilene Christian * ^{x}‍‍‍	19	–	8	.704	26	–	21	.553
Stephen F. Austin ‍‍‍	13	–	13	.500	28	–	29	.491
Sam Houston ‍‍‍	13	–	14	.481	21	–	33	.389
Texas A&M–Corpus Christi ‍‍‍	7	–	19	.269	18	–	30	.375
Houston Baptist ‍‍‍	7	–	19	.269	15	–	29	.341
Incarnate Word * ‍‍‍	7	–	20	.259	18	–	34	.346
‡ – SLC Tournament Champion *ineligible for postseason play due to Div. I transition **Southland Tournament #1 seed champion As of May 13, 2016; Rankings from USA Today/NFCA Coaches

2016 Sun Belt Conference softball standings
	Conf.				Overall
Team	W		L	PCT	W		L	PCT
No. 12 Louisiana–Lafayette ‍†‍‡‍^{y}	21	–	2	.913	46	–	9	.836
South Alabama ‍‍‍	17	–	6	.739	33	–	18	.647
Texas State ‍‍‍^{y}	15	–	9	.625	40	–	22	.645
Georgia State ‍‍‍	13	–	11	.542	33	–	28	.541
Georgia Southern ‍‍‍	13	–	11	.542	30	–	27	.526
Troy ‍‍‍	11	–	13	.458	31	–	25	.554
UT Arlington ‍‍‍	8	–	16	.333	29	–	20	.592
Louisiana–Monroe ‍‍‍	7	–	17	.292	24	–	34	.414
Appalachian State ‍‍‍	2	–	22	.083	11	–	45	.196
‡ – Tournament champion As of March 18, 2019; Rankings from NFCA

2016 West Coast Conference softball standings
	Conf.						Overall
Team	W		L		T	PCT	W		L		T	PCT
BYU ‍†‍‍^{y}	11	–	2	–	0	.846	36	–	20	–	0	.643
Loyola Marymount ‍‍‍	10	–	5	–	0	.667	32	–	21	–	0	.604
San Diego ‍‍‍	7	–	6	–	0	.538	21	–	28	–	0	.429
Saint Mary's ‍‍‍	6	–	7	–	0	.462	19	–	26	–	1	.424
Santa Clara ‍‍‍	4	–	9	–	0	.308	9	–	40	–	0	.184
Pacific ‍‍‍	3	–	12	–	0	.200	20	–	28	–	0	.417
† – Conference champion y – Invited to the NCAA tournament As of June 17, 2016; Rankings from USA Today/NFCA Coaches

== Women's College World Series ==
The 2016 Women's College World Series began on June 2–8 in Oklahoma City.

First round
16	Georgia	5
8	Florida State	4
4	Auburn	10
12	UCLA	3
8	Florida State	8
12	UCLA	4
3	Oklahoma	3^{(8)}
6	Alabama	0
2	Michigan	2
10	LSU	0
6	Alabama	4
10	LSU	6

Second round
16	Georgia	3
4	Auburn	4
2	Michigan	0
8	Florida State	1
3	Oklahoma	7
2	Michigan	5
16	Georgia	1
10	LSU	4

Semifinals
4	Auburn	8^{(8)}	—
8	Florida State	7	—
3	Oklahoma	7	—
10	LSU	3	—

Finals
4	Auburn	2	11^{(8)}	1
3	Oklahoma	3	7	2

== Season leaders ==
Batting

- Batting average: .504 – Danielle Smith, Coppin State Eagles
- RBIs: 87 – Tina Iosefa, Georgia Bulldogs
- Home runs: 23 – Tina Iosefa, Georgia Bulldogs & Morgan Noad, Coastal Carolina Chanticleers

Pitching

- Wins: 38-3 – Paige Parker, Oklahoma Sooners
- ERA: 0.76 (24 ER/221.0 IP) – Kylee Hanson, Florida Atlantic Owls
- Strikeouts: 336 – Savannah Jo Dorsey, Ohio Bobcats & Sara Groenewegen, Minnesota Golden Gophers

== Records ==
NCAA Division I single game intentional walks: 5 – Darian Tautalafua, Long Beach State 49ers; May 8, 2016

NCAA Division I single game total bases: 17 – Carli Kayler, Troy Trojans; March 19, 2016

Freshman class hits: 104 – Tatyana Forbes, Coastal Carolina Chanticleers

== Awards ==
- USA Softball Collegiate Player of the Year:

Sierra Romero, Michigan Wolverines

- NFCA National Player of the Year:

Sierra Romero, Michigan Wolverines

- Honda Sports Award Softball:

Sierra Romero, Michigan Wolverines

YEAR	G	AB	R	H	BA	RBI	HR	3B	2B	TB	SLG	BB	SO	SB	SBA
2016	59	162	76	73	.450	79	19	1	11	143	.882%	52	12	15	17

- espnW National Player of the Year:

Kasey Cooper, Auburn Tigers

YEAR	G	AB	R	H	BA	RBI	HR	3B	2B	TB	SLG	BB	SO	SB	SBA
2016	70	187	69	79	.422	83	21	1	19	163	.871%	71	15	6	7

- NFCA National Freshman of the Year:

Amanda Lorenz, Florida Gators

YEAR	G	AB	R	H	BA	RBI	HR	3B	2B	TB	SLG	BB	SO	SB	SBA
2016	63	181	56	73	.403	48	8	1	14	113	.624%	48	19	10	12

- NFCA Catcher of the Year:

Lexie Elkins, Louisiana

- NFCA Golden Shoe Award:

Katie Lacour, Southeastern Louisiana

== All America Teams ==
The following players were members of the All-American Teams.

First Team

Position	Player	Class	School
P	Delanie Gourley	JR.	Florida Gators
P	Paige Parker	SO.	Oklahoma Sooners
P	Megan Good	SO.	James Madison Dukes
C	Lexie Elkins	SR.	ULL Ragin' Cajuns
1B	Tera Blanco	SO.	Michigan Wolverines
2B	Sierra Romero	SR.	Michigan Wolverines
3B	Kasey Cooper	JR.	Auburn Tigers
SS	Kristen Brown	SR.	North Carolina Tar Heels
OF	Haylie McCleney	SR.	Alabama Crimson Tide
OF	Emily Crane	SR.	Missouri Tigers
OF	Koral Costa	SR.	Oregon Ducks
UT	Jailyn Ford	SR.	James Madison Dukes
UT	Kimberlee Souza	SR.	Washington Huskies
AT-L	Sierra Lawrence	SR.	Michigan Wolverines
AT-L	Aleshia Ocasio	SO.	Florida Gators
AT-L	Sara Groenewegen	JR.	Minnesota Golden Gophers
AT-L	Kelsey Nunley	SR.	Kentucky Wildcats
AT-L	Marjani Knighten	JR.	Nebraska Cornhuskers

Second Team

Position	Player	Class	School
P	Kylee Hanson	JR.	FAU Owls
P	Megan Betsa	JR.	Michigan Wolverines
P	Alex Stewart	JR.	ULL Ragin' Cajuns
C	Erika Piancastelli	SO.	McNeese State Cowgirls
1B	Alex Powers	JR.	FSU Seminoles
2B	Emily Carosone	SR.	Auburn Tigers
3B	Mysha Sataraka	SR.	UCLA Bruins
SS	Delaney Spaulding	JR.	UCLA Bruins
OF	Aleah Craighton	SO.	ULL Ragin' Cajuns
OF	Erin Miller	SR.	Oklahoma Sooners
OF	Lindsey Stephens	SR.	Texas Longhorns
UT	Erica Nunn	SR.	USF Bulls
UT	Kayli Kvistad	SO.	Florida Gators
AT-L	Sydney Littlejohn	JR.	Alabama Crimson Tide
AT-L	Nikki Udria	JR.	Oregon Ducks
AT-L	Shay Knighten	FR.	Oklahoma Sooners
AT-L	Leona Lafaele	SR.	Alabama Crimson Tide
AT-L	Ali Aguilar	JR.	Washington Huskies

Third Team

Position	Player	Class	School
P	Cheridan Hawkins	SR.	Oregon Ducks
P	Jessica Burroughs	JR.	FSU Seminoles
P	Nisa Ontiveros	SR.	California Golden Bears
C	Emily Naegele	SR.	Northern Illinois Huskies
1B	Jade Rhodes	SR.	Auburn Tigers
2B	Hannah Flippen	JR.	Utah Utes
3B	Bianka Bell	SR.	LSU Tigers
SS	Sami Fagan	SR.	Missouri Tigers
OF	Amanda Lorenz	FR.	Florida Gators
OF	Karley Wester	JR.	Notre Dame Fighting Irish
OF	Allexis Bennett	SR.	UCLA Bruins
UT	Rainey Gaffin	SR.	Tennessee Lady Vols
UT	Cammi Prantl	SR.	Ohio State Buckeyes
AT-L	Tina Iosefa	SR.	Georgia Bulldogs
AT-L	Vanessa Shippy	SO.	Oklahoma State Cowgirls
AT-L	Jessica Warren	SO.	FSU Seminoles
AT-L	Victoria Vidales	SO.	Texas A&M Aggies
AT-L	Sahvanna Jaquish	JR.	LSU Tigers
AT-L	Kiki Stokes	SR.	Nebraska Cornhuskers
AT-L	Taylor Glover	JR.	CSUN Matadors
