= 2016 Oklahoma Sooners softball team =

American college softball season

2016 Oklahoma Sooners softball

National Champion NCAA Norman Super Regional champion NCAA Norman Regional Big 12 regular season champion
- Conference: Big 12 Conference
- Record: 57–8 (17–1 Big 12)
- Head coach: Patty Gasso (22nd season)
- Home stadium: OU Softball Complex

2016 Big 12 Conference softball standings
	Conf.				Overall
Team	W		L	PCT	W		L	PCT
No. 1 Oklahoma ‍†‍‍^{y}	17	–	1	.944	57	–	8	.877
No. 21 Baylor ‍‍‍^{y}	13	–	4	.765	45	–	14	.763
Texas ‍‍‍^{y}	10	–	7	.588	38	–	16	.704
Kansas ‍‍‍	8	–	9	.471	31	–	20	.608
Oklahoma State ‍‍‍^{y}	6	–	11	.353	32	–	26	.552
Texas Tech ‍‍‍	6	–	12	.333	23	–	32	.418
Iowa State ‍‍‍	1	–	17	.056	20	–	35	.364
† – Conference champion y – Invited to the NCAA tournament Rankings from NFCA

The 2016 Oklahoma Sooners softball team represented the University of Oklahoma in the 2016 NCAA Division I softball season. The Sooners were coached by Patty Gasso, who was in her twenty-second season. The Sooners finished with a record of 57–8. They played their home games at OU Softball Complex and competed in the Big 12 Conference, where they finished first with a 17–1 record.

The Sooners were invited to the 2016 NCAA Division I softball tournament, where they swept the West Regional and then completed a run through the Women's College World Series to claim the NCAA Women's College World Series Championship.

== Roster ==
2016 Oklahoma Sooners roster
Pitchers: 4 – Brittany Finney – freshman; 7 – Jayden Chestnut – freshman; 8 – Paige Parker – sophomore; 18 – Kelsey Stevens – senior; Catchers: 15 – Lea Wodach – sophomore	Infielders: 2 - Sydney Romero – freshman; 3 – Kelsey Arnold – sophomore; 17 - Shay Knighten – freshman; 20 – Caleigh Clifton – freshman; 33 – Zaida Puni – freshman	Outfielders: 1 – Nicole Pendley – sophomore; 9 – Tori Nirschl – senior; 24 – Raegan Rogers – freshman; 27 – Kylie Lundberg – freshman; 34 – Falepolima Aviu – freshman; 48 – Erin Miller – senior; Utility: 6 – Macey Hatfield – junior; 11 – Paris Townsend – senior; 22 – Kady Self – senior

== Schedule ==
Legend
	Oklahoma win
	Oklahoma loss
*	Non-Conference game

2016 Oklahoma Sooners softball game log
Regular season

February
Date	Opponent	Site/stadium	Score	Overall record	Big 12 Record
Feb 12	vs No. 14 Minnesota*	Eller Media Stadium • Paradise, NV (Sportco Kickoff Classic)	L 0–1	0–1	
Feb 12	vs No. 20 Washington*	Eller Media Stadium • Paradise, NV (Sportco Kickoff Classic)	L 3–10	0–2	
Feb 13	vs Lamar*	Eller Media Stadium • Paradise, NV (Sportco Kickoff Classic)	W 12–2^{5}	1–2	
Feb 13	vs Syracuse*	Eller Media Stadium • Paradise, NV (Sportco Kickoff Classic)	W 7–0	2–2	
Feb 14	vs Long Beach State*	Eller Media Stadium • Paradise, NV (Sportco Kickoff Classic)	W 7–0	3–2	
Feb 19	vs Creighton*	NM State Softball Complex • Las Cruces, NM (Troy Cox Classic)	W 11–4	4–2	
Feb 19	at New Mexico State*	NM State Softball Complex • Las Cruces, NM (Troy Cox Classic)	W 11–1^{5}	5–2	
Feb 20	vs Western Michigan*	NM State Softball Complex • Las Cruces, NM (Troy Cox Classic)	W 12–0^{5}	6–2	
Feb 20	at New Mexico State*	NM State Softball Complex • Las Cruces, NM (Troy Cox Classic)	W 8–0^{6}	7–2	
Feb 25	vs Oregon State*	Big League Dreams • Palm Springs, CA (Mary Nutter Classic)	L 4–6	7–3	
Feb 25	vs Utah*	Big League Dreams • Palm Springs, CA (Mary Nutter Classic)	W 6–2	8–3	
Feb 26	vs No. 2 Michigan*	Big League Dreams • Palm Springs, CA (Mary Nutter Classic)	L 9–16	8–4	
Feb 26	vs No. 20 Fresno State*	Big League Dreams • Palm Springs, CA (Mary Nutter Classic)	W 3–2	9–4	
Feb 27	vs No. 11 UCLA*	Big League Dreams • Palm Springs, CA (Mary Nutter Classic)	W 11–7	10–4	

March
Date	Opponent	Site/stadium	Score	Overall record	Big 12 Record
Mar 5	Dartmouth*	OU Softball Complex • Norman, OK	W 9–0^{5}	11–4	
Mar 5	Dartmouth*	OU Softball Complex • Norman, OK	W 7–0	12–4	
Mar 11	Saint Louis*	OU Softball Complex • Norman, OK (OU Tournament)	W 9–4	13–4	
Mar 11	BYU*	OU Softball Complex • Norman, OK (OU Tournament)	W 8–0^{5}	14–4	
Mar 12	BYU*	OU Softball Complex • Norman, OK (OU Tournament)	W 3–0	15–4	
Mar 12	Maryland*	OU Softball Complex • Norman, OK (OU Tournament)	W 11–2^{6}	16–4	
Mar 13	Maryland*	OU Softball Complex • Norman, OK (OU Tournament)	W 11–0^{6}	17–4	
Mar 16	No. 22 Minnesota*	OU Softball Complex • Norman, OK	L 10–12^{8}	17–5	
Mar 18	vs DePaul*	Anderson Family Field • Fullerton, CA (Easton Tournament)	W 6–1	18–5	
Mar 18	at Cal State Fullerton*	Anderson Family Field • Fullerton, CA (Easton Tournament)	L 5–7	18–6	
Mar 19	vs Grand Canyon*	Anderson Family Field • Fullerton, CA (Easton Tournament)	W 7–1	19–6	
Mar 19	vs No. 6 Alabama*	Anderson Family Field • Fullerton, CA (Easton Tournament)	W 2–0	20–6	
Mar 20	vs No. 23 Nebraska*	Anderson Family Field • Fullerton, CA (Easton Tournament)	W 4–2	21–6	
Mar 25	UMKC*	OU Softball Complex • Norman, OK	W 10–0^{5}	22–6	
Mar 26	vs UMKC*	ASA Hall of Fame Stadium • Oklahoma City, OK	W 8–4	23–6	
Mar 30	vs Oklahoma State	ASA Hall of Fame Stadium • Oklahoma City, OK	W 10–2^{5}	24–6	1–0

April
Date	Opponent	Site/stadium	Score	Overall record	Big 12 Record
Apr 1	Kansas	OU Softball Complex • Norman, OK	W 5–2	25–6	2–0
Apr 2	Kansas	OU Softball Complex • Norman, OK	L 2–5	26–6	2–1
Apr 3	Kansas	OU Softball Complex • Norman, OK	W 4–0	27–6	3–1
Apr 6	Wichita State*	OU Softball Complex • Norman, OK	W 10–1^{5}	28–6	
Apr 8	at No. 19 Baylor	Getterman Stadium • Waco, TX	W 5–0	29–6	3–1
Apr 9	at No. 19 Baylor	Getterman Stadium • Waco, TX	W 4–0	30–6	5–1
Apr 10	at No. 19 Baylor	Getterman Stadium • Waco, TX	W 7–4	31–6	6–1
Apr 13	North Texas*	OU Softball Complex • Norman, OK	W 6–1	32–6	
Apr 15	Texas	OU Softball Complex • Norman, OK	W 9–8	33–6	7–1
Apr 15	Texas	OU Softball Complex • Norman, OK	W 5–3	34–6	8–1
Apr 16	Texas	OU Softball Complex • Norman, OK	W 5–3	35–6	9–1
Apr 20	at Arkansas*	Bogle Park • Fayetteville, AR	W 3–1	36–6	
Apr 23	at No. 12 Tennessee*	Sherri Parker Lee Stadium • Knoxville, TN (Tennessee Classic)	W 9–0	37–6	
Apr 23	vs Radford*	Sherri Parker Lee Stadium • Knoxville, TN (Tennessee Classic)	W 9–0^{5}	38–6	
Apr 24	vs Lipscomb*	Sherri Parker Lee Stadium • Knoxville, TN (Tennessee Classic)	W 2–0	39–6	
Apr 29	at Iowa State	Cyclone Sports Complex • Ames, IA	W 4–2	40–6	10–1
Apr 29	at Iowa State	Cyclone Sports Complex • Ames, IA	W 8–1	41–6	11–1

May
Date	Opponent	Site/stadium	Score	Overall record	Big 12 Record
May 1	at Iowa State	Cyclone Sports Complex • Ames, IA	W 12–1	42–6	12–1
May 4	at Tulsa*	Collins Family Softball Complex • Tulsa, OK	W 4–1	43–6	
May 6	Texas Tech	OU Softball Complex • Norman, OK	W 8–0^{5}	43–6	13–1
May 7	Texas Tech	OU Softball Complex • Norman, OK	W 4–0	44–6	14–1
May 8	Texas Tech	OU Softball Complex • Norman, OK	W 10–1^{5}	45–6	15–1
May 13	at Oklahoma State	Cowgirl Stadium • Stillwater, OK	W 8–0^{5}	46–6	16–1
May 14	Oklahoma State	OU Softball Complex • Norman, OK	W 5–2	47–6	17–1

Postseason

NCAA Norman Regional
Date	Opponent	Site/stadium	Score	Overall record	Reg. Record
May 20	Wichita State	OU Softball Complex • Norman, OK	W 7–2	48–7	1–0
May 21	Ole Miss	OU Softball Complex • Norman, OK	W 9–1	49–4	2–0
May 22	Ole Miss	OU Softball Complex • Norman, OK	W 3–0	50–4	3–0

NCAA Norman Super Regional
Date	Opponent	Site/stadium	Score	Overall record	SR Record
May 26	(14) Louisiana–Lafayette	OU Softball Complex • Norman, OK	W 8–2	51–7	1–0
May 27	(14) Louisiana–Lafayette	OU Softball Complex • Norman, OK	W 7–6	52–7	2–0

NCAA Women's College World Series
Date	Opponent	Site/stadium	Score	Overall record	WCWS Record
June 3	(6) Alabama	ASA Hall of Fame Stadium • Oklahoma City, OK	W 3–0^{8}	53–7	1–0
June 4	(2) Michigan	ASA Hall of Fame Stadium • Oklahoma City, OK	W 7–5	54–7	2–0
June 5	(10) LSU	ASA Hall of Fame Stadium • Oklahoma City, OK	W 7–3	55–7	3–0
June 6	(4) Auburn	ASA Hall of Fame Stadium • Oklahoma City, OK	W 3–2	56–7	4–0
June 7	(4) Auburn	ASA Hall of Fame Stadium • Oklahoma City, OK	L 7–11^{8}	56–8	4–1
June 8	(4) Auburn	ASA Hall of Fame Stadium • Oklahoma City, OK	W 2–1	57–8	5–1
