= 2016 UCLA Bruins softball team =

American college softball season

2016 UCLA Bruins softball

NCAA Eugene Super Regional champion NCAA Los Angeles Regional champion

Women's College World Series, 0–2
- Conference: Pac-12 Conference
- Record: 40–16–1 (16–5–1 Pac-12)
- Head coach: Kelly Inouye-Perez (10th season)
- Home stadium: Easton Stadium

2016 Pac-12 Conference softball standings
	Conf.						Overall
Team	W		L		T	PCT	W		L		T	PCT
No. 10 Oregon ‍†‍‍^{y}	20	–	4	–	0	.833	48	–	10	–	0	.828
No. 9 UCLA ‍‍‍	16	–	5	–	1	.750	40	–	16	–	1	.711
No. 13 Washington ‍‍‍	16	–	8	–	0	.667	39	–	15	–	0	.722
No. 16 Utah ‍‍‍	13	–	10	–	0	.565	35	–	22	–	0	.614
No. 14 Arizona ‍‍‍	13	–	11	–	0	.542	40	–	21	–	0	.656
California ‍‍‍	11	–	11	–	1	.500	33	–	24	–	1	.578
Oregon State ‍‍‍	9	–	14	–	0	.391	30	–	20	–	1	.598
Arizona State ‍‍‍	6	–	17	–	0	.261	32	–	26	–	0	.552
Stanford ‍‍‍	0	–	24	–	0	.000	13	–	35	–	0	.271
† – Conference champion y – Invited to the NCAA tournament As of June 30, 2016; Rankings from NFCA/USA Today

The 2016 UCLA Bruins softball team represented the University of California, Los Angeles in the 2016 NCAA Division I softball season. The Bruins were coached by Kelly Inouye-Perez, in her tenth season as head coach. The Bruins played their home games at Easton Stadium and finished with a record of 40–16–1. They competed in the Pac-12 Conference, where they finished second with a 16–5–1 record.

The Bruins were invited to the 2016 NCAA Division I softball tournament, where they won the Los Angeles Regional and Eugene Super Regional to advance to the Women's College World Series. They finished tied for seventh place after losses to eventual runner-up Auburn and Florida State.

== Personnel ==
=== Roster ===
2016 UCLA Bruins roster
Pitchers: 00 - Rachel Garcia - Freshman; 15 - Johanna Grauer - Sophomore; 18 - Selina Ta'amilo - Sophomore; 55 - Paige McDuffee - (redshirt) Junior; Catchers: 7 - Brittany Moeai - Senior; 12 - Jazmine Sosa - Senior; 25 - Paige Halstead - Freshman; 88 - Madeline Jelenicki - Sophomore	Outfielders: 4 - Gabrielle Maurice - Junior; 13 - Imani Johnson - Freshman; 22 - Danae Blodgett - Freshman; 23 - Stevie Wisz - Freshman; 24 - Robyn Corruth - Junior; 34 - Izzy Ordorica - Sophomore; 42 - Jelly Felix - Junior; 48 - Allexis Bennett - Senior	Infielders: 14 - Mysha Sataraka - Senior; 21 - Taylor Pack - Freshman; 33 - Brianna Tautalafua - Freshman; 99 - Delaney Spaulding - Junior; Utility: 8 - Kylee Perez - Sophomore; 46 - Zoe Shaw - Freshman

=== Coaches ===
2016 UCLA Bruins softball coaching staff
- Kelly Inouye-Perez - Head coach - 10th season
- Lisa Fernandez - Assistant Coach - 18th season
- Kirk Walker - Assistant Coach - 15th season

== Schedule ==
Legend
	UCLA win
	UCLA loss
*	Non-Conference game

2017 UCLA Bruins softball game log
Regular season

February
Date	Opponent	Site/stadium	Score	Overall record	Pac-12 record
Feb 12	vs Colorado State*	Davis Diamond • College Station, TX	W 6–5	1–0	
Feb 12	at Texas A&M*	Davis Diamond • College Station, TX	L 1–5	1–1	
Feb 13	vs Wichita State*	Davis Diamond • College Station, TX	W 6–5	2–1	
Feb 13	at Texas A&M*	Davis Diamond • College Station, TX	W 7–3	3–1	
Feb 14	vs Colorado State*	Davis Diamond • College Station, TX	W 7–3	4–1	
Feb 19	vs UCF*	Big League Dreams Sports Park • Cathedral City, CA (Mary Nutter Collegiate Classic I)	W 2–0	5–1	
Feb 20	vs Notre Dame*	Big League Dreams Sports Park • Cathedral City, CA (Mary Nutter Collegiate Classic I)	L 6–8	5–2	
Feb 20	vs Cal Poly*	Big League Dreams Sports Park • Cathedral City, CA (Mary Nutter Collegiate Classic I)	W 9–1 ^{(5)}	6–2	
Feb 21	vs LSU*	Big League Dreams Sports Park • Cathedral City, CA (Mary Nutter Collegiate Classic I)	L 5–10	6–3	
Feb 21	vs Pacific*	Big League Dreams Sports Park • Cathedral City, CA (Mary Nutter Collegiate Classic I)	W 9–1 ^{(5)}	7–3	
Feb 25	vs Florida*	Big League Dreams Sports Park • Cathedral City, CA (Mary Nutter Collegiate Classic II)	L 1–2	7–4	
Feb 26	vs Georgia*	Big League Dreams Sports Park • Cathedral City, CA (Mary Nutter Collegiate Classic II)	W 14–6 ^{(6)}	8–4	
Feb 26	vs BYU*	Big League Dreams Sports Park • Cathedral City, CA (Mary Nutter Collegiate Classic II)	W 9–4	9–4	
Feb 27	vs Oklahoma*	Big League Dreams Sports Park • Cathedral City, CA (Mary Nutter Collegiate Classic II)	L 7–11	9–5	
Feb 28	vs Northwestern*	Big League Dreams Sports Park • Cathedral City, CA (Mary Nutter Collegiate Classic II)	L 2–7	9–6	

March
Date	Opponent	Site/stadium	Score	Overall record	Pac-12 record
Mar 2	Michigan*	Easton Stadium • Los Angeles, CA	L 6–8	9–7	
Mar 4	Florida State*	Easton Stadium • Los Angeles, CA	L 0–3	9–8	
Mar 4	UC Santa Barbara*	Easton Stadium • Los Angeles, CA	W 3–2	10–8	
Mar 5	Charleston Southern*	Easton Stadium • Los Angeles, CA	W 9–0 ^{(5)}	11–8	
Mar 5	Syracuse*	Easton Stadium • Los Angeles, CA	W 3–2	12–8	
Mar 6	UC Davis*	Easton Stadium • Los Angeles, CA	W 9–1 ^{(5)}	13–8	
Mar 12	vs Utah Valley*	Mayfair Park • Lakewood, CA	W 19–0 ^{(5)}	14–8	
Mar 12	vs Iowa State*	Mayfair Park • Lakewood, CA	W 7–1	15–8	
Mar 13	vs Princeton*	Mayfair Park • Lakewood, CA	W 13–1 ^{(5)}	16–8	
Mar 13	vs Long Beach State*	Mayfair Park • Lakewood, CA	W 3–2	17–8	
Mar 19	at California	Levine-Fricke Field • Berkeley, CA	W 3–2 ^{(9)}	18–8	1–0
Mar 21	at California	Levine-Fricke Field • Berkeley, CA	T 3–3 ^{(5)}	18–8–1	1–0–1
Mar 24	Washington	Easton Stadium • Los Angeles, CA	L 0–9 ^{(6)}	18–9–1	1–1–1
Mar 25	Washington	Easton Stadium • Los Angeles, CA	L 5–6	18–10–1	1–2–1
Mar 26	Washington	Easton Stadium • Los Angeles, CA	W 10–8	19–10–1	2–2–1
Mar 29	at Cal State Fullerton*	Anderson Family Field • Fullerton, CA	W 5–4	20–10–1	

April
Date	Opponent	Site/stadium	Score	Overall record	Pac-12 record
Apr 1	at Oregon	Jane Sanders Stadium • Eugene, OR	W 16–6 ^{(5)}	21–10–1	3–2–1
Apr 2	at Oregon	Jane Sanders Stadium • Eugene, OR	L 5–6	21–11–1	3–3–1
Apr 3	at Oregon	Jane Sanders Stadium • Eugene, OR	W 4–1	22–11–1	4–3–1
Apr 9	Stanford	Easton Stadium • Los Angeles, CA	W 13–9	23–11–1	5–3–1
Apr 10	Stanford	Easton Stadium • Los Angeles, CA	W 8–0 ^{(6)}	24–11–1	6–3–1
Apr 11	Stanford	Easton Stadium • Los Angeles, CA	W 2–1	25–11–1	7–3–1
Apr 13	Cal State Northridge*	Easton Stadium • Los Angeles, CA	W 6–0	26–11–1	
Apr 15	Oregon State	Easton Stadium • Los Angeles, CA	L 2–8	26–12–1	7–4–1
Apr 16	Oregon State	Easton Stadium • Los Angeles, CA	W 7–5	27–12–1	8–4–1
Apr 17	Oregon State	Easton Stadium • Los Angeles, CA	W 8–0 ^{(5)}	28–12–1	9–4–1
Apr 23	at Arizona	Rita Hillenbrand Memorial Stadium • Tucson, AZ	W 8–6	29–12–1	10–4–1
Apr 24	at Arizona	Rita Hillenbrand Memorial Stadium • Tucson, AZ	L 4–8	29–13–1	10–5–1
Apr 25	at Arizona	Rita Hillenbrand Memorial Stadium • Tucson, AZ	W 8–7	30–13–1	11–5–1
Apr 29	Arizona State	Easton Stadium • Los Angeles, CA	W 8–6	31–13–1	12–5–1
Apr 30	Arizona State	Easton Stadium • Los Angeles, CA	W 6–5	32–13–1	13–5–1

May
Date	Opponent	Site/stadium	Score	Overall record	Pac-12 record
May 1	Arizona State	Easton Stadium • Los Angeles, CA	W 9–4	33–13–1	14–5–1
May 6	at Utah	Dumke Family Softball Stadium • Salt Lake City, UT	W 15–7 ^{(5)}	34–13–1	15–5–1
May 7	at Utah	Dumke Family Softball Stadium • Salt Lake City, UT	W 8–0 ^{(6)}	35–13–1	16–5–1

Postseason

NCAA Los Angeles Regional
Date	Opponent	Seed	Site/stadium	Score	Overall record	Reg record
May 20	Cal State Bakersfield	(12)	Easton Stadium • Los Angeles, CA	W 7–0	36–13–1	1–0
May 21	Cal State Fullerton	(12)	Easton Stadium • Los Angeles, CA	W 3–2	37–13–1	2–0
May 22	Cal State Fullerton	(12)	Easton Stadium • Los Angeles, CA	W 5–4	38–13–1	3–0

NCAA Los Angeles Super Regional
Date	Opponent	Seed	Site/stadium	Score	Overall record	SR record
May 28	at Oregon	(12)	Jane Sanders Stadium • Eugene, OR	L 1–8	38–14–1	0–1
May 29	at Oregon	(12)	Jane Sanders Stadium • Eugene, OR	W 2–1 ^{(9)}	39–14–1	1–1
May 29	at Oregon	(12)	Jane Sanders Stadium • Eugene, OR	W 2–1	40–14–1	2–1

NCAA Women's College World Series
Date	Opponent	Seed	Site/stadium	Score	Overall record	WCWS Record
June 2	(4) Auburn	(12)	ASA Hall of Fame Stadium • Oklahoma City, OK	L 3–10	40–15–1	0–1
June 3	(8) Florida State	(12)	ASA Hall of Fame Stadium • Oklahoma City, OK	L 4–8	40–16–1	0–2
