= 2016 Georgia State Panthers softball team =

American college softball season

2016 Georgia State Panthers softball
- Conference: Sun Belt Conference
- Record: 33–28 (13–11 SBC)
- Head coach: Roger Kincaid
- Home stadium: Robert E. Heck Baseball Complex

2016 Sun Belt Conference softball standings
| | Conf. | | | | Overall |
| Team | W | | L | PCT | W | | L | PCT |
|---|---|---|---|---|---|---|---|---|
| No. 12 Louisiana–Lafayette ‍†‍‡‍^{y} | 21 | – | 2 | .913 | 46 | – | 9 | .836 |
| South Alabama ‍‍‍ | 17 | – | 6 | .739 | 33 | – | 18 | .647 |
| Texas State ‍‍‍^{y} | 15 | – | 9 | .625 | 40 | – | 22 | .645 |
| Georgia State ‍‍‍ | 13 | – | 11 | .542 | 33 | – | 28 | .541 |
| Georgia Southern ‍‍‍ | 13 | – | 11 | .542 | 30 | – | 27 | .526 |
| Troy ‍‍‍ | 11 | – | 13 | .458 | 31 | – | 25 | .554 |
| UT Arlington ‍‍‍ | 8 | – | 16 | .333 | 29 | – | 20 | .592 |
| Louisiana–Monroe ‍‍‍ | 7 | – | 17 | .292 | 24 | – | 34 | .414 |
| Appalachian State ‍‍‍ | 2 | – | 22 | .083 | 11 | – | 45 | .196 |
‡ – Tournament champion As of March 18, 2019; Rankings from NFCA

The 2016 Georgia State Panthers softball team represented Georgia State University in the 2016 NCAA Division I softball season. The Panthers competed in the Sun Belt Conference and were led by six-year head coach Roger Kincaid. Georgia State played its home games at the Robert E. Heck Softball Complex in Panthersville, Georgia.

== Roster ==
2016 Georgia State roster
| Pitchers: 13 Bridgette Flaherty – Sophomore; 15 Katie Worley - Senior; 17 Chelsea Stanfield - Senior; 26 Amanda Chance - Freshman; 43 Taylor Thorpe - Taylor Thorpe; 99 Annie Davis - Sophomore | Catchers: 4 Ivie Drake – Sophomore; 14 Mandy Blackwell - Junior; Infielders: 0 Arden Jobe - Freshman; 1 Taylor Anderson - "Senior"; 3 Taylor Bradley - Sophomore; 11 Kensey Caldwell - Junior; 21 Ambria Derry – Freshman; 23 Kristin Hawkins - Sophomore | Outfielders: 5 Megan Litumbe - Junior; 7 Cassidy Faulk - Sophomore; 9 Morgan Brown - Junior; 10 Reagan Morgan - Freshman; 16 Brenna Skalski - Sophomore; 62 Remington Hasty - Freshman; 77 Mallory Koepke - Junior |

== Schedule ==
2016 Georgia State Panthers softball game log
Regular season
February

| # | Date | Opponent | Site/stadium | Score | Overall record | SBC record |
|---|---|---|---|---|---|---|
| 1 | February 12 | #4 Oregon | Tempe, AZ | 0-11 | 0-1 | - |
| 2 | February 12 | Cal Poly | Tempe, AZ | 4-5 | 0-2 | - |
| 3 | February 13 | Indiana | Tempe, AZ | 1-4 | 0-3 | - |
| 4 | February 13 | #23 Utah | Tempe, AZ | 0-9 | 0-4 | - |
| 5 | February 14 | #24 Notre Dame | Tempe, AZ | 4-10 | 0-5 | - |
| 6 | February 17 | Georgia Tech | Bob Heck Field | 3-2 | 1-5 | - |
| 7 | February 19 | Miami (OH) | Bob Heck Field | 3-0 | 2-5 | - |
| 8 | February 19 | Maryland | Bob Heck Field | 4-3 | 3-5 | - |
| 9 | February 20 | #5 Alabama | Bob Heck Field | 0-9 | 3-6 | - |
| 10 | February 21 | Mercer | Bob Heck Field | 8-2 | 4-6 | - |
| 11 | February 24 | St. John's | Bob Heck Field | 8-7 | 5-6 | - |
| 12 | February 26 | Villanova | Clearwater, FL | 2-15 | 5-7 | - |
| 13 | February 26 | Eastern Michigan | Clearwater, FL | 11-0 | 6-7 | - |
| 14 | February 27 | Seton Hall | Clearwater, FL | 10-7 | 7-7 | - |
| 15 | February 27 | Eastern Michigan | Clearwater, FL | 5-0 | 8-7 | - |
| 16 | February 28 | Villanova | Clearwater, FL | 15-2 | 9-7 | - |

March

| # | Date | Opponent | Site/stadium | Score | Overall record | SBC record |
|---|---|---|---|---|---|---|
| 17 | March 2 | Kennesaw State | Bob Heck Field | 2-1 | 10-7 | - |
| 18 | March 4 | Indiana | Auburn, AL | 0-3 | 10-8 | - |
| 19 | March 5 | Bryant | Auburn, AL | 6-1 | 11-8 | - |
| 20 | March 6 | #3 Auburn | Auburn, AL | 0-7 | 11-9 | - |
| 21 | March 6 | #3 Auburn | Auburn, AL | 0-9 | 11-10 | - |
| 22 | March 9 | Boston College | Bob Heck Field | 0-1 | 11-11 | - |
| 23 | March 12 | Troy | Troy, AL | 2-5 | 11-12 | 0–1 |
| 24 | March 12 | Troy | Troy, AL | 6-1 | 12-12 | 1-1 |
| 25 | March 13 | Troy, AL | Troy, AL | 6-2 | 13-12 | 2–1 |
| 26 | March 15 | Kennesaw State | Kennesaw, GA | 13-0 | 14-12 | 2–1 |
| 27 | March 16 | Western Carolina | Bob Heck Field | 11-4 | 15-12 | 2–1 |
| 28 | March 16 | Western Carolina | Bob Heck Field | 10-5 | 16-12 | 2–1 |
| 29 | March 19 | Texas State | Bob Heck Field | 4-1 | 17-12 | 3–1 |
| 30 | March 19 | Texas State | Bob Heck Field | 2-0 | 18-12 | 4–1 |
| 31 | March 22 | Texas State | Bob Heck Field | 1-4 | 18-13 | 4–2 |
| 32 | March 23 | #3 Auburn | Bob Heck Field | 4-8 | 18-14 | 4–2 |
| 33 | March 30 | Furman | Greenville, SC | 4-10 | 18-15 | 4–2 |
| 34 | March 30 | Furman | Greenville, SC | 4-0 | 19-15 | 4–2 |

April

| # | Date | Opponent | Site/stadium | Score | Overall record | SBC record |
|---|---|---|---|---|---|---|
| 35 | April 2 | #25 South Alabama | Mobile, AL | 0-7 | 19-16 | 4–3 |
| 36 | April 2 | #25 South Alabama | Mobile, AL | 2-5 | 19-17 | 4-4 |
| 37 | April 3 | #25 South Alabama | Mobile, AL | 0-5 | 19-18 | 4–5 |
| 38 | April 6 | Georgia Tech | Atlanta, GA | 3-4 | 19-19 | 4–5 |
| 39 | April 9 | #5 Louisiana | Bob Heck Field | 1-4 | 19-20 | 4–6 |
| 40 | April 9 | #5 Louisiana | Bob Heck Field | 5-6 | 19-21 | 4–7 |
| 41 | April 10 | #5 Louisiana | Bob Heck Field | 0-12 | 19-22 | 4–8 |
| 42 | April 12 | Alabama State | Bob Heck Field | 6-0 | 20-22 | 4–8 |
| 43 | April 13 | Chattanooga | Chattanooga, TN | 11-0 | 21-22 | 4–8 |
| 44 | April 16 | Appalachian State | Boone, NC | 15-0 | 22-22 | 5–8 |
| 45 | April 16 | Appalachian State | Boone, NC | 11-9 | 23-22 | 6–8 |
| 46 | April 17 | Appalachian State | Boone, NC | 9-3 | 24-22 | 7–8 |
| 47 | April 20 | #12 Georgia | Athens, GA | 0-8 | 24-23 | 7–8 |
| 48 | April 23 | UT Arlington | Bob Heck Field | 6-8 | 24-24 | 7–9 |
| 49 | April 23 | UT Arlington | Bob Heck Field | 7-2 | 25-24 | 8–9 |
| 50 | April 24 | UT Arlington | Bob Heck Field | 4-2 | 26-24 | 9-9 |
| 51 | April 30 | ULM | Monroe, LA | 0-2 | 26-25 | 9–10 |
| 52 | April 30 | ULM | Monroe, LA | 6-2 | 27-25 | 10-10 |

May

| # | Date | Opponent | Site/stadium | Score | Overall record | SBC record |
|---|---|---|---|---|---|---|
| 53 | May 1 | ULM | Monroe, LA | 7-3 | 28-25 | 11–10 |
| 54 | May 6 | Georgia Southern | Bob Heck Field | 8-0 | 29-25 | 12–10 |
| 55 | May 7 | Georgia Southern | Bob Heck Field | 4-2 | 30-25 | 13–10 |
| 55 | May 7 | Georgia Southern | Bob Heck Field | 3-4 | 30-26 | 13–11 |

Sun Belt Tournament

| # | Date | Opponent | Site/stadium | Score | Overall record | Tournament record |
|---|---|---|---|---|---|---|
| 57 | May 11–14 | ULM | Mobile, AL | 10-2 | 31-26 | 13–11 |
| 58 | May 11–14 | #9 Louisiana | Mobile, AL | 1-13 | 31-27 | 13–11 |
| 59 | May 11–14 | Troy | Mobile, AL | 8-0 | 32-27 | 13–11 |
| 60 | May 11–14 | South Alabama | Mobile, AL | 3-2 | 33-27 | 13–11 |
| 61 | May 11–14 | Texas State | Mobile, AL | 1-9 | 33-28 | 13–11 |
