= 2016 SEC softball tournament =

2016 Southeastern Conference softball tournament
- Teams: 12
- Format: Single-elimination tournament
- Finals site: Nusz Park; Starkville, MS
- Champions: Auburn (2nd title)
- Runner-up: LSU (10th title game)
- Winning coach: Clint Myers (2nd title)
- MVP: Emily Carasone (AUB)
- Television: SECN; ESPNU; ESPN

The 2016 SEC softball tournament was at Nusz Park on the campus of Mississippi State University in Starkville, Mississippi from May 11 through May 15, 2016. The tournament awarded the Southeastern Conference's automatic bid to the 2016 NCAA Division I softball tournament to the Auburn Tigers. The Championship game between Auburn and LSU was broadcast on ESPN and the semifinals were broadcast on ESPNU, while all other SEC tournament games were broadcast live on the SEC Network.

In addition to the TV broadcast, every game will be available to listen to online and through select radio stations via the SEC Radio Network.

2016 Southeastern Conference softball standings
	Conf.				Overall
Team	W		L	PCT	W		L	PCT
No. 1 Florida ‍‍‍	20	–	4	.833	52	–	4	.929
No. 12 Kentucky ‍‍‍	17	–	7	.708	43	–	11	.796
No. 10 Tennessee ‍‍‍	16	–	7	.696	40	–	13	.755
No. 6 Auburn ‍‍‡‍	16	–	7	.696	46	–	9	.836
No. 4 Alabama ‍‍‍	16	–	8	.667	45	–	11	.804
No. 16 Missouri ‍‍‍	14	–	10	.583	39	–	13	.750
No. 13 LSU ‍‍‍	13	–	11	.542	42	–	14	.750
No. 15 Georgia ‍‍‍	12	–	12	.500	40	–	16	.714
Ole Miss ‍‍‍	11	–	13	.458	38	–	19	.667
No. 17 Texas A&M ‍‍‍	9	–	15	.375	37	–	17	.685
South Carolina ‍‍‍	7	–	17	.292	35	–	20	.636
Mississippi State ‍‍‍	3	–	21	.125	25	–	30	.455
Arkansas ‍‍‍	1	–	23	.042	17	–	39	.304
‡ – Tournament champion As of May 8, 2016; Rankings from NFCA

== Tournament ==
1st Round; May 11th SECN
8	Georgia	2
9	Ole Miss	4
5	Alabama	7
12	Mississippi State	5
7	LSU	5
10	Texas A&M	4
6	Missouri	4
11	South Carolina	7^{(8)}

Quarterfinals; May 12th SECN
1	Florida	1
9	Ole Miss	0
4	Auburn	6
5	Alabama	4
2	Kentucky	1
7	LSU	3
3	Tennessee	5
11	South Carolina	1

Semifinals; May 13th ESPNU
1	Florida	1
4	Auburn	2
7	LSU	3^{(8)}
3	Tennessee	1

Finals; May 14th ESPN
4	Auburn	7
7	LSU	1

- Only the top 12 teams are able to play, therefore, Arkansas could not play in the tournament.
- Vanderbilt does not sponsor a softball team.
- All times listed are Central Daylight Time.
- Due to rain. 4 Auburn vs 5 Alabama was delayed to 11 AM on May 13.

== Schedule ==
Game	Time*	Matchup^{#}	Television	TV Announcers	Radio Announcers	Attendance
First Round – Wednesday, May 11
1	11:02 a.m.	#6 Missouri vs. #11 South Carolina	SEC Network	Adam Amin, Amanda Scarborough, & Laura Rutledge	Jack Condon & Mike Coulter	506
2	1:58 p.m.	#7 LSU vs. #10 Texas A&M	SEC Network	Adam Amin, Amanda Scarborough, & Laura Rutledge	Mike Coulter & Jack Condon	506
3	5:01 p.m.	#8 Georgia vs. #9 Ole Miss	SEC Network	Beth Mowins, Michele Smith, & Holly Rowe	Dave Shook & Mike Coulter	1,517
4	7:52 p.m.	#5 Alabama vs. #12 Mississippi State	SEC Network	Beth Mowins, Michele Smith, & Holly Rowe	Mike Coulter & Dave Shook	1,517
Quarterfinals – Thursday, May 12
5	11:02 a.m.	#3 Tennessee vs. #11 South Carolina	SEC Network	Adam Amin, Amanda Scarborough, & Laura Rutledge	Dave Shook & Mike Coulter	N/A
6	1:54 p.m.	#2 Kentucky vs. #7 LSU	SEC Network	Adam Amin, Amanda Scarborough, & Laura Rutledge	Dave Shook & Mike Coulter	N/A
7	4:02 p.m.	#1 Florida vs. #9 Ole Miss	SEC Network	Beth Mowins, Michele Smith, & Holly Rowe	Mike Coulter & Dave Shook	N/A
Semifinals – Friday, May 13
8	11:03 a.m.	#4 Auburn vs. #5 Alabama	ESPNU	Beth Mowins, Amanda Scarborough, Michele Smith, & Laura Rutledge	Mike Coulter & Dave Shook	2,213
9	2:11 p.m.	#3 Tennessee vs. #7 LSU	ESPNU	Beth Mowins, Amanda Scarborough, Michele Smith, & Laura Rutledge	Jack Condon & Mike Coulter	2,436
10	5:17 p.m.	#1 Florida vs. #4 Auburn	ESPNU	Beth Mowins, Amanda Scarborough, Michele Smith, & Laura Rutledge	Jack Condon & Mike Coulter	2,436
Championship – Saturday, May 14
11	4:02 p.m.	#4 Auburn vs. #7 LSU	ESPN2	Beth Mowins, Amanda Scarborough, Michele Smith, & Laura Rutledge	Jack Condon & Dave Shook	1,909
*Game times in CDT. # – Rankings denote tournament seed.
