= 2016 Sun Belt Conference softball tournament =

2016 Sun Belt Conference softball standings
| | Conf. | | | | Overall |
| Team | W | | L | PCT | W | | L | PCT |
|---|---|---|---|---|---|---|---|---|
| No. 12 Louisiana–Lafayette ‍†‍‡‍^{y} | 21 | – | 2 | .913 | 46 | – | 9 | .836 |
| South Alabama ‍‍‍ | 17 | – | 6 | .739 | 33 | – | 18 | .647 |
| Texas State ‍‍‍^{y} | 15 | – | 9 | .625 | 40 | – | 22 | .645 |
| Georgia State ‍‍‍ | 13 | – | 11 | .542 | 33 | – | 28 | .541 |
| Georgia Southern ‍‍‍ | 13 | – | 11 | .542 | 30 | – | 27 | .526 |
| Troy ‍‍‍ | 11 | – | 13 | .458 | 31 | – | 25 | .554 |
| UT Arlington ‍‍‍ | 8 | – | 16 | .333 | 29 | – | 20 | .592 |
| Louisiana–Monroe ‍‍‍ | 7 | – | 17 | .292 | 24 | – | 34 | .414 |
| Appalachian State ‍‍‍ | 2 | – | 22 | .083 | 11 | – | 45 | .196 |
‡ – Tournament champion As of March 18, 2019; Rankings from NFCA

The 2016 Sun Belt Conference softball tournament was held at the Bobcat Softball Complex on the campus of the Texas State University in San Marcos, Texas, from May 6 through May 9, 2015. The tournament winner earned the Sun Belt Conference's automatic bid to the 2016 NCAA Division I softball tournament. Day one of the tournament acted as a single elimination tournament, while Day 2 begins a double elimination format among the remaining 4 teams. The championship game was winner takes all. Days 1 & 2 of the tournament were streamed via sunbeltsports.org. Days 3 and 4 of the tournament (semifinals & championship) were televised on ESPN3.

== Tournament ==
=== Day one bracket 1 ===
| 1st Round | | | 2nd Round |
| | | | 8 | Louisiana-Monroe | 2 |
| | | | 4 | Georgia State | 10^{(6)} |
| 8 | Louisiana-Monroe | 2 | 4 | Georgia State | 10^{(6)} |
| 5 | Georgia Southern | 1 |

=== Day one bracket 2 ===
| 1st Round | | | 2nd Round |
| | | | 6 | Troy | 2 |
| | | | 3 | Texas State | 3^{(8)} |
| 7 | UT Arlington | 2 | 3 | Texas State | 3^{(8)} |
| 6 | Troy | 3^{(9)} |

=== Days two–four ===
3rd Round
1 | Louisiana-Lafayette | 10
5 | Georgia State | 2^{(6)}
2 | South Alabama | 6
6 | Louisiana-Monroe | 2
Lower round 1
5 | Georgia State | 8
6 | Louisiana-Monroe | 6

Semifinals
1 | Louisiana-Lafayette | 6
2 | South Alabama | 3
Lower final
2 | South Alabama | 3
5 | Georgia State | 1

Championship
1 | Louisiana-Lafayette
2 | South Alabama

- All times listed are Central Daylight Time.

== Broadcasters ==
- Day 1: Dan McDonald (sunbeltsports.org)
