= 2016 NCAA Division I softball tournament =

- Teams: 64
- Finals site: ASA Hall of Fame Stadium; Oklahoma City
- Champions: Oklahoma (3rd title)
- Runner-up: Auburn (2nd WCWS Appearance)
- Winning coach: Patty Gasso (3rd title)
- MOP: Paige Parker (Oklahoma)

The 2016 NCAA Division I softball tournament was held from May 20 through June 8, 2016 as the final part of the 2016 NCAA Division I softball season. The 64 NCAA Division I college softball teams were to be selected out of an eligible 293 teams on May 15, 2016. Thirty-two teams were awarded an automatic bid as champions of their conference, and thirty-two teams were selected at-large by the NCAA Division I softball selection committee. The tournament culminated with eight teams playing in the 2016 Women's College World Series at ASA Hall of Fame Stadium in Oklahoma City in which the Oklahoma Sooners were crowned the champions.

== Automatic bids ==
The Big 12, Big West, Mountain West, Pac-12, and West Coast Conference bids were awarded to the regular season champion. All other conferences have the automatic bid go to the conference tournament winner.

| Conference | School | Best finish | Reference |
|---|---|---|---|
| America East | Maine | Regionals (2004) | |
| American | Tulsa | Regionals (2006, 2008, 2009, 2011, 2012, 2013, 2014) | |
| ACC | Florida State | WCWS (1987, 1990, 1991, 1992, 1993, 2002, 2004, 2014) | |
| A-10 | Fordham | Regionals (2010, 2011, 2013, 2014, 2015) | |
| A-Sun | USC Upstate | Regionals (2013, 2014, 2015) | |
| Big 12 | Oklahoma | 1st (2000), (2013) | |
| Big East | Butler | 1st Appearance | |
| Big Sky | Weber State | Regionals (2015) | |
| Big South | Longwood | Regionals (2013, 2015) | |
| Big Ten | Minnesota | WCWS; 1976, 1978 | |
| Big West | Cal State Fullerton | 1st (1986) | |
| Colonial | James Madison | Regionals (2009, 2013, 2014, 2015) | |
| Conference USA | Florida Atlantic | Regionals (1999, 2000, 2001, 2002, 2003, 2004, 2005) | |
| Horizon League | Valparaiso | Regionals (2012, 2013) | |
| Ivy League | Princeton | WCWS (1995), (1996) | |
| MAC | Miami (OH) | Regionals (2005, 2009, 2012) | |
| MAAC | Marist | Regionals (2006, 2013) | |
| MEAC | Florida A&M | Regionals (1995, 1997, 1998, 1999, 2005, 2006, 2009, 2014, 2015) | |
| MVC | Wichita State | Regionals (1989, 2005) | |
| Mountain West | Fresno State | 1st (1998) | |
| Northeastern | LIU Brooklyn | Regionals (2008, 2012) | |
| OVC | Jacksonville State | Super Regionals (2009) | |
| Pac-12 | Oregon | 3rd (2014) | |
| Patriot League | Boston University | Regionals (1996, 2002, 2003, 2009, 2010, 2012, 2014) | |
| SEC | Auburn | 4th (2015) | |
| SoCon | Samford | 1st Appearance | |
| Southland | McNeese State | Regionals (1994, 2005, 2010) | |
| SWAC | Alabama State | 1st Appearance | |
| Summit League | North Dakota State | Super Regionals (2009) | |
| Sun Belt | Louisiana–Lafayette | WCWS (2008, 2014) | |
| WAC | Cal State Bakersfield | 1st Appearance | |
| WCC | BYU | Super Regionals (2010) | |

== National seeds ==
16 National Seeds were announced on the Selection Show Sunday, May 15 at 10 p.m. EDT on ESPNU. The 16 national seeds hosted the Regionals. Teams in italics advanced to Super Regionals. Teams in bold advanced to Women's College World Series.

1. Florida (53–5)
2. **Michigan** (46–5)
3. **Oklahoma** (47–7)
4. **Auburn** (49–9)
5. Oregon (44–8)
6. **Alabama** (46–12)
7. James Madison (46–4)
8. **Florida State** (48–8)

9. Kentucky (43–12)
10. **LSU** (45–15)
11. Washington (36–13)
12. **UCLA** (35–13–1)
13. Tennessee (41–14)
14. Louisiana–Lafayette (43–7)
15. Missouri (39–14)
16. **Georgia** (40–17)

== Regionals and Super Regionals ==
The Regionals took place May 19–22. The Columbia regional took place May 19–21 because of BYU's no Sunday-play policy. All other regionals occurred May 20–22. The Super Regionals took place from May 26–29.

=== Gainesville Super Regional ===
Round 1 | Round 2
1 | **Florida** | **11**^{(5)}
Alabama State | 0
1 | **Florida** | **5**
UCF | 0
Florida Atlantic | 0
**UCF** | **1**
Gainesville Regional
Alabama State | 0
**Florida Atlantic** | **8**
**UCF** | **2**
Florida Atlantic | 1
16 | **Georgia** | 6
Maine | 0
16 | **Georgia** | **5**
Northwestern | 2
Oklahoma State | 1
**Northwestern** | **2**
Athens Regionals
Maine | 1
**Oklahoma State** | **10**
Northwestern | 2
**Oklahoma State** | **3**

Regional Finals
1 | **Florida** | **8**^{(5)} | —
UCF | 0 | —
16 | **Georgia** | 3 | **6**
Oklahoma State | **5** | 0

Super Regionals
1 | Florida | 0 | 2 | —
16 | **Georgia** | **3** | **3** | —

=== Tallahassee Super Regional ===
Round 1 | Round 2
9 | **Kentucky** | **6**
Butler | 1
9 | Kentucky | 0
**Utah** | **3**
Illinois | 0
**Utah** | **1**
Lexington Regional
Butler | 1
**Illinois** | **2**
9 | **Kentucky** | **3**^{(8)}
Illinois | 2
8 | **Florida State** | **1**
Florida A&M | 0
8 | **Florida State** | **4**
South Carolina | 0
South Florida | 0
**South Carolina** | **2**
Tallahassee Regional
Florida A&M | 4
**South Florida** | **6**
**South Carolina** | **6**
South Florida | 0

Regional Finals
**Utah** | 0 | **5**
9 | Kentucky | **4** | 3
8 | **Florida State** | **2** | —
South Carolina | 1 | —

Super Regionals
Utah | 2 | 0 | —
8 | **Florida State** | **6** | **3** | —

=== Eugene Super Regional ===
Round 1 | Round 2
5 | **Oregon** | **8**^{(5)}
Fordham | 0
5 | **Oregon** | **5**
Baylor | 0
Long Beach State | 2
**Baylor** | **3**
Eugene Regional
Fordham | 1
**Long Beach State** | **9**
**Baylor** | **11**
Long Beach State | 2
12 | **UCLA** | **7**
Cal State Bakersfield | 0
12 | **UCLA** | **3**
Cal State Fullerton | 2
**Cal State Fullerton** | **6**
Fresno State | 4
Los Angeles Regional
Cal State Bakersfield | 5
**Fresno State** | **8**
**Cal State Fullerton** | **7**
Fresno State | 1

Regional Finals
5 | **Oregon** | **8** | —
Baylor | 1 | —
12 | **UCLA** | **5** | —
Cal State Fullerton | 4 | —

Super Regionals
5 | Oregon | **8** | 1 | 1
12 | **UCLA** | 1 | **2**^{(9)} | **2**

=== Auburn Super Regional ===
Round 1 | Round 2
13 | **Tennessee** | **10**^{(6)}
Marist | 2
13 | Tennessee | 0
**Arizona** | **4**
Ohio State | 0
**Arizona** | **2**
Knoxville Regional
Marist | 1
**Ohio State** | **6**
13 | **Tennessee** | **10**^{(5)}
Ohio State | 1
4 | **Auburn** | **2**
Jacksonville State | 1
4 | **Auburn** | **6**
USC Upstate | 1
Oregon State | 2
**USC Upstate** | **5**
Auburn Regional
**Jacksonville State** | **5**
Oregon State | 4
USC Upstate | 2
**Jacksonville State** | **3**

Regional Finals
**Arizona** | **4**^{(8)} | —
13 | Tennessee | 3 | —
4 | **Auburn** | **14**^{(5)} | —
Jacksonville State | 2 | —

Super Regionals
Arizona | **5** | 1 | 1
4 | **Auburn** | 3 | **4** | **6**

=== Norman Super Regional ===
Round 1 | Round 2
3 | **Oklahoma** | **7**
Wichita State | 2
3 | **Oklahoma** | **9**
Ole Miss | 1
Tulsa | 1
**Ole Miss** | **5**
Norman Regional
**Wichita State** | **2**
Tulsa | 1
**Ole Miss** | **4**
Wichita State | 0
14 | **Louisiana–Lafayette** | **9**
Boston University | 5
Texas | 1
14 | **Louisiana–Lafayette** | **9**
**Texas** | **5**
Texas A&M | 0
Lafayette Regional
**Texas A&M** | **6**
Boston University | 0
Texas | 3
**Texas A&M** | **9**

Regional Finals
3 | **Oklahoma** | **3** | —
Ole Miss | 0 | —
14 | **Louisiana–Lafayette** | **9**^{(9)} | —
Texas A&M | 8 | —

Super Regionals
3 | **Oklahoma** | **8** | **7** | —
14 | Louisiana–Lafayette | 2 | 6 | —

=== Tuscaloosa Super Regional ===
Round 1 | Round 2
11 | **Washington** | **14**^{(5)}
Weber State | 6
11 | **Washington** | **5**
Minnesota | 2
**Minnesota** | **7**
North Dakota State | 2
Seattle Regional
Weber State | 2
**North Dakota State** | **5**
**Minnesota** | **7**
North Dakota State | 5
6 | **Alabama** | **3**
Samford | 0
6 | **Alabama** | **3**
California | 1
**California** | **1**
Texas State | 0
Tuscaloosa Regional
Samford | 0
**Texas State** | **2**
**California** | **4**
Texas State | 3

Regional Finals
11 | **Washington** | **15**^{(6)} | —
Minnesota | 7 | —
6 | **Alabama** | **8** | —
California | 0 | —

Super Regionals
11 | Washington | 1 | 2 | —
6 | **Alabama** | **2**^{(8)} | **5** | —

=== Harrisonburg Super Regional ===
Round 1 | Round 2
7 | **James Madison** | **7**
Princeton | 0
**7** | **James Madison** | **10**
North Carolina | 1
Longwood | 4
**North Carolina** | **6**
Harrisonburg Regional
Princeton | 1
**Longwood** | **2**
North Carolina | 4
**Longwood** | **5**^{(9)}
10 | **LSU** | **10**^{(6)}
LIU Brooklyn | 2
10 | **LSU** | **4**
McNeese State | 1
Arizona State | 2
**McNeese State** | **5**
Baton Rouge Regional
LIU Brooklyn | 0
**Arizona State** | **1**
McNeese State | 2
**Arizona State** | **3**^{(14)}

Regional Finals
7 | **James Madison** | **5** | —
Longwood | 1 | —
10 | **LSU** | **2** | —
Arizona State | 0 | —

Super Regionals
7 | James Madison | **3** | 0 | 2
10 | **LSU** | 2 | **2** | **3**

=== Ann Arbor Super Regional ===
Round 1 | Round 2
15 | **Missouri** | **9**^{(5)}
BYU | 0
15 | **Missouri** | **8**^{(6)}
Nebraska | 0
**Nebraska** | **3**
Louisville | 2
Columbia Regional
**BYU** | **6**
Louisville | 4
**Nebraska** | **2**
BYU | 0
2 | **Michigan** | **8**^{(5)}
Valparaiso | 0
2 | **Michigan** | **6**
Miami (OH) | 0
Notre Dame | 2
**Miami (OH)** | **3**
Ann Arbor Regional
Valparaiso | 0
**Notre Dame** | **8**
Miami (OH) | 0
**Notre Dame** | **5**

Regional Finals
15 | **Missouri** | **9**^{(5)} | —
Nebraska | 0 | —
2 | **Michigan** | **6** | —
Notre Dame | 2 | —

Super Regionals
15 | Missouri | 3 | 4 | —
2 | **Michigan** | **5** | **5** | —

== Women's College World Series ==
The Women's College World Series was held June 2 through June 8, 2016, in Oklahoma City.

=== Participants ===
| School | Conference | Record (conference) | Head coach | WCWS appearances† (including 2016 WCWS) | WCWS best finish†* | WCWS W–L record† (excluding 2016 WCWS) |
|---|---|---|---|---|---|---|
| Alabama | SEC | 51–14 (17–8) | Patrick Murphy | 11 (last: 2015) | 1st (2012) | 17–19 |
| Auburn | SEC | 58–12 (16–7) | Clint Myers | 2 (last: 2015) | 3rd (2015) | 2–2 |
| Florida State | ACC | 55–10 (21–2) | Lonni Alameda | 9 (last: 2014) | 3rd (2002) | 6–15 |
| Georgia | SEC | 46–20 (12–12) | Lu Harris-Champer | 3 (last: 2010) | 3rd (2009, 2010) | 4–4 |
| LSU | SEC | 52–18 (13–11) | Beth Torina | 5 (last: 2015) | 3rd (2004, 2015) | 8–8 |
| Michigan | Big-10 | 52–7 (21–2) | Carol Hutchins | 12 (last: 2015) | 1st (2005) | 13–22 |
| Oklahoma | Big-12 | 52–7 (17–1) | Patty Gasso | 10 (last: 2014) | 1st (2000, 2013) | 17–14 |
| UCLA | Pac-12 | 40–16–1 (16–5–1) | Kelly Inouye-Perez | 26 (last: 2015) | 1st (1982, 1984, 1985, 1988, 1989, 1990; 1992, 1995*, 1999, 2003, 2004, 2010) | 95–30 |

=== Bracket ===
First round
16 | **Georgia** | **5**
8 | Florida State | 4
4 | **Auburn** | **10**
12 | UCLA | 3
8 | **Florida State** | **8**
12 | UCLA | 4
3 | **Oklahoma** | **3**^{(8)}
6 | Alabama | 0
2 | **Michigan** | **2**
10 | LSU | 0
6 | Alabama | 4
10 | **LSU** | **6**

Second round
16 | Georgia | 3
4 | **Auburn** | **4**
2 | Michigan | 0
8 | **Florida State** | **1**
3 | **Oklahoma** | **7**
2 | Michigan | 5
16 | Georgia | 1
10 | **LSU** | **4**

Semifinals
4 | **Auburn** | **8**^{(8)} | —
8 | Florida State | 7 | —
3 | **Oklahoma** | **7** | —
10 | LSU | 3 | —

Finals
4 | Auburn | 2 | **11**^{(8)} | 1
3 | **Oklahoma** | **3** | 7 | **2**

=== Finals ===
National championship
| Auburn | v. | Oklahoma |

==== Game 1 ====
June 6, 2016 – 7:00 p.m. (CDT) at ASA Hall of Fame Stadium in Oklahoma City, Oklahoma
| Team | 1 | 2 | 3 | 4 | 5 | 6 | 7 | R | H | E |
|---|---|---|---|---|---|---|---|---|---|---|
| Auburn | 0 | 0 | 0 | 0 | 0 | 0 | 2 | **2** | **4** | **0** |
| **Oklahoma** | 0 | 0 | 3 | 0 | 0 | 0 | x | **3** | **7** | **1** |
WP: Paige Parker (37–3) LP: Lexi Davis (6–1); Home runs: AUB: Jade Rhodes; OKLA: Sydney Romero; Attendance: 8,171; Boxscore

==== Game 2 ====
June 7, 2016 – 7:00 p.m. CDT at ASA Hall of Fame Stadium in Oklahoma City, Oklahoma
| Team | 1 | 2 | 3 | 4 | 5 | 6 | 7 | 8 | R | H | E |
|---|---|---|---|---|---|---|---|---|---|---|---|
| Oklahoma | 1 | 6 | 0 | 0 | 0 | 0 | 0 | 0 | **7** | **10** | **2** |
| **Auburn** | 0 | 5 | 0 | 2 | 0 | 0 | 0 | 4 | **11** | **13** | **2** |
WP: Makayla Martin (15–3) LP: Jayden Chestnut (9–1); Home runs: OKLA: Kady Self; AUB: Whitney Jordan, Kasey Cooper, Emily Carosone; Attendance: 8,409; Boxscore

==== Game 3 ====
June 8, 2016 – 6:00 p.m. CDT at ASA Hall of Fame Stadium in Oklahoma City, Oklahoma
| Team | 1 | 2 | 3 | 4 | 5 | 6 | 7 | R | H | E |
|---|---|---|---|---|---|---|---|---|---|---|
| Auburn | 0 | 0 | 0 | 1 | 0 | 0 | 0 | **1** | **5** | **2** |
| **Oklahoma** | 2 | 0 | 0 | 0 | 0 | 0 | x | **2** | **5** | **1** |
WP: Paige Parker (38–3) LP: Makayla Martin (15–4); Home runs: AUB: Jade Rhodes; OKLA: None; Attendance: 8,367

== Record by conference ==
| Conference | # of Bids | Record | Win % | RF | SR | WS | NS | CS | NC |
|---|---|---|---|---|---|---|---|---|---|
| Big 12 | 4 | 14–7 | .667 | 3 | 1 | 1 | 1 | 1 | 1 |
| Southeastern | 11 | 41–22 | .651 | 11 | 6 | 4 | 2 | 1 | – |
| Atlantic Coast | 4 | 8–7 | .533 | 2 | 1 | 1 | 1 | – | – |
| Pac-12 | 8 | 23–16 | .590 | 7 | 5 | 1 | – | – | – |
| Big Ten | 6 | 12–10 | .545 | 3 | 1 | 1 | – | – | – |
| Sun Belt | 2 | 4–4 | .500 | 1 | 1 | – | – | – | – |
| CAA | 1 | 4–2 | .667 | 1 | 1 | – | – | – | – |
| American | 3 | 3–7 | .300 | 1 | – | – | – | – | – |
| Big West | 2 | 3–4 | .429 | 1 | – | – | – | – | – |
| Other | 23 | 11–44 | .200 | 2 | – | – | – | – | – |

The columns RF, SR, WS, NS, CS, and NC respectively stand for the Regional Finals, Super Regionals, College World Series Teams, National Semi-Finals, Championship Series, and National Champion.

== Media coverage ==
=== Radio ===
Westwood One provided nationwide radio coverage of the championship series. It was streamed online at westwoodsports.com and through TuneIn. Kevin Kugler and Leah Amico provided the call for Westwood One.

=== Television ===
ESPN holds exclusive rights to the tournament. They aired games across ESPN, ESPN2, and ESPNU. Select regionals and super-regionals were broadcast on additional ESPN stations like SEC Network, ESPN3, SEC Network Plus, and Longhorn Network. Any regionals not picked up by ESPN were streamed online by the host institution or broadcast by their television partners.

==== Broadcast assignments ====
Regionals

- Columbia: Pam Ward & Cheri Kempf
- Gainesville: Trey Bender & Jennie Ritter
- Tallahassee: Melissa Lee & Leah Ross
- Tuscaloosa: Cara Capuano & Leah Amico
- Knoxville: Beth Mowins & Michele Smith
- Auburn: Tiffany Greene & Jenny Dalton-Hill
- Lafayette: Adam Amin & Amanda Scarborough (ESPN Nets)
  Tyler Denning & Megan Willis (LHN)
- Norman: Jenn Hildreth & Carol Bruggeman
- Eugene: Mark Neely & Danielle Lawrie
- Athens: Kaleb Frady & Natalie Kerns
- Baton Rouge: Lyn Rollins & Yvette Girouard
- Lexington: Dave Baker & Dorian Craft (Fri) or Ginny Carroll (Sat/Sun)
- Ann Arbor: Lisa Byington & Stacey Phillips (BTN)
- Harrisonburg: Curt Dudley & Kim Fucci (Madizone HD SN)
- Seattle: Mike Brown (P12 WASH)
- Los Angeles- No commentary (P12 UCLA)

Super Regionals

- Gainesville: Trey Bender & Jennie Ritter
- Norman: Adam Amin & Amanda Scarborough
- Harrisonburg: Jenn Hildreth & Carol Bruggeman
- Tallahassee: Cara Capuano & Leah Amico
- Tuscaloosa: Beth Mowins, Michele Smith, & Jessica Mendoza
- Ann Arbor: Pam Ward & Cheri Kempf
- Auburn: Tiffany Greene & Jenny Dalton-Hill
- Eugene: Mark Neely & Danielle Lawrie

Women's College World Series

- Adam Amin, Amanda Scarborough, & Laura Rutledge (afternoons)
- Beth Mowins, Jessica Mendoza, Michele Smith, & Holly Rowe (evenings & championship series)
