= Paige Halstead =

American softball player

- Outfielder / Catcher
- Born: April 17, 1997 (age 29); Upland, California, U.S.
- Bats: Left Throws: Right

Teams
- UCLA Bruins (2016–2019); United States National Team (2016–2018); Athletes Unlimited Softball (2020–present)

Kathryn Paige Halstead (born April 17, 1997) is an American softball player for Athletes Unlimited Softball and a former UCLA Bruin.

== Early life ==
Halstead was born in Upland, California to parents Mari and Ed Halstead. She attended Los Osos High School in Rancho Cucamonga, California from where she graduated in 2015, and hit .568 as a senior.

== UCLA Bruins ==
Halstead signed with the UCLA Bruins prior to the 2016 season. She graduated in 2019.

=== Stats ===
Year	G	AB	R	H	BA	RBI	HR	3B	2B	SLG	BB	SO
2016	57	166	18	48	.289	28	4	2	8	.434	10	22
2017	63	184	24	51	.277	21	6	1	4	.408	12	29
2018	48	89	7	18	.202	10	1	2	2	.303	14	28
2019	45	69	5	19	.275	12	2	0	6	.449	7	16

== International career ==
Halstead was selected to represent the United States at the 2016 World Cup of Softball, where the team won a Silver Medal. She hit .273 in the tournament with a Home Run and 5 RBIs.

=== Stats ===
Year	G	AB	R	H	BA	RBI	HR	3B	2B	SLG	BB	SO
2016	4	8	1	4	.500	3	0	0	2	.750%	0	1
