= 2016 Louisiana–Lafayette Ragin' Cajuns softball team =

American college softball season

2016 Louisiana–Lafayette Ragin' Cajuns softball

Norman Super Regionals appearance Lafayette Regionals champions Sun Belt Conference tournament champions Sun Belt Conference regular-season champions

Sand Dollar Classic Champions Louisiana Classic Champions Ragin' Cajun Invitational Champions
- Conference: Sun Belt Conference

Ranking
- Coaches: No. 12
- Record: 46-9 (21-2 SBC)
- Head coach: Michael Lotief (16th season)
- Assistant coaches: Chris Malveaux; Lana Bowers
- Home stadium: Lamson Park

2016 Sun Belt Conference softball standings
	Conf.				Overall
Team	W		L	PCT	W		L	PCT
No. 12 Louisiana–Lafayette ‍†‍‡‍^{y}	21	–	2	.913	46	–	9	.836
South Alabama ‍‍‍	17	–	6	.739	33	–	18	.647
Texas State ‍‍‍^{y}	15	–	9	.625	40	–	22	.645
Georgia State ‍‍‍	13	–	11	.542	33	–	28	.541
Georgia Southern ‍‍‍	13	–	11	.542	30	–	27	.526
Troy ‍‍‍	11	–	13	.458	31	–	25	.554
UT Arlington ‍‍‍	8	–	16	.333	29	–	20	.592
Louisiana–Monroe ‍‍‍	7	–	17	.292	24	–	34	.414
Appalachian State ‍‍‍	2	–	22	.083	11	–	45	.196
‡ – Tournament champion As of March 18, 2019; Rankings from NFCA

The 2016 Louisiana–Lafayette Ragin' Cajuns softball team represented the University of Louisiana at Lafayette in the 2016 NCAA Division I softball season. The Ragin' Cajuns played their home games at Lamson Park and were led by sixteenth year head coach Michael Lotief.

== Preseason ==
=== Sun Belt Conference Coaches Poll ===
The Sun Belt Conference Coaches Poll was released on January 26, 2016. Louisiana-Lafayette was picked to finish first in the Sun Belt Conference with 98 votes and 8 first place votes.

Coaches poll
Predicted finish	Team	Votes (1st place)
1	Louisiana-Lafayette	98 (8)
2	South Alabama	90 (1)
3	Georgia State	74
4	Texas State	71
5	Troy	66
6	Louisiana-Monroe	56
7	UT Arlington	46
8	Georgia Southern	38
9	Appalachian State	28

=== Preseason All-Sun Belt team ===
- Devin Brown (USA, SO, Pitcher)
- Randi Rupp (TXST, SO, Pitcher)
- Lexi Elkins (ULL, SR, Catcher)
- Kelsey Vincent (ULL, SR, 1st Base)
- Haley Hayden (ULL, JR, 2nd Base)
- DJ Sanders (ULL, SO, Shortstop)
- Emily Messer (USA, SR, 3rd Base)
- Stephanie Pilkington (USA, SR, Outfielder)
- Shellie Landry (ULL, SR, Outfielder)
- Rochelle Roberts (ULM, JR, Outfield)
- Mya Anderson (UTA, SR, Designated Player)
- Ivie Drake (GSU, SO, At-Large)
- Kendall Wiley (TXST, SR, At-Large)
- Taylor Anderson (GSU, SR, At-Large)
- Taylor Rogers (GASO, JR, At-Large)

==== Preseason Student-Athlete of the Year ====
- Lexie Elkins (ULL, SR, Catcher)'

== Roster ==
2016 Louisiana-Lafayette Ragin' Cajuns roster
Pitchers: 9 Summer Ellyson - Freshman; 10 Alison Deville - Redshirt Freshman; 11 Kylee Jo Trahan - Sophomore; 18 Alex Stewart - Junior; 24 Macey Smith - Junior; 32 Victoria Brown - Redshirt Junior; Catchers: 23 Brittany Nollkamper - Freshman; 26 Allie Medlin - Redshirt Freshman; 33 Lexie Elkins - Senior; 34 Miranda Grotenhuis - Redshirt Freshman; Designated Players: 25 Sara Corbello - Senior; Utility Players: 2 Jaime Landry - Redshirt Freshman; 12 Gabby Felps - Senior; 19 Lexie Comeaux - Redshirt Freshman	Infielders: 00 Katie Repole - Junior; 5 Megan Thomas - Senior; 7 Alaina Guarino - Freshman; 21 Samantha Walsh - Senior; 28 Kelsey Vincent - Senior; 31 Corin Voinche - Junior; 35 Haley Hayden - Junior; 37 DJ Sanders - Sophomore; 39 Kara Gremillion - Freshman; 42 Abby Sterling - Redshirt Freshman; Outfielders: 1 Chelsea Lotief - Freshman; 3 Taylor Terrio - Junior; 4 Kassidy Zeringue - Junior; 6 Shannon Theriot - Freshman; 8 Aleah Craighton - Sophomore; 20 Kendall Smith - Junior; 22 Shellie Landry - Senior; 27 Sarah Arceneaux - Junior; 29 Beth Ashley - Freshman; 30 Kelli Martinez - Sophomore

=== Coaching staff ===
2017 Louisiana-Lafayette Ragin' Cajuns coaching staff
- Michael Lotief – Head coach – 16th year
- Chris Malveaux – Associate head coach – 4th year
- Lana Bowers – Assistant head coach - 3rd year
- Kate Malveaux - Director of operations
- Sarah Draheim – Manager
- Leandra Maly - Manager
- Katy Akins – Manager
- Cade Romero - Manager

== Schedule and results ==
Legend
	Louisiana-Lafayette win
	Louisiana-Lafayette loss
	Postponement/Cancellation
**Bold**	Louisiana team member

2016 Louisiana-Lafayette Ragin' Cajuns Softball Game Log
Regular season (40-7)

February (14-1)
Date	Opponent	Rank	Site/stadium	Score	Win	Loss	Save	TV	Attendance	Overall record	SBC record
Sand Dollar Classic
Feb. 12	Ball State	No. 11	Gulf Shores Sportsplex (Field 5) • Gulf Shores, AL	**W** 22-4 (5 inn)	**Brown** (1-0)	Wilmes (0-1)	None	None		1-0	
Feb. 12	UAB	No. 11	Gulf Shores Sportsplex (Field 5) • Gulf Shores, AL	**W** 15-0 (5 inn)	**Stewart** (1-0)	Smith (0-1)	None	None		2-0	
Feb. 13	Southeast Missouri State	No. 11	Gulf Shores Sportsplex (Field 3) • Gulf Shores, AL	**W** 8-0 (5 inn)	**Stewart** (2-0)	Hoelting (0-1)	None	None		3-0	
Feb. 13	Samford	No. 11	Gulf Shores Sportsplex (Field 5) • Gulf Shores, AL	**W** 1-0	**Trahan** (1-0)	Hanson (1-1)	None	None		4-0	
Feb. 14	Louisiana Tech	No. 11	Gulf Shores Sportsplex (Field 1) • Gulf Shores, AL	**W** 8-2	**Stewart** (3-0)	Allen (1-2)	None	None		5-0	
Louisiana Classics
Feb. 19	No. 5 Oregon	No. 7	Lamson Park • Lafayette, LA	**W** 3-2	**Stewart** (4-0)	Kleist (3-1)	None	Ragin' Cajuns Digital Network		6-0	
Feb. 19	No. 5 Oregon	No. 7	Lamson Park • Lafayette, LA	**L** 3-6	Hawkins (3-1)	**Trahan** (1-1)	None	Ragin' Cajuns Digital Network	2,273	6-1	
Feb. 20	No. 5 Oregon	No. 7	Lamson Park • Lafayette, LA	**W** 5-4	**Stewart** (5-0)	Hawkins (3-2)	None	Ragin' Cajuns Digital Network	2,315	7-1	
Feb. 21	Central Arkansas	No. 7	Lamson Park • Lafayette, LA	**W** 11-1 (5 inn)	**Trahan** (2-1)	Landeros (3-3)	None	Ragin' Cajuns Digital Network	1,592	8-1	
Feb. 25	Texas Tech	No. 6	Lamson Park • Lafayette, LA	**W** 6-2	**Stewart** (6-0)	Powell (2-3)	None	Ragin' Cajuns Digital Network		9-1	
Feb. 25	Texas Tech	No. 6	Lamson Park • Lafayette, LA	**W** 11-5	**Stewart** (7-0)	Alcocer (1-5)	None	Ragin' Cajuns Digital Network	1,485	10-1	
Ragin' Cajuns Invitational
Feb. 26	Rutgers	No. 6	Lamson Park • Lafayette, LA	**W** 12-0 (5 inn)	**Trahan** (3-1)	Maddox (0-4)	None	Ragin' Cajuns Digital Network	1,362	11-1	
Feb. 27	Rutgers	No. 6	Lamson Park • Lafayette, LA	**W** 8-0 (6 inn)	**Smith** (1-0)	Levine (0-3)	None	Ragin' Cajuns Digital Network		12-1	
Feb. 27	Alcorn State	No. 6	Lamson Park • Lafayette, LA	**W** 12-0 (5 inn)	**Trahan** (4-1)	Breal (0-1)	None	Ragin' Cajuns Digital Network	1,733	13-1	
Feb. 28	Alcorn State	No. 6	Lamson Park • Lafayette, LA	**W** 9-0 (5 inn)	**Brown** (2-0)	Castillo (0-1)	None	Ragin' Cajuns Digital Network	1,449	14-1	

March (12-2)
Date	Opponent	Rank	Site/stadium	Score	Win	Loss	Save	TV	Attendance	Overall record	SBC record
Mar. 5	at Southern Miss	No. 5	USM Softball Complex • Hattiesburg, MS	**W** 17-1 (5 inn)	**Stewart** (8-0)	Robles (7-3)	None	None		15-1	
Mar. 5	at Southern Miss	No. 5	USM Softball Complex • Hattiesburg, MS	**W** 13-0 (5 inn)	**Trahan** (5-1)	Block (3-3)	None	None	760	16-1	
Mar. 6	at Southern Miss	No. 5	USM Softball Complex • Hattiesburg, MS	**W** 6-2	**Trahan** (6-1)	Robles (7-4)	None	None	673	17-1	
Mar. 9	Longwood	No. 5	Lamson Park • Lafayette, LA	Game Cancelled due to impending inclement weather and severe weather concerns in Lafayette, LA							
Mar. 12	South Alabama	No. 5	Lamson Park • Lafayette, LA	Game Cancelled due to impending inclement weather and severe weather concerns in Lafayette, LA							
Mar. 13	South Alabama	No. 5	Lamson Park • Lafayette, LA	**W** 3-2	**Stewart** (9-0)	Brown (5-6)	None	Ragin' Cajuns Digital Network		18-1	1-0
Mar. 13	South Alabama	No. 5	Lamson Park • Lafayette, LA	**W** 10-6	**Trahan** (7-1)	Vicknair (5-3)	None	Ragin' Cajuns Digital Network	1,937	19-1	2-0
Mar. 16	McNeese State	No. 5	Lamson Park • Lafayette, LA	**W** 5-4 (9 inn)	**Trahan** (8-1)	Vincent (5-2)	None	Ragin' Cajuns Digital Network	1,981	20-1	
Mar. 19	at UT Arlington	No. 5	Allan Saxe Field • Arlington, TX	**W** 13-0 (5 inn)	**Stewart** (10-0)	Clakley (11-2)	None	None		21-1	3-0
Mar. 19	at UT Arlington	No. 5	Allan Saxe Field • Arlington, TX	**W** 16-0	**Trahan** (9-1)	Montes (5-1)	None	None		22-1	4-0
Mar. 20	at UT Arlington	No. 5	Allan Saxe Field • Arlington, TX	**L** 1-3	Clakley (12-2)	**Trahan** (9-2)	None	None	340	22-2	4-1
Mar. 25	at Troy	No. 5	Troy Softball Complex • Troy, AL	**W** 11-0	**Stewart** (11-0)	Rainey (11-5)	None	None		23-2	5-1
Mar. 25	at Troy	No. 5	Troy Softball Complex • Troy, AL	**W** 8-1	**Trahan** (10-2)	Glover 5-1	None	None	607	24-2	6-1
Mar. 26	at Troy	No. 5	Troy Softball Complex • Troy, AL	**W** 8-0 (5 inn)	**Stewart** (12-0)	Rainey (11-8)	None	None	358	25-2	7-1
Mar. 29	at No. 19 Baylor	No. 4	Getterman Stadium • Waco, TX	**L** 0-2	Stearns (13-2)	**Stewart** (12-1)	None	FOX Sports+		25-3	
Mar. 29	at No. 19 Baylor	No. 4	Getterman Stadium • Waco, TX	**W** 4-3	**Stewart** (13-1)	Potts (10-1)	None	FOX Sports+	970	26-3	

April (11-3)
Date	Opponent	Rank	Site/stadium	Score	Win	Loss	Save	TV	Attendance	Overall record	SBC record
Apr. 2	Texas State	No. 4	Lamson Park • Lafayette, LA	**W** 7-0	**Stewart** (14-1)	Rupp (16-7)	None	MyAcadianaTV/ESPN3		27-3	8-1
Apr. 2	Texas State	No. 4	Lamson Park • Lafayette, LA	**W** 5-2	**Smith** (2-0)	Williams (5-3)	**Trahan** (1)	MyAcadianaTV/ESPN3	1,701	28-3	9-1
Apr. 3	Texas State	No. 4	Lamson Park • Lafayette, LA	**W** 3-0	**Stewart** (15-1)	Rupp (16-8)	None	Ragin' Cajuns Digital Network	1,524	29-3	10-1
Apr. 9	at Georgia State	No. 5	Robert E. Heck Softball Complex • Atlanta, GA	**W** 4-1	**Stewart** (16-1)	Worley (8-7)	None			30-3	11-1
Apr. 9	at Georgia State	No. 5	Robert E. Heck Softball Complex • Atlanta, GA	**W** 6-5	**Brown** (3-0)	Chance (5-3)	None		293	31-3	12-1
Apr. 10	at Georgia State	No. 5	Robert E. Heck Softball Complex • Atlanta, GA	**W** 12-0 (5 inn)	**Stewart** (17-1)	Davis (4-6)	None		281	32-3	13-1
Apr. 16	at No. 1 Florida	No. 5	Katie Seashole Pressly Softball Stadium • Gainesville, FL	**L** 1-5	Gourley (12-2)	**Stewart** (17-2)	None	SECN+		32-4	
Apr. 16	at No. 1 Florida	No. 5	Katie Seashole Pressly Softball Stadium • Gainesville, FL	**L** 1-14 (5 inn)	Ocasio (14-1)	**Trahan** (10-3)	None	SECN+	1,059	32-5	
Apr. 17	at No. 1 Florida	No. 5	Katie Seashole Pressly Softball Stadium • Gainesville, FL	**L** 0-3	Gourley (13-2)	**Stewart** (17-3)	None	SECN+	1,143	32-6	
Apr. 20	at McNeese State	No. 7	Joe Miller Field at Cowgirl Diamond • Lake Charles, LA	Originally scheduled to be postponed due to inclement weather, the game was cancelled							
Apr. 23	Appalachian State	No. 7	Lamson Park • Lafayette, LA	**W** 13-4 (5 inn)	**Stewart** (18-3)	Kennedy (2-15)	None	MyAcadianaTV/ESPN3		33-6	14-1
Apr. 23	Appalachian State	No. 7	Lamson Park • Lafayette, LA	**W** 14-2 (5 inn)	**Stewart** (19-3)	Ciocatto (7-18)	None	MyAcadianaTV/ESPN3	1,610	34-6	15-1
Apr. 24	Appalachian State	No. 7	Lamson Park • Lafayette, LA	**W** 14-0 (5 inn)	**Stewart** (20-3)	Eosso (0-3)	None	Ragin' Cajuns Digital Network	1,463	35-6	16-1
Apr. 30	at Georgia Southern	No. 8	Eagle Field at GS Softball Complex • Statesboro, GA	**W** 5-0	**Stewart** (21-3)	Raley (21-11)	None	None		36-6	17-1
Apr. 30	at Georgia Southern	No. 8	Eagle Field at GS Softball Complex • Statesboro, GA	**W** 12-1 (6 inn)	**Stewart** (22-3)	Camp (6-11)	None	None	224	37-6	18-1

May (3-1)
Date	Opponent	Rank	Site/stadium	Score	Win	Loss	Save	TV	Attendance	Overall record	SBC record
May 1	at Georgia Southern	No. 8	Eagle Field at GS Softball Complex • Statesboro, GA	**L** 0-2	Raley (22-11)	**Stewart** (22-4)	None	None	312	37-7	18-2
May 7	Louisiana-Monroe	No. 9	Lamson Park • Lafayette, LA	**W** 6-1	**Stewart** (23-4)	Porter (3-7)	**Smith** (1)	MyAcadianaTV/ESPN3		38-7	19-2
May 7	Louisiana-Monroe	No. 9	Lamson Park • Lafayette, LA	**W** 5-0	**Stewart** (24-4)	Coyne (17-20)	None	MyAcadianaTV/ESPN3	1,774	39-7	20-2
May 8	Louisiana-Monroe	No. 9	Lamson Park • Lafayette, LA	**W** 8-0 (6 inn)	**Stewart** (25-4)	Coyne (17-21)	None	Ragin' Cajuns Digital Network	1,587	40-7	21-2

Post-Season (6-2)

SBC tournament (3-0)
Date	Opponent	Seed/rank	Site/stadium	Score	Win	Loss	Save	TV	Attendance	Overall record	SBC record
May 12	vs. Georgia State	No. 9	Jaguar Field • Mobile, AL	**W** 13-1 (5 inn)	**Stewart** (26-4)	Chance (7-7)	None	None	781	41-7	
May 13	vs. Texas State	No. 9	Jaguar Field • Mobile, AL	**W** 9-7	**Stewart** (27-4)	Rupp (28-11)	**Smith** (2)	ESPN3	684	42-7	
May 14	vs. Texas State	No. 9	Jaguar Field • Mobile, Al	**W** 12-0 (5 inn)	**Smith** (3-0)	Rupp (29-12)	None	ESPN3	437	43-7	

NCAA Division I Baseball Championship (3-2)
Date	Opponent	Seed/rank	Site/stadium	Score	Win	Loss	Save	TV	Attendance	Overall record	SBC record
Lafayette Regionals
May 20	vs. Boston University	No. 9	Lamson Park • Lafayette, LA	**W** 9-5	**Smith** (4-0)	Russell (14-10)	**Brown** (1)	ESPNU	1,638	44-7	
May 21	vs. No. 25 Texas	No. 9	Lamson Park • Lafayette, LA	**W** 9-1	**Stewart** (28-4)	Davis (23-10)	None	ESPN	1,709	45-7	
May 22	vs. No. 16 Texas A&M	No. 9	Lamson Park • Lafayette, LA	**W** 9-8 (9 inn)	**Stewart** (29-4)	Show (25-10)	None	ESPNU	2,130	46-7	
Norman Super Regionals
May 26	at No. 3 Oklahoma	No. 14	OU Softball Complex • Norman, OK	**L** 2-8	Parker (32-3)	**Stewart** (29-5)	None	ESPN2	1,633	46-8	
May 27	at No. 3 Oklahoma	No. 14	OU Softball Complex • Norman, OK	**L** 6-7	Parker (33-3)	**Stewart** (29-6)	None	ESPNU	1,641	46-9	

Schedule source:

== Lafayette Regional ==
Lafayette Regional Teams
(1) Louisiana–Lafayette Ragin' Cajuns	(2) Texas Longhorns	(3) Texas A&M Aggies	(4) Boston University Terriers

First Round
14	Louisiana–Lafayette	9
Boston U.	5
Texas	5
Texas A&M	0
Lower round 1
Texas A&M	6
Boston U.	0

Semi-Finals
Texas	1
14	Louisiana-Lafayette	9
Lower final
Texas	3
Texas A&M	9

Finals
14	Louisiana-Lafayette	9	–
Texas A&M	8	–

== Norman Super Regional ==
Norman Super Regional Teams
(1) Oklahoma Sooners	(2) Louisiana–Lafayette Ragin' Cajuns

Game 1
Rank	Team	Score
14	Louisiana-Lafayette	2
3	Oklahoma	8

Game 2
Rank	Team	Score
14	Louisiana-Lafayette	6
3	Oklahoma	7
