= 2016 Alabama Crimson Tide softball team =

American college softball season

2016 Alabama Crimson Tide softball

Women's College World Series, T-7th
- Conference: Southeastern Conference
- West
- Record: 51–14 (16–8 SEC)
- Head coach: Patrick Murphy
- Assistant coach: Alyson Habetz
- Pitching coach: Stephanie VanBrakle
- Home stadium: Rhoads Stadium

2016 Southeastern Conference softball standings
	Conf.				Overall
Team	W		L	PCT	W		L	PCT
No. 1 Florida ‍‍‍	20	–	4	.833	52	–	4	.929
No. 12 Kentucky ‍‍‍	17	–	7	.708	43	–	11	.796
No. 10 Tennessee ‍‍‍	16	–	7	.696	40	–	13	.755
No. 6 Auburn ‍‍‡‍	16	–	7	.696	46	–	9	.836
No. 4 Alabama ‍‍‍	16	–	8	.667	45	–	11	.804
No. 16 Missouri ‍‍‍	14	–	10	.583	39	–	13	.750
No. 13 LSU ‍‍‍	13	–	11	.542	42	–	14	.750
No. 15 Georgia ‍‍‍	12	–	12	.500	40	–	16	.714
Ole Miss ‍‍‍	11	–	13	.458	38	–	19	.667
No. 17 Texas A&M ‍‍‍	9	–	15	.375	37	–	17	.685
South Carolina ‍‍‍	7	–	17	.292	35	–	20	.636
Mississippi State ‍‍‍	3	–	21	.125	25	–	30	.455
Arkansas ‍‍‍	1	–	23	.042	17	–	39	.304
‡ – Tournament champion As of May 8, 2016; Rankings from NFCA

The 2016 Alabama Crimson Tide softball team was an American softball team that represented the University of Alabama for the 2016 NCAA softball season. The Crimson Tide played their home games at Rhoads Stadium. After losing in the 2015 Women's College World Series, the 2016 team looked to make the postseason for the 18th straight year, and the Women's College World Series for eleventh time. This season represented the 20th season of softball in the school's history.

== Personnel ==
=== Roster ===
2016 Alabama Crimson Tide roster
Pitchers: 25 Madi Moore – Freshman; 27 Alexis Osorio – Sophomore; 28 Sydney Littlejohn – Junior; Outfielders: 4 Rachel Bobo – Sophomore; 7 Merris Schroder – Freshman; 8 Haylie McCleney – Senior; 10 Mari Cranek – Freshman; 18 Andrea Hawkins – Senior	Catchers: 20 Carrigan Fain – Sophomore; 54 Reagan Dykes – Freshman; Infielders: 2 Demi Turner – Sophomore; 3 Peyton Grantham – Sophomore; 6 Sydney Booker – Sophomore; 9 Marisa Runyon – Junior; 24 Leona Lafaele – Senior; Utility: 5 Chandler Dare – Junior; 12 Kallie Case – Senior; 34 Caroline Hardy – Freshman

2016 Alabama Crimson Tide Softball Roster

=== Coaching staff ===
2016 Alabama Crimson Tide softball coaching staff
- Patrick Murphy – Head coach – 18th year
- Alyson Habetz – Associate head coach hitting coach – 18th year
- Stephanie VanBrakle – Assistant coach, pitching coach – 5th year
- Adam Arbour – Volunteer assistant coach – 5th year
- Kate Harris – Director of operations- 6th year
- Erin Weaver – Athletic trainer

== Schedule ==
Date	Time	Opponent	Rank^{#}	Site	Result	Attendance	Winning Pitcher	Losing Pitcher
UCF Classic
February 12*	1:00 PM	Fordham	#5	UCF Softball Complex • Orlando, FL	W 9–1^{(5)}	–	M. Moore	L. Quense
February 12*	5:30 PM	#17 UCF	#5	UCF Softball Complex • Orlando, FL	L 1–8	787	S. Turnier	S. Littlejohn
February 13*	11:00 AM	Rutgers	#5	UCF Softball Complex • Orlando, FL	W 6–0	–	M. Moore	A. Levine
February 13*	3:30 PM	#19 James Madison	#5	UCF Softball Complex • Orlando, FL	W 2–1	758	A. Osorio	M. Good
February 14*	8:00 AM	Liberty	#5	UCF Softball Complex • Orlando, FL	W 10–2^{(6)}	–	S. Littlejohn	C. Cassady
February 16*	6:00 PM	UAB	#5	UAB Softball Field • Birmingham, AL	W 7–0^{(6)}	832	M. Moore	M. Hir
Panther Invitational
February 19*	9:00 AM	Miami (OH)	#5	Heck Softball Complex • Atlanta, GA	W 10–2^{(6)}	321	M. Moore	A. Logemann
February 19*	11:30 AM	Maryland	#5	Heck Softball Complex • Atlanta, GA	W 1–0	280	S. Littlejohn	H. Dewey
February 20*	9:00 AM	Mercer	#5	Heck Softball Complex • Atlanta, GA	W 7–0	535	A. Osorio	M. Rodriguez
February 20*	11:30 AM	Georgia St.	#5	Heck Softball Complex • Atlanta, GA	W 9–0^{(6)}	866	S. Littlejohn	T. Thorpe
February 21*	9:00 AM	Maryland	#5	Heck Softball Complex • Atlanta, GA	W 10–5	236	M. Moore	B. Nation
February 24*	5:00 PM	Troy	#4	Rhoads Stadium • Tuscaloosa, AL	W 8–0^{(5)}	2,383	S. Littlejohn	A. Rainey
Easton Bama Bash
February 26*	6:00 PM	#15 Arizona	#4	Rhoads Stadium • Tuscaloosa, AL	W 4–3	2,653	A. Osorio	D. O'Toole
February 27*	1:30 PM	#15 Arizona	#4	Rhoads Stadium • Tuscaloosa, AL	W 9–1^{(6)}	–	S. Littlejohn	T. McQuillin
February 27*	3:30 PM	Marshall	#4	Rhoads Stadium • Tuscaloosa, AL	W 4–2	3,491	A. Osorio	J. Dixon
February 28*	1:00 PM	#14 Tennessee	#4	Rhoads Stadium • Tuscaloosa, AL	W 6–5	3,363	A. Osorio	M. Moss
March 2*	5:00 PM	Jacksonville St.	#4	University Field • Jacksonville, AL	W 10–3	5,062	S. Littlejohn	K. Titus
Easton Crimson Classic
March 4*	4:00 PM	Louisiana–Monroe	#4	Rhoads Stadium • Tuscaloosa, AL	W 11–0^{(5)}	–	S. Littlejohn	K. Kaminski
March 4*	6:00 PM	North Dakota St.	#4	Rhoads Stadium • Tuscaloosa, AL	W 15–2^{(5)}	2,589	A. Osorio	K. Leddy
March 5*	1:30 PM	DePaul	#4	Rhoads Stadium • Tuscaloosa, AL	W 12–4^{(5)}	–	M. Moore	M. Leyva
March 5*	4:00 PM	North Dakota St.	#4	Rhoads Stadium • Tuscaloosa, AL	L 1–2	3,280	J. Sertic	S. Littlejohn
March 6*	1:30 PM	Louisiana–Monroe	#4	Rhoads Stadium • Tuscaloosa, AL	W 5–0	2,738	A. Osorio	M. Coyne
March 8*	7:30 PM	Samford	#6	Rhoads Stadium • Tuscaloosa, AL	W 10–0^{(5)}	2,591	S. Littlejohn	M. Hanson
March 11	6:00 PM	#4 LSU	#6	Tiger Park • Baton Rouge, LA	L 2–6	1,801	C. Hoover	A. Osorio
March 12	5:00 PM	#4 LSU	#6	Tiger Park • Baton Rouge, LA	W 10–3	2,450	S. Littlejohn	S. Smith
March 13	2:00 PM	#4 LSU	#6	Tiger Park • Baton Rouge, LA	L 1–8	2,767	C. Hoover	A. Osorio
Easton Tournament
March 17*	7:30 PM	Cal State Fullerton	#6	Anderson Field • Fullerton, CA	W 2–1	404	A. Osorio	S. Golden
March 18*	1:00 PM	Grand Canyon	#6	Anderson Field • Fullerton, CA	W 9–0^{(5)}	345	M. Moore	B. Bergman
March 18*	3:30 PM	New Mexico	#6	Anderson Field • Fullerton, CA	W 6–1	223	S. Littlejohn	L. Soles
March 19*	12:30 PM	DePaul	#6	Anderson Field • Fullerton, CA	W 14–6^{(6)}	212	M. Moore	M. Leyva
March 19*	6:00 PM	#13 Oklahoma	#6	Anderson Field • Fullerton, CA	L 2–0	–	P. Parker	A. Osorio
March 22*	6:00 PM	Alcorn State	#6	Rhoads Stadium • Tuscaloosa, AL	W 8–0^{(5)}	2,598	M. Moore	A. Breal
March 26	2:00 PM	#16 Missouri	#6	Rhoads Stadium • Tuscaloosa, AL	L 7–3	–	P. Lowary	A. Osorio
March 26	4:00 PM	#16 Missouri	#6	Rhoads Stadium • Tuscaloosa, AL	W 9–1^{(5)}	3,442	S. Littlejohn	D. Baumgartner
March 28	6:00 PM	#16 Missouri	#6	Rhoads Stadium • Tuscaloosa, AL	W 16–2^{(5)}	2,870	S. Littlejohn	P. Lowary
April 1	5:00 PM	#1 Florida	#6	Pressly Stadium • Gainesville, FL	W 2–1	2,109	S. Littlejohn	D. Gourley
April 2	11:00 AM	#1 Florida	#6	Pressly Stadium • Gainesville, FL	L 2–3	2,241	K. Barnhill	A. Osorio
April 3	12:00 PM	#1 Florida	#6	Pressly Stadium • Gainesville, FL	W 3–0	2,409	S. Littlejohn	D. Gourley
April 5*	6:00 PM	MS Valley St.	#4	Rhoads Stadium • Tuscaloosa, AL	W 14–0^{(5)}	2,422	A. Osorio	M. Rivera
April 8	6:30 PM	Mississippi St.	#4	Rhoads Stadium • Tuscaloosa, AL	W 7–1	3,136	S. Littlejohn	A. Silkwood
April 9	2:00 PM	Mississippi St.	#4	Rhoads Stadium • Tuscaloosa, AL	W 8–0^{(5)}	3,564	A. Osorio	H. Ward
April 10	1:30 PM	Mississippi St.	#4	Rhoads Stadium • Tuscaloosa, AL	W 8–1	3,222	S. Littlejohn	M. Toler
April 12*	6:00 PM	Southern Miss	#4	SM Softball Complex • Hattiesburg, MS	W 7–1	1,160	A. Osorio	D. Block
April 15	6:30 PM	#16 Texas A&M	#4	Aggie SB Complex • College Station, TX	W 8–3	1,451	S. Littlejohn	S. Show
April 16	3:00 PM	#16 Texas A&M	#4	Aggie SB Complex • College Station, TX	W 8–7	1,788	A. Osorio	T. Harrington
April 17	1:00 PM	#16 Texas A&M	#4	Aggie SB Complex • College Station, TX	L 14–1^{(5)}	1,518	S. Show	S. Littlejohn
April 20*	6:00 PM	South Alabama	#4	Rhoads Stadium • Tuscaloosa, AL	W 4–2	2,809	S. Littlejohn	D. Vicknair
April 22	6:30 PM	#11 Kentucky	#4	Rhoads Stadium • Tuscaloosa, AL	L 2–3	2,957	K. Nunley	S. Littlejohn
April 23	5:00 PM	#11 Kentucky	#4	Rhoads Stadium • Tuscaloosa, AL	W 7–1	3,580	A. Osorio	M. Prince
April 24	1:30 PM	#11 Kentucky	#4	Rhoads Stadium • Tuscaloosa, AL	W 3–0	3,548	S. Littlejohn	K. Nunley
April 29	5:00 PM	South Carolina	#4	Beckham Field • Columbia, SC	W 3–1	1,480	S. Littlejohn	J. Elliott
April 30	11:00 AM	South Carolina	#4	Beckham Field • Columbia, SC	L 1–2	1,480	J. Elliott	A. Osorio
May 1	12:00 PM	South Carolina	#4	Beckham Field • Columbia, SC	W 5–1^{(5)}	1,480	S. Littlejohn	J. Elliott
May 6	6:30 PM	#15 Georgia	#4	Rhoads Stadium • Tuscaloosa, AL	W 7–2	3,273	S. Littlejohn	C. Wilkinson
May 7	11:00 AM	#15 Georgia	#4	Rhoads Stadium • Tuscaloosa, AL	W 9–7	3,781	A. Osorio	B. Gray
May 8	1:30 PM	#15 Georgia	#4	Rhoads Stadium • Tuscaloosa, AL	L 5–9	3,725	C. Wilkinson	S. Littlejohn
SEC softball tournament
May 11	6:30 PM	Mississippi St.	#4	Nusz Park • Starkville, MS	W 7–5	1,517	A. Osorio	A. Silkwood
May 12	6:30 PM	#8 Auburn	#4	Nusz Park • Starkville, MS	L 4–6	2,213	R. Walters	S. Littlejohn
NCAA Tuscaloosa Regional
May 20	4:00 PM	Samford	#6	Rhoads Stadium • Tuscaloosa, AL	W 3–0	1,750	A. Osorio	M. Hanson
May 21	1:30 PM	Cal	#6	Rhoads Stadium • Tuscaloosa, AL	W 3–1	1,713	S. Littlejohn	N. Ontiveros
May 22	1:30 PM	Cal	#6	Rhoads Stadium • Tuscaloosa, AL	W 8–0	1,935	A. Osorio	N. Ontiveros
NCAA Tuscaloosa Super Regional
May 27	8:00 PM	#12 Washington	#6	Rhoads Stadium • Tuscaloosa, AL	W 2–1^{(8)}	2,841	A. Osorio	T. Alvelo
May 28	4:30 PM	#12 Washington	#6	Rhoads Stadium • Tuscaloosa, AL	W 5–2	3,443	A. Osorio	T. Alvelo
NCAA Women's College World Series
June 2	6:00 PM	#3 Oklahoma	#6	ASA HoF Stadium • Oklahoma City, OK	L 2–5^{(8)}		P. Parker	A. Osorio
June 4	2:00 PM	#10 LSU	#6	ASA HoF Stadium • Oklahoma City, OK	L 4–6	8,872	C. Hoover	S. Littlejohn
*Non-Conference Game. ^{#}Rankings from NFCA released prior to game.All times are in Central Time Zone.

== Honors and awards ==
- Haylie McCleney & Alexis Osorio were selected to the Preaseson All-SEC Team.
- Alexis Osorio was selected as the SEC Pitcher of the Week, February 29.
- Sydney Littlejohn was selected as the SEC Pitcher of the Week, April 4.
- Reagan Dykes was selected as the SEC Freshman of the Week, April 4.
- Sydney Littlejohn was selected as the Louisville Slugger/NFCA National Pitcher of the Week, April 5.
- Sydney Littlejohn was selected as the ESPNW Player of the Week, April 6.

== Ranking movement ==
Poll	Pre	Wk 1	Wk 2	Wk 3	Wk 4	Wk 5	Wk 6	Wk 7	Wk 8	Wk 9	Wk 10	Wk 11	Wk 12	Wk 13	Wk 14	Final
NFCA	5	5	4	4	6	6	6	6	4	4	4	4	4	4	6	
USA Softball	5	5	4	2	4	6	8	7	4	4	4	4	4	4	6	

== See also ==
- 2016 Alabama Crimson Tide baseball team
