= 2016 BYU Cougars softball team =

American college softball season

2016 BYU Cougars softball

2016 WCC Champions

NCAA, Columbia Regional
- Conference: West Coast Conference
- Record: 35–19 (12–3 WCC)
- Head coach: Gordon Eakin (14th season)
- Assistant coaches: Pete Meredith (3rd season); Kristin Delahoussaye (3rd season)
- Home stadium: Gail Miller Field

2016 West Coast Conference softball standings
	Conf.						Overall
Team	W		L		T	PCT	W		L		T	PCT
BYU ‍†‍‍^{y}	11	–	2	–	0	.846	36	–	20	–	0	.643
Loyola Marymount ‍‍‍	10	–	5	–	0	.667	32	–	21	–	0	.604
San Diego ‍‍‍	7	–	6	–	0	.538	21	–	28	–	0	.429
Saint Mary's ‍‍‍	6	–	7	–	0	.462	19	–	26	–	1	.424
Santa Clara ‍‍‍	4	–	9	–	0	.308	9	–	40	–	0	.184
Pacific ‍‍‍	3	–	12	–	0	.200	20	–	28	–	0	.417
† – Conference champion y – Invited to the NCAA tournament As of June 17, 2016; Rankings from USA Today/NFCA Coaches

The 2016 BYU Cougars softball team represented Brigham Young University in the 2016 NCAA Division I softball season. Gordon Eakin entered the year as head coach of the Cougars for a 14th consecutive season. 2016 is the third season for the Cougars as members of the WCC in softball. The Cougars entered 2016 having won their last 7 conference championships and as the favorites in the WCC.

== 2016 roster ==
2015 BYU Cougars Roster
Pitchers: 5 McKenna Bull – junior; 7 Arianna Paulson – sophomore; 24 Olivia Sanchez – freshman; Catchers: 8 Emilee Erickson – freshman; 10 Reyna Ae – freshman; 21 Libby Sugg – freshman	Infielders: 3 Ashley Thompson – junior; 9 Lauren Bell – junior; 13 McKenzie St. Clair – junior; 16 Alexa Strid – sophomore; 18 Caitlyn Larsen – sophomore; 25 Coco Tauali'i Bond – senior; 27 Allie Hancock – freshman; 28 Courtney Kelly – freshman	Outfielders: 2 Gordy Bravo – senior; 8 Emilee Erickson – freshman; 13 McKenzie St. Clair – junior; 16 Alexa Strid – sophomore; 22 Madison Merrell – sophomore; 26 Lexi Tarrow – freshman; 27 Allie Hancock – freshman; 28 Courtney Kelly – freshman

== Schedule ==
Date	Time	Opponent	Site	Result	Attendance	Winning Pitcher	Losing Pitcher
Kajikawa Classic
February 11*	2:00 PM	San Jose State	Tempe Sports Complex • Tempe, AZ	W 8–0^{(6)}	N/A	McKenna Bull (1–0)	Katelyn Linford (0–1)
February 11*	4:30 PM	#8 Tennessee	Tempe Sports Complex • Tempe, AZ	L 3–15	206	Rainey Gaffin (1–0)	McKenna Bull (1-1)
February 12*	11:30 AM	Wisconsin	Tempe Sports Complex • Tempe, AZ	W 5–4^{(9)}	50	McKenna Bull (2–1)	Kirsten Stewart (1–1)
February 13*	9:00 AM	Creighton	Tempe Sports Complex • Tempe, AZ	W 4–0	150	Olivia Sanchez (1–0)	Micaela Whitney (0–2)
February 13*	11:30 AM	#24 Notre Dame	Tempe Sports Complex • Tempe, AZ	L 2–4^{(8)}	412	Rachel Nasland (2–0)	McKenna Bull (2–2)
Wilson/DeMari Desert Classic
February 18*	5:30 PM	Hawaiʻi	Eller Media Stadium • Las Vegas, NV	W 9–1	363	McKenna Bull (3–2)	Brittany Hitchcock (2–2)
February 19*	10:00 AM	Grand Canyon	Eller Media Stadium • Las Vegas, NV	W 4–0	267	McKenna Bull (4–2)	Bailey Bergman (2–1)
February 19*	12:15 PM	Boise State	Eller Media Stadium • Las Vegas, NV	W 8–0^{(5)}	220	Olivia Sanchez (2–0)	Nicole Wilson (0–1)
February 20*	10:00 AM	Colorado State	Eller Media Stadium • Las Vegas, NV	W 6–10^{(8)}	352	Holly Reinke (2–0)	Olivia Sanchez (2–1)
February 20*	12:15 PM	Robert Morris	Eller Media Stadium • Las Vegas, NV	W 7–2	322	McKenna Bull (5–2)	Kaitlin Ellzy (2–3)
Mary Nutter Collegiate Classic
February 25*	2:00 PM	New Mexico State	Big League Dreams Complex • Cathedral City, CA	L 1–2^{(8)}	342	Karysta Donisthrope (5–1)	McKenna Bull (5–3)
February 25*	4:30 PM	Bethune–Cookman	Big League Dreams Complex • Cathedral City, CA	W 3–0	150	Olivia Sanchez (3–1)	Deidra Genera (3–4)
February 26*	4:00 PM	#10 UCLA	Big League Dreams Complex • Cathedral City, CA	L 4–9	374	Johanna Grauer (3–2)	McKenna Bull (5–4)
February 27*	6:00 PM	Cal State Fullerton	Big League Dreams Complex • Cathedral City, CA	W 7–6	200	McKenna Bull (6–4)	Sydney Golden (5–1)
February 27*	9:00 PM	#12 Missouri	Big League Dreams Complex • Cathedral City, CA	L 6–16	85	Danielle Baumgartner (4–1)	Olivia Sanchez (3–2)
Wildcat Invitational
March 3	4:00 PM	Mount St. Mary's	Hillenbrand Stadium • Tucson, AZ	W 15–6^{(6)}	1,478	Arianna Paulson (1–0)	Erin Sweeney (0–2)
March 3*	6:00 PM	#15 Arizona	Hillenbrand Stadium • Tucson, AZ	W 4–2	1,850	McKenna Bull (7–4)	Danielle O'Toole (7–3)
March 4*	6:00 PM	#15 Arizona	Hillenbrand Stadium • Tucson, AZ	L 3–6	1,974	Danielle O'Toole (8–3)	McKenna Bull (7–5)
March 4*	8:00 PM	UTEP	Hillenbrand Stadium • Tucson, AZ	W 8–0^{(6)}	84	McKenna Bull (8–5)	Danielle Pearson (2–3)
March 5*	2:00 PM	#10 James Madison	Hillenbrand Stadium • Tucson, AZ	L 6–10	247	Megan Good (9–1)	McKenna Bull (8–6)
University of Oklahoma Tournament
March 11*	12:15 PM	Maryland	OU Softball Complex • Norman, OK	W 7–4	N/A	McKenna Bull (9–6)	Madison Martin (2–1)
March 11*	4:45 PM	#13 Oklahoma	OU Softball Complex • Norman, OK	L 0–8^{(5)}	841	Paige Parker (4–2)	McKenna Bull (9–7)
March 12*	10:00 AM	St. Louis	OU Softball Complex • Norman, OK	W 6–5	N/A	McKenna Bull (10–7)	Brianna Lore (4–4)
March 12*	2:30 PM	#13 Oklahoma	OU Softball Complex • Norman, OK	L 0–3	N/A	Paige Parker (5–2)	Olivia Sanchez (3–3)
Regular Season
March 15*	4:00 PM	Utah	Dumke Family Softball Stadium • Salt Lake City, UT	W 5–4	320	McKenna Bull (11–7)	Katie Donovan (8–6)
San Diego Classic II
March 17*	11:30 AM	Harvard	SDSU Softball Stadium • San Diego, CA	W 2–0	114	Olivia Sanchez (4–3)	Kathleen Duncan (0–1)
March 17*	2:00 PM	Long Beach State	SDSU Softball Stadium • San Diego, CA	L 0–6	129	Christina Clermont (10–2)	McKenna Bull (11–8)
March 18*	5:30 PM	#24 Fresno State	Sportsplex USA Santee • San Diego, CA	W 6–3	510	McKenna Bull (12–8)	Hannah Harris (3–4)
March 18*	8:00 PM	San Diego State	Sportsplex USA Santee • San Diego, CA	L 2–3	777	Alex Formby (5–4)	Olivia Sanchez (4–4)
March 19*	12:30 PM	UC Santa Barbara	Sportsplex USA Santee • San Diego, CA	W 8–0^{(5)}	65	McKenna Bull (13–8)	Ashley Ludlow (4–5)
Regular Season
March 22*	5:00 PM	Utah Valley	Gail Miller Field • Provo, UT	W 8–0^{(5)}	262	McKenna Bull (14–8)	Bailey Moore (2–12)
April 1*	4:00 PM	Texas	Red and Charline McCombs Field • Austin, TX	W 3–1	520	McKenna Bull (15–8)	Kristen Clark (1–1)
April 2*	5:00 PM	Texas	Red and Charline McCombs Field • Austin, TX	L 0–5	1,062	Tiarra Davis (13–7)	Olivia Sanchez (4–5)
April 2*	7:30 PM	Texas	Red and Charline McCombs Field • Austin, TX	L 0–7	1,062	Paige von Sprecken (8–1)	McKenna Bull (15–9)
April 5*	5:00 PM	Southern Utah	Gail Miller Field • Provo, UT	L 5–6^{(8)}	406	Kirsten Hostetler (3–5)	McKenna Bull (15–10)
April 5*	7:00 PM	Southern Utah	Gail Miller Field • Provo, UT	W 14–6^{(5)}	406	Olivia Sanchez (5–5)	Hanna Wynn (1–3)
April 8	5:30 PM	Loyola Marymount	Gail Miller Field • Provo, UT	W 4–0	2,552	McKenna Bull (16–10)	Hannah Bandimere (11–8)
April 8	7:30 PM	Loyola Marymount	Gail Miller Field • Provo, UT	L 4–9	2,552	Rachel Farrington (12–6)	Olivia Sanchez (5–6)
April 9	12:30 PM	Loyola Marymount	Gail Miller Field • Provo, UT	L 1–5	1,807	Hannah Bandimere (12–9)	McKenna Bull (16–11)
April 13*	6:00 PM	Utah State	Gail Miller Field • Provo, UT	W 4–1	397	McKenna Bull (17–11)	Alleyah Armendariz (0–3)
April 20*	3:00 PM	Utah Valley	UVU Wolverine Softball Field • Orem, UT	W 1–0	258	McKenna Bull (18–11)	Bailey Moore (3–19)
April 22	5:00 PM	Saint Mary's	Gail Miller Field • Provo, UT	W 7–0	2,445	McKenna Bull (19–11)	Katie Moss (11–10)
April 22	7:45 PM	Saint Mary's	Gail Miller Field • Provo, UT	W 13–2^{(5)}	2,445	McKenna Bull (20–11)	Lujane Mussadi (7–10)
April 23	12:00 PM	Saint Mary's	Gail Miller Field • Provo, UT	W 1–0	N/A	McKenna Bull (21–11)	Katie Moss (11–11)
April 29	5:00 PM	Pacific	Bill Simoni Field • Stockton, CA	W 5–3	184	McKenna Bull (22–11)	Cassidy Gustafson (4–6)
April 29	7:00 PM	Pacific	Bill Simoni Field • Stockton, CA	W 5–4	141	Olivia Sanchez (6–6)	Marissa Young (8–7)
April 30	1:00 PM	Pacific	Bill Simoni Field • Stockton, CA	W 8–4	117	McKenna Bull (23–11)	Cassidy Gustafson (4–7)
May 3*	3:00 PM	Southern Utah	Kathryn Berg Field • Cedar City, UT	L 5–6	50	Hanna Wynn (2–3)	Olivia Sanchez (6–7)
May 6	5:40 PM	Santa Clara	Gail Miller Field • Provo, UT	W 4–3	585	McKenna Bull (24–11)	McCall James (4–18)
May 6	8:30 PM	Santa Clara	Gail Miller Field • Provo, UT	W 15–4^{(5)}	585	Olivia Sanchez (7–7)	Micaela Vierra (4–19)
May 7	12:00 PM	Santa Clara	Gail Miller Field • Provo, UT	W 9–1^{(5)}	452	McKenna Bull (25–11)	Micaela Vierra (4–20)
May 10*	5:00 PM	Utah State	Johnson Softball Field • Logan, UT	Canceled			
May 13	7:00 PM	San Diego	USD Softball Complex • San Diego, CA	W 1–0^{(12)}	219	McKenna Bull (26–11)	Megan Sabbatini (14–17)
May 14	1:06 PM	San Diego	USD Softball Complex • San Diego, CA	L 2–5	218	Megan Sabbatini (15–17)	Olivia Sanchez (7–8)
May 14	3:33 PM	San Diego	USD Softball Complex • San Diego, CA	W 9–3	218	Arianna Paulson (2–0)	Grace Hernandez (5–11)
May 19	5:30 PM	#17 Missouri	University Field • Columbia, MO	L 0–9^{(5)}	N/A	Paige Lowary (23–6)	McKenna Bull (26–12)
May 20	3:40 PM	Louisville	University Field • Columbia, MO	W 9–6	N/A	McKenna Bull (27–12)	Megan Hensley (15–6)
May 20	6:33 PM	Nebraska	University Field • Columbia, MO	L 0–2	N/A	Cassie McClure (17–10)	McKenna Bull (27–13)
*Non-Conference Game. All times are in Mountain Time Zone.

== TV, radio, and streaming information ==
- Feb. 11: Brian Rice (radio- Tennessee)
- Mar. 3: No commentators
- Mar. 3: Derrick Palmer &
- Mar. 4: Derrick Palmer &
- Mar. 5: No commentators
- Mar. 11: Chris Plank (radio-Oklahoma)
- Mar. 12: Chris Plank (radio-Oklahoma)
- Mar. 15: Krista Blunk & Kenzie Fowler
- Mar. 22: Spencer Linton & Gary Sheide
- Apr. 1: Tyler Denning & Megan Willis
- Apr. 2: Tyler Denning & Megan Willis
- Apr. 2: Tyler Denning & Megan Willis
- Apr. 5: Spencer Linton & Gary Sheide
- Apr. 5: Spencer Linton & Gary Sheide
- Apr. 9: Robbie Bullough & Bailie Hicken
- Apr. 13: Spencer Linton & Gary Sheide
- Apr. 20: Josh Monsen (WAC DN)
  Robbie Bullough & Bailie Hicken (radio)
- Apr. 22: Robbie Bullough & Bailie Hicken
- Apr. 22: Robbie Bullough & Bailie Hicken
- Apr. 23: Spencer Linton & Gary Sheide
- Apr. 29: Paul Muyskens & Dustin Brakebill
- Apr. 29: Paul Muyskens & Dustin Brakebill
- Apr. 30: Paul Muyskens
- May 3: Josh Martinez & Colton Gordon
- May 6: Spencer Linton & Gary Sheide
- May 6: Spencer Linton & Gary Sheide
- May 7: Spencer Linton & Gary Sheide
- May 19: Pam Ward & Cheri Kempf
- May 20: Pam Ward & Cheri Kempf
- May 20: Pam Ward & Cheri Kempf
