= 2016 Auburn Tigers softball team =

American college softball season

2016 Auburn Tigers softball
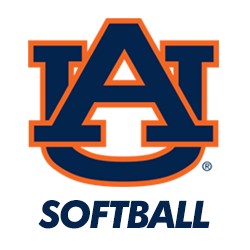

SEC Tournament Championship, W, 7–1 vs. LSU
- Conference: Southeastern Conference
- West
- Record: 58–12 (16–7 SEC)
- Head coach: Clint Myers
- Assistant coach: Scott Woodard, Casey Myers, & Corey Myers
- Pitching coach: Corey Myers
- Home stadium: Jane B. Moore Field

2016 Southeastern Conference softball standings
	Conf.				Overall
Team	W		L	PCT	W		L	PCT
No. 1 Florida ‍‍‍	20	–	4	.833	52	–	4	.929
No. 12 Kentucky ‍‍‍	17	–	7	.708	43	–	11	.796
No. 10 Tennessee ‍‍‍	16	–	7	.696	40	–	13	.755
No. 6 Auburn ‍‍‡‍	16	–	7	.696	46	–	9	.836
No. 4 Alabama ‍‍‍	16	–	8	.667	45	–	11	.804
No. 16 Missouri ‍‍‍	14	–	10	.583	39	–	13	.750
No. 13 LSU ‍‍‍	13	–	11	.542	42	–	14	.750
No. 15 Georgia ‍‍‍	12	–	12	.500	40	–	16	.714
Ole Miss ‍‍‍	11	–	13	.458	38	–	19	.667
No. 17 Texas A&M ‍‍‍	9	–	15	.375	37	–	17	.685
South Carolina ‍‍‍	7	–	17	.292	35	–	20	.636
Mississippi State ‍‍‍	3	–	21	.125	25	–	30	.455
Arkansas ‍‍‍	1	–	23	.042	17	–	39	.304
‡ – Tournament champion As of May 8, 2016; Rankings from NFCA

The 2016 Auburn Tigers softball team was an American softball team that represented Auburn University for the 2016 NCAA softball season. The Auburn Tigers played their home games at Jane B. Moore Field.

In 2015, the Auburn Tigers softball team went 56-11 during Clint Myers second season, and won its first SEC softball tournament on May 9, 2015, at Tiger Park in Baton Rouge, LA, by defeating #11 Tennessee in extra innings. Auburn garnered a #4 seed in the 2015 NCAA Division I softball tournament, and hosted a regional and super regional at Jane B. Moore Field in Auburn, AL. Auburn won both the regional and super regional and advanced to their first 2015 Women's College World Series at the ASA Hall of Fame Stadium in Oklahoma City, OK. They made it to the Finals of the tournament, where they lost to eventual champion Florida by two runs.

In the 2016 preseason fall exhibition games the Tigers were 8-0, only surrendering 3 runs.

In December 2015, Jane B. Moore Field began an 821-seat expansion along with more rest rooms, and will reconfigure the front of the stadium to add a grassy area for fans and kids before the first game.

The Tigers 2016 regular season began on February 11 at home against Appalachian State. SEC Play began on March 12, when the Tigers hosted the #1 Florida Gators.

Auburn finished the regular season in a tie for 3rd place within the conference, and received the 4th seed in the 2016 SEC softball tournament. Beating #5 Alabama and #1 Florida, they made it to their second SEC Championship Final in a row on May 14, 2016, held at Nusz Park in Starkville, MS, and defeated #14 LSU 7-1 to collect back-to-back SEC Championships in Softball.

Auburn garnered a #4 seed for the second year in a row in the 2016 NCAA Division I softball tournament, and hosted a regional and super regional at Jane B. Moore Field in Auburn, AL. Auburn won both the regional and super regional and advanced to the second NCAA Women's College World Series at the ASA Hall of Fame Stadium in Oklahoma City, OK, in as many years.

== Roster ==
2016 Auburn Tigers softball roster
Pitchers: 16 Kaylee Carlson – sophomore; 19 Rachael Walters – senior; 22 Marcy Harper – senior; 23 Lexi Davis – senior; 29 Makayla Martin – freshman; 44 Jenna Abbott – junior; Outfielders: 1 Tiffany Howard – senior; 12 Maria Mitchell – senior; 15 Bree Fornis – freshman; 17 Morgan Podany – freshman; 20 Hope Smith – freshman; 27 Victoria Draper – sophomore; 77 Sydne Waldrop – junior	Catchers: 00 Carlee Wallace – sophomore; 9 Madison Dickey – senior; 10 Anna Gibbs – junior; 12 Maria Mitchell – senior; 93 Courtney Shea – sophomore; Infielders: 2 Haley Fagan – junior; 3 Whitney Jordan – sophomore; 4 Madi Gipson – sophomore; 5 Emily Carosone – senior; 6 Blaire Bass – freshman; 7 Emily Spain – sophomore; 8 Jade Rhodes – senior; 9 Madison Dickey – senior; 11 Casey McCrackin – freshman; 13 Kasey Cooper – junior; 14 Kelsey Bogaards – senior; 24 Kendall Veach – freshman; 30 Tali Milde – freshman; 33 Kimberlee Myers – sophomore; 44 Jenna Abbott – junior

== Schedule ==
Official Schedule - LINK

Date	Time	Opponent	Rank	Venue	Result	TV	Record
February 11	6:00 PM	Appalachian State	4	Jane B. Moore Field • Auburn, AL	9-0 (5)	SECN+	1-0 (0-0)
February 12	5:30 PM	Western Kentucky	4	Plainsman Invite • Jane B. Moore Field • Auburn, AL	19-1 (5)	SECN+	2-0 (0-0)
February 13	12:30 PM	Butler	4	Plainsman Invite • Jane B. Moore Field • Auburn, AL	28-2 (5)	SECN+	3-0 (0-0)
February 13	3:00 PM	Furman	4	Plainsman Invite • Jane B. Moore Field • Auburn, AL	9-2	SECN+	4-0 (0-0)
February 14	1:00 PM	Appalachian State	4	Plainsman Invite • Jane B. Moore Field • Auburn, AL	22-5 (5)	SECN+	5-0 (0-0)
February 17	9:00 AM	#15 UCF	3	UCF Softball Complex • Orlando, FL	2-0		6-0 (0-0)
February 19	2:45 PM	Oklahoma State	3	Michele Smith Invitational • Eddie C. Moore Complex • Clearwater, FL	6-1		7-0 (0-0)
February 19	5:00 PM	USF	3	Michele Smith Invitational • Eddie C. Moore Complex • Clearwater, FL	6-0		8-0 (0-0)
February 20	11:15 AM	#19 James Madison	3	Michele Smith Invitational • Eddie C. Moore Complex • Clearwater, FL	2-3		8-1 (0-0)
February 20	1:45 PM	DePaul	3	Michele Smith Invitational • Eddie C. Moore Complex • Clearwater, FL	18-0 (5)		9-1 (0-0)
February 21	8:00 AM	Fordham	3	Michele Smith Invitational • Eddie C. Moore Complex • Clearwater, FL	18-1 (5)		10-1 (0-0)
February 25	5:30 PM	Boston College	3	Jane B. Moore Field • Auburn, AL	5-1		11-1 (0-0)
February 26	5:30 PM	Boston College	3	Tiger Invitational • Jane B. Moore Field • Auburn, AL	6-0		12-1 (0-0)
February 27	12:30 PM	St. John's	3	Tiger Invitational • Jane B. Moore Field • Auburn, AL	9-0 (5)	SECN+	13-1 (0-0)
February 27	3:00 PM	Western Illinois	3	Tiger Invitational • Jane B. Moore Field • Auburn, AL	14-1 (5)	SECN+	14-1 (0-0)
February 28	1:00 PM	Indiana State	3	Tiger Invitational • Jane B. Moore Field • Auburn, AL	21-0 (5)	SECN+	15-1 (0-0)
March 3	5:30 PM	Murray State	3	Jane B. Moore Field • Auburn, AL	CANCELLED	SECN+	15-1 (0-0)
March 4	5:30 PM	Indiana	3	Wilson/DeMarini Classic • Jane B. Moore Field • Auburn, AL	8-7 (8)	SECN+	16-1 (0-0)
March 5	12:30 PM	Murray State	3	Wilson/DeMarini Classic • Jane B. Moore Field • Auburn, AL	10-0 (5)	SECN+	17-1 (0-0)
March 5	3:00 PM	Bryant University	3	Wilson/DeMarini Classic • Jane B. Moore Field • Auburn, AL	10-0 (6)	SECN+	18-1 (0-0)
March 6	1:00 PM	Georgia State	3	Wilson/DeMarini Classic • Jane B. Moore Field • Auburn, AL	7-0	SECN	19-1 (0-0)
March 6	3:30 PM	Georgia State	3	Wilson/DeMarini Classic • Jane B. Moore Field • Auburn, AL	9-0 (6)		20-1 (0-0)
March 9	4:00 PM	Tennessee State	3	Jane B. Moore Field • Auburn, AL	7-0	SECN+	21-1 (0-0)
March 9	6:30 PM	Tennessee State	3	Jane B. Moore Field • Auburn, AL	8-0 (5)	SECN+	22-1 (0-0)
March 12	7:30 PM	#1 Florida	3	Jane B. Moore Field • Auburn, AL	3-6	SECN	22-2 (0-1)
March 13	4:00 PM	#1 Florida	3	Jane B. Moore Field • Auburn, AL	5-8	SECN	22-3 (0-2)
March 14	6:00 PM	#1 Florida	3	Jane B. Moore Field • Auburn, AL	5-4	SECN	23-3 (1-2)
March 16	5:00 PM	Samford	3	Samford Softball Field • Birmingham, AL	18-1		24-3 (1-2)
March 18	6:00 PM	Mississippi State	3	Nusz Park • Starkville, MS	3-2 (14)	SECN+	25-3 (2-2)
March 19	2:00 PM	Mississippi State	3	Nusz Park • Starkville, MS	3-6	SECN+	25-4 (2-3)
March 20	2:00 PM	Mississippi State	3	Nusz Park • Starkville, MS	2-0	SECN+	26-4 (3-3)
March 23	4:00 PM	Georgia State	3	Robert E. Heck Softball Complex • Atlanta, GA	8-4		27-4 (3-3)
March 25	6:00 PM	South Carolina	3	Jane B. Moore Field • Auburn, AL	10-0 (5)	SECN+	28-4 (4-3)
March 26	6:00 PM	South Carolina	3	Jane B. Moore Field • Auburn, AL	5-2	SECN+	29-4 (5-3)
March 27	1:00 PM	South Carolina	3	Jane B. Moore Field • Auburn, AL	4-3	SECN+	30-4 (6-3)
April 1	5:00 PM	#14 Kentucky	3	John Cropp Stadium • Lexington, KY	9-0 (5)	SECN+	31-4 (7-3)
April 2	2:00 PM	#14 Kentucky	3	John Cropp Stadium • Lexington, KY	6-5	SECN+	32-4 (8-3)
April 3	12:00 PM	#14 Kentucky	3	John Cropp Stadium • Lexington, KY	3-1 (9)	SECN+	33-4 (9-3)
April 6	6:00 PM	Troy	3	Jane B. Moore Field • Auburn, AL	8-1	SECN+	34-4 (9-3)
April 8	6:00 PM	Longwood	3	Jane B. Moore Field • Auburn, AL	2-1	SECN+	35-4 (9-3)
April 9	6:00 PM	Longwood	3	Jane B. Moore Field • Auburn, AL	5-2	SECN+	36-4 (9-3)
April 10	1:00 PM	Longwood	3	Jane B. Moore Field • Auburn, AL	6-5	SECN+	37-4 (9-3)
April 13	4:00 PM	UAB	3	UAB Softball Field • Birmingham, AL	8-1		38-4 (9-3)
April 15	6:00 PM	Arkansas	3	Bogle Park • Fayetteville, AR	21-0 (5)	SECN+	39-4 (10-3)
April 16	1:00 PM	Arkansas	3	Bogle Park • Fayetteville, AR	23-0 (5)	SECN+	40-4 (11-3)
April 17	1:00 PM	Arkansas	3	Bogle Park • Fayetteville, AR	10-0 (5)	SECN+	41-4 (12-3)
April 20	4:00 PM	#8 Florida State	3	Jane B. Moore Field • Auburn, AL	9-6	SECN+	42-4 (12-3)
April 20	6:30 PM	#8 Florida State	3	Jane B. Moore Field • Auburn, AL	3-4	SECN+	42-5 (12-3)
April 22	6:00 PM	#13 Georgia	3	Jane B. Moore Field • Auburn, AL	4-3	SECN+	43-5 (13-3)
April 23	1:00 PM	#13 Georgia	3	Jane B. Moore Field • Auburn, AL	13-2 (5)	ESPNU	44-5 (14-3)
April 24	4:00 PM	#13 Georgia	3	Jane B. Moore Field • Auburn, AL	2-1	SECN+	45-5 (15-3)
May 1*	2:00 PM	#13 Tennessee	3	Sherri Parker Lee Stadium • Knoxville, TN	2-10 (5)	SECN+	45-6 (15-4)
May 1	6:00 PM	#13 Tennessee	3	Sherri Parker Lee Stadium • Knoxville, TN	1-12 (5)	ESPNU	45-7 (15-5)
May 2	6:00 PM	#13 Tennessee	3	Sherri Parker Lee Stadium • Knoxville, TN	CANCELLED	SECN	45-7 (15-5)
May 6	6:00 PM	#17 Texas A&M	6	Jane B. Moore Field • Auburn, AL	5-6 (8)	SECN+	45-8 (15-6)
May 7	1:00 PM	#17 Texas A&M	6	Jane B. Moore Field • Auburn, AL	6-13	ESPN	45-9 (15-7)
May 8	12:00 PM	#17 Texas A&M	6	Jane B. Moore Field • Auburn, AL	5-4	SECN+	46-9 (16-7)
May 13*	11:00 AM	#5 Alabama	8	2016 SEC softball tournament Quarterfinals • Nusz Park • Starkville, MS	6-4	ESPNU	47-9 (16-7)
May 13	4:30 PM	#1 Florida	8	2016 SEC softball tournament Semifinals • Nusz Park • Starkville, MS	2-1	ESPNU	48-9 (16-7)
May 14	4:00 PM	#12 LSU	8	2016 SEC softball tournament Championship • Nusz Park • Starkville, MS	7-1	ESPN	49-9 (16-7)
May 20	2:00 PM*	Jacksonville State	5	2016 NCAA Division I softball tournament • Regional • Jane B. Moore Field • Auburn, AL	2-1	ESPN3	50-9 (16-7)
May 21	1:30 PM	USC Upstate	5	2016 NCAA Division I softball tournament • Regional • Jane B. Moore Field • Auburn, AL	6-1	ESPN3	51-9 (16-7)
May 22	1:30 PM	Jacksonville State	5	2016 NCAA Division I softball tournament • Regional • Jane B. Moore Field • Auburn, AL	14-2 (5)	ESPN3	52-9 (16-7)
May 28	5:30 PM	#18 Arizona	5	2016 NCAA Division I softball tournament • Super Regional • Jane B. Moore Field • Auburn, AL	3-5	ESPN2	52-10 (16-7)
May 29	1:00 PM	#18 Arizona	5	2016 NCAA Division I softball tournament • Super Regional • Jane B. Moore Field • Auburn, AL	4-1	ESPN	53-10 (16-7)
May 29	4:00 PM	#18 Arizona	5	2016 NCAA Division I softball tournament • Super Regional • Jane B. Moore Field • Auburn, AL	6-1	ESPNU	54-10 (16-7)
June 2	1:30 PM	#14 UCLA	5	2016 Women's College World Series • ASA Hall of Fame Stadium • Oklahoma City, OK	10-3	ESPN	55-10 (16-7)
June 4	6:00 PM	#16 Georgia	5	2016 Women's College World Series • ASA Hall of Fame Stadium • Oklahoma City, OK	4-3	ESPN2	56-10 (16-7)
June 5	6:00 PM	#8 Florida State	5	2016 Women's College World Series • ASA Hall of Fame Stadium • Oklahoma City, OK	8-7 (8)	ESPN2	57-10 (16-7)
June 6	7:00 PM	#3 Oklahoma	5	2016 Women's College World Series • ASA Hall of Fame Stadium • Oklahoma City, OK	2-3	ESPN	57-11 (16-7)
June 7	7:00 PM	#3 Oklahoma	5	2016 Women's College World Series • ASA Hall of Fame Stadium • Oklahoma City, OK	11-7 (8)	ESPN	58-11 (16-7)
June 8	6:00 PM	#3 Oklahoma	5	2016 Women's College World Series • ASA Hall of Fame Stadium • Oklahoma City, OK	1-2	ESPN	58-12 (16-7)

- Game 1 of the series at Tennessee was postponed from April 30 from May 1 due to rain. The game was begun at 7:15 PM on April 30 on ESPN2, but was postponed in the bottom of the 1st inning with Auburn leading 1-0.
- The SEC Tournament Quarterfinals game against Alabama was originally scheduled for May 12 at 6:30 PM on the SEC Network, but rain in the previous game postponed it to the following morning at 11:00 AM on ESPNU.
- The NCAA Softball Regional game against Jacksonville State was moved up to 2:00 PM from 6:00 PM later that night due to a threat of severe weather.
- The Women's College World Series game against Georgia was originally intended to be played on June 3 at 6:00 PM. Due to rain on June 2, two games that night had to be postponed and were made up on June 3 beginning at 6:00 PM, therefore forcing the Auburn-Georgia game to be postponed to the following night.

== Ranking movement ==
Poll	Pre	Wk 1	Wk 2	Wk 3	Wk 4	Wk 5	Wk 6	Wk 7	Wk 8	Wk 9	Wk 10	Wk 11	Wk 12	Wk 13	Wk 14	Final
USA Today / NFCA Coaches	4	3	3	3	3	3	3	3	3 (2)	3 (2)	3 (1)	3	6	8	5 (2)	2
ESPN / USA Softball	6	3	3	4	3	3	3	3	2 (3)	2 (5)	2 (1)	3	6	8	5 (1)	2
