= 2015 NCAA Division I softball season =

American college softball season

- Defending Champions: Florida

Tournament
- Duration: May 14–June 3, 2015

Women's College World Series
- Duration: May 28–June 3, 2015
- Champions: Florida (2nd title)
- Runners-up: Michigan (12th WCWS Appearance)
- Winning Coach: Tim Walton (2nd title)
- WCWS MOP: Lauren Haeger (Florida)

Seasons
- ← 2014 2016 →

The 2015 NCAA Division I softball season, play of college softball in the United States organized by the National Collegiate Athletic Association (NCAA) at the Division I level, began in February 2015. The season progressed through the regular season, many conference tournaments and championship series, and concluded with the 2015 NCAA Division I softball tournament and 2015 Women's College World Series. The Women's College World Series, consisting of the eight remaining teams in the NCAA Tournament and held annually in Oklahoma City at ASA Hall of Fame Stadium, ended in June 2015.

Florida won their second title in a row, defeating Michigan in the championship series 2 games to one.

== Conference standings ==
2015 American Athletic Conference softball standings
	Conf.				Overall
Team	W		L	PCT	W		L	PCT
No. 16 UCF ‍†‍‡‍^{y}	16	–	2	.889	50	–	9	.847
Tulsa ‍‍‍	12	–	6	.667	36	–	18	.667
Houston ‍‍‍	10	–	7	.588	28	–	27	.509
East Carolina ‍‍‍	7	–	11	.389	16	–	37	.302
South Florida ‍‍‍	6	–	10	.375	36	–	20	.643
Memphis ‍‍‍	6	–	12	.333	19	–	34	.358
UConn ‍‍‍	4	–	13	.235	18	–	35	.340
† – Conference champion ‡ – Tournament champion y – Invited to the NCAA tournament As of May 17, 2015; Rankings from USA Today/NFCA Coaches

2015 Big 12 Conference softball standings
	Conf.				Overall
Team	W		L	PCT	W		L	PCT
No. 9 Oklahoma ‍†‍‍^{y}	14	–	2	.875	49	–	9	.845
No. 18 Baylor ‍‍‍^{y}	12	–	6	.667	41	–	17	.707
Texas ‍‍‍^{y}	12	–	6	.667	38	–	17	.691
Texas Tech ‍‍‍	9	–	9	.500	25	–	26	.490
Kansas ‍‍‍^{y}	8	–	10	.444	40	–	15	.727
Oklahoma State ‍‍‍	3	–	13	.188	21	–	30	.412
Iowa State ‍‍‍	3	–	15	.167	26	–	28	.481
† – Conference champion y – Invited to the NCAA tournament Rankings from NFCA

2015 Big East Conference softball standings
	Conf.				Overall
Team	W		L	PCT	W		L	PCT
St. John's ‍†‍‡‍^{y}	16	–	2	.889	28	–	19	.596
DePaul ‍‍‍	13	–	4	.765	22	–	24	.478
Seton Hall ‍‍‍	10	–	10	.500	25	–	28	.472
Butler ‍‍‍	9	–	12	.429	24	–	27	.471
Villanova ‍‍‍	9	–	12	.429	24	–	30	.444
Providence ‍‍‍	8	–	11	.421	16	–	23	.410
Creighton ‍‍‍	7	–	12	.368	22	–	31	.415
Georgetown ‍‍‍	5	–	14	.263	15	–	32	.319
† – Conference champion ‡ – Tournament champion y – Invited to the NCAA tournament As of June 30, 2015; Rankings from NFCA

2015 Big Ten Conference softball standings
	Conf.				Overall
Team	W		L	PCT	W		L	PCT
No. 2 Michigan ‍†‍‡‍^{y}	21	–	2	.913	60	–	8	.882
No. 15 Minnesota ‍‍‍^{y}	20	–	3	.870	49	–	11	.817
Nebraska ‍‍‍^{y}	17	–	6	.739	35	–	23	.603
Northwestern ‍‍‍^{y}	14	–	8	.636	28	–	23	.549
Illinois ‍‍‍	14	–	9	.609	26	–	27	.491
Ohio State ‍‍‍	12	–	11	.522	30	–	22	.577
Rutgers ‍‍‍	11	–	12	.478	29	–	20	.592
Penn State ‍‍‍	9	–	14	.391	29	–	28	.509
Maryland ‍‍‍	9	–	14	.391	27	–	27	.500
Iowa ‍‍‍	8	–	15	.348	19	–	40	.322
Purdue ‍‍‍	7	–	14	.333	31	–	25	.554
Indiana ‍‍‍	7	–	14	.333	17	–	39	.304
Wisconsin ‍‍‍	5	–	17	.227	21	–	31	.404
Michigan State ‍‍‍	4	–	19	.174	19	–	36	.345
† – Conference champion ‡ – Tournament champion y – Invited to the NCAA tournament As of June 5, 2015; Rankings from NFCA

2015 Colonial Athletic Association softball standings
	Conf.						Overall
Team	W		L		T	PCT	W		L		T	PCT
#17 James Madison†^{y} ‍‍‍	19	–	0	–	0	1.000	48	–	10	–	0	.828
Hofstra ‍‍‡‍^{y}	17	–	3	–	0	.850	38	–	14	–	1	.726
Elon ‍‍‍	11	–	10	–	0	.524	31	–	22	–	0	.585
Towson ‍‍‍	10	–	11	–	0	.476	35	–	22	–	0	.614
College of Charleston ‍‍‍	7	–	14	–	0	.333	24	–	29	–	0	.453
Drexel ‍‍‍	6	–	13	–	0	.316	19	–	23	–	0	.452
Delaware ‍‍‍	6	–	14	–	0	.300	30	–	23	–	0	.566
UNC Wilmington ‍‍‍	5	–	16	–	0	.238	19	–	27	–	0	.413
† – Conference champion ‡ – Tournament champion As of May 24, 2015; Rankings from USA Today/NFCA Coaches

2015 Ohio Valley Conference softball standings
	Conf.				Overall
Team	W		L	PCT	W		L	PCT
SIU Edwardsville ‍‍‍	20	–	6	.769	43	–	16	.729
Jacksonville State ‍‍‍	18	–	6	.750	38	–	17	.691
Murray State ‍‍‍	20	–	7	.741	38	–	19	.667
Tennessee Tech ‡ ‍‍‍	15	–	11	.577	32	–	25	.561
Eastern Kentucky ‍‍‍	13	–	10	.565	24	–	28	.462
Eastern Illinois ‍‍‍	14	–	11	.560	21	–	27	.438
Southeast Missouri St. ‍‍‍	12	–	12	.500	19	–	27	.413
Morehead State ‍‍‍	11	–	11	.500	22	–	24	.478
Tennessee–Martin ‍‍‍	9	–	15	.375	24	–	26	.480
Belmont ‍‍‍	8	–	16	.333	13	–	32	.289
Austin Peay ‍‍‍	5	–	22	.185	9	–	37	.196
Tennessee State ‍‍‍	4	–	22	.154	11	–	37	.229
‡ – OVC Tournament champion As of May 9, 2015; Rankings from USA Today/NFCA Coaches

2015 Pac-12 Conference softball standings
	Conf.				Overall
Team	W		L	PCT	W		L	PCT
No. 7 Oregon ‍†‍‍^{y}	21	–	3	.875	51	–	8	.864
No. 5 UCLA ‍‍‍^{y}	19	–	5	.792	51	–	12	.810
No. 13 Arizona ‍‍‍^{y}	13	–	11	.542	41	–	20	.672
Utah ‍‍‍^{y}	12	–	11	.522	36	–	19	.655
No. 20 Arizona State ‍‍‍^{y}	12	–	11	.522	36	–	22	.621
No. 21 Washington ‍‍‍^{y}	11	–	11	.500	42	–	17	.712
No. 23 California ‍‍‍^{y}	10	–	14	.417	39	–	18	.684
Oregon State ‍‍‍	6	–	18	.250	26	–	26	.500
Stanford ‍‍‍	2	–	22	.083	17	–	37	.315
† – Conference champion y – Invited to the NCAA tournament As of June 30, 2015; Rankings from NFCA/USA Today

2015 Southeastern Conference softball standings
	Conf.				Overall
Team	W		L	PCT	W		L	PCT
No. 2 Florida ‍†‍‍^{y}	18	–	5	.783	50	–	6	.893
No. 4 Auburn ‍‍‡‍^{y}	18	–	6	.750	49	–	9	.845
No. 5 Alabama ‍‍‍^{y}	17	–	7	.708	42	–	12	.778
No. 8 LSU ‍‍‍^{y}	15	–	9	.625	44	–	11	.800
No. 10 Tennessee ‍‍‍^{y}	15	–	9	.625	42	–	14	.750
No. 14 Georgia ‍‍‍^{y}	14	–	9	.609	40	–	14	.741
No. 12 Missouri ‍‍‍^{y}	14	–	10	.583	39	–	14	.736
No. 24 Texas A&M ‍‍‍^{y}	12	–	12	.500	38	–	18	.679
South Carolina ‍‍‍^{y}	10	–	14	.417	37	–	20	.649
Mississippi State ‍‍‍^{y}	10	–	14	.417	35	–	18	.660
Ole Miss ‍‍‍	6	–	18	.250	30	–	25	.545
Kentucky ‍‍‍^{y}	5	–	19	.208	29	–	24	.547
Arkansas ‍‍‍	1	–	23	.042	16	–	37	.302
† – Conference champion ‡ – Tournament champion y – Invited to the NCAA tournament As of May 12, 2015; Rankings from USA Today/NFCA Coaches

2015 Southland Conference softball standings
	Conf.						Overall
Team	W		L		PCT		W	L		PCT
East Division
Northwestern State ** ^{x} ‍‍‍	22	–	3	–	0	.880		36	–	18	–	0	.667
McNeese State ‍‍‍	21	–	5	–	0	.808		36	–	20	–	0	.643
Central Arkansas ‡ ‍‍‍	16	–	8	–	0	.667		35	–	21	–	0	.625
Southeastern Louisiana ‍‍‍	15	–	10	–	0	.600		22	–	30	–	0	.423
Lamar ‍‍‍	14	–	10	–	0	.583		26	–	28	–	0	.481
Nicholls ‍‍‍	12	–	14	–	0	.462		26	–	22	–	0	.542
West Division
Texas A&M–Corpus Christi ^{x} ‍‍‍	15	–	11	–	0	.577		20	–	28	–	1	.418
Stephen F. Austin ‍‍‍	11	–	15	–	0	.423		19	–	32	–	0	.373
Sam Houston ‍‍‍	10	–	15	–	0	.400		19	–	28	–	0	.404
Abilene Christian * ‍‍‍	8	–	19	–	0	.296		14	–	33	–	0	.298
Houston Baptist ‍‍‍	5	–	20	–	0	.200		13	–	32	–	0	.289
Incarnate Word * ‍‍‍	4	–	23	–	0	.148		12	–	39	–	0	.235
‡ – SLC Tournament Champion *ineligible for postseason play due to Div. I transition **Southland Tournament #1 seed^{x} Division Champions champion As of May 22, 2015; Rankings from USA Today/NFCA Coaches

2015 Sun Belt Conference softball standings
	Conf.				Overall
Team	W		L	PCT	W		L	PCT
No. 11 Louisiana–Lafayette†^{y} ‍‍‍	20	–	3	.870	42	–	12	.778
No. 22 South Alabama ‍‍‡‍^{y}	16	–	4	.800	40	–	13	.755
Texas State ‍‍‍	14	–	6	.700	32	–	21	.604
Troy ‍‍‍	14	–	9	.609	32	–	23	.582
Georgia State ‍‍‍	14	–	10	.583	38	–	22	.633
Louisiana–Monroe ‍‍‍	10	–	12	.455	30	–	22	.577
Texas–Arlington ‍‍‍	8	–	15	.348	27	–	28	.491
Georgia Southern ‍‍‍	4	–	20	.167	12	–	39	.235
Appalachian State ‍‍‍	1	–	22	.043	14	–	35	.286
† – Conference champion ‡ – Tournament champion y – Invited to the NCAA tournament As of May 24, 2015; Rankings from USA Today/NFCA Coaches

2015 West Coast Conference softball standings
	Conf.				Overall
Team	W		L	PCT	W		L	PCT
BYU ‍†‍‍^{y}	13	–	2	.867	39	–	12	.765
San Diego ‍‍‍	8	–	7	.533	29	–	23	.558
Loyola Marymount ‍‍‍	8	–	7	.533	26	–	28	.481
Pacific ‍‍‍	7	–	8	.467	19	–	36	.345
Saint Mary's ‍‍‍	5	–	10	.333	21	–	32	.396
Santa Clara ‍‍‍	4	–	11	.267	15	–	35	.300
† – Conference champion y – Invited to the NCAA tournament As of May 10, 2015; Rankings from USA Today/NFCA Coaches

== Women's College World Series ==
The 2015 Women's College World Series began on May 28 in Oklahoma City.

First round
1	Florida	7
8	Tennessee	2
5	LSU	6
4	Auburn	1
8	Tennessee	2
4	Auburn	4
3	Michigan	5
6	Alabama	0
7	UCLA	7
2	Oregon	1
6	Alabama	2
2	Oregon	1

Second round
1	Florida	4
5	LSU	0
7	UCLA	10
4	Auburn	11^{(10)}
3	Michigan	10
7	UCLA	4
5	LSU	5
6	Alabama	3

Semifinals
1	Florida	3^{(9)}	—
4	Auburn	2	—
3	Michigan	6	—
5	LSU	3	—

Finals
1	Florida	3	0	4
3	Michigan	2	1	1

== Season leaders ==
Batting

- Batting average: .566 – Torrian Wright, Savannah State Lady Tigers
- RBIs: 86 – Chelsea Goodacre, Arizona Wildcats
- Home runs: 32 – Lexie Elkins, Louisiana Ragin' Cajuns

Pitching

- Wins: 36-17 – Erica Romero, San Diego State Aztecs
- ERA: 0.87 (26 ER/208.1 IP) – Shelby Turnier, UCF Knights
- Strikeouts: 439 – Miranda Kramer, Western Kentucky Lady Toppers

== Records ==
Freshman class consecutive wins streak: 27 – Megan Good, James Madison Dukes; February 14-May 6, 2015

Freshman class perfect games: 4 – Paige Parker, Oklahoma Sooners

Junior class home runs: 32 – Lexie Elkins, Louisiana Ragin' Cajuns

Junior class slugging percentage: 1.229% – Torrian Wright, Savannah State Lady Tigers

== Awards ==
- USA Softball Collegiate Player of the Year:

Lauren Haeger, Florida Gators

- Honda Sports Award Softball:

Lauren Haeger, Florida Gators

YEAR	W	L	GP	GS	CG	SHO	SV	IP	H	R	ER	BB	SO	ERA	WHIP
2015	32	2	41	35	25	12	0	222.1	145	41	39	43	214	1.23	0.84

YEAR	G	AB	R	H	BA	RBI	HR	3B	2B	TB	SLG	BB	SO	SB	SBA
2015	67	187	50	65	.347	71	19	0	9	131	.700%	49	23	2	3

- espnW National Player of The Year:

Sierra Romero, Michigan Wolverines

YEAR	G	AB	R	H	BA	RBI	HR	3B	2B	TB	SLG	BB	SO	SB	SBA
2015	68	176	85	79	.449	83	22	2	11	160	.909%	58	8	21	25

- NFCA National Freshman of the Year:

Paige Parker, Oklahoma Sooners

YEAR	W	L	GP	GS	CG	SHO	SV	IP	H	R	ER	BB	SO	ERA	WHIP
2015	28	7	42	31	23	9	3	217.0	129	56	51	57	224	1.64	0.85

- NFCA Catcher of the Year:

Lexie Elkins, Louisiana

- NFCA Golden Shoe Award:

Morgan Zerkle, Marshall

== All America Teams ==
The following players were members of the All-American Teams.

First Team

Position	Player	Class	School
P	Cheridan Hawkins	JR.	Oregon Ducks
P	Miranda Kramer	SR.	Western Kentucky Hilltoppers
P	Shelby Turnier	JR.	UCF Knights
C	Lexie Elkins	JR.	ULL Ragin' Cajuns
1B	Lauren Chamberlain	SR.	Oklahoma Sooners
2B	Emily Carosone	JR.	Auburn Tigers
3B	Kasey Cooper	SO.	Auburn Tigers
SS	Bianka Bell	JR.	LSU Tigers
OF	Haylie McCleney	JR.	Alabama Crimson Tide
OF	Allexis Bennett	JR.	UCLA Bruins
OF	Kelly Christner	JR.	Michigan Wolverines
UT	Lauren Haeger	SR.	Florida Gators
UT	Amber Freeman	SR.	Arizona State Sun Devils
AT-L	Sierra Romero	JR.	Michigan Wolverines
AT-L	Kelsey Stewart	JR.	Florida Gators
AT-L	Ally Carda	SR.	UCLA Bruins
AT-L	Shelby Pendley	SR.	Oklahoma Sooners
AT-L	Alaynie Page	JR.	South Carolina Gamecocks

Second Team

Position	Player	Class	School
P	Paige Parker	FR.	Oklahoma Sooners
P	Megan Good	FR.	James Madison Dukes
P	Alexis Osorio	FR.	Alabama Crimson Tide
C	Ivie Drake	FR.	Georgia State Panthers
1B	Kayla Bonstrom	JR.	Stanford Cardinal
2B	Alex Hugo	JR.	Georgia Bulldogs
3B	Jenna Lilley	FR.	Oregon Ducks
SS	Delaney Spaulding	SO.	UCLA Bruins
OF	Bailey Landry	SO.	LSU Tigers
OF	Cheyenne Cordes	SR.	California Golden Bears
OF	Janie Takeda	SR.	Oregon Ducks
UT	Sara Groenewegen	SO.	Minnesota Golden Gophers
UT	Sahvanna Jaquish	SO.	LSU Tigers
AT-L	Megan Betsa	SO.	Michigan Wolverines
AT-L	Rainey Gaffin	JR.	Tennessee Lady Vols
AT-L	Shellie Landry	JR.	ULL Ragin' Cajuns
AT-L	Chelsea Goodacre	SR.	Arizona Wildcats
AT-L	Stephany LaRosa	SR.	UCLA Bruins

Third Team

Position	Player	Class	School
P	Carly Hoover	SO.	LSU Tigers
P	Lacey Waldrop	SR.	FSU Seminoles
P	Allie Walljasper	FR.	LSU Tigers
C	Erika Piancastelli	FR.	McNeese State Cowgirls
1B	Shelby Friudenberg	FR.	Baylor Bears
2B	Demi Turner	FR.	Alabama Crimson Tide
3B	Marisa Runyon	JR.	Alabama Crimson Tide
SS	Kellie Fox	SR.	Arizona Wildcats
OF	Tiffany Howard	JR.	Auburn Tigers
OF	Sierra Lawrence	JR.	Michigan Wolverines
OF	Katiyana Mauga	SO.	Arizona Wildcats
UT	Cortni Emanuel	FR.	Georgia Bulldogs
UT	Jailyn Ford	JR.	James Madison Dukes
AT-L	Emilee Koerner	SR.	Notre Dame Fighting Irish
AT-L	Haylie Wagner	SR.	Michigan Wolverines
AT-L	Kristen Brown	JR.	North Carolina Tar Heels
AT-L	Missy Taukeiaho	JR.	Cal State Fullerton Titans
AT-L	Aleshia Ocasio	JR.	Florida Gators
AT-L	Kiki Stokes	JR.	Nebraska Cornhuskers
