= 2015 UCLA Bruins softball team =

American college softball season

2015 UCLA Bruins softball

NCAA Los Angeles Super Regional champion NCAA Los Angeles Regional champion

Women's College World Series, 1–2
- Conference: Pac-12 Conference
- Record: 51–12 (19–5 Pac-12)
- Head coach: Kelly Inouye-Perez (9th season)
- Home stadium: Easton Stadium

2015 Pac-12 Conference softball standings
	Conf.				Overall
Team	W		L	PCT	W		L	PCT
No. 7 Oregon ‍†‍‍^{y}	21	–	3	.875	51	–	8	.864
No. 5 UCLA ‍‍‍^{y}	19	–	5	.792	51	–	12	.810
No. 13 Arizona ‍‍‍^{y}	13	–	11	.542	41	–	20	.672
Utah ‍‍‍^{y}	12	–	11	.522	36	–	19	.655
No. 20 Arizona State ‍‍‍^{y}	12	–	11	.522	36	–	22	.621
No. 21 Washington ‍‍‍^{y}	11	–	11	.500	42	–	17	.712
No. 23 California ‍‍‍^{y}	10	–	14	.417	39	–	18	.684
Oregon State ‍‍‍	6	–	18	.250	26	–	26	.500
Stanford ‍‍‍	2	–	22	.083	17	–	37	.315
† – Conference champion y – Invited to the NCAA tournament As of June 30, 2015; Rankings from NFCA/USA Today

The 2015 UCLA Bruins softball team represented the University of California, Los Angeles in the 2015 NCAA Division I softball season. The Bruins were coached by Kelly Inouye-Perez, in her ninth season as head coach. The Bruins played their home games at Easton Stadium and finished with a record of 51–12. They competed in the Pac-12 Conference, where they finished second with a 19–5 record.

The Bruins were invited to the 2015 NCAA Division I softball tournament, where they won the Los Angeles Regional and Super Regional to advance to the Women's College World Series. They finished tied for fifth place with a win against Oregon and losses to eventual runner-up Michigan and Auburn.

== Personnel ==
=== Roster ===
2015 UCLA Bruins roster
Pitchers: 3 - Ally Carda - Senior; 15 - Johanna Grauer - Freshman; 18 - Selina Ta'amilo - Freshman; 21 - Courtney Rivera - Senior; 55 - Paige McDuffee - Junior; Catchers: 7 - Brittany Moeai - Junior; 11 - Stephany LaRosa - Senior; 12 - Jazmine Sosa - Junior; 22 - Marisa Schwartz - Senior; 88 - Madeline Jelenicki - Freshman	Infielders: 14 - Mysha Sataraka - Junior; 33 - Gracie Goulder - Senior; 99 - Delaney Spaulding - Sophomore; Outfielders: 5 - Kaelin Sprawls - Senior; 19 - Jessica Amaral - Senior; 23 - Tara Mueller - Senior; 24 - Robyn Corruth - Sophomore; 48 - Allexis Bennett - Junior	Utility: 4 - Gabrielle Maurice - Sophomore; 8 - Kylee Perez - Freshman; 28 - Sam Duran - Senior; 34 - Izzy Ordorica - Freshman; 42 - Jelly Felix - Sophomore; - Elise Laws - Freshman

=== Coaches ===
2015 UCLA Bruins softball coaching staff
- Kelly Inouye-Perez - Head coach - 9th season
- Lisa Fernandez - Assistant Coach - 17th season
- Kirk Walker - Assistant Coach - 14th season
- Hayden Maurice - Assistant Coach

== Schedule ==
Legend
	UCLA win
	UCLA loss
*	Non-Conference game

2015 UCLA Bruins softball game log
Regular season

February
Date	Opponent	Rank	Site/stadium	Score	Overall record	Pac-12 record
Feb 5	Idaho State*	No. 7	Easton Stadium • Los Angeles, CA (So Cal Collegiate Classic)	W 13–3 ^{(6)}	1–0	
Feb 6	No. 24 Texas A&M*	No. 7	Easton Stadium • Los Angeles, CA (So Cal Collegiate Classic)	W 13–0 ^{(5)}	2–0	
Feb 6	No. 22 Notre Dame*	No. 7	Easton Stadium • Los Angeles, CA (So Cal Collegiate Classic)	L 4–8	2–1	
Feb 7	No. 24 Texas A&M*	No. 7	Easton Stadium • Los Angeles, CA (So Cal Collegiate Classic)	L 4–6	2–2	
Feb 7	Purdue*	No. 7	Easton Stadium • Los Angeles, CA (So Cal Collegiate Classic)	W 9–3	3–2	
Feb 8	San Diego State*	No. 7	Easton Stadium • Los Angeles, CA (So Cal Collegiate Classic)	W 4–1	4–2	
Feb 13	vs Northwestern*	No. 12	Eller Media Stadium • Paradise, NV (Wilson/DeMarini Desert Classic)	W 12–3	5–2	
Feb 13	vs New Mexico*	No. 12	Eller Media Stadium • Paradise, NV (Wilson/DeMarini Desert Classic)	W 16–0 ^{(5)}	6–2	
Feb 14	vs Utah State*	No. 12	Stephanie Craig Park • Henderson, NV (Wilson/DeMarini Desert Classic)	W 12–4	7–2	
Feb 14	vs Hawaii*	No. 12	Eller Media Stadium • Paradise, NV (Wilson/DeMarini Desert Classic)	W 8–4	8–2	
Feb 15	vs Boise State*	No. 12	Eller Media Stadium • Paradise, NV (Wilson/DeMarini Desert Classic)	W 6–0	9–2	
Feb 19	vs Indiana*	No. 12	Big League Dreams Sports Park • Cathedral City, CA (Mary Nutter Collegiate Classic)	W 7–4	10–2	
Feb 19	vs No. 25 Texas*	No. 12	Big League Dreams Sports Park • Cathedral City, CA (Mary Nutter Collegiate Classic)	L 3–5	10–3	
Feb 20	vs Missouri*	No. 12	Big League Dreams Sports Park • Cathedral City, CA (Mary Nutter Collegiate Classic)	W 8–0 ^{(6)}	11–3	
Feb 21	vs Ohio State*	No. 12	Big League Dreams Sports Park • Cathedral City, CA (Mary Nutter Collegiate Classic)	W 8–0 ^{(6)}	12–3	
Feb 21	vs No. 9 Florida State*	No. 12	Big League Dreams Sports Park • Cathedral City, CA (Mary Nutter Collegiate Classic)	L 1–5	12–4	
Feb 22	vs Nebraska*	No. 12	Big League Dreams Sports Park • Cathedral City, CA (Mary Nutter Collegiate Classic)	W 5–1 ^{(6)}	13–4	
Feb 27	vs Wichita State*	No. 14	Mayfair Park Lakewood • Lakewood, CA (Long Beach State Invitational)	W 11–0 ^{(5)}	14–4	
Feb 27	at Long Beach State*	No. 14	Mayfair Park Lakewood • Lakewood, CA (Long Beach State Invitational)	L 4–5	14–5	
Feb 28	vs Southern Utah*	No. 14	Mayfair Park Lakewood • Lakewood, CA (Long Beach State Invitational)	W 9–1 ^{(5)}	15–5	
Feb 28	vs Portland State*	No. 14	Mayfair Park Lakewood • Lakewood, CA (Long Beach State Invitational)	W 10–1 ^{(5)}	16–5	

March
Date	Opponent	Rank	Site/stadium	Score	Overall record	Pac-12 record
Mar 1	vs Northwestern*	No. 14	Mayfair Park Lakewood • Lakewood, CA (Long Beach State Invitational)	W 8–2	17–5	
Mar 6	Providence*	No. 15	Easton Stadium • Los Angeles, CA (Stacy Winsberg Memorial Tournament)	W 7–1	18–5	
Mar 6	Illinois*	No. 15	Easton Stadium • Los Angeles, CA (Stacy Winsberg Memorial Tournament)	W 14–0 ^{(5)}	19–5	
Mar 7	Illinois*	No. 15	Easton Stadium • Los Angeles, CA (Stacy Winsberg Memorial Tournament)	W 9–2	20–5	
Mar 7	UC Davis*	No. 15	Easton Stadium • Los Angeles, CA (Stacy Winsberg Memorial Tournament)	W 8–0 ^{(6)}	21–5	
Mar 8	UC Davis*	No. 15	Easton Stadium • Los Angeles, CA (Stacy Winsberg Memorial Tournament)	W 10–2 ^{(6)}	22–5	
Mar 8	Providence*	No. 15	Easton Stadium • Los Angeles, CA (Stacy Winsberg Memorial Tournament)	W 8–0 ^{(6)}	23–5	
Mar 10	Baylor*	No. 13	Easton Stadium • Los Angeles, CA	W 3–2	24–5	
Mar 13	Utah	No. 13	Easton Stadium • Los Angeles, CA	W 1–0	25–5	1–0
Mar 14	Utah	No. 13	Easton Stadium • Los Angeles, CA	W 4–2	26–5	2–0
Mar 15	Utah	No. 13	Easton Stadium • Los Angeles, CA	W 6–0	27–5	3–0
Mar 21	at No. 18 Washington	No. 11	Husky Softball Stadium • Seattle, WA	W 10–3	28–5	4–0
Mar 22	at No. 18 Washington	No. 11	Husky Softball Stadium • Seattle, WA	W 8–4	29–5	5–0
Mar 23	at No. 18 Washington	No. 10	Husky Softball Stadium • Seattle, WA	L 2–6	29–6	5–1
Mar 26	at Cal State Northridge*	No. 10	Matador Diamond • Northridge, CA	W 6–4 ^{(10)}	30–6	

April
Date	Opponent	Rank	Site/stadium	Score	Overall record	Pac-12 record
Apr 3	No. 1 Oregon	No. 10	Easton Stadium • Los Angeles, CA	W 8–1	31–6	6–1
Apr 4	No. 1 Oregon	No. 10	Easton Stadium • Los Angeles, CA	L 4–6	31–7	6–2
Apr 5	No. 1 Oregon	No. 10	Easton Stadium • Los Angeles, CA	L 0–10 ^{(5)}	31–8	6–3
Apr 8	Cal State Fullerton*	No. 10	Easton Stadium • Los Angeles, CA	W 9–1 ^{(5)}	32–8	
Apr 10	at Stanford	No. 10	Boyd & Jill Smith Family Stadium • Stanford, CA	W 12–4 ^{(6)}	33–8	7–3
Apr 11	at Stanford	No. 10	Boyd & Jill Smith Family Stadium • Stanford, CA	W 18–3 ^{(5)}	34–8	8–3
Apr 12	at Stanford	No. 10	Boyd & Jill Smith Family Stadium • Stanford, CA	W 10–2 ^{(6)}	35–8	9–3
Apr 17	California	No. 8	Easton Stadium • Los Angeles, CA	W 8–0 ^{(5)}	36–8	10–3
Apr 18	California	No. 8	Easton Stadium • Los Angeles, CA	W 5–3	37–8	11–3
Apr 19	California	No. 8	Easton Stadium • Los Angeles, CA	W 8–5	38–8	12–3
Apr 25	at Oregon State	No. 7	Oregon State Softball Complex • Corvallis, OR	W 12–2	39–8	13–3
Apr 26	at Oregon State	No. 7	Oregon State Softball Complex • Corvallis, OR	W 11–6	40–8	14–3
Apr 27	at Oregon State	No. 7	Oregon State Softball Complex • Corvallis, OR	W 6–2	41–8	15–3

May
Date	Opponent	Rank	Site/stadium	Score	Overall record	Pac-12 record
May 1	No. 16 Arizona	No. 7	Easton Stadium • Los Angeles, CA	W 9–1 ^{(5)}	42–8	16–3
May 2	No. 16 Arizona	No. 7	Easton Stadium • Los Angeles, CA	W 6–3	43–8	17–3
May 3	No. 16 Arizona	No. 7	Easton Stadium • Los Angeles, CA	W 15–7 ^{(5)}	44–8	18–3
May 7	at No. 24 Arizona State	No. 6	Alberta B. Farrington Softball Stadium • Tempe, AZ	L 7–8	44–9	18–4
May 8	at No. 24 Arizona State	No. 6	Alberta B. Farrington Softball Stadium • Tempe, AZ	W 11–5	45–9	19–4
May 9	at No. 24 Arizona State	No. 6	Alberta B. Farrington Softball Stadium • Tempe, AZ	L 10–11	45–10	19–5

Postseason

NCAA Los Angeles Regional
Date	Opponent	Rank	Site/stadium	Score	Overall record	NCAAT record
May 15	Cal State Northridge	No. 7	Easton Stadium • Los Angeles, CA	W 9–1 ^{(5)}	46–10	1–0
May 16	Texas	No. 7	Easton Stadium • Los Angeles, CA	W 4–1	47–10	2–0
May 17	San Diego State	No. 7	Easton Stadium • Los Angeles, CA	W 8–0 ^{(6)}	48–10	3–0

NCAA Los Angeles Super Regional
Date	Opponent	Rank (Seed)	Site/stadium	Score	Overall record	NCAAT record
May 23	No. 12 (10) Missouri	No. 7 (7)	Easton Stadium • Los Angeles, CA	W 7–4	49–10	1–0
May 24	No. 12 (10) Missouri	No. 7 (7)	Easton Stadium • Los Angeles, CA	W 10–6	50–10	2–0

NCAA Women's College World Series
Date	Opponent	Rank (Seed)	Site/stadium	Score	Overall record	WCWS Record
May 28	No. 1 (2) Oregon	No. 7 (7)	ASA Hall of Fame Stadium • Oklahoma City, OK	W 7–1	51–10	1–0
May 29	No. 3 (3) Michigan	No. 7 (7)	ASA Hall of Fame Stadium • Oklahoma City, OK	L 4–10	51–11	1–1
May 30	No. 4 (4) Auburn	No. 7 (7)	ASA Hall of Fame Stadium • Oklahoma City, OK	L 10–11 ^{(10)}	51–12	1–2
