= 2015 Florida Gators softball team =

American college softball season

2015 Florida Gators softball
- Conference: Southeastern Conference
- East
- Record: 60-7 (19-5 SEC)
- Head coach: Tim Walton
- Assistant coach: Kenny Gajewski, Jennifer Rocha
- Home stadium: Katie Seashole Pressly Softball Stadium

2015 Southeastern Conference softball standings
	Conf.				Overall
Team	W		L	PCT	W		L	PCT
No. 2 Florida ‍†‍‍^{y}	18	–	5	.783	50	–	6	.893
No. 4 Auburn ‍‍‡‍^{y}	18	–	6	.750	49	–	9	.845
No. 5 Alabama ‍‍‍^{y}	17	–	7	.708	42	–	12	.778
No. 8 LSU ‍‍‍^{y}	15	–	9	.625	44	–	11	.800
No. 10 Tennessee ‍‍‍^{y}	15	–	9	.625	42	–	14	.750
No. 14 Georgia ‍‍‍^{y}	14	–	9	.609	40	–	14	.741
No. 12 Missouri ‍‍‍^{y}	14	–	10	.583	39	–	14	.736
No. 24 Texas A&M ‍‍‍^{y}	12	–	12	.500	38	–	18	.679
South Carolina ‍‍‍^{y}	10	–	14	.417	37	–	20	.649
Mississippi State ‍‍‍^{y}	10	–	14	.417	35	–	18	.660
Ole Miss ‍‍‍	6	–	18	.250	30	–	25	.545
Kentucky ‍‍‍^{y}	5	–	19	.208	29	–	24	.547
Arkansas ‍‍‍	1	–	23	.042	16	–	37	.302
† – Conference champion ‡ – Tournament champion y – Invited to the NCAA tournament As of May 12, 2015; Rankings from USA Today/NFCA Coaches

The 2015 Florida Gators softball team represented the University of Florida softball program during the 2015 NCAA Division I softball season. The Gators defeated Michigan in three games in the final of the 2015 Women's College World Series, clinching back-to-back titles for the program. Lauren Haeger was named Most Outstanding Player of the WCWS.

== Roster ==
The 2015 Florida Gators softball team has 6 seniors, 5 juniors, 3 sophomores, and 6 freshmen.

#	Name	Position	Height	B/T	Year	Hometown
1	Aubree Munro	C	5-9		Jr	Brea, CA
4	Jessica Damico	UT	5-4		Sr	Gary Summit, MO
6	Kathlyn Medina	INF	5-4		Sr	Downey, CA
7	Kelsey Stewart	INF	5-6		Jr	Wichtia, KS
8	Aleshia Ocasio	UT	5-9		Fr	St. Cloud, FL
12	Taylore Fuller	UT	5-7		Jr	Trenton, FL
16	Becca Shipper	UT	5-5		Fr	Magnolia, DE
17	Lauren Haeger	RHP/1B	5-11		Sr	Peoria, AZ
19	Chelsea Herndon	UT	5-7		So	Carrollton, TX
20	Francesca Martinez	OF	5-5		Sr	Centreville, VA
21	Kayli Kavistad	UT	5-8		Fr	Lake City, FL
22	Megan Reed	OF	5-8		Fr	Seffner, FL
23	Nicole Dewitt	IF	5-6		Fr	Garden Grove, CA
24	Kirsti Merritt	OF	5-4		Jr	Lake Panasoffkee, FL
25	Janell Wheaton	C/1B	5-7		Fr	San Dimas, CA
33	Delanie Gourley	LHP	5-4		So	Lakeside, CA
49	Taylor Schwarz	1B	5-9		Jr	Palm Beach Gardens, FL
52	Justine McLean	OF	5-3		So	Rancho Cucamonga, CA
55	Briana Little	UT	5-4		Sr	Middleburg, FL
88	Bailey Castro	INF	5-17		Sr	Pembroke Pines, FL

== Schedule ==
Legend
	Florida win
	Florida loss
	Postponement
**Bold**	Florida team member

=== Regular season ===
Regular season
Date	Opponent	Rank	Stadium Site	Score	Win	Loss	Save	Attendance	Overall record	SEC record
February 6, 2015	Hampton	#1	USF Softball Stadium; Tampa, FL	17–0	**Haeger** (1–0)	Jackson (0–2)	None	459	1–0	–
February 7, 2015	#8 Michigan	#1	USF Softball Stadium	2–1	**Ocasio** (1–0)	Wagner (0–1)	None	1,167	2–0	–
February 7, 2015	Illinois State	#1	USF Softball Stadium	8–0	**Gourley** (1–0)	Vissering (0–1)	None	867	3–0	–
February 8, 2015	Jacksonville	#1	USF Softball Stadium	9–0	**Haeger** (2–0)	Rossman (1–1)	None	1,033	4–0	–
February 8, 2015	at USF	#1	USF Softball Stadium	10–5	**Ocasio** (2–0)	Nunn (1–1)	None	1,687	5–0	–
February 11, 2015	at Jacksonville	#1	The Debbie & Fred Pruitt Softball Complex; Jacksonville, FL	16–1	**Haeger** (3–0)	Brown (1–3)	None	633	6–0	–
February 13, 2015	NC State	#1	Katie Seashole Pressly Stadium; Gainesville, FL	1–0	**Ocasio** (3–0)	Weiman (1–3)	None	630	7–0	–
February 14, 2015	NC State	#1	Katie Seashole Pressly Stadium	5–3	**Gourley** (2–0)	Mirabella (1–2)	**Ocasio** (1)	1,565	8–0	–
February 14, 2015	Iowa	#1	Katie Seashole Pressly Stadium	8–0	**Haeger** (4–0)	Yoways (1–2)	None		9–0	–
February 15, 2015	Iowa	#1	Katie Seashole Pressly Stadium	8–0	**Gourley** (3–0)	Starkenburg (2–3)	None	450	10–0	–
February 15, 2015	NC State	#1	Katie Seashole Pressly Stadium	3–0	**Haeger** (5–0)				11–0	–
February 20, 2015	Liberty	#1	Katie Seashole Pressly Stadium	11–0	**Haeger** (6–0)				12–0	–
February 21, 2015	Illinois State	#1	Katie Seashole Pressly Stadium	4–1	**Ocasio** (4–0)				13–0	–
February 21, 2015	Kansas	#1	Katie Seashole Pressly Stadium	7–1	**Haeger** (7–0)				14–0	–
February 22, 2015	Mercer	#1	Katie Seashole Pressly Stadium	20–3	**Gourley** (4–0)	Stevens (3–5)	None	630	15–0	–
February 22, 2015	Mercer	#1	Katie Seashole Pressly Stadium	10–3	**Haeger** (8–0)				16–0	–
February 25, 2015	#15 UCF	#1	Katie Seashole Pressly Stadium	2–1	**Ocasio** (5–0)				17–0	–
February 27, 2015	#2 Oregon	#1	SDSU Softball Stadium; San Diego, CA	3–0	**Gourley** (5–0)				18–0	–
February 27, 2015	Cal Poly	#1	SDSU Softball Stadium	6–1	**Haeger** (9–0)				19–0	–
February 28, 2015	UC Davis	#1	USD Softball Complex; San Diego, CA	9–0	**Gourley** (6–0)				20–0	–
February 28, 2015	at San Diego	#1	USD Softball Complex	8–0	**Ocasio** (6–0)	Von Sprecken (7–3)	None	384	21–0	–
March 2015	at San Diego State				Canceled (rain)				–	–
March 2015	Long Beach State	#1	49er Softball Complex; Long Beach, CA	10–1					22–0	–
March 2015	#3 Michigan	#1	Anderson Family Field; Fullerton, CA	7–4					23–0	–
March 2015	San Jose State	#1	Anderson Family Field	9–1					24–0	–
March 2015	#13 Arizona	#1	Anderson Family Field	10–0					25–0	–
March 2015	#2 Oregon	#1	Anderson Family Field	5–1					26–0	–
March 2015	Fresno State	#1	Anderson Family Field	4–1					27–0	–
March 2015	#3 LSU	#1	Katie Seashole Pressly Stadium	4–3					28–0	1–0
March 2015	#3 LSU	#1	Katie Seashole Pressly Stadium	10–14					28–1	1–1
March 2015	#3 LSU	#1	Katie Seashole Pressly Stadium	3–10					28–2	1–2
March 2015	at #4 Alabama	#2	Rhoads Stadium; Tuscaloosa, AL	1–0					29–2	2–2
March 2015	at #4 Alabama	#2	Rhoads Stadium	4–1					30–2	3–2
March 2015	at #4 Alabama	#2	Rhoads Stadium	1–5					30–3	3–3
March 2015	at Mississippi State	#2	Mississippi State Softball Field; Starkville, MS	3–2					31–3	4–3
March 2015	at Mississippi State	#2	Mississippi State Softball Field	16–2					32–3	5–3
March 2015	at Mississippi State	#2	Mississippi State Softball Field	3–5					32–4	5–4
April 2015	North Florida	#3	Katie Seashole Pressly Stadium	2–1					33–4	5–4
April 2015	South Carolina	#3	Katie Seashole Pressly Stadium	10–2					34–4	6–4
April 2015	South Carolina	#3	Katie Seashole Pressly Stadium	19–0					35–4	7–4
April 2015	South Carolina	#3	Katie Seashole Pressly Stadium	16–3					36–4	8–4
April 2015	at #8 Florida State	#3	JoAnne Graf Field; Tallahassee, FL	5–1					37–4	8–4
April 2015	#13 Kentucky	#3	Katie Seashole Pressly Stadium	1–0					38–4	9–4
April 2015	#13 Kentucky	#3	Katie Seashole Pressly Stadium	6–3					39–4	10–4
April 2015	#13 Kentucky	#3	Katie Seashole Pressly Stadium	2–0					40–4	11–4
April 2015	South Florida	#2	Katie Seashole Pressly Stadium	7–0					41–4	11–4
April 2015	at #11 Georgia	#2	Jack Turner Stadium; Athens, GA	8–4					42–4	12–4
April 2015	at #11 Georgia	#2	Jack Turner Stadium	4–3					43–4	13–4
April 2015	at Georgia				Canceled (rain)				–	–
April 2015	#10 Florida State	#1	Katie Seashole Pressly Stadium	5–0					44–4	13–4
April 2015	#25 Texas A&M	#1	Katie Seashole Pressly Stadium	7–3					45–4	14–4
April 2015	#25 Texas A&M	#1	Katie Seashole Pressly Stadium	9–5					46–4	15–4
April 2015	#25 Texas A&M	#1	Katie Seashole Pressly Stadium	9–1					47–4	16–4
May 1, 2015	at #11 Missouri	#1	University Field; Columbia, MO	7–6	**Gourley** (10–1)	Finucane (18–7)	None	1,807	48–4	17–4
May 2, 2015	at #11 Missouri	#1	University Field	9–6	**Ocasio** (16–3)	Finucane (18–8)	**Gourley** (4)	2,325	49–4	18–4
May 3, 2015	at #11 Missouri	#1	University Field	2–3	**Lowary** (18–4)	Gourley (10–2)	None	1,702	49–5	18–5

=== Postseason ===
Postseason
Tournament	Date	Opponent	Rank	Stadium Site	Score	Win	Loss	Save	Attendance	Overall record	SEC record
2015 SEC softball tournament	May 2015	South Carolina	#2 (1)	Tiger Park; Baton Rouge, LA	10–1	**Haeger** (24–0)	Sarratt (17–12)	None		50–5	1–0
2015 SEC softball tournament	May 2015	#11 Tennessee	#2 (1)	Tiger Park	1–2	**Gabriel** (15–6)	Haeger (24–1)	**Gaffin** (2)	1,769	50–6	1–1
2015 NCAA Division I softball tournament	May 15, 2015	Florida A&M	#2 (1)	Katie Seashole Pressly Stadium	6-0	**Ocasio** (17–3)	Burse (3–19)	None	1,630	51–6	1–0
2015 NCAA Division I softball tournament	May 16, 2015	Hofstra	#2 (1)	Katie Seashole Pressly Stadium	7-0	**Haeger** (25–1)	Pirone (19–11)	None	1,224	52–6	2–0
2015 NCAA Division I softball tournament	May 17, 2015	Florida Atlantic	#2 (1)	Katie Seashole Pressly Stadium	1-0	**Haeger** (26–1)	Wilson (8–5)	None	1,404	53–6	3–0
2015 NCAA Division I softball tournament	May 23, 2015	#25 Kentucky	#1 (1)	Katie Seashole Pressly Stadium	7-0	**Haeger** (27–1)	Nunley (14–15)	None	1,739	54–6	1–0
2015 NCAA Division I softball tournament	May 24, 2015	#25 Kentucky	#1 (1)	Katie Seashole Pressly Stadium	1-0	**Haeger** (28–1)	Nunley (14–16)	None	1,939	55–6	2–0
2015 Women's College World Series	May 28, 2015	#8 (8) Tennessee	#1 (1)	ASA Hall of Fame Stadium; Oklahoma City, OK	7–2	**Haeger** (29–1)	Gaffin (17–4)	None		56–6	1–0
2015 Women's College World Series	May 29, 2015	#5 (5) LSU	#1 (1)	ASA Hall of Fame Stadium	4–0	**Haeger** (30–1)	Hoover (18–6)	None		57–6	2–0
2015 Women's College World Series	May 31, 2015	#4 (4) Auburn	#1 (1)	ASA Hall of Fame Stadium	3–2	**Haeger** (31–1)	Davis (26–3)	None		58–6	3–0
2015 Women's College World Series	June 1, 2015	#3 (3) Michigan	#1 (1)	ASA Hall of Fame Stadium	3–2	**Ocasio** (18–3)	Betsa (31–5)	**Gourley**	8,329	59–6	4–0
2015 Women's College World Series	June 2, 2015	#3 (3) Michigan	#1 (1)	ASA Hall of Fame Stadium	0–1	**Wagner** (25–2)	Haeger (31–2)	None	8,254	59–7	4–1
2015 Women's College World Series	June 3, 2015	#3 (3) Michigan	#1 (1)	ASA Hall of Fame Stadium	4–1	**Haeger** (32–2)	Wagner (25–3)	None	7,680	60–7	5–1

== Ranking movement ==
Poll	Last	Pre	Wk 1	Wk 2	Wk 3	Wk 4	Wk 5	Wk 6	Wk 7	Wk 8	Wk 9	Wk 10	Wk 11	Wk 12	Wk 13	Wk 14	Wk 15	Final
NFCA	1*	1	1	1	1	1	1*	3	3	3	3	2	1	1	2	2	2	1*
USA Softball	1*	1	1	1	1	1	1	2	2	3	3	2	1	1	2	2	1	1*
* Indicates unanimous selection.
