= 2015 Alabama Crimson Tide softball team =

American college softball season

2015 Alabama Crimson Tide softball

Women's College World Series, T-5th
- Conference: Southeastern Conference
- West
- Record: 48–15 (17–7 SEC)
- Head coach: Patrick Murphy
- Assistant coach: Alyson Habetz
- Pitching coach: Stephanie VanBrakle
- Home stadium: Rhoads Stadium

2015 Southeastern Conference softball standings
	Conf.				Overall
Team	W		L	PCT	W		L	PCT
No. 2 Florida ‍†‍‍^{y}	18	–	5	.783	50	–	6	.893
No. 4 Auburn ‍‍‡‍^{y}	18	–	6	.750	49	–	9	.845
No. 5 Alabama ‍‍‍^{y}	17	–	7	.708	42	–	12	.778
No. 8 LSU ‍‍‍^{y}	15	–	9	.625	44	–	11	.800
No. 10 Tennessee ‍‍‍^{y}	15	–	9	.625	42	–	14	.750
No. 14 Georgia ‍‍‍^{y}	14	–	9	.609	40	–	14	.741
No. 12 Missouri ‍‍‍^{y}	14	–	10	.583	39	–	14	.736
No. 24 Texas A&M ‍‍‍^{y}	12	–	12	.500	38	–	18	.679
South Carolina ‍‍‍^{y}	10	–	14	.417	37	–	20	.649
Mississippi State ‍‍‍^{y}	10	–	14	.417	35	–	18	.660
Ole Miss ‍‍‍	6	–	18	.250	30	–	25	.545
Kentucky ‍‍‍^{y}	5	–	19	.208	29	–	24	.547
Arkansas ‍‍‍	1	–	23	.042	16	–	37	.302
† – Conference champion ‡ – Tournament champion y – Invited to the NCAA tournament As of May 12, 2015; Rankings from USA Today/NFCA Coaches

The 2015 Alabama Crimson Tide softball team was an American softball team that represented the University of Alabama for the 2015 NCAA softball season. The Crimson Tide played their home games at Rhoads Stadium. After losing in the 2014 Women's College World Series, the 2015 team looked to make the postseason for the 17th straight year, and the Women's College World Series for tenth time. This season represented the 19th season of softball in the school's history.

== Roster ==
2015 Alabama Crimson Tide roster
Pitchers: 23 Leslie Jury – Senior; 27 Alexis Osorio – Freshman; 28 Sydney Littlejohn – Sophomore; Outfielders: 4 Rachel Bobo – Freshman; 7 Kayla Rettig – Freshman; 8 Haylie McCleney – Junior; 18 Andrea Hawkins – Junior; Utility: 5 Chandler Dare – Sophomore; 12 Kallie Case – Junior; 17 Jadyn Spencer – Senior; 19 Danielle Richard – Senior	Catchers: 20 Carrigan Fain – Freshman; 21 Chaunsey Bell – Senior; Infielders: 2 Demi Turner – Freshman; 3 Peyton Grantham – Freshman; 9 Marisa Runyon – Freshman; 15 Danae Hays – Junior; 24 Leona Lafaele – Sophomore

2015 Alabama Crimson Tide Softball Roster

== Schedule ==
Date	Time	Opponent	Rank^{#}	Site	Result	Attendance	Winning Pitcher	Losing Pitcher
February 5*	6:00 PM	#23 South Alabama Jaguars	#3	Jaguar Field • Mobile, AL	W 2–1	1,088	A. Osorio	F. Beard
Sand Dollar Classic
February 6*	3:00 PM	Eastern Kentucky Colonels	#3	Gulf Shores Sportsplex • Gulf Shores, AL	W 8–0^{(5)}	273	S. Littlejohn	L. Pittsenbarger
February 6*	6:00 PM	Houston Cougars	#3	Gulf Shores Sportsplex • Gulf Shores, AL	W 6–2	386	A. Osorio	S. Groholski
February 7*	3:00 PM	FGCU Eagles	#3	Gulf Shores Sportsplex • Gulf Shores, AL	W 13–1^{(5)}	328	A. Osorio	T. Wade
February 7*	6:00 PM	FIU Panthers	#3	Gulf Shores Sportsplex • Gulf Shores, AL	W 11–2^{(5)}	328	L. Jury	S. Graves
February 8*	1:00 PM	McNeese State Cowgirls	#3	Gulf Shores Sportsplex • Gulf Shores, AL	W 4–0	428	S. Littlejohn	R. Smith
February 11*	6:00 PM	Samford Bulldogs	#3	Samford Softball Field • Birmingham, AL	W 7–1	841	L. Jury	M. Hanson
Stanford Nike Invitational
February 13*	2:30 PM	Pacific Tigers	#3	Smith Family Stadium • Stanford, CA	W 13–0^{(5)}	283	S. Littlejohn	M. Walters
February 13*	7:30 PM	Stanford Cardinal	#3	Smith Family Stadium • Stanford, CA	W 15–6	678	L. Jury	H. Snyder
February 14*	12:00 PM	Cal Poly Mustangs	#3	Smith Family Stadium • Stanford, CA	W 1–0^{(8)}	433	S. Littlejohn	S. Hyland
February 14*	2:30 PM	Stanford Cardinal	#3	Smith Family Stadium • Stanford, CA	L 1–4	721	H. Snyder	L. Jury
February 15*	11:00 AM	Pacific Tigers	#3	Smith Family Stadium • Stanford, CA	W 10–0^{(5)}	212	A. Osorio	C. Mortensen
February 17*	6:00 PM	UAB Blazers	#3	UAB Softball Field • Birmingham, AL	Canceled	–	–	–
Easton Bama Bash
February 20*	4:00 PM	#5 Michigan Wolverines	#3	Rhoads Stadium • Tuscaloosa, AL	L 2–8	2,514	M. Betsa	L. Jury
February 20*	6:00 PM	James Madison Dukes	#3	Rhoads Stadium • Tuscaloosa, AL	Canceled	–	–	–
February 21*	1:30 PM	#5 Michigan Wolverines	#3	Rhoads Stadium • Tuscaloosa, AL	L 1–4	2,710	H. Wagner	A. Osorio
February 21*	4:00 PM	James Madison Dukes	#3	Rhoads Stadium • Tuscaloosa, AL	W 6–4	2,837	S. Littlejohn	H. Kiefer
February 22*	1:30 PM	Lipscomb Bisons	#3	Rhoads Stadium • Tuscaloosa, AL	W 6–1	2,395	A. Osorio	T. Sanders
February 25*	5:00 PM	Jacksonville St. Gamecocks	#4	University Field • Jacksonville, AL	Canceled	–	–	–
Easton Crimson Classic
February 28*	1:00 PM	#5 LA–Lafayette Ragin' Cajuns	#4	Rhoads Stadium • Tuscaloosa, AL	W 5–1	2,448	S. Littlejohn	C. Hamilton
February 28*	3:30 PM	#5 LA–Lafayette Ragin' Cajuns	#4	Rhoads Stadium • Tuscaloosa, AL	L 1–2	2,956	J. Wallace	A. Osorio
March 1*	1:30 PM	#5 LA–Lafayette Ragin' Cajuns	#4	Rhoads Stadium • Tuscaloosa, AL	W 3–2	2,724	S. Littlejohn	J. Wallace
March 6	6:30 PM	Ole Miss Rebels	#4	Rhoads Stadium • Tuscaloosa, AL	W 6–0	2,758	A. Osorio	E. Gaitan
March 7	2:00 PM	Ole Miss Rebels	#4	Rhoads Stadium • Tuscaloosa, AL	W 7–0	2,934	L. Jury	L. Lindsey
March 8	1:00 PM	Ole Miss Rebels	#4	Rhoads Stadium • Tuscaloosa, AL	W 10–0^{(5)}	2,811	S. Littlejohn	M. Osias
March 10*	6:00 PM	#25 UAB Blazers	#5	Rhoads Stadium • Tuscaloosa, AL	Canceled	–	–	–
March 14	2:00 PM	#8 Georgia Bulldogs	#5	Jack Turner Stadium • Athens, GA	W 7–4^{(9)}	1,801	A. Osorio	C. Wilkinson
March 14	4:00 PM	#8 Georgia Bulldogs	#5	Jack Turner Stadium • Athens, GA	L 6–7	1,384	B. Gray	S. Littlejohn
March 15	1:00 PM	#8 Georgia Bulldogs	#5	Jack Turner Stadium • Athens, GA	W 4–2	1,577	A. Osorio	B. Gray
March 18*	6:00 PM	Georgia State Panthers	#5	Rhoads Stadium • Tuscaloosa, AL	W 9–1^{(5)}	2,638	A. Osorio	T. Thorpe
March 21	1:00 PM	#3 Florida Gators	#5	Rhoads Stadium • Tuscaloosa, AL	L 0–1	3,276	L. Haeger	A. Osorio
March 23	3:30 PM	#3 Florida Gators	#5	Rhoads Stadium • Tuscaloosa, AL	L 1–4	3,841	A. Ocasio	L. Jury
March 23	6:00 PM	#3 Florida Gators	#5	Rhoads Stadium • Tuscaloosa, AL	W 5–1	3,244	A. Osorio	D. Gourley
March 25*	2:00 PM	Georgia Tech Yellow Jackets	#5	Rhoads Stadium • Tuscaloosa, AL	W 11–0^{(6)}	2,893	S. Littlejohn	K. Kleinschmidt
March 27	6:30 PM	#23 Texas A&M Aggies	#5	Rhoads Stadium • Tuscaloosa, AL	W 13–0^{(5)}	2,660	A. Osorio	R. Fox
March 28	2:00 PM	#23 Texas A&M Aggies	#5	Rhoads Stadium • Tuscaloosa, AL	W 8–5	3,093	S. Littlejohn	R. Fox
March 29	1:30 PM	#23 Texas A&M Aggies	#5	Rhoads Stadium • Tuscaloosa, AL	L 5–11	3,128	K. Marks	A. Osorio
March 31*	6:00 PM	MVSU Delta Devilettes	#5	Rhoads Stadium • Tuscaloosa, AL	W 17–0^{(5)}	2,317	L. Jury	S. Coe
April 1*	6:00 PM	Southern Miss Golden Eagles	#5	Rhoads Stadium • Tuscaloosa, AL	W 12–1^{(5)}	2,645	S. Littlejohn	S. Rodgers
April 4	11:00 AM	#13 Kentucky Wildcats	#5	John Cropp Stadium • Lexington, KY	L 1–2	–	M. Prince	A. Osorio
April 4	3:00 PM	#13 Kentucky Wildcats	#5	John Cropp Stadium • Lexington, KY	W 7–3	1,951	S. Littlejohn	K. Nunley
April 4	2:30 PM	#13 Kentucky Wildcats	#5	John Cropp Stadium • Lexington, KY	W 2–0	1,467	A. Osorio	K. Nunley
April 7*	6:00 PM	UAB Blazers	#6	UAB Softball Field • Birmingham, AL	W 10–0^{(5)}	689	L. Jury	M. Smith
April 8*	6:30 PM	Middle Tennessee Blue Raiders	#6	Wilson Morgan Park • Decatur, AL	W 11–0^{(5)}	2,145	S. Littlejohn	K. Cheney
April 14*	6:00 PM	UAB Blazers	#6	Rhoads Stadium • Tuscaloosa, AL	W 14–1^{(5)}	2,243	S. Littlejohn	M. Hir
April 15*	6:00 PM	NC State Wolfpack	#6	Rhoads Stadium • Tuscaloosa, AL	W 2–0	2,461	L. Jury	E. Weiman
April 17	7:30 PM	#7 Auburn Tigers	#6	Jane B. Moore Field • Auburn, AL	W 6–0	1,709	A. Osorio	R. Walters
April 18	5:00 PM	#7 Auburn Tigers	#6	Jane B. Moore Field • Auburn, AL	W 13–3	1,900	A. Osorio	L. Davis
April 18	7:00 PM	#7 Auburn Tigers	#6	Jane B. Moore Field • Auburn, AL	L 12–13^{(8)}	2,006	L. Davis	A. Osorio
April 21*	6:00 PM	Troy Trojans	#5	Rhoads Stadium • Tuscaloosa, AL	W 5–2	2,494	L. Jury	J. Affeldt
April 23	7:00 PM	#11 Tennessee Lady Volunteers	#5	Rhoads Stadium • Tuscaloosa, AL	L 2–3	2,747	E. Gabriel	A. Osorio
April 24	6:30 PM	#11 Tennessee Lady Volunteers	#5	Rhoads Stadium • Tuscaloosa, AL	W 3–1	3,159	L. Jury	C. Tarango
April 25	2:00 PM	#11 Tennessee Lady Volunteers	#5	Rhoads Stadium • Tuscaloosa, AL	W 10–3	3,940	A. Osorio	E. Gabriel
May 1	6:00 PM	Arkansas Razorbacks	#4	Bogle Park • Fayetteville, AR	W 9–1	565	A. Osorio	G. Moll
May 2	8:00 PM	Arkansas Razorbacks	#4	Bogle Park • Fayetteville, AR	W 14–2	1,234	L. Jury	G. Moll
May 3	2:00 PM	Arkansas Razorbacks	#4	Bogle Park • Fayetteville, AR	W 1–0	1,004	S. Littlejohn	H. Meinen
SEC Tournament
May 7	12:30 PM	#14 Georgia Bulldogs	#4	Tiger Park • Baton Rouge, LA	W 2–1	1,663	A. Osorio	B. Gray
May 8	2:00 PM	#7 Auburn Tigers	#4	Tiger Park • Baton Rouge, LA	L 1–7	1,769	M. Harper	L. Jury
NCAA Tuscaloosa Regional
May 15	3:00 PM	#20 Fairfield Stags	#5	Rhoads Stadium • Tuscaloosa, AL	W 8–0^{(6)}	1,773	A. Osorio	L. Falkanger
May 16	11:00 AM	#20 Washington Huskies	#5	Rhoads Stadium • Tuscaloosa, AL	W 9–0^{(5)}	1,817	A. Osorio	K. Thomas
May 17	12:00 PM	#20 Washington Huskies	#5	Rhoads Stadium • Tuscaloosa, AL	W 11–1	1,597	A. Osorio	K. Stanchek
NCAA Tuscaloosa Super Regional
May 22	6:00 PM	#11 Oklahoma Sooners	#5	Rhoads Stadium • Tuscaloosa, AL	L 2–5	3,043	A. Osorio	P. Parker
May 23	4:00 PM	#11 Oklahoma Sooners	#5	Rhoads Stadium • Tuscaloosa, AL	W 2–0	–	A. Osorio	P. Parker
May 23	7:00 PM	#11 Oklahoma Sooners	#5	Rhoads Stadium • Tuscaloosa, AL	W 5–3	3,940	A. Osorio	P. Parker
NCAA Women's College World Series
May 28	7:00 PM	#3 Michigan Wolverines	#6	ASA Hall of Fame Stadium • Oklahoma City, OK	L 0–5	8,360	M. Betsa	A. Osorio
May 30	2:00 PM	#2 Oregon Ducks	#6	ASA Hall of Fame Stadium • Oklahoma City, OK	W 2–1	9,094	A. Osorio	C. Hawkins
May 30	10:45 PM	#11 LSU Tigers	#5	ASA Hall of Fame Stadium • {{{site_cityst}}}	L	9,515	A. Walljasper	S. Littlejohn
*Non-Conference Game. ^{#}Rankings from NFCA released prior to game.All times are in Central Time Zone.

== Honors and awards ==
- Haylie McCleney was selected Preaseson All-SEC Team.
- Sydney Littlejohn was selected as the SEC Pitcher of the Week on February 9.
- Haylie McCleney was selected as the SEC Player of the Week on February 16.
- Sydney Littlejohn was selected as the SEC Pitcher of the Week on March 9.
- Demi Turner was selected as the SEC Freshman of the Week on March 16.
- Demi Turner was selected as the SEC Freshman of the Week on March 30.
- Leslie Jury was selected as the SEC Pitcher of the Week on April 27.
- Alexis Osorio was selected as the SEC Freshman of the Year.
- Haylie McCleney was selected as the SEC Scholar-Athlete of the Year.
- Haylie McCleney and Alexis Osorio were selected as First Team All-SEC.
- Marisa Runyon and Demi Turner were selected as Second Team All-SEC.

== Ranking movement ==
Poll	Pre	Wk 1	Wk 2	Wk 3	Wk 4	Wk 5	Wk 6	Wk 7	Wk 8	Wk 9	Wk 10	Wk 11	Wk 12	Wk 13	Wk 14	Final
NFCA	3	3	3	4	4	5	5	5	5	6	6	5	4	4		
USA Softball	4	4	5	5	5	5	4	5	6	7	7	6	6	5		

== See also ==
- 2015 Alabama Crimson Tide baseball team
