= 2015 SEC softball tournament =

2015 Southeastern Conference softball tournament
- Teams: 12
- Finals site: Tiger Park; Baton Rouge, LA
- Champions: Auburn (1st title)
- Runner-up: Tennessee (3rd title game)
- Winning coach: Clint Myers (1st title)
- MVP: Emily Carasone (Auburn)
- Television: SECN; ESPNU; ESPN

The 2015 SEC softball tournament was held at Tiger Park on the campus of Louisiana State University in Baton Rouge, Louisiana from May 6 through May 9, 2015. The tournament winner earned the Southeastern Conference's automatic bid to the 2015 NCAA Division I softball tournament. The Championship game was broadcast on ESPN2 and the semifinals was broadcast on ESPNU, while all other SEC tournament games were live on the SEC Network.

In addition to the TV broadcast, the semifinals and championship were available to listen to online and through select radio stations via the SEC Radio Network.

2015 Southeastern Conference softball standings
	Conf.				Overall
Team	W		L	PCT	W		L	PCT
No. 2 Florida ‍†‍‍^{y}	18	–	5	.783	50	–	6	.893
No. 4 Auburn ‍‍‡‍^{y}	18	–	6	.750	49	–	9	.845
No. 5 Alabama ‍‍‍^{y}	17	–	7	.708	42	–	12	.778
No. 8 LSU ‍‍‍^{y}	15	–	9	.625	44	–	11	.800
No. 10 Tennessee ‍‍‍^{y}	15	–	9	.625	42	–	14	.750
No. 14 Georgia ‍‍‍^{y}	14	–	9	.609	40	–	14	.741
No. 12 Missouri ‍‍‍^{y}	14	–	10	.583	39	–	14	.736
No. 24 Texas A&M ‍‍‍^{y}	12	–	12	.500	38	–	18	.679
South Carolina ‍‍‍^{y}	10	–	14	.417	37	–	20	.649
Mississippi State ‍‍‍^{y}	10	–	14	.417	35	–	18	.660
Ole Miss ‍‍‍	6	–	18	.250	30	–	25	.545
Kentucky ‍‍‍^{y}	5	–	19	.208	29	–	24	.547
Arkansas ‍‍‍	1	–	23	.042	16	–	37	.302
† – Conference champion ‡ – Tournament champion y – Invited to the NCAA tournament As of May 12, 2015; Rankings from USA Today/NFCA Coaches

== Tournament ==
1st Round; May 6th SECN
8	Texas A&M	3
9	South Carolina	6
5	Tennessee	5
12	Kentucky	4
7	Missouri	9
10	Mississippi State	0^{(6)}
6	Georgia	11
11	Ole Miss	0^{(5)}

Quarterfinals; May 7th SECN
1	Florida	10
9	South Carolina	1^{(5)}
4	LSU	5
5	Tennessee	7
2	Auburn	5
7	Missouri	2
3	Alabama	2
6	Georgia	1

Semifinals; May 8th ESPNU
1	Florida	1
5	Tennessee	2
2	Auburn	7
3	Alabama	1

Finals; May 9th ESPN2
5	Tennessee	5
2	Auburn	6^{(9)}

- Vanderbilt does not sponsor a softball team.
- All times listed are Central Daylight Time.

== Schedule ==
Game	Time*	Matchup^{#}	Television	TV Announcers	Radio Announcers	Attendance
First Round – Wednesday, May 6
1	11:00 a.m.	#7 Missouri vs. #10 Mississippi State	SEC Network	Adam Amin, Amanda Scarborough, & Laura Rutledge		1,550
2	1:30 p.m.	#6 Georgia vs. #11 Ole Miss	SEC Network	Adam Amin, Amanda Scarborough, & Laura Rutledge		1,550
3	4:00 p.m.	#8 Texas A&M vs. #9 South Carolina	SEC Network	Beth Mowins, Jessica Mendoza, Michele Smith, & Holly Rowe		1,550
4	6:30 p.m.	#5 Tennessee vs. #12 Kentucky	SEC Network	Beth Mowins, Jessica Mendoza, Michele Smith, & Holly Rowe		1,550
Quarterfinals – Thursday, May 7
5	10:00 a.m.	#2 Auburn vs. #7 Missouri	SEC Network	Adam Amin, Amanda Scarborough, & Laura Rutledge		1,973
6	12:30 p.m.	#3 Alabama vs. #6 Georgia	SEC Network	Adam Amin, Amanda Scarborough, & Laura Rutledge		1,973
7	3:00 p.m.	#1 Florida vs. #9 South Carolina	SEC Network	Beth Mowins, Jessica Mendoza, Michele Smith, & Holly Rowe		1,973
8	5:30 p.m.	#4 LSU vs. #5 Tennessee	SEC Network	Beth Mowins, Jessica Mendoza, Michele Smith, & Holly Rowe		1,973
Semifinals – Friday, May 8
9	2:00 p.m.	#2 Auburn vs. #3 Alabama	ESPNU	Beth Mowins, Jessica Mendoza, Michele Smith, & Holly Rowe	Dan Wolfgang	1,769
10	4:30 p.m.	#1 Florida vs. #5 Tennessee	ESPNU	Beth Mowins, Jessica Mendoza, Michele Smith, & Holly Rowe	Dan Wolfgang	1,769
Championship – Saturday, May 9
11	7:00 p.m.	#5 Tennessee vs. #2 Auburn	ESPN2	Beth Mowins, Jessica Mendoza, Michele Smith, & Holly Rowe	Dan Wolfgang	1,853
*Game times in CDT. # – Rankings denote tournament seed.
