= 2025 Southeastern Conference softball season =

2025 SEC Softball Season
- League: NCAA Division I
- Sport: Softball
- Number of teams: 15

Regular season
- Champions: Oklahoma

Tournament

Softball seasons
- ← 2024 2026 →

2025 Southeastern Conference softball standings
	Conf.						Overall
Team	W		L		T	PCT	W		L		T	PCT
No. 3 Oklahoma ‍†‍‡‍^{y}	17	–	7	–	0	.708	52	–	9	–	0	.852
No. 14 Texas A&M ‍‍‡‍^{y}	16	–	7	–	0	.696	48	–	11	–	0	.814
No. 1 Texas ‍‍‍^{y}	16	–	8	–	0	.667	56	–	12	–	0	.824
No. 4 Tennessee ‍‍‍^{y}	15	–	9	–	0	.625	47	–	17	–	1	.731
No. 9 Arkansas ‍‍‍^{y}	14	–	10	–	0	.583	44	–	14	–	0	.759
No. 7 Florida ‍‍‍^{y}	14	–	10	–	0	.583	48	–	17	–	0	.738
No. 12 South Carolina ‍‍‍^{y}	13	–	11	–	0	.542	44	–	16	–	0	.733
No. 21 Mississippi State ‍‍‍^{y}	13	–	11	–	0	.542	39	–	19	–	0	.672
No. 19 LSU ‍‍‍^{y}	12	–	12	–	0	.500	42	–	16	–	0	.724
No. 15 Alabama ‍‍‍^{y}	12	–	12	–	0	.500	40	–	23	–	0	.635
No. 8 Ole Miss ‍‍‍^{y}	11	–	13	–	0	.458	42	–	21	–	0	.667
No. 22Georgia ‍‍‍^{y}	7	–	16	–	0	.304	35	–	23	–	0	.603
Kentucky ‍‍‍^{y}	7	–	17	–	0	.292	31	–	28	–	0	.525
Auburn ‍‍‍^{y}	6	–	18	–	0	.250	34	–	23	–	0	.596
Missouri ‍‍‍	6	–	18	–	0	.250	25	–	31	–	0	.446
† – Conference champion ‡ – Tournament champion y – Invited to the NCAA tournament As of June 6, 2025; Rankings from NFCA/GoRout

The 2025 SEC softball season began play Thursday, February 6, and conference play began on Friday, March 7. The 2025 Southeastern Conference softball tournament took place May 6–10 at Turner Softball Stadium in Athens, Georgia. Vanderbilt University does not have a softball program.

== SEC preseason poll ==
The head coaches SEC preseason poll was released on January 30, 2025. Each head coach votes on a scale of 14 points for first place descending to 1 point for last place, 14th. Each coach only votes for 14 teams, since they can not vote for their own team. Newcomers, Texas and Oklahoma, were picked to finish 1st and 3rd, respectively. Texas, Florida, who finished 2nd, and Oklahoma were the only teams receiving 1st place votes,receiving 7, 6, and 2 1st place votes, respectively.

Preseason poll
Predicted finish	Team
1	Texas
2	Florida
3	Oklahoma
4	Tennessee
5	Texas A&M
6	LSU
7	Arkansas
8	Georgia
9	Missouri
10	Alabama
11	Kentucky
12	Mississippi State
13	Auburn
14	Ole Miss
15	South Carolina

== Record vs. conference opponents ==
. Blank are not scheduled. Blue are home games, otherwise away.

2025 SEC softball records Source: 2025 SEC softball game results, 2025 SEC softball schedule
Tm	W–L	ALA	ARK	AUB	FLA	UGA	KEN	LSU	MSU	MIZ	OKL	OMS	SCA	TEN	TEX	TAM	Tm	SR	SW
ALA	12–12		.	.	1–2	2–1	.	1–2	1–2	3–0	2–1	.	1–2	.	.	1–2	ALA	3–5	1–0
ARK	14–10	.		.	2–1	.	3–0	2–1	.	.	0–3	1–2	2–1	2–1	.	2–1	ARK	6–2	1–1
AUB	6–18	.	.		0–3	2–1	2–1	.	0–3	.	.	.	2–1	0–3	0–3	0–3	AUB	3–5	0–5
FLA	14–10	2–1	1–2	3–0		.	.	1–2	.	.	2–1	2–1	.	.	1–2	2–1	FLA	5–3	1–0
UGA	7–16	1–2	.	1–2	.		.	1–2	.	1–2	.	1–2	1–2	1–2	.	0–2	UGA	0–8	0–0
KEN	7–17	.	0–3	1–2	.	.		0–3	1–2	3–0	.	2–1	0–3	.	0–3	.	KEN	2–6	1–4
LSU	12–12	2–1	1–2	.	2–1	2–1	3–0		.	.	.	.	1–2	.	1–2	0–3	LSU	4–4	1–1
MSU	13–11	2–1	.	3–0	.	.	2–1	.		2–1	0–3	2–1	.	1–2	1–2	.	MSU	5–3	1–1
MIZ	6–18	0–3	.	.	.	2–1	0–3	.	1–2		1–2	1–2	.	.	0–3	1–2	MIZ	1–7	0–3
OKL	17–7	1–2	3–0	.	1–2	.	.	.	3–0	2–1		.	3–0	1–2	3–0	.	OKL	5–3	4–0
OMS	11–13	.	2–1	.	1–2	2–1	1–2	.	1–2	2–1	.		1–2	1–2	.	.	OMS	3–5	0–0
SCA	13–11	2–1	1–2	1–2	.	2–1	3–0	2–1	.	.	0–3	2–1		.	.	.	SCA	5–3	1–1
TEN	15–9	.	1–2	3–0	.	2–1	.	.	2–1	.	2–1	2–1	.		2–1	1–2	TEN	6–2	1–0
TEX	16–8	.	.	3–0	2–1	.	3–0	2–1	2–1	3–0	0–3	.	.	1–2		.	TEX	6–2	3–1
TAM	16–7	2–1	1–2	3–0	1–2	2–0	.	3–0	.	2–1	.	.	.	2–1	.		TAM	6–2	2–0
Tm	W–L	ALA	ARK	AUB	FLA	UGA	KEN	LSU	MSU	MIZ	OKL	OMS	SCA	TEN	TEX	TAM	Team	SR	SW

Updated for entire regular season. One game TAM @ UGA cancelled.
Tie breakers: ARK>FLA hd to hd, SCA>MSU KEN common, LSU>ALA hd to hd, MIZ>AUB TAM common.

== National rankings ==
The SEC has had all 15 softball teams ranked in the top 25, at some point, in two of these polls, and 14 in the top 25, at some point, in the third. From the previous polls, to the final polls. Texas rose as much as 5 places. Tennessee went up 3 in one poll. Ole Miss rose as much as 17. Arkansas dropped as much as 10. Texas A&M dropped as much as 14. Alabama dropped as much as 5. LSU dropped as much as 11. Mississippi State dropped as much as 7. Georgia went up at most 10. There were no other teams with changes of more than 2 places, up or down. All games were in the 2025 NCAA Division I softball tournament. Rankings of opponents is at the time of the game in the D1Softball poll.

- Texas went 1–0 over #2 Oklahoma, #3 Florida, #7 Tennessee, & 2–1 versus #11 Clemson & #12 Texas Tech, and 4–0 against not ranked.
- Tennessee was 0–1 versus #2 Oklahoma, 1–0 over #3 Florida, 1–0 against #9 UCLA & #6 Texas, and 5–1 against not ranked.
- Ole Miss went 0–1 against #12 Texas Tech & #16 Oregon, was 2–1 over #13 Arizona & #4 Arkansas, and 1–0 over not ranked.
- Arkansas was 4–2 against not ranked.
- Texas A&M went 4–2 against not ranked.
- Alabama went 0–2 versus #2 Oklahoma and 3–0 over not ranked.
- LSU was 1–2 against not ranked.
- Mississippi State was 0–2 against #12 Texas Tech and 2–0 over not ranked.
- Georgia was 1–2 against #14 Duke and 1–0 over not ranked.

=== NFCA/GOROUT ===
The 14th poll is after the conference tournaments and before the NCAA tournament. The 15th poll, after the NCAA tournament, is the final poll.

Week	0	1	2	3	4	5	6	7	8	9	10	11	12	13	14	15	
TEX	1	1	1	1	1	2	2	1	1	1	3	2	4	3	3	1	TEX
OKL	2	3	2	2	2	1	1	2	2	2	2	3	1	2	2	3	OKL
TEN	6	6	5	7	7	7	7	9	7	7	4	4	5	5	7	4	TEN
FLA	3	2	3	3	3	3	4	4	3	6	8	8	9	7^{T}	8	7	FLA
OMS	–	–	–	–	25	22	20	19	19	19	17	16	17	18	17	8	OMS
ARK	14	13	10	11	10	12	14	12	12	12	11	9	8	7^{T}	4	9	ARK
SCAR	–	–	21	19	11	9	11	10	10	10	13	13	14	14	14	12	SCAR
TAM	8	5	7	6	5	5	5	5	4	3	1	1	2	1	1	14	TAM
ALA	11	14	23	22	22	25	–	–	24	23	22	20	19	20	20	15	ALA
LSU	10	7	6	5	4	4	3	3	5	5	9	10	10	10	11	19	LSU
MSU	24	19	17	21	21	19	18	18	17	16	16	17	18	17	18	21	MSU
UGA	12	10	9	10	13	13	13	15	16	18	23	24	–	–	–	22	UGA
AUB	–	–	20	20	18	20	23	25	–	–	–	–	–	–	–	–	AUB
KEN	–	23	24	24	23	23	–	–	–	–	–	–	–	–	–	–	KEN
MIZ	15	16	22	–	–	–	–	–	–	–	–	–	–	–	–	–	MIZ

=== D1Softball ===
The 13th poll is after the end of the regular season, before the conference tournaments, then the 14th poll, after the NCAA tournament, is the final poll.

Week	0	1	2	3	4	5	6	7	8	9	10	11	12	13	14	
TEX	2	2	1	2	2	2	2	1	1	1	2	1	6	6	1	TEX
OKL	3	4	2	1	1	1	1	2	3	2	5	5	1	3	3	OKL
TEN	6	5	6	9	7	5	7	11	10	10	4	3	2	5	4	TEN
FLA	1	1	3	3	3	3	3	3	2	9	8	8	11	7	7	FLA
OMS	–	–	–	–	–	20	18	24	19	19	20	20	22	25	8	OMS
ARK	10	13	9	13	10	19	22	14	13	8	7	7	3	2	11	ARK
SCA	–	–	24	21	9	14	10	10	6	6	9	10	14	14	13	SCA
TAM	9	7	8	4	5	6	5	6	5	3	1	2	4	1	14	TAM
UGA	15	12	12	14	16	16	19	19	25	–	–	–	–	–	16	UGA
ALA	17	20	–	25	21	24	–	–	24	24	19	18	18	20	17	ALA
LSU	11	8	5	5	6	4	4	4	7	5	10	12	10	11	22	LSU
MSU	–	17	17	19	24	17	16	17	15	17	16	19	19	18	25	MSU
AUB	–	–	18	23	17	23	–	–	–	–	–	–	–	–	–	AUB
MIZ	–	15	21	–	–	–	–	–	–	–	–	–	–	–	–	MIZ
KEN	–	–	–	–	–	–	–	–	–	–	–	–	–	–	–	KEN

=== ESPN/USA Softball Collegiate ===
The 14th poll is after the conference tournaments and before the NCAA tournament. The 15th poll, after the NCAA tournament, is the final poll.

Week	0	1	2	3	4	5	6	7	8	9	10	11	12	13	14	15	
TEX	1	1	1	2	2	2	2	1	1	1	3	3	5	5	4	1	TEX
OKL	3	3	2	1	1	1	1	2	3	2	4	4	1	2	2	3	OKL
TEN	5	6	7	7	8	7	7	10	6	5	2	1	2	3	6	4	TEN
FLA	2	2	3	3	3	3	4	4	2	8	7	6	7	4	5	7	FLA
OMS	–	–	–	–	25	21	20	21	20	19	20	20	19	21	21	8	OMS
SCA	–	–	24	21	10^{T}	9	10^{T}	11	9	11	12	11	12	12	12	10	SCA
ARK	13	13	10	12	10^{T}	15	16	14	13	10	10	9	6	6	3	13	ARK
ALA	11	12	21	22	21	23	24	25	23	22	17	15	14	16	16	14	ALA
TAM	7	5	6	5	6	6	6	5	4	3	1	2	4	1	1	15	TAM
UGA	14	11	9	11	14	13	15	17	16	20	23	24	24	–	–	17	UGA
LSU	9	7	5	6	4	4	3	3	7	6	9	10	10	9	8	19	LSU
MSU	25	19	16	20	22	19	19	18	15	15	15	17	18	18	18	23	MSU
AUB	–	–	18	19	17	22	–	–	–	–	–	–	–	–	–	–	AUB
MIZ	15	16	22	–	–	–	–	–	–	–	–	–	–	–	–	–	MIZ
KEN	–	24	–	–	–	–	–	–	–	–	–	–	–	–	–	–	KEN

== All-SEC teams ==
On May 9, SEC officials announced their softball awards for the 2025 season. Bri Ellis of Arkansas was selected as Player of the Year, Karlyn Pickens of Tennessee was named Pitcher of the Year, and Tori Edwards of LSU was Freshman of the Year, and Patty Gasso of Oklahoma was chosen as the Coach of the Year, and Sam Landry of Oklahoma is Newcomer of the Year.

The All-SEC Teams consist of 21 student-athletes on the First Team, 22 student-athletes on the Second Team, and a ten-member All-Defensive Team:

=== All-SEC First Team ===
- Audrey Vandagriff, Alabama
- Bri Ellis, Arkansas
- AnnaLea Adams, Auburn
- Kendra Falby, Florida
- Taylor Shumaker, Florida
- Reagan Walsh, Florida
- Tori Edwards, LSU
- Jaden Pone, Ole Miss
- Sierra Sacco, Mississippi State
- Julia Crenshaw, Missouri
- Sam Landry, Oklahoma
- Nelly McEnroe-Marinas,Oklahoma
- Kasidi Pickering, Oklahoma
- Taylor Pannell, Tennessee
- Karlyn Pickens, Tennessee
- Reese Atwood, Texas
- Teagan Kavan, Texas
- Mia Scott, Texas
- Joley Mitchell, Texas
- Emiley Kennedy, Texas A&M
- Mya Perez, Texas A&M

=== All-SEC Second Team ===
- Kali Heivilin, Alabama
- Robyn Herron, Arkansas
- Reagan Johnson, Arkansas
- Ella McDowell, Arkansas
- Mia Williams, Florida
- Dallis Goodnight, Georgia
- Hallie Mitchell, Kentucky
- Maci Bergeron, LSU
- Sydney Berzon, LSU
- Danieca Coffey, LSU
- Lexie Brady, Ole Miss
- Persy Llamas, Ole Miss
- Nadia Barbary, Mississippi State
- Raelin Chaffin, Mississippi State
- Gabbie Garcia, Oklahoma
- Sam Gress, South Carolina
- Kayden Henry, Texas
- Ashton Maloney, Texas
- Katie Stewart, Texas
- Mac Barbara, Texas A&M
- Amari Harper, Texas A&M
- Koko Wooley, Texas A&M

=== SEC All-Defensive Team ===
- Pitcher: Sam Landry, Oklahoma
- Pitcher: Sam Gress, South Carolina
- Catcher: Reese Atwood, Texas
- First Base: Bri Ellis, Arkansas
- Second Base: Ailana Agbayani, Oklahoma
- Shortstop: Gabbie Garcia, Oklahoma
- Third Base: Nadia Barbary, Mississippi State
- Left Field: Jaden Pone, Ole Miss
- Center Field: Kendra Falby, Florida
- Right Field: Ashton Maloney, Texas
