= Megan Rhodes Smith =

American softball coach

Current position
- Title: Associate Head Coach
- Team: Tennessee
- Conference: SEC

Biographical details
- Born: October 8, 1985 (age 41); Nashville, Tennessee, U.S.
- Education: Tennessee

Playing career
- 2005–2008: Tennessee
- Position: Pitcher

Coaching career (HC unless noted)
- 2009: Charleston Southern (Asst.)
- 2010–2012: Middle Tennessee (Asst.)
- 2013: Western Kentucky (Asst.)
- 2014–2017: Lipscomb (Asst.)
- 2018–2019: Lipscomb (AHC)
- 2020: Belmont
- 2021–Present: Tennessee (Pitching)

Head coaching record
- Overall: 5-14 (.263)

Megan Rhodes Smith (born October 8, 1985) is the current Associate Head coach of Belmont softball team.

== Coaching career ==
=== Western Kentucky ===
On August 17, 2012, Rhodes Smith was hired as an assistant coach for the Western Kentucky softball program.

=== Lipscomb ===
Prior to the 2014 season, Rhodes Smith was hired as an assistant coach working primarily with the pitchers, before being promoted to associate head coach in 2018.

=== Belmont ===
On July 12, 2019, Rhodes Smith was announced as the new head coach of the Belmont softball program. Rhodes Smith went 5–14 in her lone season at the helm of the Bruins, one which was shortened due to the COVID-19 pandemic.

=== Tennessee ===
In July 2020, after just one season as head coach at Belmont, Rhodes Smith returned to her alma mater to become the pitching coach.

== Head coaching record ==
=== College ===
Record table
Season	Team	Overall	Conference	Standing	Postseason
Belmont Bruins (Ohio Valley Conference) (2020)
2020	Belmont	5–14	0–0		Season canceled due to COVID-19
Belmont:		5-14 (.263)	– (–)		
Total:		5-14 (.263)			
National champion Postseason invitational champion Conference regular season champion Conference regular season and conference tournament champion Division regular season champion Division regular season and conference tournament champion Conference tournament champion
