= 2015 Auburn Tigers softball team =

American college softball season

2015 Auburn Tigers softball

SEC Tournament Championship, W, 6-5 (9) vs. Tennessee
- Conference: Southeastern Conference
- West
- Record: 56–11 (18–6 SEC)
- Head coach: Clint Myers
- Assistant coach: Scott Woodard, Casey Myers, & Corey Myers
- Pitching coach: Corey Myers
- Home stadium: Jane B. Moore Field

2015 Southeastern Conference softball standings
	Conf.				Overall
Team	W		L	PCT	W		L	PCT
No. 2 Florida ‍†‍‍^{y}	18	–	5	.783	50	–	6	.893
No. 4 Auburn ‍‍‡‍^{y}	18	–	6	.750	49	–	9	.845
No. 5 Alabama ‍‍‍^{y}	17	–	7	.708	42	–	12	.778
No. 8 LSU ‍‍‍^{y}	15	–	9	.625	44	–	11	.800
No. 10 Tennessee ‍‍‍^{y}	15	–	9	.625	42	–	14	.750
No. 14 Georgia ‍‍‍^{y}	14	–	9	.609	40	–	14	.741
No. 12 Missouri ‍‍‍^{y}	14	–	10	.583	39	–	14	.736
No. 24 Texas A&M ‍‍‍^{y}	12	–	12	.500	38	–	18	.679
South Carolina ‍‍‍^{y}	10	–	14	.417	37	–	20	.649
Mississippi State ‍‍‍^{y}	10	–	14	.417	35	–	18	.660
Ole Miss ‍‍‍	6	–	18	.250	30	–	25	.545
Kentucky ‍‍‍^{y}	5	–	19	.208	29	–	24	.547
Arkansas ‍‍‍	1	–	23	.042	16	–	37	.302
† – Conference champion ‡ – Tournament champion y – Invited to the NCAA tournament As of May 12, 2015; Rankings from USA Today/NFCA Coaches

The 2015 Auburn Tigers softball team was an American softball team that represented the Auburn University for the 2015 NCAA softball season. In 2014, the Auburn Tigers softball team went 42-19-1 during Clint Myers first season. The Auburn Tigers played their home games at Jane B. Moore Field.

Auburn made it to its first 2015 SEC softball tournament Championship Final on May 9, 2015, held at Tiger Park in Baton Rouge, LA, and defeated #11 Tennessee in extra innings to collect its first SEC Championship in Softball.

Auburn garnered a #4 seed in the 2015 NCAA Division I softball tournament, and hosted a regional and super regional at Jane B. Moore Field in Auburn, AL. Auburn won both the regional and super regional and advanced to their first 2015 Women's College World Series at the ASA Hall of Fame Stadium in Oklahoma City, OK.

== Roster ==
2015 Auburn Tigers Softball roster
Pitchers: 19 Rachael Walters – junior; 22 Marcy Harper – junior; 23 Lexi Davis – junior; 44 Jenna Abbott – sophomore; Outfielders: 1 Tiffany Howard – junior; 3 Morgan Estell - RS Senior; 17 Branndi Melero – senior; 18 Jordan Rocker – junior; 27 Victoria Draper - RS Freshman; 77 Sydne Waldrop – sophomore	Catchers: 00 Carlee Wallace – freshman; 9 Madison Dickey - RS Junior; 10 Anna Gibbs - RS Sophomore; 12 Maria Mitchell – junior; 25 McKenzie Kilpatrick – senior; 93 Courtney Shea – freshman; Infielders: 2 Haley Fagan - RS Sophomore; 4 Madi Gipson – sophomore; 5 Emily Carosone – junior; 7 Emily Spain – freshman; 8 Jade Rhodes – junior; 13 Kasey Cooper – sophomore; 14 Kelsey Bogaards – junior; 21 Whitney Jordan – freshman; 33 Kimberlee Myers – sophomore; 44 Jenna Abbott – sophomore

2015 Auburn Tigers Softball Roster

== Schedule ==
Date	Time	Opponent	Rank	Venue	Result	TV	Record
February 5	6:00 PM	Troy	20	Jane B. Moore Field • Auburn, AL	15-5 (5)	SECN+	1-0 (0-0)
February 6	7:00 PM	UAB	20	Jane B. Moore Field • Auburn, AL	11-2	SECN+	2-0 (0-0)
February 7	3:30 PM	Evansville	20	Jane B. Moore Field • Auburn, AL	12-0 (5)	SECN+	3-0 (0-0)
February 7	5:30 PM	George Washington	20	Jane B. Moore Field • Auburn, AL	8-0 (5)	SECN+	4-0 (0-0)
February 8	1:00 PM	Appalachian State	20	Jane B. Moore Field • Auburn, AL	9-0 (5)	SECN+	5-0 (0-0)
February 8	3:00 PM	Chattanooga	20	Jane B. Moore Field • Auburn, AL	12-1 (5)	SECN+	6-0 (0-0)
February 12	4:00 PM	Mercer	17	Jane B. Moore Field • Auburn, AL	7-3	SECN+	7-0 (0-0)
February 12	6:30 PM	Georgia State	17	Jane B. Moore Field • Auburn, AL	20-8 (5)	SECN+	8-0 (0-0)
February 13	7:00 PM	Ball State	17	Jane B. Moore Field • Auburn, AL	12-1 (5)		9-0 (0-0)
February 14	2:30 PM	Mercer	17	Jane B. Moore Field • Auburn, AL	9-1 (5)	SECN+	10-0 (0-0)
February 14	4:45 PM	Eastern Illinois	17	Jane B. Moore Field • Auburn, AL	9-1 (5)	SECN+	11-0 (0-0)
February 15	1:30 PM	Winthrop	17	Jane B. Moore Field • Auburn, AL	15-4 (5)	SECN+	12-0 (0-0)
February 18	5:30 PM	Georgia State	16	Jane B. Moore Field • Auburn, AL	10-0 (5)	SECN+	13-0 (0-0)
February 20	9:00 AM	Dartmouth	16	USF Tournament • Tampa, FL	2-4		13-1 (0-0)
February 20	1:45 PM	South Florida	16	USF Tournament • Tampa, FL	6-2		14-1 (0-0)
February 21	9:00 AM	Marshall	16	USF Tournament • Tampa, FL	5-4		15-1 (0-0)
February 21	TBA	Dartmouth	16	USF Tournament • Tampa, FL	6-3		16-1 (0-0)
February 22	TBA	South Florida	16	USF Tournament • Tampa, FL	8-0 (5)		17-1 (0-0)
February 26	6:00 PM	Texas State	16	Jane B. Moore Field • Auburn, AL	6-2	SECN+	18-1 (0-0)
February 27	5:00 PM	Ohio State	16	Jane B. Moore Field • Auburn, AL	14-2 (5)		19-1 (0-0)
February 28	5:00 PM	SIUE	16	Jane B. Moore Field • Auburn, AL	8-5	SECN+	20-1 (0-0)
March 1	1:30 PM	Samford	16	Jane B. Moore Field • Auburn, AL	13-0 (5)		21-1 (0-0)
March 5	3:00 PM	Long Beach State	14	Judi Garmen Classic • Fullerton, CA	8-7 (8)		22-1 (0-0)
March 5	5:30 PM	Pacific	14	Judi Garmen Classic • Fullerton, CA	4-1		23-1 (0-0)
March 6	7:30 PM	#13 Arizona	14	Judi Garmen Classic • Fullerton, CA	20-2 (5)		24-1 (0-0)
March 6	10:00 PM	Cal State Fullerton	14	Judi Garmen Classic • Fullerton, CA	2-3		24-2 (0-0)
March 7	10:00 PM	#22 Arizona State	14	Judi Garmen Classic • Fullerton, CA	7-4		25-2 (0-0)
March 11	6:00 PM	Troy	12	Troy, AL	2-0		26-2 (0-0)
March 14	6:00 PM	Ole Miss	12	Ole Miss Softball Complex • Oxford, MS	14-3 (5)		27-2 (1-0)
March 15	4:30 PM	Ole Miss	12	Ole Miss Softball Complex • Oxford, MS	7-3	ESPNU	28-2 (2-0)
March 16	6:00 PM	Ole Miss	12	Ole Miss Softball Complex • Oxford, MS	10-2 (6)	SECN	29-2 (3-0)
March 21	3:00 PM	#12 Kentucky	9	Jane B. Moore Field • Auburn, AL	5-0	SECN+	30-2 (4-0)
March 21	6:00 PM	#12 Kentucky	9	Jane B. Moore Field • Auburn, AL	4-1	SECN+	31-2 (5-0)
March 23	1:00 PM	#12 Kentucky	9	Jane B. Moore Field • Auburn, AL	9-7	SECN+	32-2 (6-0)
March 25	4:00 PM	#11 Florida State	8	Seminole Softball Complex • Tallahassee, FL	7-10	ESPN3	32-3 (6-0)
March 25	6:00 PM	#11 Florida State	8	Seminole Softball Complex • Tallahassee, FL	10-4	ESPN3	33-3 (6-0)
March 27	6:30 PM	#20 Missouri	8	University Field • Columbia, MO	14-6 (5)		34-3 (7-0)
March 28	7:00 PM	#20 Missouri	8	University Field • Columbia, MO	4-5	SECN	34-4 (7-1)
March 29	12:00 PM	#20 Missouri	8	University Field • Columbia, MO	10-8	SECN	35-4 (8-1)
April 2	6:00 PM	#11 Tennessee	7	Jane B. Moore Field • Auburn, AL	6-2	SECN+	36-4 (9-1)
April 3	6:00 PM	#11 Tennessee	7	Jane B. Moore Field • Auburn, AL	6-8	SECN	36-5 (9-2)
April 4	3:30 PM	#11 Tennessee	7	Jane B. Moore Field • Auburn, AL	12-9	SECN+	37-5 (10-2)
April 8	5:30 PM	UAB	7	Jane B. Moore Field • Auburn, AL	10-6	SECN+	38-5 (10-2)
April 10	6:30 PM	#23 Texas A&M	7	Aggie Softball Complex • College Station, TX	8-1		39-5 (11-2)
April 11	1:00 PM	#23 Texas A&M	7	Aggie Softball Complex • College Station, TX	4-12 (5)	ESPNU	39-6 (11-3)
April 11	3:30 PM	#23 Texas A&M	7	Aggie Softball Complex • College Station, TX	12-4		40-6 (12-3)
April 17	7:30 PM	#6 Alabama	7	Jane B. Moore Field • Auburn, AL	0-6	ESPNU	40-7 (12-4)
April 18	12:30 PM	#6 Alabama	7	Jane B. Moore Field • Auburn, AL	3-13		40-8 (12-5)
April 18	5:00 PM	#6 Alabama	7	Jane B. Moore Field • Auburn, AL	13-12 (8)	ESPNU	41-8 (13-5)
April 24	6:00 PM	Arkansas	8	Jane B. Moore Field • Auburn, AL	9-1 (6)	SECN+	42-8 (14-5)
April 25	6:00 PM	Arkansas	8	Jane B. Moore Field • Auburn, AL	9-1 (5)	SECN+	43-8 (15-5)
April 26	1:00 PM	Arkansas	8	Jane B. Moore Field • Auburn, AL	10-2 (5)	SECN+	44-8 (16-5)
May 1	6:00 PM	#6 LSU	8	Tiger Park • Baton Rouge, LA	2-1	SECN+	45-8 (17-5)
May 2	6:00 PM	#6 LSU	8	Tiger Park • Baton Rouge, LA	1-0	SECN+	46-8 (18-5)
May 3	2:00 PM	#6 LSU	8	Tiger Park • Baton Rouge, LA	1-7	ESPN	46-9 (18-6)
May 7	10:00 AM	#13 Missouri	7	2015 SEC softball tournament • Tiger Park • Baton Rouge, LA	5-2	SECN	47-9 (18-6)
May 8	2:00 PM	#4 Alabama	7	2015 SEC softball tournament • Tiger Park • Baton Rouge, LA	7-1	SECN	48-9 (18-6)
May 9	7:00 PM	#11 Tennessee	7	2015 SEC softball tournament • Tiger Park • Baton Rouge, LA	6-5 (9)	SECN	49-9 (18-6)
May 15	5:30 PM	Tennessee Tech	4	2015 NCAA Division I softball tournament • Regional • Jane B. Moore Field • Auburn, AL	4-1	ESPN3	50-9 (18-6)
May 16	1:00 PM	#22 South Alabama	4	2015 NCAA Division I softball tournament • Regional • Jane B. Moore Field • Auburn, AL	1-0	ESPN3	51-9 (18-6)
May 17	12:00 PM	#22 South Alabama	4	2015 NCAA Division I softball tournament • Regional • Jane B. Moore Field • Auburn, AL	7-4	ESPN3	52-9 (18-6)
May 22	1:00 PM	#13 LA–Lafayette	4	2015 NCAA Division I softball tournament • Super Regional • Jane B. Moore Field • Auburn, AL	12-11 (8)	ESPNU	53-9 (18-6)
May 23	11:00 AM	#13 LA–Lafayette	4	2015 NCAA Division I softball tournament • Super Regional • Jane B. Moore Field • Auburn, AL	6-3	ESPN	54-9 (18-6)
May 28	2:30 PM	#5 LSU	4	2015 Women's College World Series • ASA Hall of Fame Stadium • Oklahoma City, OK	1-6	ESPN	54-10 (18-6)
May 30	12:00 PM	#8 Tennessee	4	2015 Women's College World Series • ASA Hall of Fame Stadium • Oklahoma City, OK	4-2	ESPN	55-10 (18-6)
May 30	6:00 PM	#7 UCLA	4	2015 Women's College World Series • ASA Hall of Fame Stadium • Oklahoma City, OK	11-10 (10)	ESPN	56-10 (18-6)
May 31	12:00 PM	#1 Florida	4	2015 Women's College World Series • ASA Hall of Fame Stadium • Oklahoma City, OK	2-3 (9)	ESPN	56-11 (18-6)

== Honors and awards ==
- Branndi Melero, Kasey Cooper and Emily Carosone were selected Preaseson All-SEC Team on February 5.
- Emily Carosone named SEC Softball Player of the Week on March 9.
- Emily Carosone named USA Softball National Player of the Week on March 10.
- Morgan Estell and Branndi Melero Selected in National Pro Fastpitch Draft on April 1.
- Branndi Melero named SEC Co-Softball Player of the Week on April 6.
- Emily Carosone named one of 26 Finalists for USA Softball Collegiate Player of the Year on April 8.
- Emily Carosone and Kasey Cooper named to the 1st Team All-SEC Softball Team on May 5.
- Jade Rhodes and Tiffany Howard named to the 2nd Team All-SEC Softball Team on May 5.
- Emily Carosone, Kasey Cooper and Tiffany Howard named to the SEC Softball All-Defensive Team on May 5.
- Clint Myers named 2015 SEC Softball Coach of the Year on May 5.
- Emily Carosone named one of 10 finalists for National Player of Year on May 6.
- Auburn wins 2015 SEC softball tournament Championship on May 9.
- Emily Carosone named 2015 SEC softball tournament Championship MVP on May 9.
- Auburn named host of 2015 NCAA softball tournament Championship Regional and Super Regional on May 10.
- Auburn advances to first Women's College World Series in its history on May 23.
- Emily Carosone and Kasey Cooper named to the NFCA Division I Softball All-American First Team on May 27.
- Tiffany Howard named to the NFCA Division I Softball All-American Third Team on May 27.
- Kasey Cooper named CoSIDA Capital One Academic All-American on May 29.
- Tiffany Howard Named Academic All-American on June 3.
- Carlee Wallace and Branndi Melero named to Women's College World Series All-Tournament Team on June 4.

== Ranking movement ==
Poll	Pre	Wk 1	Wk 2	Wk 3	Wk 4	Wk 5	Wk 6	Wk 7	Wk 8	Wk 9	Wk 10	Wk 11	Wk 12	Wk 13	Wk 14	Final
NFCA	20	17	16	16	14	12	9	8	7	7	7	8	8	7	4	3
USA Softball	19	17	17	19	18	14	11	9	7	6	6	8	8	6	4	3
