= 2015 NCAA Division I softball tournament =

Softball tournament determining the NCAA champion (2015)

- Teams: 64
- Finals site: ASA Hall of Fame Stadium; Oklahoma City
- Champions: Florida (2nd title)
- Runner-up: Michigan (12th WCWS Appearance)
- Winning coach: Tim Walton (2nd title)
- MOP: Lauren Haeger (Florida)

The 2015 NCAA Division I softball tournament was held from May 14 through June 3, 2015 as the final part of the 2015 NCAA Division I softball season. The 64 NCAA Division I college softball teams were selected out of an eligible 293 teams on May 10, 2015. Thirty-two teams were awarded an automatic bid as champions of their conference, and thirty-two teams were selected at-large by the NCAA Division I softball selection committee. The tournament culminated with eight teams playing in the 2015 Women's College World Series at ASA Hall of Fame Stadium in Oklahoma City.

== Automatic bids ==
The Big 12, Big West, Mountain West, Pac-12, and West Coast Conference bids were awarded to the regular season champion. All other conferences have the automatic bid go to the conference tournament winner.

Conference	School
America East	Binghamton
American	UCF
ACC	Florida State
Atlantic 10	Fordham
Atlantic Sun	USC Upstate
Big 12	Oklahoma
Big East	St. John's
Big Sky	Weber State
Big South	Longwood
Big Ten	Michigan
Big West	Cal State Northridge
Colonial	Hofstra
Conference USA	Western Kentucky
Horizon	Oakland
Ivy	Dartmouth
Mid-American	Ball State
Metro Atlantic	Fairfield
Mid-Eastern	Florida A&M
Missouri Valley	Indiana State
Mountain West	Fresno State
Northeast	Central Connecticut State
Ohio Valley	Tennessee Tech
Pac–12	Oregon
Patriot	Lehigh
SEC	Auburn
Southern	Chattanooga
Southland	Central Arkansas
SWAC	Texas Southern
Summit	North Dakota State
Sun Belt	South Alabama
WAC	New Mexico State
WCC	BYU

== National seeds ==
Teams in italics advanced to super regionals. Teams in bold advanced to Women's College World Series.

1. **Florida** (50–6)
2. **Oregon** (46–6)
3. **Michigan** (51–6)
4. **Auburn** (49–9)
5. **LSU** (44–11)
6. **Alabama** (42–12)
7. **UCLA** (45–10)
8. **Tennessee** (42–14)

9. Florida State (45–12)
10. Missouri (39–14)
11. Oklahoma (45–7)
12. Arizona (38–17)
13. Louisiana–Lafayette (39–9)
14. Georgia (40–14)
15. James Madison (47–8)
16. Notre Dame (40–13)

== Regionals and super regionals ==
The Regionals took place May 14–17. The Eugene Region was held from May 14 through 16. All other regionals were held from May 15 through 17. The super regionals took place from May 21 through 24.

=== Gainesville Super Regional ===
Round 1	Round 2
1	**Florida**	**6**
Florida A&M	0
**1**	**Florida**	**7**
Hofstra	0
Florida Atlantic	0
**Hofstra**	**1**
Gainesville Regional
Florida A&M	2
**Florida Atlantic**	**7**
Hofstra	2
**Florida Atlantic**	**3**^{(9)}
16	Notre Dame	3
**Ball State**	**6**
Ball State	0
**Kentucky**	**5**
**Kentucky**	**5**
Northwestern	4
South Bend Regional
**16**	**Notre Dame**	**14**^{(5)}
Northwestern	5
Ball State	4
**16**	**Notre Dame**	**15**^{(5)}

Regional finals
**1**	**Florida**	**1**^{(8)}	—
Florida Atlantic	0	—
**Kentucky**	**4**	—
16	Notre Dame	3	—

Super regionals
**1**	**Florida**	**7**	**1**	—
Kentucky	0	0	—

=== Knoxville Super Regional ===
Round 1	Round 2
**9**	**Florida State**	**5**
Dartmouth	1
**9**	**Florida State**	**2**
UCF	1
South Carolina	1
**UCF**	**5**
Tallahassee Regional
Dartmouth	1
**South Carolina**	**3**
**UCF**	**5**
South Carolina	2
8	**Tennessee**	**2**
Longwood	0
**8**	**Tennessee**	**9**^{(5)}
Utah	1
**Utah**	**6**
Virginia Tech	1
Knoxville Regional
**Longwood**	**6**^{(8)}
Virginia Tech	4
**Utah**	**2**
Longwood	0

Regional finals
**9**	**Florida State**	**5**	—
UCF	0	—
**8**	**Tennessee**	**3**	—
Utah	1	—

Super regionals
9	Florida State	2	**6**	1
**8**	**Tennessee**	**3**	1	**2**

=== Baton Rouge Super Regional ===
Round 1	Round 2
**5**	**LSU**	**15**^{(5)}
Texas Southern	0
5	LSU	0
**Arizona State**	**1**
Nebraska	2
**Arizona State**	**5**
Baton Rouge Regional
Texas Southern	0
**Nebraska**	**5**
**5**	**LSU**	**3**^{(10)}
Nebraska	2
**12**	**Arizona**	**4**
St. John's	2
**12**	**Arizona**	**5**
Minnesota	1
**Minnesota**	**10**^{(6)}
New Mexico State	2
Tucson Regional
St. John's	6
**New Mexico State**	**9**
**Minnesota**	**2**
New Mexico State	0

Regional finals
Arizona State	0	3
**5**	**LSU**	**5**	**4**^{(9)}
**12**	**Arizona**	2	**7**^{(8)}
Minnesota	**5**	6

Super regionals
**5**	**LSU**	**8**^{(5)}	**10**	—
12	Arizona	0	5	—

=== Auburn Super Regional ===
Round 1	Round 2
**13**	**Louisiana–Lafayette**	**11**^{(5)}
Weber State	0
**13**	**Louisiana–Lafayette**	**3**
Baylor	1
Mississippi State	4
**Baylor**	**8**
Lafayette Regional
Weber State	0
**Mississippi State**	**2**
**Baylor**	**2**
Mississippi State	0
**4**	**Auburn**	**4**
Tennessee Tech	1
**4**	**Auburn**	**1**
South Alabama	0
**South Alabama**	**11**^{(5)}
Chattanooga	1
Auburn Regional
**Tennessee Tech**	**8**
Chattanooga	2
**South Alabama**	**9**
Tennessee Tech	3

Regional finals
**13**	**Louisiana–Lafayette**	2	**9**^{(6)}
Baylor	**6**	1
**4**	**Auburn**	**7**	—
South Alabama	4	—

Super regionals
13	Louisiana–Lafayette	11	3	—
**4**	**Auburn**	**12**^{(8)}	**6**	—

=== Ann Arbor Super Regional ===
Round 1	Round 2
**3**	**Michigan**	**9**^{(6)}
Oakland	1
**3**	**Michigan**	**9**
California	1
Pittsburgh	3
**California**	**11**^{(5)}
Ann Arbor Regional
Oakland	3
**Pittsburgh**	**6**
**Pittsburgh**	**6**
California	3
**14**	**Georgia**	**6**
Central Connecticut	1
14	Georgia	1
**WKU**	**2**^{(14)}
North Carolina	1
**WKU**	**2**
Athens Regional
Central Connecticut	0
**North Carolina**	**8**^{(5)}
North Carolina	5
**14**	**Georgia**	**6**

Regional finals
**3**	**Michigan**	**10**	—
Pittsburgh	3	—
WKU	3	0
**14**	**Georgia**	**12**^{(5)}	**17**^{(5)}

Super regionals
**3**	**Michigan**	**10**	**7**	—
14	Georgia	3	6	—

=== Tuscaloosa Super Regional ===
Round 1	Round 2
**11**	**Oklahoma**	**8**^{(5)}
Central Arkansas	0
**11**	**Oklahoma**	**7**
Texas A&M	5
Lehigh	1
**Texas A&M**	**2**
Norman Regional
Central Arkansas	0
**Lehigh**	**3**
**Texas A&M**	**5**
Lehigh	0
**6**	**Alabama**	**8**^{(6)}
Fairfield	0
**6**	**Alabama**	**9**^{(5)}
Washington	0
**Washington**	**4**
USC Upstate	1
Tuscaloosa Regional
Fairfield	0
**USC Upstate**	**9**^{(6)}
**Washington**	**9**^{(5)}
USC Upstate	1

Regional finals
**11**	**Oklahoma**	**2**	—
Texas A&M	0	—
**6**	**Alabama**	**11**	—
Washington	1	—

Super regionals
11	Oklahoma	**5**	0	3
**6**	**Alabama**	2	**2**	**5**

=== Los Angeles Super Regional ===
Round 1	Round 2
**7**	**UCLA**	**9**^{(5)}
Cal State Northridge	1
**7**	**UCLA**	**4**
Texas	1
San Diego State	3
**Texas**	**8**
Los Angeles Regional
Cal State Northridge	4
**San Diego State**	**5**
Texas	3
**San Diego State**	**4**^{(9)}
**10**	**Missouri**	**7**
Indiana State	0
**10**	**Missouri**	**5**
Kansas	3
**Kansas**	**1**
Louisville	0
Columbia Regional
**Indiana State**	**2**^{(8)}
Louisville	1
**Kansas**	**2**
Indiana State	0

Regional finals
**7**	**UCLA**	**8**^{(6)}	—
San Diego State	0	—
**10**	**Missouri**	**7**	—
Kansas	6	—

Super regionals
**7**	**UCLA**	**7**	**10**	—
10	Missouri	4	6	—

=== Eugene Super Regional ===
Round 1	Round 2
**15**	**James Madison**	**10**^{(5)}
Binghamton	1
15	James Madison	0
**NC State**	**2**
Fordham	5
**NC State**	**12**
Harrisonburg Regional
Binghamton	0
**Fordham**	**8**^{(5)}
**Fordham**	**2**
15	James Madison	1
**2**	**Oregon**	**8**^{(6)}
BYU	0
**2**	**Oregon**	**4**
North Dakota State	3
**North Dakota State**	**4**
Fresno State	0
Eugene Regional
**BYU**	**8**
Fresno State	7
BYU	0
**North Dakota State**	**7**

Regional finals
**NC State**	**2**	—
Fordham	1	—
2	**Oregon**	**6**	—
North Dakota State	1	—

Super regionals
NC State	1	3	—
**2**	**Oregon**	**6**	**9**	—

== Women's College World Series ==
The Women's College World Series was held May 28 through June 3, 2015, in Oklahoma City.

=== Participants ===
School	Conference	Record (conference)	Head coach	WCWS appearances† (including 2015 WCWS)	WCWS best finish†*	WCWS W–L record† (excluding 2015 WCWS)
Alabama	SEC	47–13 (17–7)	Patrick Murphy	10 (last: 2014)	1st (2012)	16–17
Auburn	SEC	54–9 (18–6)	Clint Myers	1	—	0–0
Florida	SEC	55–6 (18–5)	Tim Walton	7 (last: 2014)	1st (2014)	17–11
LSU	SEC	50–12 (15–9)	Beth Torina	4 (last: 2012)	3rd (2004)	6–6
Michigan	Big Ten	56–6 (21–2)	Carol Hutchins	11 (last: 2013)	1st (2005)	9–20
Oregon	Pac-12	51–6 (21–3)	Mike White	4 (last: 2014)	3rd (2014)	5–6
Tennessee	SEC	47–15 (15–9)	Ralph and Karen Weekly	7 (last: 2013)	2nd (2007, 2013)	15–12
UCLA	Pac-12	50–10 (19–5)	Kelly Inouye-Perez	26 (last: 2010)	1st (1982, 1984, 1985, 1988, 1989, 1990; 1992, 1995*, 1999, 2003, 2004, 2010)	94–29

=== Bracket ===
First round
**1**	**Florida**	**7**
8	Tennessee	2
**5**	**LSU**	**6**
4	Auburn	1
8	Tennessee	2
**4**	**Auburn**	**4**
**3**	**Michigan**	**5**
6	Alabama	0
**7**	**UCLA**	**7**
2	Oregon	1
**6**	**Alabama**	**2**
2	Oregon	1

Second round
**1**	**Florida**	**4**
5	LSU	0
7	UCLA	10
**4**	**Auburn**	**11**^{(10)}
**3**	**Michigan**	**10**
7	UCLA	4
**5**	**LSU**	**5**
6	Alabama	3

Semifinals
**1**	**Florida**	**3**^{(9)}	—
4	Auburn	2	—
**3**	**Michigan**	**6**	—
5	LSU	3	—

Finals
1	**Florida**	**3**	0	**4**
3	Michigan	2	**1**	1

=== Championship game ===
School	Top Batter	Stats.
Florida	Taylor Schwarz (1B)	1–4 2RBI 2Ks
Michigan	Sierra Romero (2B)	1–3 RBIs BB

School	Pitcher	IP	H	R	ER	BB	SO	AB	BF
Florida	Lauren Haeger (W)	7.0	5	1	1	1	5	26	30
Michigan	Haylie Wagner (L)	2.0	4	4	4	0	0	8	12
Michigan	Megan Betsa	4.0	1	0	0	3	8	13	21

== Record by conference ==
Conference	# of Bids	Record	Win %	RF	SR	WS	NS	CS	NC
Southeastern	11	50–25	.667	9	8	5	3	1	1
Big Ten	4	13–8	.619	2	1	1	1	1	–
Pac-12	7	21–15	.583	6	3	2	–	–	–
Atlantic Coast	7	12–14	.462	4	2	–	–	–	–
Big 12	4	10–8	.556	3	1	–	–	–	–
Sun Belt	2	5–5	.500	2	1	–	–	–	–
Colonial	2	2–4	.333	–	–	–	–	–	–
Conference USA	2	4–4	.500	2	–	–	–	–	–
Mountain West	2	2–4	.333	1	–	–	–	–	–
Other	23	14–46	.233	3	–	–	–	–	–

The columns RF, SR, WS, NS, CS, and NC respectively stand for the regional finals, super regionals, College World Series teams, national semifinals, championship series, and national champion.

== Media coverage ==
=== Radio ===
Westwood One provided nationwide radio coverage of the championship series. It was streamed online at westwoodsports.com and through TuneIn. Kevin Kugler and Leah Amico provided the call for Westwood One.

=== Television ===
ESPN held exclusive rights to the tournament, with games airing across ESPN, ESPN2, and ESPNU. Regional and super-regional games were broadcast additionally using SEC Network, ESPN3, and SEC Network Plus. Longhorn Network simulcast coverage of games involving the Texas Longhorns.

Coverage of the tournament was highly viewed; the LSU/Michigan and UCLA/Auburn games drew the largest viewership of the bracket round games, coverage of game 3 of the championship series was seen by 2.27 million viewers, and all three games in the championship series had an average viewership of 1.85 million. Viewership of the Women's College World Series was 31% higher than that of the 2015 NCAA Division I baseball tournament held later in the month.

==== Broadcast assignments ====
Regionals

- Ann Arbor: Adam Amin & Amanda Scarborough
- Athens: Kaleb Frady & Maya Branch
- Auburn: Jennie Ritter & Melissa Lee
- Baton Rouge: Beth Mowins, Jessica Mendoza, & Michele Smith
- Columbia: Ben Arnet & Ashley Moore
- Gainesville: Jonathan Yardley & Jenny Dalton-Hill
- Knoxville: Sam Gore & Amanda Freed
- Lafayette: Pam Ward & Cheri Kempf
- Los Angeles: Holly Rowe & Danielle Lawrie
- Norman: Thad Anderson & Carol Bruggeman
- Tallahassee: Jonathan Schillace, Karleigh Rafter or Robin Ahrberg
- Tuscaloosa: Cara Capuano & Leah Amico

Super regionals

- Ann Arbor: Adam Amin & Amanda Scarborough
- Knoxville: Sam Gore & Amanda Freed
- Auburn: Cara Capuano & Leah Amico
- Eugene: Melissa Lee & Jennie Ritter
- Tuscaloosa: Beth Mowins, Jessica Mendoza, & Michele Smith
- Baton Rouge: Pam Ward & Cheri Kempf
- Gainesville: Mark Neely & Jenny Dalton-Hill
- Los Angeles: Holly Rowe & Danielle Lawrie

Women's College World Series

- Adam Amin, Amanda Scarborough, & Laura Rutledge (afternoons)
- Beth Mowins, Jessica Mendoza, Michele Smith, & Holly Rowe (evenings & championship series)
- Curt Schilling (championship series)
