= Tennessee Lady Volunteers softball =

Women's university softball team from Knoxville, Tennessee

- 2026 Tennessee Lady Volunteers softball team
- Founded: 1996 (29 years ago)
- University: University of Tennessee
- Athletic director: Danny White
- Head coach: Karen Weekly (25th season)
- Conference: SEC
- Location: Knoxville, Tennessee, US
- Home stadium: Sherri Parker Lee Stadium (capacity: 2,200; Record: 2,549)
- Nickname: Lady Volunteers
- Colors: Orange, white, and smokey gray

NCAA WCWS runner-up
- 2007, 2013

NCAA WCWS appearances
- 2005, 2006, 2007, 2010, 2012, 2013, 2015, 2023, 2025, 2026

NCAA super regional appearances
- 2005, 2006, 2007, 2010, 2012, 2013, 2014, 2015, 2017, 2018, 2019, 2023, 2024, 2025, 2026

NCAA Tournament appearances
- 1999, 2004, 2005, 2006, 2007, 2008, 2009, 2010, 2011, 2012, 2013, 2014, 2015, 2016, 2017, 2018, 2019, 2021, 2022, 2023, 2024, 2025, 2026

Conference tournament championships
- 2006, 2011, 2023

Regular-season conference championships
- 2007, 2023, 2024

The Tennessee Lady Volunteers softball is the team that represents the University of Tennessee (UT) in Knoxville, Tennessee in NCAA Division I women's softball competition. They are currently coached by Karen Weekly, as the team has become a consistently top-tier team within the Southeastern Conference (SEC), appearing in every NCAA tournament that has been held since 2004, and qualifying for ten Women's College World Series.

Along with all other UT women's sports teams, it used the nickname "Lady Volunteers" (or the short form "Lady Vols") until the 2015–16 school year, when the school dropped the "Lady" prefix from the nicknames of all women's teams except in basketball. In September 2017, the "Lady Volunteers" name was reinstated for all women's athletics teams.

== Overview ==
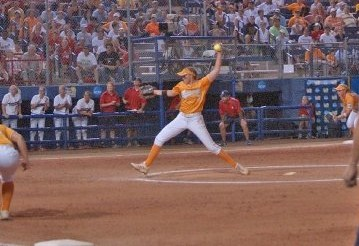
Volunteers softball legend Monica Abbott

The Lady Vols first fielded a softball team in 1996 with Jim Beitia as head coach. In 2002, Tennessee hired the husband and wife team and former Chattanooga coaches Ralph and Karen Weekly as co-head coaches. Since 2004, the team has reached the NCAA Tournament every year and the Women's College World Series ten times. Under the Weekly's, Tennessee has been one of only two programs (the other is Alabama) to be an NCAA Top-16 seed every year since the current format was adopted in 2005. One particularly notable season came in 2007 when the Lady Vols managed to make history, finishing 63–8 for the program's best winning percentage of .887. The 2007 season culminated in a third-straight trip to the WCWS where Tennessee became the first SEC program to reach the best-of-three NCAA Championship Series, before falling to champion Arizona. That year, the team managed two wins over No. 4 Arizona, in addition to other triumphs against No. 6 Northwestern and No. 7 Texas A&M. These results propelled the Lady Vols to a record 11 consecutive weeks at No. 1 in the ESPN.com/USA Softball poll, becoming the first SEC school to reach the top ranking in the league's softball history. Tennessee would again reach the national championship series in 2013 as the No. 7 seed, where they ultimately fell to No. 1 Oklahoma.

== Sherri Parker Lee Stadium ==
The Sherri Parker Lee Stadium is the home venue for the Lady Vols, replacing Tyson Park. Opened in 2008, the stadium can seat 1,614 spectators as well as three press boxes, four VIP suites and an observation deck for television crews. In addition to Tennessee home games, Lee Stadium has hosted the SEC softball tournament (in 2009 and 2017) and exhibition games involving the US national team (2008) and the Dutch national team (2011, 2012).

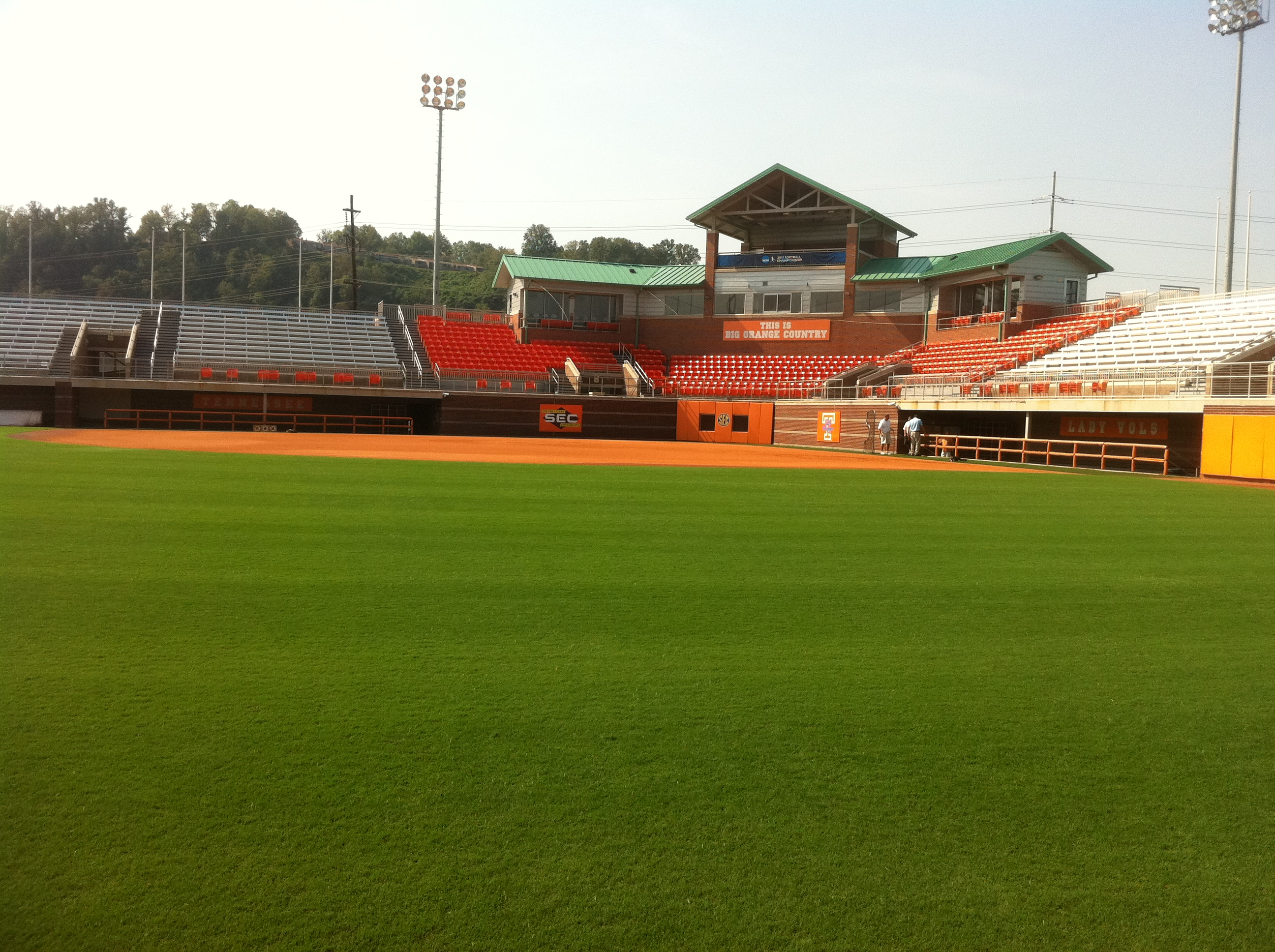
Sherri Parker Lee Stadium

Situated next to the stadium, the Volunteers clubhouse is approximately 7,000 square feet (650 m^{2}) and features a team room, whirlpools, training area and conference room. Its other amenities include a kitchen, 30-seat theater, trophy room and a recreation room with a big-screen television, pool table, video games and comfortable furniture for the student-athletes. The locker room is also equipped with full laundry facilities, a mud room, 24 large lockers, shower and bathroom facilities. Also next to the clubhouse is one of the largest batting cage facilities in the nation. It contains four 16-by-60-foot (18 m) cages which are designed to provide plenty of room to walk or film between each. All four cages are covered from the weather and possess high-quality Astroturf.

In 2011 the field was recognized as the NFCA/Stabilizer Solutions Field of the Year.

In 2017 general admission outfield bleachers were added to the stadium.

== Head coach ==
Karen Weekly took over as sole head coach in 2021, having previously served as co-head coach alongside her husband Ralph Weekly since 2002.

Since Ralph and Karen Weekly started coaching the Lady Vols, the program's record and standing in the SEC have improved to a team is recognised for their success. The National Fastpitch Coaches Association (NFCA) has chosen to honor Ralph for his efforts throughout a distinguished, three-decade career, that has spanned from his time in the U.S. Air Force through stops at Pacific Lutheran, Chattanooga and now Tennessee, with a 2011 induction into the NFCA Hall of Fame.

Voted in by his coaching peers and with the organization consisting of just 49 previous inclusions, Ralph Weekly will join Ithaca head coach Deb Pallozzi in ceremonies to be held at the annual NFCA Convention. Ralph and Karen have taken the Vols to their first Southeastern Conference regular season and tournament championships as well as the team's first Women's College World Series appearance.

Their overall record at Tennessee is 465–150–2 and, in 2005, they recorded the programs most wins in a season with 67, an NCAA record at the time.. Ralph and Karen have also authored a book, High-Scoring Softball.

== Coaching staff ==
Name	Position coached	Consecutive season at Tennessee in current position
Karen Weekly	Head Coach	26th
Megan Rhodes Smith	Associate Head Coach	1st
Ehren Earleywine	Associate Head Coach	1st
Aubrey Leach	Assistant Coach	1st

== Year-by-year results ==
Season	Record		SEC Finish	SEC tournament results	National Seed	NCAA tournament results
Season	Overall	Conference	SEC Finish	SEC tournament results	National Seed	NCAA tournament results
1996	54–14	–	–	–	–	–
1997	45–22	20–7	2nd (East)	L 0–2 vs. Auburn; L 1–2 vs. Florida	–	–
1998	37–31	13–15	3rd (East)	L 1–2 vs. Alabama; W 2–1 vs. Arkansas; L 0–8 vs. No. 12 LSU	–	–
1999	44–27	17–11	T–1st (East)	W 11–3 vs. Florida; W 4–2 vs. Mississippi State; L 2–3 vs. Arkansas; L 1–3 vs. Arkansas	–	Regional; L 1–12 vs. Cal State Fullerton; L 1–12 vs. Washington
2000	29–34	5–22	5th (East)	–	–	–
2001	24–35	9–20	5th (East)	–	–	–
2002	35–25–1	8–17	4th (East)	–	–	–
2003	45–25	14–15	4th (East)	L 0–1 vs. No. 12 LSU; W 4–3 vs. Auburn; W 5–3 vs. No. 7 Georgia; L 4–3 vs. No. 16 Alabama	–	–
2004	55–16	20–8	1st (East)	L 2–8 vs. Mississippi State; W 7–5 vs. No. 23 Florida; W 1–0 vs. No. 15 Alabama; L 0–4 vs. No. 10 Georgia	–	Regional; W 10–0 vs. Illinois-Chicago; L 0–4 vs. Oregon State; W 4–0 vs. DePaul; L 5–6 vs. Illinois-Chicago
Start of National Seeding
2005	67–15	20–8	2nd (East)	W 4–0 vs. No. 23 Florida; L 3–5 vs. No. 8 Georgia; W 3–0 vs. Mississippi State; W 3–1 vs. No. 9 Alabama; L 0–3 vs. No. 9 Alabama	No. 11	Regional; W 9–0 vs. Miami (Ohio); W 4–0 vs. College of Charleston; W 2–0 vs. College of Charleston Super Regional; W 2–0 vs. No. 6 Stanford; W 6–0 vs. No. 6 Stanford WCWS; W 1–0 vs. No. 3 Arizona; L 1–3 vs. No. 7 UCLA; W 4–0 vs. No. 12 Alabama; W 2–0 vs. No. 1 Michigan; L 2–3 vs. No. 1 Michigan
2006	61–12	21–9	2nd (East)	2006 SEC Tournament; W 6–0 vs. Florida; W 2–1 vs. No. 4 Alabama; W 3–0 vs. No. 12 LSU; Tournament Champions	No. 8	Regional; W 6–4 vs. Tennessee Tech; W 9–1 vs. Virginia Tech; W 8–1 vs. Louisville Super Regional; W 5–3 vs. No. 9 Michigan; L 1–5 vs. No. 9 Michigan; W 1–0 vs. No. 9 Michigan WCWS; W 4–3 vs. No. 1 UCLA; L 0–2 vs. No. 4 Northwestern; W 3–1 vs. No. 6 Arizona State; W 1–0 vs. No. 2 Arizona; L 0–6 vs. No. 2 Arizona
2007	63–8	23–4	Champions	2007 SEC Tournament; W 6–0 vs. Ole Miss; L 0–1 vs. No. 19 Florida	No. 5	Regional; W 8–0 vs. Furman; W 2–0 vs. North Carolina; W 7–0 vs. Winthrop Super Regional; W 9–0 vs. Hawaii; L 6–9 vs. Hawaii; W 7–1 vs. Hawaii WCWS; W 2–0 vs. No. 4 Texas A&M; W 1–0 vs. No. 1 Arizona; W 3–0 vs. No. 2 Northwestern National Championship; W 3–0 vs. No. 1 Arizona; L 0–1 vs. No. 1 Arizona; L 0–5 vs. No. 1 Arizona
2008	50–16	14–2	2nd (East)	2008 SEC Tournament; W 5–2 vs. No. 25 Georgia; L 1–6 vs. No. 1 Florida	No. 13	Regional; W 3–0 vs. Winthrop; L 0–4 vs. Virginia Tech; W 8–1 vs. Louisville; W 7–1 vs. Virginia Tech; L 2–4 vs. Virginia Tech
2009	40–18–1	12–12–1	3rd (East)	2009 SEC Tournament; W 6–5 vs. No. 20 LSU; L 3–11 vs. No. 1 Florida	No. 13	Regional; W 4–3 vs. James Madison; W 5–2 vs. Nebraska; L 1–6 vs. Jacksonville State; L 1–2 vs. Jacksonville State
2010	49–15	17–8	3rd (East)	2010 SEC Tournament; W 6–4 vs. No. 9 Georgia; L 3–4 vs. No. 4 Alabama	No. 15	Regional; W 5–0 vs. Ball State; W 11–2 vs. Virginia; W 3–1 vs. Louisville Super Regional; W 5–0 vs. No. 2 Michigan; W 4–3 vs. No. 2 Michigan WCWS; W 9–0 vs. No. 10 Arizona; W 7–5 vs. No. 6 Georgia; L 0–8 vs. No. 10 Arizona; L 2–5 vs. No. 10 Arizona
2011	49–12	20–8	2nd (East)	2011 SEC Tournament; W 4–1 vs. No. 20 Kentucky; W 2–1 vs. No. 24 Auburn; W 6–5 vs. No. 9 Georgia; Tournament Champions	No. 14	Regional; W 8–0 vs. Liberty; L 1–6 vs. Oklahoma State; W 7–0 vs. Georgia Tech; L 5–6 vs. Oklahoma State
2012	52–14	22–6	1st (East)	2012 SEC Tournament; W 2–1 vs. Auburn; L 1–2 vs. No. 7 Florida	No. 7	Regional; L 0–1 vs. Miami (OH); W 8–0 vs. UAB; W 8–0 vs. Miami (OH); W 2–1 vs. Virginia Tech; W 10–2 vs. Virginia Tech Super Regional; W 3–2 vs. No. 10 Georgia; L 0–1 vs. No. 10 Georgia; W 2–1 vs. No. 10 Georgia WCWS; L 3–5 vs. No. 2 Alabama; L 1–3 vs. No. 11 Oregon
2013	52–12	16–6	1st (East)	2013 SEC Tournament; W 5–0 vs. South Carolina; L 0–3 vs. No. 8 Missouri	No. 7	Regional; W 9–0 vs. Longwood; W 1–0 vs. NC State; W 7–0 vs. NC State Super Regional; W 3–2 vs. No. 10 Alabama; W 5–3 vs. No. 10 Alabama WCWS; W 9–2 vs. No. 2 Florida; W 1–0 vs. No. 11 Washington; W 2–1 vs. No. 4 Texas National Championship; L 3–5 vs. No. 1 Oklahoma; L 0–4 vs. No. 1 Oklahoma
2014	46–12	17–8	2nd	2014 SEC Tournament; L 2–0 vs. No. 15 Kentucky	No. 10	Regional; W 12–3 vs. Charleston Southern; W 12–0 vs. Virginia Tech; W 2–0 vs. Lipscomb Super Regional; L 1–8 vs. No. 7 Oklahoma; W 4–0 vs. No. 7 Oklahoma; L 2–8 vs. No. 7 Oklahoma
2015	47–17	15–9	5th	2015 SEC Tournament; W 5–4 vs. No. 24 Kentucky; W 7–5 vs. No. 8 LSU; W 2–1 vs. No. 1 Florida; L 5–6 vs. No. 5 Auburn	No. 8	Regional; W 2–0 vs. Longwood; W 9–1 vs. Utah; W 3–1 vs. Utah Super Regional; W 3–2 vs. No. 9 Florida St. L 1–6 vs. No. 9 Florida St. W 2–1 vs. No. 9 Florida St. WCWS; L 2–7 vs. No. 1 Florida; L 2–4 vs. No. 4 Auburn
2016	43–16	16–7	3rd	2016 SEC Tournament; W 5–1 vs. South Carolina; L 1–3 vs. No. 13 LSU	No. 13	Regional; W 10–2 vs. Marist; L 0–4 vs. Arizona; W 10–1 vs. Ohio State; L 3–4 vs. Arizona
2017	48–12	16–7	3rd	2017 SEC Tournament; L 2–6 vs. No. 21 LSU	No. 8	Regional; W 5–0 vs. Longwood; W 7–3 vs. USC Upstate; W 3–0 vs. Longwood Super Regional; W 8–1 vs. No. 9 Texas A&M; L 5–6 vs. No. 9 Texas A&M; L 3–5 vs. No. 9 Texas A&M
2018	48–14	14–10	4th	2018 SEC Tournament; W 1–0 vs. No. 11 LSU; L 2–10 vs. No. 4 Florida	No. 10	Regional; W 9–0 vs. Monmouth; W 12–3 vs. James Madison; W 5–1 vs. Ohio Super Regional; L 3–4 vs. No. 7 Georgia; L 1–2 vs. No. 7 Georgia
2019	43–17	14–10	2nd	2019 SEC Tournament; L 0–2 vs. No. 24 Auburn	No. 12	Regional; W 8–0 vs. Longwood; W 12–4 vs. Ohio State; L 0–1 vs. North Carolina; W 2–0 vs. North Carolina Super Regional; L 0–3 vs. No. 5 Florida; W 3–2 vs. No. 5 Florida; L 1–2 vs. No. 5 Florida
2020	14–9	0–0	–	Cancelled (COVID-19)	–	Cancelled (COVID-19)
2021	42–15	12–11	7th	2021 SEC Tournament; W 3–2 vs. Texas A&M; W 1–0 vs. No. 6 Arkansas; L 5–6 vs. No. 3 Alabama	No. 9	Regional; W 8–1 vs. Eastern Kentucky; L 1–3 vs. James Madison; L 4–6 vs. Liberty
2022	41–18	15–8	3rd	2022 SEC Tournament; W 1–0 vs. Mississippi State; L 0–3 vs. No. 22 Missouri	No. 11	Regional; W 9–1 vs. Campbell; W 3–0 vs. Oregon State; L 3–8 vs. Oregon State; L 1–3 vs. Oregon State
2023	51–10	19–5	Champions	2023 SEC Tournament; W 4–0 No. 21 Florida; W 7–6 No. 13 Alabama; W 3–1 South Carolina; Tournament Champions	No. 4	Regional; W 12–0 vs. Northern Kentucky; W 9–1 vs. Indiana; W 7–3 vs. Indiana Super Regional; W 5–2 vs. No. 13 Texas; W 9–0 vs. No. 13 Texas WCWS; W 10–5 vs. No. 5 Alabama; L 0–9 vs. No. 1 Oklahoma; W 3–1 No. 6 Oklahoma State; L 1–5 No. 3 Florida St.
2024	44–12	19–5	Champions	2024 SEC Tournament L 1–2 No. 10 LSU	No. 3	Regional W 3–0 Dayton; W 12–0 Virginia; W 6–0 Virginia; Super Regional; W 3–2 No. 14 Alabama; L 2–3 No. 14 Alabama; L 1–4 No. 14 Alabama
2025	47–17	15–9	4th	2025 SEC Tournament; L 1–6 Arkansas	No. 7	Regional; W 17–0 ^{(5)} vs. Miami (OH); W 4–2 vs. Ohio State; W 5–0 vs. Ohio State Super Regional; L 2–5 vs. Nebraska; W 3–2 vs. Nebraska; W 1–0 vs. Nebraska WCWS; L 3–4 vs. Oklahoma; W 11–3 ^{(5)} vs. Florida; W 5–4 ^{(9)} vs. UCLA; L 0–2 vs. Texas
2026	49–12	16–8	T–4th	2026 SEC Tournament; L 1–4 Ole Miss	No. 7	Regional; W 3–1 vs. Northern Kentucky; W 7–5 vs. Virginia; W 5–1 vs. Virginia Super Regional; W 3–1 vs. Georgia; W 2–1 vs. Georgia WCWS; W 6–3 vs. Texas; W 2–1 vs. Texas Tech; L 2–5 vs. Texas; L 0–4 vs. Texas

=== NCAA Tournament seeding history ===
National seeding began in 2005. The Tennessee Volunteers are one of only two teams to have a national seed every year, along with Alabama.

Years →	'05	'06	'07	'08	'09	'10	'11	'12	'13	'14	'15	'16	'17	'18	'19	'21	'22	'23	'24	'25	'26
Seeds →	11	8	5	13	13	15	14	7	7	10	8	13	8	10	12	9	11	4	3	7	7

== Awards and honors ==
=== All-Americans ===
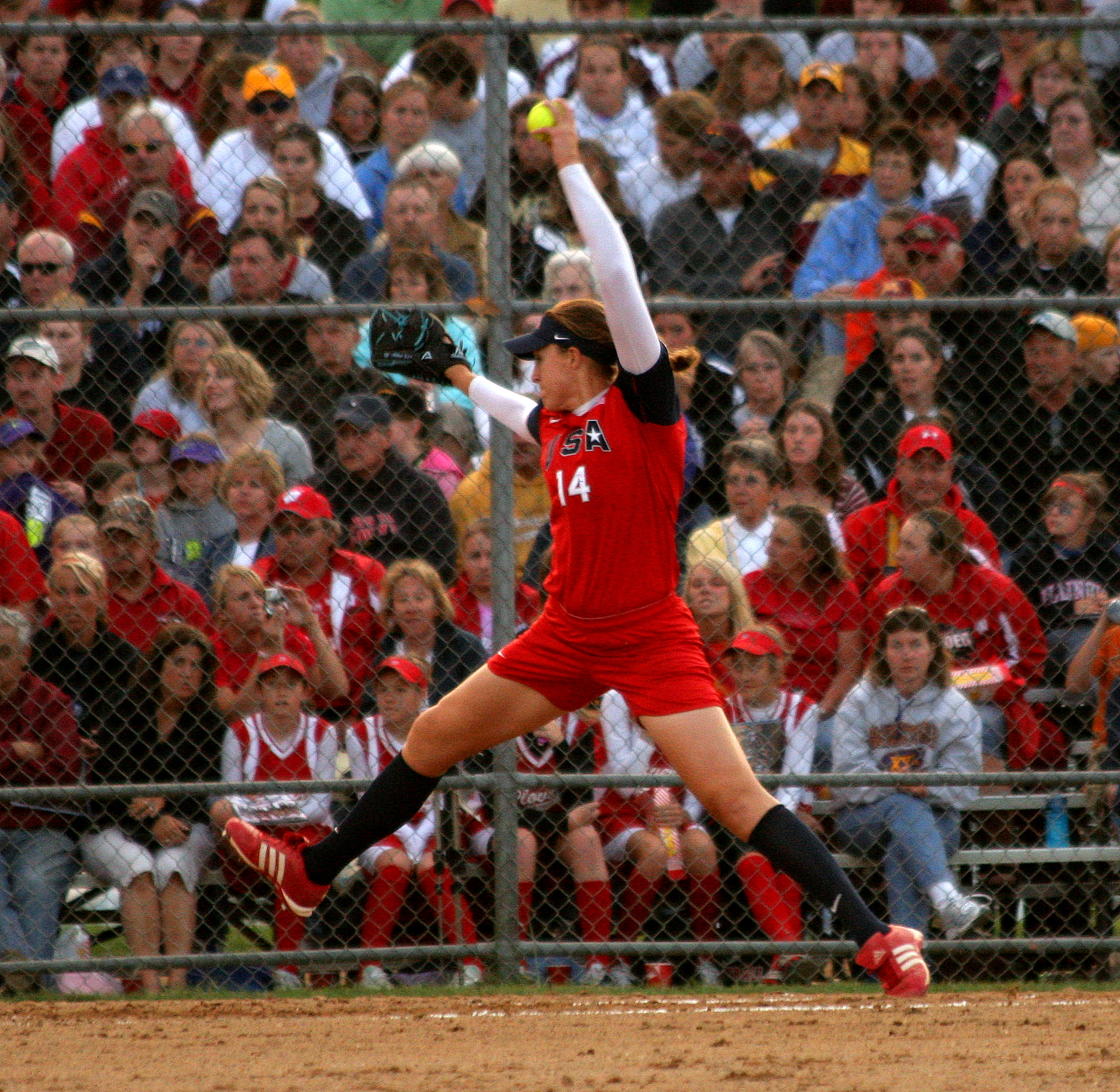
Four time All- American Monica Abbott

The Tennessee Volunteers softball program has garnered 36 Louisville Slugger/NFCA All-American honors.

- Monica Abbott – 2004, 2005, 2006, and 2007 NFCA All-American
- Tonya Callahan – 2006, 2007, and 2008 NFCA All-American
- Raven Chavanne – 2010, 2011, 2012 and 2013 NFCA All-American
- India Chiles – 2007 NFCA All-American
- Kat Dotson – 2010 NFCA All-American
- Kristi Durant – 2005 and 2006 NFCA All-American
- Sarah Fekete – 2005 and 2006 NFCA All-American
- Rainey Gaffin – 2015, 2016 NFCA All-American
- Lauren Gibson – 2011, 2012 and 2013 NFCA All-American
- McKenna Gibson – 2023 NFCA All-American
- Payton Gottshall – 2024 NFCA All-American
- Meghan Gregg – 2017 and 2018 NFCA All-American
- Tiffany Huff – 2009 NFCA All-American
- Aubrey Leach – 2018 NFCA All-American
- Sage Mardjetko – 2026 NFCA All-American
- Kiki Milloy – 2021 and 2023 NFCA All-American
- Taylor Pannell – 2025 NFCA All-American
- Karlyn Pickens – 2024, 2025, and 2026 NFCA All-American
- Ellen Renfroe – 2011 and 2012 NFCA All-American
- Ashley Rogers – 2021 and 2023 NFCA All-American
- Lindsay Schutzler – 2005, 2006, and 2007 NFCA All-American
- Madison Shipman – 2012, 2013, and 2014 NFCA All-American

=== National awards ===
USA Softball Collegiate Player of the Year

- Monica Abbott – 2007

NFCA National Pitcher of the Year

- Ashley Rogers – 2023

NFCA National Freshman of the Year

- Annie Aldrete – 2014

Softball America Pitcher of the Year

- Karlyn Pickens – 2025

NFCA Golden Shoe Award

- Raven Chavanne – 2013

Honda Sports Award

- Monica Abbott – 2007
- Madison Shipman – 2014

Senior CLASS Award

- Madison Shipman – 2014

=== Conference awards ===
SEC Player of the Year

- India Chiles – 2007
- Tonya Callahan – 2008
- Lauren Gibson – 2013
- Madison Shipman – 2014
- Meghan Gregg – 2017

SEC Pitcher of the Year

- Monica Abbott – 2004, 2005, 2007
- Karlyn Pickens – 2024, 2025

SEC Freshman of the Year

- Monica Abbott – 2004
- Kat Dotson – 2010
- Ellen Renfroe – 2011
- Caylan Arnold – 2017
- Karlyn Pickens – 2023

SEC Coach of the Year

- Ralph Weekly – 2004, 2007
- Karen Weekly – 2004, 2007, 2023, 2024

== See also ==
- List of NCAA Division I softball programs
