= Coastal Athletic Association softball tournament =

American college softball tournament

- Conference softball championship
- Sport: Softball
- Conference: Coastal Athletic Association
- Number of teams: 6
- Format: Double-elimination tournament
- Played: 2002–present
- Last contest: 2026
- Current champion: Charleston
- Most championships: Hofstra (13)

The Coastal Athletic Association softball tournament (also referred to as the CAA Tournament) is the conference championship tournament in college softball for the Coastal Athletic Association. It is a double-elimination tournament and seeding is based on regular season records. The tournament is held at the home stadium of the regular season champion. The winner receives the conference's automatic bid to the NCAA Division I softball tournament.

== Format ==
The top six teams from the regular season compete in the double-elimination tournament.

== Champions ==
=== Year-by-year ===
Year	Champion	Location	MVP
2002	Hofstra	Hofstra Softball Stadium • Hempstead, NY	Stefanie Kenney, Hofstra
2003	Hofstra	Hofstra Softball Stadium • Hempstead, NY	Amanda Hallaway, Hofstra
2004	Hofstra	Hofstra Softball Stadium • Hempstead, NY	Lisa Wambold, Hofstra
2005	Hofstra	Hofstra Softball Stadium • Hempstead, NY	Laura Sweeney, Hofstra
2006	Hofstra	Robert E. Heck Softball Complex • Panthersville, GA	Ashley Lane, Hofstra
2007	Hofstra	Hofstra Softball Stadium • Hempstead, NY	Kayleigh Lotti, Hofstra
2008	Hofstra	Hofstra Softball Stadium • Hempstead, NY	Kayleigh Lotti, Hofstra
2009	James Madison	Hofstra Softball Stadium • Hempstead, NY	Meredith Felts, James Madison
2010	Hofstra	Hofstra Softball Stadium • Hempstead, NY	Olivia Galati, Hofstra
2011	Georgia State	Hofstra Softball Stadium • Hempstead, NY	Alana Thomas, Georgia State
2012	Hofstra	Hofstra Softball Stadium • Hempstead, NY	Olivia Galati, Hofstra
2013	Hofstra	Hofstra Softball Stadium • Hempstead, NY	Olivia Galati, Hofstra
2014	James Madison	Bank of the James Field at Veterans Memorial Park • Harrisonburg, VA	Caitlin Sandy, James Madison
2015	Hofstra	Bank of the James Field at Veterans Memorial Park • Harrisonburg, VA	Taylor Pirone, Hofstra
2016	James Madison	Bank of the James Field at Veterans Memorial Park • Harrisonburg, VA	Jailyn Ford, James Madison
2017	James Madison	Bank of the James Field at Veterans Memorial Park • Harrisonburg, VA	Megan Good, James Madison
2018	Hofstra	Bank of the James Field at Veterans Memorial Park • Harrisonburg, VA	Sophie Dandola, Hofstra
2019	James Madison	Bank of the James Field at Veterans Memorial Park • Harrisonburg, VA	Odicci Alexander, James Madison
2020	Canceled due to the COVID-19 pandemic.		
2021	James Madison	Bank of the James Field at Veterans Memorial Park • Harrisonburg, VA	Kate Gordon, James Madison
2022	UNC Wilmington	Hunt Softball Park • Elon, NC	Emily Winstead, UNC Wilmington
2023	Hofstra	Bill Edwards Stadium • Hempstead, NY	Meghan Giordano, Hofstra
2024	UNC Wilmington	Boseman Field • Wilmington, NC	Kara Hammock, UNC Wilmington
2025	Elon	Amanda Littlejohn Stadium • Buies Creek, NC	Kaitlyn Wells, Elon
2026	Charleston	Hunt Softball Park • Elon, NC	Mackenzie Mathis, Charleston

=== By school ===
School	Championships	Years
Hofstra	13	2002, 2003, 2004, 2005, 2006, 2007, 2008, 2010, 2012, 2013, 2015, 2018, 2023
James Madison	6	2009, 2014, 2016, 2017, 2019, 2021
UNC Wilmington	2	2022, 2024
Charleston	1	2026
Elon	1	2025
Georgia State	1	2011

Italics indicates the school currently does not sponsor softball in the CAA.
