= 2000 UCLA Bruins softball team =

American college softball season

2000 UCLA Bruins softball

NCAA Regional No. 4 champion

Women's College World Series, runner-up
- Conference: Pacific-10 Conference
- Record: 46–12–1 (14–7 Pac-10)
- Head coach: Sue Enquist (12th season)
- Home stadium: Easton Stadium

2000 Pacific-10 Conference softball standings
	Conf.						Overall
Team	W		L		T	PCT	W		L		T	PCT
No. 5 Washington ‍†‍‍^{y}	17	–	4	–	0	.810	62	–	9	–	0	.873
No. 3 Arizona ‍‍‍^{y}	16	–	4	–	0	.800	59	–	9	–	0	.868
No. 2 UCLA ‍‍‍^{y}	14	–	7	–	0	.667	46	–	12	–	1	.788
No. 18 Stanford ‍‍‍^{y}	9	–	12	–	0	.429	45	–	18	–	0	.714
No. 10 Arizona State ‍‍‍^{y}	8	–	13	–	0	.381	43	–	20	–	0	.683
No. 12 Oregon State ‍‍‍^{y}	7	–	13	–	0	.350	40	–	21	–	1	.653
No. 7 California ‍‍‍^{y}	6	–	15	–	0	.286	49	–	25	–	0	.662
No. 16 Oregon ‍‍‍^{y}	6	–	15	–	0	.286	36	–	29	–	0	.554
† – Conference champion y – Invited to the NCAA tournament As of June 30, 2000; Rankings from NFCA/USA Today

The 2000 UCLA Bruins softball team represented the University of California, Los Angeles in the 2000 NCAA Division I softball season. The Bruins were coached by Sue Enquist, in her twelfth season as head coach. The Bruins played their home games at Easton Stadium and finished with a record of 46–12–1. They competed in the Pacific-10 Conference, where they finished third with a 14–7 record.

The Bruins were invited to the 2000 NCAA Division I softball tournament, where they swept the Regional and then completed a run to the title game of the Women's College World Series where they fell to champion Oklahoma.

== Personnel ==
=== Roster ===
2000 UCLA Bruins roster
Pitchers: 7 – Amanda Freed – sophomore; 12 – Stephanie Swenson – junior; 14 – Lauren Fendrick – freshman; 22 – Courtney Dale – junior; Catchers: 4 – Marin Noack – junior; 23 – Toria Auelua – freshman; 34 – Julie Marshall – senior	Infielders: 5 – Casey Hiraiwa - (redshirt) Sophomore; 6 – Jenny Gardner – junior; 18 – Julie Adams – senior; 21 – Tairia Mims – freshman; 33 – Lyndsey Klein – senior; 40 - Natasha Watley – freshman	Outfielders: 2 – Erin Rahn – sophomore; 3 – Lupe Brambila – junior; 10 – Crissy Buck – sophomore; 11 – Monique Mejia – freshman

=== Coaches ===
2000 UCLA Bruins softball coaching staff
- Sue Enquist – Head coach – 12th season
- Kelly Inouye-Perez – Assistant coach – 7th season
- Lisa Fernandez – Assistant coach – 4th season

== Schedule ==
Legend
	UCLA win
	UCLA loss
	Tie
*	Non-Conference game

2000 UCLA Bruins softball game log
Regular season

February
Date	Opponent	Rank	Site/stadium	Score	Overall record	Pac-10 record
Feb 4	vs Maryland*	No. 1	USF Softball Field • Tampa, FL	W 9–0^{5}	1–0	
Feb 4	vs Tennessee*	No. 1	USF Softball Field • Tampa, FL	W 10–0^{5}	2–0	
Feb 5	at South Florida*	No. 1	USF Softball Field • Tampa, FL	W 6–1	3–0	
Feb 5	vs FIU*	No. 1	USF Softball Field • Tampa, FL	W 11–0^{5}	4–0	
Feb 6	vs Tennessee*	No. 1	USF Softball Field • Tampa, FL	W 6–0	5–0	
Feb 6	vs Florida Atlantic*	No. 1	USF Softball Field • Tampa, FL	W 7–3	6–0	
Feb 10	vs Texas Tech*	No. 1	Rainbow Wahine Softball Stadium • Honolulu, HI	W 3–2	7–0	
Feb 11	vs Hofstra*	No. 1	Rainbow Wahine Softball Stadium • Honolulu, HI	W 6–1	8–0	
Feb 11	vs Texas*	No. 1	Rainbow Wahine Softball Stadium • Honolulu, HI	W 5–4^{8}	9–0	
Feb 12	vs No. 15 Long Beach State*	No. 1	Rainbow Wahine Softball Stadium • Honolulu, HI	W 6–0	10–0	
Feb 12	at No. 20 Hawaii*	No. 1	Rainbow Wahine Softball Stadium • Honolulu, HI	W 9–1	11–0	
Feb 13	vs Hofstra*	No. 1	Rainbow Wahine Softball Stadium • Honolulu, HI	L 5–10	11–1	
Feb 17	vs Sacramento State*	No. 1	Sportsplex USA Poway • Poway, CA	L 1–2	11–2	
Feb 18	vs Pacific*	No. 1	Sportsplex USA Poway • Poway, CA	W 9–3	12–2	
Feb 18	vs No. 6 Michigan*	No. 1	Sportsplex USA Poway • Poway, CA	T 4–4^{6}	12–2–1	
Feb 19	vs Tennessee*	No. 1	Sportsplex USA Poway • Poway, CA	W 12–1	13–2–1	
Feb 19	vs No. 3 Fresno State*	No. 1	Sportsplex USA Poway • Poway, CA	W 5–2^{8}	14–2–1	
Feb 24	Cal State Northridge*	No. 2	Easton Stadium • Los Angeles, CA	W 4–0	15–2–1	
Feb 24	Cal State Northridge*	No. 2	Easton Stadium • Los Angeles, CA	W 1–0	16–2–1	
Feb 26	No. 5 Fresno State*	No. 2	Easton Stadium • Los Angeles, CA	W 5–0	17–2–1	
Feb 26	No. 5 Fresno State*	No. 2	Easton Stadium • Los Angeles, CA	W 3–0	18–2–1	

March
Date	Opponent	Rank	Site/stadium	Score	Overall record	Pac-10 record
Mar 3	vs Loyola Marymount*	No. 3	USD Softball Complex • San Diego, CA	W 2–0	19–2–1	
Mar 3	at San Diego*	No. 3	USD Softball Complex • San Diego, CA	W 2–0	20–2–1	
Mar 4	vs Saint Mary's*	No. 3	USD Softball Complex • San Diego, CA	W 6–0	21–2–1	
Mar 9	vs Cal Poly*	No. 3	Bulldog Diamond • Fresno, CA	W 7–0	22–2–1	
Mar 10	vs Texas Tech*	No. 3	Bulldog Diamond • Fresno, CA	W 7–0	23–2–1	
Mar 10	vs Florida State*	No. 3	Bulldog Diamond • Fresno, CA	W 3–0	24–2–1	
Mar 11	vs Ole Miss*	No. 3	Bulldog Diamond • Fresno, CA	W 4–0	25–2–1	
Mar 11	vs Illinois State*	No. 3	Bulldog Diamond • Fresno, CA	L 2–3^{8}	25–3–1	
Mar 12	at No. 7 Fresno State*	No. 3	Bulldog Diamond • Fresno, CA	L 0–1	25–4–1	
Mar 31	at No. 4 California	No. 3	Levine-Fricke Field • Berkeley, CA	W 6–1	26–4–1	1–0

April
Date	Opponent	Rank	Site/stadium	Score	Overall record	Pac-10 record
Apr 1	at No. 8 Stanford	No. 3	Boyd & Jill Smith Family Stadium • Stanford, CA	W 1–0	27–4–1	2–0
Apr 2	at No. 8 Stanford	No. 3	Boyd & Jill Smith Family Stadium • Stanford, CA	W 8–0^{5}	28–4–1	3–0
Apr 7	at No. 22 Oregon	No. 3	Howe Field • Eugene, OR	W 6–0	29–4–1	4–0
Apr 8	at No. 12 Oregon State	No. 3	Corvallis, OR	W 4–1	30–4–1	5–0
Apr 9	at No. 12 Oregon State	No. 3	Corvallis, OR	W 8–7	31–4–1	6–0
Apr 14	No. 2 Arizona	No. 3	Easton Stadium • Los Angeles, CA	L 4–6	31–5–1	6–1
Apr 15	No. 4 Arizona State	No. 3	Easton Stadium • Los Angeles, CA	W 5–1	32–5–1	7–1
Apr 16	No. 4 Arizona State	No. 3	Easton Stadium • Los Angeles, CA	L 0–1	32–6–1	7–2
Apr 21	at No. 1 Washington	No. 3	Husky Softball Stadium • Seattle, WA	L 1–3	32–7–1	7–3
Apr 22	at No. 1 Washington	No. 3	Husky Softball Stadium • Seattle, WA	W 1–0	33–7–1	8–3
Apr 28	No. 11 Stanford	No. 3	Easton Stadium • Los Angeles, CA	L 1–2^{10}	33–8–1	8–4
Apr 29	No. 9 California	No. 3	Easton Stadium • Los Angeles, CA	W 8–0^{6}	34–8–1	9–4
Apr 30	No. 9 California	No. 3	Easton Stadium • Los Angeles, CA	W 5–0	35–8–1	10–4

May
Date	Opponent	Rank	Site/stadium	Score	Overall record	Pac-10 record
May 5	at No. 5 Arizona State	No. 3	Alberta B. Farrington Softball Stadium • Tempe, AZ	W 2–0	36–8–1	11–4
May 6	at No. 2 Arizona	No. 3	Rita Hillenbrand Memorial Stadium • Tucson, AZ	L 9–12^{9}	36–9–1	11–5
May 7	at No. 2 Arizona	No. 3	Rita Hillenbrand Memorial Stadium • Tucson, AZ	L 1–9^{5}	36–10–1	11–6
May 10	No. 1 Washington	No. 3	Easton Stadium • Los Angeles, CA	L 1–4	36–11–1	11–7
May 12	No. 13 Oregon State	No. 3	Easton Stadium • Los Angeles, CA	W 6–1	37–11–1	12–7
May 13	No. 19 Oregon	No. 3	Easton Stadium • Los Angeles, CA	W 5–2	38–11–1	13–7
May 13	No. 19 Oregon	No. 3	Easton Stadium • Los Angeles, CA	W 12–4^{6}	39–11–1	14–7

Postseason

NCAA Regional No. 4
Date	Opponent	Rank	Site/stadium	Score	Overall record	NCAAT record
May 18	Canisius	No. 3	Easton Stadium • Los Angeles, CA	W 8–0^{5}	40–11–1	1–0
May 19	No. 20 Long Beach State	No. 3	Easton Stadium • Los Angeles, CA	W 10–4	41–11–1	2–0
May 20	No. 24 Florida State	No. 3	Easton Stadium • Los Angeles, CA	W 6–1	42–11–1	3–0
May 21	No. 16 Southwestern Louisiana	No. 3	Easton Stadium • Los Angeles, CA	W 7–1	43–11–1	4–0

NCAA Women's College World Series
Date	Opponent	Rank	Site/stadium	Score	Overall record	WCWS Record
May 25	No. 11 Alabama	No. 3	ASA Hall of Fame Stadium • Oklahoma City, OK	W 4–1	44–11–1	1–0
May 26	No. 1 Washington	No. 3	ASA Hall of Fame Stadium • Oklahoma City, OK	W 3–2	45–11–1	1–1
May 28	No. 8 Southern Miss	No. 3	ASA Hall of Fame Stadium • Oklahoma City, OK	W 6–0	46–11–1	2–1
May 29	No. 4 Oklahoma	No. 3	ASA Hall of Fame Stadium • Oklahoma City, OK	L 1–3	46–12–1	3–1

== Ranking movements ==
Ranking movements Legend: ██ Increase in ranking ██ Decrease in ranking
	Week													
Poll	Pre	1	2	3	4	5	6	7	8	9	10	11	12	Final
NFCA/USA Today	1	2	3	3	4	3	3	3	3	3	3	3	3	2
