= 2000 Arizona Wildcats softball team =

American college softball season

2000 Arizona Wildcats softball

NCAA Regional champion

Women's College World Series, T-3rd
- Conference: Pacific-10 Conference
- Record: 59–9 (16–4 Pac-10)
- Head coach: Mike Candrea (15th season)
- Home stadium: Rita Hillenbrand Memorial Stadium

2000 Pacific-10 Conference softball standings
	Conf.						Overall
Team	W		L		T	PCT	W		L		T	PCT
No. 5 Washington ‍†‍‍^{y}	17	–	4	–	0	.810	62	–	9	–	0	.873
No. 3 Arizona ‍‍‍^{y}	16	–	4	–	0	.800	59	–	9	–	0	.868
No. 2 UCLA ‍‍‍^{y}	14	–	7	–	0	.667	46	–	12	–	1	.788
No. 18 Stanford ‍‍‍^{y}	9	–	12	–	0	.429	45	–	18	–	0	.714
No. 10 Arizona State ‍‍‍^{y}	8	–	13	–	0	.381	43	–	20	–	0	.683
No. 12 Oregon State ‍‍‍^{y}	7	–	13	–	0	.350	40	–	21	–	1	.653
No. 7 California ‍‍‍^{y}	6	–	15	–	0	.286	49	–	25	–	0	.662
No. 16 Oregon ‍‍‍^{y}	6	–	15	–	0	.286	36	–	29	–	0	.554
† – Conference champion y – Invited to the NCAA tournament As of June 30, 2000; Rankings from NFCA/USA Today

The 2000 Arizona Wildcats softball team represented the University of Arizona in the 2000 NCAA Division I softball season. The Wildcats were coached by Mike Candrea, who led his fifteenth season. The Wildcats finished with a record of 59–9. They competed in the Pacific-10 Conference, where they finished second with a 16–4 record.

The Wildcats were invited to the 2000 NCAA Division I softball tournament, where they won the Regional and advanced to their thirteenth Women's College World Series. Arizona finished tied for third place with wins over California and Washington and losses to fellow semifinalist Southern Miss and champion Oklahoma.

== Personnel ==
=== Roster ===
2000 Arizona Wildcats roster
Pitchers: 0 - Becky Lemke - Junior; 2 - Teresa Ayoub - Junior; 27 - Jennie Finch - Sophomore; Catchers: 42 - Lindsey Collins - Junior	Infielders: 5 - Katie Swan - Senior; 6 - April Richardson - Junior; 8 - Lisha Ribellia - Freshman; 9 - Leneah Manuma - Freshman; 14 - Lindsey Rice - Freshman; 24 - Lauren Bauer - Junior; 25 - Allison Andrade - Junior; 32 - Toni Mascarenas - Junior	Outfielders: 3 - Lindsay Robinson - Senior; 4 - Nicole Giordano - Junior; 7 - Erika Hanson - Junior; 99 - Chrissy Gil - Senior

=== Coaches ===
2000 Arizona Wildcats softball coaching staff
- Mike Candrea - Head coach - 15th season
- Stacy Iveson - Assistant coach - 6th season
- Amy Chellevold - Assistant coach - 7th season

== Schedule ==
Legend
	Arizona win
	Arizona loss
*	Non-Conference game

2000 Arizona Wildcats softball game log
Regular season

February
Date	Opponent	Rank	Site/stadium	Score	Overall record	Pac-10 record
Feb 4	No. 5 Southern Miss*	No. 4	Rita Hillenbrand Memorial Stadium • Tucson, AZ (Arizona Classic)	W 9–1 ^{(5)}	1–0	
Feb 5	No. 2 Washington*	No. 4	Rita Hillenbrand Memorial Stadium • Tucson, AZ (Arizona Classic)	L 0–1	1–1	
Feb 6	No. 5 Southern Miss*	No. 4	Rita Hillenbrand Memorial Stadium • Tucson, AZ (Arizona Classic)	W 10–2 ^{(5)}	2–1	
Feb 11	vs Georgia*	No. 4	Sun Devil Club Stadium • Tempe, AZ (Kajikawa Classic)	W 11–1 ^{(5)}	3–1	
Feb 11	vs No. 18 South Carolina*	No. 4	Sun Devil Club Stadium • Tempe, AZ (Kajikawa Classic)	W 3–2	4–1	
Feb 12	vs Texas A&M*	No. 4	Sun Devil Club Stadium • Tempe, AZ (Kajikawa Classic)	W 9–0	5–1	
Feb 12	vs Chattanooga*	No. 4	Sun Devil Club Stadium • Tempe, AZ (Kajikawa Classic)	W 10–0 ^{(5)}	6–1	
Feb 13	vs No. 3 Fresno State*	No. 4	Sun Devil Club Stadium • Tempe, AZ (Kajikawa Classic)	W 3–0	7–1	
Feb 13	vs UNLV*	No. 4	Sun Devil Club Stadium • Tempe, AZ (Kajikawa Classic)	W 10–1 ^{(6)}	8–1	
Feb 18	Penn State*	No. 4	Rita Hillenbrand Memorial Stadium • Tucson, AZ (Wildcat Invitational)	W 9–0 ^{(5)}	9–1	
Feb 18	Tennessee Tech*	No. 4	Rita Hillenbrand Memorial Stadium • Tucson, AZ (Wildcat Invitational)	W 15–0 ^{(5)}	10–1	
Feb 19	New Mexico*	No. 4	Rita Hillenbrand Memorial Stadium • Tucson, AZ (Wildcat Invitational)	W 17–1 ^{(5)}	11–1	
Feb 19	Kentucky*	No. 4	Rita Hillenbrand Memorial Stadium • Tucson, AZ (Wildcat Invitational)	W 8–0 ^{(5)}	12–1	
Feb 20	No. 8 Oklahoma*	No. 4	Rita Hillenbrand Memorial Stadium • Tucson, AZ (Wildcat Invitational)	W 6–0	13–1	
Feb 22	Simon Fraser*	No. 4	Rita Hillenbrand Memorial Stadium • Tucson, AZ	W 2–1	14–1	
Feb 25	vs No. 15 DePaul*	No. 3	Alabama Softball Complex • Tuscaloosa, AL (Bama Bash)	W 3–0	15–1	
Feb 25	vs Drake*	No. 3	Alabama Softball Complex • Tuscaloosa, AL (Bama Bash)	W 9–0 ^{(5)}	16–1	
Feb 26	at Alabama*	No. 3	Alabama Softball Complex • Tuscaloosa, AL (Bama Bash)	W 6–2	17–1	
Feb 26	vs Georgia Tech*	No. 3	Alabama Softball Complex • Tuscaloosa, AL (Bama Bash)	W 12–0 ^{(5)}	18–1	
Feb 26	vs Drake*	No. 3	Alabama Softball Complex • Tuscaloosa, AL (Bama Bash)	W 18–0 ^{(5)}	19–1	
Feb 27	vs No. 15 DePaul*	No. 3	Alabama Softball Complex • Tuscaloosa, AL (Bama Bash)	W 6–1	20–1	

March
Date	Opponent	Rank	Site/stadium	Score	Overall record	Pac-10 record
Mar 3	Tulsa*	No. 2	Rita Hillenbrand Memorial Stadium • Tucson, AZ (Hillenbrand Invitational)	W 10–0 ^{(5)}	21–1	
Mar 3	Northwestern*	No. 2	Rita Hillenbrand Memorial Stadium • Tucson, AZ (Hillenbrand Invitational)	W 8–0 ^{(5)}	22–1	
Mar 4	Saint Peter's*	No. 2	Rita Hillenbrand Memorial Stadium • Tucson, AZ (Hillenbrand Invitational)	W 10–0 ^{(6)}	23–1	
Mar 5	Indiana*	No. 2	Rita Hillenbrand Memorial Stadium • Tucson, AZ (Hillenbrand Invitational)	W 10–1	^{(6)}	24–1
Mar 5	Northwestern State*	No. 2	Rita Hillenbrand Memorial Stadium • Tucson, AZ (Hillenbrand Invitational)	W 8–0 ^{(6)}	25–1	
Mar 11	BYU*	No. 2	Rita Hillenbrand Memorial Stadium • Tucson, AZ	W 2–0	26–1	
Mar 11	BYU*	No. 2	Rita Hillenbrand Memorial Stadium • Tucson, AZ	W 10–0 ^{(5)}	27–1	
Mar 14	at No. 7 Fresno State*	No. 2	Margie Wright Diamond • Fresno, CA	W 2–0	28–1	
Mar 14	at No. 7 Fresno State*	No. 2	Margie Wright Diamond • Fresno, CA	W 3–1 ^{(10}	29–1	
Mar 16	vs Louisiana–Monroe*	No. 2	Anderson Family Field • Fullerton, CA (Judi Garman Classic)	W 3–0	30–1	
Mar 16	at No. 9 Cal State Fullerton*	No. 2	Anderson Family Field • Fullerton, CA (Judi Garman Classic)	W 6–0	31–1	
Mar 17	vs No. 22 Hawaii*	No. 2	Anderson Family Field • Fullerton, CA (Judi Garman Classic)	W 1–0 ^{(8)}	32–1	
Mar 18	vs UNLV*	No. 2	Anderson Family Field • Fullerton, CA (Judi Garman Classic)	W 4–0	33–1	
Mar 18	vs Cal State Northridge*	No. 2	Anderson Family Field • Fullerton, CA (Judi Garman Classic)	W 6–0	34–1	
Mar 19	vs Notre Dame*	No. 2	Anderson Family Field • Fullerton, CA (Judi Garman Classic)	W 6–3	35–1	
Mar 19	vs No. 1 Washington*	No. 2	Anderson Family Field • Fullerton, CA (Judi Garman Classic)	L 1–6	35–2	
Mar 28	New Mexico State*	No. 2	Rita Hillenbrand Memorial Stadium • Tucson, AZ	L 1–2	35–3	
Mar 28	New Mexico State*	No. 2	Rita Hillenbrand Memorial Stadium • Tucson, AZ	W 7–1	36–3	
Mar 31	No. 23 Oregon	No. 2	Rita Hillenbrand Memorial Stadium • Tucson, AZ	W 3–2 ^{(8)}	37–3	1–0

April
Date	Opponent	Rank	Site/stadium	Score	Overall record	Pac-10 record
Apr 1	No. 11 Oregon State	No. 2	Rita Hillenbrand Memorial Stadium • Tucson, AZ	W 11–0 ^{(5)}	38–3	2–0
Apr 2	No. 11 Oregon State	No. 2	Rita Hillenbrand Memorial Stadium • Tucson, AZ	W 4–1	39–3	3–0
Apr 4	No. 4 Arizona State	No. 2	Rita Hillenbrand Memorial Stadium • Tucson, AZ	W 3–1	40–3	4–0
Apr 7	No. 7 California	No. 2	Rita Hillenbrand Memorial Stadium • Tucson, AZ	W 4–1	41–3	5–0
Apr 8	No. 9 Stanford	No. 2	Rita Hillenbrand Memorial Stadium • Tucson, AZ	W 8–4	42–3	6–0
Apr 9	No. 9 Stanford	No. 2	Rita Hillenbrand Memorial Stadium • Tucson, AZ	L 3–4 ^{(8)}	42–4	6–1
Apr 13	at Cal State Northridge*	No. 2	Matador Diamond • Northridge, CA	W 6–0	43–4	
Apr 14	at No. 3 UCLA	No. 2	Easton Stadium • Los Angeles, CA	W 6–4	44–4	7–1
Apr 15	at No. 1 Washington	No. 2	Husky Softball Stadium • Seattle, WA	L 0–2	44–5	7–2
Apr 16	at No. 1 Washington	No. 2	Husky Softball Stadium • Seattle, WA	L 0–7	44–6	7–3
Apr 21	at No. 4 Arizona State	No. 2	Sun Devil Club Stadium • Tempe, AZ	L 1–3	44–7	7–4
Apr 22	at No. 4 Arizona State	No. 2	Sun Devil Club Stadium • Tempe, AZ	W 3–0	45–7	8–4
Apr 29	at No. 17 Oregon	No. 2	Howe Field • Eugene, OR	W 2–0	46–7	9–4
Apr 30	at No. 17 Oregon	No. 2	Howe Field • Eugene, OR	W 1–0	47–7	10–4

May
Date	Opponent	Rank	Site/stadium	Score	Overall record	Pac-10 record
May 5	No. 1 Washington	No. 2	Rita Hillenbrand Memorial Stadium • Tucson, AZ	W 3–2	48–7	11–4
May 6	No. 3 UCLA	No. 2	Rita Hillenbrand Memorial Stadium • Tucson, AZ	W 12–9	49–7	12–4
May 7	No. 3 UCLA	No. 2	Rita Hillenbrand Memorial Stadium • Tucson, AZ	W 9–1	50–7	13–4
May 12	at No. 9 Stanford	No. 2	Boyd & Jill Smith Family Stadium • Stanford, CA	W 9–0 ^{(5)}	51–7	14–4
May 13	at No. 10 California	No. 2	Levine-Fricke Field • Berkeley, CA	W 8–3	52–7	15–4
May 13	at No. 10 California	No. 2	Levine-Fricke Field • Berkeley, CA	W 8–3	53–7	16–4

Postseason

NCAA Regional
Date	Opponent	Rank	Site/stadium	Score	Overall record	NCAAT record
May 18	Middle Tennessee State	No. 2	Rita Hillenbrand Memorial Stadium • Tucson, AZ	W 8–0 ^{(6)}	54–7	1–0
May 19	UMass	No. 2	Rita Hillenbrand Memorial Stadium • Tucson, AZ	W 10–0 ^{(6)}	55–7	2–0
May 20	Nebraska	No. 2	Rita Hillenbrand Memorial Stadium • Tucson, AZ	W 13–0 ^{(5)}	56–7	3–0
May 21	Nebraska	No. 2	Rita Hillenbrand Memorial Stadium • Tucson, AZ	W 5–0	57–7	4–0

NCAA Women's College World Series
Date	Opponent	Rank	Site/stadium	Score	Overall record	WCWS Record
May 25	No. 8 Southern Miss	No. 2	ASA Hall of Fame Stadium • Oklahoma City, OK	L 0–1	57–8	0–1
May 27	No. 10 California	No. 2	ASA Hall of Fame Stadium • Oklahoma City, OK	W 6–0	58–8	1–1
May 27	No. 1 Washington	No. 2	ASA Hall of Fame Stadium • Oklahoma City, OK	W 4–2	59–8	2–1
May 28	No. 4 Oklahoma	No. 2	ASA Hall of Fame Stadium • Oklahoma City, OK	L 0–1	59–9	2–2

== Ranking movements ==
Ranking movements Legend: ██ Increase in ranking ██ Decrease in ranking
	Week												
Poll	Pre	1	2	3	4	5	6	7	8	9	10	11	Final
NFCA/USA Today	4	3	2	2	2	2	2	2	2	2	2	2	3
