= Odicci Alexander =

American softball pitcher (born 1998)

Bandits
- Pitcher
- Born: April 2, 1998 (age 28); Boydton, Virginia, U.S.
- Bats: Right Throws: Right

Professional debut
- June 17, 2021, for the USSSA Pride

Teams
- James Madison (2017–2021); USSSA Pride (2021–2022); Toda Medics (2022); Chicago Bandits (2025–present)

Career highlights and awards
- Softball America Pitcher of the Year (2021); WCWS All-Tournament Team (2021); CAA Pitcher of the Year (2021); Second Team All-American (2021); 2× CAA Player of the Year (2018, 2019); 2× Third team All-American (2018, 2019)

Odicci Patrice Alexander (born April 2, 1998) is an American professional softball player for the Chicago Bandits of the Athletes Unlimited Softball League (AUSL). She was the starting pitcher for James Madison University from 2017 to 2021, leading the team to their first-ever Women's College World Series in 2021 and making it to the semi-finals. After the 2021 season, Alexander was named Softball America Pitcher of the Year and was also nominated for an ESPY Award for best female college athlete. She most recently played in the Athletes Unlimited Softball where she won the 2023 championship as the top individual points leader.

== Early life ==
Alexander grew up in Boydton, Virginia, and was raised by her grandparents. Her older brother, Isiah Maurice, played college basketball for Kansas State from 2016 to 2017. Alexander started playing softball at the age of 7 and taught herself how to pitch. She attended Park View High School, where she earned Second Team All-State honors as a sophomore. She was an accidental recruit, when then-James Madison Softball coach Mickey Dean attended one of her high school games in 2014 eyeing the pitcher on the other team but ended up offering Alexander a scholarship to JMU. Alexander also played for the Beverly Bandits club softball team.

== College career ==
=== Freshman Year ===
Alexander made her debut for James Madison on February 10, 2017, against Charleston Southern where she recorded 8 strikeouts and led the team to a 13–3 victory. She finished the season with a 11–5 record, a 2.35 ERA, 6 shutouts, and 83 strikeouts. At the plate, Alexander had a .333 batting average with 49 hits, 36, RBIs, and 7 home runs. Alexander was named the 2017 CAA rookie of the year.

=== Sophomore Year ===
In her sophomore year, Alexander went 23–5 with a 1.95 ERA and 193 strikeouts. In addition, she batted .388 with 65 hits, 13 homeruns, and a team-best 47 RBIs. She was named the 2018 CAA Player of the Year as well as First-Team All CAA and First-Team All ECAC. In addition, Alexander was selected as a third-team NFCA All-American and first team NFCA All-Northeast Region.

=== Junior Year ===
During the 2019 season as a junior, Alexander went 24–1 with 178 strikeouts, 8 shutouts, and a career-high 1.70 ERA. She also batted .316 with 55 hits, 56 RBIs, and 14 homeruns. During the week of April 30, she was named USA Softball's Player of the Week for going 5-0 and pitching 14 innings with 15 strikeouts as well as batting .500 for the week. After shutting out Elon in the final round of the CAA Championship on May 10, Alexander was named the most outstanding player of the tournament. She helped JMU advance to their second-ever NCAA Super Regional before being eliminated after losing to UCLA twice. Alexander was again named an NFCA Third Team All-American, NFCA First Team All-Northeast, CAA Player of the Year, and ECAC Player of the year.

=== Senior Year ===
In a 2020 season that was shortened by the COVID-19 pandemic, Alexander went 3–1 with 31 strikeouts, and batted .308 with 6 hits and 4 RBIs.

=== Redshirt senior year ===
Alexander chose to return for her fifth year of eligibility in 2021. She finished off her college career with her most successful season, despite not playing for a month—from March 12 to April 17—due to a hamstring injury. She finished 26–6 with 204 strikeouts and a 1.71 ERA, and batted .317 with 26 hits, 13 RBIs, and 2 home runs. During the week of May 4, Alexander was named D1Softball's player of the week after recording 25 strikeouts and allowing only one hit in two games, with one of them being a perfect game. On May 12, Alexander set a CAA tournament record for single-game strikeouts, recording 16 of them in a no-hitter against Delaware. On May 21, she threw a career-high and a JMU single-game record of 19 strikeouts against Liberty in the NCAA Regionals.

Starting in all three games against Missouri and winning two out of three, Alexander helped James Madison advance to their program's first Women's College World Series. In Alexander's 2021 Women's College World Series debut on June 3, James Madison upset number-one seeded Oklahoma 4–3 after eight innings. The next day, James Madison defeated Oklahoma State 2–1 to advance to the semi-finals and become the first unseeded team in Women's College World Series history to win two games in the tournament. During the top of the seventh inning when Oklahoma State had runners on second and third base, Alexander fielded a bunt and proceeded to dive to tag out OSU's Scotland David at home plate to secure the victory for JMU. The play later went viral on the internet and was named the #1 defensive play of the tournament by the NCAA. Alexander ended her college career after JMU was eliminated in the semi-finals after losing twice in rematches against Oklahoma 3-6 and 1-7 respectively. After being pulled out in the fifth inning during the second semifinal match on June 7, she received a standing ovation from the crowd. She finished the tournament starting all four games that JMU played with 66 strikeouts on 1,057 pitches.

Following the 2021 season, Alexander was named an NFCA Second-Team All American, Softball America Pitcher of the Year, D1 Softball Woman of the Year, CAA Pitcher of the Year, and was nominated for an ESPY award.

== Professional career ==
On June 13, 2021, Alexander signed a professional contract with the USSSA Pride, joining former JMU players Megan Good and Jailyn Ford. She also signed to play in Athletes Unlimited Softball second season beginning in August 2021. She made her pro debut on June 17 against Team Mexico, recording 8 strikeouts in a 7–6 loss. She had her first win when she started in a 3–2 victory against Team Canada on June 23, pitching the entire game with 8 strikeouts, 4 hits, and 3 walks.

She won the 2023 Athletes Unlimited Softball championship as the top individual points leader with 1,994 points.

On January 29, 2025, Alexander was drafted 40th overall by the Bandits in the inaugural Athletes Unlimited Softball League draft.
