= 2000 NCAA Division I softball rankings =

2000 NCAA Division I softball season
- Defending Champions: UCLA

Tournament

Women's College World Series
- Champions: Oklahoma (1st title)
- Runners-up: UCLA (17th WCWS Appearance)
- Winning Coach: Patty Gasso (1st title)
- WCWS MOP: Jennifer Stewart (Oklahoma)

Seasons
- ← 1999 2001 →

The following human polls make up the 2000 NCAA Division I women's softball rankings. The NFCA/USA Today Poll is voted on by a panel of 32 Division I softball coaches and ranks to top 25 teams nationally.

== Legend ==
	Increase in ranking
	Decrease in ranking
	Not ranked previous week
Italics	Number of first place votes
(#–#)	Win-loss record
т	Tied with team above or below also with this symbol

== NFCA/USA Today ==
	Week 0 Pre	Week 1 Feb 23	Week 2 Mar 1	Week 3 Mar 8	Week 4 Mar 15	Week 5 Mar 22	Week 6 Mar 29	Week 7 Apr 5	Week 8 Apr 12	Week 9 Apr 19	Week 10 Apr 26	Week 11 May 3	Week 12 May 10	Week Final May 31	
1.	UCLA (25)	Washington (16) 13–1	Washington (27) (18–1)	Washington (27) (24–1)	Washington (27) (24–1)	Washington (27) (31–1)	Washington (22) (36–3)	Washington (22) (38–4)	Washington (27) (41–4)	Washington (26) (46–4)	Washington (27) (47–5)	Washington (27) (50–5)	Washington (22) (54–6)	Oklahoma (27) (66–8)	1.
2.	Washington (1)	UCLA (10) 14–3	Arizona (20–1)	Arizona (25–1)	Arizona (27–1)	Arizona (35–2)	Arizona (5) (35–2)	Arizona (5) (39–3)	Arizona (42–4)	Arizona (1) (44–6)	Arizona (45–7)	Arizona (47–7)	Arizona (5) (50–7)	UCLA (46–12–1)	2.
3.	Fresno State (1)	Arizona (1) 8–1	UCLA (18–3)	UCLA (21–3)	Arizona State (25–4)	UCLA (25–5)	UCLA (25–5)	UCLA (28–5)	UCLA (31–5)	UCLA (32–7)	UCLA (33–7–1)	UCLA (35–8–1)	UCLA (36–10–1)	Arizona (59–9)	3.
4.	Arizona	LSU (9–1)	Arizona State (12–1)	Arizona State (19–3)	UCLA (26–5)	California (34–4)	California (37–5)	Arizona State (34–6)	Arizona State (36–9)	Fresno State (42–9)	Arizona State (38–11)	Oklahoma (55–6)	Oklahoma (55–6)	Southern Miss (63–13)	4.
5.	Southern Miss	Fresno State (8–2)	LSU (13–2) т	Oklahoma (23–2)	California (27–2)	Arizona State (29–5)	Arizona State (32–5)	Fresno State (30–9)	Fresno State (36–9)	Arizona State (37–10)	Oklahoma (50–6)	Arizona State (39–13)	Arizona State (39–16)	Washington (61–9)	5.
6.	Michigan	Arizona State (12–1)	Oklahoma (19–1) т	California (22–1)	Oklahoma (27–4)	Fresno State (24–9) т	Fresno State (30–9)	Oklahoma (40–5)	Oklahoma (43–5)	Oklahoma (48–6)	Fresno State (44–11)	Fresno State (46–11)	Fresno State (47–12)	Alabama (66–14)	6.
7.	LSU	Oklahoma (7–0)	California (19–1)	Fresno State (15–5)	Fresno State (21–5)	Oklahoma (34–5) т	Oklahoma (36–5)	California (38–9)	LSU (37–7)	LSU (42–8)	LSU (47–8)	LSU (51–8)	LSU (53–10)	California (49–25)	7.
8.	Oklahoma	California (13–0)	Fresno State (8–4)	LSU (16–4)	LSU (19–6)	Stanford (22–3)	Stanford (29–4)	LSU (31–7)	California (39–11)	Southern Miss (42–10)	Southern Miss (48–10)	Southern Miss (51–10)	Southern Miss (54–10)	DePaul (40–22)	8.
9.	Arizona State	Michigan (3–2)	Stanford (16–1)	Stanford (20–3)	Cal State Fullerton (22–2)	LSU (22–7)	LSU (25–7)	Stanford (30–7)	Stanford (33–9)	California (39–14)	California (41–15)	California (41–18)	Stanford (44–14)	LSU (59–12)	9.
10.	Louisiana–Lafayette	Southern Miss (10–6)	Oregon State (13–4–1)	Oregon State (17–4–1)	Stanford (20–3)	Southern Miss (29–7)	Southern Miss (30–8)	Southern Miss (34–9)	Southern Miss (39–10)	Alabama (49–8)	Alabama (53–8)	Stanford (39–14)	California (44–20)	Arizona State (43–20) т	10.
11.	Oregon State	Stanford (11–1)	Cal State Fullerton (16–2) т	Cal State Fullerton (17–2)	Southern Miss (23–7)	Cal State Fullerton (24–5)	Oregon State (25–6–1)	Michigan (26–6)	Alabama (46–7)	Michigan (33–8)	Stanford (36–12)	Alabama (57–8)	Alabama (59–10)	Fresno State (54–14) т	11.
12.	California	Oregon State (5–1–1)	Southern Miss (14–7) т	Southern Miss (18–7)	Oregon State (18–4–1)	Oregon State (22–6–1)	Cal State Fullerton (28–7)	Oregon State (26–9–1)	Michigan (28–7)	Stanford (34–11)	Oregon State (33–13–1)	Oregon State (34–14–1)	Cal State Fullerton (43–11)	Oregon State (40–21–1)	12.
13.	Nebraska	Louisiana–Lafayette (1–1)	Iowa (5–0)	Michigan (12–6)	Alabama (28–5)	Michigan (18–6)	Michigan (22–6)	Alabama (42–7)	Iowa (27–7)	Oregon State (31–13–1)	Michigan (34–11–1)	Michigan (36–11–1)	Oregon State (36–17–1)	Michigan (44–17)	13.
14.	DePaul	Iowa (5–0)	Michigan (6–4)	Iowa (8–1)	Iowa (13–2) т	Alabama (33–6)	Alabama (37–6)	Iowa (24–7)	Oregon State (26–12–1)	Iowa (31–8)	Cal State Fullerton (37–11)	Cal State Fullerton (40–11)	Michigan (40–13–1)	Nebraska (52–21)	14.
15.	Long Beach State	DePaul (0–0)	Louisiana–Lafayette (7–1)	Alabama (20–5)	Michigan (12–6) т	Louisiana–Lafayette (19–6)	Iowa (18–7)	Long Beach State (27–11)	Long Beach State (30–13) т	Cal State Fullerton (34–11)	Iowa (34–10)	Iowa (39–11)	Iowa (42–12)	Iowa (46–15)	15.
16.	UMass	Cal State Fullerton (11–1)	Alabama (16–3)	Louisiana–Lafayette (11–3)	Louisiana–Lafayette (17–3)	Iowa (14–7)	Louisiana-Lafayette (23–10)	Cal State Fullerton (28–7)	Louisiana–Lafayette (32–11) т	Louisiana–Lafayette (39–12)	Louisiana–Lafayette (39–13)	Oregon (33–20)	Louisiana–Lafayette (44–13)	Oregon (35–29)	16.
17.	Michigan State	Hawaii (4–2)	UIC (16–8)	Oklahoma State (17–5)	South Carolina (18–9)	South Carolina (22–11)	Long Beach State (24–11)	Louisiana–Lafayette (27–9)	Cal State Fullerton (31–11)	Long Beach State (31–15)	Oregon (30–18)	Louisiana–Lafayette (44–13)	Notre Dame (46–12)	Florida State (51–27)	17.
18.	South Carolina	UIC (12–6)	South Carolina (9–5)	South Carolina (11–7)	Oklahoma State (21–9)	Oklahoma State (23–9)	South Carolina (24–13)	South Carolina (27–15)	Notre Dame (29–9)	Oregon (29–17)	Long Beach State (34–17)	Long Beach State (36–18)	Nebraska (45–18)	Stanford (45–18)	18.
19.	Texas	Long Beach State (7–5)	Hawaii (6–2)	UIC (17–12)	Long Beach State (14–8)	Long Beach State (20–10)	Mississippi State (27–9)	Mississippi State (30–10)	South Carolina (29–17)	Notre Dame (34–10)	Notre Dame (39–12)	Notre Dame (43–12)	Oregon (34–24)	Cal State Fullerton (45–15)	19.
20.	Hawaii	Alabama (12–1)	DePaul (3–3)	Long Beach State (10–6)	UIC (22–13)	UIC (29–16)	Oklahoma State (24–11)	Oklahoma State (27–12)	Mississippi State (31–15)	Mississippi State (36–16)	Nebraska (37–18)	Nebraska (42–18)	Long Beach State (37–20)	Utah (42–23)	20.
21.	Stanford	Nebraska (4–7)	Oklahoma State (12–4)	Hawaii (9–5)	Mississippi State (18–7)	Mississippi State (23–8)	Notre Dame (22–8)	Notre Dame (26–9)	Florida Atlantic (47–13)	South Carolina (30–18)	Mississippi State (37–20)	Mississippi State (40–22)	Florida Atlantic (55–15)	Mississippi State (44–27)	21.
22.	UIC	South Carolina (3–4)	Long Beach State (7–5)	DePaul (5–7)	Hawaii (8–5)	Notre Dame (18–6)	UIC (32–19)	Oregon (24–13)	Oklahoma State (29–15)	Oklahoma State (32–16)	UIC (42–21)	Florida Atlantic (51–15)	Mississippi State (41–23)	Louisiana–Lafayette (45–15) т	22.
23.	Central Michigan	UMass (0–4)	Nebraska (5–6)	Oregon (11–8)	Oregon (11–8)	Oregon (17–10)	Oregon (23–11)	Florida Atlantic (43–13)	Oregon (24–16)	Florida Atlantic (47–13)	Oklahoma State (32–21)	UIC (46–23)	UIC (49–23)	South Carolina (40–28) т	23.
24.	Missouri	Michigan State (2–3)	Hofstra (3–4)	Mississippi State (12–5)	Texas A&M (17–7)	Florida (26–12)	East Carolina (35–4)	East Carolina (40–6)	East Carolina (43–7)	East Carolina (43–7)	Florida Atlantic (51–15) т	Oklahoma State (33–20)	Florida State (28–25)	Notre Dame (47–14)	24.
25.	Iowa	Oklahoma State (10–2) т Oregon (7–3) т	Oregon (8–7)	Texas A&M (16–7)	Florida (24–10)	Texas A&M (20–10)	Florida Atlantic (36–13)	UIC (35–20)	UIC (37–20)	UIC (40–21)	South Carolina (31–25) т	South Carolina (33–25)	South Carolina (35–25)	Florida (46–30)	25.
	Week 0 Pre	Week 1 Feb 23	Week 2 Mar 1	Week 3 Mar 8	Week 4 Mar 15	Week 5 Mar 22	Week 6 Mar 29	Week 7 Apr 5	Week 8 Apr 12	Week 9 Apr 19	Week 10 Apr 26	Week 11 May 3	Week 12 May 10	Week Final May 31	
		Dropped: 19. Texas; 23. Central Michigan; 24. Missouri	Dropped: 23. UMass; 24. Michigan State	Dropped: 23. Nebraska; 24. Hofstra	Dropped: 22. DePaul	Dropped: 22. Hawaii	Dropped: 24. Florida; 25. Texas A&M	None	None	None	Dropped: 24. East Carolina	None	Dropped: 24. Oklahoma State	Dropped: 20. Long Beach State; 21. Florida Atlantic; 23. UIC	
