= 2000 Oklahoma Sooners softball team =

American college softball season

2000 Oklahoma Sooners softball

Big 12 regular-season champions NCAA Norman Regional champions

National champions
- Conference: Big 12 Conference
- Record: 66–8 (17–1 Big 12)
- Head coach: Patty Gasso (6th season)
- Home stadium: OU Softball Complex

2000 Big 12 Conference softball standings
	Conf.						Overall
Team	W		L		T	PCT	W		L		T	PCT
No. 1 Oklahoma ‍†‍‍^{y}	17	–	1	–	0	.944	66	–	8	–	0	.892
No. 14 Nebraska ‍‍‡‍^{y}	15	–	2	–	0	.882	52	–	21	–	0	.712
Texas ‍‍‍^{y}	11	–	5	–	0	.688	30	–	27	–	1	.526
Texas A&M ‍‍‍^{y}	8	–	10	–	0	.444	32	–	23	–	0	.582
Oklahoma State ‍‍‍	8	–	10	–	0	.444	33	–	22	–	0	.600
Texas Tech ‍‍‍	7	–	10	–	0	.412	19	–	36	–	0	.345
Baylor ‍‍‍	7	–	11	–	0	.389	27	–	30	–	0	.474
Missouri ‍‍‍	6	–	12	–	0	.333	34	–	27	–	0	.557
Kansas ‍‍‍	5	–	13	–	0	.278	30	–	32	–	0	.484
Iowa State ‍‍‍	4	–	14	–	0	.222	18	–	29	–	0	.383
† – Conference champion ‡ – Tournament champion y – Invited to the NCAA tournament Rankings from NFCA/USA Today

The 2000 Oklahoma Sooners softball team was an American college softball team that represented the University of Oklahoma during the 2000 NCAA Division I softball season. The Sooners were led by Patty Gasso in her sixth season, and played their home games at OU Softball Complex. They competed in the Big 12 Conference, where they finished the season with a 66–8 record, including 17–1 in conference play.

The Sooners were invited to the 2000 NCAA Division I softball tournament, where they swept the West Regional and then completed a run through the Women's College World Series in their first appearance to claim the NCAA Women's College World Series Championship.

== Roster ==
2000 Oklahoma Sooners roster
Pitchers: - Kourtney Davis; - Lana Moran; - Jennifer Stewart; Catchers: - Ashli Barrett	Infielders: - Kelli Braitsch; - Lisa Carey; - Andrea Davis; - Mandy Fulton; - Leah Gulla; - Jennifer Stump; - LaKisha Washington	Outfielders: - Erin Evans; - Larissa Foley; - Christy Ring; - Jaime White; - Macey Wilson

== Schedule ==
2000 Oklahoma Sooners softball game log
Regular season (55–6)

February (19–1)
Date	Opponent	Rank	Site/stadium	Score	Overall record	Big 12 Record
Feb 11	vs Kentucky*	No. 8	Mike Lewis Park • Arlington, TX	**W** 5–0	1–0	
Feb 11	vs Louisiana–Monroe*	No. 8	Mike Lewis Park • Arlington, TX	**W** 2–0	2–0	
Feb 11	vs Purdue*	No. 8	Mike Lewis Park • Arlington, TX	**W** 6–1	3–0	
Feb 12	vs Texas State*	No. 8	Mike Lewis Park • Arlington, TX	**W** 9–0	4–0	
Feb 13	vs No. 5 Southern Miss*	No. 8	Mike Lewis Park • Arlington, TX	**W** 10–1	5–0	
Feb 13	vs Arkansas*	No. 8	Mike Lewis Park • Arlington, TX	**W** 5–3	6–0	
Feb 13	vs UTSA*	No. 8	Mike Lewis Park • Arlington, TX	**W** 3–2	7–0	
Feb 18	vs New Mexico*	No. 8	Rita Hillenbrand Memorial Stadium • Tucson, AZ	**W** 10–2	8–0	
Feb 18	vs Penn State*	No. 8	Rita Hillenbrand Memorial Stadium • Tucson, AZ	**W** 9–3	9–0	
Feb 19	vs Tennessee Tech*	No. 8	Rita Hillenbrand Memorial Stadium • Tucson, AZ	**W** 16–1	10–0	
Feb 20	vs Kentucky*	No. 8	Rita Hillenbrand Memorial Stadium • Tucson, AZ	**W** 13–4	11–0	
Feb 20	at No. 4 Arizona*	No. 8	Rita Hillenbrand Memorial Stadium • Tucson, AZ	**L** 0–6	11–1	
Feb 23	Arkansas*	No. 7	OU Softball Complex • Norman, OK	**W** 3–0	12–1	
Feb 23	Arkansas*	No. 7	OU Softball Complex • Norman, OK	**W** 6–2	13–1	
Feb 24	Missouri State*	No. 7	OU Softball Complex • Norman, OK	**W** 8–0	14–1	
Feb 25	No. 16 Cal State Fullerton*	No. 7	OU Softball Complex • Norman, OK	**W** 8–0	15–1	
Feb 25	Ole Miss*	No. 7	OU Softball Complex • Norman, OK	**W** 12–4	16–1	
Feb 26	Kansas*	No. 7	OU Softball Complex • Norman, OK	**W** 3–0	17–1	
Feb 26	Nicholls State*	No. 7	OU Softball Complex • Norman, OK	**W** 16–1	18–1	
Feb 27	Creighton*	No. 7	OU Softball Complex • Norman, OK	**W** 2–0	19–1	

March
Date	Opponent	Rank	Site/stadium	Score	Overall record	Big 12 Record
Mar 3	vs UMass*	No. 5	South Commons • Columbus, GA	**W** 9–2	20–1	
Mar 3	vs Mississippi State*	No. 5	South Commons • Columbus, GA	**W** 12–4	21–1	
Mar 4	vs No. 9 Stanford*	No. 5	South Commons • Columbus, GA	**W** 8–0	22–1	
Mar 4	vs Texas*	No. 5	South Commons • Columbus, GA	**W** 8–1	23–1	
Mar 5	vs No. 8 Fresno State*	No. 5	South Commons • Columbus, GA	**L** 0–1	23–2	
Mar 8	at Wichita State*	No. 5	Wilkins Stadium • Wichita, KS	**W** 10–0	24–2	
Mar 8	at Wichita State*	No. 5	Wilkins Stadium • Wichita, KS	**W** 11–0	25–2	
Mar 10	No. 8 LSU*	No. 5	OU Softball Complex • Norman, OK	**L** 0–3	25–3	
Mar 11	UTSA*	No. 5	OU Softball Complex • Norman, OK	**W** 5–3	26–3	
Mar 11	Colorado State*	No. 5	OU Softball Complex • Norman, OK	**W** 9–0	27–3	
Mar 12	No. 12 Southern Miss*	No. 5	OU Softball Complex • Norman, OK	**L** 4–5	27–4	
Mar 12	Wichita State*	No. 5	OU Softball Complex • Norman, OK	**W** 5–2	28–4	
Mar 14	at No. 20 Long Beach State*	No. 5	LBSU Softball Complex • Long Beach, CA	**W** 3–1	29–4	
Mar 14	at No. 20 Long Beach State*	No. 5	LBSU Softball Complex • Long Beach, CA	**W** 5–2	30–4	
Mar 16	vs No. 12 Oregon State*	No. 6	Titan Softball Complex • Fullerton, CA	**W** 9–0	31–4	
Mar 16	vs DePaul*	No. 6	Titan Softball Complex • Fullerton, CA	**W** 5–4	32–4	
Mar 17	vs UNLV*	No. 6	Titan Softball Complex • Fullerton, CA	**W** 10–5	33–4	
Mar 18	vs Louisiana–Monroe*	No. 6	Titan Softball Complex • Fullerton, CA	**W** 8–0	34–4	
Mar 18	vs Notre Dame*	No. 6	Titan Softball Complex • Fullerton, CA	**L** 2–4	34–5	
Mar 25	at No. 25 Texas A&M	No. 6	Aggie Softball Complex • College Station, TX	**W** 4–2	35–5	1–0
Mar 26	at No. 25 Texas A&M	No. 6	Aggie Softball Complex • College Station, TX	**W** 4–1	36–5	2–0
Mar 29	Tulsa*	No. 7	OU Softball Complex • Norman, OK	**W** 4–1	37–5	
Mar 29	Tulsa*	No. 7	OU Softball Complex • Norman, OK	**W** 1–0	38–5	

April
Date	Opponent	Rank	Site/stadium	Score	Overall record	Big 12 Record
Apr 2	Iowa State	No. 7	OU Softball Complex • Norman, OK	**W** 9–0	39–5	3–0
Apr 2	Iowa State	No. 7	OU Softball Complex • Norman, OK	**W** 8–2	40–5	4–0
Apr 5	at No. 20 Oklahoma State	No. 6	Cowgirl Stadium • Stillwater, OK	**W** 4–2	41–5	5–0
Apr 8	at Texas	No. 6	Red and Charline McCombs Field • Austin, TX	**W** 5–1	42–5	6–0
Apr 9	at Texas	No. 6	Red and Charline McCombs Field • Austin, TX	**W** 9–5	43–5	7–0
Apr 12	at Missouri	No. 6	University Field • Columbia, MO	**W** 7–3	44–5	8–0
Apr 12	at Missouri	No. 6	University Field • Columbia, MO	**W** 2–1	45–5	9–0
Apr 14	Nebraska	No. 6	OU Softball Complex • Norman, OK	**L** 0–1^{11}	45–6	9–1
Apr 14	Nebraska	No. 6	OU Softball Complex • Norman, OK	**W** 13–0	46–6	10–1
Apr 15	Texas Tech	No. 6	OU Softball Complex • Norman, OK	**W** 5–0	47–6	11–1
Apr 16	Texas Tech	No. 6	OU Softball Complex • Norman, OK	**W** 7–1	48–6	12–1
Apr 19	No. 22 Oklahoma State	No. 6	OU Softball Complex • Norman, OK	**W** 10–5	49–6	13–1
Apr 21	at Baylor	No. 6	Getterman Stadium • Waco, TX	**W** 6–0	50–6	14–1
Apr 22	at Baylor	No. 6	Getterman Stadium • Waco, TX	**W** 8–1	51–6	15–1
Apr 25	Oklahoma City*	No. 6	OU Softball Complex • Norman, OK	**W** 6–0	52–6	
Apr 25	Oklahoma City*	No. 6	OU Softball Complex • Norman, OK	**W** 1–0	53–6	
Apr 29	Kansas	No. 5	OU Softball Complex • Norman, OK	**W** 11–3	54–6	16–1
Apr 30	Kansas	No. 5	OU Softball Complex • Norman, OK	**W** 6–2	55–6	17–1

Postseason

Big 12 tournament (3–2)
Date	Opponent	Rank	Site	Score	Win	Loss	Save	Attendance	Overall Record	B12T Record
May 11	vs. Missouri	No. 4	Hall of Fame Stadium; Oklahoma City, OK	8–3	**Moran** (23–1)	Falk (17–16)			56–6	1–0
May 11	vs. Texas A&M	No. 4	Hall of Fame Stadium	6–9	Lemuth (3–0)	**Stewart** (27–6)	Vining (1)		56–7	1–1
May 12	vs. Texas	No. 4	Hall of Fame Stadium	11–0					57–7	2–1
May 12	vs. No. 18 Nebraska	No. 4	Hall of Fame Stadium	4–3					58–7	3–1
May 13	vs. No. 18 Nebraska	No. 4	Hall of Fame Stadium	1–3					58–8	3–2

Norman Regional (4–0)
Date	Opponent	Rank	Site	Score	Win	Loss	Save	Attendance	Overall Record	Regional Record
May 18	vs. Harvard	No. 4	OU Softball Complex	11–0 ^{(5)}	**Moran** (25–2)	Guy (6–9)	—	850	59–8	1–0
May 19	vs. Cal State Northridge	No. 4	OU Softball Complex	2–1	**Stewart** (29–6)	Richardson (7–9)	—		60–8	2–0
May 20	vs. No. 13 Oregon State	No. 4	OU Softball Complex	5–3	**Stewart** (30–6)	Beyster (26–13)	—		61–8	3–0
May 21	vs. No. 13 Oregon State	No. 4	OU Softball Complex	3–2	**Moran** (26–2)		—	1,236	62–8	4–0

Women's College World Series (4–0)
Date	Opponent	Rank	Site	Score	Win	Loss	Save	Attendance	Overall Record	WCWS Record
May 24	vs. No. 10 California	No. 4	Hall of Fame Stadium	2–1	**Stewart** (31–6)	Forest (23–14)	—	6,856	63–8	1–0
May 25	vs. No. 8 Southern Miss	No. 4	Hall of Fame Stadium	3–1	**Stewart** (32–6)	Blades (51–7)	—	4,792	64–8	2–0
May 27	vs. No. 2 Arizona	No. 4	Hall of Fame Stadium	1–0	**Stewart** (33–6)	Lemke (30–7)	—	7,422	65–8	3–0
May 28	vs. No. 3 UCLA	No. 4	Hall of Fame Stadium	3–1	**Stewart** (34–6)	Freed (28–8)	—	8,049	66–8	4–0

- Win
- Loss
- Postponement
- Bold: Sooners team member
- Rankings from NFCA:
- (#) Tournament seedings in parentheses.

== Rankings ==
Ranking movements Legend: ██ Increase in ranking ██ Decrease in ranking
	Week													
Poll	Pre	1	2	3	4	5	6	7	8	9	10	11	12	Final
NFCA/USA Today	8	7	5	5	6	6	7	6	6	6	5	4	4	1
