= Loren LaPorte =

American softball coach

Current position
- Title: Head coach
- Team: James Madison
- Conference: Sun Belt
- Record: 197–74 (.727)

Biographical details
- Born: Callao, Virginia, U.S.
- Education: Roanoke College

Playing career
- 2005–2008: Roanoke
- Position: Shortstop

Coaching career (HC unless noted)
- 2009: Roanoke (asst.)
- 2010–2012: Radford (asst.)
- 2013–2017: James Madison (asst.)
- 2018–present: James Madison

Head coaching record
- Overall: 197–74 (.727)
- Tournaments: NCAA: 12–8 (.600)

Accomplishments and honors

Championships
- 2× CAA Regular Season Champions (2018, 2019, 2021); CAA Tournament Champions (2019, 2021)

Awards
- 3× CAA Coach of the Year (2018, 2019, 2021)

Loren LaPorte is an American softball coach who is the current head coach at James Madison.

== Playing career ==
LaPorte played shortstop for Roanoke where she helped her team to a 118–38 record in her four years as a player including two appearances in the NCAA Division III Tournament in 2005 and 2006. She finished her career ranked in the top 10 all-time in five statistical categories and was a three time 1st team All-ODAC honoree. She graduated in 2008 with a degree in biology and education.

== Coaching career ==
=== James Madison ===
On July 31, 2012, LaPorte was announced as an assistant coach of the James Madison softball program.

On September 14, 2017, Loren LaPorte was promoted to head coach of the James Madison softball program after the departure of Mickey Dean who left for Auburn.

== Head coaching record ==
=== College ===
Record table
Season	Team	Overall	Conference	Standing	Postseason
James Madison Dukes (Colonial Athletic Association) (2018–2022)
2018	James Madison	43–14	19–2	1st	NCAA Regional
2019	James Madison	51–10	20–1	1st	NCAA Super Regional
2020	James Madison	13–6			Season canceled due to the COVID-19
2021	James Madison	41–4	17–1	1st	Women's College World Series
2022	James Madison	21–21 (Note: James Madison canceled the remainder of the season after the passing of sophomore catcher Lauren Bernett on Monday, April 25.)	10–5	2nd	
James Madison Dukes (Sun Belt Conference) (2023–present)
2023	James Madison	28–19	13–11	6th	
2024	James Madison	31–22	12–12	T–6th	
2025	James Madison	11–13	0–3		
James Madison:		239–109 (.687)	91–35 (.722)		
Total:		239–96 (.713)			
National champion Postseason invitational champion Conference regular season champion Conference regular season and conference tournament champion Division regular season champion Division regular season and conference tournament champion Conference tournament champion
