= 2000 NCAA Division I softball season =

American college softball season

- Defending Champions: UCLA

Tournament

Women's College World Series
- Champions: Oklahoma (1st title)
- Runners-up: UCLA (17th WCWS Appearance)
- Winning Coach: Patty Gasso (1st title)
- WCWS MOP: Jennifer Stewart (Oklahoma)

Seasons
- ← 1999 2001 →

The 2000 NCAA Division I softball season, play of college softball in the United States organized by the National Collegiate Athletic Association (NCAA) at the Division I level, began in February 2000. The season progressed through the regular season, many conference tournaments and championship series, and concluded with the 2000 NCAA Division I softball tournament and 2000 Women's College World Series. The Women's College World Series, consisting of the eight remaining teams in the NCAA Tournament and held in Oklahoma City at ASA Hall of Fame Stadium, ended on May 29, 2000.

== Conference standings ==
2000 Big 12 Conference softball standings
	Conf.						Overall
Team	W		L		T	PCT	W		L		T	PCT
No. 1 Oklahoma ‍†‍‍^{y}	17	–	1	–	0	.944	66	–	8	–	0	.892
No. 14 Nebraska ‍‍‡‍^{y}	15	–	2	–	0	.882	52	–	21	–	0	.712
Texas ‍‍‍^{y}	11	–	5	–	0	.688	30	–	27	–	1	.526
Texas A&M ‍‍‍^{y}	8	–	10	–	0	.444	32	–	23	–	0	.582
Oklahoma State ‍‍‍	8	–	10	–	0	.444	33	–	22	–	0	.600
Texas Tech ‍‍‍	7	–	10	–	0	.412	19	–	36	–	0	.345
Baylor ‍‍‍	7	–	11	–	0	.389	27	–	30	–	0	.474
Missouri ‍‍‍	6	–	12	–	0	.333	34	–	27	–	0	.557
Kansas ‍‍‍	5	–	13	–	0	.278	30	–	32	–	0	.484
Iowa State ‍‍‍	4	–	14	–	0	.222	18	–	29	–	0	.383
† – Conference champion ‡ – Tournament champion y – Invited to the NCAA tournament Rankings from NFCA/USA Today

2000 Big Ten Conference softball standings
	Conf.						Overall
Team	W		L		T	PCT	W		L		T	PCT
No. 15 Iowa ‍†‍‍^{y}	14	–	4	–	0	.778	46	–	15	–	0	.754
No. 13 Michigan ‍‍‡‍^{y}	13	–	4	–	0	.765	45	–	16	–	1	.734
Penn State ‍‍‍^{y}	12	–	5	–	0	.706	38	–	19	–	0	.667
Northwestern ‍‍‍^{y}	12	–	6	–	0	.667	30	–	26	–	0	.536
Wisconsin ‍‍‍	9	–	6	–	0	.600	34	–	25	–	0	.576
Purdue ‍‍‍	6	–	10	–	0	.375	34	–	24	–	1	.585
Michigan State ‍‍‍	5	–	10	–	0	.333	30	–	23	–	0	.566
Indiana ‍‍‍	5	–	13	–	0	.278	33	–	28	–	0	.541
Minnesota ‍‍‍	4	–	13	–	0	.235	31	–	28	–	0	.525
Ohio State ‍‍‍	4	–	13	–	0	.235	28	–	26	–	0	.519
† – Conference champion ‡ – Tournament champion y – Invited to the NCAA tournament As of June 2000; Rankings from NFCA/USA Today

2000 Pacific-10 Conference softball standings
	Conf.						Overall
Team	W		L		T	PCT	W		L		T	PCT
No. 5 Washington ‍†‍‍^{y}	17	–	4	–	0	.810	62	–	9	–	0	.873
No. 3 Arizona ‍‍‍^{y}	16	–	4	–	0	.800	59	–	9	–	0	.868
No. 2 UCLA ‍‍‍^{y}	14	–	7	–	0	.667	46	–	12	–	1	.788
No. 18 Stanford ‍‍‍^{y}	9	–	12	–	0	.429	45	–	18	–	0	.714
No. 10 Arizona State ‍‍‍^{y}	8	–	13	–	0	.381	43	–	20	–	0	.683
No. 12 Oregon State ‍‍‍^{y}	7	–	13	–	0	.350	40	–	21	–	1	.653
No. 7 California ‍‍‍^{y}	6	–	15	–	0	.286	49	–	25	–	0	.662
No. 16 Oregon ‍‍‍^{y}	6	–	15	–	0	.286	36	–	29	–	0	.554
† – Conference champion y – Invited to the NCAA tournament As of June 30, 2000; Rankings from NFCA/USA Today

2000 Southland Conference softball standings
	Conf.						Overall
Team	W		L		T	PCT	W		L		T	PCT
Northwestern State ‍†‍‍^{y}	22	–	4	–	0	.846	41	–	19	–	0	.683
Texas–San Antonio ‍‍‍	22	–	5	–	0	.815	39	–	21	–	1	.648
Louisiana–Monroe ‍‍‍	17	–	9	–	0	.654	28	–	27	–	0	.509
Southwest Texas State ‍‍‍	16	–	11	–	0	.593	35	–	24	–	0	.593
McNeese State ‍‍‍	16	–	11	–	0	.593	27	–	33	–	0	.450
Texas–Arlington ‍‍‍	13	–	14	–	0	.481	22	–	33	–	0	.400
Stephen F. Austin ‍‍‍	12	–	13	–	0	.480	26	–	22	–	0	.542
Southeastern Louisiana ‍‍‍	6	–	20	–	0	.231	21	–	32	–	0	.396
Sam Houston State ‍‍‍	4	–	22	–	0	.154	18	–	34	–	0	.346
Nicholls State ‍‍‍	4	–	23	–	0	.148	14	–	47	–	0	.230
† – Conference champion y – Invited to the NCAA tournament As of May 20, 2000; Rankings from NFCA/USA Today

== Women's College World Series ==
The 2000 NCAA Women's College World Series took place from May 25 to May 29, 2000, in Oklahoma City.

Round of 16
Washington	3
DePaul	2
UCLA	4
Alabama	1
DePaul	4
Alabama	6
Oklahoma	2
California	1
Southern Miss	1
Arizona	0
California	0
Arizona	6

Quarterfinals
Washington	2
UCLA	3
Southern Miss	3
Alabama	0
Oklahoma	3
Southern Miss	1
Washington	2
Arizona	4

Semifinals
UCLA	6	—
Southern Miss	0	—
Oklahoma	1	—
Arizona	0	—

Finals
UCLA	1
Oklahoma	3

== Season leaders ==
Batting

- Batting average: .474 – Jessica Mendoza, Stanford Cardinal
- RBIs: 90 – Jenny Topping, Washington Huskies
- Home runs: 24 – Jenny Topping, Washington Huskies

Pitching

- Wins: 52-7 – Courtney Blades, Southern Miss Golden Eagles
- ERA: 0.40 (16 ER/276.0 IP) – Amanda Scott, Fresno State Bulldogs
- Strikeouts: 663 – Courtney Blades, Southern Miss Golden Eagles

== Records ==
NCAA Division I season wins: 52 – Courtney Blades, Southern Miss Golden Eagles

NCAA Division I season hit by pitch: 44 – Cheryl Wyrick, Liberty Lady Flames

NCAA Division I season putouts: 765 – Kenya Peters, Southern Miss Golden Eagles

Freshman class walks: 87 – Veronica Nelson, California Golden Bears

== Awards ==
- Honda Sports Award Softball:

Courtney Blades, Southern Miss Golden Eagles

YEAR	W	L	GP	GS	CG	SHO	SV	IP	H	R	ER	BB	SO	ERA	WHIP
2000	52	7	66	60	46	28	2	399.2	152	61	51	117	663	0.89	0.67

== All America Teams ==
The following players were members of the All-American Teams.

First Team

Position	Player	Class	School
P	Courtney Blades	SR.	Southern Miss Golden Eagles
P	Amanda Scott	SR.	Fresno State Bulldogs
P	Jennifer Spediacci	SR.	Washington Huskies
C	Keri McCallum	SR.	Mississippi State Bulldogs
1B	Ginger Jones	JR.	Alabama Crimson Tide
2B	Stephanie Hastings	JR.	LSU Tigers
3B	Ashlee Ducote	SR.	LSU Tigers
SS	Natasha Watley	FR.	UCLA Bruins
OF	Jessica Mendoza	SO.	Stanford Cardinal
OF	Tiffany Clark	SR.	ULL Rajin' Cajuns
OF	Kelly Kretschman	JR.	Alabama Crimson Tide
DP	Lisa Carey	JR.	Oklahoma Sooners
UT	Jenny Topping	FR.	Washington Huskies
AT-L	Ashli Barrett	JR.	Oklahoma Sooners
AT-L	Tarrah Beyster	SR.	Oregon State Beavers
AT-L	Jennie Finch	SO.	Arizona Wildcats
AT-L	Jamie Graves	SR.	Washington Huskies
AT-L	Kellie Wilkerson	SO.	Mississippi State Bulldogs

Second Team

Position	Player	Class	School
P	Jennifer Sharron	JR.	Notre Dame Fighting Irish
P	Britni Sneed	SO.	LSU Tigers
P	Kirsten Voak	SO.	Arizona State Sun Devils
C	Sunny Smith	SR.	Utah Utes
1B	Sarah Beeson	SO.	Stanford Cardinal
2B	Lyndsey Klein	SR.	UCLA Bruins
3B	Toni Mascarenas	JR.	Arizona Wildcats
SS	Melanie Alkrie	JR.	Notre Dame Fighting Irish
OF	Serita Brooks	JR.	FSU Seminoles
OF	Jaime Clark	FR.	Washington Huskies
OF	Nicole Giordano	JR.	Arizona Wildcats
DP	Dana Degen	SR.	Hawaii Rainbow Wahine
UT	Jennifer Lizama	SR.	Nebraska Cornhuskers
AT-L	Lauren Bauer	JR.	Arizona Wildcats
AT-L	Lindsay Gardner	FR.	Texas Longhorns
AT-L	Alicia Smith	SR.	Hofstra Pride
AT-L	Dana Sorensen	FR.	Stanford Cardinal
AT-L	Leigh Ann Walker	SO.	Nebraska Cornhuskers

Third Team

Position	Player	Class	School
P	Holly Killion	SR.	Western Illinois Leathernecks
P	Shelley Laird	SO.	South Carolina Gamecocks
P	Jennifer Stewart	SO.	Oklahoma Sooners
C	Jessica Bashor	FR.	Iowa Hawkeyes
1B	Brandi Cross	FR.	UMass Minutewomen
1B	Monica Lucatero	SO.	Cal State Fullerton Titans
1B	Jana Mower	JR.	ULL Rajin' Cajuns
2B	Keisha Shepperson	JR.	East Carolina Pirates
3B	Kelly Ramsey	SO.	North Carolina Tar Heels
SS	Racheal Goodpaster	JR.	UNLV Rebels
OF	Lisa Ciavardini	JR.	Hofstra Pride
OF	Naomi Fitzgerald	JR.	Baylor Bears
OF	Karen Gulini	JR.	Penn State Nittany Lions
DP	Stefanie Volpe	SO.	Michigan Wolverines
UT	Lindsay Chouinard	SR.	DePaul Blue Demons
AT-L	Amy Berman	SR.	Southern Miss Golden Eagles
AT-L	Marissa Young	FR.	Michigan Wolverines
AT-L	Lovieanne Jung	SO.	Fresno State Bulldogs
AT-L	Lindsey Collins	JR.	Arizona Wildcats
AT-L	Erin Evans	FR.	Oklahoma Sooners
AT-L	Tara Asbill	SR.	LSU Tigers
AT-L	Kristi Hanks	SO.	Iowa Hawkeyes
