= 2015 Hofstra Pride softball team =

American college softball season

2015 Hofstra Pride softball

2015 CAA Champions
- Conference: Colonial Athletic Association
- Record: 37–12–1 (17–3 CAA)
- Head coach: Larissa Anderson
- Assistant coach: Julie Meyer, Caitlin Dent, Brittany Garvey
- Home stadium: Hofstra Softball Stadium / Bill Edwards Stadium

2015 Colonial Athletic Association softball standings
	Conf.						Overall
Team	W		L		T	PCT	W		L		T	PCT
#17 James Madison†^{y} ‍‍‍	19	–	0	–	0	1.000	48	–	10	–	0	.828
Hofstra ‍‍‡‍^{y}	17	–	3	–	0	.850	38	–	14	–	1	.726
Elon ‍‍‍	11	–	10	–	0	.524	31	–	22	–	0	.585
Towson ‍‍‍	10	–	11	–	0	.476	35	–	22	–	0	.614
College of Charleston ‍‍‍	7	–	14	–	0	.333	24	–	29	–	0	.453
Drexel ‍‍‍	6	–	13	–	0	.316	19	–	23	–	0	.452
Delaware ‍‍‍	6	–	14	–	0	.300	30	–	23	–	0	.566
UNC Wilmington ‍‍‍	5	–	16	–	0	.238	19	–	27	–	0	.413
† – Conference champion ‡ – Tournament champion As of May 24, 2015; Rankings from USA Today/NFCA Coaches

The 2015 Hofstra Pride softball team represented Hofstra University in the 2015 NCAA Division I softball season. The Pride competed in the Colonial Athletic Association and were led by first-year head coach Larissa Anderson. Hofstra played its home games at the Hofstra Softball Stadium in Hempstead, New York. Head coach and NFCA Hall of Fame member Bill Edwards retired after the 2014 season, and chose associate head coach Larissa Anderson to be his successor. On April 19, 2015, the stadium was renamed in his honor.

== Roster ==
2015 Hofstra roster
Pitchers: 8 Morgan Lashley – Senior; 11 Nikki Michalowski – Freshman; 20 Taylor Pirone – Senior; 28 Jessica Peslak – Sophomore	Catchers: 32 Erin Trippi – Senior; Infielders: 3 Kim Smith – Junior; 5 Lacey Clark – Sophomore; 17 Michaela Transue – Sophomore; 18 Christie Sinacori – Sophomore; 21 Brittany Allocca – Freshman; 22 Isabel Hansbury – Freshman; 36 Megan Patierno – Freshman	Outfielders: 6 Rachel Simodejka – Redshirt freshman; 10 Chloe Fitzgerald – Junior; 12 Alyssa Cuzzola – Junior; 14 Brielle Pietrafesa – Freshman; 24 Caryn Bailey – Junior; Utility players: 7 Danielle Bitts – Redshirt junior

== Schedule ==
2015 Hofstra Pride Softball Game Log
Regular season
February

#	Date	Opponent	Site/stadium	Score	Overall record	CAA record
1	February 13	Central Arkansas	Tiger Park (LSU)	2–3	0–1	–
2	February 13	Louisiana State	Tiger Park (LSU)	0–3	0–2	–
3	February 14	Central Arkansas	Tiger Park (LSU)	8–0	1–2	–
4	February 14	Louisiana State	Tiger Park (LSU)	0–8	1–3	–
5	February 15	Notre Dame	Tiger Park (LSU)	3–2	2–3	–
6	February 20	Iowa	Lafayette, LA	4–3	3–3	–
7	February 20	ULL	Lafayette, LA	0–3	3–4	–
8	February 21	Iowa	Lafayette, LA	9–3	4–4	–
9	February 21	ULL	Lafayette, LA	0–9	4–5	–
10	February 22	McNeese St.	Lafayette, LA	3–2	5–5	–

March

#	Date	Opponent	Site/stadium	Score	Overall record	CAA record
11	March 6	BCU	Boca Raton, FL	6–1	6–5	–
12	March 6	FAU	Boca Raton, FL	2–3	6–6	–
13	March 7	CCU	Boca Raton, FL	2–0	7–6	–
14	March 7	FSU	Boca Raton, FL	1–2	7–7	–
15	March 8	FAU	Boca Raton, FL	5–5	7–7–1	–
16	March 18	Dartmouth	Bronx, NY	1–0	8–7–1	–
17	March 21	UNCW	Wilmington, NC	8–0	9–7–1	1–0
18	March 21	UNCW	Wilmington, NC	3–0	10–7–1	2–0
19	March 22	UNCW	Wilmington, NC	6–0	11–7–1	3–0
20	March 24	Northwestern	Hofstra Softball Stadium	6–5	12–7–1	3–0
21	March 25	Rutgers	Hofstra Softball Stadium	CLD	–	–
22	March 25	Rutgers	Hofstra Softball Stadium	CLD	–	–
23	March 28	Towson	Hofstra Softball Stadium	7–3	13–7–1	4–0
24	March 28	Towson	Hofstra Softball Stadium	14–6	14–7–1	5–0
25	March 29	Towson	Hofstra Softball Stadium	6–4	15–7–1	6–0

April

#	Date	Opponent	Site/stadium	Score	Overall record	CAA record
26	April 1	Iona	Hofstra Softball Stadium	15–0	16–7–1	6–0
27	April 1	Iona	Hofstra Softball Stadium	16–1	17–7–1	6–0
28	April 4	JMU	Hofstra Softball Stadium	2–4	17–8–1	6–1
29	April 4	JMU	Hofstra Softball Stadium	4–7	17–9–1	6–2
30	April 4	JMU	Hofstra Softball Stadium	CLD	–	–
31	April 8	Lehigh	Bethlehem, PA	5–4	18–9–1	6–2
32	April 8	Lehigh	Bethlehem, PA	4–0	19–9–1	6–2
33	April 11	Drexel	Philadelphia, PA	4–3	20–9–1	7–2
34	April 11	Drexel	Philadelphia, PA	11–1	21–9–1	8–2
35	April 12	Drexel	Philadelphia, PA	10–1	22–9–1	9–2
36	April 15	LIU Brooklyn	Hofstra Softball Stadium	8–0	23–9–1	9–2
37	April 16	Stony Brook	Hofstra Softball Stadium	0–4	23–10–1	9–2
38	April 18	Elon	Hofstra Softball Stadium	4–1	24–10–1	10–2
39	April 18	Elon	Hofstra Softball Stadium	4–0	25–10–1	11–2
40	April 19	Elon	Bill Edwards Stadium	2–5	25–11–1	11–3
41	April 21	Syracuse	Bill Edwards Stadium	6–4	26–11–1	11–3
42	April 21	Syracuse	Bill Edwards Stadium	CLD	–	–
43	April 22	Fordham	Stadium	7–1	27–11–1	11–3
44	April 25	Delaware	Bill Edwards Stadium	8–0	28–11–1	12–3
45	April 25	Delaware	Bill Edwards Stadium	8–0	29–11–1	13–3
46	April 26	Delaware	Bill Edwards Stadium	3–0	30–11–1	14–3
47	April 28	Seton Hall	South Orange, NJ	6–3	31–11–1	14–3

May

#	Date	Opponent	Site/stadium	Score	Overall record	CAA record
48	May 1	Charleston	Charleston, SC	12–2	32–11–1	15–3
49	May 1	Charleston	Charleston, SC	8–0	33–11–1	16–3
50	May 2	Charleston	Charleston, SC	11–5	34–11–1	17–3

Colonial Athletic Association Tournament

#	Date	Opponent	Site/stadium	Score	Overall record	Tournament record
51	May 6	Elon	Harrisonburg, VA	10–0	35–11–1	17–3
52	May 7	James Madison	Harrisonburg, VA	5–3	36–11–1	17–3
53	May 8	James Madison	Harrisonburg, VA	3–4	36–12–1	17–3
54	May 8	James Madison	Harrisonburg, VA	2–1	37–12–1	17–3
