= 2000 Big 12 Conference softball tournament =

Collegiate softball tournament

- Teams: 10
- Finals site: ASA Hall of Fame Stadium; Oklahoma City, OK
- Champions: Nebraska (2nd title)
- Runner-up: Texas A&M (1st title game)
- Winning coach: Rhonda Revelle (2nd title)
- MVP: Jennifer Lizama (Nebraska)
- Attendance: 4,500

2000 Big 12 Conference softball standings
	Conf.						Overall
Team	W		L		T	PCT	W		L		T	PCT
No. 1 Oklahoma ‍†‍‍^{y}	17	–	1	–	0	.944	66	–	8	–	0	.892
No. 14 Nebraska ‍‍‡‍^{y}	15	–	2	–	0	.882	52	–	21	–	0	.712
Texas ‍‍‍^{y}	11	–	5	–	0	.688	30	–	27	–	1	.526
Texas A&M ‍‍‍^{y}	8	–	10	–	0	.444	32	–	23	–	0	.582
Oklahoma State ‍‍‍	8	–	10	–	0	.444	33	–	22	–	0	.600
Texas Tech ‍‍‍	7	–	10	–	0	.412	19	–	36	–	0	.345
Baylor ‍‍‍	7	–	11	–	0	.389	27	–	30	–	0	.474
Missouri ‍‍‍	6	–	12	–	0	.333	34	–	27	–	0	.557
Kansas ‍‍‍	5	–	13	–	0	.278	30	–	32	–	0	.484
Iowa State ‍‍‍	4	–	14	–	0	.222	18	–	29	–	0	.383
† – Conference champion ‡ – Tournament champion y – Invited to the NCAA tournament Rankings from NFCA/USA Today

The 2000 Big 12 Conference softball tournament was held at ASA Hall of Fame Stadium in Oklahoma City, OK from May 10 through May 13, 2000. Nebraska won their second conference tournament and earned the Big 12 Conference's automatic bid to the 2000 NCAA Division I softball tournament.

Oklahoma, Nebraska, Texas and Texas A&M received bids to the NCAA tournament. Oklahoma would go on to play in the 2000 Women's College World Series.

Oklahoma went on to win the 2000 National Championship.

== Standings ==
Place	Seed	Team	Conference				Overall			
Place	Seed	Team	W	L	T	%	W	L	T	%
1	1	Oklahoma	17	1	0	.944	66	8	0	.892
2	2	Nebraska	15	2	0	.882	52	21	0	.712
3	3	Texas	11	5	0	.688	30	27	1	.526
4	4	Texas A&M	8	10	0	.444	32	23	0	.582
4	5	Oklahoma State	8	10	0	.444	33	22	0	.600
6	6	Texas Tech	7	10	0	.412	19	36	0	.345
7	7	Baylor	7	11	0	.389	27	30	0	.474
8	8	Missouri	6	12	0	.333	34	27	0	.557
9	9	Kansas	5	13	0	.278	30	32	0	.484
10	10	Iowa State	4	14	0	.222	18	29	0	.383

== Bracket and results ==
=== Bracket ===
==== Opening round ====
Team	R
9 Kansas	1
8 Missouri	5

Team	R
10 Iowa State	6
7 Baylor	3

==== Double-elimination rounds ====
First round
1	Oklahoma	8
8	Missouri	3
4	Texas A&M	3^{9}
5	Oklahoma State	2
8	Missouri	4
5	Oklahoma State	2
3	Texas Tech	8
6	Texas	4
2	Nebraska	5
10	Iowa State	1
6	Texas	4
10	Iowa State	3

Second round
1	Oklahoma	6
4	Texas A&M	9
3	Texas Tech	0
8	Missouri	1
3	Texas Tech	1
2	Nebraska	4
1	Oklahoma	11^{5}
6	Texas	0

Semifinals
4	Texas A&M	6	—
8	Missouri	5	—
2	Nebraska	3	3
1	Oklahoma	4	1

Finals
4	Texas A&M	1
2	Nebraska	2

=== Game results ===
Game	Time	Matchup	Location	Attendance
Day 1 – Wednesday, May 10
1	5:07 p.m.	#8 Missouri 5, #9 Kansas 1	Hall of Fame Stadium	469
2	7:30 p.m.	#10 Iowa State 6, #7 Baylor 3	Hall of Fame Stadium	469
Day 2 – Thursday, May 11
3	10:07 a.m.	#1 Oklahoma 8, #8 Missouri 3	Hall of Fame Stadium	750
4	10:07 a.m.	#4 Texas A&M 3, #5 Oklahoma State 2 (9)	Field 2	750
5	12:57 p.m.	#2 Nebraska 5, #10 Iowa State 1	Hall of Fame Stadium	750
6	12:55 p.m.	#6 Texas Tech 8, #3 Texas 4	Field 2	750
7	3:55 p.m.	#8 Missouri 4, #5 Oklahoma State 2	Hall of Fame Stadium	750
8	4:05 p.m.	#3 Texas 4, #10 Iowa State 3	Field 2	750
9	6:35 p.m.	#4 Texas A&M 9, #1 Oklahoma 6	Hall of Fame Stadium	750
10	9:10 p.m.	#2 Nebraska 4, #6 Texas Tech 1	Hall of Fame Stadium	750
Day 3 – Friday, May 12
11	10:04 a.m.	#1 Oklahoma 11, #3 Texas 0 (5)	Hall of Fame Stadium	469
12	12:30 p.m.	#8 Missouri 1, #6 Texas Tech 0	Hall of Fame Stadium	369
13	5:37 p.m.	#1 Oklahoma 4, #2 Nebraska 3	Hall of Fame Stadium	925
14	8:08 p.m.	#4 Texas A&M 6, #8 Missouri 5	Hall of Fame Stadium	925
Day 4 – Saturday, May 13
15	11:32 a.m.	#2 Nebraska 3, #1 Oklahoma 1	Hall of Fame Stadium	1,067
16	3:06 p.m.	#2 Nebraska 2, #4 Texas A&M 1	Hall of Fame Stadium	1,067
Game times in CDT. Rankings denote tournament seed.

== All-Tournament Team ==
Position	Player	School
MOP	Jennifer Lizama	Nebraska
1B/SS	Lisa Carey	Oklahoma
2B	Dara Throneburg	Missouri
2B/SS	Lindsay Gardner	Texas
3B	Mandy Fulton	Oklahoma
IF	Jennifer Lizama	Nebraska
C	Selena Collins	Texas A&M
OF	Stacy Gemeinhardt	Missouri
OF	Kim Ogee	Nebraska
OF/C	Andrea Davis	Oklahoma
OF	Angie Shetler	Texas A&M
P/DP	Jenny Voss	Nebraska
P	Lana Moran	Oklahoma
