= 2016 Hofstra Pride softball team =

College softball season

2016 Hofstra Pride softball
- Conference: Colonial Athletic Association
- Head coach: Larissa Anderson
- Assistant coach: Julie Meyer, Elise Fortier
- Home stadium: Bill Edwards Stadium

2016 Colonial Athletic Association softball standings
	Conf.						Overall
Team	W		L		T	PCT	W		L		T	PCT
#8 James Madison ‍†‍‡‍^{y}	18	–	1	–	0	.947	50	–	6	–	0	.893
Towson ‍‍‍	11	–	8	–	0	.579	37	–	17	–	0	.685
College of Charleston ‍‍‍	11	–	9	–	0	.550	35	–	23	–	0	.603
Elon ‍‍‍	9	–	8	–	0	.529	26	–	25	–	0	.510
Delaware ‍‍‍	9	–	9	–	0	.500	30	–	21	–	0	.588
UNC Wilmington ‍‍‍	8	–	10	–	0	.444	29	–	21	–	0	.580
Hofstra ‍‍‍	8	–	10	–	0	.444	24	–	22	–	0	.522
Drexel ‍‍‍	0	–	19	–	0	.000	20	–	35	–	0	.364
† – Conference champion ‡ – Tournament champion As of May 24, 2016; Rankings from USA Today/NFCA Coaches

The 2016 Hofstra Pride softball team represents Hofstra University in the 2016 NCAA Division I softball season. The Pride compete in the Colonial Athletic Association and are led by second-year head coach Larissa Anderson. Hofstra plays its home games at Bill Edwards Stadium in Hempstead, New York. Hofstra won the 2015 CAA Softball championship.

== Roster ==
2016 Hofstra Roster
Pitchers: 4 Madison Grimm – Freshman; 11 Nikki Michalowski – Sophomore; 28 Jessica Peslak – Junior	Catchers: 15 Madison Ambush – Freshman; 18 Christie Sinacori – Junior; 21 Brittany Allocca – Sophomore; Infielders: 3 Kim Smith – "Senior"; 5 Lacey Clark – Junior; 16 Courtney Scarpato – Freshman; 17 Michaela Transue – Sophomore; 20 Gabby Bram – Freshman; 22 Isabel Hansbury – Sophomore; 36 Megan Patierno – Sophomore	Outfielders: 10 Chloe Fitzgerald – Senior; 12 Alyssa Cuzzola – Senior; 14 Brielle Pietrafesa – Sophomore; 24 Caryn Bailey – Senior; 25 Jessica Choate – Freshman
