= 2015 Colonial Athletic Association softball tournament =

2015 Colonial Athletic Association softball standings
	Conf.						Overall
Team	W		L		T	PCT	W		L		T	PCT
#17 James Madison†^{y} ‍‍‍	19	–	0	–	0	1.000	48	–	10	–	0	.828
Hofstra ‍‍‡‍^{y}	17	–	3	–	0	.850	38	–	14	–	1	.726
Elon ‍‍‍	11	–	10	–	0	.524	31	–	22	–	0	.585
Towson ‍‍‍	10	–	11	–	0	.476	35	–	22	–	0	.614
College of Charleston ‍‍‍	7	–	14	–	0	.333	24	–	29	–	0	.453
Drexel ‍‍‍	6	–	13	–	0	.316	19	–	23	–	0	.452
Delaware ‍‍‍	6	–	14	–	0	.300	30	–	23	–	0	.566
UNC Wilmington ‍‍‍	5	–	16	–	0	.238	19	–	27	–	0	.413
† – Conference champion ‡ – Tournament champion As of May 24, 2015; Rankings from USA Today/NFCA Coaches

The 2015 Colonial Athletic Association (CAA) softball tournament was held at Veterans Memorial Park on the campus of James Madison University in Harrisonburg, Virginia from May 6 through May 8, 2015. Hofstra won the tournament, beating the top seeded James Madison Dukes and earning the CAA's automatic bid to the 2015 NCAA Division I softball tournament. The entire tournament was aired on CAA.TV with the championship being broadcast on TV on American Sports Network.

== Tournament ==
1st Round
1	James Madison	3
4	Towson	2
2	Hofstra	10
3	Elon	0^{(5)}
Lower round 1
3	Elon	8
4	Towson	6

Semifinals
1	James Madison	3
2	Hofstra	5
Lower final
1	James Madison	13
3	Elon	2^{(5)}

Championship
2	Hofstra	2	2
1	James Madison	3	1

- All times listed are Eastern Daylight Time.
