= Megan Good =

Softball player

USSSA Pride – No. 13
- Pitcher
- Born: October 13, 1995 (age 29)

Teams
- James Madison (2015–2019); USSSA Pride (2019–present)

Megan Good (born October 13, 1995) is an American, former collegiate 4-time All-American, right-handed hitting softball pitcher, originally from Mount Sidney, Virginia. She attended Fort Defiance High School in Fort Defiance, Virginia. She later attended James Madison University, where she pitched for the James Madison Dukes softball team. She would go on to be named a 4-time First Team All-Colonial Athletic Association conference, Rookie of The Year, 4-time Pitcher of The Year and also Player of The Year in 2017. She is the career Triple Crown pitching leader for the Dukes as well as the ERA record holder for the CAA conference. She played for the USSSA Pride after being drafted to the NPF 10th overall. She would go on to win the Cowles Cup Championship with the team in her rookie year.

== James Madison Dukes ==
Good started her freshman campaign being named a CAA First-Team selectee, Rookie of The Year and National Fastpitch Coaches Association Second Team All-American. She would set a career high in doubles and threw two no-hitters. Good debuted on February 14, she fanned 14 Maine Black Bears to set a career best in strikeouts for a regulation game. She would also start one of two career streaks on both sides of the plate beginning with this win, she proceeded to win 26 more straight games before losing to the Hofstra Pride on May 7. For that streak, Good allowed 90 hits, 23 earned runs, 27 walks and struck out 149 in 152.2 innings pitched for a 1.05 ERA and 0.77 WHIP. Then on February 27 she began a 12-game hit streak, hitting .488 (20/41) and tallying 11 RBIs, two home runs, striking out just once. In a game on March 13 vs. the UIC Flames, Good also had a career best 4 hits at the plate. On April 26, Good no-hit the Elon Phoenix.

As a sophomore, Good captured another First Team All-CAA, CAA Pitcher of The Year and her first First-Team NFCA All-American honors. Good earned a conference pitching Triple Crown for leading in wins, ERA and strikeouts that year. She would throw a perfect game on April 17 against the Drexel Dragons. Later on May 13, she would walk three times in winning the CAA championship over the Towson Tigers for a career high.

Good repeated exact honors from her previous year but added a Player of The Year award, a first for the CAA conference to have a dual winner to accompany a second pitching Triple Crown. She was the recipient of the 2017 NFCA National Player of the Year and also was named a finalist for the USA Softball Collegiate Player of the Year award. The Dukes set career bests in wins, strikeouts, shutouts, ERA, WHIP, strikeout ratio (7.7), batting average, hits and RBIs, also firing a no-hitter. She would also set the school season pitching Triple Crown records. Beginning on February 17, she would end a win over the Oklahoma State Cowgirls with 3.2 shutout innings and continue to not allow a run until the third inning of a win against the East Carolina Pirates on March 11. Good surrendered 20 hits, 10 walks and struck out 99 batters in 70.1 innings for a 0.43 WHIP during one of the best shutout streaks in NCAA history.

After taking 2018 to recovery from a leg injury, Good returned in 2019 and achieved her fourth First Team All-CAA and third Pitcher of The Year. She also had her fourth NFCA recognition, this time to the Third Team. The senior set personal bests in home runs, slugging percentage and walks. Good opened the season throwing a victory against the Oregon Ducks for her 100th win. On March 23, Good belted two home runs to drive in 7 RBIs in a run-rule over the Elon Phoenix. Tossing a 9-inning shutout, Good set a new school record with 17 strikeouts against the Towson Tigers on March 31. The Dukes made their fourth straight NCAA tournament appearance, losing to the eventual champions the UCLA Bruins with Good pitching for three innings and collecting two hits in her final collegiate game.

Good would end her career leading James Madison in wins, strikeouts, ERA and WHIP. She owns the CAA record for ERA, including the national 2019 class ERA crown.

== Statistics ==
=== James Madison Dukes ===
Year	W	L	GP	GS	CG	Sh	SV	IP	H	R	ER	BB	SO	ERA	WHIP
2015	29	3	38	30	21	6	2	193.1	114	41	29	34	199	1.05	0.76
2016	32	3	41	32	20	10	1	215.2	114	40	29	43	222	0.94	0.73
2017	38	3	44	39	22	14	1	244.2	125	33	22	35	271	0.63	0.65
2019	21	8	34	27	22	7	2	190.0	118	63	44	71	208	1.62	0.99
TOTALS	120	17	157	128	85	37	6	843.2	471	177	124	183	900	1.03	0.77

Year	G	AB	R	H	BA	RBI	HR	3B	2B	TB	SLG	BB	SO	SB	SBA
2015	58	183	29	68	.371	43	10	1	11	111	.606%	14	22	2	6
2016	56	176	27	54	.307	29	7	2	9	88	.500%	25	25	3	3
2017	60	180	34	69	.383	58	12	0	11	116	.644%	28	12	0	0
2019	61	168	47	57	.339	58	16	1	11	118	.702%	47	40	0	0
TOTALS	235	707	137	248	.351	188	45	4	42	433	.612%	114	99	5	9
