= 2000 NCAA Division I softball tournament =

College softball tournament

- Teams: 48
- Finals site: ASA Hall of Fame Stadium; Oklahoma City
- Champions: Oklahoma (1st title)
- Runner-up: UCLA (17th WCWS Appearance)
- Winning coach: Patty Gasso (1st title)
- MOP: Jennifer Stewart (Oklahoma)

The 2000 NCAA Division I softball tournament was held 18 through May 29, 2000, as the final part of the 2000 NCAA Division I softball season. The tournament culminated with the 2000 Women's College World Series at USA Softball Hall of Fame Stadium in Oklahoma City.

== Format ==
A total of 48 teams entered the tournament, with 32 of them receiving an automatic bid by either winning their conference's tournament or by finishing in first place in their conference. The remaining 32 bids were issued at-large, with selections extended by the NCAA Selection Committee.

== Bids ==
=== Automatic ===
Conference	School	Best finish	Last NCAA appearance
Big 12	Nebraska	Runners-up (1985)	1999
Big Ten	Michigan		1999

== Regionals ==
=== Regional No. 1 ===
First round
1	Washington	5
6	Army	0
2	Mississippi State	6
5	Chattanooga	1
3	Utah	1^{8}
4	Western Illinois	0

Second round
Washington	6
Western Illinois	0
Mississippi State	11^{6}
Utah	3
Army	4
Chattanooga	6^{9}

Third round
Washington	4
Mississippi State	1
Utah	2
Chattanooga	1

Semifinals
Mississippi State	1
Utah	4

Final
Washington	9^{5}	—
Utah	0	—

Washington qualifies for WCWS.

=== Regional No. 2 ===
First round
1	Arizona	8^{6}
6	Middle Tennessee	0
2	Nebraska	8^{5}
5	Illinois State	0
3	South Carolina	10^{6}
4	UMass	0

Second round
Arizona	10^{6}
UMass	0
Nebraska	11^{6}
South Carolina	1
Middle Tennessee	1
Illinois State	3

Third round
Arizona	13^{5}
Nebraska	0
South Carolina	7
Illinois State	4

Semifinals
Nebraska	9^{5}
South Carolina	0

Final
Arizona	5	—
Nebraska	0	—

Arizona qualifies for WCWS.

=== Regional No. 3 ===
First round
1	Oklahoma	11^{5}
6	Harvard	0
2	Oregon State	1^{10}
5	Northwestern	0
3	Arkansas	5
4	Cal State Northridge	0

Second round
Oklahoma	2
Cal State Northridge	1
Oregon State	4
Arkansas	1
Harvard	6
Northwestern	9

Third round
Oklahoma	5
Oregon State	3
Arkansas	0
Northwestern	5

Semifinals
Oregon State	4
Northwestern	0

Final
Oklahoma	3	—
Oregon State	2	—

Oklahoma qualifies for WCWS.

=== Regional No. 4 ===
First round
1	UCLA	8^{5}
6	Canisius	0
2	Iowa	9^{5}
5	Bethune-Cookman	1
3	Florida State	2
4	Long Beach State	0

Second round
UCLA	10
Long Beach State	1
Iowa	1
Florida State	4
Canisius	3^{10}
Bethune-Cookman	2

Third round
UCLA	6
Florida State	1
Iowa	2^{9}
Canisius	1

Semifinals
Florida State	4
Iowa	2

Final
UCLA	7	—
Florida State	1	—

UCLA qualifies for WCWS.

=== Regional No. 5 ===
First round
1	Arizona State	9^{6}
6	Coastal Carolina	1
2	Alabama	1^{9}
5	Florida Atlantic	0
3	Penn State	3
4	Texas A&M	2

Second round
Arizona State	4
Texas A&M	2
Alabama	5^{9}
Penn State	4
Coastal Carolina	4
Florida Atlantic	2

Third round
Arizona State	1
Alabama	4
Penn State	1
Coastal Carolina	3

Semifinals
Arizona State	2
Coastal Carolina	1

Final
Alabama	3	—
Arizona State	1	—

Alabama qualifies for WCWS.

=== Regional No. 6 ===
First round
1	Fresno State	10^{5}
6	UMBC	1
2	Cal State Fullerton	2
5	Texas	1
3	California	2
4	Florida	0

Second round
Fresno State	0
Florida	1
UMBC	0
Texas	6
Cal State Fullerton	2
California	3
Fresno State	4
Cal State Fullerton	3

Third round
Florida	5^{8}
Texas	2
California	0
Fresno State	2

Semifinals
Florida	1
California	2

Final
California	2
Fresno State	0

California qualifies for WCWS.

=== Regional No. 7 ===
First round
1	LSU	7
6	Northwestern State	1
2	Southern Miss	3
5	Oregon	0
3	Hofstra	2
4	Louisiana–Lafayette	1

Second round
LSU	1
Louisiana–Lafayette	4
Northwestern State	1
Oregon	4
Southern Miss	14
Hofstra	1
LSU	2
Hofstra	1

Third round
Louisiana–Lafayette	3
Oregon	4
Southern Miss	0
LSU	1^{13}

Semifinals
Oregon	1
Southern Miss	3

Final
Southern Miss	1^{9}
LSU	0

Southern Miss qualifies for WCWS.

=== Regional No. 8 ===
First round
1	Central Michigan	2^{13}
6	Stanford	1
2	Notre Dame	2
5	UIC	0
3	DePaul	8^{6}
4	Michigan	0

Second round
Central Michigan	0
UIC	2
Michigan	5
Stanford	4
Notre Dame	0
DePaul	1
Central Michigan	2
Notre Dame	1

Third round
UIC	1
Michigan	3
DePaul	5
Central Michigan	0

Final
Michigan	0	—
DePaul	3	—

DePaul qualifies for WCWS.

== Women's College World Series ==
The Women's College World Series was held 24 through May 28 in Oklahoma City.

=== Participants ===
- Alabama
- Arizona
- California
- DePaul
- Oklahoma
- Southern Miss
- UCLA
- Washington

=== Bracket ===
Round of 16
Washington	3
DePaul	2
UCLA	4
Alabama	1
DePaul	4
Alabama	6
Oklahoma	2
California	1
Southern Miss	1
Arizona	0
California	0
Arizona	6

Quarterfinals
Washington	2
UCLA	3
Southern Miss	3
Alabama	0
Oklahoma	3
Southern Miss	1
Washington	2
Arizona	4

Semifinals
UCLA	6	—
Southern Miss	0	—
Oklahoma	1	—
Arizona	0	—

Finals
UCLA	1
Oklahoma	3

=== Game results ===
Date	Game	Winning team	Score	Losing team	Winning pitcher	Losing pitcher	Save	Notes
May 28	Game 11	UCLA	6–0	Southern Miss			–	Southern Miss eliminated
May 28	Game 12	Oklahoma	1–0	Arizona			–	Arizona eliminated
Finals
May 29	Game 13	Oklahoma	3–1	UCLA	Jennifer Stewart	Amanda Freed	–	Oklahoma wins WCWS

=== Final ===
National championship
Oklahoma	v.	UCLA

May 29, 2000 – 12:15 p.m. (CDT) at ASA Hall of Fame Stadium in Oklahoma City, Oklahoma
Team	1	2	3	4	5	6	7	R	H	E
Oklahoma	0	0	3	0	0	0	0	3	8	1
UCLA	0	0	0	0	0	1	0	1	8	1
WP: Jennifer Stewart (–) LP: Amanda Freed (28–8); Home runs: OKLA: Lisa Carey; UCLA: None; Attendance: 8,049; Boxscore

=== All-tournament Team ===
The following players were members of the Women's College World Series All-Tournament Team.

Position	Player	School
P	Courtney Blades	Southern Miss
P	Amanda Freed	UCLA
P	Jennifer Stewart (MOP)	Oklahoma
1B	Lisa Carey	Oklahoma
2B	Tairia Mims	UCLA
SS	Kelli Braitsch	Oklahoma
OF	Jaime Clark	Alabama
OF	Shavaughne Desecki	Washington
OF	Kelly Kretschman	DePaul
C	Julie Marshall	UCLA
3B	Erin Johnson	Southern Miss
3B	Toni Mascarenas	Arizona

== See also ==
- 2000 NCAA Division II softball tournament
- 2000 NCAA Division III softball tournament
- 2000 NAIA softball tournament
- 2000 NCAA Division I baseball tournament
