= Mickey Dean =

American softball coach (born 1965)

Biographical details
- Born: November 5, 1965 (age 60); Elkton, Virginia, U.S.
- Education: Elon

Playing career
- 1984–1987: Elon
- Position: Pitcher

Coaching career (HC unless noted)
- 2001–2002: Akron (asst.)
- 2002–2004: Indiana (asst.)
- 2005–2006: Longwood (AHC)
- 2007–2012: Radford
- 2013–2017: James Madison
- 2018–2024: Auburn

Head coaching record
- Overall: 713–302 (.702)
- Tournaments: NCAA: 17–20 (.459)

Accomplishments and honors

Championships
- 4× Big South Regular Season Champions (2009–2012) 2× Big South Tournament Champions (2009, 2010); 4× CAA Regular Season Champions (2014–2017) 3× CAA Tournament Champions (2014, 2016, 2017)

Awards
- 4× CAA Coach of the Year (2014–2017); 4× Big South Coach of the Year (2009–2012)

Mickey Dean is an American softball coach who most recently served as the head coach at Auburn.

== Early life and education ==
Dean graduated from Elon University in 1987. Dean pitched for the Phoenix baseball team and was a four-year letter winner.

== Coaching career ==
=== Auburn ===
On September 14, 2017, Dean was named the head coach at Auburn, replacing Clint Myers who resigned in August 2017, amid accusations against him and his assistants. In March 2024, Dean announced he would step down following the 2024 season.

== Personal life ==
Dean is married to his wife Liz, and they have two adult children.

== Head coaching record ==
=== College ===
Record table
Season	Team	Overall	Conference	Standing	Postseason
Radford Highlanders (Big South Conference) (2007–2012)
2007	Radford	44–27	9–6	3rd	
2008	Radford	46–15	13–2	2nd	
2009	Radford	41–15	16–2	1st	NCAA Regional
2010	Radford	38–17	16–2	1st	NCAA Regional
2011	Radford	38–21	14–4	1st	
2012	Radford	34–21	16–5	1st	
Radford:		241–116 (.675)	84–21 (.800)		
James Madison Dukes (Colonial Athletic Association) (2013–2017)
2013	James Madison	42–17	18–3	2nd	NCAA Regional
2014	James Madison	45–15	15–3	1st	NCAA Regional
2015	James Madison	48–10	19–0	1st	NCAA Regional
2016	James Madison	50–6	18–1	1st	NCAA Super Regional
2017	James Madison	52–8	18–2	1st	NCAA Regional
James Madison:		237–56 (.809)	88–9 (.907)		
Auburn Tigers (Southeastern Conference) (2018–Present)
2018	Auburn	41–17	11–12	9th	NCAA Regional
2019	Auburn	39–21	10–14	10th	NCAA Regional
2020	Auburn	16–11 (Note: The season was not played past March 11 due to the COVID-19 pandemic in the United States.)	0–3		Postseason not held
2021	Auburn	27–24	7–17	12th	NCAA Regional
2022	Auburn	40–17	11–13	10th	NCAA Regional
2023	Auburn	43–19	15–9	3rd	NCAA Regional
2024	Auburn	29–21–1	9–15	10th	NCAA Regional
Auburn:		235–130–1 (.643)	63–83 (.432)		
Total:		713–302–1 (.702)			
National champion Postseason invitational champion Conference regular season champion Conference regular season and conference tournament champion Division regular season champion Division regular season and conference tournament champion Conference tournament champion
