= James Madison Dukes softball =

James Madison Dukes Softball
- University: James Madison University
- Head coach: Loren LaPorte (9th season)
- Conference: Sun Belt
- Location: Harrisonburg, Virginia, US
- Home stadium: Veterans Memorial Park (capacity: 1,500)
- Nickname: Dukes
- Colors: Purple and gold

NCAA WCWS appearances
- 2021

NCAA super regional appearances
- 2016, 2019, 2021

NCAA Tournament appearances
- 2009, 2013, 2014, 2015, 2016, 2017, 2018, 2019, 2021

Conference tournament championships
- 2009, 2014, 2016, 2017, 2019, 2021

Regular-season conference championships
- 2009, 2013, 2014, 2016, 2017, 2018, 2019, 2021

The James Madison Dukes softball is the team that represents James Madison University in NCAA Division I college softball. The team currently participates in the Sun Belt Conference (SBC) and they play their home games in Veterans Memorial Park. JMU has won six CAA championships, including back-to-back Championships in 2016 and 2017. The Dukes have been to the NCAA Division I softball tournament nine times, hosting Regionals and Super Regionals in 2016. The team's current head coach is Loren LaPorte, leading the Dukes to a 197–74 record in her first six seasons.

== Coaching history ==
Years	Coach	Record	%
2002–2012	Katie Flynn	283–252	.528
2013–2017	Mickey Dean	187–49	.738
2017–present	Loren LaPorte	197–74	.727

== Season results ==
Season	Coach	Record	CAA Record	Notes
2002	Katie Flynn	25–24	5–9	
2003	Katie Flynn	19–31	5–3	
2004	Katie Flynn	30–32	12–6	
2005	Katie Flynn	28–27	8–10	
2006	Katie Flynn	24–28	9–12	
2007	Katie Flynn	38–16	16–4	
2008	Katie Flynn	32–22	16–8	
2009	Katie Flynn	35–16	12–8	CAA Champions, NCAA Regionals
2010	Katie Flynn	24–33	11–10	
2011	Katie Flynn	29–23	8–11	
2012	Katie Flynn	30–26	15–5	
2013	Mickey Dean	42–17	18–3	NCAA Regionals
2014	Mickey Dean	45–15	15–3	CAA Champions, NCAA Regionals
2015	Mickey Dean	48–10	19–0	NCAA Regionals
2016	Mickey Dean	50–6	18–1	CAA Champions, NCAA Super Regionals
2017	Mickey Dean	52–8	18–2	CAA Champions, NCAA Regionals
2018	Loren LaPorte	43–14	19–2	NCAA Regionals
2019	Loren LaPorte	51–10	20–1	CAA Champions, NCAA Super Regionals
2020	Loren LaPorte	13–6	0–0	Season cancelled due to COVID-19 pandemic
2021	Loren LaPorte	41–4	17–1	CAA Champions, Women's College World Series
2022	Loren LaPorte	21–21	10–5	
2023	Loren LaPorte	28–19	13–11	

2021 Season

After a dominant performance in the regular season, the Dukes entered the postseason with a 34–1 record. In the CAA tournament, the Dukes beat Delaware for their sixth conference title and were rewarded with the conference's automatic bid to the NCAA softball tournament.

The Dukes advanced to the Super Regionals after beating #9 Tennessee and #25 Liberty twice in the Knoxville Regional. They then went on to beat #8 Mizzou on the road in the best-of-three series in Columbia, Missouri.

After punching their ticket to the Women's College World Series (WCWS) for the first time, the James Madison Dukes advanced to the WCWS semifinals after beating #1 Oklahoma 4–3 in eight innings and #5 Oklahoma State 2–1 in the first and second rounds of the tournament. In doing so, they became the first-ever unseeded team to start 2–0 in the WCWS and reach the semifinal games. Their historic run came to a close just short of the finals, falling to eventual champions #1 Oklahoma twice.

== Championships ==
=== Conference Championships ===
Season	Conference	Record	Head Coach
2009	Colonial Athletic Association	35–16	Katie Flynn
2014	Colonial Athletic Association	45–15	Mickey Dean
2016	Colonial Athletic Association	50–6	Mickey Dean
2017	Colonial Athletic Association	52–8	Mickey Dean
2019	Colonial Athletic Association	51–10	Loren LaPorte
2021	Colonial Athletic Association	41–4	Loren LaPorte

== NCAA Regional appearances ==
NCAA Regional Results
2009 Knoxville, Tennessee Regional

Lost to Tennessee, 3–4
Lost to Jacksonville State, 0–6

2013 Knoxville, Tennessee Regional

Lost to NC State, 0–2
Defeated Longwood, 5–0
Lost to NC State, 4–6

2014 Lexington, Kentucky Regional

Defeated DePaul, 6–1
Lost to Kentucky, 1–2
Lost to DePaul, 3–4

2015 Harrisonburg, Virginia Regional

Defeated Binghamton, 10–1^{5}
Lost to NC State, 0–2
Lost to Fordham, 1–2

2016 Harrisonburg, Virginia Regional

Defeated Princeton, 7–0
Defeated North Carolina, 10–1
Defeated Longwood, 5–1

2017 Waco, Texas Regional

Defeated Oregon State, 3–2
Lost to Baylor, 2–4
Defeated Kent State, 4–0
Lost to Baylor, 0–1

2018 Knoxville, Tennessee Regional

Defeated Ohio, 2–1
Lost to Tennessee, 3–12
Lost to Ohio, 3–7

2019 Ann Arbor, Michigan Regional

Defeated DePaul, 5–2
Lost to Michigan, 0–1^{12}
Defeated DePaul, 3–0
Defeated Michigan, 3–0
Defeated Michigan, 2–1

2021 Knoxville, Tennessee Regional

Defeated Liberty, 4–3^{10}
Defeated Tennessee, 3–1
Defeated Liberty, 8–5

== Notable players ==
=== National awards ===
NFCA National Player of the Year

- Megan Good (2017)

Softball America Pitcher of the Year

- Odicci Alexander (2021)

D1 Softball's Woman of the Year

- Odicci Alexander (2021)

=== All-Americans ===
- 2014: Jailyn Ford (2nd team)
- 2015: Megan Good (2nd team)
- 2015: Jailyn Ford (3rd team)
- 2016: Jailyn Ford (1st team)
- 2016: Megan Good (1st team)
- 2017: Megan Good (1st team)
- 2018: Megan Good (1st team)
- 2018: Odicci Alexander (3rd team)
- 2018: Kate Gordon (3rd team)
- 2019: Odicci Alexander (3rd team)
- 2019: Megan Good (3rd team)
- 2019: Kate Gordon (3rd team)
- 2021: Odicci Alexander (2nd team)

== Coaching Staff Awards ==
- NFCA Division I National Coaching Staff of the Year (2021)
- NFCA Northeast Coaching Staff of the Year (2021)
