= Hofstra Pride softball =

- 2026 Hofstra Pride Softball Team
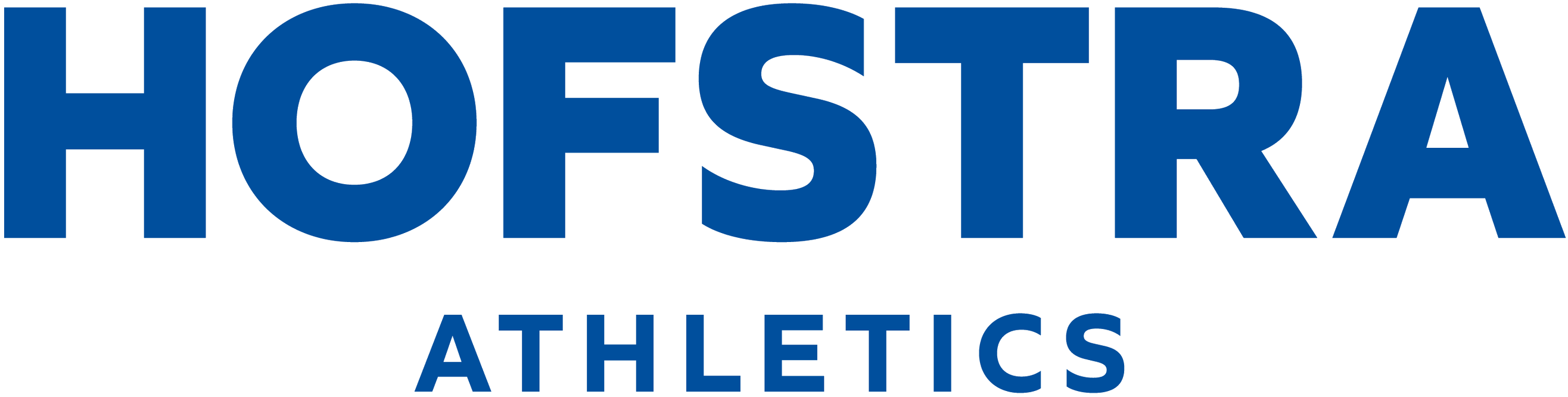
- Founded: 1984; 42 years ago
- University: Hofstra University
- Athletic director: Rick Cole, Jr.
- Head coach: Susan Cassidy-Lyke (1st season)
- Conference: CAA
- Location: Hempstead, New York
- Home stadium: Bill Edwards Stadium (capacity: 1,000)
- Nickname: Pride
- Colors: Blue, white, and gold

NCAA super regional appearances
- 2012

NCAA Tournament appearances
- 1993, 1995, 1999, 2000, 2001, 2003, 2004, 2005, 2006, 2007, 2008, 2010, 2012, 2013, 2014, 2015, 2018, 2023

Conference tournament championships
- ECC/AEC: 1995, 1998, 1999, 2000, 2001; CAA: 2002, 2003, 2004, 2005, 2006, 2007, 2008, 2015, 2018, 2023

Regular-season conference championships
- ECC/AEC: 1995, 1996, 1997, 1998, 1999, 2000, 2001; CAA: 2002, 2003, 2004, 2005, 2007, 2008, 2009, 2010, 2011, 2012, 2013, 2026

The Hofstra Pride softball team represents Hofstra University in NCAA Division I college softball. The team belongs to the Colonial Athletic Association and plays home games at Bill Edwards Stadium, which was named in honor of longtime coach Bill Edwards in 2015. The Pride have gone to the NCAA Tournament seventeen times, with their best finish being a Super Regionals Appearance in 2012, losing to South Florida by just one run to miss a spot in the Women's College World Series.

== Year-by-year results ==
Results are from the NCAA Database along with Hofstra's respective conferences and are as of Hofstra's start as a Division I team in 1984.

Season	Coach	Record		Notes
Season	Coach	Overall	Conference	Notes
Independent
1984	Joe Botti	6-10	—	
1986	Marc E Fazio	9-20	—	
1987	Marc E Fazio	14-17	—	
1988	Marc E Fazio	24-11	—	
East Coast Conference
1989	Sharon Giblin	16-22	5-9	
1990	Bill Edwards	19–7–1	7-7	
1991	Bill Edwards	24–13	7-5	
1992	Bill Edwards	35–7–1	9-1	
Independent
1993	Bill Edwards	37-12	7-5	NCAA Tournament
East Coast Conference
1994	Bill Edwards	39-16	3-0	
North Atlantic Conference/ America East Conference
1995	Bill Edwards	41-21	10-1	NCAA Tournament
1996	Bill Edwards	33-18	12-0	
1997	Bill Edwards	38–16	12-0	
1998	Bill Edwards	39-17	9-3	
1999	Bill Edwards	40-19	11-3	NCAA Tournament
2000	Bill Edwards	42-21	22-4	NCAA Tournament
2001	Bill Edwards	37-26	20-6	NCAA Tournament
Colonial Athletic Conference
2002	Bill Edwards	28-25	11-2	
2003	Bill Edwards	39-17	12-2	NCAA Tournament
2004	Bill Edwards	38-21	14-4	NCAA Regional Finalists
2005	Bill Edwards	43–16–1	14-2	NCAA Regional Finalists
2006	Bill Edwards	37-20	14-6	NCAA Tournament
2007	Bill Edwards	41-15	17–3	NCAA Tournament
2008	Bill Edwards	45-13	18-3	NCAA Tournament
2009	Bill Edwards	26-21	14-3	
2010	Bill Edwards	45-12	18-2	NCAA Regional Finalists
2011	Bill Edwards	40-13	19-1	
2012	Bill Edwards	42-15	19-0	NCAA Regional Champions
2013	Bill Edwards	46-13	18-2	NCAA Regional Finalists
2014	Bill Edwards	34-15	11-4	NCAA Tournament
2015	Larissa Anderson	38–14–1	17-3	NCAA Tournament
2016	Larissa Anderson	24-22	8-10	
2017	Larissa Anderson	27-23	11-8	
2018	Larissa Anderson	41-14	17-4	NCAA Tournament
2019	Jay Miller	20-27	7-13	
2020	Jay Miller	3-15	0-0	†
2021	Jay Miller	16-16	6-8	
2022	Adrienne Clarke	21-27	13-6	
2023	Adrienne Clarke	29-25	16-7	NCAA Tournament
2024	Adrienne Clarke	23-26	17-10	
2025	Adrienne Clarke	22-28	15-12	
2026	Susan Cassidy-Lyke	31-23	21-3	

†NCAA canceled 2020 collegiate activities due to the COVID-19 virus.

== Retired Numbers ==
Hofstra Softball has retired six numbers in the program's history with Crystal Boyd's number thirteen being the first retired in 2008.

Hofstra Pride retired numbers
No.	Player	Years	Ref.
1	Kayleigh Lotti	2006–09	
2	Olivia Galati	2010–13	
13	Crystal Boyd	1991–94	
19	Stacy Jackson	1992–95	
19	Ashley Lane	2004–07	
23	Alicia Smith	1997–2000	
