= Southern Miss Golden Eagles =

Athletics program of the University of Southern Mississippi

- University: University of Southern Mississippi
- Nickname: Golden Eagles
- NCAA: Division I (FBS)
- Conference: Sun Belt (primary); CUSA (beach volleyball)
- Athletic director: Jeremy McClain
- Location: Hattiesburg, Mississippi
- Varsity teams: 17
- Football stadium: M.M. Roberts Stadium
- Basketball arena: Reed Green Coliseum
- Baseball stadium: Pete Taylor Park
- Other venues: Southern Miss Softball Complex; Marshall Bell Track & Field and Soccer Complex
- Colors: Black and gold
- Mascot: Seymour d'Campus
- Fight song: Southern to the Top
- Website: southernmiss.com

The Southern Miss Golden Eagles and Lady Eagles (also known as Southern Mississippi Golden Eagles and Lady Eagles) are the intercollegiate athletics teams that represent the University of Southern Mississippi (USM), located in Hattiesburg, Mississippi. The Golden Eagles (Lady Eagles for women's basketball) compete at the National Collegiate Athletic Association (NCAA) Division I level mainly as a member of the Sun Belt Conference (SBC). USM's newest sport of women's beach volleyball, a sport not currently sponsored by the Sun Belt, was added in the 2018–19 school year and competes in Conference USA. The school's earliest nickname was Tigers. Thereafter came such nicknames as Normalites (from Mississippi Normal College, the early name of the university), Yellow Jackets, Confederates, and Southerners. Golden Eagles was selected in a student/alumni vote in the early 1972. Seymour d'Campus is the name of the modern-day mascot eagle.

Southern Miss has a long history in the NCAA, and its intercollegiate sports teams operate under the auspices of the university's Department of Intercollegiate Athletics sponsors. Bowl games, conference championships, and All-American athletes have all been frequent occurrences at Southern Miss. Among notable alumni are former NFL quarterback Brett Favre and former NFL punter Ray Guy.

== Sports sponsored ==
| Men's sports | Women's sports |
|---|---|
| Baseball | Basketball |
| Basketball | Beach volleyball |
| Football | Cross country |
| Golf | Golf |
| Tennis | Soccer |
| Track and field^{†} | Softball |
| | Tennis |
| | Track and field^{†} |
| | Volleyball |
† – Track and field includes both indoor and outdoor

=== Football ===
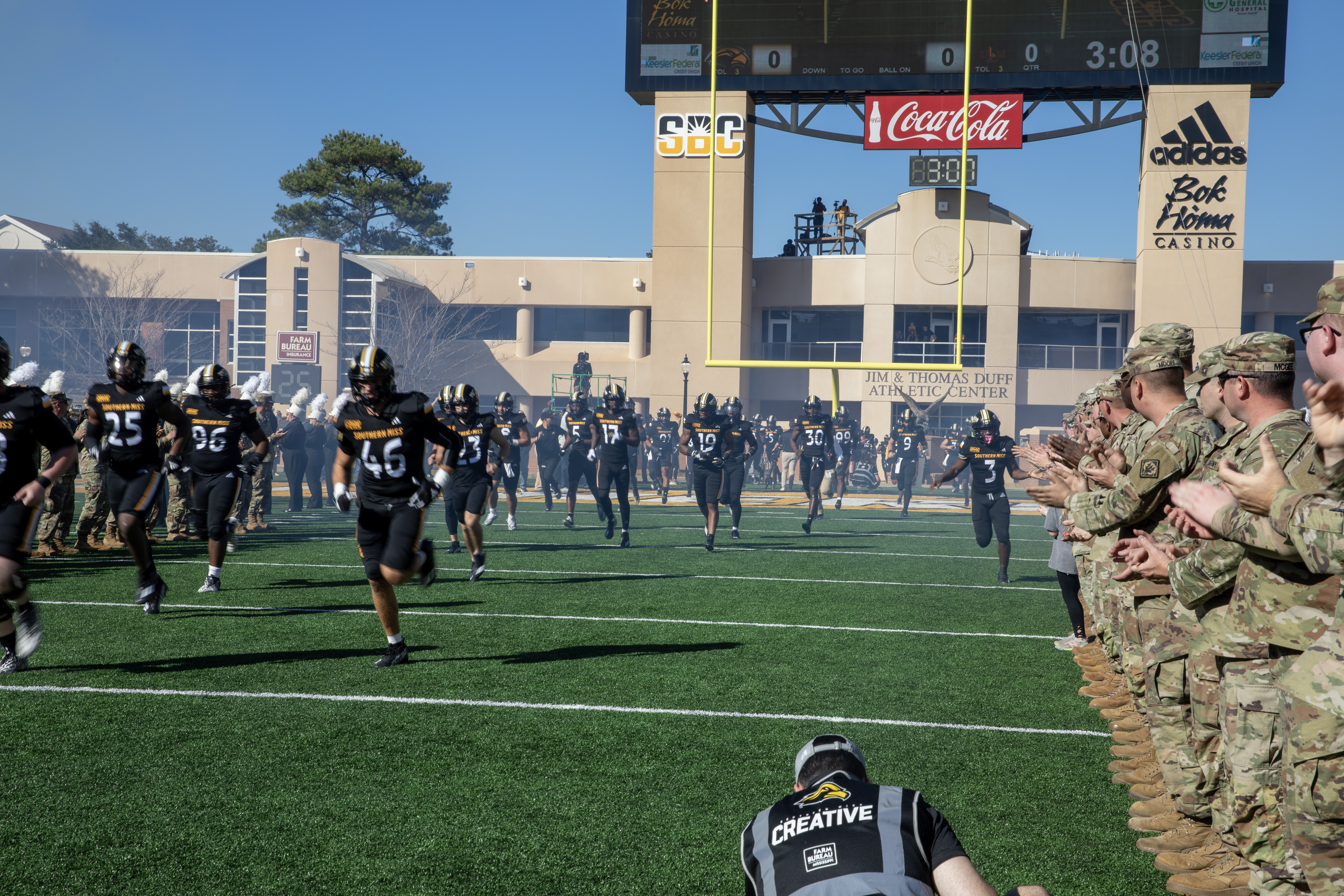
Southern Miss entering the field in 2023

The Southern Miss Golden Eagles football team participates as a member of the Sun Belt Conference and plays its home games in M.M. Roberts Stadium. In 2008, after 17 years at the helm of the USM Football program, Jeff Bower was replaced by Larry Fedora. The football team won two College Division national championships (as Mississippi Southern College, in 1958 and 1962), and won three of the first four Conference USA titles. Through the 2011 season, Southern Miss has posted 16 consecutive winning seasons. The program has had three undefeated seasons overall, including a 9–0 season in 1958. Thirty All-Americans have played for Southern Miss, including 12 first-team selections, and a number of players have moved on to the National Football League, most notably Dawg Pound creator and three time consecutive Pro-bowler Hanford Dixon, NFL Team of the Century punter Ray Guy and three-time NFL MVP Brett Favre.

==== Rivalries ====
Sun Belt Conference logo in Southern Miss' colors

- East Carolina — Southern Miss and East Carolina met 8 times between 1951–1980. The two teams then faced off every year from 1983 to 2013 when conference realignment brought an end to the series. Southern Miss leads the series 27–12.
- Louisiana Tech — The rivalry between Southern Miss and Louisiana Tech spans over 40 games and originated in 1935. The Southern Miss & Louisiana Tech Rivalry, or Rivalry in Dixie, was recently renewed in 2010. Southern Miss leads the series 35–17.
- Memphis — The long-standing rivalry between Southern Miss and Memphis dates back to October 26, 1935, and is often referred to as the Black and Blue Bowl. This yearly classic garnered its name from the intense competitive nature of the contest, as well as the competing schools' colors: the black of Southern Miss and the blue of Memphis. From 1995 to 2012, both teams were members of Conference USA in the Eastern Division, and the teams played each other every year. The series has been on hiatus since Memphis joined the American Athletic Conference. Southern Miss leads the series 40–22–1.
- Mississippi State — The instate rivalry between the Bulldogs and Golden Eagles spans almost half a century. The two schools have played numerous contests, but a twenty-three year hiatus cooled the rivalry to some extent. The rivalry was resumed when the two teams met in August 2014 in Starkville, and again in September 2015 in Hattiesburg. State holds a 14–13–2 edge in the all-time series.
- Tulane — The rivalry between Southern Miss and Tulane Green Wave football was born on the evening of October 13, 1979, and is known as The Battle for the Bell. As members of Conference USA the two teams played each other every year until 2006, when the league was split into Eastern and Western Divisions. Following their 2010 meeting, Southern Miss leads the series 23–7. The rivalry in all sports has been dormant since Tulane left Conference USA for the American Athletic Conference in 2014.

=== Basketball ===
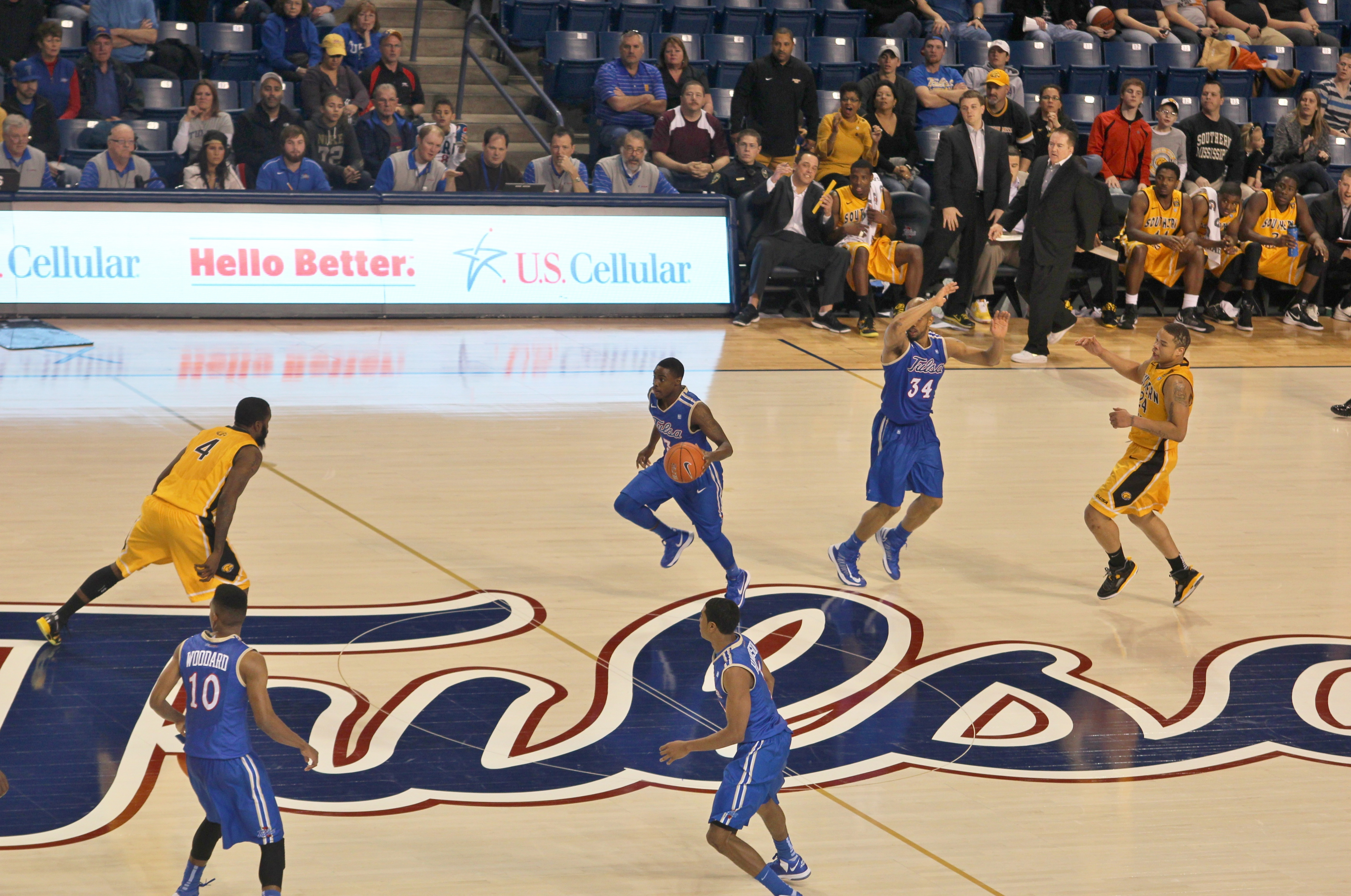
Southern Miss (in yellow) v Tulsa in 2013

Over the years, the Golden Eagles have had three NCAA teams. The program has also had an NIT Championship team with its run in the 1987 postseason tournament. The team has had six players drafted including Clarence Weatherspoon. Southern Miss has won two conference championships in basketball including a share of the 2001 regular-season title. The team has appeared in three NCAA tournaments. They have an overall 0–3 record in tournament games. Darrin Chancellor holds the Southern Miss single-tournament scoring record with 24 points in 1991. The Golden Eagles have also appeared in the National Invitation Tournament (NIT) ten times. Their combined record is 11–9 and they were NIT Champions in 1987.

=== Women's basketball ===
The Lady Eagles also have a storied history. With 10 postseason appearances, the women's program is the most proficient at Southern Miss. In those 10 appearances, they have made the NCAA Tournament 8 times advancing to the Sweet 16 in 1994. The team has had two All-Americans including Janice Felder in 1994. In 2014–2015 season the Lady Eagles advanced to the 2015 WNIT Elite 8 vs Michigan, which was the best postseason run in history. An attendance record was set in lady eagle history on March 29, 2015, when 5,480 spectators watched Southern Miss vs Michigan.

=== Baseball ===
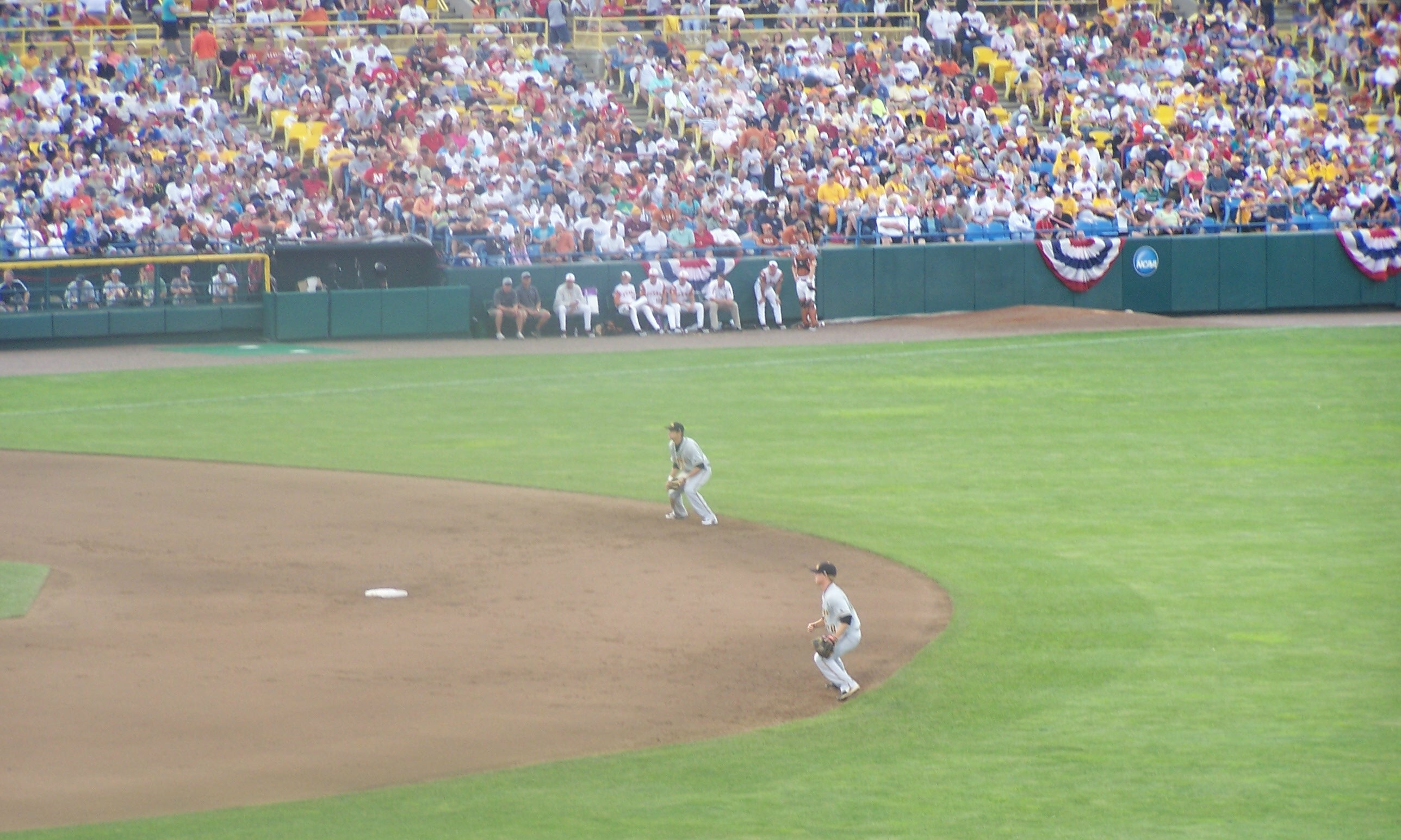
Southern Miss 2B James Ewing and SS B.A. Vollmuth play in a 2009 College World Series game.

The Southern Miss Golden Eagles baseball team made its first ever appearance in the College World Series in 2009.

=== Softball ===
The Southern Miss Lady Eagles softball team made it to the Women's College World Series in 1999 and 2000 behind the arm of Courtney Blades. They play their home games at Southern Miss Softball Complex at the University of Southern Mississippi.

== Traditions ==
Eagle Fever, Anyone. Anywhere. Anytime. and Go Gold! are the rallying cries that Golden Eagle students and fans have used to create such traditions as Homecoming and EagleFest, tailgating in The District, Friday Night at the Fountain pep rallies, the Eagle Walk at The Rock, the game-day Eagle Walk parade, the Painting of the Eagle Walk, the Junior Eagle Club Tunnel, the band's Fifth Quarter Concert, featuring a rendition of Amazing Grace.

=== Mascot ===
The first athletic teams were called Tigers or Normalites. In 1924, the mascot was changed to the Yellow Jackets. In April 1940, the student body of the newly renamed Mississippi Southern College voted to name the teams Confederates; the name was changed to the Southerners in 1941. General Nat (named for Confederate general Nathan Bedford Forrest) became the Southerners' mascot in 1953; his horse was named Son of Dixie.

In 1972, an ad hoc committee appointed by the Alumni Association voted on submissions from alumni, faculty, students, and staff for a new name, and the name "Golden Eagles" was chosen. The mascot was an individual in a golden eagle costume. The mascot was later named Seymour d'Campus (a pun on "see more [of] the campus"). The name was inspired by the 1984 World's Fair mascot, Seymore D. Fair (a pun on "see more [of] the Fair"), who was played by former Southern Miss mascot Jeff Davis '83.

Seymour d'Campus has competed in a number of Universal Cheerleaders Association (UCA) mascot competitions, ranking 21st in 2000, 11th in 2001, 7th in 2002, and 15th in 2003. In 2008 he ranked 10th and was also chosen to be one of the 12 members of the Capital One All American Mascot Team.
