= 2017 NCAA Division I softball season =

American college softball season

- Defending Champions: Oklahoma

Tournament

Women's College World Series
- Champions: Oklahoma (4th title)
- Runners-up: Florida (8th WCWS Appearance)
- Winning Coach: Patty Gasso (4th title)
- WCWS MOP: Shay Knighten (Oklahoma)

Seasons
- ← 2016 2018 →

The 2017 NCAA Division I softball season, play of college softball in the United States organized by the National Collegiate Athletic Association (NCAA) at the Division I level, began in February 2017. The season progressed through the regular season, many conference tournaments and championship series, and concluded with the 2017 NCAA Division I softball tournament and 2017 Women's College World Series. The Women's College World Series, consisting of the eight remaining teams in the NCAA Tournament and held annually in Oklahoma City at ASA Hall of Fame Stadium, ended on June 4, 2017.

== Conference standings ==
2017 American Athletic Conference softball standings
	Conf.				Overall
Team	W		L	PCT	W		L	PCT
No. 22 Tulsa ‍†‍‡‍^{y}	15	–	3	.833	37	–	15	.712
Houston ‍‍‍	12	–	6	.667	28	–	24	.538
UCF ‍‍‍	11	–	7	.611	29	–	22	.569
South Florida ‍‍‍	9	–	8	.529	32	–	23	.582
Memphis ‍‍‍	7	–	11	.389	28	–	26	.519
East Carolina ‍‍‍	5	–	13	.278	25	–	29	.463
UConn ‍‍‍	3	–	14	.176	17	–	30	.362
† – Conference champion ‡ – Tournament champion y – Invited to the NCAA tournament As of May 23, 2017; Rankings from Today/NFCA Coaches

2017 Big 12 Conference softball standings
	Conf.				Overall
Team	W		L	PCT	W		L	PCT
No. 1 Oklahoma ‍†‍‡‍^{y}	17	–	1	.944	61	–	9	.871
No. 7 Baylor ‍‍‍^{y}	13	–	5	.722	48	–	15	.762
Oklahoma State ‍‍‍^{y}	12	–	6	.667	38	–	25	.603
Texas ‍‍‍^{y}	7	–	10	.412	33	–	26	.559
Iowa State ‍‍‍	6	–	12	.333	23	–	35	.397
Texas Tech ‍‍‍	4	–	14	.222	19	–	36	.345
Kansas ‍‍‍	3	–	14	.176	24	–	28	.462
† – Conference champion ‡ – Tournament champion y – Invited to the NCAA tournament Rankings from NFCA

2017 Big Ten Conference softball standings
	Conf.						Overall
Team	W		L		T	PCT	W		L		T	PCT
No. 2 Minnesota‡ ‍‍‍	22	–	1	–	0	.957	51	–	3	–	0	.944
No. 17 Michigan ‍‍‍	20	–	3	–	0	.870	41	–	10	–	1	.798
Ohio State ‍‍‍	15	–	8	–	0	.652	33	–	15	–	0	.688
Illinois ‍‍‍	14	–	8	–	0	.636	36	–	17	–	0	.679
Nebraska ‍‍‍	13	–	10	–	0	.565	24	–	29	–	0	.453
Wisconsin ‍‍‍	11	–	11	–	0	.500	33	–	14	–	0	.702
Michigan State ‍‍‍	11	–	12	–	0	.478	30	–	21	–	0	.588
Northwestern ‍‍‍	10	–	13	–	0	.435	25	–	28	–	0	.472
Indiana ‍‍‍	9	–	14	–	0	.391	23	–	31	–	0	.426
Iowa ‍‍‍	9	–	14	–	0	.391	19	–	32	–	0	.373
Purdue ‍‍‍	9	–	14	–	0	.391	20	–	36	–	0	.357
Penn State ‍‍‍	8	–	15	–	0	.348	23	–	32	–	0	.418
Rutgers ‍‍‍	5	–	18	–	0	.217	14	–	37	–	0	.275
Maryland ‍‍‍	4	–	19	–	0	.174	11	–	39	–	1	.225
‡ – Tournament champion As of May 9, 2017; Rankings from NFCA

2017 Ohio Valley Conference softball standings
	Conf.				Overall
Team	W		L	PCT	W		L	PCT
Jacksonville State ‡ ‍‍‍	15	–	1	.938	40	–	10	.800
SIU Edwardsville ‍‍‍	13	–	5	.722	41	–	13	.759
UT Martin + ‍‍‍	13	–	5	.722	40	–	22	.645
Eastern Illinois ‍‍‍	10	–	5	.667	28	–	21	.571
Murray State + ‍‍‍	11	–	7	.611	36	–	20	.643
Eastern Kentucky ‍‍‍	11	–	9	.550	27	–	31	.466
Tennessee Tech ‍‍‍	8	–	8	.500	16	–	30	.348
Belmont ‍‍‍	10	–	12	.455	35	–	22	.614
Southeast Missouri State ‍‍‍	8	–	14	.364	23	–	27	.460
Morehead State ‍‍‍	6	–	12	.333	26	–	22	.542
Austin Peay ‍‍‍	5	–	15	.250	17	–	31	.354
Tennessee State ‍‍‍	2	–	19	.095	12	–	37	.245
‡ – OVC Tournament}] champion += to NICS; As of May 22, 2017; Rankings from USA Today/NFCA Coaches

2015 Pac-12 Conference softball standings
	Conf.				Overall
Team	W		L	PCT	W		L	PCT
No. 9 Arizona ‍†‍‍^{y}	18	–	6	.750	52	–	9	.852
No. 4 Oregon ‍‍‍^{y}	17	–	6	.739	54	–	8	.871
No. 3 Washington ‍‍‍^{y}	16	–	8	.667	50	–	14	.781
No. 5 UCLA ‍‍‍^{y}	16	–	8	.667	48	–	15	.762
No. 14 Utah ‍‍‍^{y}	13	–	9	.591	37	–	16	.698
No. 23 Arizona State ‍‍‍^{y}	9	–	15	.375	31	–	22	.585
Oregon State ‍‍‍^{y}	9	–	15	.375	28	–	27	.509
California ‍‍‍^{y}	6	–	17	.261	31	–	24	.564
Stanford ‍‍‍	2	–	22	.083	19	–	32	.373
† – Conference champion y – Invited to the NCAA tournament As of June 30, 2017; Rankings from NFCA/USA Today

2017 Southeastern Conference softball standings
	Conf.				Overall
Team	W		L	PCT	W		L	PCT
No. 2 Florida ‍†‍‍^{y}	20	–	3	.870	58	–	10	.853
No. 13 Auburn ‍‍‍^{y}	17	–	7	.708	49	–	12	.803
No. 11 Tennessee ‍‍‍^{y}	16	–	7	.696	48	–	12	.800
No. 8 Texas A&M ‍‍‍^{y}	16	–	7	.696	47	–	13	.783
No. 12 Alabama ‍‍‍^{y}	12	–	11	.522	46	–	18	.719
No. 6 LSU ‍‍‍^{y}	12	–	12	.500	48	–	22	.686
No. 17 Kentucky ‍‍‍^{y}	12	–	12	.500	39	–	19	.672
No. 16 Ole Miss ‍‍‡‍^{y}	10	–	14	.417	43	–	20	.683
Mississippi State ‍‍‍^{y}	10	–	14	.417	36	–	22	.621
South Carolina ‍‍‍^{y}	8	–	15	.348	34	–	25	.576
Missouri ‍‍‍^{y}	7	–	16	.304	29	–	28	.509
Arkansas ‍‍‍^{y}	7	–	17	.292	31	–	24	.564
No. 25 Georgia ‍‍‍^{y}	6	–	18	.250	35	–	23	.603
† – Conference champion ‡ – Tournament champion y – Invited to the NCAA tournament As of May 31, 2017; Rankings from NFCA

2017 Southland Conference softball standings
	Conf.						Overall
Team	W		L		PCT		W	L		PCT
McNeese State ** ‍‍‡‍^{y}	24	–	3	–	0	.889		43	–	18	–	0	.705
Abilene Christian * ‍‍‍	20	–	7	–	0	.741		33	–	22	–	0	.600
Nicholls ‍‍‍	19	–	8	–	0	.704		37	–	20	–	0	.649
Lamar ‍‍‍	17	–	10	–	0	.630		34	–	31	–	0	.523
Sam Houston ‍‍‍	14	–	13	–	0	.519		24	–	27	–	0	.471
Central Arkansas ‍‍‍	14	–	13	–	0	.519		25	–	34	–	0	.424
Southeastern Louisiana ‍‍‍	12	–	15	–	0	.444		26	–	29	–	0	.473
Northwestern State ‍‍‍	12	–	15	–	0	.444		23	–	33	–	1	.412
Stephen F. Austin ‍‍‍	9	–	15	–	0	.375		17	–	33	–	0	.340
Houston Baptist ‍‍‍	8	–	19	–	0	.296		17	–	26	–	0	.395
Incarnate Word * ‍‍‍	6	–	21	–	0	.222		13	–	40	–	0	.245
Texas A&M–Corpus Christi ‍‍‍	4	–	20	–	0	.167		10	–	36	–	0	.217
† – Conference champion ‡ – SLC Tournament Champion *ineligible for postseason play due to Div. I transition **Southland Tournament #1 seed and regular season champion y – Invited to the NCAA Division I Baseball Championship; As of May 30, 2017; Rankings from USA Today/NFCA Coaches

2017 Sun Belt Conference softball standings
	Conf.				Overall
Team	W		L	PCT	W		L	PCT
No. 19 Louisiana–Lafayette ‍†‍‡‍^{y}	23	–	1	.958	47	–	8	.855
RV Texas State ‍‍‍^{y}	18	–	8	.692	42	–	17	.712
Georgia State ‍‍‍^{y}	18	–	9	.667	36	–	25	.590
South Alabama ‍‍‍	15	–	12	.556	35	–	20	.636
UT Arlington ‍‍‍	14	–	13	.519	32	–	28	.533
Georgia Southern ‍‍‍	12	–	15	.444	24	–	29	.453
Louisiana-Monroe ‍‍‍	11	–	16	.407	33	–	30	.524
Coastal Carolina ‍‍‍	10	–	16	.385	32	–	23	.582
Troy ‍‍‍	8	–	19	.296	20	–	34	.370
Appalachian State ‍‍‍	2	–	22	.083	14	–	34	.292
‡ – Tournament champion As of March 4, 2019; Rankings from NFCA

2017 West Coast Conference softball standings
	Conf.						Overall
Team	W		L		T	PCT	W		L		T	PCT
No. 20 BYU ‍†‍‍^{y}	14	–	1	–	0	.933	45	–	11	–	0	.804
Pacific ‍‍‍	10	–	5	–	0	.667	27	–	24	–	0	.529
San Diego ‍‍‍	8	–	7	–	0	.533	22	–	22	–	0	.500
Loyola Marymount ‍‍‍	6	–	9	–	0	.400	20	–	31	–	0	.392
Santa Clara ‍‍‍	4	–	11	–	0	.267	12	–	37	–	0	.245
Saint Mary's ‍‍‍	3	–	12	–	0	.200	17	–	31	–	0	.354
† – Conference champion y – Invited to the NCAA tournament As of May 18, 2017; Rankings from USA Today/NFCA Coaches

== National Invitational Softball Championship ==
Liberty Flames defeated the Lamar Cardinals in the inaugural championship; Tori Zavodny was named MVP for the series.

== Women's College World Series ==
The 2017 Women's College World Series began on June 1–4 in Oklahoma City.

First round
1	Florida	8^{(5)}
9	Texas A&M	0
13	LSU	2
5	UCLA	1
9	Texas A&M	2
5	UCLA	8
3	Oregon	1
6	Washington	3
15	Baylor	3
10	Oklahoma	6
3	Oregon	7
15	Baylor	4

Second round
1	Florida	7
13	LSU	0
6	Washington	1
5	UCLA	0
6	Washington	1
10	Oklahoma	3
13	LSU	1
3	Oregon	4

Semifinals
1	Florida	5	—
6	Washington	2	—
10	Oklahoma	4	—
3	Oregon	2	—

Finals
1	Florida	5	4	—
10	Oklahoma	7^{(17)}	5	—

== Season leaders ==
Batting

- Batting average: .487 – Kacie Burnett, Idaho State Bengals
- RBIs: 82 – DJ Sanders, Louisiana Ragin' Cajuns
- Home runs: 29 – DJ Sanders, Louisiana Ragin' Cajuns

Pitching

- Wins: 38-3 – Megan Good, James Madison Dukes
- ERA: 0.50 (14 ER/193.2 IP) – Kelly Barnhill, Florida Gators
- Strikeouts: 412 – Megan Betsa, Michigan Wolverines

== Records ==
NCAA Division I consecutive plate appearances reaching base: 26 – Amber Schisler, Campbell Fighting Camels; May 5–17, 2017

Freshman class single game RBIs: 10 – Braxton Burnside, Missouri Tigers; March 18, 2017

== Awards ==
- USA Softball Collegiate Player of the Year:

Kelly Barnhill, Florida Gators

- Honda Sports Award Softball:

Kelly Barnhill, Florida Gators

- espnW National Player of The Year:

Kelly Barnhill, Florida Gators

- Best Female College Athlete ESPY Award

Kelly Barnhill, Florida Gators

YEAR	W	L	GP	GS	CG	SHO	SV	IP	H	R	ER	BB	SO	ERA	WHIP
2017	26	4	37	30	17	13	3	193.2	79	22	14	39	359	0.50	0.61

- NFCA National Player of the Year:

Megan Good, James Madison Dukes

YEAR	W	L	GP	GS	CG	SHO	SV	IP	H	R	ER	BB	SO	ERA	WHIP
2017	38	3	44	39	22	14	1	244.2	125	33	22	35	271	0.63	0.65

YEAR	G	AB	R	H	BA	RBI	HR	3B	2B	TB	SLG	BB	SO	SB	SBA
2017	60	180	34	69	.383	58	12	0	11	116	.644%	28	12	0	0

- NFCA National Freshman of the Year:

Rachel Garcia, UCLA Bruins

YEAR	G	AB	R	H	BA	RBI	HR	3B	2B	TB	SLG	BB	SO	SB
2017	60	169	17	55	.325	29	8	0	12	91	.538%	21	14	0

YEAR	W	L	GP	GS	CG	SHO	SV	IP	H	R	ER	BB	SO	ERA	WHIP
2017	23	9	45	25	14	5	3	202.2	152	69	54	52	212	1.87	1.01

- NFCA Catcher of the Year:

Kendyl Lindaman, Minnesota

- NFCA Golden Shoe Award:

Elicia D'Orazio, Marshall

== All America Teams ==
The following players were members of the All-American Teams.

First Team

Position	Player	Class	School
P	Kelly Barnhill	SO.	Florida Gators
P	Sara Groenewegen	SR.	Minnesota Golden Gophers
P	Danielle O'Toole	SR.	Arizona Wildcats
C	Kendyl Lindaman	FR.	Minnesota Golden Gophers
1B	Jessie Harper	FR.	Arizona Wildcats
2B	Hannah Flippen	SR.	Utah Utes
3B	Jessica Warren	JR.	FSU Seminoles
SS	DJ Sanders	JR.	ULL Ragin' Cajuns
OF	Bailey Landry	SR.	LSU Tigers
OF	Aleah Craighton	JR.	ULL Ragin' Cajuns
OF	Amanda Lorenz	SO.	Florida Gators
UT	Megan Good	JR.	James Madison Dukes
UT	Sahvanna Jaquish	SR.	LSU Tigers
AT-L	Meghan Gregg	JR.	Tennessee Lady Vols
AT-L	Alexis Osorio	JR.	Alabama Crimson Tide
AT-L	Jessica Burroughs	SR.	FSU Seminoles
AT-L	Delanie Gourley	SR.	Florida Gators
AT-L	Nikki Udria	SR.	Oregon Ducks

Second Team

Position	Player	Class	School
P	Megan Kleist	SO.	Oregon Ducks
P	Megan Betsa	SR.	Michigan Wolverines
P	Randi Rupp	JR.	Texas State Bobcats
C	Jenavee Peres	JR.	San Diego State Aztecs
1B	Shay Knighten	SO.	Oklahoma Sooners
2B	Caleigh Clifton	SO.	Oklahoma Sooners
3B	Katiyana Mauga	SR.	Arizona Wildcats
SS	Morgan Zerkle	SR.	Marshall Thundering Herd
OF	Lea Foerster	JR.	Michigan State Spartans
OF	Morgan Klaevemann	JR.	FSU Seminoles
OF	Kelly Christner	SR.	Michigan Wolverines
UT	Sierra Hyland	SR.	Cal Poly Mustangs
UT	Kendra Lynch	SR.	North Carolina Tar Heels
AT-L	Rachel Garcia	FR.	UCLA Bruins
AT-L	Paige Parker	JR.	Oklahoma Sooners
AT-L	Mo Mercado	SR.	Arizona Wildcats
AT-L	Lindsey Cargill	SR.	Baylor Bears
AT-L	Emily Watson	JR.	Tulsa Hurricanes

Third Team

Position	Player	Class	School
P	Allie Walljasper	JR.	LSU Tigers
P	Kaylee Carlson	JR.	Auburn Tigers
P	McKenna Bull	SR.	BYU Cougars
P	Jordan Dixon	SR.	Marshall Thundering Herd
C	Chloe Miller	SR.	Wisconsin Badgers
1B	Alex Powers	SR.	FSU Seminoles
2B	Faith Canfield	SO.	Michigan Wolverines
3B	Riley Sartain	SO.	Texas A&M Aggies
SS	Lili Piper	SO.	Ohio State Buckeyes
OF	Cortni Emanuel	JR.	Georgia Bulldogs
OF	Nicole Evans	SR.	Illinois Fighting Illini
OF	Danica Mercado	SR.	Oregon Ducks
UT	Sydney O'Hara	SR.	Syracuse Orange
UT	Vanessa Shippy	JR.	Oklahoma State Cowgirls
AT-L	Emily Lochten	JR.	FAU Owls
AT-L	Kayli Kvistad	JR.	Florida Gators
AT-L	Katie Reed	SO.	Kentucky Wildcats
AT-L	Jessica Twaddle	SR.	Murray State Racers
AT-L	Ali Aguilar	SR.	Washington Huskies
