= Malveaux =

Malveaux may refer to:

- Chris Malveaux, American softball coach
- Julianne Malveaux (born 1953), college president and economist
- Kate Malveaux, American softball coach
- Kelly Malveaux (born 1976), football player
- Suzanne Malveaux (born 1966), journalist
- Suzette M. Malveaux (born 1966), lawyer and law professor

See also:

- Lee Boyd Malvo, convicted murderer (also known as John Lee Malvo) connected with the Beltway sniper attacks in the Washington Metropolitan Area over a 3-week period in October 2002.
- Lorne Malvo, a fictional character (portrayed by Billy Bob Thornton) and the primary antagonist of Season 1 of the FX television series Fargo
