= 2017 SEC softball tournament =

2017 Southeastern Conference softball tournament
- Teams: 12
- Format: Single-elimination tournament
- Finals site: Sherri Parker Lee Stadium; Knoxville, TN
- Champions: Ole Miss (1 title)
- Runner-up: LSU (11th title game)
- Winning coach: Mike Smith (1 title)
- MVP: Kaitlin Lee (Ole Miss)
- Television: SECN; ESPN2; ESPN

2017 Southeastern Conference softball standings
	Conf.				Overall
Team	W		L	PCT	W		L	PCT
No. 2 Florida ‍†‍‍^{y}	20	–	3	.870	58	–	10	.853
No. 13 Auburn ‍‍‍^{y}	17	–	7	.708	49	–	12	.803
No. 11 Tennessee ‍‍‍^{y}	16	–	7	.696	48	–	12	.800
No. 8 Texas A&M ‍‍‍^{y}	16	–	7	.696	47	–	13	.783
No. 12 Alabama ‍‍‍^{y}	12	–	11	.522	46	–	18	.719
No. 6 LSU ‍‍‍^{y}	12	–	12	.500	48	–	22	.686
No. 17 Kentucky ‍‍‍^{y}	12	–	12	.500	39	–	19	.672
No. 16 Ole Miss ‍‍‡‍^{y}	10	–	14	.417	43	–	20	.683
Mississippi State ‍‍‍^{y}	10	–	14	.417	36	–	22	.621
South Carolina ‍‍‍^{y}	8	–	15	.348	34	–	25	.576
Missouri ‍‍‍^{y}	7	–	16	.304	29	–	28	.509
Arkansas ‍‍‍^{y}	7	–	17	.292	31	–	24	.564
No. 25 Georgia ‍‍‍^{y}	6	–	18	.250	35	–	23	.603
† – Conference champion ‡ – Tournament champion y – Invited to the NCAA tournament As of May 31, 2017; Rankings from NFCA

The 2017 SEC softball tournament was held at Sherri Parker Lee Stadium on the campus of University of Tennessee in Knoxville, Tennessee, from May 10 through May 13, 2017. The tournament will earn the Southeastern Conference's automatic bid to the 2017 NCAA Division I softball tournament. The Championship game was broadcast on ESPN and the semifinals were broadcast on ESPNU, while all other SEC tournament games will be live on the SEC Network.

== Tournament ==
1st Round; May 10th SECN
8	#19 Ole Miss	2
9	Mississippi State	1
5	#15 Alabama	4
12	Arkansas	1
7	#18 Kentucky	7
10	#24 South Carolina	3
6	#21 LSU	6
11	Missouri	5

Quarterfinals; May 11th SECN
1	#1 Florida	0
8	#19 Ole Miss	2
4	#11 Texas A&M	1
5	#15 Alabama	2^{(10)}
2	#7 Auburn	2
7	#18 Kentucky	0
3	#9 Tennessee	2
6	#21 LSU	6

Semifinals; May 13th SEC, ESPN2
8	#19 Ole Miss	4
5	#15 Alabama	1
2	#7 Auburn	0
6	#21 LSU	6

Finals; May 13th ESPN
8	#19 Ole Miss	5
6	#21 LSU	1

- Only the top 12 teams are able to participate, therefore, Georgia was not eligible to play.
- Vanderbilt does not sponsor a softball team.

== Schedule ==
Game	Time*	Matchup^{#}	Television	TV Announcers	Radio Announcers	Attendance
First Round – Wednesday, May 10
1	11:00 a.m.	#5 Alabama vs. #12 Arkansas	SEC Network	Adam Amin, Amanda Scarborough, & Laura Rutledge	Mike Coulter, Dave Shook, & Paul Roper	–
2	1:30 p.m.	#8 Ole Miss vs. #9 Mississippi State	SEC Network	Adam Amin, Amanda Scarborough, & Laura Rutledge	Dave Shook, Paul Roper, & Mike Coulter	–
3	4:00 p.m.	#7 Kentucky vs. #10 South Carolina	SEC Network	Beth Mowins, Michele Smith, & Holly Rowe	Mike Coulter, Paul Roper, & Dave Shook	2,171
4	6:30 p.m.	#6 LSU vs. #11 Missouri	SEC Network	Beth Mowins, Michele Smith, & Holly Rowe	Paul Roper, Dave Shook, & Mike Coulter	2,171
Quarterfinals – Thursday, May 11
5	11:00 a.m.	#4 Texas A&M vs. #5 Alabama	SEC Network	Adam Amin, Amanda Scarborough, & Laura Rutledge	Dave Shook, Mike Coulter, & Paul Roper	–
6	2:30 p.m.	#1 Florida vs. #8 Ole Miss	SEC Network	Adam Amin, Amanda Scarborough, & Laura Rutledge	Mike Coulter, Paul Roper, & Dave Shook	–
7	5:00 p.m.	#2 Auburn vs. #7 Kentucky	SEC Network	Beth Mowins, Michele Smith, & Holly Rowe	Dave Shook, Paul Roper, & Mike Coulter	2,448
8	7:30 p.m.	#3 Tennessee vs. #6 LSU	SEC Network	Beth Mowins, Michele Smith, & Holly Rowe	Paul Roper, Mike Coulter, & Dave Shook	2,448
Semifinals – Saturday, May 13
9	10:00 a.m.	#8 Ole Miss vs. #5 Alabama	SEC	Beth Mowins, Amanda Scarborough, Michele Smith, & Laura Rutledge	Dave Shook, Paul Roper, & Mike Coulter	–
10	1:00 p.m.	#2 Auburn vs. #6 LSU	ESPN2	Beth Mowins, Amanda Scarborough, Michele Smith, & Laura Rutledge	Paul Roper, Dave Shook, & Mike Coulter	–
Championship – Saturday, May 13
11	7:00 p.m.	#8 Ole Miss vs. #6 LSU	ESPN	Beth Mowins, Amanda Scarborough, Michele Smith, & Laura Rutledge	Paul Roper, Dave Shook, & Mike Coulter	2,248
*Game times in CDT. # – Rankings denote tournament seed.

- Due to rain the semifinals were delayed to May 13 and moved from ESPNU to SEC Network and ESPN2.

== See also ==
- 2017 Alabama Crimson Tide softball team
- 2017 Auburn Tigers softball team
