= 2017 Louisiana–Lafayette Ragin' Cajuns softball team =

American college softball season

2017 Louisiana–Lafayette Ragin' Cajuns softball

Baton Rouge Regionals appearance Sun Belt Conference tournament champions Sun Belt Conference regular-season champions

Mardi Gras Invitational Champions Ragin' Cajun Invitational Champions
- Conference: Sun Belt Conference

Ranking
- Coaches: No. 19
- Record: 47-8 (23-1 SBC)
- Head coach: Michael Lotief (17th season)
- Assistant coaches: Chris Malveaux; Kate Malveaux
- Home stadium: Lamson Park

2017 Sun Belt Conference softball standings
	Conf.				Overall
Team	W		L	PCT	W		L	PCT
No. 19 Louisiana–Lafayette ‍†‍‡‍^{y}	23	–	1	.958	47	–	8	.855
RV Texas State ‍‍‍^{y}	18	–	8	.692	42	–	17	.712
Georgia State ‍‍‍^{y}	18	–	9	.667	36	–	25	.590
South Alabama ‍‍‍	15	–	12	.556	35	–	20	.636
UT Arlington ‍‍‍	14	–	13	.519	32	–	28	.533
Georgia Southern ‍‍‍	12	–	15	.444	24	–	29	.453
Louisiana-Monroe ‍‍‍	11	–	16	.407	33	–	30	.524
Coastal Carolina ‍‍‍	10	–	16	.385	32	–	23	.582
Troy ‍‍‍	8	–	19	.296	20	–	34	.370
Appalachian State ‍‍‍	2	–	22	.083	14	–	34	.292
‡ – Tournament champion As of March 4, 2019; Rankings from NFCA

The 2017 Louisiana–Lafayette Ragin' Cajuns softball team represented the University of Louisiana at Lafayette in the 2017 NCAA Division I softball season. The Ragin' Cajuns play their home games at Lamson Park. This would also be the last season that a Lotief would be the head coach of the Ragin' Cajuns. This came after the university fired Lotief, both Malveauxs, Director of Operations Kelsey Vincent, and one manager, Sara Corbello on November 1, 2017 due to allegations of physically and verbal abuse to his players and for laying a finger on the university's strength coach. The Ragin' Cajuns softball players strongly disagreed with his firing. Several even transferred schools with most making a pack that "if they couldn't play with Lotief, they wouldn't play at all." However, most of the team remained and competed in 2018. Nearly a year later, Lotief filed a lawsuit against the university claiming that they fired him over retaliation from Lotief claiming that the university violated NCAA Title IX laws which state that women's sports must be treated the same as their male counterpart. In the lawsuit, Lotief called University President Joseph E. Savoie, Athletic Director Bryan Maggard, and Assistant Athletic Director Dr. Jessica Leger as the defendants.

== Preseason ==
=== Sun Belt Conference Coaches Poll ===
The Sun Belt Conference Coaches Poll was released on January 30, 2017. Louisiana-Lafayette was picked to finish first in the Sun Belt Conference with 100 votes and 10 first place votes, every first place vote available.

Coaches poll
Predicted finish	Team	Votes (1st place)
1	Louisiana-Lafayette	100 (10)
2	Texas State	87
3	South Alabama	80
4	Georgia State	68
5	Georgia Southern	55
6	Troy	44
7	UT Arlington	41
8	Coastal Carolina	32
9	Louisiana-Monroe	30
10	Appalachian State	13

=== Preseason All-Sun Belt team ===
- Ivie Drake (GSU, JR, Catcher)
- Mandy Blackwell (GSU, SR, 1st Base)
- Haley Hayden (ULL, SR, 2nd Base)
- Kaleigh Todd (USA, JR, 2nd Base)
- Sandra Mendoza (UTA, JR, 2nd Base)
- DJ Sanders (ULL, JR, Shortstop)
- Corrina Liscano (TXST, SR, 3rd Base)
- Taty Forbes (CCU, SO, Outfield)
- Aleah Craighton (ULL, JR, Outfield)
- Rochelle Roberts (ULM, SR, Outfield)
- Megan Litumbe (GSU, R-JR, Designated Player)
- Dixie Raley (GASO, SO, Pitcher)
- Alex Stewart (ULL, SR, Pitcher)
- Devin Brown (USA, JR, Pitcher)
- Randi Rupp (TXST, JR, Pitcher)

==== Preseason Player of the Year ====
- Aleah Craighton (ULL, JR, Outfield)'

== Roster ==
2017 Louisiana-Lafayette Ragin' Cajuns roster
Pitchers: 5 Kirsten Pruett - Freshman; 9 Summer Ellyson - Redshirt Freshman; 10 Alison Deville - Sophomore; 11 Kylee Jo Trahan - Junior; 12 Makenzie Carpenter - Freshman; 16 Alyssa Denham - Freshman; 18 Alex Stewart - Senior; 22 Samantha Bradley - Freshman; 24 Macey Smith - Senior; 32 Victoria Brown - Senior; Catchers: 19 Lexie Comeaux - Sophomore; 23 Brittany Nollkamper - Sophomore; 26 Allie Medlin - Sophomore; 33 Shae Schreckengost - Freshman; 34 Miranda Grotenhuis - Sophomore; Designated Players: 99 Daniella Chavez - Junior	Infielders: 4 Kassidy Zeringue - Senior; 7 Alaina Guarino - Redshirt Freshman; 31 Corin Voinche - Senior; 35 Haley Hayden - Senior; 37 DJ Sanders - Junior; 39 Kara Gremillion - Sophomore; 44 Kourtney Gremillion - Freshman; Outfielders: 1 Chelsea Lotief - Redshirt Freshman; 2 Jaime Landry - Sophomore; 3 Taylor Terrio - Senior; 6 Shannon Theriot - Redshirt Freshman; 8 Aleah Craighton - Junior; 15 Aeriyl Mass - Freshman; 20 Kendall Smith - Senior; 27 Sarah Arceneaux - Senior; 29 Beth Ashley - Redshirt Freshman; 30 Kelly Martinez - Junior; 42 Abby Sterling - Sophomore

=== Coaching staff ===
2017 Louisiana-Lafayette Ragin' Cajuns coaching staff
- Michael Lotief – Head coach – 17th year
- Chris Malveaux – Assistant head coach – 5th year
- Kate Malveaux – Assistant head coach & video director – 1st year
- Kelsey Vincent – Director of operations (pre-firing) – 1st year
- Denee Simon – Director of operations (post-firing) – 1st year
- Shellie Landry – Manager

== Schedule and results ==
Legend
	Louisiana-Lafayette win
	Louisiana-Lafayette loss
	Postponement/Cancellation
**Bold**	Louisiana team member

2017 Louisiana-Lafayette Ragin' Cajuns Softball Game Log
Regular season (42-6)

February (11-4)
Date	Opponent	Rank	Site/stadium	Score	Win	Loss	Save	TV	Attendance	Overall record	SBC record
Louisiana Classics
Feb. 10	DePaul	No. 11	Lamson Park • Lafayette, LA	**W** 9-1 (6 inn)	**Stewart** (1-0)	Landwehrmier (0-1)	None	Ragin' Cajuns Digital Network		1-0	
Feb. 10	Iowa State	No. 11	Lamson Park • Lafayette, LA	**W** 9-1	**Denham** (1-0)	Sanders (0-1)	None	Ragin' Cajuns Digital Network	2,022	2-0	
Feb. 11	DePaul	No. 11	Lamson Park • Lafayette, LA	**W** 4-3	**Stewart** (2-0)	Garcia (1-1)	None	Ragin' Cajuns Digital Network		3-0	
Feb. 11	Ball State	No. 11	Lamson Park • Lafayette, LA	**W** 7-4	**Smith** (1-0)	Miles (0-1)	None	Ragin' Cajuns Digital Network	2,237	4-0	
Feb. 12	Southern Miss	No. 11	Lamson Park • Lafayette, LA	**L** 3-4	Johnson (1-0)	**Denham** (1-1)	None	Ragin' Cajuns Digital Network		4-1	
Feb. 12	Southern Miss	No. 11	Lamson Park • Lafayette, LA	**L** 3-5	Crowson (3-0)	**Stewart** (2-1)	None	Ragin' Cajuns Digital Network	2,175	4-2	
Feb. 18	No. 4 Alabama	No. 18	Lamson Park • Lafayette, LA	**L** 0-3	Osorio (4-0)	**Smith** (1-1)	None	Ragin' Cajuns Digital Network		4-3	
Feb. 18	No. 4 Alabama	No. 18	Lamson Park • Lafayette, LA	**W** 11-2 (6 inn)	**Stewart** (3-1)	Moore (1-1)	None	Ragin' Cajuns Digital Network	2,210	5-3	
Feb. 19	No. 4 Alabama	No. 18	Lamson Park • Lafayette, LA	**W** 7-0	**Denham** (2-1)	Osorio (4-1)	None	Ragin' Cajuns Digital Network	2,079	6-3	
Mardi Gras Invitational
Feb. 23	Drake	No. 16	Lamson Park • Lafayette, LA	**W** 9-3	**Denham** (3-1)	Newman (5-3)	None	Ragin' Cajuns Digital Network		7-3	
Feb. 23	Bowling Green	No. 16	Lamson Park • Lafayette, LA	**W** 14-2 (5 inn)	**Stewart** (4-1)	Combs (1-2)	None	Ragin' Cajuns Digital Network	2,024	8-3	
Feb. 24	Dartmouth	No. 16	Lamson Park • Lafayette, LA	**W** 12-5	**Ellyson** (1-0)	Ethridge (0-1)	**Smith** (1)	Ragin' Cajuns Digital Network	1,917	9-3	
Feb. 25	Maryland	No. 16	Lamson Park • Lafayette, LA	**W** 3-0	**Denham** (4-1)	Martin (1-3)	None	Ragin' Cajuns Digital Network	1,939	10-3	
Feb. 26	Bradley	No. 16	Lamson Park • Lafayette, LA	**L** 1-2	Hull (5-1)	**Stewart** (4-2)	None	Ragin' Cajuns Digital Network		10-4	
Feb. 26	Mississippi Valley State	No. 16	Lamson Park • Lafayette, LA	**W** 19-0 (5 inn)	**Smith** (2-1)	Ellis (0-1)	None	Ragin' Cajuns Digital Network	2,010	11-4	

March (12-1)
Date	Opponent	Rank	Site/stadium	Score	Win	Loss	Save	TV	Attendance	Overall record	SBC record
Ragin' Cajuns Invitational
Mar. 3	Alcorn State	No. 18	Lamson Park • Lafayette, LA	**W** 8-0 (5 inn)	**Smith** (3-1)	Castillo (1-3)	None	Ragin' Cajuns Digital Network		12-4	
Mar. 3	North Dakota State	No. 18	Lamson Park • Lafayette, LA	**W** 8-2	**Denham** (5-1)	Sertic (3-9)	None	Ragin' Cajuns Digital Network	1,841	13-4	
Mar. 4	North Dakota State	No. 18	Lamson Park • Lafayette, LA	**W** 15-0 (5 inn)	**Stewart** (5-2)	Leddy (1-4)	None	Ragin' Cajuns Digital Network		14-4	
Mar. 4	Texas A&M-Corpus Christi	No. 18	Lamson Park • Lafayette, LA	**W** 8-0 (6 inn)	**Stewart** (6-2)	Carter (4-6)	None	Ragin' Cajuns Digital Network	1,915	15-4	
Mar. 5	Texas A&M-Corpus Christi	No. 18	Lamson Park • Lafayette, LA	**W** 18-0 (5 inn)	**Denham** (6-1)	Carter (4-7)	None	Ragin' Cajuns Digital Network		16-4	
Mar. 5	Alcorn State	No. 18	Lamson Park • Lafayette, LA	**W** 14-4 (5 inn)	**Stewart** (7-2)	Dorsey (0-4)	None	Ragin' Cajuns Digital Network	1,799	17-4	
Mar. 9	No. 15 Baylor	No. 18	Lamson Park • Lafayette, LA	**L** 4-5	Selman (11-2)	**Stewart** (7-3)	None	Ragin' Cajuns Digital Network	1,861	17-5	
Mar. 11	at Appalachian State	No. 18	Sywassink/Lloyd Family Stadium • Boone, NC	Series cancelled due to inclement weather							
Mar. 11	at Appalachian State	No. 18	Sywassink/Lloyd Family Stadium • Boone, NC	Series cancelled due to inclement weather							
Mar. 12	at Appalachian State	No. 18	Sywassink/Lloyd Family Stadium • Boone, NC	Series cancelled due to inclement weather							
Mar. 18	UT Arlington	No. 18	Lamson Park • Lafayette, LA	**W** 6-5	**Stewart** (8-3)	Clakley (11-6)	None	Ragin' Cajuns Digital Network		18-5	1-0
Mar. 18	UT Arlington	No. 18	Lamson Park • Lafayette, LA	**W** 6-2	**Denham** (7-1)	Denson (1-6)	None	Ragin' Cajuns Digital Network	2,061	19-5	2-0
Mar. 19	UT Arlington	No. 18	Lamson Park • Lafayette, LA	**W** 11-2 (6 inn)	**Denham** (8-1)	Clakley (11-7)	None	Ragin' Cajuns Digital Network	1,908	20-5	3-0
Mar. 25	at South Alabama	No. 17	Jaguar Field • Mobile, AL	**W** 8-3	**Denham** (9-1)	Brown (9-5)	None	None		21-5	4-0
Mar. 25	at South Alabama	No. 17	Jaguar Field • Mobile, AL	**W** 4-2	**Stewart** (9-3)	Vicknair (9-5)	None	None	687	22-5	5-0
Mar. 26	at South Alabama	No. 17	Jaguar Field • Mobile, AL	**W** 9-4	**Stewart** (10-3)	Brown (9-6)	None	None	591	23-5	6-0

April (16-1)
Date	Opponent	Rank	Site/stadium	Score	Win	Loss	Save	TV	Attendance	Overall record	SBC record
Apr. 1	at Georgia Southern	No. 17	Eagles Field at GS Softball Complex • Statesboro, GA	**W** 15-0 (5 inn)	**Stewart** (11-3)	Raley (9-12)	None	None		24-5	7-0
Apr. 1	at Georgia Southern	No. 17	Eagles Field at GS Softball Complex • Statesboro, GA	**W** 10-2 (6 inn)	**Denham** (10-1)	Camp (5-6)	None	None	137	25-5	8-0
Apr. 2	at Georgia Southern	No. 17	Eagles Field at GS Softball Complex • Statesboro, GA	**W** 6-2	**Stewart** (12-3)	Raley (9-13)	**Denham** (1)	None	126	26-5	9-0
Apr. 8	Troy	No. 16	Lamson Park • Lafayette, LA	**W** 3-1	**Denham** (11-1)	Graves (7-6)	None	Ragin' Cajuns Digital Network		27-5	10-0
Apr. 8	Troy	No. 16	Lamson Park • Lafayette, LA	**W** 11-0 (5 inn)	**Stewart** (13-3)	Willis (1-2)	None	Ragin' Cajuns Digital Network	2,088	28-5	11-0
Apr. 9	Troy	No. 16	Lamson Park • Lafayette, LA	**W** 11-0 (5 inn)	**Stewart** (14-3)	Rigney-Brown (6-13)	None	Ragin' Cajuns Digital Network	2,474	29-5	12-0
Apr. 11	Southeastern Louisiana	No. 17	Lamson Park • Lafayette, LA	**W** 13-5 (5 inn)	**Denham** (12-1)	VanHemelryck (0-3)	None	Ragin' Cajuns Digital Network	1,865	30-5	
Apr. 14	at Texas State	No. 17	Bobcat Softball Stadium • San Marcos, TX	**W** 8-1	**Denham** (13-1)	Rupp (20-6)	None	None		31-5	13-0
Apr. 14	at Texas State	No. 17	Bobcat Softball Stadium • San Marcos, TX	**W** 12-4 (6 inn)	**Stewart** (15-3)	Williams (5-3)	None	None	1,013	32-5	14-0
Apr. 15	at Texas State	No. 17	Bobcat Softball Stadium • San Marcos, TX	**L** 1-2 (8 inn)	Williams (6-3)	**Denham** (13-2)	None	None	784	32-6	14-1
Apr. 19	at No. 4 Texas A&M	No. 17	Aggie Softball Complex • College Station, TX	**W** 11-9	**Denham** (14-2)	Show (14-3)	None	SEC Network+	953	33-6	
Apr. 22	Georgia State	No. 17	Lamson Park • Lafayette, LA	**W** 19-4 (5 inn)	**Smith** (4-1)	Worsham (4-2)	None	Ragin' Cajuns Digital Network		34-6	15-1
Apr. 22	Georgia State	No. 17	Lamson Park • Lafayette, LA	**W** 7-1	**Stewart** (16-3)	Jennings (14-9)	None	Ragin' Cajuns Digital Network	1,740	35-6	16-1
Apr. 23	Georgia State	No. 17	Lamson Park • Lafayette, LA	**W** 14-6 (5 inn)	**Stewart** (17-3)	Jennings (14-10)	None	Ragin' Cajuns Digital Network	2,058	36-6	17-1
Apr. 29	Coastal Carolina	No. 16	Lamson Park • Lafayette, LA	**W** 9-0 (5 inn)	**Stewart** (18-3)	Rahach (12-8)	None	Ragin' Cajuns Digital Network		37-6	18-1
Apr. 29	Coastal Carolina	No. 16	Lamson Park • Lafayette, LA	**W** 13-4 (5 inn)	**Stewart** (19-3)	Guillette (11-9)	None	Ragin' Cajuns Digital Network	1,750	38-6	19-1
Apr. 30	Coastal Carolina	No. 16	Lamson Park • Lafayette, LA	**W** 8-0 (5 inn)	**Stewart** (20-3)	Rahach (12-9)	None	Ragin' Cajuns Digital Network	1,725	39-6	20-1

May (3-0)
Date	Opponent	Rank	Site/stadium	Score	Win	Loss	Save	TV	Attendance	Overall record	SBC record
May 6	at Louisiana-Monroe	No. 15	Geo-Surfaces Field at the ULM Softball Complex • Monroe, LA	**W** 4-0	**Stewart** (21-3)	Porter (6-6)	None	None		40-6	21-1
May 6	at Louisiana-Monroe	No. 15	Geo-Surfaces Field at the ULM Softball Complex • Monroe, LA	**W** 6-5	**Denham** (15-2)	Wader (1-2)	**Stewart** (1)	None	271	41-6	22-1
May 7	at Louisiana-Monroe	No. 15	Geo-Surfaces Field at the ULM Softball Complex • Monroe, LA	**W** 8-0 (6 inn)	**Stewart** (22-3)	Coyne (16-13)	None	None	187	42-6	23-1

Post-Season (5-2)

SBC tournament (3-0)
Date	Opponent	Seed/rank	Site/stadium	Score	Win	Loss	Save	TV	Attendance	Overall record	SBC record
May 11	vs. South Alabama (Quarterfinals)	No. 14	Troy Softball Complex • Troy, AL	**W** 6-0	**Stewart** (23-3)	Vicknair (14-11)	None	ESPN3	476	43-6	
May 12	vs. Texas State (Semifinals)	No. 14	Troy Softball Complex • Troy, AL	**W** 5-2	**Stewart** (43-3)	Vicknair (14-11)	None	ESPN3	570	44-6	
May 13	vs. Texas State (Championship)	No. 14	Troy Softball Complex • Troy, AL	**W** 12-0 (5 inn)	**Stewart** (25-3)	Williams (6-4)	None	ESPN3	679	45-6	

NCAA tournament (2-2)
Date	Opponent	Seed/rank	Site/stadium	Score	Win	Loss	Save	TV	Attendance	Overall record	SBC record
Baton Rouge Regionals
May 19	vs. McNeese State	No. 14	Tiger Park • Baton Rouge, LA	**W** 6-0	**Stewart** (26-3)	Corbello (11-4)	None	ESPN3	1,993	46-6	
May 20	vs. No. 18 LSU	No. 14	Tiger Park • Baton Rouge, LA	**W** 4-2	**Stewart** (27-3)	Walljasper (16-5)	None	ESPN3	2,358	47-6	
May 21	vs. No. 18 LSU	No. 14	Tiger Park • Baton Rouge, LA	**L** 1-6	Hoover (13-6)	**Stewart** (27-4)	None	ESPN3	1,997	47-7	
May 22	vs. No. 18 LSU	No. 14	Tiger Park • Baton Rouge, LA	**L** 1-5	Hoover (14-6)	**Stewart** (27-5)	None	ESPN3	2,169	47-8	

Schedule source:

== Baton Rouge Regional ==
Baton Rouge Regional Teams
(1) LSU Tigers	(2) Louisiana-Lafayette Ragin' Cajuns	(3) McNeese State Cowgirls	(4) Fairfield Stags

First Round
13	LSU	2
Fairfield	1
McNeese State	0
Louisiana-Lafayette	6
Lower round 1
Fairfield	2
McNeese State	6

Semi-Finals
13	LSU	2
Louisiana-Lafayette	4
Lower final
13	LSU	10
McNeese State	1

Finals
Louisiana-Lafayette	1	1
13	LSU	6	5
