= 2017 Florida Gators softball team =

American college softball season

2017 Florida Gators softball

Gainesville Super Regional champion Gainesville Regional champion SEC East Division champion SEC Regular Season champion

Women's College World Series, runner-up
- Conference: Southeastern Conference
- East
- Record: 58–10 (20-3 SEC)
- Head coach: Tim Walton (12th season)
- Home stadium: Katie Seashole Pressly Softball Stadium

2017 Southeastern Conference softball standings
	Conf.				Overall
Team	W		L	PCT	W		L	PCT
No. 2 Florida ‍†‍‍^{y}	20	–	3	.870	58	–	10	.853
No. 13 Auburn ‍‍‍^{y}	17	–	7	.708	49	–	12	.803
No. 11 Tennessee ‍‍‍^{y}	16	–	7	.696	48	–	12	.800
No. 8 Texas A&M ‍‍‍^{y}	16	–	7	.696	47	–	13	.783
No. 12 Alabama ‍‍‍^{y}	12	–	11	.522	46	–	18	.719
No. 6 LSU ‍‍‍^{y}	12	–	12	.500	48	–	22	.686
No. 17 Kentucky ‍‍‍^{y}	12	–	12	.500	39	–	19	.672
No. 16 Ole Miss ‍‍‡‍^{y}	10	–	14	.417	43	–	20	.683
Mississippi State ‍‍‍^{y}	10	–	14	.417	36	–	22	.621
South Carolina ‍‍‍^{y}	8	–	15	.348	34	–	25	.576
Missouri ‍‍‍^{y}	7	–	16	.304	29	–	28	.509
Arkansas ‍‍‍^{y}	7	–	17	.292	31	–	24	.564
No. 25 Georgia ‍‍‍^{y}	6	–	18	.250	35	–	23	.603
† – Conference champion ‡ – Tournament champion y – Invited to the NCAA tournament As of May 31, 2017; Rankings from NFCA

The 2017 Florida Gators softball team represented the University of Florida in the 2017 NCAA Division I softball season. The Gators were coached by Tim Walton, who led his twelfth season. The Gators finished with a record of 56–13.

The Gators were invited to the 2017 NCAA Division I Softball Tournament, where they won the Gainesville Regional and Super Regional and then completed a run to the title game of the Women's College World Series, their eighth appearance in Oklahoma City, where they fell to champion Oklahoma.

== Personnel ==
=== Roster ===
2017 Florida Gators roster
Pitchers: 11 - Kelly Barnhill - Sophomore; 33 - Delanie Gourley - Senior; 56 - Katie Chronister - Freshman; Catchers: 14 - Jordan Roberts - Freshman; 28 - Brooke Clemens - Sophomore; 52 - Justine McLean - Senior	Infielders: 20 - Theresa Swertfager - Sophomore; 21 - Kayli Kvistad - Junior; 23 - Nicole DeWitt - Junior; 25 - Janell Wheaton - Junior; 74 - Sophia Reynoso - (redshirt) Freshman; Outfielders: 18 - Amanda Lorenz - Sophomore; 19 - Chelsea Herndon - Senior; 47 - Lily Mann - Sophomore; 77 - Jacqui Switzer - Freshman	Utility: 00 - Alex Voss - Sophomore; 8 - Aleshia Ocasio - Junior; 9 - Jaimie Hoover - Freshman

=== Coaches ===
2017 Florida Gators softball coaching staff
- Tim Walton - Head coach - 12th season
- Jennifer Rocha - Assistant coach - 12th season
- Sharonda McDonald - Assistant coach - 2nd season
- Cody Dent - Volunteer Assistant Coach - 1st season

== Schedule ==
Legend
	Florida win
	Florida loss
*	Non-Conference game

2017 Florida Gators softball game log
Regular season

February
Date	Opponent	Site/stadium	Score	Overall record	SEC Record
Feb 10	vs Illinois State*	USF Softball Stadium • Tampa, FL (USF-Wilson DeMarini Tournament)	W 9–0^{5}	1–0	
Feb 11	vs St. John's*	USF Softball Stadium • Tampa, FL (USF-Wilson DeMarini Tournament)	W 5–2	2–0	
Feb 11	vs Michigan*	USF Softball Stadium • Tampa, FL (USF-Wilson DeMarini Tournament)	W 2–1^{10}	3–0	
Feb 12	vs Delaware*	USF Softball Stadium • Tampa, FL (USF-Wilson DeMarini Tournament)	W 9–0^{5}	4–0	
Feb 12	at South Florida*	USF Softball Stadium • Tampa, FL (USF-Wilson DeMarini Tournament)	W 8–0^{6}	5–0	
Feb 15	at Jacksonville*	JU Softball Complex • Jacksonville, FL	W 6–0	6–0	
Feb 17	Florida A&M*	Katie Seashole Pressly Softball Stadium • Gainesville, FL	W 8–1	7–0	
Feb 17	Northwestern State*	Katie Seashole Pressly Softball Stadium • Gainesville, FL (Aquafina Invitational)	W 9–3	8–0	
Feb 18	Maryland*	Katie Seashole Pressly Softball Stadium • Gainesville, FL (Aquafina Invitational)	L 2–4	8–1	
Feb 18	Northwestern State*	Katie Seashole Pressly Softball Stadium • Gainesville, FL (Aquafina Invitational)	W 10–0	9–1	
Feb 19	FIU*	Katie Seashole Pressly Softball Stadium • Gainesville, FL (Aquafina Invitational)	W 5–0	10–1	
Feb 24	vs Syracuse*	ESPN Wide World of Sports Complex • Orlando, FL (Citrus Classic)	W 2–0	11–1	
Feb 24	vs Fordham*	ESPN Wide World of Sports Complex • Orlando, FL (Citrus Classic)	W 4–0	12–1	
Feb 25	vs Liberty*	ESPN Wide World of Sports Complex • Orlando, FL (Citrus Classic)	W 2–1	13–1	
Feb 25	vs Elon*	ESPN Wide World of Sports Complex • Orlando, FL (Citrus Classic)	W 11–0	14–1	
Feb 26	vs Lehigh*	ESPN Wide World of Sports Complex • Orlando, FL (Citrus Classic)	W 5–0	15–1	

March
Date	Opponent	Site/stadium	Score	Overall record	SEC Record
Mar 2	vs Iowa*	Anderson Family Field • Fullerton, CA (Judi Garman Classic)	W 8–0	16–1	
Mar 2	vs Long Beach State*	Anderson Family Field • Fullerton, CA (Judi Garman Classic)	W 17–0	17–1	
Mar 3	vs California*	Anderson Family Field • Fullerton, CA (Judi Garman Classic)	W 4–0	18–1	
Mar 3	vs UCLA*	Anderson Family Field • Fullerton, CA (Judi Garman Classic)	W 9–4	19–1	
Mar 4	vs Northwestern*	Anderson Family Field • Fullerton, CA (Judi Garman Classic)	W 7–4	20–1	
Mar 11	Missouri	Katie Seashole Pressly Softball Stadium • Gainesville, FL	W 6–0	21–1	1–0
Mar 12	Missouri	Katie Seashole Pressly Softball Stadium • Gainesville, FL	W 1–0	22–1	2–0
Mar 15	North Dakota State*	Katie Seashole Pressly Softball Stadium • Gainesville, FL	W 13–0	23–1	
Mar 17	at South Carolina	Carolina Softball Stadium at Beckham Field • Columbia, SC	W 6–0	24–1	3–0
Mar 18	at South Carolina	Carolina Softball Stadium at Beckham Field • Columbia, SC	W 13–1	25–1	4–0
Mar 19	at South Carolina	Carolina Softball Stadium at Beckham Field • Columbia, SC	W 10–0	26–1	5–0
Mar 22	South Florida*	Katie Seashole Pressly Softball Stadium • Gainesville, FL	W 8–0	27–1	
Mar 25	Auburn	Katie Seashole Pressly Softball Stadium • Gainesville, FL	W 4–3	28–1	6–0
Mar 26	Auburn	Katie Seashole Pressly Softball Stadium • Gainesville, FL	W 7–0	29–1	7–0
Mar 27	Auburn	Katie Seashole Pressly Softball Stadium • Gainesville, FL	L 0–1	29–2	7–1
Mar 29	Bethune–Cookman*	Katie Seashole Pressly Softball Stadium • Gainesville, FL	W 15–7	30–2	
Mar 31	at Arkansas	Bogle Park • Fayetteville, AR	W 6–1	31–2	8–1

April
Date	Opponent	Site/stadium	Score	Overall record	SEC Record
Apr 1	at Arkansas	Bogle Park • Fayetteville, AR	W 8–0	32–2	9–1
Apr 2	at Arkansas	Bogle Park • Fayetteville, AR	W 6–1	33–2	10–1
Apr 5	North Florida*	Katie Seashole Pressly Softball Stadium • Gainesville, FL	W 5–1	34–2	
Apr 8	Georgia	Katie Seashole Pressly Softball Stadium • Gainesville, FL	W 5–0	35–2	11–1
Apr 9	Georgia	Katie Seashole Pressly Softball Stadium • Gainesville, FL	W 4–1	36–2	12–1
Apr 10	Georgia	Katie Seashole Pressly Softball Stadium • Gainesville, FL	W 3–0	37–2	13–1
Apr 12	Florida State*	Katie Seashole Pressly Softball Stadium • Gainesville, FL	W 1–0	38–2	
Apr 14	at Kentucky	John Cropp Stadium • Lexington, KY	W 4–0	39–2	14–1
Apr 15	at Kentucky	John Cropp Stadium • Lexington, KY	L 1–5	39–3	14–2
Apr 16	at Kentucky	John Cropp Stadium • Lexington, KY	W 2–0	40–3	15–2
Apr 19	UCF*	Katie Seashole Pressly Softball Stadium • Gainesville, FL	W 9–1	41–3	
Apr 21	Ole Miss	Katie Seashole Pressly Softball Stadium • Gainesville, FL	W 2–0	42–3	16–2
Apr 22	Ole Miss	Katie Seashole Pressly Softball Stadium • Gainesville, FL	W 3–0	43–3	17–2
Apr 23	Ole Miss	Katie Seashole Pressly Softball Stadium • Gainesville, FL	W 5–0	44–3	18–2
Apr 28	at Tennessee	Sherri Parker Lee Stadium • Knoxville, TN	W 5–0	45–3	19–2
Apr 29	at Tennessee	Sherri Parker Lee Stadium • Knoxville, TN	W 9–0	46–3	20–2
Apr 30	at Tennessee	Sherri Parker Lee Stadium • Knoxville, TN	L 1–5	46–4	20–3

May
Date	Opponent	Site/stadium	Score	Overall record	SEC Record
May 3	at Florida State*	JoAnne Graf Field at the Seminole Softball Complex • Tallahassee, FL	L 1–3	46–5	
May 5	North Texas*	Katie Seashole Pressly Softball Stadium • Gainesville, FL	W 8–0	47–5	
May 6	North Texas*	Katie Seashole Pressly Softball Stadium • Gainesville, FL	W 9–0	48–5	
May 7	North Texas*	Katie Seashole Pressly Softball Stadium • Gainesville, FL	W 8–1	49–5	
May 7	Florida A&M*	Katie Seashole Pressly Softball Stadium • Gainesville, FL	W 7–0	50–5	

Postseason

SEC Tournament
Date	Opponent	Rank (Seed)	Site/stadium	Score	Overall record	SECT record
May 11	(8) Ole Miss	(1)	Sherri Parker Lee Stadium • Knoxville, TN	L 0–2	50–6	0–1

NCAA Gainesville Regional
Date	Opponent	Rank (Seed)	Site/stadium	Score	Overall record	Reg record
May 19	Florida A&M	(1)	Katie Seashole Pressly Softball Stadium • Gainesville, FL	W 9–0	51–6	1–0
May 20	Oklahoma State	(1)	Katie Seashole Pressly Softball Stadium • Gainesville, FL	W 2–0	52–6	2–0
May 21	Oklahoma State	(1)	Katie Seashole Pressly Softball Stadium • Gainesville, FL	L 0–1	52–7	2–1
May 21	Oklahoma State	(1)	Katie Seashole Pressly Softball Stadium • Gainesville, FL	W 5–0	53–7	3–1

NCAA Gainesville Super Regional
Date	Opponent	Rank (Seed)	Site/stadium	Score	Overall record	SR record
May 25	(16) Alabama	(1)	Katie Seashole Pressly Softball Stadium • Gainesville, FL	L 0–3	53–8	0–1
May 26	(16) Alabama	(1)	Katie Seashole Pressly Softball Stadium • Gainesville, FL	W 2–0	54–8	1–1
May 27	(16) Alabama	(1)	Katie Seashole Pressly Softball Stadium • Gainesville, FL	W 2–1	55–8	2–1

NCAA Women's College World Series
Date	Opponent	Rank (seed)	Site/stadium	Score	Overall record	WCWS Record
June 1	(9) Texas A&M	(1)	ASA Hall of Fame Stadium • Oklahoma City, OK	W 8–0^{5}	56–8	1–0
June 2	(13) LSU	(1)	ASA Hall of Fame Stadium • Oklahoma City, OK	W 7–0	57–8	2–0
June 4	(6) Washington	(1)	ASA Hall of Fame Stadium • Oklahoma City, OK	W 5–2	58–8	3–0
June 5	(10) Oklahoma	(1)	ASA Hall of Fame Stadium • Oklahoma City, OK	L 5–7^{17}	58–9	3–1
June 6	(10) Oklahoma	(1)	ASA Hall of Fame Stadium • Oklahoma City, OK	L 4–5	58–10	3–2
