= Auburn Tigers softball =

Auburn Tigers
- 2026 Auburn Tigers softball team
- Founded: 1997 (29 years ago)
- University: Auburn University
- Athletic director: John Cohen
- Head coach: Chris & Kate Malveaux (2nd season)
- Conference: SEC
- Location: Auburn, Alabama, US
- Home stadium: Jane B. Moore Field (capacity: 2,316)
- Nickname: Tigers
- Colors: Burnt orange and navy blue

NCAA WCWS runner-up
- 2016

NCAA WCWS appearances
- 2015, 2016

NCAA super regional appearances
- 2015, 2016, 2017

NCAA Tournament appearances
- 2002, 2004, 2005, 2006, 2008, 2009, 2010, 2011, 2012, 2014, 2015, 2016, 2017, 2018, 2019, 2021, 2022, 2023, 2024, 2025

Conference tournament championships
- 2015, 2016

The Auburn Tigers softball team is an American softball team, representing the Auburn Tigers from Auburn University. Their first season was 1997. The Auburn Tigers play their home games at Jane B. Moore Field.

== History ==
National champions †	Conference Season Champions *	Conference Tournament Champions ‡	NCAA Tournament Appearance ^

Season	Head coach	Season results						Postseason result	Final ranking	
Season	Head coach	Conference finish	Wins	Losses	Ties	SEC Wins	SEC Losses	Postseason result	NFCA Poll	USA Softball Poll
Auburn Tigers
1997	Tina Deese	3rd West	34	35	0	15	15	—	—	—
1998	Tina Deese	6th West	16	40	0	6	20	—	—	—
1999	Tina Deese	5th West	27	32	1	11	19	—	—	—
2000	Tina Deese	5th West	34	31	0	10	19	—	—	—
2001	Tina Deese	5th West	31	32	0	10	20	—	—	—
2002	Tina Deese	3rd West	37	28	0	15	15	NCAA Tallahassee Regional	—	—
2003	Tina Deese	3rd West	26	31	0	13	16	—	—	—
2004	Tina Deese	2nd West	42	18	0	19	10	NCAA Stanford Regional	23	—
2005	Tina Deese	2nd West	50	18	0	21	8	NCAA Auburn Regional	21	—
2006	Tina Deese	2nd West	36	22	0	21	8	NCAA Tucson Regional	—	—
2007	Tina Deese	5th West	26	30	0	10	18	—	—	—
2008	Tina Deese	3rd West	38	22	0	13	14	NCAA College Station Regional	—	—
2009	Tina Deese	4th West	30	29	0	9	19	NCAA Atlanta Regional	—	—
2010	Tina Deese	3rd West	31	26	0	11	17	NCAA Atlanta Regional	—	—
2011	Tina Deese	3rd West	40	19	0	15	13	NCAA Seattle Regional	RV	—
2012	Tina Deese	3rd West	33	23	0	12	16	NCAA Austin Regional	—	—
2013	Tina Deese	—	30	23	0	7	17	—	—	—
2014	Clint Myers	T-8th	42	19	1	11	13	NCAA Minneapolis Regional	20	21
2015 ‡	Clint Myers	2nd ‡	56	11	0	18	6	NCAA Auburn Regional; NCAA Auburn Super Regional; Women's College World Series	3	3
2016 ‡	Clint Myers	4th ‡	58	12	0	16	7	NCAA Auburn Regional; NCAA Auburn Super Regional; Women's College World Series	2	2
2017	Clint Myers	2nd	49	12	0	17	7	NCAA Auburn Regional; NCAA Auburn Super Regional	13	13
2018	Mickey Dean	9th	41	17	0	11	12	NCAA Tallahassee Regional	—	—
2019	Mickey Dean	10th	39	21	0	10	14	NCAA Tucson Regional	—	22
2020	Mickey Dean		16	11	0	0	3	No NCAA Tournament due to COVID-19 pandemic	—	—
2021	Mickey Dean	12th	27	24	0	7	17	NCAA Tallahassee Regional	—	—
2022	Mickey Dean	10th	40	17	0	11	13	NCAA Clemson Regional	24	—
2023	Mickey Dean	3rd	43	19	0	15	9	NCAA Clemson Regional	20	17
2024	Mickey Dean	10th	29	21	1	9	15	NCAA Tallahassee Regional	—	—
2025	Chris & Kate Malveaux	T–11th	35	24	0	6	18	NCAA Tallahassee Regional	—	—

== Head coaches ==
#	Name	Year(s)	Season(s)	GC	W	L	T	%	SECW	SECL	SEC%	CC	Reg	SupReg	WCWS	NC	Awards
1	Tina Deese	17	1997–2013	1,020	561	459	1	.550	218	251	.465	—	9	—	—	—	—
2	Clint Myers	4	2014–2017	259	205	53	1	.793	62	33	.653	2	4	3	2	—	—
3	Mickey Dean	7	2018–2024	366	235	130	1	.643	63	83	.432	—	6	—	—	—	—
4	Chris & Kate Malveaux	1	2025–present	59	35	24	0	.593	6	18	.250	—	1	—	—	—	—

== Awards and honors ==
=== Conference awards ===
SEC Player of the Year

- Kasey Cooper (2016)

SEC Pitcher of the Year

- Maddie Penta (2023)

SEC Freshman of the Year

- Sara Dean (2002)

=== All-Americans ===
Player	Year	Team	Position
Ashley Moore	2001	2nd	Outfielder
Kristen Keyes	2004	3rd	Pitcher
Sara Dean	2004	3rd	Catcher/Outfielder
Holly Currie	2005	2nd	Pitcher/First Base
Paige Jones	2005	3rd	First Base
Branndi Melero	2014	1st	Outfielder
Kasey Cooper	2014	2nd	Third base
Emily Carosone	2014	3rd	Second base
Kasey Cooper	2015	1st	Third base
Emily Carosone	2015	1st	Second base
Tiffany Howard	2015	3rd	Outfielder
Kasey Cooper	2016	1st	Third base
Emily Carosone	2016	2nd	Second base
Jade Rhodes	2016	3rd	First base
Kaylee Carlson	2017	3rd	Pitcher
