= 2017 Auburn Tigers softball team =

American college softball season

2017 Auburn Tigers softball
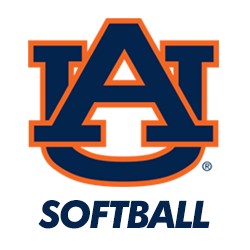
- Conference: Southeastern Conference
- West
- Record: 49–12 (17–7 SEC)
- Head coach: Clint Myers
- Assistant coach: Scott Woodard, Casey Myers, & Hunter Veach
- Pitching coach: Corey Myers (resigned)
- Home stadium: Jane B. Moore Field

2017 Southeastern Conference softball standings
	Conf.				Overall
Team	W		L	PCT	W		L	PCT
No. 2 Florida ‍†‍‍^{y}	20	–	3	.870	58	–	10	.853
No. 13 Auburn ‍‍‍^{y}	17	–	7	.708	49	–	12	.803
No. 11 Tennessee ‍‍‍^{y}	16	–	7	.696	48	–	12	.800
No. 8 Texas A&M ‍‍‍^{y}	16	–	7	.696	47	–	13	.783
No. 12 Alabama ‍‍‍^{y}	12	–	11	.522	46	–	18	.719
No. 6 LSU ‍‍‍^{y}	12	–	12	.500	48	–	22	.686
No. 17 Kentucky ‍‍‍^{y}	12	–	12	.500	39	–	19	.672
No. 16 Ole Miss ‍‍‡‍^{y}	10	–	14	.417	43	–	20	.683
Mississippi State ‍‍‍^{y}	10	–	14	.417	36	–	22	.621
South Carolina ‍‍‍^{y}	8	–	15	.348	34	–	25	.576
Missouri ‍‍‍^{y}	7	–	16	.304	29	–	28	.509
Arkansas ‍‍‍^{y}	7	–	17	.292	31	–	24	.564
No. 25 Georgia ‍‍‍^{y}	6	–	18	.250	35	–	23	.603
† – Conference champion ‡ – Tournament champion y – Invited to the NCAA tournament As of May 31, 2017; Rankings from NFCA

The 2017 Auburn Tigers softball team was an American softball team that represented Auburn University during the 2017 NCAA softball season. The Auburn Tigers played their home games at Jane B. Moore Field.

The Tigers 2017 regular season finished in 2nd place within the conference, and received the 2nd seed in the 2017 SEC softball tournament.

== Roster ==
2017 Auburn Softball Roster

No.	Name	Pos.	B	T	Ht.	Class	Hometown(High School)
#00	Carlee Wallace	C	R	R	5'2	3-Junior	Alpine, CA (Valhalla)
#1	KK Crocker	INF	L	R	5'3	1-Freshman	Tuscaloosa, AL (Hillcrest)
#2	Haley Fagan	INF	R	R	5'10	4-Senior	Dunnellon, FL
#3	Whitney Jordan	OF	R	R	5'10	3-Junior	Athens, AL
#4	Madi Gipson	OF	R	R	5'6	3-Junior	Hoover, AL (Spain Park)
#6	Laney Joyner	INF	R	R	5'7	1-Freshman	Woodstock, GA (Valhalla)
#7	Emily Spain	INF	L	R	5'4	3-Junior	Pelham, AL
#8	Brittany Maresette	OF	L	R	5'4	1-Freshman	Snellville, GA (Archer)
#9	Tannon Snow	INF	R	R	5'7	2-Sophomore	Chino Hills, CA
#10	Carmyn Greenwood	OF	L	R	5'8	1-Freshman	Birmingham, AL (Oak Mountain)
#11	Casey McCrackin	INF	R	R	5'9	2-Sophomore	Cantonment, FL (J.M. Tate)
#13	Kasey Cooper	INF	L	R	5'4	4-Senior	Dothan, AL
#14	Ashlee Swindle	P(R)	R	R	5'6	1-Freshman	Jasper, AL (Curry)
#15	Bree Fornis	OF	R	R	5'4	2-Sophomore	Tuscaloosa, AL (Hillcrest)
#16	Kaylee Carlson	P(R)	R	R	5'10	3-Junior	Garden Grove, CA (Pacifica)
#17	Morgan Podany	OF	R	R	5'4	2-Sophomore	Ponte Vedra Beach, FL
#18	Justus Perry	INF	R	R	5'9	1-Freshman	Prior Lake, MN Curry High School, Jasper, AL
#21	Alyssa Rivera	UTIL	L	R	5'9	1-Freshman	Eagle Lake, FL (Lake Region)
#23	Breanna Gutierrez	C	R	R	5'6	1-Freshman	Buford, GA
#24	Kendall Veach	INF	R	R	5'9	2-Sophomore	Selma, AL (Morgan Academy)
#27	Victoria Draper	OF	L	R	5'6	3-Junior	Moulton, AL (Lawrence County)
#29	Makayla Martin	P(R)	L	R	5'11	2-Sophomore	San Diego, CA (Scripps Ranch)
#30	Alexa Nemeth	P(L)	L	L	5'5	1-Freshman	Auburn, AL
#44	Jenna Abbott	P(L)/DP	L	L	5'4	4-Senior	Dawsonville, GA (Dawson County)
#77	Sydne Waldrop	OF	L	R	5'3	4-Senior	Springville, AL
#93	Courtney Shea	C	L	R	5'10	3-Junior	Mountain Brook, AL

=== Coaching staff ===
2017 Auburn Softball Coaches
- Clint Myers – Head coach – 4th year
- Corey Myers – Associate head coach, pitching coach – 4th year (resigned)
- Hunter Veach – Assistant coach, pitching coach – 1st year
- Scott Woodard – Assistant coach, hitting coach – 4th year
- Casey Myers – Volunteer assistant coach – 3rd year
- Megan Reynolds – Director of operations
- Lana Meeks – Athletic trainer
- Emily Stone – Manager
- Taylor Coe – Manager
- Cheyenne Coyle – Graduate assistant
- Kasey Fagan – Graduate assistant
- Haley Steele – Graduate assistant
- Elayna Siebert – Graduate assistant
- Emily Maggi – Athletic trainer intern

== Schedule ==
2017 Auburn Tigers Softball Schedule

Date	Time	Opponent	Rank^{#}	Site	Result	Attendance	Winning Pitcher	Losing Pitcher
Triple Crown Tournament
February 9*	1:00 PM	#1 Oklahoma	#2	Nancy Almaraz Stadium • Puerto Vallarta, Mexico	W 3–2	687	Martin (1−0)	Lowary (0−1)
February 9*	7:00 PM	#13 Washington	#2	Nancy Almaraz Stadium • Puerto Vallarta, Mexico	L 1–2^{(10)}	1,100	Alvelo (1–0)	Martin (1–1)
February 10*	2:00 PM	Nebraska	#2	Nancy Almaraz Stadium • Puerto Vallarta, Mexico	W 3–2	300	Carlson (1-0)	McClure (0-1)
February 11*	10:00 AM	BYU	#2	Nancy Almaraz Stadium • Puerto Vallarta, Mexico	W 3–0	656	Martin (2-1)	Paulson (0-1)
February 16*	6:00 PM	SIUE	#2	Jane B. Moore Field • Auburn, AL	W 4–3^{(8)}	1,886	Carlson (2-0)	Chamberts (3-1)
Plainsman Invitational
February 17*	2:30 PM	Creighton	#2	Jane B. Moore Field • Auburn, AL	W 8–0^{(5)}	2,420	Carlson (3-0)	Hylton (0-4)
February 17*	4:45 PM	SIUE	#2	Jane B. Moore Field • Auburn, AL	W 8–1	2,057	Carlson (4-0)	Ingles (2-1)
February 18*	3:30 PM	Evansville	#2	Jane B. Moore Field • Auburn, AL	W 5–3	2,420	Martin (3-1)	Lockhart (0-2)
February 18*	6:00 PM	Creighton	#2	Jane B. Moore Field • Auburn, AL	W 9–0	2,420	Martin (4-1)	Clark (2-2)
February 19*	2:00 PM	Mercer	#2	Jane B. Moore Field • Auburn, AL	W 10–1	2,233	Carlson (5-0)	Rodriguez (0-2)
February 23*	6:00 PM	North Dakota	#2	Jane B. Moore Field • Auburn, AL	W 6–0	1,752	Carlson (6-0)	VanDomelen (1-3)
Tiger Invitational
February 24*	3:30 PM	UMass-Lowell	#2	Jane B. Moore Field • Auburn, AL	W 13–0^{(5)}	2,063	Carlson (7-0)	Talcik (0-3)
February 24*	6:00 PM	North Dakota	#2	Jane B. Moore Field • Auburn, AL	W 8–0^{(6)}	2,063	Martin (5-1)	Bergh (5-2)
February 25*	2:30 PM	Yale	#2	Jane B. Moore Field • Auburn, AL	W 9–0^{(5)}	2,620	Martin (6-1)	Casalino (0-2)
February 25*	4:45 PM	#13 James Madison	#2	Jane B. Moore Field • Auburn, AL	W 4–0	2,620	Carlson (8-0)	Odicci (4-2)
February 26*	1:00 PM	#13 James Madison	#2	Jane B. Moore Field • Auburn, AL	L 0–1	2,111	Good (8-0)	Martin (6-2)
March 2*	6:00 PM	Liberty	#2	Jane B. Moore Field • Auburn, AL	W 15–0^{(5)}	1,773	Carlson (9-0)	DiMartino (2-2)
Wilson/DeMarini Classic
March 3*	6:00 PM	Liberty	#2	Jane B. Moore Field • Auburn, AL	W 9–1^{(6)}	1,875	Martin (7-2)	Cassady (2-4)
March 4*	3:30 PM	College of Charleston	#2	Jane B. Moore Field • Auburn, AL	W 14–0^{(5)}	–	Carlson (10-0)	Berouty (2-1)
March 4*	6:00 PM	Texas State	#2	Jane B. Moore Field • Auburn, AL	W 8–1	2,372	Martin (8-2)	Rupp (8-2)
March 5*	1:00 PM	College of Charleston	#2	Jane B. Moore Field • Auburn, AL	W 8–0^{(5)}	1,905	Carlson (11-0)	Martin (2-2)
March 8*	6:00 PM	Alabama State	#2	Jane B. Moore Field • Auburn, AL	W 14–0^{(5)}	1,825	Martin (9-2)	Castro (0-4)
March 10	6:00 PM	#12 LSU	#2	Jane B. Moore Field • Auburn, AL	W 5–4	2,041	Carlson (12-0)	Hoover (3-2)
March 12	12:00 PM	#12 LSU	#2	Jane B. Moore Field • Auburn, AL	L 0–8^{(6)}	2,003	Hoover (4-2)	Martin (9-3)
March 12	4:00 PM	#12 LSU	#2	Jane B. Moore Field • Auburn, AL	W 5–4	2,003	Carlson (13-0)	Hoover (4-3)
March 14*	6:00 PM	#15 Tennessee	#4	Columbia, TN	Canceled			
March 15*	6:00 PM	Middle Tennessee State	#4	Murfreesboro, TN	Canceled			
USF Tournament
March 17*	10:00 AM	North Dakota State	#4	Clearwater, FL	W 2–1	786	Carlson (14–0)	Sertic (8–12)
March 17*	12:30 PM	USF	#4	Clearwater, FL	W 4–0	786	Martin (10–3)	Wysocki (2-1)
March 18*	11:00 AM	Illinois	#4	Clearwater, FL	W 6–2	439	Martin (11-3)	Wonderly (5-7)
March 18*	1:30 PM	Ohio State	#4	Clearwater, FL	W 8–0^{(6)}	538	Carlson (15-0)	Springer (6-2)
March 19*	8:00 AM	LIU Brooklyn	#4	Clearwater, FL	W 9–4	588	Martin (12-3)	Woodson (5-9)
March 25	5:00 PM	#2 Florida	#4	Katie Seashole Pressly Softball Stadium • Gainesville, FL	L 3–4	2,338	Gourley (11-1)	Carlson (15-1)
March 26	6:00 PM	#2 Florida	#4	Katie Seashole Pressly Softball Stadium • Gainesville, FL	L 0–7	1,829	Barnhill (11-0)	Martin (12-4)
March 27	6:00 PM	#2 Florida	#4	Katie Seashole Pressly Softball Stadium • Gainesville, FL	W 1–0	1,575	Carlson (16-1)	Gourley (11-2)
March 31	6:00 PM	#18 Georgia	#5	UGA Softball Stadium • Athens, GA	W 4–3	1,087	Carlson (17-1)	Gray (17-5)
April 1	6:00 PM	#18 Georgia	#5	UGA Softball Stadium • Athens, GA	W 13–4	1,605	Martin (13-4)	Avant (5-4)
April 2	11:00 AM	#18 Georgia	#5	UGA Softball Stadium • Athens, GA	W 4–3	1,423	Carlson (18-1)	Gray (17-6)
April 5*	6:00 PM	Samford	#5	Birmingham, AL	Canceled			
April 7	6:00 PM	#21 Ole Miss	#5	Jane B. Moore Field • Auburn, AL	W 3–1	2,305	Carlson (19-1)	Lee (9-5)
April 8	3:00 PM	#21 Ole Miss	#5	Jane B. Moore Field • Auburn, AL	L 4–10	2,476	Finney (4-0)	Martin (13-5)
April 9	1:00 PM	#21 Ole Miss	#5	Jane B. Moore Field • Auburn, AL	W 3–1	2,173	Carlson (20-1)	Lee (9-6)
April 12*	6:00 PM	Georgia St.	#7	Jane B. Moore Field • Auburn, AL	W 6–3	1,756	Martin (14-5)	Jennings (12-7)
April 14	6:00 PM	Missouri	#7	Jane B. Moore Field • Auburn, AL	L 1–6	2,135	Baxter (12-4)	Carlson (20-2)
April 15	6:00 PM	Missouri	#7	Jane B. Moore Field • Auburn, AL	W 5–4	2,200	Martin (15-5)	Baumgartner (4-5)
April 16	2:00 PM	Missouri	#7	Jane B. Moore Field • Auburn, AL	W 6–1	1,961	Carlson (21-2)	Baxter (12-5)
April 19*	6:00 PM	Kennesaw State	#7	Jane B. Moore Field • Auburn, AL	W 7–3	1,713	Martin (16-5)	Cutting (15-8)
April 21	6:00 PM	South Carolina	#7	Beckham Field • Columbia, SC	W 2–0	1586	Carlson (22-2)	Drotar (6-3)
April 22	6:00 PM	South Carolina	#7	Beckham Field • Columbia, SC	W 2–0	1,762	Swindle (1-0)	Blue (9-9)
April 23	2:00 PM	South Carolina	#7	Beckham Field • Columbia, SC	L 0–3	1,578	Elliott (12-8)	Carlson (22-3)
April 26*	6:00 PM	Alabama State	#9	Lagoon Park • Montgomery, AL	W 14–1^{(6)}	1,503	Swindle (2-0)	Bradford (9-11)
April 28	6:00 PM	Mississippi St.	#9	Jane B. Moore Field • Auburn, AL	W 4–2	2,140	Carlson (23-3)	Ward (7-7)
April 29	6:00 PM	Mississippi St.	#9	Jane B. Moore Field • Auburn, AL	W 6–2	2,331	Carlson (24-3)	Silkwood (14-6)
April 30	1:00 PM	Mississippi St.	#9	Jane B. Moore Field • Auburn, AL	W 6–3	2,164	Martin (17-5)	Ward (7-8)
May 5	7:00 PM	#14 Alabama	#9	Rhoads Stadium • Tuscaloosa, AL	W 3–0^{(9)}	4,015	Carlson (25-3)	Littlejohn (14-6)
May 6	6:00 PM	#14 Alabama	#9	Rhoads Stadium • Tuscaloosa, AL	W 4–1	4,015	Martin (18-5)	Littlejohn (14-7)
May 7	12:00 PM	#14 Alabama	#9	Rhoads Stadium • Tuscaloosa, AL	L 2–3	4,015	Osorio (20-7)	Swindle (2-1)
2017 Southeastern Conference softball tournament
May 11	5:00 PM	#18 Kentucky (Quarterfinal)	#7	Lee Stadium • Knoxville, TN	W 2–0	2,448	Carlson (26-3)	Rethlake (9-5)
May 13	1:00 PM	#21 LSU (Semifinal)	#7	Lee Stadium • Knoxville, TN	L 0–6	2,475	Walljasper (16-4)	Carlson (26-4)
NCAA Regionals
May 18*	3:30 PM	East Tennessee State University	#8	Jane B. Moore Field • Auburn, AL	W 11–0^{(5)}	1,940	Martin (19-5)	Ogle (12-13)
May 19*	11:00 AM	California	#8	Jane B. Moore Field • Auburn, AL	W 4–3^{(9)}	1,984	Martin (20-5)	Conley (20-14)
May 21*	11:30 AM	California	#8	Jane B. Moore Field • Auburn, AL	W 8–2	1,917	Carlson (27-4)	Trzcinski (7-7)
NCAA Super Regionals
May 26*	3:00 PM	#6 Oklahoma	#8	Jane B. Moore Field • Auburn, AL	L 0–4	2,477	Parker (23-5)	Martin (20-6)
May 27*	12:00 PM	#6 Oklahoma	#8	Jane B. Moore Field • Auburn, AL	L 2–5	2,420	Lowary (15-3)	Carlson (27-5)
*Non-Conference Game. ^{#}Rankings from NFCA released prior to game.All times are in Central Time Zone.

- The second game of the series vs. LSU was postponed due to bad weather. The game, which was originally scheduled for March 11 at 7:30 PM, was moved to March 12 at 12:00 PM as part of a doubleheader.

== Ranking movement ==
Poll	Pre	Wk 1	Wk 2	Wk 3	Wk 4	Wk 5	Wk 6	Wk 7	Wk 8	Wk 9	Wk 10	Wk 11	Wk 12	Wk 13	Wk 14	Final
USA Today / NFCA Coaches	2	2 (8)	2 (10)	2 (2)	2 (2)	4	4	5	5	7	7	9	9	7	8	13
ESPN / USA Softball	2	2 (1)	2 (4)	3 (2)	4	5	6	7	6	7	7	10	10	8	T8	13
