= 2017 Alabama Crimson Tide softball team =

2017 Alabama Crimson Tide softball
- Conference: Southeastern Conference
- West
- Record: 47–17 (12–11 SEC)
- Head coach: Patrick Murphy
- Assistant coach: Alyson Habetz
- Pitching coach: Stephanie Prothro
- Home stadium: Rhoads Stadium

2017 Southeastern Conference softball standings
	Conf.				Overall
Team	W		L	PCT	W		L	PCT
No. 2 Florida ‍†‍‍^{y}	20	–	3	.870	58	–	10	.853
No. 13 Auburn ‍‍‍^{y}	17	–	7	.708	49	–	12	.803
No. 11 Tennessee ‍‍‍^{y}	16	–	7	.696	48	–	12	.800
No. 8 Texas A&M ‍‍‍^{y}	16	–	7	.696	47	–	13	.783
No. 12 Alabama ‍‍‍^{y}	12	–	11	.522	46	–	18	.719
No. 6 LSU ‍‍‍^{y}	12	–	12	.500	48	–	22	.686
No. 17 Kentucky ‍‍‍^{y}	12	–	12	.500	39	–	19	.672
No. 16 Ole Miss ‍‍‡‍^{y}	10	–	14	.417	43	–	20	.683
Mississippi State ‍‍‍^{y}	10	–	14	.417	36	–	22	.621
South Carolina ‍‍‍^{y}	8	–	15	.348	34	–	25	.576
Missouri ‍‍‍^{y}	7	–	16	.304	29	–	28	.509
Arkansas ‍‍‍^{y}	7	–	17	.292	31	–	24	.564
No. 25 Georgia ‍‍‍^{y}	6	–	18	.250	35	–	23	.603
† – Conference champion ‡ – Tournament champion y – Invited to the NCAA tournament As of May 31, 2017; Rankings from NFCA

The 2017 Alabama Crimson Tide softball team was an American softball team that represented the University of Alabama for the 2017 NCAA softball season. The Crimson Tide played their home games at Rhoads Stadium. After losing in the 2016 Women's College World Series, the 2017 team looked to make the postseason for the 19th straight year, and the Women's College World Series for twelfth time. This season represented the 21st season of softball in the school's history.

== Personnel ==
=== Roster ===
2017 Alabama Crimson Tide roster
Pitchers: 25 Madi Moore – Sophomore; 27 Alexis Osorio – Junior; 28 Sydney Littlejohn – Senior; Outfielders: 1 Elissa Brown – Freshman; 4 Rachel Bobo – Junior; 7 Merris Schroder – Sophomore; 10 Mari Cranek – Sophomore; 15 Gabby Callaway – Freshman; Catchers: 20 Carrigan Fain – Junior; 54 Reagan Dykes – Sophomore	Infielders: 2 Demi Turner – Junior; 3 Peyton Grantham – Junior; 6 Sydney Booker – Junior; 9 Marisa Runyon – Senior; 33 Claire Jenkins – Freshman; Utility: 5 Chandler Dare – Senior; 16 Bailey Hemphill – Freshman; 34 Caroline Hardy – Sophomore

2017 Alabama Crimson Tide Softball Roster

=== Coaching staff ===
2017 Alabama Crimson Tide softball coaching staff
- Patrick Murphy – Head coach – 19th year
- Alyson Habetz – Associate head coach, hitting coach – 19th year
- Stephanie VanBrakle – Assistant coach, pitching coach – 6th year
- Adam Arbour – Volunteer assistant coach – 6th year
- Kate Harris – Director of operations- 7th year
- Erin Weaver – Athletic trainer

== Schedule ==
Date	Time	Opponent	Rank^{#}	Site	Result	Attendance	Winning Pitcher	Losing Pitcher
Kickin' Chicken Classic
February*	11:30 AM	Towson	#7	CCU Softball Stadium • Conway, SC	W 17–0^{(5)}	201	S. Littlejohn	M. Dejter
February 10*	2:00 PM	Coastal Carolina	#7	CCU Softball Stadium • Conway, SC	W 6–0	893	A. Osorio	A. Guillette
February 11*	9:00 AM	Towson	#7	CCU Softball Stadium • Conway, SC	W 4–2	302	A. Osorio	J. Smith
February 11*	11:30 AM	Youngstown St.	#7	CCU Softball Stadium • Conway, SC	W 7–0	392	S. Littlejohn	P. Geanangel
February 12*	11:00 AM	Coastal Carolina	#7	CCU Softball Stadium • Conway, SC	W 9–3	973	M. Moore	T. Rahach
February 15*	5:00 PM	South Alabama	#5	Rhoads Stadium • Tuscaloosa, AL	W 3–1	2,518	A. Osorio	D. Brown
February 18*	1:00 PM	#18 Louisiana–Lafayette	#5	Lamson Park • Lafayette, LA	W 3–0	–	A. Osorio	M. Smith
February 18*	3:30 PM	#18 Louisiana–Lafayette	#5	Lamson Park • Lafayette, LA	L 2–11^{(6)}	2,210	A. Stewart	M. Moore
February 19*	1:00 PM	#18 Louisiana–Lafayette	#5	Lamson Park • Lafayette, LA	L 0–7	2,079	A. Denham	A. Osorio
February 22*	6:00 PM	North Florida	#10	Rhoads Stadium • Tuscaloosa, AL	W 2–0	2,364	S. Littlejohn	L. Green
Easton Bama Bash
February 24*	4:00 PM	UCF	#10	Rhoads Stadium • Tuscaloosa, AL	W 4–0	–	S. Littlejohn	A. White
February 24*	6:00 PM	Texas Tech	#10	Rhoads Stadium • Tuscaloosa, AL	W 7–2	2,628	A. Osorio	K. Scott
February 25*	1:30 PM	Gardner–Webb	#10	Rhoads Stadium • Tuscaloosa, AL	W 9–0^{(5)}	–	M. Moore	M. Thompson
February 25*	4:00 PM	Texas Tech	#10	Rhoads Stadium • Tuscaloosa, AL	W 8–0^{(6)}	2,922	S. Littlejohn	M. Maisel
February 26*	1:30 PM	UCF	#10	Rhoads Stadium • Tuscaloosa, AL	W 3–2	2,446	A. Osorio	M. Calixto
February 28*	6:00 PM	UAB	#11	Mary Bowers Field • Birmingham, AL	W 5–4^{(8)}	807	A. Osorio	C. Blount
Easton Crimson Classic
March 3*	4:00 PM	Jacksonville	#11	Rhoads Stadium • Tuscaloosa, AL	W 10–0^{(5)}	–	A. Osorio	A. Bilodeau
March 3*	6:00 PM	Drake	#11	Rhoads Stadium • Tuscaloosa, AL	W 6–1	2,264	S. Littlejohn	K. Smith
March 4*	1:30 PM	Stanford	#11	Rhoads Stadium • Tuscaloosa, AL	W 4–0	–	A. Osorio	C. Lee
March 4*	4:00 PM	Drake	#11	Rhoads Stadium • Tuscaloosa, AL	W 10–0^{(5)}	2,741	M. Moore	A. Knoche
March 5*	1:30 PM	Jacksonville	#11	Rhoads Stadium • Tuscaloosa, AL	W 7–0	2,446	S. Littlejohn	A. Bilodeau
March 7*	6:00 PM	Loyola-Chicago	#11	Rhoads Stadium • Tuscaloosa, AL	W 5–0	2,201	A. Osorio	K. Jones
March 8*	6:00 PM	Valparaiso	#11	Rhoads Stadium • Tuscaloosa, AL	W 1–0	2,224	S. Littlejohn	A. Montgomery
March 10	6:30 PM	Arkansas	#11	Rhoads Stadium • Tuscaloosa, AL	W 9–0^{(5)}	2,454	A. Osorio	G. Moll
March 12	11:30 AM	Arkansas	#11	Rhoads Stadium • Tuscaloosa, AL	W 4–3^{(9)}	–	A. Osorio	A. Storms
March 12	1:30 PM	Arkansas	#11	Rhoads Stadium • Tuscaloosa, AL	W 5–0^{(6)}	3,026	A. Osorio	C. Hedgcock
March 15*	3:30 PM	Winthrop	#11	Rhoads Stadium • Tuscaloosa, AL	W 1–0	–	S. Littlejohn	K. Romine
March 15*	6:00 PM	Georgia Southern	#11	Rhoads Stadium • Tuscaloosa, AL	W 9–0^{(5)}	2,426	A. Osorio	D. Raley
March 17	6:00 PM	Mississippi St.	#11	Nusz Park • Starkville, MS	W 11–3^{(5)}	959	A. Osorio	R. Green
March 18	6:00 PM	Mississippi St.	#11	Nusz Park • Starkville, MS	L 0–1	1,056	H. Ward	S. Littlejohn
March 19	2:00 PM	Mississippi St.	#11	Nusz Park • Starkville, MS	W 3–0	931	A. Osorio	H. Ward
March 24	6:30 PM	South Carolina	#9	Rhoads Stadium • Tuscaloosa, AL	W 7–3	2,815	S. Littlejohn	J. Elliott
March 26	12:00 PM	South Carolina	#9	Rhoads Stadium • Tuscaloosa, AL	L 0–14	–	N. Blue	A. Osorio
March 26	1:30 PM	South Carolina	#9	Rhoads Stadium • Tuscaloosa, AL	W 5–2	3,140	S. Littlejohn	J. Elliott
March 28*	6:00 PM	Kent St.	#9	Rhoads Stadium • Tuscaloosa, AL	W 5–3	2,526	S. Littlejohn	R. Ladines
March 31	6:30 PM	Missouri	#9	University Field • Columbia, MO	L 0–2	896	C. Baxter	A. Osorio
April 1	5:00 PM	Missouri	#9	University Field • Columbia, MO	W 9–3	2,069	S. Littlejohn	M. Norman
April 2	12:00 PM	Missouri	#9	University Field • Columbia, MO	L 3–4^{(9)}	1,178	C. Baxter	A. Osorio
April 5*	6:00 PM	Lipscomb	#12	Florence Sportsplex • Florence, AL	W 5–0	–	S. Littlejohn	M. Jordan
April 7	6:30 PM	#8 LSU	#12	Rhoads Stadium • Tuscaloosa, AL	W 3–0	2,345	A. Osorio	A. Walljasper
April 8	8:00 PM	#8 LSU	#12	Rhoads Stadium • Tuscaloosa, AL	L 0–1	3,376	S. Smith	S. Littlejohn
April 9	2:00 PM	#8 LSU	#12	Rhoads Stadium • Tuscaloosa, AL	W 4–2	3,940	A. Osorio	S. Smith
April 11*	6:00 PM	UAB	#9	Rhoads Stadium • Tuscaloosa, AL	W 8–0^{(5)}	2,316	M. Moore	C. Goodwin
April 15	5:00 PM	#16 Tennessee	#9	Lee Stadium • Knoxville, TN	L 2–3	1,935	C. Arnold	A. Osorio
April 16	6:00 PM	#16 Tennessee	#9	Lee Stadium • Knoxville, TN	L 0–2	1,783	M. Moss	S. Littlejohn
April 17	6:00 PM	#16 Tennessee	#9	Lee Stadium • Knoxville, TN	Canceled	–	–	–
April 19*	6:00 PM	Southern Miss	#12	Rhoads Stadium • Tuscaloosa, AL	W 2–0	2,347	M. Moore	K. Crowson
April 21*	6:00 PM	#9 Washington	#12	Rhoads Stadium • Tuscaloosa, AL	L 2–3	3,093	T. Alvelo	A. Osorio
April 22*	2:00 PM	#9 Washington	#12	Rhoads Stadium • Tuscaloosa, AL	L 0–3	3,332	T. Alvelo	S. Littlejohn
April 25*	6:00 PM	Samford	#13	Bulldog Field • Birmingham, AL	W 8–1	544	M. Moore	R. Leonard
April 29	2:00 PM	#20 Ole Miss	#13	OM Softball Complex • Oxford, MS	W 2–0	–	A. Osorio	K. Lee
April 30	5:00 PM	#20 Ole Miss	#13	OM Softball Complex • Oxford, MS	L 0–2	1,188	B. Finney	S. Littlejohn
May 1	6:00 PM	#20 Ole Miss	#13	OM Softball Complex • Oxford, MS	L 4–5	478	K. Lee	A. Osorio
May 5	7:00 PM	#9 Auburn	#14	Rhoads Stadium • Tuscaloosa, AL	L 0–3^{(9)}	4,015	K. Carlson	S. Littlejohn
May 6	6:00 PM	#9 Auburn	#14	Rhoads Stadium • Tuscaloosa, AL	L 1–4	4,015	M. Martin	S. Littlejohn
May 7	12:00 PM	#9 Auburn	#14	Rhoads Stadium • Tuscaloosa, AL	W 3–2	4,015	A. Osorio	A. Swindle
SEC softball tournament
May 10	11:00 AM	Arkansas	#15	Lee Stadium • Knoxville, TN	W 4–1	–	S. Littlejohn	A. Storms
May 11	11:00 AM	#11 Texas A&M	#15	Lee Stadium • Knoxville, TN	W 2–1^{(10)}	–	A. Osorio	M. McBride
May 12	2:00 PM	#18 Ole Miss	#15	Lee Stadium • Knoxville, TN	L 1–4	–	K. Lee	S. Littlejohn
NCAA Tuscaloosa Regional
May 19	4:00 PM	Albany	#15	Rhoads Stadium • Tuscaloosa, AL	W 5–1	1,812	S. Littlejohn	D. Durando
May 20	11:30 AM	#1 Minnesota	#15	Rhoads Stadium • Tuscaloosa, AL	W 1–0^{(9)}	1,517	A. Osorio	S. Groenewegen
May 21	4:00 PM	#1 Minnesota	#15	Rhoads Stadium • Tuscaloosa, AL	W 1–0	1,926	S. Littlejohn	S. Groenewegen
NCAA Gainesville Super Regional
May 25	6:00 PM	#2 Florida	#15	Pressly Stadium • Gainesville, FL	W 3–0	1,800	A. Osorio	K. Barnhill
May 26	6:00 PM	#2 Florida	#15	Pressly Stadium • Gainesville, FL	L 0–2	2,283	D. Gourley	S. Littlejohn
May 27	4:00 PM	#2 Florida	#15	Pressly Stadium • Gainesville, FL	L 1–2	2,216	K. Barnhill	A. Osorio
*Non-Conference Game. ^{#}Rankings from NFCA released prior to game.All times are in Central Time Zone.

== Honors and awards ==
- Alexis Osorio was selected to the Preseason All-SEC Team.
- Alexis Osorio was selected as the SEC Pitcher of the Week, February 13.
- Bailey Hemphill was selected as the SEC Freshman of the Week, February 13.
- Alexis Osorio was selected as the SEC Co-Pitcher of the Week, March 6.

== Ranking movement ==
Poll	Pre	Wk 1	Wk 2	Wk 3	Wk 4	Wk 5	Wk 6	Wk 7	Wk 8	Wk 9	Wk 10	Wk 11	Wk 12	Wk 13	Wk 14	Final
NFCA	7	5	10	11	11	11	9	9	12	9	12	13	14	15		
USA Softball	7	4	10	9	9	8	9	9	11	10	12	13	14	16		

== See also ==
- 2017 Alabama Crimson Tide baseball team
