= 2017 Georgia State Panthers softball team =

American college softball season

2017 Georgia State Panthers softball
- Conference: Sun Belt Conference
- Record: 36–25 (18–9 SBC)
- Head coach: Roger Kincaid
- Home stadium: Robert E. Heck Baseball Complex

2017 Sun Belt Conference softball standings
	Conf.				Overall
Team	W		L	PCT	W		L	PCT
No. 19 Louisiana–Lafayette ‍†‍‡‍^{y}	23	–	1	.958	47	–	8	.855
RV Texas State ‍‍‍^{y}	18	–	8	.692	42	–	17	.712
Georgia State ‍‍‍^{y}	18	–	9	.667	36	–	25	.590
South Alabama ‍‍‍	15	–	12	.556	35	–	20	.636
UT Arlington ‍‍‍	14	–	13	.519	32	–	28	.533
Georgia Southern ‍‍‍	12	–	15	.444	24	–	29	.453
Louisiana-Monroe ‍‍‍	11	–	16	.407	33	–	30	.524
Coastal Carolina ‍‍‍	10	–	16	.385	32	–	23	.582
Troy ‍‍‍	8	–	19	.296	20	–	34	.370
Appalachian State ‍‍‍	2	–	22	.083	14	–	34	.292
‡ – Tournament champion As of March 4, 2019; Rankings from NFCA

The 2017 Georgia State Panthers softball team represented Georgia State University in the 2017 NCAA Division I softball season. The Panthers competed in the Sun Belt Conference and were led by seven-year head coach Roger Kincaid. Georgia State played its home games at the Robert E. Heck Softball Complex in Panthersville, Georgia.

== Roster ==
2017 Georgia State roster
Pitchers: 18 Peyton Worsham - Freshman; 24 Emily Soles - Freshman; 26 Amanda Chance - Sophomore; 27 Kinsley Jennings - Junior; 99 Annie Davis - Junior	Catchers: 4 Ivie Drake – Junior; 14 Mandy Blackwell - Senior; Infielders: 0 Arden Jobe - Sophomore; 1 Kirsten McMonigle - Freshman; 2 Baylee Sexton - Freshman; 3 Taylor Bradley - Junior; 6 Kylee Love - Freshman; 11 Kensey Caldwell - Senior; 12 Caitlin Ray - Freshman; 21 Ambria Derry – Sophomore; 22 Taylor Chadwick - Freshman; 23 Kristin Hawkins - (redshirt) Sophomore	Outfielders: 5 Megan Litumbe - (redshirt) Junior; 7 Cassidy Faulk - Junior; 9 Morgan Brown - Senior; 10 Reagan Morgan - Sophomore; 16 Brenna Skalski - Junior; 29 Chaycie Goggins - Junior; 62 Remington Hasty - Sophomore; 77 Mallory Koepke - Senior

== Schedule ==
2017 Georgia State Panthers softball game log
Regular season
February

#	Date	Opponent	Site/stadium	Score	Overall record	SBC record
1	February 10	Western Kentucky	Starkville, MS	13-1	1-0	-
2	February 10	Mississippi State	Starkville, MS	4-0	1-1	-
3	February 11	Stephen F. Austin	Starkville, MS	3-1	2-1	-
4	February 11	Western Kentucky	Starkville, MS	2-1	3-1	-
5	February 12	Mississippi State	Starkville, MS	3-1	4-1	-
6	February 15	Georgia Tech	Bob Heck Field	8-3	4-2	-
7	February 17	South Carolina State	Jacksonville, FL	8-0	5-2	-
8	February 17	Kansas	Jacksonville, FL	5-34	6-2	-
9	February 18	South Dakota State	Jacksonville, FL	5-4	7-2	-
10	February 18	North Florida	Jacksonville, FL	7-6	7-3	-
11	February 22	Mercer	Macon, GA	8-4	8-3	-
12	February 24	Villanova	Bob Heck Field	6-0	8-4	-
13	February 24	Illinois	Bob Heck Field	13-4	9-4	-
14	February 25	Omaha	Bob Heck Field	3-1	9-5	-
15	February 25	Omaha	Bob Heck Field	12-4	10-5	-
16	February 26	Radford	Bob Heck Field	1-7	10-6	-

March

#	Date	Opponent	Site/stadium	Score	Overall record	SBC record
17	March 3	Syracuse	Tampa, FL	5-2	10-7	-
18	March 3	South Florida	Tampa, FL	1-0	10-8	-
19	March 4	Villanova	Tampa, FL	4-3	11-8	-
20	March 4	Hartford	Tampa, FL	16-1	12-8	-
21	March 5	Central Michigan	Tampa, FL	6-4	13-8	-
22	March 7	Michigan State	Bob Heck Field	2-5	13-9	-
23	March 11	South Alabama	Bob Heck Field	2-0	14-9	1–0
24	March 11	South Alabama	Bob Heck Field	11-3	15-9	2–0
25	March 12	South Alabama	Bob Heck Field	4-3	16-9	3–0
26	March 14	Notre Dame	Bob Heck Field	Cancelled	-	-
27	March 18	Troy	Troy, AL	3-4	16-10	3–1
28	March 18	Troy	Troy, AL	6-5	17-10	4–1
29	March 19	Troy	Troy, AL	9-7	17-11	4–2
30	March 22	Kennesaw State	Bob Heck Field	6-4	18-11	4–2
31	March 25	Appalachian State	Bob Heck Field	12-2	19-11	5–2
32	March 25	Appalachian State	Bob Heck Field	5-3	20-11	6–2
33	March 26	Appalachian State	Bob Heck Field	9-4	21-11	7–2
34	March 29	Georgia Tech	Atlanta, GA	9-5	22-11	7–2

April

#	Date	Opponent	Site/stadium	Score	Overall record	SBC record
35	April 1	Texas State	San Marcos, TX	5-3	23-11	8–2
36	April 1	Texas State	San Marcos, TX	7-5	23-12	8–3
37	April 2	Texas State	San Marcos, TX	4-0	24-12	9–3
38	April 5	Furman	Bob Heck Field	Cancelled	-	-
39	April 8	UT Arlington	Bob Heck Field	3-2	25-12	10–3
40	April 8	UT Arlington	Bob Heck Field	10-6	26-12	11–3
41	April 9	UT Arlington	Bob Heck Field	3-7	26-13	11–4
42	April 11	Kennesaw State	Kennesaw, GA	6-5	26-14	11–4
43	April 12	Auburn	Auburn, AL	3-6	26-15	11–4
44	April 14	Coastal Carolina	Conway, SC	8-1	27-15	12–4
45	April 14	Coastal Carolina	Conway, SC	2-8	27-16	12–5
46	April 15	Coastal Carolina	Conway, SC	5-1	28-16	13–5
47	April 19	#22 Georgia	Athens, GA	11-1	28-17	13–5
48	April 22	#17 Louisiana	Lafayette, LA	4-19	28-18	13–6
49	April 22	#17 Louisiana	Lafayette, LA	1-7	28-19	13–7
50	April 23	#17 Louisiana	Lafayette, LA	6-14	28-20	13–8
51	April 29	ULM	Bob Heck Field	3-2	29-20	14–8
52	April 29	ULM	Bob Heck Field	5-2	30-20	15–8
53	April 30	ULM	Bob Heck Field	5-6	30-21	15–9

May

#	Date	Opponent	Site/stadium	Score	Overall record	SBC record
54	May 5	Georgia Southern	Statesboro, GA	5-3	31-21	16–9
55	May 6	Georgia Southern	Statesboro, GA	9-1	32-21	17–9
56	May 6	Georgia Southern	Statesboro, GA	15-0	33-21	18–9

Sun Belt Tournament

#	Date	Opponent	Site/stadium	Score	Overall record	Tournament record
57	May 10	(7) Troy	Troy, AL	5-2	34-21	(1–0)
57	May 11	(2) Texas State	Troy, AL	2-5	34-22	(1-1)
57	May 11	(5) UT Arlington	Troy, AL	9-8	34-23	(1–2)

NISC Tournament Region 5

#	Date	Opponent	Site/stadium	Score	Overall record	Tournament record
57	May 16	(3) UT Martin	Bob Heck Field	6-5	35-23	(1–0)
58	May 17	(1) Kennesaw State	Bob Heck Field	3-5	35-24	(1-1)
59	May 18	(4) Western Kentucky	Bob Heck Field	3-5	35-24	(2–1)
60	May 18	(1) Kennesaw State	Bob Heck Field	2-3	35-25	(2-2)
