= Kate Malveaux =

American softball coach

Current position
- Title: Co-Head coach
- Team: Auburn
- Conference: SEC
- Record: 62–52–0 (.544)

Biographical details
- Born: Springfield, Illinois, U.S.
- Education: Bradley University

Playing career
- 2008–2011: Bradley

Coaching career (HC unless noted)
- 2012: Bradley (volunteer asst.)
- 2017: Louisiana (asst.)
- 2021–2024: Tennessee (asst.)
- 2025–present: Auburn (Co-HC)

Administrative career (AD unless noted)
- 2015–2016: Louisiana (Director of operations)
- 2020–2021: Missouri (Director of operations)

Head coaching record
- Overall: 62–52–0 (.544)

Kate Malveaux (née Singler) is an American softball coach who, along with her husband, Chris, is the co-head coach at Auburn.

== Playing career ==
Singler played college softball at Bradley University. During the 2010 season, in her junior year, she led the team in doubles (6), home runs (4), RBI (25), hit by pitch (7), and slugging percentage (.410). She started 35 games at catcher and six at designated player. During the 2011 season, in her senior year, she had a .283 batting average, with 24 runs, eight home runs, 14 walks, and led the team with 29 RBI. Following the season she was named a second-team All-Missouri Valley Conference selection. Following her graduation, she joined the Bradley coaching staff as a volunteer assistant coach in 2012.

== Coaching career ==
=== Louisiana ===
Malveaux joined Louisiana's staff as director of operations in the fall of 2015. She was promoted to assistant coach for the 2017 season. She was dismissed on November 1, 2017.

=== Missouri ===
Malveaux served as director of operations at Missouri from 2020 to 2021.

=== Tennessee ===
On June 25, 2021, Malveaux and her husband Chris were both named assistant coaches at Tennessee. She spent the 2022 and 2023 seasons as a volunteer assistant, before being promoted to an assistant coach on June 30, 2023.

=== Auburn ===
On June 5, 2024, Malveaux was named co-head coach at Auburn, along with her husband Chris.

== Personal life ==
Malveaux married Chris Malveaux on December 20, 2014. They met in 2012 when they were both members of the Bradley coaching staff.

== Head coaching record ==
Record table
Season	Team	Overall	Conference	Standing	Postseason
Auburn Tigers (Southeastern Conference) (2025–present)
2025	Auburn	35–24	6–18	T–11th	NCAA Regional
2026	Auburn	27–28	4–20	14th	
Auburn:		62–52 (.544)	10–38 (.208)		
Total:		62–52–0 (.544)			
National champion Postseason invitational champion Conference regular season champion Conference regular season and conference tournament champion Division regular season champion Division regular season and conference tournament champion Conference tournament champion
