= Chris Malveaux =

American softball coach

Current position
- Title: Co-Head coach
- Team: Auburn
- Conference: SEC
- Record: 62–52–0 (.544)

Biographical details
- Born: Houston, Texas, U.S.

Coaching career (HC unless noted)
- 2002–2004: McNeese State (asst.)
- 2005–2008: McNeese State
- 2009–2011: Louisiana (asst.)
- 2012–2015: Bradley (asst.)
- 2016–2017: Louisiana (AHC)
- 2019: Missouri (asst.)
- 2020–2021: Missouri (AHC)
- 2021–2024: Tennessee (asst.)
- 2025–present: Auburn (Co-HC)

Head coaching record
- Overall: 170–185–0 (.479)

Chris Malveaux is an American softball coach who, along with his wife Kate, is the co-head coach at Auburn. He previously served as the head coach at McNeese State.

== Coaching career ==
=== McNeese State ===
Malveaux began his coaching career at McNeese State, where he served as an assistant head coach from 2002 to 2004. He was promoted to head coach in 2005. During his first year as head coach he led the Cowgirls to the 2005 Southland Conference Tournament Championship and an NCAA Regional appearance. In four years at McNeese State he led the Cowgirls to a 108–133 overall record.

=== Louisiana ===
Malveaux served as an assistant coach at Louisiana from 2009 to 2011. On July 16, 2015, he returned to Louisiana as an associate head coach.

=== Bradley ===
Malveaux served as an assistant coach at Bradley University from 2012 to 2015.

=== Missouri ===
On June 28, 2018, Malveaux was named an assistant coach at Missouri.

=== Tennessee ===
On June 25, 2021, Malveaux and his wife Kate were both named assistant coaches at Tennessee.

=== Auburn ===
On June 5, 2024, Malveaux was named co-head coach at Auburn, along with his wife Kate.

== Personal life ==
Malveaux married former Bradley Braves softball player Kate Singler on December 20, 2014.

== Head coaching record ==
Record table
Season	Team	Overall	Conference	Standing	Postseason
McNeese State (Southland Conference) (2005–2008)
2005	McNeese State	34–35	12–15	6th	NCAA Regional
2006	McNeese State	21–30	13–13	4th	
2007	McNeese State	30–32	16–11	5th	
2008	McNeese State	23–36	15–14	5th	
McNeese State:		108–133 (.448)	56–53 (.514)		
Auburn (Southeastern Conference) (2025–present)
2025	Auburn	35–24	6–18	T–11th	NCAA Regional
2026	Auburn	27–28	4–20	11th	
Auburn:		62–52 (.544)	10–38 (.208)		
Total:		170–185 (.479)			
National champion Postseason invitational champion Conference regular season champion Conference regular season and conference tournament champion Division regular season champion Division regular season and conference tournament champion Conference tournament champion
