= 2017 NCAA Division I softball tournament =

- Teams: 64
- Finals site: ASA Hall of Fame Stadium; Oklahoma City
- Champions: Oklahoma (4th title)
- Runner-up: Florida (8th WCWS Appearance)
- Winning coach: Patty Gasso (4th title)
- MOP: Shay Knighten (Oklahoma)

The 2017 NCAA Division I softball tournament was held from May 18 through June 7, 2017, as the final part of the 2017 NCAA Division I softball season. The 64 participating NCAA Division I college softball teams were selected out of an eligible 293 teams on May 14, 2017. Thirty-two teams were awarded automatic bids as champions of their conferences, and the remaining 32 were selected at-large by the NCAA Division I softball selection committee. The tournament culminated with eight teams playing in the 2017 Women's College World Series at ASA Hall of Fame Stadium in Oklahoma City. Oklahoma would repeat as National Champions, defeating Florida in 2 games and 17 innings in the first game. Oklahoma became the lowest seeded team to ever win the National Championship, winning as the 10 seed.

== Automatic bids ==
The Big West, Mountain West, Pac-12, and West Coast Conference bids were awarded to the regular-season champion. All other conferences have the automatic bid go to the conference tournament winner.

Conference	School	Best finish	Reference
America East	Albany	Regionals (2005, 2006, 2007, 2011, 2014)	
American	Tulsa	Regionals (2006, 2008, 2009, 2011, 2014)	
ACC	Florida State	WCWS (1987, 1990, 1991, 1992, 1993, 2002, 2004, 2014, 2016)	
A-10	Fordham	Regionals (2010, 2011, 2013, 2014, 2015, 2016)	
ASUN	USC Upstate	Regionals (2013, 2014, 2015, 2016)	
Big 12	Oklahoma	1st (2000, 2013, 2016)	
Big East	DePaul	WCWS (1999, 2000, 2005, 2007)	
Big Sky	Montana	1st Appearance	
Big South	Longwood	Regionals (2013, 2015, 2016)	
Big Ten	Minnesota	WCWS; 1976, 1978	
Big West	Cal State Fullerton	1st (1986)	
Colonial	James Madison	Super Regionals (2016)	
Conference USA	Louisiana Tech	WCWS (1983, 1985, 1986)	
Horizon League	UIC	WCWS (1994)	
Ivy League	Princeton	WCWS (1995, 1996)	
MAC	Kent State	WCWS (1990)	
MAAC	Fairfield	Regionals (2015)	
MEAC	Florida A&M	Regionals (1995, 1997, 1998, 1999, 2005, 2006, 2009, 2014, 2015, 2016)	
MVC	Southern Illinois	WCWS (1970, 1977, 1978, 1991)	
Mountain West	San Jose State	Regionals (2013)	
Northeastern	Saint Francis (PA)	1st Appearance	
OVC	Jacksonville State	Super Regionals (2009)	
Pac-12	Arizona	1st (1991, 1993, 1994, 1996, 1997, 2001, 2006, 2007)	
Patriot League	Lehigh	Regionals (1993, 1994, 1995, 1996, 2001, 2004, 2005, 2006, 2008, 2009, 2011, 2012, 2015)	
SEC	Ole Miss	Regionals (2016)	
SoCon	East Tennessee State	1st Appearance	
Southland	McNeese State	Regionals (1994, 2005, 2010, 2016)	
SWAC	Texas Southern	Regionals (2014, 2015)	
Summit League	North Dakota State	Super Regionals (2009)	
Sun Belt	Louisiana–Lafayette	WCWS (1993, 1995, 1996, 2003, 2008, 2014)	
WAC	New Mexico State	Regionals (2011, 2015)	
WCC	BYU	Super Regionals (2010)	

== National seeds ==
16 National Seeds were announced on the Selection Show Sunday, May 14 at 10 p.m. EDT on ESPN2. The 16 national seeds host the Regionals. Teams in italics advanced to Super Regionals. Teams in bold advance to Women's College World Series.

1. **Florida**
2. Arizona
3. **Oregon**
4. Florida State
5. **UCLA**
6. **Washington**
7. Auburn
8. Tennessee

9. **Texas A&M**
10. **Oklahoma**
11. Utah
12. Ole Miss
13. **LSU**
14. Kentucky
15. **Baylor**
16. Alabama

== Regionals and Super Regionals ==
The Regionals took place May 18–21. One regional, Salt Lake City, took place May 18–20 because of BYU's no-Sunday-play policy; all other regionals occurred May 19–21. The Super Regionals took place from May 25–28.

=== Gainesville Super Regional ===
Round 1	Round 2
1	**Florida**	**9**^{(5)}
Florida A&M	0
1	**Florida**	**2**
Oklahoma State	0
FIU	0
**Oklahoma State**	**2**
Gainesville Regional
Florida A&M	0
**FIU**	**3**
**Oklahoma State**	**5**
FIU	0
16	**Alabama**	**5**
Albany	1
16	**Alabama**	**1**^{(9)}
Minnesota	0
**Minnesota**	**11**^{(5)}
Louisiana Tech	3
Tuscaloosa Regional
Albany	1
**Louisiana Tech**	**8**
**Minnesota**	**5**^{(9)}
Louisiana Tech	2

Regional Finals
1	**Florida**	0	**5**
Oklahoma State	**1**	0
16	**Alabama**	**1**	—
Minnesota	0	—

Super Regionals
1	**Florida**	0	**2**	**2**
16	Alabama	**3**	0	1

=== Knoxville Super Regional ===
Round 1	Round 2
9	**Texas A&M**	**14**^{(5)}
Texas Southern	0
9	**Texas A&M**	**3**
Texas State	1
Texas	1
**Texas State**	**2**^{(12)}
College Station Regional
Texas Southern	0
**Texas**	**8**^{(5)}
Texas State	3
**Texas**	**6**
8	**Tennessee**	**5**
Longwood	0
8	**Tennessee**	**7**
USC Upstate	3
Ohio State	3
**USC Upstate**	**7**
Knoxville Regional
**Longwood**	**3**
Ohio State	1
USC Upstate	2
**Longwood**	**4**

Regional Finals
9	**Texas A&M**	**3**	—
Texas	1	—
8	**Tennessee**	**3**	—
Longwood	0	—

Super Regionals
9	**Texas A&M**	1	**6**	**5**
8	Tennessee	**8**	5	3

=== Los Angeles Super Regional ===
Round 1	Round 2
5	**UCLA**	**8**^{(5)}
Lehigh	0
5	**UCLA**	**10**^{(6)}
San Jose State	2
**San Jose State**	**3**
Cal State Fullerton	0
Los Angeles Regional
Lehigh	8
**Cal State Fullerton**	**10**
San Jose State	0
**Cal State Fullerton**	**1**
12	**Ole Miss**	**8**^{(5)}
Southern Illinois	0
12	**Ole Miss**	**2**
Arizona State	0
**Arizona State**	**9**
North Carolina	3
Oxford Regional
Southern Illinois	0
**North Carolina**	**4**
Arizona State	2
**North Carolina**	**3**

Regional Finals
5	**UCLA**	**9**	—
Cal State Fullerton	1	—
12	**Ole Miss**	**7**	—
North Carolina	2	—

Super Regionals
5	**UCLA**	**8**^{(11)}	**1**	—
12	Ole Miss	7	0	—

=== Tallahassee Super Regional ===
Round 1	Round 2
13	**LSU**	**2**
Fairfield	1
13	LSU	2
**Louisiana–Lafayette**	**4**
McNeese State	0
**Louisiana–Lafayette**	**6**
Baton Rouge Regionals
Fairfield	2
**McNeese State**	**6**
13	**LSU**	**10**
McNeese State	1
4	**Florida State**	**3**
Princeton	0
4	**Florida State**	**7**
Georgia	1
**Georgia**	**4**
Jacksonville State	2
Tallahassee Regionals
Princeton	2
**Jacksonville State**	**10**^{(6)}
**Georgia**	**8**
Jacksonville State	2

Regional Finals
Louisiana–Lafayette	1	1
13	**LSU**	**6**	**5**
4	**Florida State**	**8**	—
Georgia	5	—

Super Regionals
13	**LSU**	1	**1**	**6**
4	Florida State	**3**	0	4

=== Eugene Super Regional ===
Round 1	Round 2
3	**Oregon**	**13**^{(5)}
UIC	0
3	**Oregon**	**6**^{(8)}
Wisconsin	5
**Wisconsin**	**7**
Missouri	2
Eugene Regional
**UIC**	**5**
Missouri	4
**Wisconsin**	**2**
UIC	0
14	**Kentucky**	**6**
DePaul	0
14	**Kentucky**	**1**
Illinois	0
**Illinois**	**3**^{(12)}
Marshall	2
Lexington Regional
DePaul	1
**Marshall**	**2**^{(8)}
**Illinois**	**10**^{(5)}
Marshall	2

Regional Finals
3	**Oregon**	**9**	—
Wisconsin	0	—
14	**Kentucky**	**4**	—
Illinois	2	—

Super Regionals
3	**Oregon**	**4**	**6**	—
14	Kentucky	0	5	—

=== Seattle Super Regional ===
Round 1	Round 2
11	**Utah**	**10**^{(5)}
Fordham	0
11	**Utah**	**3**
BYU	2
Mississippi State	0
**BYU**	**8**^{(6)}
Salt Lake City Regional
Mississippi State	3
**Fordham**	**9**
**BYU**	**12**^{(5)}
Fordham	1
6	**Washington**	**8**^{(5)}
Montana	0
6	**Washington**	**12**^{(5)}
Michigan	4
**Michigan**	**3**
Fresno State	1
Seattle Regional
Montana	0
**Fresno State**	**7**
**Michigan**	**4**
Fresno State	0

Regional Finals
11	**Utah**	**14**^{(6)}	—
BYU	0	—
6	**Washington**	**4**	—
Michigan	2	—

Super Regionals
11	Utah	4	**9**	1
6	**Washington**	**10**	8	**2**

=== Auburn Super Regional ===
Round 1	Round 2
7	**Auburn**	**11**^{(5)}
East Tennessee State	0
7	**Auburn**	**4**^{(9)}
California	3
Notre Dame	2
**California**	**6**
Auburn Regional
East Tennessee State	6
**Notre Dame**	**7**^{(8)}
**California**	**5**
Notre Dame	3
10	Oklahoma	2
**North Dakota State**	**3**^{(9)}
North Dakota State	1
**Tulsa**	**2**
Arkansas	4
**Tulsa**	**5**
Norman Regional
10	**Oklahoma**	**5**
Arkansas	3
North Dakota State	2
10	**Oklahoma**	**10**^{(6)}

Regional Finals
7	**Auburn**	**8**	—
California	2	—
Tulsa	4	0
10	**Oklahoma**	**6**^{(10)}	**3**

Super Regionals
7	Auburn	0	2	—
10	**Oklahoma**	**4**	**5**	—

=== Tucson Super Regional ===
Round 1	Round 2
15	**Baylor**	**1**
Kent State	0
15	**Baylor**	**4**
James Madison	2
Oregon State	2
**James Madison**	**3**
Waco Regional
**Kent State**	**2**
Oregon State	1
**James Madison**	**4**
Kent State	0
2	**Arizona**	**11**^{(5)}
New Mexico State	0
2	**Arizona**	**5**
South Carolina	0
Saint Francis (PA)	2
**South Carolina**	**12**^{(5)}
Tucson Regional
New Mexico State	4
**Saint Francis (PA)**	**8**
**South Carolina**	**3**
Saint Francis (PA)	1

Regional Finals
15	**Baylor**	**1**	—
James Madison	0	—
2	**Arizona**	**9**	—
South Carolina	0	—

Super Regionals
15	**Baylor**	2	**6**	**6**
2	Arizona	**3**	4	5

== Women's College World Series ==
The Women's College World Series was held June 1 through June 7, 2017, in Oklahoma City.

=== Participants ===
School	Conference	Record (conference)	Head coach	WCWS appearances† (including 2025 WCWS)	WCWS best finish†*	WCWS W–L record† (excluding 2025 WCWS)
Baylor	Big 12	48–13 (13–5)	Glenn Moore	4 (last: 2014)	3rd (2011, 2014)	5–6
Florida	SEC	55–8 (20–3)	Tim Walton	8 (last: 2015)	1st (2014, 2015)	22–12
LSU	SEC	47–20 (12–12)	Beth Torina	6 (last: 2016)	3rd (2001, 2004, 2015, 2016)	10–10
Oklahoma	Big 12	56–9 (17–1)	Patty Gasso	11 (last: 2016)	1st (2000, 2013, 2016)	22–15
Oregon	Pac-12	52-6 (17-6)	Mike White	5 (last: 2015)	3rd (2014)	4-8
Texas A&M	SEC	47–11 (16–7)	Jo Evans	8 (last: 2008)	1st (1983, 1987)	19–13
UCLA	Pac-12	47–13 (16–8)	Kelly Inouye-Perez	27 (last: 2016)	1st (1982, 1984, 1985, 1988, 1989, 1990; 1992, 1995*, 1999, 2003, 2004, 2010)	95–32
Washington	Pac-12	48–12 (16–8)	Heather Tarr	12 (last: 2013)	1st (2009)	19–17

† = From NCAA Division I Softball Championship Results

=== Bracket ===
First round
1	**Florida**	**8**^{(5)}
9	Texas A&M	0
13	**LSU**	**2**
5	UCLA	1
9	Texas A&M	2
5	**UCLA**	**8**
3	Oregon	1
6	**Washington**	**3**
15	Baylor	3
10	**Oklahoma**	**6**
3	**Oregon**	**7**
15	Baylor	4

Second round
1	**Florida**	**7**
13	LSU	0
6	**Washington**	**1**
5	UCLA	0
6	Washington	1
10	**Oklahoma**	**3**
13	LSU	1
3	**Oregon**	**4**

Semifinals
1	**Florida**	**5**	—
6	Washington	2	—
10	**Oklahoma**	**4**	—
3	Oregon	2	—

Finals
1	Florida	5	4	—
10	**Oklahoma**	**7**^{(17)}	**5**	—

=== Game results ===
Game	Time*	Matchup^{#}	Television	Attendance
Thursday, June 1
1	11:00 a.m.	(9) Texas A&M vs. (1) Florida	ESPN	8,428
2	1:30 p.m.	(5) UCLA vs. (13) LSU	ESPN	8,428
3	6:00 p.m.	(6) Washington vs. (3) Oregon	ESPN2	8,874
4	8:30 p.m.	(10) Oklahoma vs. (15) Baylor	ESPN2	8,874
Friday, June 2
5	6:00 p.m.	(1) Florida vs. (13) LSU	ESPN	9,658
6	8:30 p.m.	(6) Washington vs. (10) Oklahoma	ESPN	9,658
Saturday, June 3
7	11:00 a.m.	(9) Texas A&M vs. (5) UCLA	ESPN	8,696
8	1:30 p.m.	(3) Oregon vs. (15) Baylor	ESPN	8,696
9	6:00 p.m.	(5) UCLA vs. (6) Washington	ESPN	9,076
10	8:30 p.m.	(3) Oregon vs. (13) LSU	ESPN	9,076
Sunday, June 4
11	12:00 p.m.	(1) Florida vs. (6) Washington	ESPN	9,419
12	2:30 p.m.	(10) Oklahoma vs. (3) Oregon	ESPN	9,419
Monday, June 5
Finals, G1	6:00 p.m.	(1) Florida vs. (10) Oklahoma	ESPN	8,337
Tuesday, June 6
Finals, G2	7:00 p.m.	(1) Florida vs. (10) Oklahoma	ESPN	8,507
*Game times in CDT. (#) – Rankings denote tournament seed.

=== Finals ===
==== Game 1 ====
June 5, 2017 – 6:00 p.m. (CDT) at ASA Hall of Fame Stadium in Oklahoma City, Oklahoma
Team	1	2	3	4	5	6	7	8	9	10	11	12	13	14	15	16	17	R	H	E
**Oklahoma**	0	0	0	0	1	1	0	0	0	0	0	2	0	0	0	0	3	**7**	**10**	**2**
Florida	0	0	0	1	0	0	1	0	0	0	0	2	0	0	0	0	1	**5**	**12**	**0**
WP: Paige Lowary (16–3) LP: Kelly Barnhill (26–4); Home runs: OKLA: Nicole Mendes, Falepolima Aviu, Shay Knighten; FLA: None; Attendance: 8,337; Boxscore

==== Game 2 ====
June 6, 2017 – 7:00 p.m. (CDT) at ASA Hall of Fame Stadium in Oklahoma City, Oklahoma
Team	1	2	3	4	5	6	7	R	H	E
Florida	0	3	1	0	0	0	0	**4**	**6**	**1**
**Oklahoma**	1	4	0	0	0	0	x	**5**	**8**	**1**
WP: Mariah Lopez (18–1) LP: Aleshia Ocasio (8–1) Sv: Paige Lowary (11); Home runs: FLA: Sophia Reynoso, Chelsea Herndon; OKLA: Nicole Mendes; Attendance: 8,507; Boxscore

=== All-tournament Team ===
The following players were members of the Women's College World Series All-Tournament Team.

Position	Player	School
P	Kelly Barnhill	Florida
P	Delanie Gourley	Florida
P	Paige Lowary	Oklahoma
P	Paige Parker	Oklahoma
IF	**Shay Knighten (MOP)**	Oklahoma
IF	Ali Aguilar	Washington
IF	Mia Camuso	Oregon
IF	Alexis Mack	Oregon
OF	Amanda Lorenz	Florida
OF	Justine McLean	Florida
U	Nicole Mendes	Oklahoma
U	Aleshia Ocasio	Florida

== Record by conference ==
Conference	# of Bids	Record	Win %	RF	SR	WS	NS	F	NC
Big 12	4	23–10	.697	4	2	2	1	1	1
SEC	13	39–27	.591	10	8	3	1	1	–
Pac-12	8	30–15	.667	6	5	3	2	–	–
ACC	3	7–6	.538	2	1	–	–	–	–
Big Ten	5	8–10	.444	4	–	–	–	–	–
American	1	2–2	.500	1	–	–	–	–	–
Sun Belt	2	3–4	.429	1	–	–	–	–	–
Big South	1	2–2	.500	1	–	–	–	–	–
Big West	1	2–2	.500	1	–	–	–	–	–
CAA	1	2–2	.500	1	–	–	–	–	–
WCC	1	2–2	.500	1	–	–	–	–	–
C-USA	3	3–6	.333	–	–	–	–	–	–
MWC	2	2–4	.333	–	–	–	–	–	–
Other	19	8–38	.174	–	–	–	–	–	–

The columns RF, SR, WS, NS, F, and NC respectively stand for the Regional Finals, Super Regionals, College World Series Teams, National Semi-Finals, Finals, and National Champion.

== Media coverage ==
=== Radio ===
Westwood One provided nationwide radio coverage of the championship series. It was streamed online at westwoodsports.com, through TuneIn, and on SiriusXM. Kevin Kugler and Leah Amico provided the call for Westwood One.

=== Television ===
ESPN holds exclusive rights to the tournament. They aired games across ESPN, ESPN2, ESPNU, SEC Network, ESPN3 and Longhorn Network. For the first time in the history of the women's softball tournament ESPN covered every regional.

==== Broadcast assignments ====
Regionals

- Salt Lake: Alex Perlman & Megan Turk
- Gainesville: Melissa Lee & Lee Dakich
- Lexington: Jenn Hildreth & Carol Bruggeman
- Norman: Alex Loeb & Megan Willis
- Baton Rouge: Lyn Rollins & Yvette Girouard
- Knoxville: Lisa Byington & Jennie Ritter
- Auburn: Mark Neely & Jenny Dalton-Hill
- Tuscaloosa: Pam Ward & Cheri Kempf

Super Regionals

- Gainesville: Eric Collins & Amanda Scarborough
- Los Angeles: Beth Mowins, Jessica Mendoza, Michele Smith, & Holly Rowe
- Auburn: Mark Neely & Jenny Dalton-Hill
- Tallahassee: Jenn Hildreth & Carol Bruggeman

Women's College World Series

- Adam Amin, Amanda Scarborough, & Laura Rutledge (afternoons, early Fri)
- Beth Mowins, Jessica Mendoza, Michele Smith, & Holly Rowe (evenings minus early Fri)

Regionals

- Tallahassee: Eric Frede & Leah Amico
- Waco: Brenda VanLengen & Francesca Enea
- College Station: Tyler Denning & Erin Miller
- Oxford: Eric Collins & Amanda Scarborough
- Tucson: Dean Linke & Kenzie Fowler
- Eugene: Trey Bender & Danielle Lawrie
- Los Angeles: Tracy Warren & Amanda Freed
- Seattle: Beth Mowins & Michele Smith

Super Regionals

- Knoxville: Alex Loeb & Megan Willis
- Eugene: Trey Bender & Danielle Lawrie
- Tucson: Pam Ward & Cheri Kempf
- Seattle: Courtney Lyle & Lee Dakich

Women's College World Series Finals

- Beth Mowins, Jessica Mendoza, Michele Smith, & Holly Rowe
