= Sherri Parker Lee Stadium =

Softball stadium in Knoxville, Tennessee

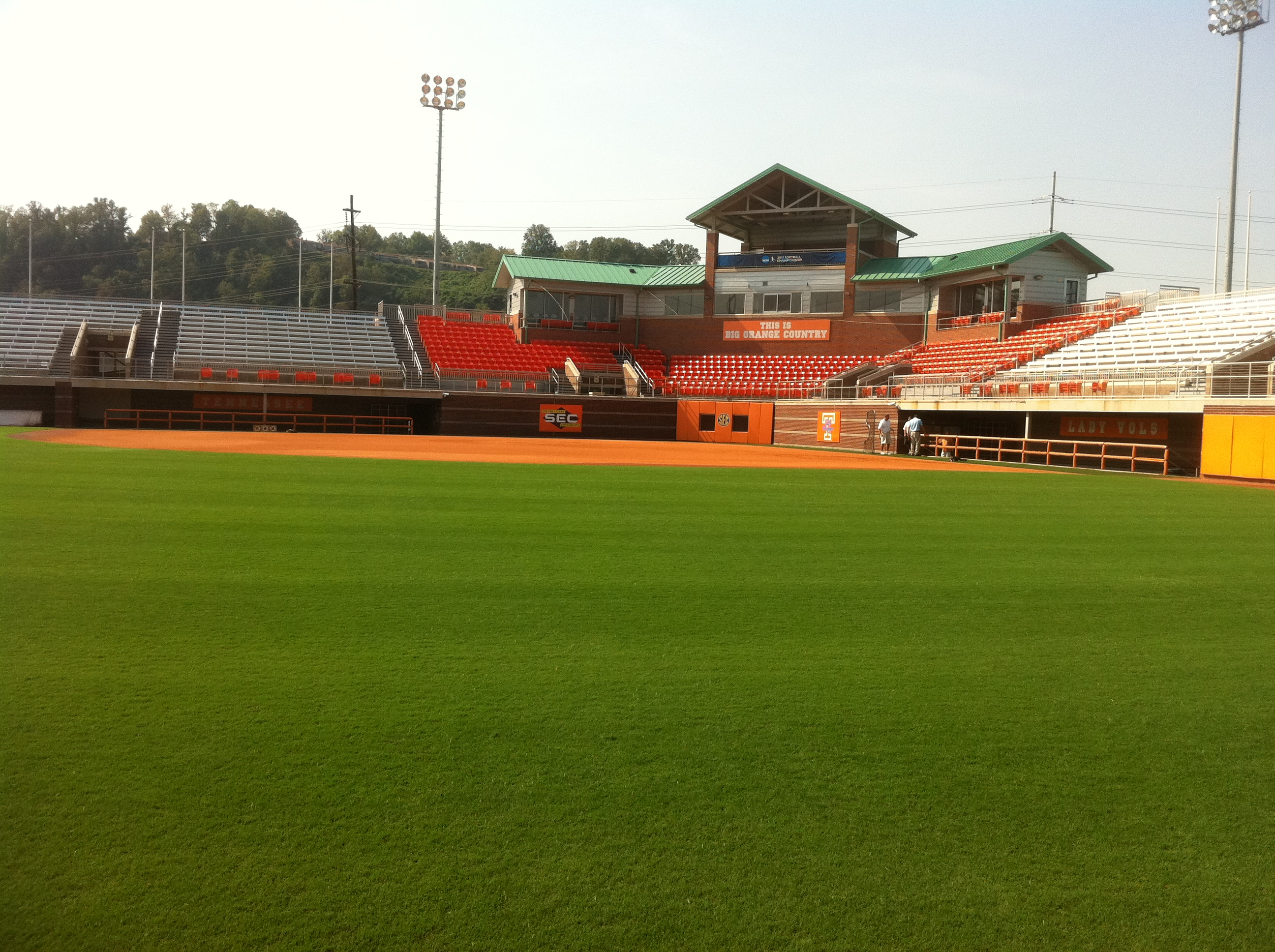
- View of the stadium from left field.
- Address: 2323 Stephenson Dr; Knoxville, Tennessee; United States
- Coordinates: 35.9457°N 83.9348°W
- Owner: University of Tennessee
- Operator: University of Tennessee
- Capacity: 2,200
- Record attendance: 2,548 (vs. Texas A&M, 2017)
- Field size: Left Field: 200 ft (61 m); Center Field: 220 ft (67 m); Right Field: 200 ft (61 m)
- Surface: Bermuda grass
- Opened: February 5, 2008

Tenants
- Tennessee Lady Vols (NCAA) (2008-present)

Website
- Sherri Parker Lee Stadium

Sherri Parker Lee Stadium is a softball stadium in Knoxville, Tennessee. It is the home field of the University of Tennessee Volunteers college softball team. The stadium opened in 2008 and holds 2,200 people. The Stadium is named after UT graduate Sherri Lee.

In 2010, the then-Lady Volunteers ranked 16th in Division I college softball in attendance, averaging 710 per home game.

In 2011, Sherri Parker Lee Stadium was recognized as the 2011 NFCA/Stabilizer Solutions Field of the Year Award Winner.
