= List of Arizona State Sun Devils head softball coaches =

The Arizona State Sun Devils softball program is a college softball team that represents Arizona State University in the Pac-12 Conference in the National Collegiate Athletic Association. The team has had 6 head coaches since it started playing organized softball in the 1967 season. The current coach is Megan Bartlett, who took over the head coaching position in 2023.

== Key ==
General
#	Number of coaches (Note: A running total of the number of head coaches.)
GC	Games coached

Overall
OW	Wins
OL	Losses
OT	Ties
O%	Winning percentage

Conference (Note: Arizona State played as an independent from 1967–1974, and was a member of the Intermountain Conference from 1975 through 1979. They then were members of the Western Collegiate Athletic Association from 1980 through 1985. They moved to the Pacific-West Conference in 1986. The Pac-12 Conference, then known as the Pac-10, began sponsoring women's sports in 1987.)
CW	Wins
CL	Losses
CT	Ties
C%	Winning percentage

Postseason (Note: Postseason play involving the NCAA Division I Softball Championship or AIAW Women's College World Series.)
PA	Total Appearances (Note: Postseason appearances include seasons with NCAA Division I Softball Championship bids since the tournament began in 1982.)
PW	Total Wins
PL	Total Losses
WA	Women's College World Series appearances (Note: Women's College World Series appearances include seasons with WCWS bids since the tournament began in 1969.)
WW	Women's College World Series Wins
WL	Women's College World Series Losses

Championships
CC	Conference regular season
NC	National championships (Note: Women's College World Series sponsored by either the AIAW or NCAA.)

== Coaches ==
List of head softball coaches showing season(s) coached, overall records, conference records, postseason records, championships and selected awards (Note: Statistics correct as of the end of the 2025 NCAA Division I softball season.)
#	Name	Term	GC	OW	OL	OT	O%	CW	CL	CT	C%	PA	WA	CCs	NCs
1	Mary Littlewood	1967–1989	759	536	223	0	.706	139	83	0	.626	16	9	3	2
2	Linda Wells	1990–2005	978	563	415	0	.576	139	230	0	.377	11	2	0	0
3	Clint Myers	2006–2013	529	427	102	0	.807	113	59	0	.657	8	7	2	1
4	Craig Nicholson	2014–2015	117	82	34	1	.705	27	18	1	.598	2	0	0	0
5	Wagner/Olivarez	2016	58	32	26	0	.552	6	17	0	.261	1	0	0	0
6	Trisha Ford	2017–2022	301	212	89	0	.704	70	47	0	.598	5	1	1	0
7	Megan Bartlett	2023–present	165	77	78	0	.497	23	49	0	.319	1	—	—	—
