= 2011 NCAA Division I softball season =

American college softball season

- Defending Champions: UCLA

Tournament

Women's College World Series
- Champions: Arizona State (2nd title)
- Runners-up: Florida (4th WCWS Appearance)
- Winning Coach: Clint Myers (2nd title)
- WCWS MOP: Dallas Escobedo & Michelle Moultrie (Arizona State & Florida)

Seasons
- ← 2010 2012 →

The 2011 NCAA Division I softball season, play of college softball in the United States organized by the National Collegiate Athletic Association (NCAA) at the Division I level, began in February 2011. The season progressed through the regular season, many conference tournaments and championship series, and concluded with the 2011 NCAA Division I softball tournament and 2011 Women's College World Series. The Women's College World Series, consisting of the eight remaining teams in the NCAA Tournament and held in Oklahoma City at ASA Hall of Fame Stadium, ended on June 7, 2011.

== Conference standings ==
2011 Big 12 Conference softball standings
	Conf.				Overall
Team	W		L	PCT	W		L	PCT
No. 6 Missouri ‍†‍‍^{y}	15	–	3	.833	53	–	10	.841
No. 20 Texas ‍‍‍^{y}	14	–	4	.778	46	–	10	.821
No. 14 Texas A&M ‍‍‍^{y}	13	–	5	.722	44	–	15	.746
No. 4 Baylor ‍‍‍^{y}	11	–	7	.611	47	–	15	.758
No. 7 Oklahoma ‍‍‍^{y}	10	–	8	.556	43	–	19	.694
No. 21 Nebraska ‍‍‍^{y}	9	–	9	.500	41	–	14	.745
No. 8 Oklahoma State ‍‍‍^{y}	8	–	10	.444	42	–	20	.677
Texas Tech ‍‍‍^{y}	5	–	13	.278	42	–	16	.724
Iowa State ‍‍‍	3	–	15	.167	21	–	28	.429
Kansas ‍‍‍	2	–	16	.111	31	–	22	.585
† – Conference champion y – Invited to the NCAA tournament Rankings from NFCA

2011 Southeastern Conference softball standings
	Conf.				Overall
Team	W		L	PCT	W		L	PCT
Eastern
No. 2 Florida ^{x}‍‍‍^{y}	21	–	7	.750	56	–	13	.812
No. 18 Tennessee ‍‍‡‍^{y}	20	–	8	.714	49	–	12	.803
No. 9 Georgia ‍‍‍^{y}	17	–	9	.654	51	–	14	.785
No. 13 Kentucky ‍‍‍^{y}	14	–	9	.609	40	–	16	.714
South Carolina ‍‍‍	6	–	22	.214	26	–	30	.464
Western
No. 3 Alabama ^{x}‍‍‍^{y}	19	–	6	.760	53	–	11	.828
No. 22 LSU ‍‍‍^{y}	19	–	9	.679	40	–	18	.690
Auburn ‍‍‍^{y}	15	–	13	.536	40	–	19	.678
Mississippi State ‍‍‍	10	–	18	.357	24	–	32	.429
Ole Miss ‍‍‍	3	–	23	.115	14	–	39	.264
Arkansas ‍‍‍	3	–	23	.115	13	–	39	.250
x – Division champion ‡ – Tournament champion y – Invited to the NCAA Tournament; As of June 30, 2011; Rankings from NFCA/USA Today

2011 Big Ten Conference softball standings
	Conf.				Overall
Team	W		L	PCT	W		L	PCT
No. 17 Michigan ‍†‍‍^{y}	18	–	2	.900	53	–	6	.898
Indiana ‍‍‍^{y}	17	–	3	.850	37	–	18	.673
Illinois ‍‍‍	12	–	8	.600	27	–	22	.551
Penn State ‍‍‍^{y}	11	–	8	.579	31	–	24	.564
Purdue ‍‍‍	8	–	9	.471	30	–	18	.625
Wisconsin ‍‍‍	9	–	11	.450	30	–	23	.566
Minnesota ‍‍‍	9	–	11	.450	31	–	24	.564
Iowa ‍‍‍	9	–	11	.450	27	–	24	.529
Michigan State ‍‍‍	6	–	14	.300	27	–	27	.500
Northwestern ‍‍‍	5	–	13	.278	23	–	20	.535
Ohio State ‍‍‍	3	–	17	.150	14	–	37	.275
† – Conference champion y – Invited to the NCAA tournament As of May 22, 2011; Rankings from NFCA

2011 Southland Conference softball standings
	Conf.				Overall
Team	W		L	PCT	W		L	PCT
Texas A&M–Corpus Christi ** ‍‍‍	21	–	9	.700	41	–	19	.683
Texas–Arlington ‍‍‍	20	–	10	.667	33	–	25	.569
Texas State ‡ ‍‍‍	20	–	10	.667	33	–	25	.569
McNeese State ‍‍‍	18	–	12	.600	31	–	29	.517
Texas–San Antonio ‍‍‍	17	–	13	.567	28	–	27	.509
Northwestern State ‍‍‍	15	–	15	.500	32	–	25	.561
Sam Houston ‍‍‍	14	–	15	.483	22	–	32	.407
Central Arkansas ‍‍‍	12	–	18	.400	26	–	30	.464
Southeastern Louisiana ‍‍‍	11	–	19	.367	22	–	30	.423
Stephen F. Austin ‍‍‍	9	–	21	.300	14	–	36	.280
Nicholls ‍‍‍	7	–	22	.241	15	–	37	.288
‡ – SLC Tournament Champion; **Southland Tournament #1 seed champion As of May 22, 2011; Rankings from USA Today/NFCA Coaches

2011 Pacific-10 Conference softball standings
	Conf.				Overall
Team	W		L	PCT	W		L	PCT
Arizona State ‍†‍‍^{y}	17	–	4	.810	60	–	6	.909
California ‍‍‍^{y}	15	–	6	.714	45	–	13	.776
Oregon ‍‍‍^{y}	11	–	10	.524	42	–	16	.724
Arizona ‍‍‍^{y}	11	–	10	.524	43	–	18	.705
Stanford ‍‍‍^{y}	10	–	11	.476	42	–	17	.712
Washington ‍‍‍^{y}	9	–	12	.429	37	–	16	.698
UCLA ‍‍‍^{y}	9	–	12	.429	36	–	19	.655
Oregon State ‍‍‍	2	–	19	.095	19	–	27	.413
† – Conference champion y – Invited to the NCAA tournament As of July 30, 2011; Rankings from Coaches' Poll

2011 Sun Belt Conference softball standings
	Conf.				Overall
Team	W		L	PCT	W		L	PCT
No. 23 Louisiana-Lafayette ‍†‍‡‍^{y}	19	–	5	.792	51	–	11	.823
Florida Atlantic ‍‍‍	15	–	9	.625	34	–	25	.576
South Alabama ‍‍‍	14	–	10	.583	37	–	17	.685
FIU ‍‍‍	14	–	10	.583	31	–	27	.534
Troy ‍‍‍	11	–	12	.478	32	–	27	.542
Louisiana-Monroe ‍‍‍	10	–	14	.417	27	–	28	.491
Western Kentucky ‍‍‍	9	–	15	.375	30	–	29	.508
Middle Tennessee ‍‍‍	8	–	16	.333	18	–	33	.353
North Texas ‍‍‍	7	–	16	.304	22	–	30	.423
† – Conference champion ‡ – Tournament champion y – Invited to the NCAA tournament As of July 4, 2019; Rankings from

== Women's College World Series ==
The 2010 NCAA Women's College World Series took place from June 2 to June 7, 2011, in Oklahoma City.

First round
1	Arizona State	3
9	Oklahoma	1
4	Florida	6
5	Missouri	2
9	Oklahoma	1
5	Missouri	4
11	Baylor	1
Oklahoma State	0
2	Alabama	1
7	California	0
Oklahoma State	2
7	California	6

Second round
1	Arizona State	6
4	Florida	5
11	Baylor	1
5	Missouri	0
11	Baylor	0
2	Alabama	3
4	Florida	5
7	California	2

Semifinals
1	Arizona State	4	—
11	Baylor	0	—
2	Alabama	2	2
4	Florida	16	9

Finals
1	Arizona State	14	7	—
4	Florida	4	2	—

== Season leaders ==
Batting

- Batting average: .504 – Stephanie Thompson, Brown Bears
- RBIs: 101 – Christi Orgeron, Louisiana Ragin' Cajuns
- Home runs: 24 – Hoku Nohara, New Mexico State Aggies

Pitching

- Wins: 40-10 – Jolene Henderson, California Golden Bears
- ERA: 0.95 (37 ER/271.1 IP) – Chelsea Thomas, Missouri Tigers
- Strikeouts: 498 – Sara Plourde, UMass Minutewomen

== Records ==
Freshman class consecutive games hit streak: 36 – Stephanie Tofft, Northern Illinois Huskies; March 4-May 1, 2011

Junior class RBIs: 101 – Christi Orgeron, Louisiana Ragin' Cajuns

== Awards ==
- USA Softball Collegiate Player of the Year:

Ashley Hansen, Stanford Cardinal

YEAR	G	AB	R	H	BA	RBI	HR	3B	2B	TB	SLG	BB	SO	SB	SBA
2011	59	192	51	95	.495	45	9	3	25	153	.797%	26	5	11	13

- Honda Sports Award Softball:

Kelsey Bruder, Florida Gators

YEAR	G	AB	R	H	BA	RBI	HR	3B	2B	TB	SLG	BB	SO	SB	SBA
2011	69	199	79	77	.387	71	19	2	14	152	.764%	48	28	9	9

== All America Teams ==
The following players were members of the All-American Teams.

First Team

Position	Player	Class	School
P	Dallas Escobedo	FR.	Arizona State Sun Devils
P	Jolene Henderson	JR.	California Golden Bears
P	Chelsea Thomas	SO.	Missouri Tigers
C	Kaylyn Castillo	SR.	Arizona State Sun Devils
1B	Megan Bush	SR.	Florida Gators
2B	Lauren Gibson	SO.	Tennessee Lady Vols
3B	Amanda Chidester	JR.	Michigan Wolverines
SS	Ashley Hansen	JR.	Stanford Cardinal
OF	Kayla Braud	SO.	Alabama Crimson Tide
OF	Brittany Lastrapes	SR.	Arizona Wildcats
OF	Kelsey Bruder	SR.	Florida Gators
UT	Jaclyn Traina	FR.	Alabama Crimson Tide
UT	Andrea Harrison	JR.	UCLA Bruins
AT-L	Katelyn Boyd	JR.	Arizona State Sun Devils
AT-L	Kelsi Dunne	SR.	Alabama Crimson Tide
AT-L	Adrienne Monka	JR.	Northwestern Wildcats
AT-L	Keilani Ricketts	SO.	Oklahoma Sooners
AT-L	Brittany Schutte	SO.	Florida Gators

Second Team

Position	Player	Class	School
P	Blaire Luna	SO.	Texas Longhorns
P	Kenzie Fowler	SO.	Arizona Wildcats
P	Hannah Rogers	FR.	Florida Gators
C	Jessica Shults	SO.	Oklahoma Sooners
1B	Hoku Nohara	SR.	New Mexico State Aggies
2B	Ashley Lane	SO.	Michigan Wolverines
3B	Brigette Del Ponte	SO.	Arizona Wildcats
SS	Kelsi Weseman	JR.	Georgia Tech Yellowjackets
OF	Raven Chavanne	SO.	Tennessee Lady Vols
OF	Ashley Fleming	JR.	Missouri Tigers
OF	Megan Wiggins	SR.	Georgia Bulldogs
UT	Melissa Dumezich	FR.	Texas A&M Aggies
UT	Nikia Williams	JR.	Washington Huskies
AT-L	Whitney Canion	SO.	Baylor Bears
AT-L	Alisa Goler	SR.	Georgia Bulldogs
AT-L	Whitney Larsen	SR.	Alabama Crimson Tide
AT-L	Jenn Salling	SR.	Washington Huskies
AT-L	Jordan Taylor	SR.	Michigan Wolverines

Third Team

Position	Player	Class	School
P	Jen Mineau	JR.	Fordham Rams
P	Ellen Renfroe	FR.	Tennessee Lady Vols
P	Sara Plourde	JR.	UMass Minutewomen
C	Taylor Edwards	FR.	Nebraska Cornhuskers
1B	Gabriele Bridges	SR.	ULL Ragin' Cajuns
2B	Aja Paculba	SR.	Florida Gators
3B	Heather Johnson	SR.	Notre Dame Fighting Irish
SS	Dani Leal	SR.	Baylor Bears
OF	Bree Evans	JR.	Michigan Wolverines
OF	Jamia Reid	JR.	California Golden Bears
OF	Rhea Taylor	SR.	Missouri Tigers
UT	Aimee Creger	FR.	Tulsa Hurricanes
UT	Dani Miller	JR.	Notre Dame Fighting Irish
AT-L	Lindsey Hansen	SR.	Michigan State Spartans
AT-L	Brittany Mack	JR.	LSU Tigers
AT-L	Michelle Moultrie	JR.	Florida Gators
AT-L	Christi Orgeron	JR.	ULL Ragin' Cajuns
AT-L	Danielle Zymkowitz	SR.	Illinois Fighting Illini
