= 2011 Arizona State Sun Devils softball team =

American college softball season

2011 Arizona State Sun Devils softball

National Champion NCAA Tempe Super Regional champion NCAA Tempe Regional champion Pacific-10 champion
- Conference: Pacific-10 Conference
- Record: 60–6 (17–4 Pac-10)
- Head coach: Clint Myers (6th season)
- Home stadium: Alberta B. Farrington Softball Stadium

2011 Pacific-10 Conference softball standings
	Conf.				Overall
Team	W		L	PCT	W		L	PCT
Arizona State ‍†‍‍^{y}	17	–	4	.810	60	–	6	.909
California ‍‍‍^{y}	15	–	6	.714	45	–	13	.776
Oregon ‍‍‍^{y}	11	–	10	.524	42	–	16	.724
Arizona ‍‍‍^{y}	11	–	10	.524	43	–	18	.705
Stanford ‍‍‍^{y}	10	–	11	.476	42	–	17	.712
Washington ‍‍‍^{y}	9	–	12	.429	37	–	16	.698
UCLA ‍‍‍^{y}	9	–	12	.429	36	–	19	.655
Oregon State ‍‍‍	2	–	19	.095	19	–	27	.413
† – Conference champion y – Invited to the NCAA tournament As of July 30, 2011; Rankings from Coaches' Poll

The 2011 Arizona State Sun Devils softball team represented Arizona State University in the 2011 NCAA Division I softball season. The Sun Devils were coached by Clint Myers, who led his sixth season. The Sun Devils finished with a record of 60–6. They played their home games at Alberta B. Farrington Softball Stadium and competed in the Pacific-10 Conference, where they finished first with a 17–4 record.

The Sun Devils were invited to the 2011 NCAA Division I softball tournament, where they swept the Regional and Super Regional and then completed a run through the Women's College World Series to claim their second NCAA Women's College World Series Championship.

== Roster ==
2011 Arizona State Sun Devils roster
Pitchers: 10 – Hillary Bach – junior; 12 - Dallas Escobedo – freshman; 99 – Mackenzie Popescue - (redshirt) Freshman; Catchers: 9 – Sarah Rice – senior; 16 – Lucy Aubrecht – freshman; 25 – Lacy Goodman – senior; 26 – Nikole Afusia – junior; 27 – Kaylyn Castillo – senior	Infielders: 2 – Bailey Wigness – freshman; 5 – Christina Zambrana – junior; 11 - Krista Donnenwirth – senior; 17 – Katelyn Boyd – junior; 18 – Michelle Nulliner – senior; 20 – Sam Parlich – sophomore; 24 – Breanna Kaye – freshman; 36 – Mandy Urfer – senior; 88 – Annie Lockwood – junior	Outfielders: 1 – Kayla Ketchum – sophomore; 4 – Mary Spiel – freshman; 8 – Lesley Rogers – senior; 22 – Talor Haro – junior; 33 – Alix Johnson – freshman; 48 – Lindsey Edgerton – freshman; 77 – Dani Rae - Lougheed – senior; Utility: 7 – Jessica Donovan – junior

== Schedule ==
Legend
	Arizona State win
	Arizona State loss
	Tie
*	Non-Conference game

2011 Arizona State Sun Devils softball game log
Regular season

February
Date	Opponent	Site/stadium	Score	Overall record	Pac-10 record
Feb 10	Western Michigan*	Alberta B. Farrington Softball Stadium • Tempe, AZ	W 17–0^{5}	1–0	
Feb 11	Cal Poly*	Alberta B. Farrington Softball Stadium • Tempe, AZ	W 6–5	2–0	
Feb 11	Oklahoma State*	Alberta B. Farrington Softball Stadium • Tempe, AZ	W 1–0	3–0	
Feb 12	Oklahoma*	Alberta B. Farrington Softball Stadium • Tempe, AZ	W 4–3	4–0	
Feb 12	Utah*	Alberta B. Farrington Softball Stadium • Tempe, AZ	L 1–3^{8}	4–1	
Feb 13	San Jose State*	Alberta B. Farrington Softball Stadium • Tempe, AZ	W 13–4^{6}	5–1	
Feb 18	Seattle*	Alberta B. Farrington Softball Stadium • Tempe, AZ	W 10–0^{5}	6–1	
Feb 18	Illinois State*	Alberta B. Farrington Softball Stadium • Tempe, AZ	W 13–4^{6}	7–1	
Feb 20	Idaho State*	Alberta B. Farrington Softball Stadium • Tempe, AZ	W 16–1^{5}	8–1	
Feb 20	Seattle*	Alberta B. Farrington Softball Stadium • Tempe, AZ	W 13–2^{5}	9–1	
Feb 25	Michigan State*	Alberta B. Farrington Softball Stadium • Tempe, AZ	W 6–2	10–1	
Feb 26	Michigan State*	Alberta B. Farrington Softball Stadium • Tempe, AZ	W 10–2^{5}	11–1	
Feb 26	Michigan State*	Alberta B. Farrington Softball Stadium • Tempe, AZ	W 5–2	12–1	

March
Date	Opponent	Site/stadium	Score	Overall record	Pac-10 record
Mar 4	East Carolina*	Alberta B. Farrington Softball Stadium • Tempe, AZ	W 11–0^{5}	13–1	
Mar 4	Northern Iowa*	Alberta B. Farrington Softball Stadium • Tempe, AZ	W 6–1	14–1	
Mar 5	Northern Colorado*	Alberta B. Farrington Softball Stadium • Tempe, AZ	W 9–0^{5}	15–1	
Mar 5	New Mexico State*	Alberta B. Farrington Softball Stadium • Tempe, AZ	W 17–0^{5}	16–1	
Mar 6	Creighton*	Alberta B. Farrington Softball Stadium • Tempe, AZ	W 11–1^{5}	17–1	
Mar 8	Creighton*	Alberta B. Farrington Softball Stadium • Tempe, AZ	W 10–0^{5}	18–1	
Mar 9	Florida Gulf Coast*	Alberta B. Farrington Softball Stadium • Tempe, AZ	W 7–0	19–1	
Mar 10	Campbell*	Alberta B. Farrington Softball Stadium • Tempe, AZ	W 13–4^{5}	20–1	
Mar 10	Florida Gulf Coast*	Alberta B. Farrington Softball Stadium • Tempe, AZ	W 11–1^{5}	21–1	
Mar 11	Howard*	Alberta B. Farrington Softball Stadium • Tempe, AZ	W 13–1^{5}	22–1	
Mar 12	Weber State*	Alberta B. Farrington Softball Stadium • Tempe, AZ	W 12–0	23–1	
Mar 12	Virginia Tech*	Alberta B. Farrington Softball Stadium • Tempe, AZ	W 10–3	24–1	
Mar 15	Western Illinois*	Alberta B. Farrington Softball Stadium • Tempe, AZ	W 10–0^{4}	25–1	
Mar 15	Western Illinois*	Alberta B. Farrington Softball Stadium • Tempe, AZ	W 12–4^{5}	26–1	
Mar 17	Penn State*	Alberta B. Farrington Softball Stadium • Tempe, AZ	W 5–1	27–1	
Mar 17	Michigan*	Alberta B. Farrington Softball Stadium • Tempe, AZ	L 0–1	27–2	
Mar 18	Pacific*	Alberta B. Farrington Softball Stadium • Tempe, AZ	W 4–3	28–2	
Mar 18	Louisiana–Lafayette*	Alberta B. Farrington Softball Stadium • Tempe, AZ	W 10–4	29–2	
Mar 19	Boise State*	Alberta B. Farrington Softball Stadium • Tempe, AZ	W 9–3	30–2	
Mar 25	UC Santa Barbara*	Alberta B. Farrington Softball Stadium • Tempe, AZ	W 8–0^{5}	31–2	
Mar 26	UC Santa Barbara*	Alberta B. Farrington Softball Stadium • Tempe, AZ	W 11–3^{5}	32–2	
Mar 27	UC Santa Barbara*	Alberta B. Farrington Softball Stadium • Tempe, AZ	W 9–1^{5}	33–2	

April
Date	Opponent	Site/stadium	Score	Overall record	Pac-10 record
Apr 1	at California	Levine-Fricke Field • Berkeley, CA	W 3–1	34–2	1–0
Apr 2	at California	Levine-Fricke Field • Berkeley, CA	W 7–2	35–2	2–0
Apr 3	at California	Levine-Fricke Field • Berkeley, CA	L 2–3	35–3	2–1
Apr 8	at Oregon	Howe Field • Eugene, OR	W 2–0	36–3	3–1
Apr 9	at Oregon	Howe Field • Eugene, OR	W 10–5	37–3	4–1
Apr 10	at Oregon	Howe Field • Eugene, OR	L 1–2	37–4	4–2
Apr 15	UCLA	Alberta B. Farrington Softball Stadium • Tempe, AZ	L 1–4	37–5	4–3
Apr 16	UCLA	Alberta B. Farrington Softball Stadium • Tempe, AZ	W 2–0	38–5	5–3
Apr 17	UCLA	Alberta B. Farrington Softball Stadium • Tempe, AZ	W 5–0	39–5	6–3
Apr 21	at Arizona	Rita Hillenbrand Memorial Stadium • Tucson, AZ	W 4–0	40–5	7–3
Apr 22	at Arizona	Rita Hillenbrand Memorial Stadium • Tucson, AZ	W 13–10	41–5	8–3
Apr 23	at Arizona	Rita Hillenbrand Memorial Stadium • Tucson, AZ	W 8–3	42–5	9–3
Apr 29	Oregon State	Alberta B. Farrington Softball Stadium • Tempe, AZ	W 1–0	43–5	10–3
Apr 30	Oregon State	Alberta B. Farrington Softball Stadium • Tempe, AZ	W 3–0	44–5	11–3

May
Date	Opponent	Site/stadium	Score	Overall record	Pac-10 record
May 1	Oregon State	Alberta B. Farrington Softball Stadium • Tempe, AZ	W 7–1	45–5	12–3
May 6	at Washington	Husky Softball Stadium • Seattle, WA	W 6–4	46–5	13–3
May 7	at Washington	Husky Softball Stadium • Seattle, WA	W 2–0	47–5	14–3
May 8	at Washington	Husky Softball Stadium • Seattle, WA	W 6–2	48–5	15–3
May 12	Stanford	Alberta B. Farrington Softball Stadium • Tempe, AZ	W 3–1	49–5	16–3
May 13	Stanford	Alberta B. Farrington Softball Stadium • Tempe, AZ	L 1–6	49–6	16–4
May 14	Stanford	Alberta B. Farrington Softball Stadium • Tempe, AZ	W 4–1	50–6	17–4

Postseason

NCAA Tempe Regional
Date	Opponent	Rank	Site/stadium	Score	Overall record	NCAAT record
May 20	North Dakota State	(1)	Alberta B. Farrington Softball Stadium • Tempe, AZ	W 10–0^{5}	51–6	1–0
May 21	Long Beach State	(1)	Alberta B. Farrington Softball Stadium • Tempe, AZ	W 8–0	52–6	2–0
May 22	San Diego State	(1)	Alberta B. Farrington Softball Stadium • Tempe, AZ	W 6–1	53–6	3–0

NCAA Tempe Super Regional
Date	Opponent	Rank	Site/stadium	Score	Overall record	SR Record
May 26	(16) Texas A&M	(1)	Alberta B. Farrington Softball Stadium • Tempe, AZ	W 3–2	54–6	1–0
May 27	(16) Texas A&M	(1)	Alberta B. Farrington Softball Stadium • Tempe, AZ	W 4–2	55–6	2–0

NCAA Women's College World Series
Date	Opponent	Rank	Site/stadium	Score	Overall record	WCWS Record
June 2	(9) Oklahoma	(1)	ASA Hall of Fame Stadium • Oklahoma City, OK	W 3–1	56–6	1–0
June 3	(4) Florida	(1)	ASA Hall of Fame Stadium • Oklahoma City, OK	W 6–5	57–6	2–0
June 5	(11) Baylor	(1)	ASA Hall of Fame Stadium • Oklahoma City, OK	W 4–0	58–6	3–0
June 6	(4) Florida	(1)	ASA Hall of Fame Stadium • Oklahoma City, OK	W 14–4	59–6	4–0
June 7	(4) Florida	(1)	ASA Hall of Fame Stadium • Oklahoma City, OK	W 7–2	60–6	5–0
