= 2026 Big 12 Conference softball tournament =

- Teams: 8
- Format: Single-elimination tournament
- Finals site: Devon Park; Oklahoma City, Oklahoma
- Champions: Arizona State (1st title)
- Runner-up: Texas Tech (2nd title game)
- Winning coach: Megan Bartlett (1st title)
- MVP: Kenzie Brown (Arizona State)

2026 Big 12 Conference softball standings
	Conf.						Overall
Team	W		L		T	PCT	W		L		T	PCT
No. 4 Texas Tech ‍†‍‍^{y}	21	–	3	–	0	.875	55	–	6	–	0	.902
No. 15 Oklahoma State ‍‍‍^{y}	16	–	8	–	0	.667	41	–	15	–	0	.732
No. 22 Arizona ‍‍‍^{y}	16	–	8	–	0	.667	37	–	18	–	0	.673
No. 23 UCF ‍‍‍^{y}	14	–	9	–	1	.604	40	–	17	–	1	.698
Kansas ‍‍‍^{y}	14	–	10	–	0	.583	36	–	21	–	0	.632
No. 19 Arizona State ‍‍‡‍^{y}	11	–	13	–	0	.458	44	–	16	–	0	.733
Utah ‍‍‍	10	–	13	–	1	.438	35	–	20	–	1	.634
Baylor ‍‍‍^{y}	10	–	14	–	0	.417	30	–	28	–	0	.517
Iowa State ‍‍‍	9	–	15	–	0	.375	32	–	23	–	0	.582
BYU ‍‍‍	7	–	17	–	0	.292	18	–	33	–	0	.353
Houston ‍‍‍	3	–	21	–	0	.125	20	–	31	–	0	.392
† – Conference champion ‡ – Tournament champion y – Invited to the NCAA Tournament; As of May 17, 2026; Rankings from NFCA/USA Today

The 2026 Big 12 Conference softball tournament will be held at Devon Park in Oklahoma City, Oklahoma from May 7 to May 9, 2026. The tournament was won by the Arizona State Sun Devils, who earned the Big 12 Conference's automatic bid to the 2026 NCAA Division I softball tournament.

== Format ==
Eight of the top eleven teams were seeded based on conference winning percentage. They then played a single-elimination tournament.

== Seeds ==
The tournament featured all eleven teams in this conference (Cincinnati, Colorado, Kansas State, TCU & West Virginia do not field teams). Teams played once per day at the 2026 Big 12 Softball Championship. The seedings were determined upon completion of regular season play. The winning percentage of the teams in conference play determined tournament seedings. There were tiebreakers in place to seed teams with identical conference records.

Seed	School	Conf.	Over.	Tiebreaker
#1	Texas Tech#	21−3	50−5	―
#2	Oklahoma State	16−8	37−14	2–1 vs Arizona
#3	Arizona	16−8	35−15	1–2 vs Oklahoma State
#4	UCF	14−9–1	38−15–1	―
#5	Kansas	14−10	34−18	―
#6	Arizona State	11−13	38−16	―
#7	Utah	10−13–1	35−19–1	―
#8	Baylor	10−14	28−25	―

Notes: # – Big 12 regular season champions, and tournament No. 1 seed

== Bracket ==
Quarterfinals; May 7
5	Kansas	6
4	UCF	5
8	Baylor	0
1	Texas Tech	7
7	Utah	0
2	Oklahoma State	7
6	Arizona State	2
3	Arizona	1

Semifinals; May 8
5	Kansas	0
1	Texas Tech	14^{(5)}
2	Oklahoma State	7
6	Arizona State	11

Finals; May 9
1	Texas Tech	0
6	Arizona State	4

== Schedule ==
Game	Time*	Matchup^{#}	Score	Television
Quarterfinals – Thursday, May 7
1	11:00 a.m.	No. 4 UCF vs. No. 5 Kansas	5–6	ESPN+
2	1:30 p.m.	No. 1 Texas Tech vs. No. 8 Baylor	7–0	ESPN+
3	5:00 p.m.	No. 2 Oklahoma State vs. No. 7 Utah	7–0	ESPN+
4	7:30 p.m.	No. 3 Arizona vs. No. 6 Arizona State	1–2	ESPN+
Semifinals – Friday, May 8
5	3:00 p.m.	No. 5 Kansas vs. No. 1 Texas Tech	0–14^{(5)}	ESPN+
6	7:00 p.m.	No. 2 Oklahoma State vs. No. 6 Arizona State	7–11	ESPN+
Championship – Saturday, May 9
7	11:00 a.m.	No. 1 Texas Tech vs. No. 6 Arizona State	0–4	ESPN
*Game times in CST. # – Rankings denote tournament seed.

== All-Tournament Team ==
The following players were named to the all-tournament team:

Player	School
**Kenzie Brown**	Arizona State
Emily Schepp	Arizona State
Brooklyn Ulrich	Arizona State
Tanya Windle	Arizona State
Rosie Davis	Oklahoma State
Karli Godwin	Oklahoma State
NiJaree Canady	Texas Tech
Mihyia Davis	Texas Tech
Jackie Lis	Texas Tech
Kaitlyn Terry	Texas Tech
Mia Williams	Texas Tech

MVP in bold
