= 2026 Texas Tech Red Raiders softball team =

College softball season

2026 Texas Tech Red Raiders softball

Big 12 regular season champion NCAA Lubbock Regional champion NCAA Lubbock Super Regional champion

Women's College World Series, runner-up
- Conference: Big 12 Conference
- Record: 61–10 (21–3 Big 12)
- Head coach: Gerry Glasco (2nd season)
- Assistant coaches: Hunter Veach (2nd season); Kayla Kowalik (2nd season)
- Pitching coach: Tara Archibald (2nd season)
- Home stadium: Tracy Sellers Field

2026 Big 12 Conference softball standings
	Conf.						Overall
Team	W		L		T	PCT	W		L		T	PCT
No. 4 Texas Tech ‍†‍‍^{y}	21	–	3	–	0	.875	61	–	10	–	0	.859
No. 15 Oklahoma State ‍‍‍^{y}	16	–	8	–	0	.667	41	–	17	–	0	.707
No. 22 Arizona ‍‍‍^{y}	16	–	8	–	0	.667	37	–	18	–	0	.673
No. 23 UCF ‍‍‍^{y}	14	–	9	–	1	.604	41	–	19	–	1	.680
Kansas ‍‍‍^{y}	14	–	10	–	0	.583	36	–	21	–	0	.632
No. 19 Arizona State ‍‍‡‍^{y}	11	–	13	–	0	.458	45	–	18	–	0	.714
Utah ‍‍‍	10	–	13	–	1	.438	35	–	20	–	1	.634
Baylor ‍‍‍^{y}	10	–	14	–	0	.417	30	–	28	–	0	.517
Iowa State ‍‍‍	9	–	15	–	0	.375	32	–	23	–	0	.582
BYU ‍‍‍	7	–	17	–	0	.292	18	–	33	–	0	.353
Houston ‍‍‍	3	–	21	–	0	.125	20	–	31	–	0	.392
† – Conference champion ‡ – Tournament champion y – Invited to the NCAA Tournament; As of June 4, 2026; Rankings from NFCA/USA Today

The 2026 Texas Tech Red Raiders softball team represented Texas Tech University during the 2026 NCAA Division I softball season as a member of the Big 12 Conference. The Red Raiders were led by second-year head coach Gerry Glasco, and played their home games at the Tracy Sellers Field in Lubbock, Texas.

== Previous season ==
The Red Raiders finished the 2025 season 54–14 overall, and 20–4 in the Big 12, finishing in first place in their conference. The Red Raiders won the Big 12 regular-season title for the first time in program history. In the Big 12 tournament, the Red Raiders outscored opponents 26–0 while going a perfect 3–0 in the tournament, winning the Big 12 tournament for the first time in program history, with pitcher NiJaree Canady being named Most Outstanding Player. In the NCAA tournament, Texas Tech hosted a regional for the first time in program history, winning the Lubbock Regional to advance to the program's first Super Regional. Texas Tech swept Florida State in the Tallahassee Super Regional, 2–0, to advance to the Women's College World Series (WCWS) for the first time in program history.

In the WCWS, the Red Raiders defeated Ole Miss in game 1 and UCLA in game 2 to advance to the semifinals. In the semifinals, Texas Tech faced off against Oklahoma, who won the previous four WCWS titles; the Red Raiders won 3–2 to reach the finals. Texas defeated the Red Raiders in three games during the finals.

== Big 12 preseason poll ==
The Big 12's preseason prediction poll was released on January 28, 2026. The Red Raiders were predicted to finish the regular season first in the conference, with 10 first place votes.

Big 12 preseason poll
Predicted finish	Team	Votes (1st place)
1	Texas Tech	100 (10)
2	Oklahoma State	87 (1)
3	Arizona	77
3	Arizona State	77
5	UCF	63
6	BYU	55
7	Iowa State	44
8	Baylor	42
9	Kansas	28
10	Utah	21
11	Houston	11

== Roster and personnel ==
2026 Texas Tech Red Raiders softball roster
Pitchers: 8 Desirae Spearman (RHP) – Junior; 10 Mallie West (LHP) – Freshman; 22 Samantha Lincoln (LHP) – Sophomore; 24 NiJaree Canady (RHP) – Senior; 55 Kaitlyn Terry (LHP) – Junior; 75 Chloe Riassetto (LHP) – Senior; 77 Timber Hensley (RHP) – Freshman; Catchers: 12 Jasmyn Burns – Junior; 13 Victoria Valdez – Senior; 35 Nikolette Schmidt – Senior; 44 Allyson Dobbs – Freshman; Utility: 00 Jackie Lis – Senior; 4 Lagi Quiroga – Junior; 20 Mia Richards – Freshman	Outfielders: 7 Logan Halleman – Sophomore; 21 Alana Johnson – Junior; 42 Mihyia Davis – Junior; Infielders: 1 Mia Williams – Junior; 2 Cimone Edge – Freshman; 3 Makayla Garcia – Sophomore; 6 Taylor Pannell – (redshirt) Junior; 11 Lauren Allred – (redshirt) Junior; 26 Brianna Hinson – Freshman; 28 Angelyna Conde – Freshman; 32 Hailey Toney – Sophomore

2026 Texas Tech Red Raiders coaching staff
- Gerry Glasco – Head coach
- Tara Archibald – Associate head coach / Pitching coach
- Hunter Veach – Assistant coach
- Kayla Kowalik – Assistant coach

== Schedule and results ==
2026 Texas Tech Red Raiders softball game log
Regular season: 50–5

February: 20–1
Date	Time	Opponent	Rank	Site	Score	Win	Loss	Save	Attendance	Overall Record	Big 12 Record
McNeese Tournament
February 5	6:00 p.m.	at McNeese*	No. 2	Joe Miller Field; Lake Charles, LA	13–3 ^{(5)}	**Canady** (1–0)	Davis (0–1)	—	1,805	1–0	—
February 6	11:00 a.m.	vs. North Texas*	No. 2	Joe Miller Field; Lake Charles, LA	10–2 ^{(5)}	**Lincoln** (1–0)	Lewinski (0–1)	—	—	2–0	—
February 6	1:30 p.m.	vs. Louisiana–Monroe*	No. 2	Joe Miller Field; Lake Charles, LA	13–1 ^{(5)}	**Terry** (1–0)	Lake (0–1)	—	—	3–0	—
February 7	4:30 p.m.	at No. 11 Texas A&M*	No. 2	Davis Diamond; College Station, TX	3–2	**Canady** (2–0)	Munnerlyn (1–1)	—	2,880	4–0	—
February 7	7:00 p.m.	vs. Providence*	No. 2	Davis Diamond; College Station, TX	13–1 ^{(5)}	**Terry** (2–0)	Brooks (0–1)	—	—	5–0	—
February 8	12:00 p.m.	vs. Bryant*	No. 2	Davis Diamond; College Station, TX	12–0 ^{(5)}	**Lincon** (3–1)	Jewitt (0–1)	—	—	6–0	—
Shriners Children's Clearwater Invitational
February 12	12:00 p.m.	vs. No. 7 Florida State*	No. 1	Eddie C. Moore Complex; Clearwater, FL	3–2	**Terry** (3–0)	Danley (2–1)	**Canady** (1)	2,142	7–0	—
February 12	5:00 p.m.	vs. Northwestern*	No. 1	Eddie C. Moore Complex; Clearwater, FL	5–0	**Canady** (3–0)	Blea (1–1)	—	—	8–0	—
February 13	4:00 p.m.	vs. No. 23 Florida Atlantic*	No. 1	Eddie C. Moore Complex; Clearwater, FL	8–0 ^{(5)}	**Canady** (4–0)	Lambert (1–1)	—	—	9–0	—
February 14	12:00 p.m.	vs. NC State*	No. 1	Eddie C. Moore Complex; Clearwater, FL	14–1 ^{(5)}	**Terry** (3–0)	Gore (1–1)	—	—	10–0	—
February 14	3:30 p.m.	vs. James Madison*	No. 1	Eddie C. Moore Complex; Clearwater, FL	5–0	**Lincoln** (3–0)	List (0–2)	—	5,000	11–0	—
February 15	3:00 p.m.	vs. No. 11 Nebraska*	No. 1	Eddie C. Moore Complex; Clearwater, FL	2–3	Jensen (3–1)	**Canady** (4–1)	Frahm (3)	4,908	11–1	—
Mary Nutter Collegiate Classic
February 19	5:30 p.m.	vs. Fresno State*	No. 2	Big League Dreams Sports Park; Cathedral City, CA	12–2 ^{(5)}	**Canady** (5–1)	Carranco (1–3)	—	—	12–1	—
February 20	10:30 1.m.	vs. Bethune–Cookman*	No. 2	Big League Dreams Sports Park; Cathedral City, CA	8–0 ^{(5)}	**Lincoln** (4–0)	Gonzalez (2–5)	—	—	13–1	—
February 21	12:00 p.m.	vs. Cal State Fullerton*	No. 2	Big League Dreams Sports Park; Cathedral City, CA	6–3	**Terry** (5–0)	Hurtado (2–3)	**Canady** (2)	—	14–1	—
February 21	4:30 p.m.	vs. San Diego State*	No. 2	Big League Dreams Sports Park; Cathedral City, CA	5–0	**Canady** (6–1)	Jordan (3–2)	—	—	15–1	—
February 22	9:00 a.m.	vs. UC Riverside*	No. 2	Big League Dreams Sports Park; Cathedral City, CA	16–0 ^{(5)}	**Terry** (5–0)	Barner (0–3)	—	—	16–1	—
Jeannine McHaney Memorial Classic
February 26	5:00 p.m.	Abilene Christian*	No. 2	Tracy Sellers Field; Lubbock, TX	24–0 ^{(5)}	**Canady** (7–1)	Snipes (0–1)	—	1,626	17–1	—
February 27	5:00 p.m.	North Texas*	No. 2	Tracy Sellers Field; Lubbock, TX	10–2 ^{(5)}	**Terry** (7–0)	Anderson (4–3)	—	1,697	18–1	—
February 28	11:30 a.m.	Texas A&M–Corpus Christi*	No. 2	Tracy Sellers Field; Lubbock, TX	18–0 ^{(5)}	**Canady** (8–1)	Whitehead (1–6)	—	1,600	19–1	—
February 28	4:30 p.m.	Detroit Mercy*	No. 2	Tracy Sellers Field; Lubbock, TX	9–0 ^{(5)}	**Terry** (8–0)	Flynn (1–5)	—	1,827	20–1	—

March: 15–1
Date	Time	Opponent	Rank	Site	Score	Win	Loss	Save	Attendance	Overall Record	Big 12 Record
March 1	11:30 a.m.	Texas A&M–Corpus Christi*	No. 2	Tracy Sellers Field; Lubbock, TX	24–1 ^{(5)}	**Spearman** (1–0)	Whitehead (1–7)	—	1,600	21–1	—
March 1	1:30 p.m.	North Texas*	No. 2	Tracy Sellers Field; Lubbock, TX	7–2	**Terry** (9–0)	Lewinski (5–5)	—	1,815	22–1	—
March 6	3:00 p.m.	at Houston	No. 2	Cougar Softball Stadium; Houston, TX	10–0 ^{(5)}	**Canady** (9–1)	Brown (8–3)	—	544	23–1	1–0
March 6	5:30 p.m.	at Houston	No. 2	Cougar Softball Stadium; Houston, TX	11–1 ^{(5)}	**Terry** (10–0)	Park (2–2)	—	1,113	24–1	2–0
March 7	2:00 p.m.	at Houston	No. 2	Cougar Softball Stadium; Houston, TX	12–6	**Terry** (11–0)	Solis (2–1)	—	1,086	25–1	3–0
March 13	6:00 p.m.	No. 13 Arizona	No. 2	Tracy Sellers Field; Lubbock, TX	0–9 ^{(5)}	Adams (12–3)	**Canady** (9–2)	—	1,758	25–2	3–1
March 14	12:00 p.m.	No. 13 Arizona	No. 2	Tracy Sellers Field; Lubbock, TX	14–6 ^{(6)}	**Lincoln** (5–0)	Adams (12–4)	—	—	26–2	4–1
March 14	2:00 p.m.	No. 13 Arizona	No. 2	Tracy Sellers Field; Lubbock, TX	8–0 ^{(5)}	**Canady** (10–2)	Holder (7–2)	—	2,122	27–2	5–1
March 17		at Stetson*	No. 3	Patricia Wilson Field; DeLand, FL	Cancelled						
March 18		at No. 8 Florida State*	No. 3	JoAnne Graf Field; Tallahassee, FL	Cancelled						
March 20	5:00 p.m.	at No. 24 UCF*	No. 3	UCF Softball Complex; Orlando, FL	4–3	**Canady** (11–2)	Vega (8–4)	—	850	28–2	6–1
March 21	4:00 p.m.	at No. 24 UCF*	No. 3	UCF Softball Complex; Orlando, FL	9–0 ^{(6)}	**Terry** (12–0)	Stuewe (5–3)	—	840	29–2	7–1
March 22	11:00 a.m.	at No. 24 UCF	No. 3	UCF Softball Complex; Orlando, FL	7–2	**Lincoln** (6–0)	Stuewe (5–4)	—	751	30–2	8–1
March 24	5:00 p.m.	at Tarleton State*	No. 2	Tarleton Softball Complex; Stephenville, TX	12–0	**Canady** (12–2)	Schultz (7–4)	—	750	31–2	—
March 27	6:00 p.m.	Iowa State	No. 2	Tracy Sellers Field; Lubbock, TX	9–1 ^{(5)}	**Canady** (13–2)	Schurman (11–3)	—	2,000	32–2	9–1
March 28	2:00 p.m.	Iowa State	No. 2	Tracy Sellers Field; Lubbock, TX	10–2 ^{(5)}	**Terry** (13–0)	Ralston (1–4)	—	1,743	33–2	10–1
March 29	12:00 p.m.	Iowa State	No. 2	Tracy Sellers Field; Lubbock, TX	17–6 ^{(5)}	**Lincoln** (7–0)	Schurman (11–4)	—	1,565	34–2	11–1
March 31	5:00 p.m.	at Abilene Christian*	No. 2	Poly Wells Field; Abilene, TX	9–1 ^{(5)}	**Terry** (14–0)	Meyer (2–7)	—	885	35–2	—

April: 14–2
Date	Time	Opponent	Rank	Site	Score	Win	Loss	Save	Attendance	Overall Record	Big 12 Record
April 2	6:00 p.m.	BYU	No. 2	Tracy Sellers Field; Lubbock, TX	11–1 ^{(6)}	**Canady** (14–2)	Mares (5–8)	—	1,310	36–2	12–1
April 3	6:00 p.m.	BYU	No. 2	Tracy Sellers Field; Lubbock, TX	10–1 ^{(5)}	**Terry** (15–0)	Shuler (5–6)	—	1,779	37–2	13–1
April 4	12:00 p.m.	BYU	No. 2	Tracy Sellers Field; Lubbock, TX	12–4 ^{(5)}	**Canady** (15–2)	Villegas (1–9)	—	1,684	38–2	14–1
April 10	6:00 p.m.	at Utah	No. 1	Dumke Family Softball Stadium; Salt Lake City, UT	10–2	**Canady** (16–2)	Jones (10–5)	—	1,271	39–2	15–1
April 11	1:00 p.m.	at Utah	No. 1	Dumke Family Softball Stadium; Salt Lake City, UT	0–4	Maestretti (9–5)	**Terry** (15–1)	—	1,013	39–3	15–2
April 12	12:00 p.m.	at Utah	No. 1	Dumke Family Softball Stadium; Salt Lake City, UT	7–1	**Canady** (17–2)	Jones (10–6)	—	—	40–3	16–2
April 13	3:00 p.m.	at Utah State*	No. 1	LaRee & LeGrand Johnson Field; Logan, UT	17–7 ^{(6)}	**Terry** (16–1)	Limosnero (0–4)	—	619	41–3	—
April 14	6:00 p.m.	at UTSA*	No. 2	Roadrunner Field; San Antonio, TX	10–0 ^{(5)}	**Terry** (17–1)	Hernandez (11–12)	—	576	42–3	—
April 15	6:00 p.m.	at Texas State*	No. 2	Bobcat Softball Stadium; San Marcos, TX	0–3	Azua (20–9)	**Canady** (17–3)	—	—	42–4	—
April 22	5:00 p.m.	at UTEP*	No. 2	Helen of Troy Softball Complex; El Paso, TX	16–0 ^{(5)}	**Terry** (18–1)	Flores (2–9)	—	1,050	43–4	—
April 22	7:00 p.m.	at UTEP*	No. 2	Helen of Troy Softball Complex; El Paso, TX	11–1 ^{(5)}	**Canady** (18–3)	Jones (0–4)	—	1,050	44–4	—
April 24	7:00 p.m.	at No. 24 Arizona State	No. 2	Alberta B. Farrington Softball Stadium; Tempe, AZ	6–0	**Terry** (19–1)	Brown (12–6)	—	2,051	45–4	17–2
April 25	5:00 p.m.	at No. 24 Arizona State	No. 2	Alberta B. Farrington Softball Stadium; Tempe, AZ	7–5	**Canady** (19–3)	Lauppe (10–4)	—	2,035	46–4	18–2
April 26	2:00 p.m.	at No. 24 Arizona State	No. 2	Alberta B. Farrington Softball Stadium; Tempe, AZ	7–1	**Canady** (20–3)	Silva (11–5)	—	2,019	47–4	19–2
April 28	6:00 p.m.	Tarleton State*	No. 2	Tracy Sellers Field; Lubbock, TX	12–2 ^{(5)}	**Terry** (20–1)	Dowell (5–4)	—	1,491	48–4	—
April 30	6:00 p.m.	Baylor	No. 2	Tracy Sellers Field; Lubbock, TX	5–0	**Terry** (21–1)	Tanner (8–8)	—	1,723	49–4	20–2

May: 1–1
Date	Time	Opponent	Rank	Site	Score	Win	Loss	Save	Attendance	Overall Record	Big 12 Record
May 1	6:00 p.m.	Baylor	No. 2	Tracy Sellers Field; Lubbock, TX	7–8	Warncke (4–4)	**Canady** (20–4)	Tanner (3)	1,807	49–5	20–3
May 2	1:30 p.m.	Baylor	No. 2	Tracy Sellers Field; Lubbock, TX	8–0 ^{(5)}	**Canady** (21–4)	Tanner (8–9)	—	2,122	50–5	21–3

Postseason: 11–5

Big 12 Tournament: 2–1
Date	Time	Opponent	Rank	Site	Score	Win	Loss	Save	Attendance	Overall Record	B12T Record
May 7	1:30 p.m.	vs. (8) Baylor	(1) No. 3	Devon Park; Oklahoma City, OK	7–0	**Canady** (22–4)	Tanner (9–10)	—	—	51–5	1–0
May 8	3:00 p.m.	vs. (5) Kansas	(1) No. 3	Devon Park klahoma City, OK	14–0 ^{(5)}	**Terry** (22–1)	Claire (0–1)	—	—	52–5	2–0
May 9	11:00 a.m.	vs. (6) No. 24 Arizona State	(1) No. 3	Devon Park; Oklahoma City, OK	0–4	Brown (15–6)	**Canady** (22–5)	—	2,065	52–6	2–1

Lubbock Regional: 3–0
Date	Time	Opponent	Rank	Site	Score	Win	Loss	Save	Attendance	Overall record	Regional record
May 15	3:30 p.m.	vs. Marist	No. 4	Tracy Sellers Field; Lubbock, TX	10–3	**Terry** (23–1)	Metzger (12–4)	**Lincoln** (1)	2,122	53–6	1–0
May 16	2:00 p.m.	vs. Ole Miss	No. 4	Tracy Sellers Field; Lubbock, TX	10–9 ^{(8)}	**Canady** (23–5)	Aycock (13–10)	—	—	54–6	2–0
May 17	3:00 p.m.	vs. Ole Miss	No. 4	Tracy Sellers Field; Lubbock, TX	14–2 ^{(5)}	**Terry** (24–1)	Boyer (12–14)	—	2,229	55–6	3–0

Gainesville Super Regional: 2–1
Date	Time	Opponent	Rank	Site	Score	Win	Loss	Save	Attendance	Overall record	Super Reg. record
May 22	10:00 a.m.	vs. No. 9 Florida	No. 4	Katie Seashole Pressly Softball Stadium; Gainesville, FL	10–8	**Canady** (24–5)	Oxley (4–2)	—	1,830	56–6	1–0
May 23	11:30 a.m.	vs. No. 9 Florida	No. 4	Katie Seashole Pressly Softball Stadium	2–10	Rothrock (30–6)	**Canady** (24–6)	—	2,225	56–7	1–1
May 24	11:00 a.m.	vs. No. 9 Florida	No. 4	Katie Seashole Pressly Softball Stadium	16–7 ^{(5)}	**Canady** (25–6)	Rothrock (30–7)	—	1,864	57–7	2–1

Women's College World Series: 4–3
Date	Time	Opponent	Rank	Site	Score	Win	Loss	Save	Attendance	Overall record	WCWS record
May 28	11:00 a.m.	vs. Mississippi State	No. 4	Devon Park	8–0 ^{(5)}	**Canady** (26–6)	Faircloth (16–8)	—	—	58–7	1–0
May 30	2:00 p.m.	vs. No. 8 Tennessee	No. 4	Devon Park	1–2 ^{(9)}	Mardjetko (16–2)	**Terry** (24–2)	—	—	58–8	1–1
May 31	6:00 p.m.	vs. No. 5 UCLA	No. 4	Devon Park	8–7 ^{(9)}	**Canady** (27–6)	Tinsley (33–8)	—	12,390	59–8	2–1
June 1	6:00 p.m.	vs. No. 3 Alabama	No. 4	Devon Park	5–4	**Canady** (28–6)	Moten (21–5)	—	—	60–8	3–1
June 1	9:00 p.m.	vs. No. 3 Alabama	No. 4	Devon Park	2–0	**Canady** (29–6)	Briski (25–4)	—	10,041	61–8	4–1
June 3	7:00 p.m.	vs. No. 6 Texas	No. 4	Devon Park	3–7	Kavan (29–6)	**Terry** (24–3)	—	12,149	61–9	4–2
June 4	7:00 p.m.	vs. No. 6 Texas	No. 4	Devon Park	1–4	Gutierrez (11–3)	**Canady** (29–7)	Kavan (5)	12,308	61–10	4–3

- Win
- Loss
- Postponement
- Bold: Red Raiders team member
- Rankings from NFCA.
- (#) Tournament seedings in parentheses.

== Rankings ==
Ranking movements Legend: ██ Increase in ranking ██ Decrease in ranking т = Tied with team above or below
	Week															
Poll	Pre	1	2	3	4	5	6	7	8	9	10	11	12	13	14	Final
NFCA / USA Today	2	1	2	2	2	2	3	2	2	1	2	2	2	3	4	2
Softball America	1	1	2	2	2	3	3	2	2	2	4	4	4	3	3	2
ESPN.com/USA Softball	1т	1	2	2	2	2	3	2	2	1	3	5	4	4	6	2
D1Softball	2	1	3	3	3	3	3	2	2	1	3	3	3	4	4	2
