= 2011 Louisiana–Lafayette Ragin' Cajuns softball team =

Softball team season

2011 Louisiana–Lafayette Ragin' Cajuns softball

Austin Regionals appearance

Sun Belt Conference tournament champions Sun Belt Conference regular-season champions
- Conference: Sun Belt Conference

Ranking
- Coaches: No. 23
- Record: 51-11 (19-5 SBC)
- Head coach: Michael Lotief (11th season); Stefni Lotief (12th season)
- Assistant coach: Chris Malveaux
- Home stadium: Lamson Park

2011 Sun Belt Conference softball standings
	Conf.				Overall
Team	W		L	PCT	W		L	PCT
No. 23 Louisiana-Lafayette ‍†‍‡‍^{y}	19	–	5	.792	51	–	11	.823
Florida Atlantic ‍‍‍	15	–	9	.625	34	–	25	.576
South Alabama ‍‍‍	14	–	10	.583	37	–	17	.685
FIU ‍‍‍	14	–	10	.583	31	–	27	.534
Troy ‍‍‍	11	–	12	.478	32	–	27	.542
Louisiana-Monroe ‍‍‍	10	–	14	.417	27	–	28	.491
Western Kentucky ‍‍‍	9	–	15	.375	30	–	29	.508
Middle Tennessee ‍‍‍	8	–	16	.333	18	–	33	.353
North Texas ‍‍‍	7	–	16	.304	22	–	30	.423
† – Conference champion ‡ – Tournament champion y – Invited to the NCAA tournament As of July 4, 2019; Rankings from

The 2011 Louisiana–Lafayette Ragin' Cajuns softball team represented the University of Louisiana at Lafayette in the 2011 NCAA Division I softball season. The Ragin' Cajuns played their home games at Lamson Park and were led by eleventh and twelfth year husband and wife head coach duo Michael and Stenfi Lotief, respectively.

== Preseason ==
=== Sun Belt Conference Coaches Poll ===
The Sun Belt Conference Coaches Poll was released on February 7, 2011. Louisiana-Lafayette was picked to finish first in the Sun Belt Conference with 80 votes and 8 first place votes

Coaches poll
Predicted finish	Team	Votes (1st place)
1	Louisiana-Lafayette	80 (8)
2	FIU	69 (1)
3	Troy	55
4	North Texas	54
5	Florida Atlantic	53
5	South Alabama	33
7	Louisiana-Monroe	25
8	Western Kentucky	20
9	Middle Tennessee	16

=== Preseason All-Sun Belt team ===
- Ashley Brignac (ULL, JR, Pitcher)
- Ashlyn Williams (TROY, SR, Pitcher)
- Kerri Croney (FAU, SR, Catcher)
- Gabriele Bridges (ULL, SR, 1st Base)
- Brie Rojas (FIU, SO, 2nd Base)
- Nerissa Myers (ULL, SO, Shortstop)
- Jessy Alfonso (FIU, SO, 3rd Base)
- Ashley McClain (FIU, JR, Outfield)
- Christi Orgeron (ULL, JR, Outfield)
- Brianna Love (ULM, SR, Outfield)
- Mallorie Sulaski (WKU, SO, Designated Player)

== Roster ==
2011 Louisiana-Lafayette Ragin' Cajuns roster
Pitchers: 00 Ashley Brignac - Junior; 4 Shelbee Rodgers - Redshirt Freshman; 16 Christina Hamilton - Redshirt Freshman; 19 Lacy Blanchard - Redshirt Freshman; 21 Donna Bourgeois - Senior; 28 Paige Cavallin - Sophomore; 32 Allie Chenault - Redshirt Freshman; Utility Players: 8 Megan Waterman - Sophomore; 10 Tori Cummings - Redshirt Freshman; 12 Christi Orgeron - Junior; 17 Callie Philen - Sophomore; Catchers: 24 Sarah Draheim - Sophomore	Infielders: 6 Taylor Meaux - Freshman; 10 Peyton Webb - Freshman; 15 Nerissa Myers - Junior; 27 Matte Haack - Junior; 29 Megan Granger - Senior; 31 Paige Cormier - Senior; Outfielders: 3 Natalie Fernandez - Redshirt Freshman; 6 Courtney Hollier - Junior; 9 Taryn Broussard - Sophomore; 15 Nerissa Myers - Sophomore; 22 Jennifer Martin - Sophomore; 25 Gabriele Bridges - Senior; 29 Megan Granger - Junior; 31 Paige Cormier - Junior

=== Coaching staff ===
2011 Louisiana-Lafayette Ragin' Cajuns coaching staff
- Michael Lotief – Co-Head Coach – 11th year
- Stefni Lotief - Co-Head Coach - 12th year
- Chris Malveaux - Assistant coach - 3rd year

== Schedule and results ==
Legend
	Louisiana-Lafayette win
	Louisiana-Lafayette loss
	Postponement
**Bold**	Louisiana-Lafayette team member

2011 Louisiana–Lafayette Ragin' Cajuns Softball Game Log
Regular season (45–9)

February (12–1)
Date	Opponent	Ranking	Site/stadium	Score	TV	Overall record	SBC record
Louisiana Classics
Feb. 11	vs. Rhode Island	No. 17	Lamson Park • Lafayette, LA	**W** 14-0		1-0	
Feb. 11	vs. Rhode Island	No. 17	Lamson Park • Lafayette, LA	**W** 20-0		2-0	
Feb. 12	vs. Arkansas	No. 17	Lamson Park • Lafayette, LA	**W** 14-1		3-0	
Feb. 12	vs. Prairie View A&M	No. 17	Lamson Park • Lafayette, LA	**W** 28-0		4-0	
Feb. 13	vs. Sam Houston State	No. 17	Lamson Park • Lafayette, LA	**W** 4-1		5-0	
Ragin' Cajuns Invitational
Feb. 18	vs. Maine	No. 16	Lamson Park • Lafayette, LA	**W** 11-0		6–0	
Feb. 18	vs. Tennessee State	No. 16	Lamson Park • Lafayette, LA	**W** 19-0		7-0	
Feb. 19	vs. Maine	No. 16	Lamson Park • Lafayette, LA	**W** 9-0		8-0	
Feb. 19	vs. Stephen F. Austin	No. 16	Lamson Park • Lafayette, LA	**W** 7-0		8-0	
Feb. 20	vs. Tennessee State	No. 16	Lamson Park • Lafayette, LA	**W** 9-1		9-0	
Cowgirl Classic
Feb. 25	vs. Southern	No. 15	Joe Miller Field at Cowgirl Diamond • Lake Charles, LA	**L** 4-5		8-1	
Feb. 25	vs. Jackson State	No. 15	Joe Miller Field at Cowgirl Diamond • Lake Charles, LA	**W** 12-2		9-1	
Feb. 26	vs. Grambling State	No. 15	Joe Miller Field at Cowgirl Diamond • Lake Charles, LA	**W** 7-0		10-1	
Feb. 26	vs. McNeese State	No. 15	Joe Miller Field at Cowgirl Diamond • Lake Charles, LA	**W** 4-0		11-1	
Feb. 27	vs. Houston Baptist	No. 15	Joe Miller Field at Cowgirl Diamond • Lake Charles, LA	**W** 5-0		12-1	

March (13–4)
Date	Opponent	Ranking	Site/stadium	Score	TV	Overall record	SBC record
Citrus Classic
Mar. 4	vs. Virginia	No. 17	ESPN Wide World of Sports Complex • Bay Lake, FL	**W** 9-1		13-1	
Mar. 4	vs. Alabama	No. 17	ESPN Wide World of Sports Complex • Bay Lake, FL	**W** 1-0		14-1	
Mar. 5	vs. Oregon	No. 17	ESPN Wide World of Sports Complex • Bay Lake, FL	**L** 2-5		14-2	
Mar. 5	vs. Temple	No. 17	ESPN Wide World of Sports Complex • Bay Lake, FL	**W** 18-3		15-2	
Mar. 6	vs. LIU Brooklyn	No. 17	ESPN Wide World of Sports Complex • Bay Lake, FL	**W** 4-0		16-2	
Mar. 12	at North Texas	No. 17	Lovelace Softball Stadium • Denton, TX	**W** 5-2		17-2	1–0
Mar. 12	at North Texas	No. 17	Lovelace Softball Stadium • Denton, TX	**W** 7-3		18-2	2–0
Mar. 13	at North Texas	No. 17	Lovelace Softball Stadium • Denton, TX	**L** 5-8		18-3	2–1
Mar. 15	McNeese State	No. 17	Lamson Park • Lafayette, LA	**W** 9-4		19-3	
Judi Garman Classic
Mar. 17	vs. Notre Dame	No. 19	Anderson Family Field • Fullerton, CA	**W** 5-1		20-3	
Mar. 17	vs. Arizona	No. 19	Anderson Family Field • Fullerton, CA	**L** 2-10		20-4	
Mar. 15	vs. Arizona State	No. 19	Anderson Family Field • Fullerton, CA	**L** 4-10		20-5	
Mar. 19	vs. New Mexico	No. 19	Anderson Family Field • Fullerton, CA	**W** 8-4		21-5	
Mar. 19	vs. Long Beach State	No. 19	Anderson Family Field • Fullerton, CA	**W** 9-5		22-5	
Mar. 26	Troy	No. 19	Lamson Park • Lafayette, LA	**W** 5-2		23-5	3–1
Mar. 26	Troy	No. 19	Lamson Park • Lafayette, LA	**W** 8-0		24-5	4–1
Mar. 27	Troy	No. 19	Lamson Park • Lafayette, LA	**W** 9-1		25-5	5–1

April (15–4)
Date	Opponent	Ranking	Site/stadium	Score	TV	Overall record	SBC record
Apr. 6	FIU	No. 19	Lamson Park • Lafayette, LA	**W** 7-2		26-5	6–1
Apr. 6	FIU	No. 19	Lamson Park • Lafayette, LA	**L** 2-3		26-6	6–2
Apr. 7	FIU	No. 19	Lamson Park • Lafayette, LA	**W** 2-1		27-6	7–2
Apr. 9	at South Alabama	No. 19	Jaguar Field • Mobile, AL	**W** 5-1		28-6	8–2
Apr. 9	at South Alabama	No. 19	Jaguar Field • Mobile, AL	**W** 13-2		29-6	9–2
Apr. 10	at South Alabama	No. 19	Jaguar Field • Mobile, AL	**W** 10-2		30-6	10–2
Apr. 13	Centenary	No. 18	Lamson Park • Lafayette, LA	**W** 7-0		31-6	
Apr. 16	Middle Tennessee	No. 18	Lamson Park • Lafayette, LA	**W** 11-0		32-6	11–2
Apr. 16	Middle Tennessee	No. 18	Lamson Park • Lafayette, LA	**W** 9-1		33-6	12–2
Apr. 17	Middle Tennessee	No. 18	Lamson Park • Lafayette, LA	**W** 8-0		34-6	13–2
Apr. 19	Nicholls State	No. 17	Lamson Park • Lafayette, LA	**W** 8-0		35-6	
Apr. 19	Nicholls State	No. 17	Lamson Park • Lafayette, LA	**W** 11-2		36-6	
Apr. 23	at Florida Atlantic	No. 17	FAU Softball Stadium • Boca Raton, FL	**L** 0-1		36-7	13–3
Apr. 23	at Florida Atlantic	No. 17	FAU Softball Stadium • Boca Raton, FL	**L** 2-4		36-8	13–4
Apr. 24	at Florida Atlantic	No. 17	FAU Softball Stadium • Boca Raton, FL	**L** 2-6		36-9	13–5
Apr. 27	Northwestern State	No. 23	Lamson Park • Lafayette, LA	**W** 10-0		37-9	
Apr. 30	Western Kentucky	No. 23	Lamson Park • Lafayette, LA	**W** 3-2		38-9	14–5
Apr. 30	Western Kentucky	No. 23	Lamson Park • Lafayette, LA	**W** 10-2		39-9	15–5

May (4–0)
Date	Opponent	Ranking	Site/stadium	Score	TV	Overall record	SBC record
May 1	Western Kentucky	No. 23	Lamson Park • Lafayette, LA	**W** 10-0		40-9	16–5
May 7	at Louisiana-Monroe	No. 23	Geo-Surfaces Field at the ULM Softball Complex • Monroe, LA	**W** 3-0		41-9	17–5
May 7	at Louisiana-Monroe	No. 23	Geo-Surfaces Field at the ULM Softball Complex • Monroe, LA	**W** 12-3		42-9	18–5
May 8	at Louisiana-Monroe	No. 23	Geo-Surfaces Field at the ULM Softball Complex • Monroe, LA	**W** 5-0		43-9	19–5

Post-Season (6–2)

SBC tournament (4–0)
Date	Opponent	Ranking	Site/stadium	Score	TV	Overall record	SBC record
May 11	vs. Middle Tennessee (first round)	No. 25	Lamson Park • Lafayette, LA	**W** 10-3		44-9	
May 12	vs. Troy (quarterfinals)	No. 25	Lamson Park • Lafayette, LA	**W** 7-3		45-9	
May 13	vs. South Alabama (semifinals)	No. 25	Lamson Park • Lafayette, LA	**W** 10-0		46-9	
May 14	vs. Florida Atlantic (championship)	No. 25	Lamson Park • Lafayette, LA	**W** 8-0		47-9	

NCAA tournament (2-2)
Date	Opponent	Ranking	Site/stadium	Score	TV	Overall record	SBC record
Austin Regionals
May 20	vs. Houston	No. 25	Red and Charline McCombs Field • Austin, TX	**L** 2-7		49-10	
May 21	vs. Texas State	No. 25	Red and Charline McCombs Field • Austin, TX	**W** 11-2		50-10	
May 21	vs. Texas	No. 25	Red and Charline McCombs Field • Austin, TX	**W** 5-3		51-10	
May 22	vs. Houston	No. 25	Red and Charline McCombs Field • Austin, TX	**L** 1-4		51-11	

Schedule source:

== Austin Regional ==
Austin Regional Teams
(1) Texas Longhorns	(2) Houston Cougars	(3) Louisiana–Lafayette Ragin' Cajuns	(4) Texas State Bobcats

First Round
3	Texas	2
Texas State	0
Houston	7
Louisiana–Lafayette	2
Lower round 1
Texas State	2
Louisiana–Lafayette	11

Semi-finals
3	Texas	0
Houston	1
Lower final
Louisiana–Lafayette	5
3	Texas	3

Finals
Houston	4	–
Louisiana–Lafayette	1	–
