= 2011 NCAA Division I softball tournament =

- Teams: 64
- Finals site: ASA Hall of Fame Stadium; Oklahoma City
- Champions: Arizona State (2nd NCAA (4th overall) title)
- Runner-up: Florida (4th WCWS Appearance)
- Winning coach: Clint Myers (2nd title)
- MOP: Dallas Escobedo and Michelle Moultrie (Arizona State and Florida)

The 2011 NCAA Division I softball tournament was held from May 19 through June 8, 2011 as part of the 2011 NCAA Division I softball season. The 64 NCAA Division I college softball teams were selected out of an eligible 284 teams on May 15, 2011. 30 teams were awarded an automatic bid as champions of their conference, and 34 teams were selected at-large by the NCAA Division I Softball Selection Committee. The tournament culminated with eight teams playing in the 2011 Women's College World Series at ASA Hall of Fame Stadium in Oklahoma City, Oklahoma.

== Automatic bids ==
Conference	School
ACC	Florida State
America East	Albany
Atlantic 10	Fordham
Atlantic Sun	Jacksonville
Big 10	Michigan
Big 12	Missouri
Big East	Syracuse
Big South	Liberty
Big West	Pacific
Colonial	Georgia State
Conference USA	East Carolina
Horizon	UIC
Ivy	Harvard
Mid-American	Western Michigan
Metro Atlantic	Iona
Mid-Eastern	Bethune–Cookman
Missouri Valley	Missouri State
Mountain West	BYU
Northeast	Sacred Heart
Ohio Valley	Jacksonville State
Pac-10	Arizona State
Pacific Coast	Portland State
Patriot	Lehigh
SEC	Tennessee
Southern	Chattanooga
Southland	Texas State
SWAC	Jackson State
Summit	North Dakota State
Sun Belt	Louisiana–Lafayette
WAC	New Mexico State

== National seeds ==
Teams in "italics" advanced to super regionals. Teams in "bold" advanced to Women's College World Series.

1. Arizona State
2. Alabama
3. Texas
4. Florida
5. Missouri
6. Georgia
7. California
8. Arizona
9. Oklahoma
10. Michigan
11. Baylor
12. Washington
13. Oregon
14. Tennessee
15. Stanford
16. Texas A&M

== Regionals and super regionals ==
=== Tempe Super Regional ===
First round	Round 2
1	Arizona State	10
North Dakota State	0
1	Arizona State	8
Long Beach State	0
San Diego State	2
Long Beach State	6
Tempe Regional
North Dakota State	4
San Diego State	5
Long Beach State	4
San Diego State	6
16	Texas A&M	10
Sacred Heart	2
16	Texas A&M	13
Syracuse	5
LSU	0
Syracuse	3
College Station Regional
Sacred Heart	0
LSU	10
Syracuse	0
LSU	5

Regional finals
1	Arizona State	6	—
San Diego State	1	—
16	Texas A&M	3	—
LSU	1	—

Super regionals
1	Arizona State	3	4	—
16	Texas A&M	2	2	—

=== Tucson Super Regional ===
First round	Round 2
8	Arizona	10
Harvard	0
8	Arizona	8
New Mexico State	0
Texas Tech	0
New Mexico State	9
Tucson Regional
Harvard	0
Texas Tech	7
New Mexico State	4
Texas Tech	6
9	Oklahoma	7
Iona	1
9	Oklahoma	6
Tulsa	0
Missouri State	7
Tulsa	9
Norman Regional
Iona	2
Missouri State	4
Tulsa	11
Missouri State	0

Regional finals
8	Arizona	10	—
Texas Tech	2	—
9	Oklahoma	3	5
Tulsa	4	0

Super regionals
8	Arizona	0	2	—
9	Oklahoma	6	5	—

=== Columbia Super Regional ===
Round 1	Round 2
5	Missouri	12
Illinois State	3
5	Missouri	1
DePaul	2
DePaul	2
Indiana	1
Columbia Regional
Illinois State	3
Indiana	1
5	Missouri	8
Illinois State	4
12	Washington	6
Portland State	2
12	Washington	4
BYU	1
Auburn	1
BYU	2
Seattle Regional
Portland State	1
Auburn	2
Auburn	3
BYU	4

Regional finals
DePaul	3	0
5	Missouri	7	8
12	Washington	7	—
BYU	5	—

Super regionals
5	Missouri	4	6	—
12	Washington	0	3	—

=== Gainesville Super Regional ===
Round 1	Round 2
4	Florida	8
Bethune–Cookman	0
4	Florida	4
UCLA	2
UCLA	2
Jacksonville	0
Gainesville Regional
Bethune–Cookman	0
Jacksonville	8
UCLA	12
Jacksonville	4
13	Oregon	3
Albany	1
13	Oregon	2
Fordham	0
Fordham	2
Penn State	0
University Park Regional
Albany	1
Penn State	6
Fordham	2
Penn State	5

Regional finals
4	Florida	2	11
UCLA	3	3
13	Oregon	3	—
Penn State	1	—

Super regionals
4	Florida	9	7	—
13	Oregon	1	0	—

=== Stillwater Super Regional ===
Round 1	Round 2
3	Texas	2
Texas State	0
3	Texas	0
Houston	1
Houston	7
Louisiana–Lafayette	2
Austin Regional
Texas State	2
Louisiana–Lafayette	11
Louisiana–Lafayette	5
3	Texas	3
14	Tennessee	8
Liberty	0
14	Tennessee	1
Oklahoma State	6
Oklahoma State	2
Georgia Tech	1
Knoxville Regional
Liberty	3
Georgia Tech	4
Georgia Tech	0
14	Tennessee	7

Regional finals
Houston	4	—
Louisiana–Lafayette	1	—
Oklahoma State	6	—
14	Tennessee	5	—

Super regionals
Houston	0	1	5
Oklahoma State	3	0	6

=== Athens Super Regional ===
Round 1	Round 2
6	Georgia	8
Georgia State	0
6	Georgia	9
UAB	2
Florida State	0
UAB	2
Athens Regional
Georgia State	1
Florida State	6
UAB	1
Florida State	13
11	Baylor	4
Lehigh	0
11	Baylor	2
East Carolina	0
East Carolina	5
Maryland	2
College Park Regional
Lehigh	0
Maryland	11
East Carolina	2
Maryland	0

Regional finals
6	Georgia	10	—
Florida State	2	—
11	Baylor	1	—
East Carolina	0	—

Super regionals
6	Georgia	1	14	2
11	Baylor	5	2	9

=== Berkeley Super Regional ===
Round 1	Round 2
7	California	6
Jacksonville State	3
7	California	4
Louisville	0
UIC	2
Louisville	5
Louisville Regional
Jacksonville State	1
UIC	0
Louisville	12
Jacksonville State	0
10	Michigan	5
Western Michigan	0
10	Michigan	6
Kentucky	7
Notre Dame	0
Kentucky	8
Ann Arbor Regional
Western Michigan	0
Notre Dame	4
10	Michigan	9
Notre Dame	8

Regional finals
7	California	3	—
Louisville	0	—
Kentucky	2	—
10	Michigan	1	—

Super regionals
7	California	1	0	9
Kentucky	0	8	0

=== Tuscaloosa Super Regional ===
Round 1	Round 2
2	Alabama	8
Jackson State	0
2	Alabama	7
Memphis	1
Chattanooga	1
Memphis	4
Tuscaloosa Regional
Jackson State	1
Chattanooga	8
Memphis	1
Chattanooga	2
15	Stanford	3
Pacific	0
15	Stanford	3
Fresno State	1
Fresno State	1
Nebraska	0
Stanford Regional
Pacific	1
Nebraska	11
Fresno State	0
Nebraska	5

Regional finals
2	Alabama	11	—
Chattanooga	1	—
15	Stanford	4	—
Nebraska	1	—

Super regionals
2	Alabama	2	10	1
15	Stanford	5	0	0

== Women's College World Series ==
=== Participants ===
School	Conference	Record (conference)	Head coach	WCWS appearances† (including 2011 WCWS)	WCWS best finish†	WCWS W–L record† (excluding 2011 WCWS)
Alabama	Southeastern	51–9 (19–6)	Patrick Murphy	7 (last: 2009)	3rd (2008, 2009)	6–12
Arizona State	Pacific-10	55–6 (17–4)	Clint Myers	9 (last: 2009)	1st (2008)	11–14
Baylor	Big 12	45–13 (11–7)	Glenn Moore	2 (last: 2007)	5th (2007)	1–2
California	Pacific-10	44–11 (15–6)	Diane Ninemire	11 (last: 2005)	1st (2002)	18–17
Florida	Southeastern	52–10 (21–7)	Tim Walton	4 (last: 2010)	2nd (2009)	7–6
Missouri	Big 12	51–8 (15–3)	Ehren Earleywine	6 (last: 2010)	5th (1991)	1–10
Oklahoma	Big 12	43–17 (10–8)	Patty Gasso	6 (last: 2004)	1st (2000)	7–8
Oklahoma State	Big 12	42–17 (8–10)	Rich Wieligman	7 (last: 1998)	3rd (1989, 1990, 1993, 1994)	11–12

† Excludes results of the pre-NCAA Women's College World Series of 1969 through 1981.

==== Notes ====
- Oklahoma and Oklahoma State both advanced to the Women's College World Series, held in Oklahoma, for the first time ever.

=== Bracket and results ===
==== Bracket ====
All times are Central Time Zone

First round
1	Arizona State	3
9	Oklahoma	1
4	Florida	6
5	Missouri	2
9	Oklahoma	1
5	Missouri	4
11	Baylor	1
Oklahoma State	0
2	Alabama	1
7	California	0
Oklahoma State	2
7	California	6

Second round
1	Arizona State	6
4	Florida	5
11	Baylor	1
5	Missouri	0
11	Baylor	0
2	Alabama	3
4	Florida	5
7	California	2

Semifinals
1	Arizona State	4	—
11	Baylor	0	—
2	Alabama	2	2
4	Florida	16	9

Finals
1	Arizona State	14	7	—
4	Florida	4	2	—

==== Game results ====
Date	Game	Winner	Score	Loser	Attendance	Notes
June 2, 2011	Game 1	Alabama	1 – 0	California	7,280	Alabama's first WCWS opening round win; Kelsi Dunne struck out 11 Bear batters
June 2, 2011	Game 2	Baylor	1 – 0 (8 inn)	Oklahoma State	7,280	Kelsi Kettler hit a walk-off HR for Baylor; Whitney Canion struck out ten Cowgirl batters
June 2, 2011	Game 3	Arizona State	3 – 1	Oklahoma	8,152	Katelyn Boyd hit a HR for Arizona State
June 2, 2011	Game 4	Florida	6 – 2	Missouri	8,152	Michelle Moultrie and Megan Bush hit HRs for Florida
June 3, 2011	Game 5	Alabama	3 – 0	Baylor	8,672	Alabama has held opponents scoreless for 30 1/3 straight innings
June 3, 2011	Game 6	Arizona State	6 – 5	Florida	8,672	Mandy Urfer and Annie Lockwood hit HRs for Arizona State; Tiffany Defelice and Moultrie hit HRs for Florida; Lockwood hit walk-off bases loaded infield single; Dallas Escobedo struck out 12 Gator batters
June 4, 2011	Game 7	California	6 – 2	Oklahoma State	8,161	Elia Reid hit HR and Ashley Decker hit 3-RBI triple for California
June 4, 2011	Game 8	Missouri	4 – 1	Oklahoma	8,161	Catherine Lee and Nicole Hudson had two hits each for Mizzou; Three of Missouri's four runs were unearned Dani Dobbs hit 7th-inning HR for Oklahoma's lone run
June 4, 2011	Game 9	Florida	5 – 2	California	8,477	Aja Paculba singled to score Megan Bush in the third inning to collect the game-winning RBI
June 4, 2011	Game 10	Baylor	1 – 0 (13 inn)	Missouri	8,477	Holly Holl hit a walk-off HR for Baylor; Chelsea Thomas struck out 19 Bears batters, second most in WCWS history; pitchers combined to throw 367 total pitches
June 5, 2011	Game 11	Florida	16 – 2 (5 inn)	Alabama		Jazlyn Lunceford and Whitney Larsen hit a HR for Alabama; Ensley; Gammel, Cheyenne Coyle, and Moultrie hit HRs, and Brittany Schutte hit GS for Florida; Florida scored inning-record 11 runs in first; Florida collected single-game record 15 RBI
June 5, 2011	Game 12	Arizona State	4 – 0	Baylor		Urfer hit a HR for Arizona State
June 5, 2011	Game 13	Florida	9 – 2	Alabama		Kelsey Bruder, Paculba, and Schutte hit HRs for Florida
June 6, 2011	Finals game 1	Arizona State	14 – 4	Florida		Sam Parlich and Lockwood hit HRs and Krista Donnenwirth hit 2 HRs for Arizona State; Bruder, Coyle, and Moultrie hit HRs for Florida; first Series; Championship game with two freshmen starting pitchers (Dallas Escobedo v. Hannah Rogers)
June 7, 2011	Finals game 2	Arizona State	7 – 2	Florida		Lockwood hit a HR for Arizona State

==== Championship game ====
School	Top Batter	Stats.
Arizona State Sun Devils	Katelyn Boyd (SS)	2-4 3RBIs
Florida Gators	Tiffany DeFelice (C)	2-3 RBI

School	Pitcher	IP	H	R	ER	BB	SO	AB	BF
Arizona State Sun Devils	Dallas Escobedo (W)	7.0	4	2	2	5	5	23	30
Florida Gators	Stephanie Brombacher (L)	3.0	6	5	5	2	2	16	19
Florida Gators	Hannah Rogers	4.0	3	2	2	3	1	13	17

==== Final standings ====
Place	School	WCWS record
1st	Arizona State	5-0
2nd	Florida	4-3
3rd	Alabama	2-2
3rd	Baylor	2-2
5th	Missouri	1-2
5th	California	1-2
7th	Oklahoma	0-2
7th	Oklahoma State	0-2

=== All-Tournament Team ===
- Whitney Larsen, Alabama
- Holly Holl, Baylor
- Whitney Canion, Baylor
- Chelsea Thomas, Missouri
- Cheyenne Coyle, Florida
- Kelsey Bruder, Florida
- Brittany Schutte, Florida
- Krista Donnenwirth, Arizona State
- Annie Lockwood, Arizona State
- Mandy Urfer, Arizona State

=== WCWS records ===
- Runs, game (team), 16 - tied with UCLA (3 June 2010)

In Game 11, Florida scored 16 runs against Alabama

- Runs, inning (team), 11 - new record, surpassing former record of 9 (UCLA, May 24, 1992)

In Game 11, Florida scored 11 runs in the first inning of a 16-2 victory over Alabama

- Runs, Series (team), 45 - new record, surpassing former record of 31 (UCLA in 1992)

In Game 11, Florida scored its 32nd run of the Series in a 16-2 victory over Alabama

- RBI, game (team), 15 - new record, surpassing former record of 11 (Arizona, May 25, 1989; Arizona State, 3 June 2008)

In Game 11, Florida batted in 15 runs in 16-2 victory over Alabama

- Margin of victory, 14 runs - tied with Alabama (30 May 2009)

In Game 11, Florida defeated Alabama 16-2

- Home runs, game (team), 4 - tied with Georgia (30 May 2009) and UCLA (8 June 2010)

In Game 11, Michelle Moultrie, Brittany Schutte, Ensley Gammel, and Cheyenne Coyle hit home runs for the Florida Gators
In Game 14, Sam Parlich and Annie Lockwood hit home runs and Krista Donnenwirth hit two home runs for the Arizona State Sun Devils

- Runs, Series (individual), 10 - new record, surpassing former record of 8 (Caitlin Lowe in 2006)

In Game 13, Kelsey Bruder scored her 7th, 8th, and 9th runs of the Series in Florida's 9-2 victory over Alabama

- Home runs, game (individual), 2 - tied with Gutierrez (UCLA, 1992), Collins (Arizona, 1999), Enea (Florida, 2008), Harrison (UCLA, 2010), Schutte (Florida, 2010), Langenfeld (UCLA, 2010), & Chambers (Arizona, 2010)

In Game 14, Krista Donnenwirth hit two home runs in Arizona State's 14-4 win over Florida

- Home runs, Series (individual), 4 - tied with Megan Langenfeld, Andrea Harrison, and Stacie Chambers (2010)

Michelle Moultrie hit home runs in Game 4, Game 6, Game 11, and Game 14

- Home runs, Series (team), 14 by Florida - tied with UCLA (2010)

In Game 14, Michelle Moultrie hit Florida's 14th home run of the Series

- Home runs (total), 7 - tied with UCLA & Arizona (8 June 2010)

In Game 14, Arizona State hit four home runs and Florida hit three

- Total bases, game (individual), 8 - tied

In Game 14, Krista Donnenwirth went 2-for-4 with two home runs

- Total bases, game (team), 26 - new record, surpassing former record of 20 (UCLA, May 24, 1992; Arizona, May 26, 1996; Northwestern, 1 June 2006)

In Game 14, Arizona State collected eight singles, a double, and four home runs

- Total bases, game (both teams), 41 - new record

In Game 14, Florida collected one single, one double, and three home runs in addition to Arizona State's 26 total bases

- Hits, Series (individual), 13 - tied

In Game 15, Michelle Moultrie collected her 13th hit with a leadoff double

- Total bases, Series (individual), 26 - new record

In Game 15, Michelle Moultrie collected her 25th and 26th bases with a leadoff double

- Fewest errors, Tournament (team), 0 - tied with UCLA (1988 and 1982)

The Arizona State Sun Devils completed the Tournament without making an error in the field

Note: The above records exclude those of the pre-NCAA Women's College World Series of 1969 through 1981.

=== Post-series notes ===
Dallas Escobedo and Michelle Moultrie won co-MVP honors. Moultrie batted .542, going 13-for-24 with four home runs and seven RBI; Escobedo pitched 35 innings, surrendering 12 earned runs on 27 hits and 19 walks while striking out 38 to become the fourth freshman to win the WCWS in the NCAA era and the first since 1990.
