= Nicole Hudson =

American softball player

Personal information
- Nationality: American
- Born: November 11, 1990 (age 35) Webb City, Missouri
- Height: 5 ft 7 in (1.70 m)

Sport
- Country: USA
- Sport: Softball
- College team: Missouri Tigers

Nicole Hudson (born November 11, 1990) is an American softball player. She grew up in Webb City, Missouri, where her father owned a pizzeria, and attended Webb City High School, where she played softball and basketball. She later attended the University of Missouri, where she played third base and pitcher on the Missouri Tigers softball team. During her freshman season in 2010, Hudson led the Tigers to the 2010 Women's College World Series first round, where they fell to Florida, 5–0. During her sophomore season in 2011, Hudson led the Tigers to the 2011 Women's College World Series second round, where they fell to Baylor, 1–0.
