= 2011 Florida Gators softball team =

American college softball season

2011 Florida Gators softball

Gainesville Super Regional champion Gainesville Regional champion SEC East Division champion

Women's College World Series, runner-up
- Conference: Southeastern Conference
- East
- Record: 56–13 (21-7 SEC)
- Head coach: Tim Walton (6th season)
- Home stadium: Katie Seashole Pressly Softball Stadium

2011 Southeastern Conference softball standings
	Conf.				Overall
Team	W		L	PCT	W		L	PCT
Eastern
No. 2 Florida ^{x}‍‍‍^{y}	21	–	7	.750	56	–	13	.812
No. 18 Tennessee ‍‍‡‍^{y}	20	–	8	.714	49	–	12	.803
No. 9 Georgia ‍‍‍^{y}	17	–	9	.654	51	–	14	.785
No. 13 Kentucky ‍‍‍^{y}	14	–	9	.609	40	–	16	.714
South Carolina ‍‍‍	6	–	22	.214	26	–	30	.464
Western
No. 3 Alabama ^{x}‍‍‍^{y}	19	–	6	.760	53	–	11	.828
No. 22 LSU ‍‍‍^{y}	19	–	9	.679	40	–	18	.690
Auburn ‍‍‍^{y}	15	–	13	.536	40	–	19	.678
Mississippi State ‍‍‍	10	–	18	.357	24	–	32	.429
Ole Miss ‍‍‍	3	–	23	.115	14	–	39	.264
Arkansas ‍‍‍	3	–	23	.115	13	–	39	.250
x – Division champion ‡ – Tournament champion y – Invited to the NCAA Tournament; As of June 30, 2011; Rankings from NFCA/USA Today

The 2011 Florida Gators softball team represented the University of Florida in the 2011 NCAA Division I softball season. The Gators were coached by Tim Walton, who led his sixth season. The Gators finished with a record of 56–13.

The Gators were invited to the 2011 NCAA Division I Softball Tournament, where they won the Gainesville Regional and Super Regional and then completed a run to the title game of the Women's College World Series, their fourth overall and consecutive appearance in Oklahoma City, where they fell to champion Arizona State.

== Personnel ==
=== Roster ===
The 2011 Florida Gators softball team has 5 seniors, 4 juniors, 4 sophomores, and 4 freshmen.

2011 Florida Gators roster
Pitchers: 11 - Ensley Gammel - Sophomore; 13 - Hannah Rogers - Freshman; 32 - Stephanie Brombacher - Senior; Catchers: 20 - Kelsey Horton - Sophomore; 28 - Tiffany DeFelice - Senior	Infielders: 3 - Aja Paculba - Senior; 7 - Lauren Heil - Junior; 15 - Samantha Holle - Sophomore; 27 - Cheyenne Coyle - Freshman; Outfielders: 2 - Kelsey Bruder - Senior; 16 - Michelle Moultrie - Junior	Utility: 1 - Ashley Senedeker - Junior; 9 - Kasey Fagan - Freshman; 12 - Megan Bush - Senior; 23 - Chelsea Howell - Freshman; 44 - Brittany Schutte - Sophomore; 46 - Ellie Langley - Junior

=== Coaches ===
2011 Florida Gators softball coaching staff
- Tim Walton - Head coach - 6th season
- Jennifer Rocha - Assistant coach - 6th season
- Jenny Gladding - Assistant coach - 6th season
- Coy Adkins - Volunteer Assistant Coach - 2nd season

== Schedule ==
Legend
	Florida win
	Florida loss
*	Non-Conference game

2011 Florida Gators softball game log
Regular season

February
Date	Opponent	Site/stadium	Score	Overall record	SEC Record
Feb 11	vs Marshall*	Eddie C. Moore Complex • Clearwater, FL (USF Wilson DeMarini Tournament)	W 17–1	1–0	
Feb 11	vs Florida Gulf Coast*	Eddie C. Moore Complex • Clearwater, FL (USF Wilson DeMarini Tournament)	W 6–0	2–0	
Feb 12	vs Long Island*	Eddie C. Moore Complex • Clearwater, FL (USF Wilson DeMarini Tournament)	W 9–2	3–0	
Feb 12	vs NC State*	Eddie C. Moore Complex • Clearwater, FL (USF Wilson DeMarini Tournament)	W 9–0	4–0	
Feb 13	vs South Florida*	Eddie C. Moore Complex • Clearwater, FL (USF Wilson DeMarini Tournament)	W 12–0	5–0	
Feb 16	at Jacksonville*	JU Softball Complex • Jacksonville, FL	W 7–0	6–0	
Feb 19	No. 22 North Carolina*	Katie Seashole Pressly Softball Stadium • Gainesville, FL	W 3–0	7–0	
Feb 19	No. 22 North Carolina*	Katie Seashole Pressly Softball Stadium • Gainesville, FL	W 9–0	8–0	
Feb 20	No. 22 North Carolina*	Katie Seashole Pressly Softball Stadium • Gainesville, FL	W 10–0	9–0	
Feb 24	vs Indiana*	Big League Dreams Sports Park • Cathedral City, CA (Cathedral City Classic)	W 7–0	10–0	
Feb 24	vs No. 11 Texas*	Big League Dreams Sports Park • Cathedral City, CA	W 6–5	11–0	
Feb 25	vs San Diego State*	Big League Dreams Sports Park • Cathedral City, CA	W 4–2	12–0	
Feb 25	vs No. 2 UCLA*	Big League Dreams Sports Park • Cathedral City, CA	W 4–1	13–0	
Feb 26	vs Utah*	Big League Dreams Sports Park • Cathedral City, CA	W 7–3	14–0	

March
Date	Opponent	Site/stadium	Score	Overall record	SEC Record
Mar 4	Valparaiso*	Katie Seashole Pressly Softball Stadium • Gainesville, FL (Lipton Invitational)	W 13–4	15–0	
Mar 4	Syracuse*	Katie Seashole Pressly Softball Stadium • Gainesville, FL (Lipton Invitational)	W 2–0	16–0	
Mar 5	North Dakota State*	Katie Seashole Pressly Softball Stadium • Gainesville, FL (Lipton Invitational)	W 18–0	17–0	
Mar 5	Pacific*	Katie Seashole Pressly Softball Stadium • Gainesville, FL (Lipton Invitational)	W 10–2	18–0	
Mar 6	North Dakota State*	Katie Seashole Pressly Softball Stadium • Gainesville, FL (Lipton Invitational)	W 9–0	19–0	
Mar 9	at LSU	Tiger Park • Baton Rouge, LA	W 8–1	20–0	1–0
Mar 9	at LSU	Tiger Park • Baton Rouge, LA	W 5–0	21–0	2–0
Mar 11	vs UConn*	Eddie C. Moore Complex • Clearwater, FL (USF Under Armor Showcase)	W 9–0	22–0	
Mar 11	vs Robert Morris*	Eddie C. Moore Complex • Clearwater, FL (USF Under Armor Showcase)	W 6–1	23–0	
Mar 12	vs Ball State*	Eddie C. Moore Complex • Clearwater, FL (USF Under Armor Showcase)	W 21–0	24–0	
Mar 12	vs Nebraska*	Eddie C. Moore Complex • Clearwater, FL (USF Under Armor Showcase)	L 0–1	24–1	
Mar 13	vs South Florida*	Eddie C. Moore Complex • Clearwater, FL (USF Under Armor Showcase)	W 10–2	25–1	
Mar 16	Mississippi State	Katie Seashole Pressly Softball Stadium • Gainesville, FL	W 8–0	26–1	3–0
Mar 16	Mississippi State	Katie Seashole Pressly Softball Stadium • Gainesville, FL	W 18–1	27–1	4–0
Mar 18	at Ole Miss	Ole Miss Softball Complex • Oxford, MS	W 8–0	28–1	5–0
Mar 19	at Ole Miss	Ole Miss Softball Complex • Oxford, MS	W 18–3	29–1	6–0
Mar 20	at Ole Miss	Ole Miss Softball Complex • Oxford, MS	W 11–3	30–1	7–0
Mar 25	Georgia	Katie Seashole Pressly Softball Stadium • Gainesville, FL	L 7–10	30–2	7–1
Mar 26	Georgia	Katie Seashole Pressly Softball Stadium • Gainesville, FL	L 5–13	30–3	7–2
Mar 27	Georgia	Katie Seashole Pressly Softball Stadium • Gainesville, FL	L 1–5	30–4	7–3

April
Date	Opponent	Site/stadium	Score	Overall record	SEC Record
Apr 1	at Kentucky	UK Softball Complex • Lexington, KY	L 2–10	30–5	7–4
Apr 2	at Kentucky	UK Softball Complex • Lexington, KY	L 6–7	30–6	7–5
Apr 3	at Kentucky	UK Softball Complex • Lexington, KY	L 2–9	30–7	7–6
Apr 8	Arkansas	Katie Seashole Pressly Softball Stadium • Gainesville, FL	W 4–0	31–7	8–6
Apr 9	Arkansas	Katie Seashole Pressly Softball Stadium • Gainesville, FL	W 8–1	32–7	9–6
Apr 10	Arkansas	Katie Seashole Pressly Softball Stadium • Gainesville, FL	W 8–0	33–7	10–6
Apr 13	FIU*	Katie Seashole Pressly Softball Stadium • Gainesville, FL	W 8–0	34–7	
Apr 16	at Auburn	Jane B. Moore Field • Auburn, AL	W 14–4	35–7	11–6
Apr 16	at Auburn	Jane B. Moore Field • Auburn, AL	W 8–2	36–7	12–6
Apr 17	at Auburn	Jane B. Moore Field • Auburn, AL	W 13–4	37–7	13–6
Apr 20	UCF*	Katie Seashole Pressly Softball Stadium • Gainesville, FL	W 8–1	38–7	
Apr 22	Alabama	Katie Seashole Pressly Softball Stadium • Gainesville, FL	L 0–5	38–8	13–7
Apr 23	Alabama	Katie Seashole Pressly Softball Stadium • Gainesville, FL	W 6–5	39–8	14–7
Apr 24	Alabama	Katie Seashole Pressly Softball Stadium • Gainesville, FL	W 3–2	40–8	15–7
Apr 29	at South Carolina	Carolina Softball Stadium at Beckham Field • Columbia, SC	W 5–0	41–8	16–7
Apr 30	at South Carolina	Carolina Softball Stadium at Beckham Field • Columbia, SC	W 6–1	42–8	17–7

May
Date	Opponent	Site/stadium	Score	Overall record	SEC Record
May 1	at South Carolina	Carolina Softball Stadium at Beckham Field • Columbia, SC	W 6–1	43–8	18–7
May 4	Florida State*	Katie Seashole Pressly Softball Stadium • Gainesville, FL	W 1–0	44–8	
May 6	Tennessee	Katie Seashole Pressly Softball Stadium • Gainesville, FL	W 4–3	45–8	19–7
May 7	Tennessee	Katie Seashole Pressly Softball Stadium • Gainesville, FL	W 2–0	46–8	20–7
May 8	Tennessee	Katie Seashole Pressly Softball Stadium • Gainesville, FL	W 7–2	47–8	21–7

Postseason

SEC Tournament
Date	Opponent	Rank (Seed)	Site/stadium	Score	Overall record	SECT record
May 12	(7) Auburn	(2)	Ole Miss Softball Complex • Oxford, MS	L 2–6	47–9	0–1

NCAA Gainesville Regional
Date	Opponent	Site/stadium	Score	Overall record	Reg record
May 20	Bethune–Cookman	Katie Seashole Pressly Softball Stadium • Gainesville, FL	W 8–0	48–9	1–0
May 21	UCLA	Katie Seashole Pressly Softball Stadium • Gainesville, FL	W 4–2	49–9	2–0
May 22	UCLA	Katie Seashole Pressly Softball Stadium • Gainesville, FL	L 2–3	49–10	2–1
May 22	UCLA	Katie Seashole Pressly Softball Stadium • Gainesville, FL	W 11–3	50–10	3–1

NCAA Gainesville Super Regional
Date	Opponent	Rank (Seed)	Site/stadium	Score	Overall record	SR record
May 27	(13) Oregon	(4)	Katie Seashole Pressly Softball Stadium • Gainesville, FL	W 9–1	51–10	1–0
May 28	(13) Oregon	(4)	Katie Seashole Pressly Softball Stadium • Gainesville, FL	W 7–0	52–10	2–0

NCAA Women's College World Series
Date	Opponent	Rank (seed)	Site/stadium	Score	Overall record	WCWS Record
June 2	(5) Missouri	(4)	ASA Hall of Fame Stadium • Oklahoma City, OK	W 6–2	53–10	1–0
June 3	(1) Arizona State	(4)	ASA Hall of Fame Stadium • Oklahoma City, OK	L 5–6	53–11	1–1
June 4	(7) California	(4)	ASA Hall of Fame Stadium • Oklahoma City, OK	W 5–2	54–11	2–1
June 5	(2) Alabama	(4)	ASA Hall of Fame Stadium • Oklahoma City, OK	W 16–2	55–11	3–1
June 5	(2) Alabama	(4)	ASA Hall of Fame Stadium • Oklahoma City, OK	W 9–2	56–11	4–1
June 6	(1) Arizona State	(4)	ASA Hall of Fame Stadium • Oklahoma City, OK	L 4–14	56–12	4–2
June 7	(1) Arizona State	(4)	ASA Hall of Fame Stadium • Oklahoma City, OK	L 2–7	56–13	4–3
