= 2011 SEC softball tournament =

2011 Southeastern Conference softball tournament
- Finals site: Ole Miss Softball Complex; Oxford, Mississippi
- Champions: Tennessee (2nd title)
- Runner-up: Georgia (4th title game)
- Winning coach: Ralph Weekly & Karen Weekly (2nd title)
- MVP: Ellen Renfroe (Tennessee)

2011 Southeastern Conference softball standings
	Conf.				Overall
Team	W		L	PCT	W		L	PCT
Eastern
No. 2 Florida ^{x}‍‍‍^{y}	21	–	7	.750	56	–	13	.812
No. 18 Tennessee ‍‍‡‍^{y}	20	–	8	.714	49	–	12	.803
No. 9 Georgia ‍‍‍^{y}	17	–	9	.654	51	–	14	.785
No. 13 Kentucky ‍‍‍^{y}	14	–	9	.609	40	–	16	.714
South Carolina ‍‍‍	6	–	22	.214	26	–	30	.464
Western
No. 3 Alabama ^{x}‍‍‍^{y}	19	–	6	.760	53	–	11	.828
No. 22 LSU ‍‍‍^{y}	19	–	9	.679	40	–	18	.690
Auburn ‍‍‍^{y}	15	–	13	.536	40	–	19	.678
Mississippi State ‍‍‍	10	–	18	.357	24	–	32	.429
Ole Miss ‍‍‍	3	–	23	.115	14	–	39	.264
Arkansas ‍‍‍	3	–	23	.115	13	–	39	.250
x – Division champion ‡ – Tournament champion y – Invited to the NCAA Tournament; As of June 30, 2011; Rankings from NFCA/USA Today

The 2011 SEC softball tournament was held at the Ole Miss Softball Complex on the campus of the University of Mississippi in Oxford, Mississippi on May 12 through May 14, 2011. The winner of the tournament received the conference's automatic bid to the 2011 NCAA Division I softball tournament. The Tennessee Lady Volunteers were the 2011 SEC softball tournament champions.

== Seeds ==
The seeding for the tournament is as follows:

Seed	School	SEC Record
#1	Alabama	19-6 (46-8) [Eliminated]
#2	Florida	21-7 (47-9) [Eliminated]
#3	Tennessee	20-8 (47-10) [Tournament champs]
#4	LSU	19-9 (38-16) [Eliminated]
#5	Georgia	17-9 (46-11) [Eliminated]
#6	Kentucky	14-9 (36-14) [Eliminated]
#7	Auburn	15-13 (39-17) [Eliminated]
#8	Mississippi State	10-18 (24-32) [Eliminated]

== Tournament ==
All times are Central Standard Time.

Quarterfinals; May 12th
3	Tennessee	4
6	Kentucky	1
2	Florida	2
7	Auburn	6
1	Alabama	5
8	Mississippi State	1
4	LSU	0
5	Georgia (5 Innings)	9

Semifinals; May 13th
3	Tennessee	2
7	Auburn	1
1	Alabama	2
5	Georgia	4

Finals; May 14th
3	Tennessee	6
5	Georgia	5

- SEC softball tournament
- SEC Tournament
