= Clint Myers =

College sports coach

Coaching career (HC unless noted)

Baseball
- 1981–1983: Yavapai
- 1984: Eastern Washington (asst.)
- 1996–2005: Central Arizona

Softball
- 1987–1995: Central Arizona
- 2006–2013: Arizona State
- 2014–2017: Auburn

Accomplishments and honors

Awards
- 2× Pac-12 Coach of the Year (2008, 2011); SEC Coach of the Year (2015)

Clint Myers is a retired college softball and college baseball coach, who previously served as head coach of the Arizona State Sun Devils softball team and the Auburn Tigers softball team. In 12 seasons coaching softball, he won a pair of Women's College World Series championships and appeared in seven others.

His tenure at Auburn ended amid allegations of his son, Associate Head Coach Corey Myers, pursuing inappropriate relationships with students.

== Head coaching record ==
Softball, Division I

Record table
Season	Team	Overall	Conference	Standing	Postseason
Arizona State Sun Devils (Pacific-10/Pac-12 Conference) (2006–2013)
2006	Arizona State	53–15	11–10	4th	Women's College World Series
2007	Arizona State	54–17	13–8	2nd	Women's College World Series
2008	Arizona State	66–5	18–3	1st	WCWS champions
2009	Arizona State	47–19	10–11	6th	Women's College World Series
2010	Arizona State	44–17	10–11	4th	NCAA Super Regional
2011	Arizona State	60–6	17–4	1st	WCWS champions
2012	Arizona State	53–11	18–4	2nd	Women's College World Series
2013	Arizona State	50–12	16–8	T-2nd	Women's College World Series
Arizona State:		427–102 (.807)	113–59 (.657)		
Auburn Tigers (Southeastern Conference) (2014–2017)
2014	Auburn	42–19–1	11–13	8th	NCAA Regional
2015	Auburn	56–11	18–6	2nd	Women's College World Series
2016	Auburn	58–12	16–7	4th	WCWS Runner-Up
2017	Auburn	49–12	17–7	2nd	NCAA Super Regional
Auburn:		205–53–1 (.793)	62–33 (.653)		
Total:		633–155–1 (.803)			
National champion Postseason invitational champion Conference regular season champion Conference regular season and conference tournament champion Division regular season champion Division regular season and conference tournament champion Conference tournament champion
