= 2011 Alabama Crimson Tide softball team =

American college softball season

2011 Alabama Crimson Tide softball

SEC Champions

Women's College World Series, 3rd
- Conference: Southeastern Conference
- West
- Record: 53–11 (19–6 SEC)
- Head coach: Patrick Murphy
- Assistant coach: Alyson Habetz
- Pitching coach: Vann Stuedeman
- Home stadium: Rhoads Stadium

2011 Southeastern Conference softball standings
	Conf.				Overall
Team	W		L	PCT	W		L	PCT
Eastern
No. 2 Florida ^{x}‍‍‍^{y}	21	–	7	.750	56	–	13	.812
No. 18 Tennessee ‍‍‡‍^{y}	20	–	8	.714	49	–	12	.803
No. 9 Georgia ‍‍‍^{y}	17	–	9	.654	51	–	14	.785
No. 13 Kentucky ‍‍‍^{y}	14	–	9	.609	40	–	16	.714
South Carolina ‍‍‍	6	–	22	.214	26	–	30	.464
Western
No. 3 Alabama ^{x}‍‍‍^{y}	19	–	6	.760	53	–	11	.828
No. 22 LSU ‍‍‍^{y}	19	–	9	.679	40	–	18	.690
Auburn ‍‍‍^{y}	15	–	13	.536	40	–	19	.678
Mississippi State ‍‍‍	10	–	18	.357	24	–	32	.429
Ole Miss ‍‍‍	3	–	23	.115	14	–	39	.264
Arkansas ‍‍‍	3	–	23	.115	13	–	39	.250
x – Division champion ‡ – Tournament champion y – Invited to the NCAA Tournament; As of June 30, 2011; Rankings from NFCA/USA Today

The 2011 Alabama Crimson Tide softball team was an American softball team that represented the University of Alabama for the 2011 NCAA softball season. The Crimson Tide played its home games at Rhoads Stadium. The 2011 made the postseason for the 13th straight year, and the Women's College World Series for seventh time after failing to make it in 2010. This season represented the 15th season of softball in the school's history. The Crimson Tide won the SEC Regular Season by defeating the Ole Miss Rebels 10-1.

== Season ==
While the Tide loses two-time SEC Player of the Year Charlotte Morgan along with 2010 senior leaders Alex Blewitt and Jessica Smith, Alabama returns nine starters from a team that won the Southeastern Conference regular season and tournament championships en route to claiming the number one overall seed in the NCAA Division I tournament. The Crimson Tide softball team only has two seniors this season, Kelsi Dunne and Whitney Larsen. In the annual Southeastern Conference coaches preseason poll, the Crimson Tide was picked to win the 2011 SEC Softball title. The Crimson Tide also landed three players on the Preseason All-SEC team; Kelsi Dunne, Whitney Larsen, and Kayla Braud.

== Roster ==
2011 Alabama Crimson Tide roster
Pitchers: 00 Kelsi Dunne – senior; 11 Lauren Sewell – sophomore; 33 Jackie Traina – freshman; Outfielders: 1 Kayla Braud – sophomore; 2 Jazlyn Lunceford – junior; 3 Keima Davis – sophomore; 7 Jennifer Fenton – junior; Utility: 18 Cassie Reilly-Boccia – junior	Catchers: 6 Jordan Patterson – freshman; 12 Kendall Dawson – junior; 24 Olivia Gibson – junior; Infielders: 4 Jackey Branham – sophomore; 9 Courtney Conley – sophomore; 10 Kaila Hunt – freshman; 20 Whitney Larsen – senior; 22 Amanda Locke – junior; 32 Ryan Iamurri – freshman

2011 Alabama Crimson Tide Softball Roster

== Schedule ==
Date	Time	Opponent	Rank^{#}	Site	Result	Attendance	Winning Pitcher	Losing Pitcher
Hibbett/Easton All-Alabama Softball Classic
February 11*	6:00 PM	Samford Bulldogs	#6	Liberty Park • Vestavia Hills, AL	W 8–0^{(5)}	500	J. Traina	R. Harmon
February 12*	1:30 PM	Alabama A&M Bulldogs	#6	Liberty Park • Vestavia Hills, AL	W 18–0^{(5)}	500	L. Sewell	V. Kersten
February 12*	4:00 PM	Jacksonville State Gamecocks	#6	Liberty Park • Vestavia Hills, AL	W 6–0	500	K. Dunne	T. Harbin
February 13*	11:00 AM	South Alabama Jaguars	#6	Liberty Park • Vestavia Hills, AL	W 6–0	500	J. Traina	H. Campbell
February 13*	1:30 PM	Troy Trojans	#6	Liberty Park • Vestavia Hills, AL	W 9–1^{(6)}	500	K. Dunne	H. Hutchins
Bama Bash
February 18*	4:00 PM	Louisville Cardinals	#7	Rhoads Stadium • Tuscaloosa, AL	W 10–2^{(5)}	2,482	K. Dunne	T. Collins
February 18*	6:00 PM	UTSA Roadrunners	#7	Rhoads Stadium • Tuscaloosa, AL	W 13–5^{(6)}	2,482	L. Sewell	M. Luksa
February 19*	1:00 PM	Syracuse Orange	#7	Rhoads Stadium • Tuscaloosa, AL	W 9–0^{(5)}	2,801	K. Dunne	J. Caira
February 19*	4:00 PM	Louisville Cardinals	#7	Rhoads Stadium • Tuscaloosa, AL	W 9–8	2,801	K. Dunne	T. Collins
February 20*	1:00 PM	Syracuse Orange	#7	Rhoads Stadium • Tuscaloosa, AL	W 20–5^{(5)}	2,497	J. Traina	S. Kuwik
February 22*	6:00 PM	UAB Blazers	#5	UAB Softball Field • Birmingham, AL	W 3–0	350	K. Dunne	L. Streetman
USF Fairfield Inn and Suites Tampa North Tournament
February 25*	11:30 AM	Illinois State Redbirds	#5	USF Softball Field • Tampa, FL	W 7–0	150	J. Traina	C. Burton
February 25*	3:30 PM	Central Connecticut Blue Devils	#5	USF Softball Field • Tampa, FL	W 17–1^{(5)}	150	L. Sewell	J. Tingley
February 26*	9:30 AM	Western Michigan Broncos	#5	USF Softball Field • Tampa, FL	W 12–4^{(6)}	200	L. Sewell	D. Patterson
February 26*	11:30 AM	#16 Missouri Tigers	#5	USF Softball Field • Tampa, FL	W 3–1	400	K. Dunne	C. Thomas
February 27*	11:30 AM	South Florida Bulls	#5	USF Softball Field • Tampa, FL	W 12–1^{(5)}	500	J. Traina	C. Catalano
Citrus Classic
March 4*	10:00 AM	Notre Dame Fighting Irish	#3	Wide World of Sports • Lake Buena Vista, FL	W 4–1	420	J. Traina	L. Valdivia
March 4*	12:30 PM	#17 LA-Lafayette Ragin' Cajuns	#3	Wide World of Sports • Lake Buena Vista, FL	L 0–1	300	A. Brignac	K. Dunne
March 5*	10:00 AM	Fordham Rams	#3	Wide World of Sports • Lake Buena Vista, FL	W 3–1	250	J. Traina	C. Plimpton
March 5*	3:00 PM	#13 Oregon Ducks	#3	Wide World of Sports • Lake Buena Vista, FL	W 10–0^{(5)}	300	K. Dunne	J. Moore
March 6*	8:00 AM	Virginia Cavaliers	#3	Wide World of Sports • Lake Buena Vista, FL	W 4–0	300	J. Traina	M. Mitchell
March 9*	6:00 PM	Georgia Tech Yellow Jackets		Mewborn Field • Atlanta, GA	Canceled			
Easton SEC/ACC Challenge
March 11*	6:00 PM	North Carolina Tar Heels	#3	Rhoads Stadium • Tuscaloosa, AL	W 3–0	2,343	K. Dunne	L. Spingola
March 12*	1:30 PM	Florida State Seminoles	#3	Rhoads Stadium • Tuscaloosa, AL	W 8–0^{(5)}	2,802	K. Dunne	S. Hamilton
March 12*	4:00 PM	North Carolina Tar Heels	#3	Rhoads Stadium • Tuscaloosa, AL	W 10–1^{(5)}	2,802	J. Traina	S. Buchholz
March 13*	1:30 PM	Florida State Seminoles	#3	Rhoads Stadium • Tuscaloosa, AL	W 9–2	2,502	J. Traina	M. Bullock
March 16	5:00 PM	#23 Auburn Tigers	#3	Rhoads Stadium • Tuscaloosa, AL	W 6–1	3,003	K. Dunne	L. Schmalz
March 16	7:30 PM	#23 Auburn Tigers	#3	Rhoads Stadium • Tuscaloosa, AL	W 8–2	3,256	J. Traina	J. Loree
March 18	6:30 PM	#1 Georgia Bulldogs	#3	Rhoads Stadium • Tuscaloosa, AL	W 2–1	2,922	K. Dunne	A. Owen
March 19	7:00 PM	#1 Georgia Bulldogs	#3	Rhoads Stadium • Tuscaloosa, AL	W 6–4	3,261	J. Traina	M. Montemayor
March 20	1:30 PM	#1 Georgia Bulldogs	#3	Rhoads Stadium • Tuscaloosa, AL	W 9–5	3,089	K. Dunne	I. Arevalo
March 22	3:00 PM	#11 Tennessee Volunteers	#1	Lee Stadium • Knoxville, TN	W 9–5	1,650	K. Dunne	E. Renfroe
March 22	5:30 PM	#11 Tennessee Volunteers	#1	Lee Stadium • Knoxville, TN	L 1–4	1,650	E. Renfroe	J. Traina
March 25	6:30 PM	Arkansas Razorbacks	#1	Rhoads Stadium • Tuscaloosa, AL	W 10–1^{(5)}	2,641	J. Traina	H. McLemore
March 26	1:30 PM	Arkansas Razorbacks	#1	Rhoads Stadium • Tuscaloosa, AL	W 12–3^{(5)}	2,452	K. Dunne	K. Jones
March 27	1:30 PM	Arkansas Razorbacks	#1	Rhoads Stadium • Tuscaloosa, AL	W 9–0^{(5)}	2,562	K. Dunne	K. Jones
March 31*	5:00 PM	College of Charleston Cougars	#1	Patriots Point • Charleston, SC	W 7–1	215	L. Sewell	A. Datko
April 1	5:00 PM	South Carolina Gamecocks	#1	Beckham Field • Columbia, SC	W 7–0	421	K. Dunne	A. Borchardt
April 2	1:00 PM	South Carolina Gamecocks	#1	Beckham Field • Columbia, SC	W 7–0	754	J. Traina	A. Chastain
April 3	11:00 AM	South Carolina Gamecocks	#1	Beckham Field • Columbia, SC	W 1–0	737	K. Dunne	A. Broyles
April 8	6:00 PM	LSU Lady Tigers	#1	Tiger Park • Baton Rouge, LA	L 1–2^{(14)}	1,503	B. Mack	K. Dunne
April 9	3:00 PM	LSU Lady Tigers	#1	Tiger Park • Baton Rouge, LA	L 1–3^{(10)}	2,563	R. Fico	J. Traina
April 10	1:00 PM	LSU Lady Tigers	#1	Tiger Park • Baton Rouge, LA	L 0–2	1,865	B. Mack	J. Traina
April 12*	6:00 PM	Troy Trojans	#5	Troy Softball Complex • Troy, AL	W 5–2	1,351	J. Traina	A. Williams
April 16	2:00 PM	Mississippi State Bulldogs	#5	Rhoads Stadium • Tuscaloosa, AL	W 6–2	3,132	K. Dunne	S. Becker
April 16	4:30 PM	Mississippi State Bulldogs	#5	Rhoads Stadium • Tuscaloosa, AL	W 13–3^{(6)}	3,395	J. Traina	K. Vry
April 17	1:30 PM	Mississippi State Bulldogs	#5	Rhoads Stadium • Tuscaloosa, AL	W 5–2	3,064	K. Dunne	S. Becker
April 22	4:00 PM	#8 Florida Gators	#4	Pressly Softball Stadium • Gainesville, FL	W 5–0	1,339	K. Dunne	S. Brombacher
April 23	3:00 PM	#8 Florida Gators	#4	Pressly Softball Stadium • Gainesville, FL	L 5–6	1,905	H. Rogers	K. Dunne
April 24	12:00 PM	#8 Florida Gators	#4	Pressly Softball Stadium • Gainesville, FL	L 2–3^{(9)}	1,011	H. Rogers	J. Traina
April 27*	6:00 PM	UAB Blazers	#7	Rhoads Stadium • Tuscaloosa, AL	Canceled			
April 29†	6:30 PM	#18 Kentucky Wildcats	#7	Rhoads Stadium • Tuscaloosa, AL	Canceled			
April 30†	1:30 PM	#18 Kentucky Wildcats	#7	Rhoads Stadium • Tuscaloosa, AL	Canceled			
May 1†	1:30 PM	#18 Kentucky Wildcats	#7	Rhoads Stadium • Tuscaloosa, AL	Canceled			
May 6	5:00 PM	Ole Miss Rebels	#6	Ole Miss Softball Complex • Oxford, MS	W 8–0^{(5)}	307	K. Dunne	K. Bruning
May 7	1:00 PM	Ole Miss Rebels	#6	Ole Miss Softball Complex • Oxford, MS	W 18–1^{(5)}	403	J. Traina	B. Barnhill
May 8	1:00 PM	Ole Miss Rebels	#6	Ole Miss Softball Complex • Oxford, MS	W 10–1	409	K. Dunne	L. Perry
SEC Tournament
May 12*	6:30 PM	Mississippi State Bulldogs	#4	Ole Miss Softball Complex • Oxford, MS	W 5–1	1,080	K. Dunne	S. Becker
May 13*	4:30 PM	#8 Georgia Bulldogs	#4	Ole Miss Softball Complex • Oxford, MS	L 2–4	1,163	M. Montemayor	J. Traina
NCAA Tuscaloosa Regional
May 20*	6:00 PM	Jackson State Tigers	#4	Rhoads Stadium • Tuscaloosa, AL	W 8–0^{(5)}	1,917	J. Traina	T. Sims
May 21*	1:00 PM	Memphis Tigers	#4	Rhoads Stadium • Tuscaloosa, AL	W 7–1	1,958	K. Dunne	C. Hummel
May 22*	1:00 PM	Chattanooga Mocs	#4	Rhoads Stadium • Tuscaloosa, AL	W 11–2^{(6)}	2,028	K. Dunne	K. Irwin
NCAA Tuscaloosa Super Regional
May 26*	7:00 PM	#11 Stanford Cardinal	#4	Rhoads Stadium • Tuscaloosa, AL	L 2–5	1,686	T. Gerhart	K. Dunne
May 27*	3:30 PM	#11 Stanford Cardinal	#4	Rhoads Stadium • Tuscaloosa, AL	W 10–0^{(5)}	1,984	K. Dunne	T. Gerhart
May 27*	6:00 PM	#11 Stanford Cardinal	#4	Rhoads Stadium • Tuscaloosa, AL	W 1–0	2,144	J. Traina	T. Gerhart
Women's College World Series
June 2*	12:00 PM	#7 California Golden Bears	#4	ASA Hall of Fame Stadium • Oklahoma City, OK	W 1–0	7,280	K. Dunne	J. Henderson
June 3*	6:00 PM	#17 Baylor Bears	#4	ASA Hall of Fame Stadium • Oklahoma City, OK	W 3–0	8,672	K. Dunne	W. Canion
June 5*	12:00 PM	#3 Florida Gators	#4	ASA Hall of Fame Stadium • Oklahoma City, OK	L 2–16^{(5)}	7,726	S. Brombacher	K. Dunne
June 5*	6:00 PM	#3 Florida Gators	#4	ASA Hall of Fame Stadium • Oklahoma City, OK	L 2–9	5,447	H. Rogers	K. Dunne
*Non-Conference Game. ^{#}Rankings from NFCA released prior to game.All times are in Central Time Zone.

- † In light of the tornado that caused massive damage in the Tuscaloosa area on April 27, the Alabama softball team's weekend series with Kentucky, scheduled to be played at Rhoads Stadium on April 29-May 1 was canceled and not be made up.

== Scoring by inning ==
Inning	1	2	3	4	5	6	7	EX	TOTAL
Opponents	27	16	18	17	15	15	12	6	126
Alabama	88	77	64	86	47	48	26	2	438

== Ranking movement ==
Poll	Pre	Wk 1	Wk 2	Wk 3	Wk 4	Wk 5	Wk 6	Wk 7	Wk 8	Wk 9	Wk 10	Wk 11	Wk 12	Wk 13	Wk 14	Final
NFCA	6	7	5	3	3	3	1	1	1	5	4	7	6	4	4	
USA Softball	3	3	2	1	2	2	1	1	1	3	3	6	5	4	3	

== Awards and honors ==
- Kelsi Dunne

SEC Pitcher of the Year
Finalists for USA Softball Collegiate Player of the Year
First Team All-SEC
SEC All-Defensive team

- Whitney Larsen

First Team All-SEC
SEC All-Defensive team
SEC All-Tournament Team

- Kayla Braud

Finalists for USA Softball Collegiate Player of the Year
First Team All-SEC
Capital One Academic All-America

- Amanda Locke

Second Team All-SEC

- Kaila Hunt

Freshman All-SEC team

- Kendall Dawson

SEC All-Defensive team

- Jazlyn Lunceford

SEC All-Defensive team

- Jennifer Fenton

SEC All-Tournament Team

== See also ==
- 2011 Alabama Crimson Tide baseball team
