= Megan Bartlett =

American softball coach

Current position
- Title: Head coach
- Team: Arizona State
- Conference: Big 12
- Record: 122–96 (.560)

Biographical details
- Born: May 13, 1983 (age 43)
- Education: Notre Dame

Playing career
- 2002–2005: Notre Dame

Coaching career (HC unless noted)
- 2005–2007: Loyola (Grad. asst.)
- 2007–2012: Northern Illinois (asst.)
- 2013–2014: DePaul (Vol. asst.)
- 2014–2015: Purdue (asst.)
- 2016–2020: Ball State
- 2021–2022: Texas (asst.)
- 2023–present: Arizona State

Head coaching record
- Overall: 263–204 (.563)

Megan Ciolli Bartlett (born May 13, 1983) is an American former softball player and current head coach at Arizona State. She previously served as the head coach at Ball State.

== Playing career ==
Bartlett played college softball for Notre Dame from 2002 to 2005. She helped lead the Irish to four Big East regular season championships, four NCAA Regional appearances and two Big East Tournament titles. A two-time National Fastpitch Coaches Association All-American, she captained the 2005 team to a 46–15 record and helped secure Notre Dame's first NCAA Regional home games.

== Coaching career ==
Bartlett began her coaching career as a graduate assistant at Loyola from 2005 to 2007. The Ramblers won the 2007 Horizon League regular-season championship and the Loyola coaches earned Horizon League Coaching Staff of the Year that season. She then served as an assistant coach at Northern Illinois from 2007 to 2012, where she worked as recruiting, offensive and camp coordinator for the Huskies. She then served as a volunteer assistant coach at DePaul from 2013 to 2014. During the 2014 season, the Blue Demons won the Big East Conference regular-season and tournament championships before earning a berth in the 2014 NCAA Lexington Regional. She then served as assistant coach at Purdue for the 2015 season.

=== Ball State ===
On July 22, 2015, Bartlett was named head coach of the Ball State Cardinals softball team. As the head coach at Ball State for five seasons, she led the program to a 141–108 overall record while registering three consecutive 30-win seasons from 2017 to 2019. Over that stretch, she helped lead the Cardinals to the 2018 Mid-American Conference (MAC) West Division title with that season's 37 victories, marking the fourth-most wins in a single season in program history.

=== Texas ===
On June 26, 2020, Bartlett was named an assistant coach of the Texas Longhorns softball team. In her first season with Texas in 2021, she helped lead them to a 43–14 overall record, a No. 12 final ranking and a berth in the NCAA Stillwater Super Regional. The team set program records for team batting average, (.342), slugging (.561) and on-base percentage (.419). During her second season with Texas in 2022, she helped lead the team to a 47–22–1 record, and their first appearance in the Women's College World Series championship series.

=== Arizona State ===
On June 22, 2022, Bartlett was named head coach of the Arizona State Sun Devils softball team.

== Personal life ==
Bartlett is married to former professional ice hockey player Mike Bartlett. She has two daughters, Vivian and Maren.

== Head coaching record ==
Record table
Season	Team	Overall	Conference	Standing	Postseason
Ball State (Mid-American Conference) (2016–2020)
2016	Ball State	22–32	8–16	6th	
2017	Ball State	30–28	14–10	3rd	
2018	Ball State	37–19	16–7	2nd	
2019	Ball State	34–20	9–8	6th	
2020	Ball State	18–9	0–0		Season canceled due to COVID-19
Ball State:		141–108 (.566)	61–46 (.570)		
Arizona State (Pac-12 Conference) (2023–2025)
2023	Arizona State	22–26	6–18	T-8th	
2024	Arizona State	20–31	3–21	9th	
Arizona State (Big 12 Conference) (2025–present)
2025	Arizona State	35–21	14–10	5th	NCAA Regional
2026	Arizona State	45–18	11–13	6th	NCAA Super Regional
Arizona State:		122–96 (.560)	34–62 (.354)		
Total:		263–204 (.563)			
National champion Postseason invitational champion Conference regular season champion Conference regular season and conference tournament champion Division regular season champion Division regular season and conference tournament champion Conference tournament champion
