= Krista Donnenwirth =

American softball player

Personal information
- Full name: Krista Lynn Donnenwirth
- Nationality: American
- Born: June 12, 1989 (age 37) Torrance, California, United States
- Height: 6 ft 0 in (183 cm)

Sport
- Country: USA
- Sport: Softball
- College team: Arizona State Sun Devils

Krista Lynn Donnenwirth (born June 12, 1989) is an All-American softball player. She attended Capistrano Valley High School. After graduating from high school, she went on to attend Arizona State University, where she plays shortstop and third base.

== Early life and family ==
Born in Torrance, California, Donnenwirth is the daughter of Bill Donnenwirth and Sarah Donnenwirth. She has one older brother, Dana Donnenwirth. At a young age Donnenwirth and her family moved to Mission Viejo, California where they still reside today. She attended Capistrano Valley High School where she played softball and basketball. Donnenwirth lettered in both sports, but she excelled at softball, winning the league MVP and making All-CIF First Team.

== Arizona State softball career ==
During the 2008 season she was named NFCA Third-Team All-American, First-Team All-Pac-10 and Pac-10 Newcomer of the Year after posting a .354 batting average, fifteen home runs, 74 RBIs, 37 runs and a .632 slugging percentage in leading the Sun Devils to the 2008 National Championship, the team's first NCAA title. Donnenwirth delivered a dominating performance during game one of the 2008 NCAA Championship Series, going 3-for-3 and driving in all three Sun Devil runs in a 3–0 shutout victory over Texas A&M.

During the 2009 season she posted a .322 batting average, nine home runs, 47 RBIs, 31 runs and a .523 slugging percentage.

In the 2010 season, she made her season debut on February 26, 2010, going 0 for 4 with a strikeout and a sacrifice bunt in an 8–7 win over South Florida. She finished the 2010 season with a .307 batting average, five home runs, 25 RBIs, 24 runs and a .443 slugging percentage.

During the 2011 season she posted a .328 batting average, seven home runs, 54 RBIs, 31 runs and a .503 slugging percentage in leading the Sun Devils to the 2011 National Championship. In the first game of the final series against Florida, Donnenwirth hit two home runs leading the Sun Devils to a 14–4 victory. In the final game of her college career, Donnenwirth went 1 for 3 with a walk, as Arizona State clinched the 2011 title with a 7–2 victory over Florida.

== Arizona State education ==
Donnenwirth graduated in 2012, receiving both a Bachelor of Science in Nutrition and Bachelor of Arts in Psychology

== Personal life ==
On October 10, 2009, Donnenwirth was arrested by Mesa Police and charged with driving under the influence after being involved in a two-car crash in which she was accused of hitting another car that had been sitting at a red light. Her blood alcohol content was measured at 0.14, above the Arizona legal limit of 0.08. The original incident report stated that Donnenwirth was cooperative during the on-scene investigation and that she informed the officers she was an Arizona State softball player. Following the incident, Donnenwirth was suspended indefinitely by Arizona State coach Clint Myers for violating team rules. She was later reinstated and returned to the team after missing the first 11 games of the 2010 season.

== Career statistics ==
Year	Team	GP	GS	AB	R	H	HR	RBI	BB	SO	Avg.	OBP	SLG	E	FLD%
2008	Arizona State	70	69	212	37	75	15	74	27	21	.354	.421	.632	9	.945
2009	Arizona State	62	62	174	31	56	9	47	26	22	.322	.410	.523	6	.968
2010	Arizona State	50	50	140	24	43	5	25	28	21	.307	.424	.443	8	.953
2011	Arizona State	66	66	177	31	58	7	54	42	15	.328	.462	.503	3	.981
	Career	248	247	703	123	232	36	200	123	79				26	
