= Arizona State Sun Devils softball =

- Founded: 1967; 59 years ago
- University: Arizona State University
- Athletic director: Graham Rossini
- Head coach: Megan Bartlett (3rd season)
- Conference: Big 12
- Location: Tempe, Arizona, US
- Home stadium: Alberta B. Farrington Softball Stadium (capacity: 1,535)
- Nickname: Sun Devils
- Colors: Maroon and gold

NCAA Tournament champions
- 2008, 2011

AIAW Tournament champions
- 1972, 1973

NCAA WCWS appearances
- 1982, 1987, 1999, 2002, 2006, 2007, 2008, 2009, 2011, 2012, 2013, 2018

AIAW WCWS appearances
- 1971, 1972, 1973, 1976, 1977, 1978, 1979

NCAA super regional appearances
- 2006, 2007, 2008, 2009, 2010, 2011, 2012, 2013, 2018, 2022, 2026

NCAA Tournament appearances
- 1982, 1984, 1985, 1986, 1987, 1989, 1990, 1991, 1993, 1997, 1998, 1999, 2000, 2001, 2002, 2003, 2005, 2006, 2007, 2008, 2009, 2010, 2011, 2012, 2013, 2014, 2015, 2017, 2018, 2019, 2021, 2022, 2025, 2026

Conference tournament championships
- 2026

Regular-season conference championships
- 1977, 1978, 2008, 2011, 2022

The Arizona State Sun Devils softball team represents Arizona State University in NCAA Division I College softball. The team competes in the Big 12 Conference, and plays its home games at Alberta B. Farrington Softball Stadium in Tempe, Arizona. Clint Myers, former head coach of the Sun Devils, guided the team to the Women's College World Series in 2006, 2007, 2008, 2009, 2011, 2012, and 2013. The Sun Devils team won the National Championship in 2008 and 2011.

== History ==
=== 1960s and 1970s ===
The Sun Devil softball team began in 1967. By the 1970s, the team had been established under head coach Mary Littlewood as a power. Some of the best players in the country became Sun Devils in the early 1970s. Among them were: Paula Miller; Marilyn Rau; Ginger Kurtz and Judy Hoke. All of these women at one time during their playing careers were selected as Amateur Softball Association All-Americans. The 1972 and 1973 teams won the Women's College World Series, which at the time was not organized by the NCAA but by the Association for Intercollegiate Athletics for Women (AIAW) and the Amateur Softball Association. The softball team continued to grow throughout the 1970s. They joined the Intermountain Conference in 1975. From 1976 to 1979, the Sun Devils made the AIAW Women's College World Series every year including a fourth-place finish in 1976 and 1977 and two ninth-place finishes in 1978 and 1979. The Sun Devils also finished first in the Intermountain Conference in 1977 and 1978 for the school's first conference championships.

=== 1980s and 1990s ===
Mary Littlewood continued to guide the Arizona State softball team throughout the 1980s. Arizona State joined the Western Collegiate Athletic Association in 1980 and won the conference in 1980. In 1982, the NCAA officially began to sponsor softball. The 1982 Sun Devil softball team went to the NCAA Women's College World Series in its first year organized by the NCAA. They finished fourth that year. From 1984 to 1987, ASU made four straight trips to NCAA Regionals and returned to the Women's College World Series in 1987 where they finished 7th. In 1986, the Pac-10 Conference began softball play with Arizona State as one of its members. They finished second in the conference in their first two seasons with the new conference. Mary Littlewood retired in 1989 after a long, successful run of coaching. She finished with 493 wins, won three conference championships, and made 13 trips to the postseason, nine of which were Women's College World Series appearances.

Linda Wells, who came to Arizona State from Minnesota, was chosen to replace Littlewood for the 1990 season. In her first two seasons with the Sun Devils, the team won 43 both years and made NCAA Regionals both years also. The 1991 team went 15-5 in the competitive Pac-10 conference, which was good enough for a second-place finish. However, in the years following the 1991 season, the Sun Devils softball team began to slide slightly. The made a Regional in 1993, but failed to do so again until 1997. The program began to rebound in 1999 when they finished 7th at the Women's College World Series and finished the season with a 41-28 record.

=== 2000s ===
Despite struggling to finish above .500 in a very competitive Pac-12 conference, Arizona State continued to receive bids to the NCAA Tournament from 2000 to 2003, including an appearance in the Women's College World Series in 2002, again barely missing out on a chance to play for the national championship. Following a loss to Hofstra in the 2005 NCAA Tournament, Wells announced her retirement. She finished her career with the Sun Devils with 563 wins, surpassing Mary Littlewood for the most wins in school history, and two Women's College World Series appearances.

Clint Myers, who came from the junior college ranks, was hired to replace Linda Wells as head coach and has elevated the program to new level. His first season in 2006 saw the Sun Devils win a then school record 53 games and make a trip to Oklahoma City for the Women's College World Series. The Sun Devils have made the Women's College World Series in five of his first six seasons. Myers has also guided the Sun Devil program to its first ever Pac-10 Conference championship in 2008. The Sun Devils finished off the 2000s making four straight appearances in the Women's College World Series. The 2008 softball team captured the first ever NCAA Championship for softball for the school.

=== 2008 National Championship ===
The 2008 Sun Devil softball team finished the season with a school record 66 wins with only 5 losses. They also earned a school record 18 wins in the Pac-10 on their way to the conference championship. They earned a number six national seed to begin the NCAA tournament and hosted both the Regional and Super Regionals. The team shut out Stony Brook and Hawaii twice to earn a spot in Super Regionals. They played the 11-seeded Northwestern Wildcats in the Tempe Super Regional where they won the first two games of the series 3-1 and 9-0. In the first game of the 2008 Women's College World Series, Arizona State defeated Alabama, who was the tournament's three seed, 3-1. The Sun Devils had to score three runs in the 7th inning to beat the Crimson Tide. They then faced the UCLA Bruins, who they defeated 4-0 for a spot in the National Semifinals where they had to face Alabama again. The Sun Devils again defeated Alabama 3-1 for a spot in the National Championship three game series against the Texas A&M Aggies. The first game saw the Sun Devils defeat the Aggies 3-0. In game two, the Arizona State clinched the school's first national championship by beating the Aggies 11-0, which was one of the largest defeats in a championship game in the history of the Women's College World Series.

=== 2010s ===
Arizona State softball continues to be ranked among the best in the country. In 2010, the Sun Devils won 44 games and lost to the Florida Gators in the NCAA Gainesville Super Regional, which was the first time in the Clint Myers era the Sun Devils did not make the Women's College World Series. In 2011, the Sun Devils won their second Pac-10 championship and earned the number one seed in the NCAA tournament. The Sun Devils again earned a spot in the 2011 Women's College World Series by winning the Tempe Super Regional against Texas A&M. The Sun Devils subsequently swept the WCWS and defeated the Florida Gators in two games for the 2011 NCAA national championship. The championship marked the 400th national championship in Pac-10 conference history and at the time Arizona state would become only the fourth softball program to win multiple NCAA titles joining Arizona, Texas A&M, and UCLA.

== Head coaches ==
Name	Years	Seasons	Won	Lost	Tie	Pct.
No Coach	1968–1969	2	0	0	0	.000
Mary Littlewood	1967/1970 –1989	21	509	223	1	.695
Linda Wells	1990–2005	16	561	415	0	.575
Clint Myers	2006–2013	8	427	102	0	.807
Craig Nicholson	2014–2015	2	82	34	1	.705
Robert Wagner & Lefty Olivarez	2016	1	32	26	0	.552
Trisha Ford	2017–2022	5	212	89	0	.704
Megan Bartlett	2023–present	3	77	78	0	.497
All-Time		58	1,900	966	2	.663

== Year-by-year results ==
Season	Coach	Record		Notes
Season	Coach	Overall	Conference	Notes
Independent
1967	Mary Littlewood	5–1	—	
1968		No Records	—	
1969		No Records	—	
1970	Mary Littlewood	10–2	—	
1971	Mary Littlewood	12–3	—	DGWS Women's College World Series
1972	Mary Littlewood	13–2	—	DGWS Women's College World Series Champions
1973	Mary Littlewood	13–2	—	AIAW Women's College World Series Champions
1974	Mary Littlewood	8–4	—	
Intermountain Conference
1975	Mary Littlewood	15–3	9–2	Regional
1976	Mary Littlewood	22–7	13–4	AIAW Women's College World Series
1977	Mary Littlewood	26–7	13–1	AIAW Women's College World Series
1978	Mary Littlewood	29–5	13–3	AIAW Women's College World Series
1979	Mary Littlewood	28–7	10–0	AIAW Women's College World Series
Western Collegiate Athletic Association
1980	Mary Littlewood	33–11	15–3	Regional
1981	Mary Littlewood	35–17	6–6	Regional
1982	Mary Littlewood	34–18	11–9	NCAA Women's College World Series
1983	Mary Littlewood	22–19–1	9–12–1	
1984	Mary Littlewood	33–15	6–4	NCAA Regional
1985	Mary Littlewood	38–17	6–6	NCAA Regional
Pac-12 Conference
1986	Mary Littlewood	32–17	7–4	NCAA Regional
1987	Mary Littlewood	41–15	6–4	Women's College World Series
1988	Mary Littlewood	26–25	8–12	
1989	Mary Littlewood	34–26	7–13	NCAA Regional
1990	Linda Wells	43–32	10–10	NCAA Regional
1991	Linda Wells	43–18	15–5	NCAA Regional
1992	Linda Wells	27–21	7–9	
1993	Linda Wells	34–26	13–11	NCAA Regional
1994	Linda Wells	22–41	7–17	
1995	Linda Wells	29–26	10–18	
1996	Linda Wells	34–27	10–18	
1997	Linda Wells	32–25	9–19	NCAA Regional
1998	Linda Wells	38–27	9–19	NCAA Regional
1999	Linda Wells	41–28	8–20	Women's College World Series
2000	Linda Wells	43–20	8–13	NCAA Regional
2001	Linda Wells	36–22	9–12	NCAA Regional
2002	Linda Wells	46–20	10–11	Women's College World Series
2003	Linda Wells	32–25	7–14	NCAA Regional
2004	Linda Wells	33–31	3–17	
2005	Linda Wells	30–26	4–17	NCAA Regional
2006	Clint Myers	53–15	11–10	Women's College World Series
2007	Clint Myers	54–17	13–8	Women's College World Series
2008	Clint Myers	66–5	18–3	Pac-10 Champions, Women's College World Series Champions
2009	Clint Myers	47–19	10–11	Women's College World Series
2010	Clint Myers	44–17	10–11	NCAA Super Regional
2011	Clint Myers	60–6	17–4	Pac-10 Champions, Women's College World Series Champions
2012	Clint Myers	53–11	18–4	Women's College World Series
2013	Clint Myers	50–12	16–8	Women's College World Series
2014	Craig Nicholson	46–12–1	15–7–1	NCAA Regional
2015	Craig Nicholson	36–22	12–11	NCAA Regional
2016	Robert Wagner & Letty Olivarez	32–26	6–17	NCAA Regional
2017	Trisha Ford	31–22	9–15	NCAA Regional
2018	Trisha Ford	48–13	16–8	Women's College World Series
2019	Trisha Ford	35–20	13–11	NCAA Regional
2020	Trisha Ford	22–7 (Note: The season was not played past March 8 due to the COVID-19 pandemic in the United States.)	0–0	Postseason not held
2021	Trisha Ford	33–16	12–9	NCAA Regional
2022	Trisha Ford	43–11	20-4	NCAA Super Regional
2023	Megan Bartlett	22–26	6-18	
2024	Megan Bartlett	20–31	3-21	
Big 12 Conference
2025	Megan Bartlett	35–21	14-10	NCAA Regional

=== NCAA Tournament seeding history ===
National seeding began in 2005. The Arizona State Sun Devils have been a national seed 12 of the 20 tournaments.

Years →	'06	'07	'08	'09	'10	'11	'12	'13	'14	'18	'21	'22
Seeds →	6	7	6	10	13	1	3	5	9	8	15	8

== Notable players ==
=== National awards ===
NFCA Catcher of the Year

- Amber Freeman (2013)

=== Conference awards ===
Pac-12 Player of the Year

- Jodi Rathbun (1987)
- Kaitlin Cochran (2007, 2008, 2009)
- Amber Freeman (2013)

Pac-12 Pitcher of the Year

- Katie Burkhart (2007, 2008)

Pac-12 Freshman of the Year

- Kaitlin Cochran (2006)
- Krista Donnenwirth (2008)
- Dallas Escobedo (2011)

Pac-12 Defensive Player of the Year

- Mindy Cowles (2008)

Pac-12 Coach of the Year

- Clint Myers (2008, 2011)
- Trisha Ford (2018, 2022)

== See also ==
- List of NCAA Division I softball programs
