= 2013 NCAA Division I softball season =

American college softball season

- Defending Champions: Alabama

Tournament

Women's College World Series
- Champions: Oklahoma (2nd title)
- Runners-up: Tennessee (6th WCWS Appearance)
- Winning Coach: Patty Gasso (2nd title)
- WCWS MOP: Keilani Ricketts (Oklahoma)

Seasons
- ← 2012 2014 →

The 2013 NCAA Division I softball season, play of college softball in the United States organized by the National Collegiate Athletic Association (NCAA) at the Division I level, began in February 2013. The season progressed through the regular season, many conference tournaments and championship series, and concluded with the 2013 NCAA Division I softball tournament and 2013 Women's College World Series. The Women's College World Series, consisting of the eight remaining teams in the NCAA Tournament and held in Oklahoma City at ASA Hall of Fame Stadium, ended on June 6, 2013.

== Conference standings ==
2013 Big 12 Conference softball standings
| | Conf. | | | | Overall |
| Team | W | | L | PCT | W | | L | PCT |
|---|---|---|---|---|---|---|---|---|
| No. 1 Oklahoma ‍†‍‍^{y} | 15 | – | 2 | .882 | 57 | – | 4 | .934 |
| No. 3 Texas ‍‍‍^{y} | 14 | – | 4 | .778 | 51 | – | 10 | .836 |
| No. 20 Baylor ‍‍‍^{y} | 10 | – | 8 | .556 | 42 | – | 17 | .712 |
| Kansas ‍‍‍ | 9 | – | 8 | .529 | 34 | – | 16 | .680 |
| Oklahoma State ‍‍‍ | 6 | – | 12 | .333 | 30 | – | 26 | .536 |
| Texas Tech ‍‍‍ | 4 | – | 14 | .222 | 30 | – | 26 | .536 |
| Iowa State ‍‍‍ | 4 | – | 14 | .222 | 21 | – | 34 | .382 |
† – Conference champion y – Invited to the NCAA tournament Rankings from NFCA

2013 Big Ten Conference softball standings
| | Conf. | | | | Overall |
| Team | W | | L | PCT | W | | L | PCT |
|---|---|---|---|---|---|---|---|---|
| No. 6 Michigan ‍†‍‍^{y} | 20 | – | 2 | .909 | 51 | – | 13 | .797 |
| No. 8 Nebraska ‍‍‍^{y} | 16 | – | 6 | .727 | 45 | – | 16 | .738 |
| Minnesota ‍‍‍^{y} | 14 | – | 6 | .700 | 36 | – | 19 | .655 |
| Wisconsin ‍‍‡‍^{y} | 16 | – | 7 | .696 | 44 | – | 13 | .772 |
| Northwestern ‍‍‍ | 12 | – | 10 | .545 | 31 | – | 22 | .585 |
| Illinois ‍‍‍ | 11 | – | 12 | .478 | 22 | – | 27 | .449 |
| Michigan State ‍‍‍ | 9 | – | 10 | .474 | 24 | – | 25 | .490 |
| Ohio State ‍‍‍ | 10 | – | 13 | .435 | 34 | – | 22 | .607 |
| Iowa ‍‍‍ | 8 | – | 15 | .348 | 30 | – | 24 | .556 |
| Purdue ‍‍‍ | 8 | – | 15 | .348 | 23 | – | 32 | .418 |
| Penn State ‍‍‍ | 5 | – | 17 | .227 | 16 | – | 34 | .320 |
| Indiana ‍‍‍ | 3 | – | 19 | .136 | 19 | – | 35 | .352 |
† – Conference champion ‡ – Tournament champion y – Invited to the NCAA tournament As of June 2, 2013; Rankings from NFCA

2013 Southeastern Conference softball standings
| | Conf. | | | | Overall |
| Team | W | | L | PCT | W | | L | PCT |
|---|---|---|---|---|---|---|---|---|
Eastern
| No. 5 Florida ^{x}‍†‍‡‍^{y} | 18 | – | 6 | .750 | 58 | – | 9 | .866 |
| No. 2 Tennessee ‍‍‍^{y} | 16 | – | 6 | .727 | 52 | – | 12 | .813 |
| No. 11 Missouri ‍‍‍^{y} | 15 | – | 8 | .652 | 38 | – | 14 | .731 |
| Georgia ‍‍‍^{y} | 14 | – | 9 | .609 | 40 | – | 21 | .656 |
| No. 14 Kentucky ‍‍‍^{y} | 13 | – | 11 | .542 | 41 | – | 21 | .661 |
| South Carolina ‍‍‍^{y} | 8 | – | 16 | .333 | 34 | – | 25 | .576 |
Western
| No. 18 LSU ^{x}‍‍‍^{y} | 15 | – | 8 | .652 | 42 | – | 16 | .724 |
| Arkansas ‍‍‍^{y} | 12 | – | 10 | .545 | 36 | – | 20 | .643 |
| No. 10 Alabama ‍‍‍^{y} | 13 | – | 11 | .542 | 45 | – | 15 | .750 |
| No. 13 Texas A&M ‍‍‍^{y} | 10 | – | 13 | .435 | 42 | – | 18 | .700 |
| Mississippi State ‍‍‍^{y} | 8 | – | 16 | .333 | 32 | – | 24 | .571 |
| Auburn ‍‍‍ | 7 | – | 17 | .292 | 30 | – | 23 | .566 |
| Ole Miss ‍‍‍ | 3 | – | 21 | .125 | 25 | – | 31 | .446 |
x – Division champion † – Conference champion ‡ – Tournament champion y – Invited to the NCAA Tournament; As of June 30, 2013; Rankings from NFCA

2013 Southland Conference softball standings
| | Conf. | | | | | | Overall |
| Team | W | | L | | PCT | | W | L | | PCT |
|---|---|---|---|---|---|---|---|---|---|---|---|---|---|
| McNeese State ** ‍‍‍ | 19 | – | 5 | – | 0 | .792 | | 38 | – | 15 | – | 0 | .717 |
| Northwestern State ‡ ‍‍‍ | 18 | – | 7 | – | 0 | .720 | | 40 | – | 15 | – | 0 | .727 |
| Sam Houston ‍‍‍ | 17 | – | 10 | – | 0 | .630 | | 37 | – | 24 | – | 0 | .607 |
| Central Arkansas ‍‍‍ | 15 | – | 10 | – | 0 | .600 | | 38 | – | 20 | – | 0 | .655 |
| Lamar ‍‍‍ | 14 | – | 13 | – | 0 | .519 | | 24 | – | 35 | – | 0 | .407 |
| Southeastern Louisiana ‍‍‍ | 13 | – | 13 | – | 0 | .500 | | 32 | – | 22 | – | 0 | .593 |
| Nicholls ‍‍‍ | 12 | – | 13 | – | 0 | .480 | | 22 | – | 26 | – | 0 | .458 |
| Stephen F. Austin ‍‍‍ | 9 | – | 17 | – | 0 | .346 | | 16 | – | 32 | – | 0 | .333 |
| Houston Baptist ‍‍‍ | 6 | – | 20 | – | 0 | .231 | | 15 | – | 27 | – | 0 | .357 |
| Texas A&M–Corpus Christi ‍‍‍ | 6 | – | 21 | – | 0 | .222 | | 11 | – | 39 | – | 0 | .220 |
‡ – SLC Tournament Champion; **Southland Tournament #1 seed champion As of May 18, 2013; Rankings from USA Today/NFCA Coaches

2013 Sun Belt Conference softball standings
| | Conf. | | | | Overall |
| Team | W | | L | PCT | W | | L | PCT |
|---|---|---|---|---|---|---|---|---|
| RV Western Kentucky ‍†‍‍^{y} | 20 | – | 3 | .870 | 43 | – | 18 | .705 |
| No. 17 South Alabama ‍‍‡‍^{y} | 17 | – | 3 | .850 | 48 | – | 9 | .842 |
| No. 12 Louisiana–Lafayette ‍‍‍^{y} | 19 | – | 4 | .826 | 47 | – | 15 | .758 |
| North Texas ‍‍‍ | 12 | – | 9 | .571 | 29 | – | 24 | .547 |
| Florida Atlantic ‍‍‍ | 10 | – | 12 | .455 | 28 | – | 29 | .491 |
| FIU ‍‍‍ | 10 | – | 13 | .435 | 27 | – | 28 | .491 |
| Troy ‍‍‍ | 7 | – | 14 | .333 | 21 | – | 32 | .396 |
| Louisiana–Monroe ‍‍‍ | 3 | – | 20 | .130 | 19 | – | 35 | .352 |
| Middle Tennessee ‍‍‍ | 1 | – | 21 | .045 | 7 | – | 47 | .130 |
† – Conference champion ‡ – Tournament champion y – Invited to the NCAA tournament As of May 15, 2019; Rankings from

== Women's College World Series ==
The 2010 NCAA Women's College World Series took place from May 30 to June 4, 2013, in Oklahoma City.

First round
14 | Nebraska | 3^{(8)}
11 | Washington | 4
7 | Tennessee | 9
2 | Florida | 2
14 | Nebraska | 8^{(15)}
2 | Florida | 9
5 | Arizona State | 3
4 | Texas | 5
8 | Michigan | 1
1 | Oklahoma | 7
5 | Arizona State | 0
8 | Michigan | 2

Second round
11 | Washington | 0
7 | Tennessee | 1
2 | Florida | 0
4 | Texas | 3
4 | Texas | 2
1 | Oklahoma | 10
8 | Michigan | 1
11 | Washington | 4

Semifinals
7 | Tennessee | 2 | —
4 | Texas | 0 | —
1 | Oklahoma | 6 | —
11 | Washington | 2 | —

Finals
7 | Tennessee | 3^{(12)} | 0 | —
1 | Oklahoma | 5 | 4 | —

== Season leaders ==
Batting

- Batting average: .484 – Thomasina Garza, Texas Southern Tigers
- RBIs: 84 – Lauren Chamberlain, Oklahoma Sooners
- Home runs: 30 – Megan Baltzell, Longwood Lancers & Lauren Chamberlain, Oklahoma Sooners

Pitching

- Wins: 40-12 – Olivia Galati, Hofstra Pride
- ERA: 0.87 (17 ER/136.0 IP) – Michelle Gascoigne, Oklahoma Sooners
- Strikeouts: 422 – Blaire Luna, Texas Longhorns

== Records ==
Junior class single game home runs: 4 – Alexandria Anttila, Georgetown Hoyas; April 6, 2013

Sophomore class slugging percentage: 1.113% – Lauren Chamberlain, Oklahoma Sooners

Sophomore class runs: 87 – Lauren Chamberlain, Oklahoma Sooners

== Awards ==
- USA Softball Collegiate Player of the Year:

Keilani Ricketts, Oklahoma Sooners

- Honda Sports Award Collegiate Woman Athlete of the Year:

Keilani Ricketts, Oklahoma Sooners

- Honda Sports Award Softball:

Keilani Ricketts, Oklahoma Sooners

| YEAR | W | L | GP | GS | CG | SHO | SV | IP | H | R | ER | BB | SO | ERA | WHIP |
| 2013 | 35 | 1 | 45 | 40 | 27 | 16 | 2 | 238.1 | 123 | 47 | 42 | 63 | 350 | 1.23 | 0.78 |

| YEAR | G | AB | R | H | BA | RBI | HR | 3B | 2B | TB | SLG | BB | SO | SB | SBA |
| 2013 | 61 | 153 | 44 | 58 | .379 | 60 | 15 | 0 | 8 | 111 | .725% | 51 | 33 | 9 | 9 |

== All America Teams ==
The following players were members of the All-American Teams.

First Team

| Position | Player | Class | School |
|---|---|---|---|
| P | Keilani Ricketts | SR. | Oklahoma Sooners |
| P | Blaire Luna | SR. | Texas Longhorns |
| P | Hannah Rogers | JR. | Florida Gators |
| C | Amber Freeman | SO. | Arizona State Sun Devils |
| 1B | Lauren Chamberlain | SO. | Oklahoma Sooners |
| 2B | Lauren Gibson | SR. | Tennessee Lady Vols |
| 3B | Raven Chavanne | SR. | Tennessee Lady Vols |
| SS | Madison Shipman | JR. | Tennessee Lady Vols |
| OF | Janie Takeda | SO. | Oregon Ducks |
| OF | Kayla Braud | SR. | Alabama Crimson Tide |
| OF | Cassidy Bell | SR. | Penn State Nittany Lions |
| UT | Kaitlin Ingelsby | JR. | Washington Huskies |
| UT | Alexa Peterson | JR. | Oregon Ducks |
| AT-L | Lauren Haeger | SO. | Florida Gators |
| AT-L | Taylor Hoagland | SR. | Texas Longhorns |
| AT-L | Chelsea Thomas | SR. | Missouri Tigers |
| AT-L | Rachele Fico | SR. | LSU Tigers |
| AT-L | Jessica Moore | SR. | Oregon Ducks |

Second Team

| Position | Player | Class | School |
|---|---|---|---|
| P | Olivia Galati | SR. | Hofstra Pride |
| P | Dallas Escobedo | JR. | Arizona State Sun Devils |
| P | Jolene Henderson | SR. | California Golden Bears |
| C | Megan Baltzell | SO. | Longwood Lancers |
| 1B | Alicja Wolny | SR. | Louisville Cardinals |
| 2B | Katie Keller | JR. | Louisville Cardinals |
| 3B | Shelby Pendley | SO. | Oklahoma Sooners |
| SS | Cheyenne Coyle | JR. | Arizona State Sun Devils |
| OF | Haylie McCleney | FR. | Alabama Crimson Tide |
| OF | B.B. Bates | SR. | UCLA Bruins |
| OF | Brianna Turang | SR. | Oklahoma Sooners |
| UT | Tatum Edwards | JR. | Nebraska Cornhuskers |
| UT | Cali Lanphear | FR. | Texas A&M Aggies |
| AT-L | Sierra Romero | FR. | Michigan Wolverines |
| AT-L | Kaila Hunt | JR. | Alabama Crimson Tide |
| AT-L | Emilee Koerner | SO. | Notre Dame Fighting Irish |
| AT-L | Brianna Cherry | SR. | ULL Ragin' Cajuns |
| AT-L | Hannah Campbell | JR. | South Alabama Jaguars |

Third Team

| Position | Player | Class | School |
|---|---|---|---|
| P | Kaia Parnaby | SR. | Hawaii Rainbow Wahine |
| P | Aimee Creger | JR. | Tulsa Hurricanes |
| P | Lacey Waldrop | SO. | FSU Seminoles |
| C | Sarah Draheim | SR. | ULL Ragin' Cajuns |
| 1B | Geri Ann Glasco | FR. | Georgia Bulldogs |
| 2B | Kaylan Howard | SR. | Oregon Ducks |
| 3B | Kaitlyn Richardson | SO. | Minnesota Golden Gophers |
| SS | Taylor Thom | JR. | Texas Longhorns |
| OF | Tomeka Watson | SR. | Elon Phoenix |
| OF | Maggie Hull | SR. | Kansas Jayhawks |
| OF | A.J. Andrews | SO. | LSU Tigers |
| UT | Jaclyn Traina | JR. | Alabama Crimson Tide |
| UT | Brooke Short | SR. | Longwood Lancers |
| AT-L | Sara Nevins | JR. | USF Bulls |
| AT-L | Jennifer Gilbert | JR. | Ball State Cardinals |
| AT-L | Stephanie Pasquale | JR. | Temple Owls |
| AT-L | Ashley Lane | SR. | Michigan Wolverines |
| AT-L | Melissa Dumezich | SR. | Texas A&M Aggies |
