= 2013 SEC softball tournament =

2013 Southeastern Conference softball tournament
- Teams: 10
- Finals site: John Cropp Stadium; Lexington, KY
- Champions: Florida (3rd title)
- Runner-up: Missouri (1st title game)
- Winning coach: Tim Walton (3rd title)
- MVP: Kristi Merritt (Florida)
- Television: ESPNU; ESPN

2013 Southeastern Conference softball standings
| | Conf. | | | | Overall |
| Team | W | | L | PCT | W | | L | PCT |
|---|---|---|---|---|---|---|---|---|
Eastern
| No. 5 Florida ^{x}‍†‍‡‍^{y} | 18 | – | 6 | .750 | 58 | – | 9 | .866 |
| No. 2 Tennessee ‍‍‍^{y} | 16 | – | 6 | .727 | 52 | – | 12 | .813 |
| No. 11 Missouri ‍‍‍^{y} | 15 | – | 8 | .652 | 38 | – | 14 | .731 |
| Georgia ‍‍‍^{y} | 14 | – | 9 | .609 | 40 | – | 21 | .656 |
| No. 14 Kentucky ‍‍‍^{y} | 13 | – | 11 | .542 | 41 | – | 21 | .661 |
| South Carolina ‍‍‍^{y} | 8 | – | 16 | .333 | 34 | – | 25 | .576 |
Western
| No. 18 LSU ^{x}‍‍‍^{y} | 15 | – | 8 | .652 | 42 | – | 16 | .724 |
| Arkansas ‍‍‍^{y} | 12 | – | 10 | .545 | 36 | – | 20 | .643 |
| No. 10 Alabama ‍‍‍^{y} | 13 | – | 11 | .542 | 45 | – | 15 | .750 |
| No. 13 Texas A&M ‍‍‍^{y} | 10 | – | 13 | .435 | 42 | – | 18 | .700 |
| Mississippi State ‍‍‍^{y} | 8 | – | 16 | .333 | 32 | – | 24 | .571 |
| Auburn ‍‍‍ | 7 | – | 17 | .292 | 30 | – | 23 | .566 |
| Ole Miss ‍‍‍ | 3 | – | 21 | .125 | 25 | – | 31 | .446 |
x – Division champion † – Conference champion ‡ – Tournament champion y – Invited to the NCAA Tournament; As of June 30, 2013; Rankings from NFCA

The 2013 Southeastern Conference softball tournament was held on May 8 through the 11th at John Cropp Stadium in Lexington, Ky. The Florida Gators beat the Missouri Tigers 10–4 in their first win since 2009. Freshman center fielder Kirsti Merritt—the MVP (most valuable player) of Florida Gators—had two homers, seven RBI (Run batted in), four runs, a walk and two stolen bases.

== Tournament ==
1st Round; May 8th ESPNU
8 | Alabama | 10
9 | Texas A&M | 9
7 | Kentucky | 3
10 | South Carolina | 6

Quarterfinals; May 9th ESPNU
1 | Florida | 8
8 | Alabama | 4
4 | LSU | 0
5 | Georgia | 7
3 | Missouri | 8
6 | Arkansas | 0
2 | Tennessee | 5
10 | South Carolina | 0

Semifinals; May 10th ESPNU
1 | Florida | 9
5 | Georgia | 5
2 | Tennessee | 0
3 | Missouri | 3

Finals; May 11th ESPN
1 | Florida | 10
3 | Missouri | 4

- Auburn University, Ole Miss Rebels, and Mississippi State University did not make the tournament. Vanderbilt University does not sponsor a softball team.

Coaches of Each Team-

Alabama- Nick Saban

Texas A&M- Jo Evans

Kentucky- Rachel Lawson

South Carolina- Beverly Smith

Florida- Tim Walton

LSU- Beth Torina

Georgia-Lu Harris-Champer

Tennessee- Ralph Weekly

Missouri- Ehren Earleywine

Arkansas- Annie Smith
