= 2013 Tennessee Lady Volunteers softball team =

American college softball season

2013 Tennessee Lady Volunteers softball

NCAA Knoxville Regional champion NCAA Knoxville Super Regional champion

Women's College World Series, runner-up
- Conference: Southeastern Conference
- Record: 52–12 (16–6 SEC)
- Head coach: Karen Weekly and Ralph Weekly (12th season)
- Home stadium: Sherri Parker Lee Stadium

2013 Southeastern Conference softball standings
	Conf.				Overall
Team	W		L	PCT	W		L	PCT
Eastern
No. 5 Florida ^{x}‍†‍‡‍^{y}	18	–	6	.750	58	–	9	.866
No. 2 Tennessee ‍‍‍^{y}	16	–	6	.727	52	–	12	.813
No. 11 Missouri ‍‍‍^{y}	15	–	8	.652	38	–	14	.731
Georgia ‍‍‍^{y}	14	–	9	.609	40	–	21	.656
No. 14 Kentucky ‍‍‍^{y}	13	–	11	.542	41	–	21	.661
South Carolina ‍‍‍^{y}	8	–	16	.333	34	–	25	.576
Western
No. 18 LSU ^{x}‍‍‍^{y}	15	–	8	.652	42	–	16	.724
Arkansas ‍‍‍^{y}	12	–	10	.545	36	–	20	.643
No. 10 Alabama ‍‍‍^{y}	13	–	11	.542	45	–	15	.750
No. 13 Texas A&M ‍‍‍^{y}	10	–	13	.435	42	–	18	.700
Mississippi State ‍‍‍^{y}	8	–	16	.333	32	–	24	.571
Auburn ‍‍‍	7	–	17	.292	30	–	23	.566
Ole Miss ‍‍‍	3	–	21	.125	25	–	31	.446
x – Division champion † – Conference champion ‡ – Tournament champion y – Invited to the NCAA Tournament; As of June 30, 2013; Rankings from NFCA

The 2013 Tennessee Lady Volunteers softball team represented the University of Tennessee in the 2004 NCAA Division I softball season. The Lady Vols were coached by Karen Weekly and Ralph Weekly, who led their twelfth season. The Lady Vols finished with a record of 53–13.

The Lady Vols were invited to the 2013 NCAA Division I Softball Tournament, where they swept the NCAA Knoxville Regional and Super Regional and then completed a run to the title game of the Women's College World Series where they fell to champion Oklahoma.

== Personnel ==
=== Roster ===
2013 Tennessee Lady Volunteers roster
Pitchers: 13 - Ellen Renfroe - Junior; 20 - Ivy Renfroe - Senior; 22 - Erin Gabriel - Freshman; Catchers: 6 - Hannah Akamine - Sophomore; 19 - Lexi Overstreet - Freshman	Infielders: 1 - Hannah Trainer - Sophomore; 4 - Anna Renfroe - Freshman; 11 - Melissa Brown - Senior; 27 - Lauren Gibson - Senior; 44 - Madison Shipman - Junior; 77 - Cheyanne Tarango - Sophomore; 88 - Raven Chavanne - Senior	Outfielders: 2 - Jennifer Burroughs - Freshman; 7 - Tory Lewis - Junior; 15 - Melissa Davin - Junior; 21 - Haley Tobler - Freshman; 23 - Whitney Hammond - Senor; 33 - Kat Dotson - Senior; 42 - Rainey Gaffin - Freshman

=== Coaches ===
2013 Tennessee Lady Volunteers softball coaching staff
- Karen Weekly – Co-Head coach – 12th season
- Ralph Weekly – Co-Head coach – 12th season
- Marty McDaniel – Assistant coach – 9th season
- Marc Weekly – Assistant coach – 1st season

== Schedule ==
Legend
	Tennessee win
	Tennessee loss
*	Non-Conference game

2013 Tennessee Lady Volunteers softball game log
Regular season

February
Date	Opponent	Rank	Site/stadium	Score	Overall record	SEC record
Feb 7	vs Southern Utah*	No. 6	The Canyons Complex • St. George, UT (Red Desert Classic)	W 18–3^{5}	1–0	
Feb 8	vs Idaho State*	No. 6	The Canyons Complex • St. George, UT (Red Desert Classic)	W 14–2^{5}	2–0	
Feb 8	vs Utah State*	No. 6	The Canyons Complex • St. George, UT (Red Desert Classic)	W 10–0^{5}	3–0	
Feb 9	vs South Dakota*	No. 6	The Canyons Complex • St. George, UT (Red Desert Classic)	W 5–0	4–0	
Feb 9	vs BYU*	No. 6	The Canyons Complex • St. George, UT (Red Desert Classic)	W 6–3	5–0	
Feb 15	vs NC State*	No. 4	USF Softball Stadium • Tampa, FL (USF Softball Classic)	W 7–0	6–0	
Feb 15	vs Coastal Carolina*	No. 4	USF Softball Stadium • Tampa, FL (USF Softball Classic)	W 8–0^{6}	7–0	
Feb 16	at No. 12 South Florida*	No. 4	USF Softball Stadium • Tampa, FL (USF Softball Classic)	W 11–0	8–0	
Feb 16	vs Coastal Carolina*	No. 4	USF Softball Stadium • Tampa, FL (USF Softball Classic)	W 10–3	9–0	
Feb 17	vs NC State*	No. 4	USF Softball Stadium • Tampa, FL (USF Softball Classic)	W 8–2	10–0	
Feb 21	vs Long Beach State*	No. 4	Big League Dreams • Cathedral City, CA (Mary Nutter Collegiate Classic)	W 7–0	11–0	
Feb 21	vs Cal State Fullerton*	No. 4	Big League Dreams • Cathedral City, CA (Mary Nutter Collegiate Classic)	W 5–0	12–0	
Feb 22	vs Northwestern*	No. 4	Big League Dreams • Cathedral City, CA (Mary Nutter Collegiate Classic)	L 2–3	12–1	
Feb 22	vs No. 16 UCLA*	No. 4	Big League Dreams • Cathedral City, CA (Mary Nutter Collegiate Classic)	L 0–2	12–2	
Feb 23	vs UC Santa Barbara*	No. 4	Big League Dreams • Cathedral City, CA (Mary Nutter Collegiate Classic)	W 5–0	13–2	
Feb 26	Lipscomb*	No. 7	Sherri Parker Lee Stadium • Knoxville, TN	W 6–0	14–2	
Feb 28	at College of Charleston*	No. 7	CofC Softball Stadium at Patriots Point • Mount Pleasant, SC (Buccaneer Invitational)	L 1–3	14–3	

March
Date	Opponent	Rank	Site/stadium	Score	Overall record	SEC record
Mar 1	vs UNC Wilmington*	No. 7	CSU Softball Complex • North Charleston, SC (Buccaneer Invitational)	W 9–1^{5}	15–3	
Mar 1	at Charleston Southern*	No. 7	CSU Softball Complex • North Charleston, SC (Buccaneer Invitational)	W 8–1	16–3	
Mar 2	vs UNC Wilmington*	No. 7	CSU Softball Complex • North Charleston, SC (Buccaneer Invitational)	W 9–0^{5}	17–3	
Mar 2	vs Valparaiso*	No. 7	CSU Softball Complex • North Charleston, SC (Buccaneer Invitational)	W 5–0	18–3	
Mar 3	at Charleston Southern*	No. 7	CSU Softball Complex • North Charleston, SC (Buccaneer Invitational)	W 10–3	19–3	
Mar 8	No. 1 Alabama	No. 8	Sherri Parker Lee Stadium • Knoxville, TN	W 4–3	20–3	1–0
Mar 9	No. 1 Alabama	No. 8	Sherri Parker Lee Stadium • Knoxville, TN	W 2–1	21–3	2–0
Mar 10	No. 1 Alabama	No. 8	Sherri Parker Lee Stadium • Knoxville, TN	L 1–7	21–4	2–1
Mar 12	Winthrop*	No. 6	Sherri Parker Lee Stadium • Knoxville, TN	W 8–0^{5}	22–4	
Mar 15	at No. 3 Florida	No. 6	Katie Seashole Pressly Softball Stadium • Gainesville, FL	L 5–6^{8}	22–5	2–2
Mar 16	at No. 3 Florida	No. 6	Katie Seashole Pressly Softball Stadium • Gainesville, FL	W 3–1^{8}	23–5	3–2
Mar 17	at No. 3 Florida	No. 6	Katie Seashole Pressly Softball Stadium • Gainesville, FL	L 3–5^{8}	23–6	3–3
Mar 19	Murray State*	No. 8	Sherri Parker Lee Stadium • Knoxville, TN	W 7–0	24–6	
Mar 22	No. 5 Texas A&M	No. 8	Sherri Parker Lee Stadium • Knoxville, TN	W 8–6	25–6	4–3
Mar 23	No. 5 Texas A&M	No. 8	Sherri Parker Lee Stadium • Knoxville, TN	W 8–6	26–6	5–3
Mar 24	No. 5 Texas A&M	No. 8	Sherri Parker Lee Stadium • Knoxville, TN	W 5–4	27–6	6–3
Mar 27	Eastern Kentucky*	No. 6	Sherri Parker Lee Stadium • Knoxville, TN	W 8–0^{5}	28–6	
Mar 29	at No. 21 Kentucky	No. 6	John Cropp Stadium • Lexington, KY	W 6–0	29–6	7–3

April
Date	Opponent	Rank	Site/stadium	Score	Overall record	SEC record
Apr 1	Western Carolina*	No. 6	Sherri Parker Lee Stadium • Knoxville, TN	W 11–2^{5}	30–6	
Apr 2	Tennessee State*	No. 6	Sherri Parker Lee Stadium • Knoxville, TN	W 19–1^{5}	31–6	
Apr 5	at Georgia	No. 6	Jack Turner Stadium • Athens, GA	W 10–3	32–6	8–3
Apr 6	at Georgia	No. 6	Jack Turner Stadium • Athens, GA	W 9–2	33–6	9–3
Apr 7	at Georgia	No. 6	Jack Turner Stadium • Athens, GA	W 6–1	34–6	10–3
Apr 10	Tennessee Tech*	No. 5	Sherri Parker Lee Stadium • Knoxville, TN	W 12–3^{5}	35–6	
Apr 12	Auburn	No. 5	Sherri Parker Lee Stadium • Knoxville, TN	W 5–3	36–6	11–3
Apr 13	Auburn	No. 5	Sherri Parker Lee Stadium • Knoxville, TN	W 6–1	37–6	12–3
Apr 14	Auburn	No. 5	Sherri Parker Lee Stadium • Knoxville, TN	W 6–0	38–6	13–3
Apr 16	Appalachian State*	No. 5	Sherri Parker Lee Stadium • Knoxville, TN	W 9–0^{5}	39–6	
Apr 19	at Ole Miss	No. 5	Ole Miss Softball Complex • Oxford, MS	W 12–4^{5}	40–6	14–3
Apr 20	at Ole Miss	No. 5	Ole Miss Softball Complex • Oxford, MS	W 15–5^{5}	41–6	15–3
Apr 21	at Ole Miss	No. 5	Ole Miss Softball Complex • Oxford, MS	W 9–1^{5}	42–6	16–3
Apr 26	Arkansas	No. 3	Sherri Parker Lee Stadium • Knoxville, TN	L 1–2	42–7	16–4

May
Date	Opponent	Rank	Site/stadium	Score	Overall record	SEC record
May 4	at No. 11 Missouri	No. 4	Mizzou Softball Stadium • Columbia, MO	L 0–2	42–8	16–5
May 4	at No. 11 Missouri	No. 4	Mizzou Softball Stadium • Columbia, MO	W 10–1^{5}	43–8	17–5
May 5	at No. 11 Missouri	No. 4	Mizzou Softball Stadium • Columbia, MO	L 8–12^{6}	43–9	17–6

Postseason

SEC Tournament
Date	Opponent	Rank (Seed)	Site/stadium	Score	Overall record	SECT record
May 9	(10) South Carolina	No. 4 (2)	John Cropp Stadium • Lexington, KY	W 5–0	44–9	1–0
May 11	No. 8 (3) Missouri	No. 4 (2)	John Cropp Stadium • Lexington, KY	L 0–3	44–10	1–1

NCAA Knoxville Regional
Date	Opponent	Rank (Seed)	Site/stadium	Score	Overall record	Reg record
May 17	Longwood	No. 5 (7)	Sherri Parker Lee Stadium • Knoxville, TN	W 9–0^{5}	45–10	1–0
May 18	NC State	No. 5 (7)	Sherri Parker Lee Stadium • Knoxville, TN	W 1–0^{11}	46–10	2–0
May 19	NC State	No. 5 (7)	Sherri Parker Lee Stadium • Knoxville, TN	W 7–0	47–10	3–0

NCAA Knoxville Super Regional
Date	Opponent	Rank (Seed)	Site/stadium	Score	Overall record	SR record
May 24	No. 9 Alabama	No. 5 (7)	Sherri Parker Lee Stadium • Knoxville, TN	W 3–2	48–10	1–0
May 26	No. 9 Alabama	No. 5 (7)	Sherri Parker Lee Stadium • Knoxville, TN	W 5–3	49–10	2–0

NCAA Women's College World Series
Date	Opponent	Rank (Seed)	Site/stadium	Score	Overall record	WCWS Record
May 30	(2) Florida	No. 5 (7)	ASA Hall of Fame Stadium • Oklahoma City, OK	W 9–2	50–10	1–0
June 1	(11) Washington	No. 5 (7)	ASA Hall of Fame Stadium • Oklahoma City, OK	W 1–0	51–10	2–0
June 2	(4) Texas	No. 5 (7)	ASA Hall of Fame Stadium • Oklahoma City, OK	W 2–0	52–10	3–0
June 3	(1) Oklahoma	No. 5 (7)	ASA Hall of Fame Stadium • Oklahoma City, OK	L 3–5^{13}	52–11	3–1
June 4	(1) Oklahoma	No. 5 (7)	ASA Hall of Fame Stadium • Oklahoma City, OK	L 0–4	52–12	3–2
