= 2013 Alabama Crimson Tide softball team =

American college softball season

2013 Alabama Crimson Tide softball
- Conference: Southeastern Conference
- West
- Record: 35–6 (10–5 SEC)
- Head coach: Patrick Murphy
- Assistant coach: Alyson Habetz
- Pitching coach: Stephanie VanBrakle
- Home stadium: Rhoads Stadium

2013 Southeastern Conference softball standings
	Conf.				Overall
Team	W		L	PCT	W		L	PCT
Eastern
No. 5 Florida ^{x}‍†‍‡‍^{y}	18	–	6	.750	58	–	9	.866
No. 2 Tennessee ‍‍‍^{y}	16	–	6	.727	52	–	12	.813
No. 11 Missouri ‍‍‍^{y}	15	–	8	.652	38	–	14	.731
Georgia ‍‍‍^{y}	14	–	9	.609	40	–	21	.656
No. 14 Kentucky ‍‍‍^{y}	13	–	11	.542	41	–	21	.661
South Carolina ‍‍‍^{y}	8	–	16	.333	34	–	25	.576
Western
No. 18 LSU ^{x}‍‍‍^{y}	15	–	8	.652	42	–	16	.724
Arkansas ‍‍‍^{y}	12	–	10	.545	36	–	20	.643
No. 10 Alabama ‍‍‍^{y}	13	–	11	.542	45	–	15	.750
No. 13 Texas A&M ‍‍‍^{y}	10	–	13	.435	42	–	18	.700
Mississippi State ‍‍‍^{y}	8	–	16	.333	32	–	24	.571
Auburn ‍‍‍	7	–	17	.292	30	–	23	.566
Ole Miss ‍‍‍	3	–	21	.125	25	–	31	.446
x – Division champion † – Conference champion ‡ – Tournament champion y – Invited to the NCAA Tournament; As of June 30, 2013; Rankings from NFCA

The 2013 Alabama Crimson Tide softball team was an American softball team that represented the University of Alabama for the 2013 NCAA softball season. The Crimson Tide played its home games at Rhoads Stadium. After winning the 2012 National Championship, the 2013 team looked to make the postseason for the 15th straight year, and the Women's College World Series for ninth time. This season represented the 17th season of softball in the school's history.

== 2013 Roster ==
2013 Alabama Crimson Tide roster
Pitchers: 11 Lauren Sewell – Redshirt Junior; 23 Leslie Jury – Sophomore; 33 Jackie Traina – Junior; Outfielders: 1 Kayla Braud – Senior; 3 Keima Davis – Senior; 8 Haylie McCleney – Freshman; 18 Andrea Hawkins – Freshman; Utility: 12 Kallie Case – Freshman; 17 Jadyn Spencer – Sophomore; 24 Leona Lafaele – Freshman	Catchers: 6 Jordan Patterson – Junior; 21 Chaunsey Bell – Sophomore; 22 Molly Fichtner – Junior; Infielders: 4 Jackey Branham – Senior; 9 Courtney Conley – Senior; 10 Kaila Hunt – Junior; 15 Danae Hays – Sophomore; 19 Danielle Richard – Sophomore; 32 Ryan Iamurri – Junior; 13 Kylie Sanders - "Freshman"

2013 Alabama Crimson Tide Softball Roster

== Schedule ==
Date	Time	Opponent	Rank^{#}	Site	Result	Attendance	Winning Pitcher	Losing Pitcher
UNI-Dome Tournament
February 8*	3:00 PM	Illinois Fighting Illini	#1	UNI-Dome • Cedar Falls, IA	W 7–2	525	L. Jury	P. Gay
February 8*	7:00 PM	Northern Iowa Panthers	#1	UNI-Dome • Cedar Falls, IA	W 8–1	5,084	J. Traina	J. Fisher
February 9*	3:00 PM	Drake Bulldogs	#1	UNI-Dome • Cedar Falls, IA	W 8–2	550	L. Sewell	L. Schmidt
February 9*	7:00 PM	Green Bay Phoenix	#1	UNI-Dome • Cedar Falls, IA	W 10–7	268	J. Traina	L. Goecks
February 10*	10:00 AM	North Dakota State Bison	#1	UNI-Dome • Cedar Falls, IA	W 10–0^{5}	268	J. Traina	L. Johnson
February 12*	3:00 PM	South Alabama Jaguars	#1	Rhoads Stadium • Tuscaloosa, AL	Canceled	–	–	–
La Quinta Inn at the Airport Tournament
February 15*	3:00 PM	Appalachian State Mountaineers	#1	FGCU Softball Complex • Fort Myers, FL	W 9–3	316	L. Sewell	S. Landeros
February 15*	9:00 PM	FGCU Eagles	#1	FGCU Softball Complex • Fort Myers, FL	W 2–1	1,109	J. Traina	S. Morgan
February 16*	10:15 AM	Wichita State Shockers	#1	FGCU Softball Complex • Fort Myers, FL	W 2–0	327	L. Jury	K. Armaost
February 16*	2:45 PM	Georgia Southern Eagles	#1	FGCU Softball Complex • Fort Myers, FL	W 2–1^{9}	456	J. Traina	S. Purvis
February 17*	8:00 AM	Southern Illinois Salukis	#1	FGCU Softball Complex • Fort Myers, FL	W 10–1^{5}	160	L. Jury	B. Lang
February 19*	6:00 PM	UAB Blazers	#1	UAB Softball Field • Birmingham, AL	W 8–4	1,204	J. Traina	L. Streetman
Easton Bama Bash Presented by DRASH
February 22*	4:00 PM	Western Illinois Leathernecks	#1	Rhoads Stadium • Tuscaloosa, AL	W 21–0^{5}	–	L. Jury	K. Hart
February 22*	6:30 PM	Iowa Hawkeyes	#1	Rhoads Stadium • Tuscaloosa, AL	W 5–0	2,652	J. Traina	K. Massey
February 23*	1:30 PM	Iowa Hawkeyes	#1	Rhoads Stadium • Tuscaloosa, AL	W 4–1	–	J. Traina	K. Massey
February 23*	4:00 PM	Western Illinois Leathernecks	#1	Rhoads Stadium • Tuscaloosa, AL	W 6–0	3,225	L. Jury	K. Michelini
February 24*	1:30 PM	Winthrop Eagles	#1	Rhoads Stadium • Tuscaloosa, AL	W 6–1	2,701	L. Sewell	S. Watson
February 27*	6:00 PM	Samford Bulldogs	#1	Rhoads Stadium • Tuscaloosa, AL	W 11–0^{5}	2,602	L. Jury	M. Hanson
February 28*	6:00 PM	South Alabama Jaguars	#1	Rhoads Stadium • Tuscaloosa, AL	W 4–0	2,531	J. Traina	H. Campbell
Easton Classic
March 1*	2:45 PM	Iowa State Cyclones	#1	Rhoads Stadium • Tuscaloosa, AL	W 13–4^{6}	–	L. Jury	R. Fisher
March 1*	6:30 PM	St. John's Red Storm	#1	Rhoads Stadium • Tuscaloosa, AL	W 9–1^{5}	2,669	L. Sewell	A. Beza
March 2*	1:30 PM	St. John's Red Storm	#1	Rhoads Stadium • Tuscaloosa, AL	W 12–4^{6}	–	L. Sewell	T. Free
March 2*	4:00 PM	Iowa State Cyclones	#1	Rhoads Stadium • Tuscaloosa, AL	W 6–0	2,692	J. Traina	L. Smith
March 6*	6:00 PM	#4 Florida Gators	#1	Rhoads Stadium • Tuscaloosa, AL	L 4–8	2,860	H. Rogers	J. Traina
March 8	5:30 PM	#8 Tennessee Volunteers	#1	Sherri Lee Stadium • Knoxville, TN	L 3–4	1,689	I. Renfroe	J. Traina
March 9	1:30 PM	#8 Tennessee Volunteers	#1	Sherri Lee Stadium • Knoxville, TN	L 1–2	1,723	I. Renfroe	L. Jury
March 10	12:30 PM	#8 Tennessee Volunteers	#1	Sherri Lee Stadium • Knoxville, TN	W 7–1	1,741	J. Traina	E. Gabriel
March 15	6:00 PM	South Carolina Gamecocks	#4	Beckham Field • Columbia, SC	W 6–4	830	L. Jury	K. Marks
March 16	11:00 AM	South Carolina Gamecocks	#4	Beckham Field • Columbia, SC	W 5–3	830	L. Jury	K. Marks
March 17	12:00 PM	South Carolina Gamecocks	#4	Beckham Field • Columbia, SC	W 7–6	830	J. Traina	A. Broyels
March 20*	6:00 PM	Georgia State Panthers	#4	Rhoads Stadium • Tuscaloosa, AL	W 9–1^{5}	2,577	L. Sewell	K. Worley
March 22	6:30 PM	Auburn Tigers	#4	Rhoads Stadium • Tuscaloosa, AL	W 8–0^{6}	2,664	J. Traina	L. Davis
March 23	2:00 PM	Auburn Tigers	#4	Rhoads Stadium • Tuscaloosa, AL	L 4–7	3,925	M. Harper	L. Jury
March 24	1:00 PM	Auburn Tigers	#4	Rhoads Stadium • Tuscaloosa, AL	W 13–1^{5}	3,940	J. Traina	L. Davis
March 27*	6:00 PM	Houston Cougars	#4	Cougar Softball Stadium • Houston, TX	W 6–3	1,793	L. Jury	L. Watts
March 29	7:00 PM	#9 Texas A&M Aggies	#4	Aggie Softball Complex • College Station, TX	L 3–2	1,927	M. Dumezich	J. Traina
March 30	4:00 PM	#9 Texas A&M Aggies	#4	Aggie Softball Complex • College Station, TX	W 6–2	1,947	L. Jury	M. Dumezich
March 31	12:00 PM	#9 Texas A&M Aggies	#4	Aggie Softball Complex • College Station, TX	W 4–1	1,530	J. Traina	M. Dumezich
April 2*	6:00 PM	Jacksonville State Gamecocks	#4	Rhoads Stadium • Tuscaloosa, AL	W 11–3^{5}	2,594	L. Sewell	T. Harbin
April 5	8:00 PM	#7 Missouri Tigers	#4	Rhoads Stadium • Tuscaloosa, AL	W 4–1	3,032	J. Traina	C. Thomas
April 6	2:00 PM	#7 Missouri Tigers	#4	Rhoads Stadium • Tuscaloosa, AL	L 4–9	3,486	C. Thomas	L. Jury
April 7	11:30 AM	#7 Missouri Tigers	#4	Rhoads Stadium • Tuscaloosa, AL	W 14–6^{6}	2,973	J. Traina	C. Thomas
April 9*	6:00 PM	MVST Delta Devils	#4	Rhoads Stadium • Tuscaloosa, AL	W 8–5	2,441	L. Jury	A. Lorenz
April 10*	6:00 PM	UAB Blazers	#4	Rhoads Stadium • Tuscaloosa, AL	W 11–0^{6}	2,873	L. Jury	L. Webster
April 16*	6:00 PM	Southern Miss Golden Eagles	#4	Rhoads Stadium • Tuscaloosa, AL	W 11–0^{5}	2,493	L. Sewell	B. Dietrich
April 19	6:30 PM	Mississippi State Bulldogs	#4	Rhoads Stadium • Tuscaloosa, AL	L 2–3	3,518	S. Becker	J. Traina
April 20	4:30 PM	Mississippi State Bulldogs	#4	Rhoads Stadium • Tuscaloosa, AL	W 11–3^{5}	4,002	L. Jury	A. Owen
April 21	1:07 PM	Mississippi State Bulldogs	#4	Rhoads Stadium • Tuscaloosa, AL	W 9–8	3,814	L. Jury	A. Owen
April 25	7:05 PM	#12 LSU Lady Tigers	#4	Tiger Park • Baton Rouge, LA	L 2–3^{8}	1,917	R. Fico	J. Traina
April 26	6:07 PM	#12 LSU Lady Tigers	#4	Tiger Park • Baton Rouge, LA	L 1–2	2,651	A. Czechner	L. Jury
April 27	1:09 PM	#12 LSU Lady Tigers	#4	Tiger Park • Baton Rouge, LA	L 3–4	3,231	R. Fico	J. Traina
May 4	12:03 PM	#20 Kentucky Wildcats	#7	Rhoads Stadium • Tuscaloosa, AL	L 0–5	3,067	K. Nunley	L. Jury
May 4	2:30 PM	#20 Kentucky Wildcats	#7	Rhoads Stadium • Tuscaloosa, AL	W 14–0^{5}	3,605	J. Traina	L. Cumbess
May 5	1:33 PM	#20 Kentucky Wildcats	#7	Rhoads Stadium • Tuscaloosa, AL	L 5–9^{8}	3,402	K. Nunley	L. Jury
SEC Tournament
May 8	7:20 PM	#14 Texas A&M Aggies	#9	John Cropp Stadium • Lexington, KY	W 10–9	1,871	L. Jury	M. Dumezich
May 9	11:05 AM	#2 Florida Gators	#9	John Cropp Stadium • Lexington, KY	L 4–8	–	L. Haeger	L. Jury
NCAA Tuscaloosa Regional
May 17*	8:00 PM	Jacksonville State Gamecocks	#9	Rhoads Stadium • Tuscaloosa, AL	W 5–0	1,917	L. Jury	T. Harbin
May 18*	1:00 PM	Western Kentucky Hilltoppers	#9	Rhoads Stadium • Tuscaloosa, AL	W 7–6	1,976	L. Jury	E. Rousseau
May 19*	1:00 PM	Western Kentucky Hilltoppers	#9	Rhoads Stadium • Tuscaloosa, AL	W 13–1^{5}	1,863	J. Traina	M. Sulaski
NCAA Knoxville Super Regional
May 24*	7:00 PM	#4 Tennessee Volunteers	#9	Lee Stadium • Knoxville, TN	L 3–2	1,650	E. Renfroe	J. Traina
May 25*	5:00 PM	#4 Tennessee Volunteers	#9	Lee Stadium • Knoxville, TN	L 5–3	1,650	I. Renfroe	J. Traina
*Non-Conference Game. ^{#}Rankings from NFCA released prior to game.All times are in Central Time Zone.

== Ranking movement ==
Poll	Pre	Wk 1	Wk 2	Wk 3	Wk 4	Wk 5	Wk 6	Wk 7	Wk 8	Wk 9	Wk 10	Wk 11	Wk 12	Wk 13	Final
NFCA	1	1	1	1	1	4	4	4	4	4	4	4	7	9	
USA Softball	1	2	2	2	6	6	7	7	5	6	6	8	10	10	

== Awards and honors ==
Kayla Braud

SEC Preseason Team
USA Softball Collegiate Player of the Year Watch List
Senior CLASS Award Candidate

Molly Fichtner

SEC Player of the Week; April 8

Kaila Hunt

SEC Preseason Team
USA Softball Collegiate Player of the Year Watch List

Haylie McCleney

SEC Freshman of the Week; February 11, February 25

Jackie Traina

SEC Preseason Team
USA Softball Collegiate Player of the Year Watch List

== See also ==
- 2013 Alabama Crimson Tide baseball team
