= Beverly Smith (disambiguation) =

Beverly Smith (born 1946) is an American writer and academic.

Beverley Smith may also refer to:

- Bev Smith (born 1960), Canadian basketball player and coach
- Bevy Smith (born 1966), American television personality and business woman
- Beverly Smith (softball), American softball coach
- J. Beverley Smith (1931–2024), British historian of medieval Wales
