= 2015 Conference USA softball tournament =

The 2015 Conference USA (C-USA) softball tournament was held at Felsberg Field at FIU Softball Field in Miami, Florida, from May 7 through May 9, 2015. The tournament winner will earn the Conference USA automatic bid to the 2015 NCAA Division I softball tournament. All games will be televised. The quarterfinals and semifinals will be shown on the C-USA Digital Network while the championship will be broadcast on CBS Sports Network. Ben Holden and Tammy Blackburn will call the championship.

== Tournament ==
Quarterfinals
1	Western Kentucky	1
8	Charlotte	0
4	UAB	3
5	Marshall	1
2	FAU	5
7	North Texas	0
3	UTSA	4
6	Louisiana Tech	1

Semifinals
1	Western Kentucky	3
4	UAB	1
2	FAU	6
3	UTSA	4

Finals
1	Western Kentucky	3
2	FAU	1

- All times listed are Eastern Daylight Time.
