= Beverly Smith (softball) =

American softball coach

Biographical details
- Born: Asheboro, North Carolina, U.S.
- Education: North Carolina

Playing career
- 1991–1994: North Carolina

Coaching career (HC unless noted)
- 1996–1998: Episcopal HS
- 1998–2002: North Carolina (asst.)
- 2004: North Carolina (asst.)
- 2005–2008: North Carolina (asst. HC)
- 2008–2010: North Carolina (AHC)
- 2011–2024: South Carolina

Head coaching record
- Overall: 461–323 (.588)

Beverly Smith is an American softball coach who most recently served as the head coach at South Carolina.

== Coaching career ==
=== South Carolina ===
On July 15, 2010, Smith was named the head coach of the South Carolina softball program, replacing longtime head coach Joyce Compton. On June 8, 2024, Smith was fired as the head coach. She finished her tenure at South Carolina with a 461–323 overall record.

== Head coaching record ==
=== College ===
Record table
Season	Team	Overall	Conference	Standing	Postseason
South Carolina Gamecocks (Southeastern Conference) (2011–2024)
2011	South Carolina	26–30	6–22	5th (East)	
2012	South Carolina	23–32	3–25	5th (East)	
2013	South Carolina	34–25	8–16	5th (East)	Austin Regional
2014	South Carolina	36–22	11–13	8th	Tallahassee Regional
2015	South Carolina	38–22	10–14	9th	Tallahassee Regional
2016	South Carolina	38–23	7–17	11th	Tallahassee Regional
2017	South Carolina	34–25	8–15	10th	Tucson Regional
2018	South Carolina	49–17	15–9	3rd	Tempe Super Regional
2019	South Carolina	38–19	9–14	11th	Tallahassee Regional
2020	South Carolina	17–6	1–2		Season canceled due to COVID-19
2021	South Carolina	26–26	4–20	13th	
2022	South Carolina	26–30	3–21	13th	
2023	South Carolina	40–22	9–15	10th	Tallahassee Regional
2024	South Carolina	36–24	8–16	T–11th	Durham Regional
South Carolina:		461–323 (.588)	102–219 (.318)		
Total:		461–323 (.588)			
National champion Postseason invitational champion Conference regular season champion Conference regular season and conference tournament champion Division regular season champion Division regular season and conference tournament champion Conference tournament champion
