= 2013 Louisiana–Lafayette Ragin' Cajuns softball team =

American college softball season

2013 Louisiana–Lafayette Ragin' Cajuns softball

Ann Arbor Super Regionals appearance Baton Rouge Regionals champions

Hilton House Plaza Classic Champions Louisiana Classic Champions NFCA Leadoff Classic Champions
- Conference: Sun Belt Conference

Ranking
- Coaches: No. 12
- Record: 47-15 (19-4 SBC)
- Head coach: Michael Lotief (13th Season); Megan Granger (Interim, February)
- Assistant coach: T. J. Hubbard
- Home stadium: Lamson Park

2013 Sun Belt Conference softball standings
	Conf.				Overall
Team	W		L	PCT	W		L	PCT
RV Western Kentucky ‍†‍‍^{y}	20	–	3	.870	43	–	18	.705
No. 17 South Alabama ‍‍‡‍^{y}	17	–	3	.850	48	–	9	.842
No. 12 Louisiana–Lafayette ‍‍‍^{y}	19	–	4	.826	47	–	15	.758
North Texas ‍‍‍	12	–	9	.571	29	–	24	.547
Florida Atlantic ‍‍‍	10	–	12	.455	28	–	29	.491
FIU ‍‍‍	10	–	13	.435	27	–	28	.491
Troy ‍‍‍	7	–	14	.333	21	–	32	.396
Louisiana–Monroe ‍‍‍	3	–	20	.130	19	–	35	.352
Middle Tennessee ‍‍‍	1	–	21	.045	7	–	47	.130
† – Conference champion ‡ – Tournament champion y – Invited to the NCAA tournament As of May 15, 2019; Rankings from

The 2013 Louisiana–Lafayette Ragin' Cajuns softball team represented the University of Louisiana at Lafayette in the 2013 NCAA Division I softball season. The Ragin' Cajuns played their home games at Lamson Park and were led by thirteenth year head coach Michael Lotief and, for a short time while Lotief underwent family issues, former Cajun player Megan Granger served as interim head coach for the month of February.

== Preseason ==
=== Sun Belt Conference Coaches Poll ===
The Sun Belt Conference Coaches Poll was released on February 4, 2013. Louisiana–Lafayette was picked to finish first in the Sun Belt Conference with 81 votes and 9 first place votes, all first place votes available.

Coaches poll
Predicted finish	Team	Votes (1st place)
1	Louisiana–Lafayette	81 (9)
2	South Alabama	71
3	FIU	52
4	Troy	49
5	North Texas	48
6	Western Kentucky	43
7	Florida Atlantic	25
8	Louisiana-Monroe	24
9	Middle Tennessee	12

=== Preseason All-Sun Belt team ===
- Jordan Wallace (ULL, SO, Pitcher)
- Hannah Campbell (USA, JR, Pitcher)
- Sarah Draheim (ULL, SR, Catcher)
- Matte Haack (ULL, SR, 1st Base)
- Kayla Toney (MTSU, JR, 2nd Base)
- Nerissa Myers (ULL, SR, Shortstop)
- Natalie Fernandez (ULL, JR, 3rd Base)
- Jessy Alfonso (FIU, SR, Outfield)
- Brianna Cherry (ULL, SR, Outfield)
- Blair Johnson (USA, SO, Outfield)
- Kelsie Mattox (WKU, JR, Outfield)
- Taylor Fawbush (FAU, SR, Utility/Designated Player)
- Kayla Burri (FIU, SR, At-Large)
- Brie Rojas (FIU, SR, At-Large)
- Britney Campbell (USA, SR, At-Large)
- Hannah Renn (TROY, SR, At-Large)
- Karavin Dew (WKU, SR, At-Large)

==== Sun Belt Preseason Pitcher of the Year ====
- Nerissa Myers (ULL)

==== Sun Belt Preseason Player of the Year ====
- Jordan Wallace (ULL)

== Roster ==
2013 Louisiana–Lafayette Ragin' Cajuns roster
Pitchers: 7 Jordan Wallace - Sophomore; 10 Kristin Martinez - Junior; 16 Christina Hamilton - Redshirt Sophomore; 32 Victoria Brown - Freshman; Catchers: 00 Shyanne McDowell - Freshman; 9 Linzey Cifreo - Redshirt Freshman; 24 Sarah Draheim - Senior; Utility Players: 3 Natalie Fernandez - Junior; 5 Megan Thomas - Redshirt Freshman; 13 Marie Hoag - Redshirt Freshman; 21 Samantha Walsh - Redshirt Freshman; 22 Shellie Landry - Freshman; 25 Sara Corbello - Freshman	Infielders: 6 Taylor Meaux - Redshirt Freshman; 12 Gabby Felps - Freshman; 15 Nerissa Myers - Senior; 27 Matte Haack - Senior; 28 Kelsey Vincent - Freshman; 31 Corin Voinché - Redshirt Freshman; Outfielders: 8 Megan Waterman - Senior; 14 Cassidy White - Freshman; 17 Leandra Maly - Sophomore; 19 Shelbi Redfearn - Junior; 23 Brianna Cherry - Senior

=== Coaching staff ===
2013 Louisiana–Lafayette Ragin' Cajuns coaching staff
- Michael Lotief – Head coach (Volunteer Assistant - February) – 13th year
- T. J. Hubbard – Associate head coach – 1st year
- Joshua Johnson - Assistant Coach - 1st year
- Megan Granger - Assistant Coach (Interim Head Coach - February) - 1st year
- Katie Smith – Director of Operations - 1st year
- Stefni Lotief - Volunteer Assistant Coach - 1st year

== Schedule and results ==
Legend
	Louisiana–Lafayette win
	Louisiana–Lafayette loss
	Postponement/Cancellation
**Bold**	Louisiana team member

2013 Louisiana–Lafayette Ragin' Cajuns softball game log
Regular season (40-11)

February (13-2)
Date	Opponent	Rank	Site/stadium	Score	Win	Loss	Save	TV	Attendance	Overall record	SBC record
Hilton House Plaza Classic)
Feb. 9	vs. Lipscomb	No. 11	Cougar Softball Stadium • Houston, TX	**W** 5-2	**Wallace** (1-0)	Anderson (0-0)	**Brown** (1)		442	1-0	
Feb. 9	vs. Iowa	No. 11	Cougar Softball Stadium • Houston, TX	**L** 10-13	Whitney (1-0)	**Martinez** (0-1)	None		442	1-1	
Feb. 10	vs. Iowa	No. 11	Cougar Softball Stadium • Houston, TX	**W** 11-0 (5 inn)	**Wallace** (2-0)	Massey (1-2)	None		278	2-1	
Feb. 13	Mississippi State	No. 15	Lamson Park • Lafayette, LA	**W** 9-1 (6 inn)	**Wallace** (3-0)	Vry (0-1)	None		837	3-1	
Louisiana Classics
Feb. 15	vs. Mississippi Valley State	No. 15	Lamson Park • Lafayette, LA	**W** 13-2 (5 inn)	**Brown** (1-0)	Spivey (1-2)	None		997	4-1	
Feb. 16	vs. Texas State	No. 15	Lamson Park • Lafayette, LA	**W** 9-1 (6 inn)	**Wallace** (4-0)	Taylor (0-3)	None			5-1	
Feb. 16	vs. Mississippi Valley State	No. 15	Lamson Park • Lafayette, LA	**W** 16-4 (5 inn)	**Martinez** (1-1)	Lorenz (0-3)	None		665	6-1	
Feb. 17	vs. Texas State	No. 15	Lamson Park • Lafayette, LA	**W** 3-2	**Wallace** (5-0)	House (0-2)	None		902	7-1	
Feb. 20	at McNeese State	No. 12	Joe Miller Field at Cowgirl Diamond • Lake Charles, LA	**W** 5-1	**Wallace** (6-0)	Lilly (1-2)	None		337	8-1	
NFCA Leadoff Classic
Feb. 22	vs. No. 15 Michigan	No. 12	Eddie C. Moore Complex • Clearwater, FL	**L** 1-3	Driesenga (6-1)	**Wallace** (6-1)	None		120	8-2	
Feb. 22	vs. No. 14 South Florida	No. 12	Eddie C. Moore Complex • Clearwater, FL	**W** 3-0	**Hamilton** (1-0)	Richardson (3-2)	None		147	9-2	
Feb. 23	vs. Illinois State	No. 12	Eddie C. Moore Complex • Clearwater, FL	**W** 8-5	**Wallace** (7-1)	Rodriguez (1-1)	None		133	10-2	
Feb. 23	vs. Hofstra	No. 12	Eddie C. Moore Complex • Clearwater, FL	**W** 4-2	**Brown** (2-0)	Galati (3-4)	**Martinez** (1)		119	11-2	
Feb. 24	vs. James Madison	No. 12	Eddie C. Moore Complex • Clearwater, FL	**W** 9-1 (6 inn)	**Wallace** (8-1)	Kiefer (2-1)	None		100	12-2	
Feb. 26	Southern	No. 13	Lamson Park • Lafayette, LA	**W** 9-1 (5 inn)	**Brown** (3-0)	Stevenson (0-4)	None		304	13-2	

March (9-9)
Date	Opponent	Rank	Site/stadium	Score	Win	Loss	Save	TV	Attendance	Overall record	SBC record
Diamond 9 Citrus Classic
Mar. 1	vs. Pittsburgh	No. 13	ESPN Wide World of Sports Complex • Bay Lake, FL	**W** 8-0 (6 inn)	**Hamilton** (2-0)	King (3-4)	None		104	14-2	
Mar. 1	vs. No. 5 Texas A&M	No. 13	ESPN Wide World of Sports Complex • Bay Lake, FL	**L** 4-6	Dumezich (13-0)	**Wallace** (8-2)	None		233	14-3	
Mar. 2	vs. Texas	No. 13	ESPN Wide World of Sports Complex • Bay Lake, FL	**L** 2-7	Luna (9-0)	**Hamilton** (2-1)	None		121	14-4	
Mar. 2	College of Charleston	No. 13	ESPN Wide World of Sports Complex • Bay Lake, FL	**W** 16-0 (5 inn)	**Martinez** (2-1)	Saylors (3-2)	None		245	15-4	
Mar. 3	Illinois State	No. 13	ESPN Wide World of Sports Complex • Bay Lake, FL	**L** 3-4	Baxter (6-3)	**Wallace** (8-3)	None		262	15-5	
Mar. 6	at No. 10 Texas	No. 15	Red and Charline McCombs Field • Austin, TX	**L** 4-9	Luna (10-0)	**Martinez** (2-2)	None		778	15-6	
Mar. 6	at No. 10 Texas	No. 15	Red and Charline McCombs Field • Austin, TX	**L** 1-7	Bruins (6-0)	**Wallace** (8-4)	None		778	15-7	
Mar. 9	Western Kentucky	No. 15	Lamson Park • Lafayette, LA	**W** 10-0 (5 inn)	**Wallace** (9-4)	Sulaski (2-3)	None			16-7	1-0
Mar. 9	Western Kentucky	No. 15	Lamson Park • Lafayette, LA	**L** 2-12	Rousseau (5-2)	**Martinez** (2-3)	None		619	16-8	1-1
Mar. 10	Western Kentucky	No. 15	Lamson Park • Lafayette, LA	**L** 2-3	Rousseau (6-2)	**Wallace** (9-5)	None		988	16-9	1-2
Mar. 13	Louisiana Tech	No. 22	Lamson Park • Lafayette, LA	**W** 4-1	**Wallace** (10-5)	Jones (8-6)	None		729	17-9	
Mar. 13	Louisiana Tech	No. 22	Lamson Park • Lafayette, LA	**W** 9-1 (5 inn)	**Brown** (4-0)	Jones (8-7)	None		729	18-9	
Mar. 16	at South Alabama	No. 22	Jaguar Field • Mobile, AL	**L** 3-7	Campbell (10-4)	**Wallace** (10-6)	None		326	18-10	1-3
Mar. 16	at South Alabama	No. 22	Jaguar Field • Mobile, AL	**L** 4-8	Beard (10-0)	**Brown** (4-1)	None		369	18-11	1-4
Mar. 17	at South Alabama	No. 22	Jaguar Field • Mobile, AL	**W** 2-1	**Wallace** (11-6)	Campbell (10-5)	None		423	19-11	2-4
Mar. 29	FIU		Lamson Park • Lafayette, LA	**W** 10-2 (6 inn)	**Wallace** (12-6)	Jenkins (11-4)	None		880	20-11	3-4
Mar. 29	FIU		Lamson Park • Lafayette, LA	**W** 9-5	**Brown** (5-1)	Dawson (4-11)	None		880	21-11	4-4
Mar. 30	FIU		Lamson Park • Lafayette, LA	**W** 7-5	**Wallace** (13-6)	Jenkins (11-4)	None		750	22-11	5-4

April (16-0)
Date	Opponent	Rank	Site/stadium	Score	Win	Loss	Save	TV	Attendance	Overall record	SBC record
Apr. 6	at North Texas		Lovelace Softball Stadium • Denton, TX	**W** 10-0 (5 inn)	**Wallace** (14-6)	Simmons (6-5)	None		350	23-11	6-4
Apr. 6	at North Texas		Lovelace Softball Stadium • Denton, TX	**W** 8-2	**Brown** (6-1)	Kirk (8-6)	**Wallace** (1)		350	24-11	7-4
Apr. 7	at North Texas		Lovelace Softball Complex • Denton, TX	**W** 5-0	**Wallace** (15-6)	Simmons (6-6)	None		250	25-11	8-4
Apr. 10	Southern Miss		Lamson Park • Lafayette, LA	**W** 18-2 (5 inn)	**Wallace** (16-6)	Wilson (4-11)	None		638	26-11	
Apr. 10	Southern Miss		Lamson Park • Lafayette, LA	**W** 10-0 (5 inn)	**Brown** (7-1)	Dietrich (1-11)	None		638	27-11	
Apr. 13	Middle Tennessee		Lamson Park • Lafayette, LA	**W** 10-0 (5 inn)	**Wallace** (17-6)	McClure (2-12)	None		886	28-11	9-4
Apr. 13	Middle Tennessee		Lamson Park • Lafayette, LA	**W** 6-3	**Wallace** (18-6)	Fisherback (3-17)	None		886	29-11	10-4
Apr. 14	Middle Tennessee		Lamson Park • Lafayette, LA	**W** 6-0	**Wallace** (19-6)	Stinnett (0-7)	None		632	30-11	11-4
Apr. 17	Houston	No. 25	Lamson Park • Lafayette, LA	**W** 9-1 (5 inn)	**Wallace** (20-6)	Outon (7-5)	None		835	31-11	
Apr. 17	Houston	No. 25	Lamson Park • Lafayette, LA	**W** 10-5	**Martinez** (3-3)	Shrum (2-2)	None		835	32-11	
Apr. 21	at Florida Atlantic	No. 25	FAU Softball Stadium • Boca Raton, FL	**W** 1-0 (8 inn)	**Wallace** (21-6)	Fawbush (12-10)	None			33-11	12-4
Apr. 21	at Florida Atlantic	No. 25	FAU Softball Stadium • Boca Raton, FL	**W** 8-4	**Wallace** (22-6)	Call (8-10)	None			34-11	13-4
Apr. 27	Troy	No. 22	Lamson Park • Lafayette, LA	**W** 9-1 (5 inn)	**Wallace** (23-6)	Hamilton (5-6)	None		812	35-11	14-4
Apr. 27	Troy	No. 22	Lamson Park • Lafayette, LA	**W** 6-0	**Brown** (8-1)	Affeldt (6-5)	**Wallace** (2)		812	36-11	15-4
Apr. 28	Troy	No. 22	Lamson Park • Lafayette, LA	**W** 7-2	**Wallace** (24-6)	Affeldt (6-6)	None		840	37-11	16-4

May (3-0)
Date	Opponent	Rank	Site/stadium	Score	Win	Loss	Save	TV	Attendance	Overall record	SBC record
May 4	at Louisiana-Monroe	No. 21	ULM Softball Complex • Monroe, LA	**W** 8-2	**Hamilton** (3-1)	Wilson (8-15)	None		582	38-11	17-4
May 4	at Louisiana-Monroe	No. 21	ULM Softball Complex • Monroe, LA	**W** 12-3 (5 inn)	**Wallace** (25-6)	Routzon (11-14)	None		582	39-11	18-4
May 5	at Louisiana-Monroe	No. 21	ULM Softball Complex • Monroe, LA	**W** 6-0	**Wallace** (26-6)	Routzon (11-15)	None		421	40-11	19-4

Post-Season (7-4)

SBC tournament (3-2)
Date	Opponent	Seed/rank	Site/stadium	Score	Win	Loss	Save	TV	Attendance	Overall record	SBC record
May 8	vs. FIU (Quarterfinals)	No. 21	Troy Softball Complex • Troy, AL	**W** 8-7 (8 inn)	**Wallace** (27-6)	Graves (6-3)	None			41-11	
May 9	vs. No. 19 South Alabama (Semifinals)	No. 21	Troy Softball Complex • Troy, AL	**L** 0-1 (8 inn)	Campbell (20-7)	**Wallace** (27-7)	None			41-12	
May 10	vs. Florida Atlantic (Loser's Bracket Championship)	No. 21	Troy Softball Complex • Troy, AL	**W** 15-0	**Brown** (9-1)	Fawbush (14-12)	None			42-12	
May 10	vs. Western Kentucky (Championship - Game 1)	No. 21	Troy Softball Complex • Troy, AL	**W** 3-2	**Wallace** (28-7)	Rousseau (23-6)	None			43-12	
May 11	vs. Western Kentucky (Championship - Game 2)	No. 21	Troy Softball Complex • Troy, AL	**L** 4-7	Rousseau (24-6)	**Brown** (9-2)	None			43-13	

NCAA tournament (4-2)
Date	Opponent	Seed/rank	Site/stadium	Score	Win	Loss	Save	TV	Attendance	Overall record	SBC record
Baton Rouge Regionals
May 17	vs. Northwestern State	No. 21	Tiger Park • Baton Rouge, LA	**W** 3-0	**Wallace** (29-7)	Roos (17-5)	None			44-13	
May 18	vs. No. 10 LSU	No. 21	Tiger Park • Baton Rouge, LA	**W** 3-0	**Wallace** (30-7)	Fico (24-12)	None		1,555	45-13	
May 19	vs. No. 10 LSU	No. 21	Tiger Park • Baton Rouge, LA	**W** 1-0	**Wallace** (31-7)	Fico (24-13)	None			46-13	
Ann Arbor Super Regionals
May 24	at No. 7 Michigan	No. 21	Alumni Field at the Wilpon Complex • Ann Arbor, MI	**L** 3-4 (8 inn)	Wagner (19-3)	**Wallace** (31-8)	None	ESPNU	1,530	46-14	
May 25	at No. 7 Michigan	No. 21	Alumni Field at the Wilpon Complex • Ann Arbor, MI	**W** 5-0	**Wallace** (32-8)	Driesenga (29-7)	None	ESPN2	2,293	47-14	
May 25	at No. 7 Michigan	No. 21	Alumni Field at the Wilpon Complex • Ann Arbor, MI	**L** 1-2	Driesenga (30-7)	**Wallace** (32-9)	None	ESPN2	2,293	47-15	

Schedule source:

== Baton Rouge Regional ==
Baton Rouge Regional Teams
(1) LSU Lady Tigers	(2) Louisiana–Lafayette Ragin' Cajuns	(3) Northwestern State Lady Demons	(4) Central Connecticut Blue Devils

First Round
9	LSU	3
Central Connecticut	2
Louisiana–Lafayette	3
Northwestern State	0
Lower round 1
Central Connecticut	9
Northwestern State	1

Semi-Finals
9	LSU	0
Louisiana–Lafayette	3
Lower final
Central Connecticut	0
9	LSU	11

Finals
Louisiana–Lafayette	1	–
9	LSU	0	–

== Ann Arbor Super Regional ==
Ann Arbor Super Regional Teams
(1) Michigan Wolverines	(2) Louisiana–Lafayette Ragin' Cajuns

Game 1
Rank	Team	Score
8	Michigan	4
	Louisiana–Lafayette	3

Game 2
Rank	Team	Score
8	Michigan	0
	Louisiana–Lafayette	5

Game 3
Rank	Team	Score
8	Michigan	2
	Louisiana–Lafayette	1
