= Ashley Chastain =

American softball coach

Ashley Chastain Woodard
Current position
- Title: Head coach
- Team: South Carolina
- Conference: SEC
- Record: 76–45 (.628)

Biographical details
- Born: Palmetto, Georgia, U.S.
- Education: South Carolina

Playing career
- 2009–2011: South Carolina

Coaching career (HC unless noted)

College Softball
- 2012: South Carolina (GA)
- 2014–2016: College of Charleston (asst)
- 2017: Michigan State (asst.)
- 2018–2019: Ole Miss (asst.)
- 2020–2024: Charlotte
- 2025–present: South Carolina

International Softball
- 2013: Germany National Softball (asst.)

Head coaching record
- Overall: 230–141 (.620)

Accomplishments and honors

Awards
- D1Softball Coach of the Year (2025)

Ashley Chastain is an American, former collegiate softball pitcher and current head coach at South Carolina. She played college softball and was a pitcher for South Carolina.

== Playing career ==
Chastain played college softball at South Carolina for three seasons and finished eleventh in career relief appearances for the Gamecocks. She led the team in starts, innings pitched and ERA during her junior season.

== Coaching career ==
=== College of Charleston ===
On October 22, 2013, Chastain was named assistant coach for the College of Charleston softball program.

=== Michigan State ===
On July 20, 2016, Chastain was named the new pitching coach for the Michigan State Spartans softball program.

=== Ole Miss ===
On November 1, 2017, Chastain was named the new pitching coach for the Ole Miss Rebels softball program.

=== Charlotte ===
On June 6, 2019, Chastain was named the new head coach for the Charlotte 49ers softball program. After leading the team to a 14-13 record in 2020 before the season was cut short due to COVID-19, the 49ers went 31-19 in 2021 (their highest win total since 2016) and won their first-ever Conference USA East Division title.

Ahead of the 2022 season, Charlotte for the first time was picked as preseason favorites to win the Conference USA regular-season title. On March 2, 2022, the 49ers defeated their highest-ranked opponent in program history, upsetting No. 6 Virginia Tech 5-2. She finished her tenure at Charlotte with a 154–96 overall record, a 65–32 conference record and two NCAA tournament berths in five seasons.

=== South Carolina ===
On June 11, 2024, Chastain was named the head coach of the South Carolina Gamecocks softball program. Chastain is an alumna of the University of South Carolina, having played from 2009 to 2011.

== Head coaching record ==
Record table
Season	Team	Overall	Conference	Standing	Postseason
Charlotte 49ers (Conference USA) (2020–2023)
2020	Charlotte	14–13 (Note: The season was not played past March 11 due to the COVID-19 pandemic in the United States.)	2–1	2nd (East)	Season canceled due to COVID-19
2021	Charlotte	31–19	14–6	1st (East)	
2022	Charlotte	35–23	12–12	4th (East)	
2023	Charlotte	35–23	16–7	1st	NCAA Regional
Charlotte 49ers (American Athletic Conference) (2024)
2024	Charlotte	39–18	21–6	T-1st	NCAA Regional
Charlotte:		154–96 (.616)	65–32 (.670)		
South Carolina Gamecocks (SEC) (2025–present)
2025	South Carolina	44–17	13–11	T–7th	NCAA Super Regional
2026	South Carolina	32–28	7–17	12th	NCAA Regional
2027	South Carolina	0–0	0–0		
South Carolina:		76–45 (.628)	20–28 (.417)		
Total:		230–141 (.620)			
National champion Postseason invitational champion Conference regular season champion Conference regular season and conference tournament champion Division regular season champion Division regular season and conference tournament champion Conference tournament champion
