= 2013 Oklahoma Sooners softball team =

American college softball season

2013 Oklahoma Sooners softball

Big 12 regular-season champions NCAA Norman Regional champion NCAA Norman Super Regional champion

National champions
- Conference: Big 12 Conference
- Record: 57–4 (15–2 Big 12)
- Head coach: Patty Gasso (19th season)
- Home stadium: OU Softball Complex

2013 Big 12 Conference softball standings
	Conf.				Overall
Team	W		L	PCT	W		L	PCT
No. 1 Oklahoma ‍†‍‍^{y}	15	–	2	.882	57	–	4	.934
No. 3 Texas ‍‍‍^{y}	14	–	4	.778	51	–	10	.836
No. 20 Baylor ‍‍‍^{y}	10	–	8	.556	42	–	17	.712
Kansas ‍‍‍	9	–	8	.529	34	–	16	.680
Oklahoma State ‍‍‍	6	–	12	.333	30	–	26	.536
Texas Tech ‍‍‍	4	–	14	.222	30	–	26	.536
Iowa State ‍‍‍	4	–	14	.222	21	–	34	.382
† – Conference champion y – Invited to the NCAA tournament Rankings from NFCA

The 2013 Oklahoma Sooners softball team represented the University of Oklahoma in the 2013 NCAA Division I softball season. The Sooners were coached by Patty Gasso, who led her nineteenth season. The Sooners finished with a record of 57–4. They played their home games at OU Softball Complex and competed in the Big 12 Conference, where they finished first with a 15–2 record.

The Sooners were invited to the 2013 NCAA Division I softball tournament, where they swept the Regionals and Super Regionals and then completed a run through the Women's College World Series to claim the NCAA Women's College World Series Championship.

== Roster ==
2013 Oklahoma Sooners roster
Pitchers: 10 - Keilani Ricketts – senior; 21 – Taylor Hodges – freshman; 32 – Michelle Gascoine – senior; 33 – Leslie Miller – freshman; Catchers: 13 – Whitney Montgomery – freshman; 18 – Jessica Shults – senior	Infielders: 1 – Shelby Pendley – sophomore; 7 – Javen Henson – junior; 17 – Kelley Reeves – sophomore; 27 – Jessica Vest – sophomore; 42 – Georgia Casey – sophomore; 44 - Lauren Chamberlain – sophomore	Outfielders: 00 – Destinee Martinez – junior; 2 – Brianna Turang – senior; 11 – Paris Townsend – freshman; 12 – Callie Parsons – sophomore; 22 – Kady Self – freshman; 23 – Brittany Williams – junior; 48 – Erin Miller – freshman

== Schedule ==
Legend
	Oklahoma win
	Oklahoma loss
*	Non-Conference game

2013 Oklahoma Sooners softball game log
Regular season

February
Date	Opponent	Site/stadium	Score	Overall record	Big 12 Record
Feb 8	vs No. 21 Stanford*	Alberta B. Farrington Softball Stadium • Tempe, AZ	W 6–0	1–0	
Feb 8	vs Oregon State*	Alberta B. Farrington Softball Stadium • Tempe, AZ	W 14–2^{5}	2–0	
Feb 9	vs No. 5 Oregon*	Alberta B. Farrington Softball Stadium • Tempe, AZ	W 12–0^{5}	3–0	
Feb 9	vs New Mexico*	Alberta B. Farrington Softball Stadium • Tempe, AZ	W 11–1^{5}	4–0	
Feb 10	vs Northwestern*	Alberta B. Farrington Softball Stadium • Tempe, AZ	W 7–4	5–0	
Feb 15	vs UC Riverside*	SDSU Softball Stadium • San Diego, CA	W 7–0	6–0	
Feb 15	at San Diego State*	SDSU Softball Stadium • San Diego, CA	W 4–0	7–0	
Feb 16	vs No. 24 Kentucky*	SDSU Softball Stadium • San Diego, CA	W 11–0^{5}	8–0	
Feb 16	vs No. 18 Washington*	SDSU Softball Stadium • San Diego, CA	W 2–0	9–0	
Feb 17	vs Notre Dame*	SDSU Softball Stadium • San Diego, CA	W 7–5^{9}	10–0	
Feb 21	vs No. 13 Georgia*	Palm Springs, CA	W 5–0	11–0	
Feb 21	vs No. 14 Arizona*	Palm Springs, CA	W 5–0	12–0	
Feb 22	vs UC Santa Barbara*	Palm Springs, CA	W 5–2	13–0	
Feb 22	vs Nebraska*	Palm Springs, CA	W 2–0	14–0	
Feb 23	vs No. 23 Florida State*	Palm Springs, CA	W 6–0	15–0	

March
Date	Opponent	Site/stadium	Score	Overall record	Big 12 Record
Mar 1	Houston*	OU Softball Complex • Norman, OK	W 6–0	16–0	
Mar 2	Nebraska*	OU Softball Complex • Norman, OK	W 10–3	17–0	
Mar 2	Nebraska*	OU Softball Complex • Norman, OK	L 0–1	17–1	
Mar 3	Houston*	OU Softball Complex • Norman, OK	W 4–1	18–1	
Mar 8	Northern Colorado*	OU Softball Complex • Norman, OK	W 14–0^{5}	19–1	
Mar 8	Drake*	OU Softball Complex • Norman, OK	W 10–2^{6}	20–1	
Mar 9	Northern Colorado*	OU Softball Complex • Norman, OK	W 10–0^{5}	21–1	
Mar 9	Drake*	OU Softball Complex • Norman, OK	W 13–0^{5}	22–1	
Mar 15	vs Pacific*	Anderson Family Field • Fullerton, CA	W 9–0^{5}	23–1	
Mar 15	vs NC State*	Anderson Family Field • Fullerton, CA	W 3–0	24–1	
Mar 16	vs No. 14 Arizona*	Anderson Family Field • Fullerton, CA	W 4–0	25–1	
Mar 16	vs Penn State*	Anderson Family Field • Fullerton, CA	W 8–0^{5}	26–1	
Mar 17	at Cal State Fullerton*	Anderson Family Field • Fullerton, CA	W 9–0^{5}	27–1	
Mar 23	No. 11 Louisville*	OU Softball Complex • Norman, OK	L 1–5	27–2	
Mar 23	No. 11 Louisville*	OU Softball Complex • Norman, OK	W 9–1^{5}	28–2	
Mar 27	at Wichita State*	Wilkins Stadium • Wichita, KS	W 7–1	29–2	
Mar 27	at Wichita State*	Wilkins Stadium • Wichita, KS	W 16–1^{5}	30–2	

April
Date	Opponent	Site/stadium	Score	Overall record	Big 12 Record
Apr 4	at No. 20 Tulsa*	Collins Family Softball Complex • Tulsa, OK	W 3–1	31–2	
Apr 5	No. 17 Baylor	OU Softball Complex • Norman, OK	W 8–3	32–2	1–0
Apr 6	No. 17 Baylor	OU Softball Complex • Norman, OK	W 9–3	33–2	2–0
Apr 7	No. 17 Baylor	OU Softball Complex • Norman, OK	W 8–0^{6}	34–2	3–0
Apr 12	at Texas Tech	Rocky Johnson Field • Lubbock, TX	W 9–0^{6}	35–2	4–0
Apr 13	at Texas Tech	Rocky Johnson Field • Lubbock, TX	W 6–0	36–2	5–0
Apr 14	at Texas Tech	Rocky Johnson Field • Lubbock, TX	W 13–7	37–2	6–0
Apr 19	at No. 6 Texas	Red and Charline McCombs Field • Austin, TX	W 6–1	38–2	7–0
Apr 20	at No. 6 Texas	Red and Charline McCombs Field • Austin, TX	L 2–4	38–3	7–1
Apr 21	at No. 6 Texas	Red and Charline McCombs Field • Austin, TX	W 5–3	39–3	8–1
Apr 23	at North Texas*	Lovelace Stadium • Denton, TX	W 12–1^{6}	40–3	
Apr 26	Iowa State	OU Softball Complex • Norman, OK	W 24–1^{5}	41–3	9–1
Apr 27	Iowa State	OU Softball Complex • Norman, OK	W 8–0^{5}	42–3	10–1
Apr 28	Iowa State	OU Softball Complex • Norman, OK	W 12–0^{5}	43–3	11–1

May
Date	Opponent	Site/stadium	Score	Overall record	Big 12 Record
May 5	at Kansas	Arrocha Ballpark • Lawrence, KS	W 4–2	44–3	12–1
May 5	at Kansas	Arrocha Ballpark • Lawrence, KS	L 0–2	44–4	12–2
May 10	vs Oklahoma State	ASA Hall of Fame Stadium • Oklahoma City, OK	W 10–1^{5}	45–4	13–2
May 11	Oklahoma State	OU Softball Complex • Norman, OK	W 4–0	46–4	14–2
May 12	at Oklahoma State	Cowgirl Stadium • Stillwater, OK	W 5–0	47–4	15–2

Postseason

NCAA Norman Regional
Date	Opponent	Site/stadium	Score	Overall record	Reg. Record
May 17	Marist	OU Softball Complex • Norman, OK	W 17–0^{5}	48–4	1–0
May 18	Arkansas	OU Softball Complex • Norman, OK	W 10–5	49–4	2–0
May 19	Arkansas	OU Softball Complex • Norman, OK	W 14–1^{5}	50–4	3–0

NCAA Norman Super Regional
Date	Opponent	Site/stadium	Score	Overall record	SR Record
May 24	(16) Texas A&M	OU Softball Complex • Norman, OK	W 10–2^{6}	51–4	1–0
May 25	(16) Texas A&M	OU Softball Complex • Norman, OK	W 8–0^{5}	52–4	2–0

NCAA Women's College World Series
Date	Opponent	Site/stadium	Score	Overall record	WCWS Record
May 30	(8) Michigan	ASA Hall of Fame Stadium • Oklahoma City, OK	W 7–1	53–4	1–0
June 1	(4) Texas	ASA Hall of Fame Stadium • Oklahoma City, OK	W 10–2	54–4	2–0
June 2	(11) Washington	ASA Hall of Fame Stadium • Oklahoma City, OK	W 6–2	55–4	3–0
June 3	(7) Tennessee	ASA Hall of Fame Stadium • Oklahoma City, OK	W 5–3^{10}	56–4	4–0
June 4	(7) Tennessee	ASA Hall of Fame Stadium • Oklahoma City, OK	W 4–0	57–4	5–0
