= 2013 Florida Gators softball team =

American college softball season

2013 Florida Gators softball
- Conference: Southeastern Conference
- East
- Head coach: Tim Walton
- Assistant coach: Kenny Gajewski, Jennifer Rocha
- Home stadium: Katie Seashole Pressly Softball Stadium

2013 Southeastern Conference softball standings
	Conf.				Overall
Team	W		L	PCT	W		L	PCT
Eastern
No. 5 Florida ^{x}‍†‍‡‍^{y}	18	–	6	.750	58	–	9	.866
No. 2 Tennessee ‍‍‍^{y}	16	–	6	.727	52	–	12	.813
No. 11 Missouri ‍‍‍^{y}	15	–	8	.652	38	–	14	.731
Georgia ‍‍‍^{y}	14	–	9	.609	40	–	21	.656
No. 14 Kentucky ‍‍‍^{y}	13	–	11	.542	41	–	21	.661
South Carolina ‍‍‍^{y}	8	–	16	.333	34	–	25	.576
Western
No. 18 LSU ^{x}‍‍‍^{y}	15	–	8	.652	42	–	16	.724
Arkansas ‍‍‍^{y}	12	–	10	.545	36	–	20	.643
No. 10 Alabama ‍‍‍^{y}	13	–	11	.542	45	–	15	.750
No. 13 Texas A&M ‍‍‍^{y}	10	–	13	.435	42	–	18	.700
Mississippi State ‍‍‍^{y}	8	–	16	.333	32	–	24	.571
Auburn ‍‍‍	7	–	17	.292	30	–	23	.566
Ole Miss ‍‍‍	3	–	21	.125	25	–	31	.446
x – Division champion † – Conference champion ‡ – Tournament champion y – Invited to the NCAA Tournament; As of June 30, 2013; Rankings from NFCA

The 2013 Florida Gators softball team represented the University of Florida softball program for the 2013 NCAA softball season.

== Roster ==
The 2013 Florida Gators softball team has 2 seniors, 2 juniors, 6 sophomores, and 6 freshmen.

#	Name	Position	Height	B/T	Year	Hometown
1	Aubree Munro	C	5-9		Fr	Brea, CA
4	Jessica Damico	UT	5-4		So	Gary Summit, MO
6	Kathlyn Medina	INF	5-4		So	Downey, CA
7	Kelsey Stewart	INF	5-6		Fr	Wichtia, KS
8	Alyssa Bache	RHP	5-10		So	Clearwater, FL
9	Stephanie Toft	UT	5-5		Jr	Lincoln, CA
11	Ensley Gammel	RHP/UT	5-6	R/R	Sr	Bakersfield, CA
12	Taylore Fuller	UT	5-7		Fr	Trenton, FL
13	Hannah Rogers	RHP	5-10		Jr	Lake Wales, FL
17	Lauren Haeger	RHP/1B	5-11		So	Peoria, AZ
20	Kelsey Horton	C	5-10	R/R	Sr	Valrico, FL
24	Kirsti Merritt	OF	5-4		Fr	Lake Panasoffkee, FL
27	Cari Broderick	C	5-11		Fr	Jacksonville, FL
49	Taylor Schwarz	1B	5-9		Fr	Palm Beach Gardens, FL
55	Briana Little	UT	5-4		So	Middleburg, FL
88	Bailey Castro	INF	5-17		So	Pembroke Pines, FL
