= Aggie Softball Complex =

Stadium in College Station, Texas

- Interactive map of Aggie Softball Complex
- Address: Olsen Blvd and Tom Chandler Rd
- Location: College Station Texas, United States 77840
- Coordinates: 30°36′17″N 96°20′37″W
- Owner: Texas A&M University
- Operator: Texas A&M University
- Capacity: 1,750
- Surface: Tifway 419 Bermuda Grass
- Record attendance: 2,341 (April 27, 2005 vs Texas Longhorns)
- Field size: 190ft (LF/RF), 220ft (CF)

Construction
- Opened: March 30, 1994
- Closed: April 15, 2018

Tenant
- Texas A&M Aggies softball (NCAA) (1994-2018)

The Aggie Softball Complex was the home to the Texas A&M Aggies softball team from 1994 to 2018. The stadium was dedicated on March 30, 1994. The final game played in the Aggie Softball Complex was April 15, 2018, a military appreciation game, against the Kentucky Wildcats. The record attendance for the complex is 2,341, set on April 27, 2005, versus the Texas Longhorns. Nineteen of the 20 highest attendance numbers were set during the 2005, 2006, and 2007 seasons. The stadium has hosted NCAA Regionals in 2005, 2007, 2008, 2011, 2012, 2013 and 2017 and NCAA Super Regionals in 2007 and 2008.

The Aggie Softball team now plays in the Davis Diamond which is located nearby.
