= UAB Blazers softball =

UAB Blazers
- 2026 UAB Blazers softball team
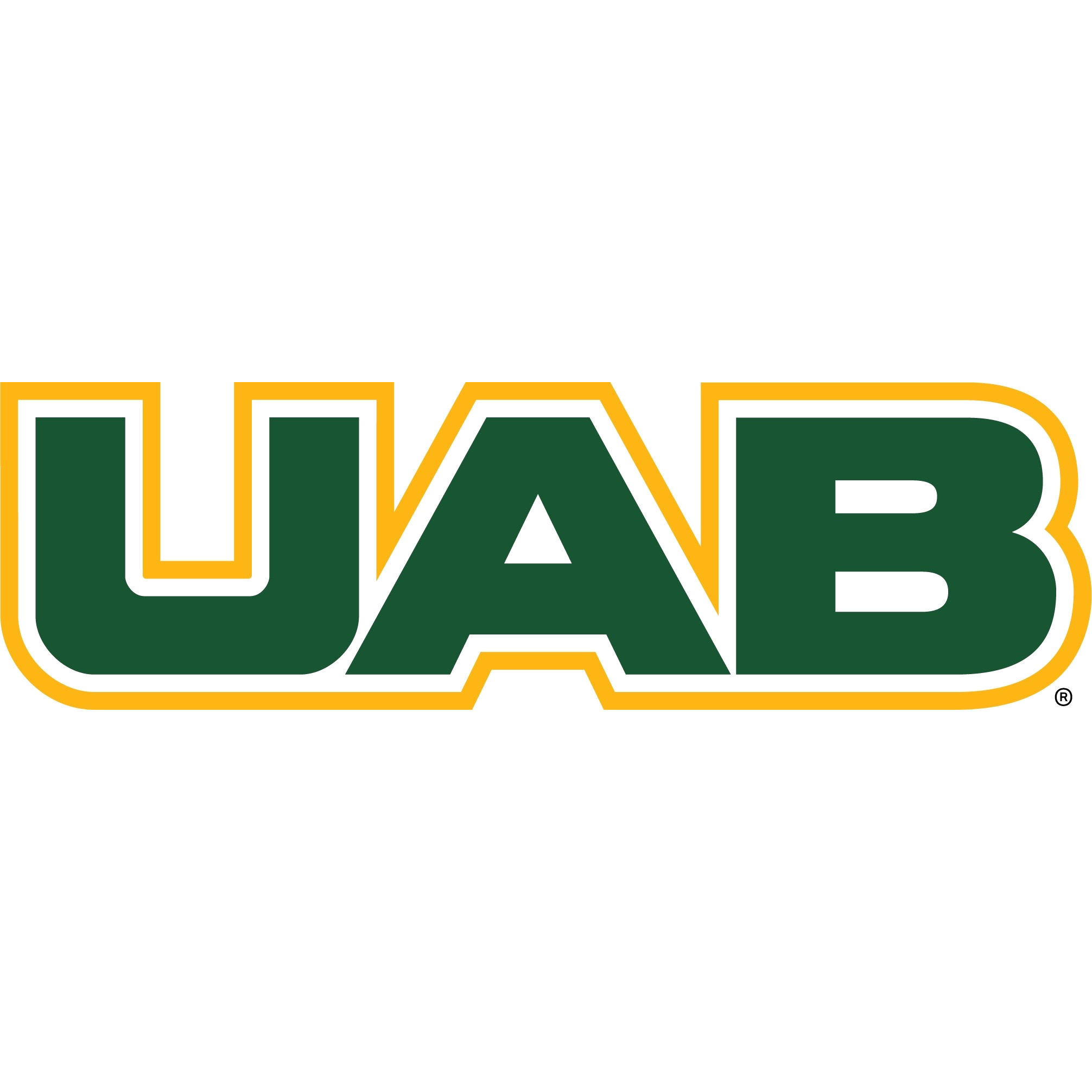
- Founded: 2000 (26 years ago)
- University: University of Alabama at Birmingham
- Athletic director: Mark Ingram
- Head coach: Megan Curry
- Conference: The American
- Location: Birmingham, Alabama
- Home stadium: Mary Bowers Field (capacity: 1,100)
- Nickname: Blazers
- Colors: UAB Green and UAB Gold

NCAA super regional appearances
- 2013

NCAA Tournament appearances
- 2010, 2011, 2012, 2013, 2014

The UAB Blazers softball team is a varsity intercollegiate athletic team of the University of Alabama at Birmingham in Birmingham, Alabama, United States. The team is a member of the American Conference, which is part of the National Collegiate Athletic Association's Division I. UAB's first softball team was fielded in 2000. The team plays its home games at Mary Bowers Field in Birmingham, Alabama.

== History ==
The UAB softball program began competition in 2000 under its first head coach, Marla Townsend. The team competed in Conference USA and recorded 39 wins in 2002, when Townsend was named Conference USA Coach of the Year. Early highlights for the program included a notable 2003 victory over No. 8 Oklahoma. Throughout its first decade, the Blazers focused on building a consistent presence within the conference, amassing over 250 wins by the end of the 2009 season.

From 2010 to 2014, UAB made five consecutive NCAA Tournament appearances. Mary Bowers Field opened in 2010 as the program’s home venue. In 2013, UAB captured its first Conference USA regular-season title. Also, in 2013, the team reached the NCAA super regionals and finished the season ranked No. 16 in national polls.

Following Marla Townsend’s tenure, Amanda Ellis and Jimmy Kolaitis each served as head coach.The 2020 season was shortened to 26 games due to the COVID-19 pandemic. Joe Guthrie was named head coach in July 2020, and coached the team for the 2021 and 2022 seasons. A.J. Daugherty was named head coach prior to the 2023 season, preceding the program’s move to the American Conference. A.J Daugherty resigned following the 2024 season, with Taylor Smartt being selected to replace him. Smartt led the Blazers to a 24-31 record during the 2025 season.

Taylor Smartt stepped away from the program on April 28, 2026, amid misconduct allegations. Smartt did not coach the final five games of the 2026 season or in the conference tournament. Although she was not formally named interim head coach, Anna Shelnutt assumed head coaching duties for the remainder of the season. Following an investigation, UAB announced on July 9, 2026, that Smartt would not return to the program and named Shelnutt interim head coach. Megan Curry was hired on July 27, 2026 to be the program's head coach.

== Conference affiliation ==
American logo in UAB's colors

NCAA

- Conference USA (2000-2023)
- American Conference (2023–present)

== Head coaches ==
Record through the 2026 season.

Coach	Years	Seasons	Overall	Pct.	Conf.	Pct.	Postseason
Marla Townsend	1999–2017	19	532–507	.512	211–214	.496	5 NCAA (1 Super Regional)
Amanda Ellis (Interim)	2018	1	26–32–1	.449	10–13–1	.438	—
Jimmy Kolaitis	2019–2020	2	34–42	.447	12–19	.387	—
Joe Guthrie	2021–2022	2	56–43	.566	28–15	.651	—
A.J. Daugherty	2023–2024	2	52–54	.491	30–21	.588	—
Taylor Smartt	2025–2026.	2	45–64	.413	18–36	.370	—
Total							5 NCAA Berths

== Year by year results ==
UAB softball history year-by-year results.

Season	Coach	Overall	Conference	Standing	Postseason
Conference USA (2000–2023)
2000	Marla Townsend	23–38	6–12	5th	—
2001	Marla Townsend	27–35	10–11	5th	—
2002	Marla Townsend	39–22	14–10	4th	—
2003	Marla Townsend	28–28	10–14	T–6th	—
2004	Marla Townsend	20–36	7–17	9th	—
2005	Marla Townsend	21–37	6–18	9th	—
2006	Marla Townsend	31–22	15–9	3rd	—
2007	Marla Townsend	27–35	10–14	6th	—
2008	Marla Townsend	26–31	9–15	7th	—
2009	Marla Townsend	21–34	8–16	8th	—
2010	Marla Townsend	37–22	15–9	3rd	NCAA Regional
2011	Marla Townsend	39–19	17–6	2nd	NCAA Regional
2012	Marla Townsend	37–22	17–7	2nd	NCAA Regional
2013	Marla Townsend	40–19	19–4	1st	NCAA Super Regional
2014	Marla Townsend	32–27	15–8	2nd	NCAA Regional
2015	Marla Townsend	32–19	15–7	2nd	—
2016	Marla Townsend	26–33	12–12	3rd (West)	—
2017	Marla Townsend	21–32	12–12	5th (West)	—
2018	Amanda Ellis	26–32–1	10–13–1	4th (West)	—
2019	Jimmy Kolaitis	19–31	8–15	5th (West)	—
2020	Jimmy Kolaitis	15–11	4–4	N/A	Season cancelled (COVID-19)
2021	Joe Guthrie	31–19	15–5	2nd (West)	—
2022	Joe Guthrie	25–24	13–10	4th (West)	—
2023	A.J. Daugherty	25–25	16–8	2nd	—
American Conference (2024–Present)
2024	A.J. Daugherty	27–29	14–13	6th	—
2025	Taylor Smartt	24–31	10–17	8th	—
2026	Taylor Smartt	21–33	8–19	9th	—
Total				—	5 NCAA Berths

Conference regular season champion	NCAA Tournament appearance

== Post-season results ==
2010 NCAA Tournament (Tuscaloosa Regional)

Date	Opponent	Result	Score
May 21	Lipscomb	Loss	4–1
May 22	Alcorn State	Win	10–1
May 22	Lipscomb	Loss	7–6

2011 NCAA Tournament (Athens Regional)

Date	Opponent	Result	Score
May 20	Florida State	Win	2–0
May 21	Georgia	Loss	9–2
May 21	Florida State	Loss	13–1

2012 NCAA Tournament (Knoxville Regional)

Date	Opponent	Result	Score
May 18	Virginia Tech	Loss	4–1
May 19	Tennessee	Loss	8–0

2013 NCAA Tournament (Louisville Regional)

Date	Opponent	Result	Score
May 17	UCLA	Win	6–3
May 18	Louisville	Win	7–4
May 19	UCLA	Loss	4–1
May 19	UCLA	Win	3–2

2013 NCAA Tournament (Gainesville Super Regional)

Date	Opponent	Result	Score
May 25	Florida	Loss	4–3
May 26	Florida	Loss	1–0

2014 NCAA Tournament (Athens Regional)

Date	Opponent	Result	Score
May 16	NC State	Loss	4–0
May 17	Chattanooga	Win	9–2
May 17	Georgia	Loss	3–0

== Facilities ==
=== Mary Bowers Field ===
In 2010, the team moved to an on-campus stadium. Before moving to the on campus stadium UAB played their games at George Ward Park The facility was renamed Mary Bowers Field in 2016 in recognition of gifts from Mary and Keith A. Bowers.
