= Madison Shipman =

American softball player

Personal information
- Full name: Madison Taylor Shipman
- Born: 1992 (age 33–34) Houston, Texas, U.S.
- Height: 6 ft 1 in (1.85 m)

Sport
- Country: USA
- Sport: Softball
- College team: Tennessee Volunteers

Madison Taylor Shipman (born June 25, 1992) is an American analyst and broadcaster for the Toronto Blue Jays and former professional softball player. She played college softball at Tennessee before joining the USSSA Pride and the Scrap Yard Dawgs of National Pro Fastpitch.

== Personal life ==
Shipman was born on June 25, 1992, in Houston, Texas, to Bill and Lorri Shipman. She was raised as one of four siblings, two sisters and a brother. While she was born in Texas, Shipman grew up in California, USA, where she learned to play softball at age 8 with encouragement from her father. In order to learn the game of softball, Shipman's father encouraged her to watch Major League Baseball (MLB) games.

== Playing career ==
=== High school ===
Shipman attended Valencia High School from 2007 to 2010. During her freshman and sophomore years, she helped Valencia win back-to-back CIF Southern Section titles. She committed to the University of Tennessee in December 2007 halfway through her sophomore year. In 2008, 2009 and 2010, Shipman was named first team All-California Interscholastic Federation as well as Cal-Hi Sports All-State and to the All-Foothill League Team. Due to her successful high school career, she was considered the nation's No. 2 recruit by ESPNU, behind only Dallas Escobedo. Following her senior year, Shipman was named to the United States Junior National Softball Team for the 2010 Pan American Games where she won a gold medal.

=== Collegiate ===
Shipman attended the University of Tennessee, where she played for the Tennessee Volunteers softball team from 2011-2014. After earning a spot in the starting lineup as a freshman in 2011, Shipman recorded a .292 average, 40 hits, eight doubles, five home runs, 27 RBI, and 28 runs. She was subsequently named to the Freshman All-SEC team and all-SEC Freshman Academic Honor Roll. As a shortstop, she helped lead Tennessee to back-to-back Women's College World Series appearances in 2012 and 2013.

In her senior year, Shipman set career highs with .417 batting average, 56 runs, 18 homers, 46 walks, .548 on-base percentage, .833 slugging percentage and 1.381 OPS. She also tied Kristi Durant's single-season school record 20-game hitting streak and set a new Tennessee single-game assist record. On March 24, Shipman was named SEC Player of the Week for the second time. Her efforts were also recognized with the Senior CLASS Award for softball and the SEC Player of the Year award. She also won the Honda Sports Award as the nation's top softball player. She finished her years at Tennessee ranking fifth in program history in career home runs, fifth in career doubles, fifth in career RBI, fourth in career total bases, fourth in career assists, seventh in career walks, and second in career grand slams.

=== Professional ===
Following her senior year, Shipman was selected second overall in the 2014 National Pro Fastpitch Senior Draft by the USSSA Pride. She became the 12th Lady Vol to be selected in the annual NPF College Draft. In her rookie season, Shipman played in 44 of 48 games while hitting .344 with 28 RBI's and five home runs. She also led the league in doubles and anchored the Pride's middle infield with a .931 fielding percentage. As a result of her play, she was named Rookie of the Year and won the 2014 championship with the Pride. On April 8, 2016, Shipman and Bridgette Del Ponte were traded to the Scrap Yard Dawgs.

== Broadcasting career ==
After stepping down as a volunteer assistant coach for the Lady Vol's in 2018, Shipman was recruited into broadcasting by Meg Aronowitz, the ESPN & SEC Network Coordinating Producer for softball. She began appearing on SEC Now every Thursday and Friday and worked in the SEC studio during regional, super regional and Women's College World Series coverage. While doing game analysis for the SEC, she gained the attention of the Toronto Blue Jays of Major League Baseball (MLB). She was then recruited to serve as an in-studio baseball analyst for Sportsnet in 2023. On July 10, 2026, she became the first woman to call a regular-season Blue Jays game on television.

== Statistics ==
=== Tennessee Lady Vols ===
YEAR	G	AB	R	H	BA	RBI	HR	3B	2B	TB	SLG	BB	SO	SB	SBA
2011	58	137	27	40	.292	27	5	0	8	63	.460	13	18	8	10
2012	66	212	41	66	.311	63	10	2	11	111	.523	23	22	21	25
2013	64	210	52	77	.366	63	11	0	20	130	.619	23	23	16	21
2014	58	168	56	70	.416	54	18	0	16	140	.833	46	8	13	17
TOTALS	246	727	176	253	.348	207	44	2	55	444	.610	105	71	58	73
