= 2013 NCAA Division I softball tournament =

- Teams: 64
- Finals site: ASA Hall of Fame Stadium; Oklahoma City
- Champions: Oklahoma (2nd title)
- Runner-up: Tennessee (6th WCWS Appearance)
- Winning coach: Patty Gasso (2nd title)
- MOP: Keilani Ricketts (Oklahoma)

The 2013 NCAA Division I softball tournament was held from May 16 through June 4, 2013 as the final part of the 2013 NCAA Division I softball season. The 64 NCAA Division I college softball teams were selected out of an eligible 284 teams on May 12, 2012. 31 teams were awarded an automatic bid as champions of their conference, and 33 teams were selected at-large by the NCAA Division I Softball Selection Committee. The tournament culminated with eight teams playing in the 2013 Women's College World Series at ASA Hall of Fame Stadium in Oklahoma City.

== Automatic bids ==
Conference	School
ACC	NC State
America East	Stony Brook
Atlantic 10	Fordham
Atlantic Sun	South Carolina Upstate
Big 12	Oklahoma
Big East	Notre Dame
Big Sky	Portland State
Big South	Longwood
Big Ten	Wisconsin
Big West	Hawaii
Colonial	Hofstra
Conference USA	Marshall
Horizon	Valparaiso
Ivy	Penn
Mid-American	Central Michigan
Metro Atlantic	Marist
Mid-Eastern	Hampton
Missouri Valley	Northern Iowa
Mountain West	San Diego State
Northeast	Central Connecticut
Ohio Valley	Jacksonville State
Pac–12	Oregon
Pacific Coast	BYU
Patriot	Army
SEC	Florida
Southern	Georgia Southern
Southland	Northwestern State
SWAC	Mississippi Valley State
Summit	IPFW
Sun Belt	South Alabama
WAC	San Jose State

== National seeds ==
Teams in "italics" advanced to super regionals. Teams in "bold" advanced to Women's College World Series.

1. Oklahoma
2. Florida
3. Oregon
4. Texas
5. Arizona State
6. Missouri
7. Tennessee
8. Michigan
9. LSU
10. Alabama
11. Washington
12. Kentucky
13. South Alabama
14. Nebraska
15. Louisville
16. Texas A&M

== Regionals and super regionals ==
=== Norman Super Regional ===
First round	Round 2
1	Oklahoma	17^{5}
Marist	0
1	Oklahoma	10
Arkansas	5
Fordham	1
Arkansas	5
Norman Regional
Marist	3
Fordham	5
Fordham	2
Arkansas	5
16	Texas A&M	12^{5}
Penn	0
16	Texas A&M	6
Baylor	5
Baylor	7
Arizona	0
College Station Regional
Penn	2
Arizona	3^{8}
Arizona	4
Baylor	8

Regional finals
1	Oklahoma	14^{5}	—
Arkansas	1	—
16	Texas A&M	5	8^{5}
Baylor	9	0

Super regionals
1	Oklahoma	10^{6}	8^{5}	—
16	Texas A&M	2	0	—

=== Ann Arbor Super Regional ===
First round	Round 2
8	Michigan	5
Valparaiso	0
8	Michigan	5
California	0
California	8
Central Michigan	1
Michigan Regional
Valparaiso	7
Central Michigan	4
Valparaiso	0
California	6
9	LSU	3
Central Connecticut	2
9	LSU	0
Louisiana–Lafayette	3
Louisiana–Lafayette	3
Northwestern State	0
Baton Rouge Regional
Central Connecticut	9
Northwestern State	1
Central Connecticut	0
9	LSU	11^{6}

Regional finals
8	Michigan	3	—
California	1	—
Louisiana–Lafayette	1	—
9	LSU	0	—

Super regionals
8	Michigan	4^{8}	0	2
Louisiana–Lafayette	3	5	1

=== Tempe Super Regional ===
Round 1	Round 2
5	Arizona State	5
San Jose State	2
5	Arizona State	2
Georgia	0
Georgia	9
San Diego State	3
Tempe Regional
San Jose State	2
San Diego State	5
San Diego State	2
Georgia	3
12	Kentucky	2^{8}
Marshall	1
12	Kentucky	6
Virginia Tech	2
Notre Dame	3
Virginia Tech	4
Lexington Regional
Marshall	3
Notre Dame	1
Marshall	2
Virginia Tech	3^{11}

Regional finals
5	Arizona State	2	—
Georgia	0	—
12	Kentucky	0	1
Virginia Tech	2	0

Super regionals
5	Arizona State	5	5	—
12	Kentucky	4	2	—

=== Austin Super Regional ===
Round 1	Round 2
4	Texas	5
Army	0
4	Texas	11^{5}
South Carolina	2
Houston	4
South Carolina	6
Austin Regional
Army	5
Houston	7
Houston	1
South Carolina	5
13	South Alabama	10^{6}
Mississippi Valley State	0
13	South Alabama	1
Florida State	2
Mississippi State	2
Florida State	5
Mobile Regional
Mississippi Valley State	1
Mississippi State	2
Mississippi State	0
13	South Alabama	3

Regional finals
4	Texas	6	—
South Carolina	0	—
Florida State	0	7^{8}
13	South Alabama	3	6

Super regionals
4	Texas	3	4	—
Florida State	2	0	—

=== Eugene Super Regional ===
Round 1	Round 2
3	Oregon	5
BYU	2
3	Oregon	3
North Carolina	0
North Carolina	3^{8}
Wisconsin	2
Eugene Regional
BYU	0
Wisconsin	6
North Carolina	2
Wisconsin	6
14	Nebraska	4
Northern Iowa	0
14	Nebraska	7
Stanford	1
Stanford	4
Tulsa	2
Lincoln Regional
Northern Iowa	2
Tulsa	1
Northern Iowa	1
Stanford	4

Regional finals
3	Oregon	3	—
Wisconsin	0	—
14	Nebraska	10	—
Stanford	5	—

Super regionals
3	Oregon	2	4^{11}	2
14	Nebraska	5	3	4

=== Columbia Super Regional ===
Round 1	Round 2
6	Missouri	3
Stony Brook	0
6	Missouri	1
Hofstra	0
Hofstra	2
Oregon State	0
Columbia Regional
Stony Brook	0
Oregon State	6
Oregon State	4
Hofstra	8^{10}
11	Washington	2
Portland State	1
11	Washington	2
Hawaii	0
Minnesota	0
Hawaii	3
Seattle Regional
Portland State	0
Minnesota	5
Minnesota	0
Hawaii	3

Regional finals
6	Missouri	0	5
Hofstra	10^{5}	0
11	Washington	8^{5}	—
Hawaii	0	—

Super regionals
6	Missouri	1	0	—
11	Washington	2^{8}	1	—

=== Knoxville Super Regional ===
Round 1	Round 2
7	Tennessee	9^{5}
Longwood	0
7	Tennessee	1^{11}
NC State	0
James Madison	0
NC State	2
Knoxville Regional
Longwood	0
James Madison	5
James Madison	4
NC State	6
10	Alabama	4
Jacksonville State	0
10	Alabama	7
Western Kentucky	6
Western Kentucky	3
South Carolina Upstate	0
Tuscaloosa Regional
Jacksonville State	0
South Carolina Upstate	8^{5}
South Carolina Upstate	0
Western Kentucky	3

Regional finals
7	Tennessee	7	—
NC State	0	—
10	Alabama	13^{5}	—
Western Kentucky	1	—

Super regionals
7	Tennessee	3	5	—
10	Alabama	2	3	—

=== Gainesville Super Regional ===
Round 1	Round 2
2	Florida	7
Hampton	1
2	Florida	11^{5}
South Florida	1
South Florida	1^{8}
Georgia Southern	0
Gainesville Regional
Hampton	0
Georgia Southern	3
Georgia Southern	1
South Florida	2^{9}
15	Louisville	2
IPFW	1
15	Louisville	4
UAB	7
UAB	6
UCLA	3
Louisville Regional
IPFW	0
UCLA	8
UCLA	19^{5}
15	Louisville	2

Regional finals
2	Florida	2	—
South Florida	0	—
UAB	1	3^{13}
UCLA	4	2

Super regionals
2	Florida	4	1	—
UAB	3	0	—

== Women's College World Series ==
The Women's College World Series was held 30 May through June 4 in Oklahoma City.

=== Participants ===
School	Conference	Record (conference)	Head coach	Previous WCWS appearances	WCWS best finish	WCWS W–L record
Arizona State	Pac-12	50–10 (16–8)	Clint Myers	11 (last: 2011)	1st (2008, 2011)	17–14
Florida	SEC	57–7 (21–6)	Tim Walton	5 (last: 2011)	2nd (2011, 2009)	11–9
Michigan	Big Ten	50–11 (21–2)	Carol Hutchins	10 (last: 2009)	1st (2005)	8–18
Nebraska	Big Ten	45–14 (16–6)	Rhonda Revelle	7 (last: 2002)	2nd (1985)	11–13
Oklahoma	Big 12	52–4 (15–2)	Patty Gasso	8 (last: 2012)	1st (2000)	11–12
Tennessee	SEC	49–10 (16–6)	Ralph Weekly; Karen Weekly	6 (last: 2012)	2nd (2007)	11–10
Texas	Big 12	49–8 (14–4)	Connie Clark	5 (last: 2006)	3rd (2003, 2005)	5–8
Washington	Pac-12	43–15 (16–8)	Heather Tarr	10 (last: 2010)	1st (2009)	17–15

=== Bracket ===
First round
14	Nebraska	3^{(8)}
11	Washington	4
7	Tennessee	9
2	Florida	2
14	Nebraska	8^{(15)}
2	Florida	9
5	Arizona State	3
4	Texas	5
8	Michigan	1
1	Oklahoma	7
5	Arizona State	0
8	Michigan	2

Second round
11	Washington	0
7	Tennessee	1
2	Florida	0
4	Texas	3
4	Texas	2
1	Oklahoma	10
8	Michigan	1
11	Washington	4

Semifinals
7	Tennessee	2	—
4	Texas	0	—
1	Oklahoma	6	—
11	Washington	2	—

Finals
7	Tennessee	3^{(12)}	0	—
1	Oklahoma	5	4	—

=== Finals ===
==== Game 1 ====
June 3, 2013 – 7:00 p.m. (CDT) at ASA Hall of Fame Stadium in Oklahoma City, Oklahoma
Team	1	2	3	4	5	6	7	8	9	10	11	12	R	H	E
Tennessee	0	0	0	0	0	0	0	0	0	0	3	0	3	5	1
Oklahoma	0	0	0	0	0	0	0	0	0	0	3	2	5	10	1
WP: Keilani Ricketts (35–1) LP: Ellen Renfroe (19–5); Home runs: TENN: Madison Shipman; OKLA: Lauren Chamberlain; Attendance: 8,300; Boxscore

==== Game 2 ====
June 4, 2013 – 7:00 p.m. CDT at ASA Hall of Fame Stadium in Oklahoma City, Oklahoma
Team	1	2	3	4	5	6	7	R	H	E
Oklahoma	0	0	3	0	0	0	1	4	7	0
Tennessee	0	0	0	0	0	0	0	0	3	0
WP: Michelle Gascoigne (19–3) LP: Ivy Renfroe (22–5); Home runs: OKLA: Keilani Ricketts; TENN: None; Attendance: 8,527; Boxscore

== Media Coverage ==
=== Radio ===
Dial Global Sports provided nationwide radio coverage of the championship series, which was also streamed online at dialglobalsports.com. Kevin Kugler and Leah Amico provided the call for Dial Global.

=== Television ===
ESPN carried every game from the Women's College World Series across the ESPN Networks (ESPN, ESPN2, and ESPNU). The ESPN Networks also carried select regional matches and every super regional match utilizing ESPN, ESPN2, ESPNU, and ESPN3. Austin hosted a regional, and the Texas games aired on Longhorn Network while the other matches will air on ESPN3. This was the second consecutive year Longhorn Network carried regional matches.

==== Broadcast Assignments ====
Regionals

- Pam Ward & Michele Mary Smith – College Station, TX
- Beth Mowins & Jessica Mendoza – Tempe, AZ
- Sam Gore & Garland Cooper – Ann Arbor, MI
- Melissa Lee & Charlotte Morgan – Mobile, AL
- Cara Capuano & Leah Amico – Lexington, KY
- Mark Neely & Amanda Freed – Columbia, SC
- Carter Blackburn & Amanda Scarborough – Austin, TX
- Jeanne Zelasko & Tracy Warren – Norman, OK

Women's College World Series

- Pam Ward or Beth Mowins, Jessica Mendoza or Michele Mary Smith & Holly Rowe

Super regionals

- Pam Ward & Michele Mary Smith – Norman, OK
- Mark Neely & Amanda Freed – Columbia, SC
- Joe Davis & Garland Cooper – Ann Arbor, MI
- Beth Mowins & Jessica Mendoza – Knoxville, TN
- Holly Rowe & Amanda Scarborough – Austin, TX
- Jeanne Zelasko & Cheri Kempf – Gainesville, FL
- Adam Amin & Jennie Finch – Eugene, OR
- Cara Capuano & Leah Amico – Tempe, AZ

Women's College World Series championship series

- Beth Mowins, Jessica Mendoza, Michele Mary Smith & Holly Rowe
