= South Carolina Gamecocks softball =

South Carolina Gamecocks
- 2027 South Carolina Gamecocks softball team
- Founded: 1974 (52 years ago)
- University: University of South Carolina
- All-time Record: 1,767–980–6 (.644)
- Head coach: Ashley Chastain (3rd season)
- Conference: SEC
- Location: Columbia, South Carolina, US
- Home stadium: Carolina Softball Stadium at Beckham Field (capacity: 1,277)
- Nickname: Gamecocks
- Colors: Garnet and black

NCAA WCWS appearances
- 1983, 1989, 1997

AIAW WCWS appearances
- 1972, 1973, 1974, 1976, 1978, 1979, 1980, 1981

NCAA super regional appearances
- 2007, 2018, 2025

NCAA Tournament appearances
- 1982, 1983, 1988, 1989, 1994, 1995, 1996, 1997, 1999, 2000, 2001, 2002, 2003, 2004, 2007, 2013, 2014, 2015, 2016, 2017, 2018, 2019, 2023, 2024, 2025, 2026

Conference tournament championships
- 1997, 2000

Regular-season conference championships
- 1997

The South Carolina Gamecocks softball team represents the University of South Carolina in NCAA Division I college softball. The team joined the Southeastern Conference in 1997 when the conference began to sponsor the sport. Prior to 1997, the team competed as an Independent. They play their home games at the Carolina Softball Stadium at Beckham Field. The softball team has been able to win three SEC titles and they have participated in eleven Women's College World Series. Following the end of the 2024 regular season, their all-time record is at 1,767–980–6 (.644).

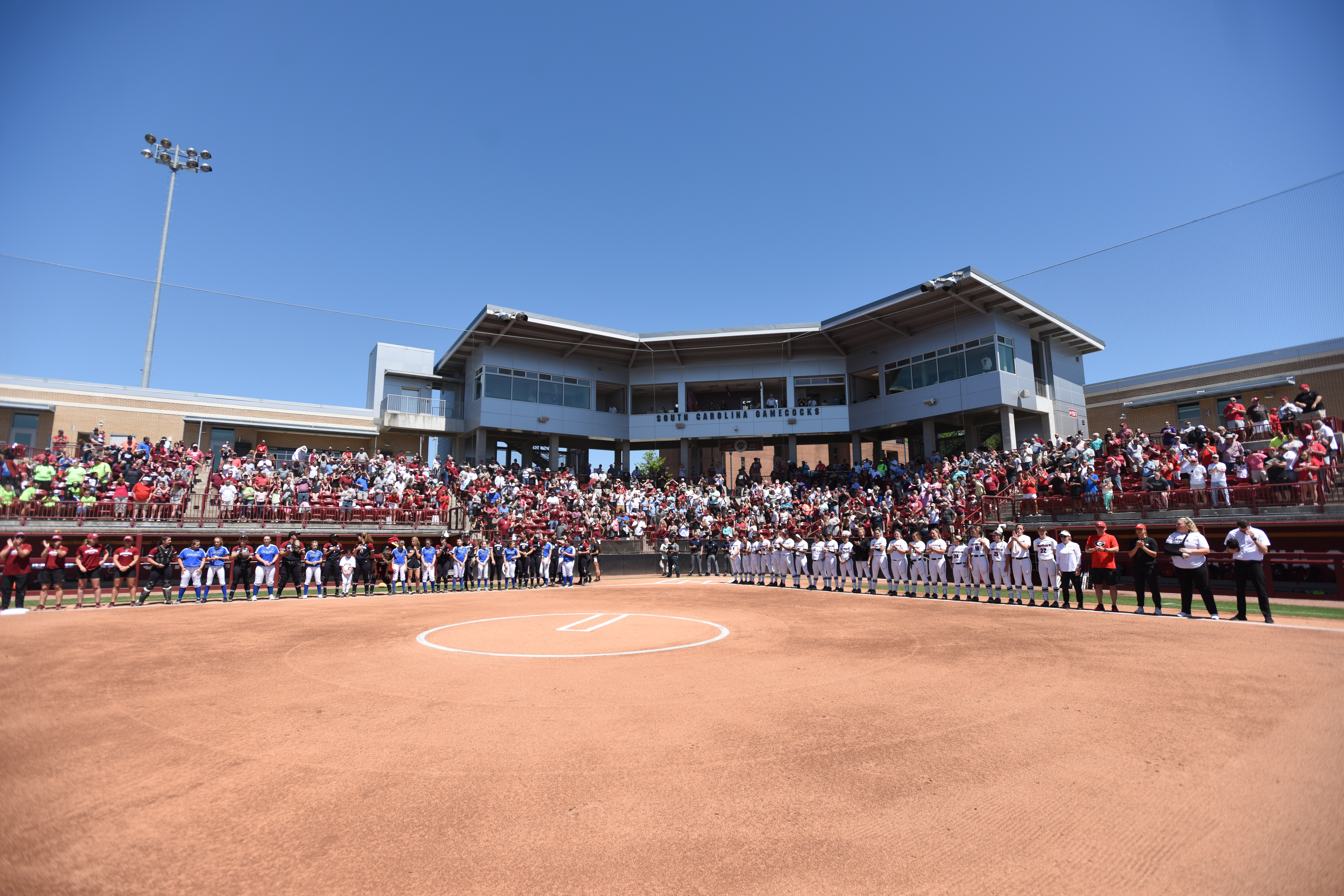
The Gamecocks home stadium (Carolina Softball Stadium at Beckham Field), before a game in 2019.

== Head coaches ==
| Years | Coach | Record | % |
|---|---|---|---|
| 1974 | Pam Backhaus | 7–3 | .700 |
| 1975 | Vivian Hamilton | 8–4 | .667 |
| 1976 | Frankie Porter | 21–2 | .913 |
| 1977 | Elaine Taylor | 12–7 | .632 |
| 1978 | Molly Maguire | 16–9 | .640 |
| 1979–1981 | Judy Martino | 91–35 | .722 |
| 1982 | Terri Drake | 25–9 | .735 |
| 1983–1986 | Lou Piel | 101–58–3 | .633 |
| 1987–2010 | Joyce Compton | 951–486–3 | .661 |
| 2011–2024 | Beverly Smith | 461–323 | .588 |
| 2025–present | Ashley Chastain | 74–42 | .638 |

== Coaching staff ==
| Name | Position coached | Consecutive season at South Carolina in current position |
|---|---|---|
| Ashley Chastain | Head coach | 3rd |
| Katie Rietkovich Browder | Associate Head coach | 3rd |
| Jody Davidson | Assistant coach | 3rd |
| Zack Parsons | Assistant coach | 3rd |

== Year-by-year results ==
| Season | Coach | Overall | Conference | Standing | Postseason |
|---|---|---|---|---|---|
Pam Backhaus (Independent) (1974–1974)
| 1974 | Pam Backhaus | 7–3 | 0–0 | | AIAW Women's College World Series |
| Pam Backhaus: | | 7–3 (.700) | – (–) | | |
Vivian Hamilton (Independent) (1975–1975)
| 1975 | Vivian Hamilton | 8–4 | 0–0 | | |
| Vivian Hamilton: | | 8–4 (.667) | – (–) | | |
Frankie Porter (Independent) (1976–1976)
| 1975 | Frankie Porter | 21–2 | 0–0 | | AIAW Women's College World Series |
| Frankie Porter: | | 21–2 (.913) | – (–) | | |
Elaine Taylor (Independent) (1977–1977)
| 1977 | Elaine Taylor | 12–7 | 0–0 | | |
| Elaine Taylor: | | 12–7 (.632) | – (–) | | |
Molly Maguire (Independent) (1978–1978)
| 1978 | Molly Maguire | 16–9 | 0–0 | | AIAW Women's College World Series |
| Molly Maguire: | | 16–9 (.640) | – (–) | | |
Judy Martino (Independent) (1979–1981)
| 1979 | Judy Martino | 38–14 | 0–0 | | AIAW Women's College World Series |
| 1980 | Judy Martino | 28–6 | 0–0 | | |
| 1981 | Judy Martino | 25–15 | 0–0 | | AIAW Women's College World Series |
| Judy Martino: | | 91–35 (.722) | – (–) | | |
Terri Drake (Independent) (1982–1982)
| 1982 | Terri Drake | 25–9 | 0–0 | | NCAA Tournament |
| Terri Drake: | | 25–9 (.735) | – (–) | | |
Lou Piel (Independent) (1983–1986)
| 1983 | Lou Piel | 30–10 | 0–0 | | Women's College World Series |
| 1984 | Lou Piel | 15–18 | 0–0 | | |
| 1985 | Lou Piel | 34–10–3 | 0–0 | | |
| 1986 | Lou Piel | 22–20 | 0–0 | | |
| Lou Piel: | | 101–58–3 (.633) | – (–) | | |
Joyce Compton (Independent) (1987–1996)
| 1987 | Joyce Compton | 34–14 | 0–0 | | |
| 1988 | Joyce Compton | 47–14 | 0–0 | | NCAA Tournament |
| 1989 | Joyce Compton | 46–12 | 0–0 | | Women's College World Series |
| 1990 | Joyce Compton | 49–14 | 0–0 | | |
| 1991 | Joyce Compton | 51–13 | 0–0 | | |
| 1992 | Joyce Compton | 54–14 | 0–0 | | |
| 1993 | Joyce Compton | 36–21–1 | 0–0 | | |
| 1994 | Joyce Compton | 52–17 | 0–0 | | NCAA Tournament |
| 1995 | Joyce Compton | 53–21 | 0–0 | | NCAA Tournament |
| 1996 | Joyce Compton | 38–13 | 0–0 | | NCAA Tournament |
Joyce Compton (SEC) (1997–2010)
| 1997 | Joyce Compton | 63–5 | 25–1 | 1st | Women's College World Series |
| 1998 | Joyce Compton | 36–21 | 15–11 | 2nd (East) | |
| 1999 | Joyce Compton | 49–21 | 17–11 | T-1st (East) | NCAA Tournament |
| 2000 | Joyce Compton | 41–28 | 11–16 | 3rd (East) | NCAA Tournament |
| 2001 | Joyce Compton | 40–20–1 | 18–8 | 1st (East) | NCAA Tournament |
| 2002 | Joyce Compton | 46–20 | 20–10 | 1st (East) | NCAA Tournament |
| 2003 | Joyce Compton | 41–20 | 18–10 | 2nd (East) | NCAA Tournament |
| 2004 | Joyce Compton | 28–24 | 12–18 | 4th (East) | NCAA Tournament |
| 2005 | Joyce Compton | 28–28–1 | 11–16 | 4th (East) | |
| 2006 | Joyce Compton | 28–30 | 8–21 | 4th (East) | |
| 2007 | Joyce Compton | 38–26 | 12–16 | 4th (East) | NCAA Super Regional |
| 2008 | Joyce Compton | 21–26 | 8–18 | 4th (East) | |
| 2009 | Joyce Compton | 21–24 | 6–21 | 5th (East) | |
| 2010 | Joyce Compton | 11–40 | 1–27 | 5th (East) | |
| Joyce Compton: | | 951–486–3 (.661) | 182–204 (.472) | | |
Beverly Smith (SEC) (2011–2024)
| 2011 | Beverly Smith | 26–30 | 6–22 | 5th (East) | |
| 2012 | Beverly Smith | 23–32 | 3–25 | 5th (East) | |
| 2013 | Beverly Smith | 34–25 | 8–16 | 5th (East) | NCAA Regional |
| 2014 | Beverly Smith | 36–22 | 11–13 | 8th | NCAA Regional |
| 2015 | Beverly Smith | 38–22 | 10–14 | 9th | NCAA Regional |
| 2016 | Beverly Smith | 38–23 | 7–17 | 11th | NCAA Regional |
| 2017 | Beverly Smith | 34–25 | 8–15 | 10th | NCAA Regional |
| 2018 | Beverly Smith | 49–17 | 15–9 | 3rd | NCAA Super Regional |
| 2019 | Beverly Smith | 38–19 | 9–14 | 11th | NCAA Regional |
| 2020 | Beverly Smith | 17–6 | 1–2 | | Season canceled due to COVID-19 |
| 2021 | Beverly Smith | 26–26 | 4–20 | 13th | |
| 2022 | Beverly Smith | 26–30 | 3–21 | 13th | |
| 2023 | Beverly Smith | 40–22 | 9–15 | 10th | NCAA Regional |
| 2024 | Beverly Smith | 36–24 | 8–16 | T–11th | NCAA Regional |
| Beverly Smith: | | 461–323 (.588) | 102–219 (.318) | | |
Ashley Chastain (SEC) (2025–present)
| 2025 | Ashley Chastain | 44–17 | 13–11 | T–7th | NCAA Super Regional |
| 2026 | Ashley Chastain | 32–28 | 7–17 | 12th | NCAA Regional |
| 2027 | Ashley Chastain | 0–0 | 0–0 | | |
| Ashley Chastain: | | 76–45 (.628) | 20–28 (.417) | | |
| Total: | | 1,769–980–3 (.643) | 304–448–3 (.405) | | |
National champions College World Series participants Conference regular-season champion Conference regular-season and conference tournament champion Division regular-season champion Division regular-season and conference tournament champion Conference tournament champion

=== NCAA Tournament seeding history ===
National seeding began in 2005.

| Years → | '18 | '25 |
|---|---|---|
| Seeds → | 9 | 8 |

== South Carolina Gamecock's Louisville Slugger/NFCA All-Americans ==
| Player | Year(s) | Position | Team |
|---|---|---|---|
| Darlene Lowery | 1983, 1985 | Pitcher | 1st |
| Karen Sanchelli | 1987, 1988 | Catcher | 1st |
| Gretchen Koenig | 1988 | Pitcher | 2nd |
| Tricia Popowski | 1989, 1990, 1991 | Outfield | 1st, 2nd, 1st |
| Michelle Delloso | 1989, 1990, 1991 | Second Base | 1st, 1st, 2nd |
| Tiff Tootle | 1991, 1992, 1993 | Shortstop | 2nd, 1st, 3rd |
| Dana Fulmer | 1995 | Outfield | 2nd |
| Chanda Lee | 1996 | Outfield | 2nd |
| Trinity Johnson | 1995, 1996, 1997 | Pitcher | 3rd, 2nd, 1st |
| Tina Plew | 1995, 1997 | At-Large (C), Utility | 3rd |
| Kim Pietro | 1999 | Outfield | 1st |
| Megan Matthews | 1999 | Pitcher | 3rd |
| Alaynie Page | 2015 | At-Large/OF | 1st |
| Mackenzie Boesel | 2021 | At-Large/2B | 3rd |
| Alana Vawter | 2024 | At-Large/P | 3rd |

== See also ==
- List of NCAA Division I softball programs
