= 2025 Louisiana Ragin' Cajuns softball team =

American college softball season

2025 Louisiana Ragin' Cajuns softball
- Conference: Sun Belt Conference
- Record: 29–25 (14–10 SBC)
- Head coach: Alyson Habetz (1st season)
- Home stadium: Yvette Girouard Field at Lamson Park

2025 Sun Belt Conference softball standings
	Conf.				Overall
Team	W		L	PCT	W		L	PCT
Texas State ‍†‍‍	16	–	8	.667	34	–	19	.642
Marshall ‍‍‍	15	–	9	.625	31	–	23	.574
Louisiana–Monroe ‍‍‍	14	–	10	.583	35	–	22	.614
Louisiana ‍‍‍	14	–	10	.583	29	–	25	.537
Coastal Carolina ‍‍‡‍^{y}	13	–	11	.542	42	–	18	.700
Georgia Southern ‍‍‍	13	–	11	.542	29	–	25	.537
Appalachian State ‍‍‍	13	–	11	.542	23	–	27	.460
Troy ‍‍‍	12	–	12	.500	33	–	24	.579
James Madison ‍‍‍	11	–	13	.458	28	–	25	.528
Southern Miss ‍‍‍	10	–	13	.435	23	–	29	.442
South Alabama ‍‍‍	9	–	14	.391	20	–	31	.392
Georgia State ‍‍‍	3	–	21	.125	12	–	41	.226
† – Conference champion ‡ – Tournament champion y – Invited to the NCAA tournament As of May 17, 2025; Rankings from NFCA/USA Today

The 2025 Louisiana Ragin' Cajuns softball team represented the University of Louisiana at Lafayette during the 2025 NCAA Division I softball season. The Ragin' Cajuns played their home games at Yvette Girouard Field at Lamson Park and were led by first-year head coach Alyson Habetz. They were members of the Sun Belt Conference.

Following the 2024 season, Cajuns' head coach Gerry Glasco left to take on the head coaching position at Texas Tech, ultimately leading the 2025 Red Raiders to a national championship series, losing to Texas in the final. Habetz made her return to the Ragin' Cajuns after serving 25 years as an assistant/associate coach for Alabama under legendary head coach Patrick Murphy, where she helped lead the Tide to six SEC regular season titles, five SEC Tournament titles, 14 Women's College World Series appearances, and a national championship title in 2012. Habetz is an alum of the Ragin' Cajun softball program, where she was a part of the 1993 team that led the Cajuns to their first Women's College World Series appearance.

== Preseason ==
=== Sun Belt Conference Coaches Poll ===
The Sun Belt Conference Coaches Poll was released on January 29, 2025. Louisiana was picked to finish second in the conference with 131 votes and six first-place votes.

Coaches poll
Predicted finish	Team	Votes (1st place)
1	Texas State	134 (5)
2	Louisiana	131 (6)
3	South Alabama	106
4	Troy	103
5	James Madison	99 (1)
6	Coastal Carolina	94
7	Louisiana–Monroe	76
8	Georgia Southern	51
9	Marshall	50
10	Southern Miss	44
11	Appalachian State	33
12	Georgia State	13

=== Preseason All-Sun Belt team ===
- Bella Henzler, James Madison (Jr., C – Allison Park, Pa.)
- Georgia Hood, Coastal Carolina (So., 1B – Mount Gambier, Australia)
- Sam Roe, Louisiana (Sr., 1B – Destin, Fla.)
- Brooklyn Ulrich, Marshall (R-Jr., 2B – Mesa, Ariz.)
- Taylor McKinney, Troy (Sr., 2B – Montgomery, Ala.)
- Delaney Keith, Coastal Carolina (Jr., 3B – Nampa, Idaho)
- Cecilia Vasquez, Louisiana (Jr., SS – New Waverly, Texas)
- Meagan Brown, Louisiana–Monroe (So., OF – Katy, Texas)
- Reed Butler, James Madison (Gr., OF – Pomfret, Md.)
- Emma Davis, Georgia Southern (Jr., OF – Grayson, Ga.)
- Maddie Hayden, Louisiana (Sr., OF – West Monroe, La.)
- Ciara Trahan, Texas State (Sr., OF – Sante Fe, Texas)
- Payton List, James Madison (R-So., DP – Beaver, Pa.)
- Madison Azua, Texas State (So., P – Round Rock, Texas)
- Maddie Nichols, Louisiana–Monroe (Jr., P – West Monroe, La.)

== Personnel ==
2025 Louisiana Ragin' Cajuns softball team
Players
Coaches

#	Pos.	Name	Bats/throws	Height	Year	Home town
1	INF	Mia Liscano	L/R	5 ft 6 in (1.68 m)	So	Austin, Texas
2	INF	Brooke Otto	R/R	5 ft 5 in (1.65 m)	Jr	Smithville, Texas
3	OF	Maddie Hayden	L/R	5 ft 4 in (1.63 m)	Sr	West Monroe, Louisiana
4	OF	Erin Ardoin	L/R	5 ft 5 in (1.65 m)	Jr	Moss Bluff, Louisiana
5	P	Sam Ryan	R/R	5 ft 8 in (1.73 m)	Sr	Monroe, New York
6	P	Mallory Wheeler	R/R	6 ft 1 in (1.85 m)	Fr	Jensen Beach, Florida
7	OF	Dayzja Williams	L/L	5 ft 5 in (1.65 m)	So	Alexandria, Louisiana
8	OF	Chayne Allen	R/R	5 ft 3 in (1.6 m)	Fr	Cypress, Texas
9	INF	Cecilia Vasquez	R/R	5 ft 6 in (1.68 m)	Jr	New Waverly, Texas
10	C	Savannah White	R/R	5 ft 7 in (1.7 m)		Wickes, Arkansas
11	C	Mia Norwood	R/R	5 ft 2 in (1.57 m)	Fr	Stonewall, Louisiana
12	INF	Gabbie Stutes (redshirt)	L/R	5 ft 3 in (1.6 m)	Fr	Lafayette, Louisiana
14	INF	Raenna Liscano	R/R	5 ft 4 in (1.63 m)	Fr	Pearland, Texas
15	OF	Laney Credeur	L/R	5 ft 4 in (1.63 m)	Sr	Old Mines, Missouri
16	P	Lexie Delbrey	R/R	5 ft 6 in (1.68 m)	Sr	Bainbridge, Georgia
17	P	Sage Hoover	R/R	5 ft 7 in (1.7 m)	Jr	Edgewood, Texas
18	C	Sam Roe	R/R	5 ft 5 in (1.65 m)	Sr	Destin, Florida
20	OF	Lily Knox	R/R	5 ft 11 in (1.8 m)	Fr	Simi Valley, California
21	INF	Lillian Soto (redshirt)	R/R	5 ft 9 in (1.75 m)	Fr	Ruston, Louisiana
22	P	Tyra Clary	R/R	5 ft 8 in (1.73 m)	Sr	Reno, Nevada
23	INF	Emily Smith	R/R	5 ft 8 in (1.73 m)	Fr	Kountze, Texas
24	C	McKayla Ferguson	R/R	5 ft 5 in (1.65 m)	Jr	Plaquemine, Louisiana
29	OF	Kayla Falterman	L/R	5 ft 4 in (1.63 m)	Sr	The Woodlands, Texas
77	P	Bethany Noble	R/R	6 ft 1 in (1.85 m)	Jr	Amarillo, Texas

Head coach

Alyson Habetz (Louisiana)

Assistant coach(es)

Lacy Prejean (Alabama)

Legend

- (C) Team captain
- (S) Suspended
- (I) Ineligible
- Injured
- Current redshirt

Roster
Last update: 27 December 2025

== Schedule and results ==
Legend
	Louisiana win
	Louisiana loss
	Postponement/Cancellation
**Bold**	Louisiana team member

2025 Louisiana Ragin' Cajuns softball game log
Regular season (28–24)

February (10–4)
Date	Opponent	Rank	Site/stadium	Score	Win	Loss	Save	TV	Attendance	Overall record	SBC record
Louisiana Classics
Feb. 6	Seton Hall		Yvette Girouard Field at Lamson Park • Lafayette, LA	**L** 2–4	Carr (1–0)	**Clary** (0–1)	None	ESPN+	1,910	0–1	
Feb. 7	No. 1 Texas		Yvette Girouard Field at Lamson Park • Lafayette, LA	**L** 0–8^{5}	Kavan (1–0)	**Noble** (0–1)	None	ESPN+	2,511	0–2	
Feb. 8	Seton Hall		Yvette Girouard Field at Lamson Park • Lafayette, LA	**W** 9–1^{6}	**Ryan** (1–0)	Kreuscher (0–1)	None		1,955	1–2	
Feb. 8	George Mason		Yvette Girouard Field at Lamson Park • Lafayette, LA	**W** 9–1^{6}	**Clary** (1–1)	Tallman (0–2)	None		1,955	2–2	
Feb. 9	Longwood		Yvette Girouard Field at Lamson Park • Lafayette, LA	**W** 8–1	**Wheeler** (1–0)	Kirkland (1–2)	None	ESPN+	1,779	3–2	
Ragin' Cajun Invitational I
Feb. 14	Northern Illinois		Yvette Girouard Field at Lamson Park • Lafayette, LA	**W** 4–1	**Ryan** (2–0)	Cassell (0–3)	None		1,891	4–2	
Feb. 14	Ole Miss		Yvette Girouard Field at Lamson Park • Lafayette, LA	**W** 6–5^{9}	**Wheeler** (2–0)	Guachino (2–3)	None		1,891	5–2	
Feb. 15	Sam Houston		Yvette Girouard Field at Lamson Park • Lafayette, LA	**L** 2–8	Abke (2–2)	**Ryan** (2–1)	None		1,838	5–3	
Feb. 16	Central Arkansas		Yvette Girouard Field at Lamson Park • Lafayette, LA	**W** 9–1^{6}	**Wheeler** (3–0)	Petty (1–3)	None	ESPN+	1,937	6–3	
Feb. 16	Ole Miss		Yvette Girouard Field at Lamson Park • Lafayette, LA	**L** 0–5	Guachino (4–3)	**Noble** (0–2)	None	ESPN+	1,937	6–4	
Ragin' Cajun Invitation II
Feb. 22	Houston		Yvette Girouard Field at Lamson Park • Lafayette, LA	**W** 8–7	**Noble** (1–2)	Solis (2–1)	None	ESPN+	1,838	7–4	
Feb. 22	Kansas City		Yvette Girouard Field at Lamson Park • Lafayette, LA	**W** 9–2^{6}	**Ryan** (3–1)	Anderson (0–2)	None	ESPN+	1,838	8–4	
Feb. 23	Houston		Yvette Girouard Field at Lamson Park • Lafayette, LA	Game Canceled							
Feb. 23	Houston		Yvette Girouard Field at Lamson Park • Lafayette, LA	Game Canceled							
Jane B. Moore Memorial Invitational
Feb. 28	vs. Rutgers		Jane B. Moore Field • Auburn, AL	**W** 5–0	**Wheeler** (4–0)	Hoekstra (3–5)	None			9–4	
Feb. 28	vs. McNeese		Jane B. Moore Field • Auburn, AL	**W** 4–1	**Clary** (2–1)	Taylor (5–2)	None			10–4	

March (7–13)
Date	Opponent	Rank	Site/stadium	Score	Win	Loss	Save	TV	Attendance	Overall record	SBC record
Jane B. Moore Memorial Invitational
Mar. 1	Rutgers		Jane B. Moore Field • Auburn, AL	**W** 5–3	**Noble** (2–2)	Depew (0–1)	None			11–4	
Mar. 1	at No. 20 Auburn		Jane B. Moore Field • Auburn, AL	**L** 3–6	Rainey (3–0)	**Wheeler** (4–1)	Geurin (1)	SECN+		11–5	
Mar. 2	at No. 20 Auburn		Jane B. Moore Field • Auburn, AL	**L** 3–4	Geurin (12–0)	**Clary** (2–2)	None	SECN+	1,744	11–6	
Mar. 5	at No. 21 Mississippi State		Nusz Park • Starkville, MS	**L** 1–14^{5}	Chaffin (1–0)	**Noble** (2–3)	None	SECN+	397	11–7	
Spring Break Showdown
Mar. 7	vs. Iowa		Rhoads Stadium • Tuscaloosa, AL	**L** 2–4	Adams (11–1)	**Ryan** (3–2)	Tretton (1)		159	11–8	
Mar. 7	at No. 22 Alabama		Rhoads Stadium • Tuscaloosa, AL	**L** 0–3	Briski (6–5)	**Noble** (2–4)	None	SECN+	159	11–9	
Mar. 8	vs. Iowa		Rhoads Stadium • Tuscaloosa, AL	**W** 3–0	**Wheeler** (5–1)	Tretton (3–3)	None		101	12–9	
Mar. 8	at No. 22 Alabama		Rhoads Stadium • Tuscaloosa, AL	**W** 4–3	**Clary** (3–2)	Winstead (6–1)	None	SECN+	3,675	13–9	
Mar. 11	at No. 4 LSU		Tiger Park • Baton Rouge, LA	**L** 0–14^{5}	Heavener (7–1)	**Noble** (2–5)	None	SECN+	1,190	13–10	
Mar. 14	at Marshall		Dot Hicks Field • Huntington, WV	**L** 5–6	Feringa (3–4)	**Ryan** (3–3)	None	ESPN+	395	13–11	0–1
Mar. 14	at Marshall		Dot Hicks Field • Huntington, WV	**W** 7–1	**Noble** (3–5)	King (4–5)	None	ESPN+	457	14–11	1–1
Mar. 15	at Marshall		Dot Hicks Field • Huntington, WV	**L** 4–12^{6}	Feringa (4–4)	**Wheeler** (5–2)	None	ESPN+	355	14–12	1–2
Mar. 18	at McNeese		Joe Miller Field at Cowgirl Diamond • Lake Charles, LA	**L** 4–5	Williams (4–4)	**Ryan** (3–4)	Schexnayder (1)	ESPN+	852	14–13	
Mar. 21	Louisiana–Monroe		Yvette Girouard Field at Lamson Park • Lafayette, LA	**W** 5–3^{8}	**Clary** (4–2)	Lake (7–4)	None	ESPN+	1,899	15–13	2–2
Mar. 22	Louisiana–Monroe		Yvette Girouard Field at Lamson Park • Lafayette, LA	**W** 9–3	**Wheeler** (6–2)	Abrams (7–3)	None	ESPN+	1,865	16–13	3–2
Mar. 23	Louisiana–Monroe		Yvette Girouard Field at Lamson Park • Lafayette, LA	**L** 5–10	Nichols (8–4)	**Wheeler** (6–3)	None	ESPN+	1,797	16–14	3–3
Mar. 25	No. 3 LSU		Yvette Girouard Field at Lamson Park • Lafayette, LA	**L** 4–11	Heavener (9–1)	**Clary** (4–3)	None	ESPN+	2,801	16–15	
Mar. 28	at Coastal Carolina		St. John Stadium • Conway, SC	**L** 4–5	Picone (16–2)	**Clary** (4–4)	None	ESPN+	432	16–16	3–4
Mar. 29	at Coastal Carolina		St. John Stadium • Conway, SC	**L** 8–10	Henderson (9–4)	**Wheeler** (6–4)	None	ESPN+	422	16–17	3–5
Mar. 30	at Coastal Carolina		St. John Stadium • Conway, SC	**W** 9–5	**Wheeler** (7–4)	Metzger (1–1)	None	ESPN+	285	17–17	4–5

April (8–7)
Date	Opponent	Rank	Site/stadium	Score	Win	Loss	Save	TV	Attendance	Overall record	SBC record
Apr. 2	Louisiana Tech		Yvette Girouard Field at Lamson Park • Lafayette, LA	**W** 3–0	**Ryan** (4–4)	Floyd (16–7)	None	ESPN+	1,705	18–17	
Apr. 4	at Troy		Troy Softball Complex • Troy, AL	**L** 4–5^{8}	Money (3–4)	**Wheeler** (7–5)	None	ESPN+	345	18–18	4–6
Apr. 5	at Troy		Troy Softball Complex • Troy, AL	**L** 5–6	Holt (10–3)	**Wheeler** (7–6)	None	ESPN+	341	18–19	4–7
Apr. 5	at Troy		Troy Softball Complex • Troy, AL	**W** 4–1	**Noble** (4–5)	Money (3–5)	None	ESPN+	333	19–19	5–7
Apr. 8	at Louisiana Tech		Dr. Billy Bundrick Field • Ruston, LA	**L** 1–2	Johnson (4–2)	**Wheeler** (7–7)	Floyd (1)	ESPN+	384	19–20	
Apr. 11	James Madison		Yvette Girouard Field at Lamson Park • Lafayette, LA	**L** 0–1	List (7–5)	**Wheeler** (7–8)	None	ESPN+	1,743	19–21	5–8
Apr. 12	James Madison		Yvette Girouard Field at Lamson Park • Lafayette, LA	**L** 7–8	Fleet (9–5)	**Noble** (4–6)	None	ESPN+	1,802	19–22	5–9
Apr. 13	James Madison		Yvette Girouard Field at Lamson Park • Lafayette, LA	**W** 9–2	**Wheeler** (8–8)	List (7–6)	None	ESPN+	1,700	20–22	6–9
Apr. 17	South Alabama		Yvette Girouard Field at Lamson Park • Lafayette, LA	**W** 2–1^{8}	**Wheeler** (9–8)	Miller (6–9)	None	ESPN+	1,669	21–22	7–9
Apr. 18	South Alabama		Yvette Girouard Field at Lamson Park • Lafayette, LA	**W** 8–0^{6}	**Ryan** (5–4)	Coble (0–2)	None	ESPN+	1,767	22–22	8–9
Apr. 19	South Alabama		Yvette Girouard Field at Lamson Park • Lafayette, LA	**W** 3–0	**Clary** (5–4)	Cato (4–4)	None	ESPN+	1,776	23–22	9–9
Apr. 22	at No. 1 Texas A&M		Davis Diamond • College Station, TX	**L** 2–11^{5}	Sparks (8–1)	**Clary** (5–5)	None	SECN	1,767	23–23	
Apr. 25	at Texas State		Bobcat Softball Stadium • San Marcos, TX	**W** 5–4^{8}	**Clary** (6–5)	Strood (9–7)	None	ESPN+	671	24–23	10–9
Apr. 26	at Texas State		Bobcat Softball Stadium • San Marcos, TX	**L** 2–3	Strood (10–7)	**Ryan** (5–5)	None	ESPN+	787	24–24	10–10
Apr. 27	at Texas State		Bobcat Softball Stadium • San Marcos, TX	**W** 4–3	**Wheeler** (10–8)	Strood (10–8)	**Clary** (1)	ESPN+	771	25–24	11–10

May (3–0)
Date	Opponent	Rank	Site/stadium	Score	Win	Loss	Save	TV	Attendance	Overall record	SBC record
May 1	Southern Miss		Yvette Girouard Field at Lamson Park • Lafayette, LA	**W** 2–0	**Wheeler** (11–8)	Giardina (7–6)	None	ESPN+	1,730	26–24	12–10
May 2	Southern Miss		Yvette Girouard Field at Lamson Park • Lafayette, LA	**W** 1–0	**Ryan** (6–5)	Lee (9–11)	None	ESPN+	1,745	27–24	13–10
May 3	Southern Miss		Yvette Girouard Field at Lamson Park • Lafayette, LA	**W** 4–2	**Wheeler** (12–8)	Giardina (7–7)	**Clary** (2)	ESPN+	1,972	28–24	14–10

Postseason (1–1)

SBC Tournament (1–1)
Date	Opponent	(Seed)/Rank	Site/stadium	Score	Win	Loss	Save	TV	Attendance	Overall record	Tournament record
May 8	vs. (6) Appalachian State	(3)	Troy Softball Complex • Troy, AL	**W** 2–1	**Wheeler** (13–8)	Moshos (16–10)	None	ESPN+	252	29–24	1–0
May 9	vs. (7) Coastal Carolina	(3)	Yvette Girouard Field at Lamson Park • Lafayette, LA	**L** 1–6	Picone (27–9)	**Wheeler** (13–9)	None	ESPN+	113	29–25	1–1

Schedule source:

*Rankings are based on the team's current ranking in the NFCA/USA Softball poll.
