= 2010 Alabama Crimson Tide softball team =

American college softball season

2010 Alabama Crimson Tide softball

SEC Champions SEC Tournament Champions

SEC Tournament Championship, W, 5-4 vs. LSU
- Conference: Southeastern Conference
- West
- Record: 52-11 (23-4 SEC)
- Head coach: Patrick Murphy
- Assistant coach: Alyson Habetz
- Pitching coach: Vann Stuedeman
- Home stadium: Alabama Softball Complex

The 2010 Alabama Crimson Tide softball team was an American softball team, representing the University of Alabama for the 2010 NCAA softball season. The Crimson Tide played its home games at the Alabama Softball Complex. The 2010 club made the postseason for the 12th straight year.

== Previous season ==
The 2009 Crimson Tide went 52-9 overall and 21-6 in SEC play. They were named the #4 overall seed in the NCAA tournament, advanced to the semifinals of the Women's College World Series. Three Tide players were named All-Americans (center fielder Brittany Rogers, pitcher/firstbaseman Charlotte Morgan and pitcher Kelsi Dunne).

== Pre-season ==
The Tide returns 13 letterwinners from a team that equaled its longest stay at the Women's College World Series in program history last season. All-Americans Morgan and Dunne return to the fold to lead Alabama in the 2010 season. On January 16, 2010, the Crimson Tide held their first official practice.

== Schedule ==
Date	Time	Opponent	Rank^{#}	Site	Result	Attendance	Winning Pitcher	Losing Pitcher
February 13, 2010*	1:00 PM	#9 Missouri Tigers	#2	Alabama Softball Complex • Tuscaloosa, AL	L 1-2	2,243	C. Thomas	K. Dunne
February 13, 2010*	3:30 PM	#9 Missouri Tigers	#2	Alabama Softball Complex • Tuscaloosa, AL	W 9-0	2,243	C. Morgan	J. Hainey
February 14, 2010*	1:00 PM	#9 Missouri Tigers	#2	Alabama Softball Complex • Tuscaloosa, AL	L 0-9	2,022	C. Thomas	K. Dunne
February 16, 2010*	4:00 PM	South Alabama Jaguars	#9	Alabama Softball Complex • Tuscaloosa, AL	W 6-3	1,885	L. Sewell	B. Pligrim
Hatter Invitational
February 19, 2010*	10:00 AM	Rhode Island Rams	#9	Patricia Wilson Field • DeLand, FL	W 17-3	448	A. Locke	E. Szymanski
February 19, 2010*	12:30 PM	#14 Ohio State Buckeyes	#9	Patricia Wilson Field • DeLand, FL	W 5-3	617	K. Dunne	L. Bodeker
February 20, 2010*	10:00 AM	#14 Ohio State Buckeyes	#9	Patricia Wilson Field • DeLand, FL	W 5-4	728	K. Dunne	M. Miller
February 20, 2010*	3:00 PM	Stetson Hatters	#9	Patricia Wilson Field • DeLand, FL	W 1-0	971	L. Sewell	A. Lindsay
February 21, 2010*	9:00 AM	#14 Ohio State Buckeyes	#9	Patricia Wilson Field • DeLand, FL	W 7-1	339	K. Dunne	L. Bodeker
February 23, 2010*	6:30 PM	UAB Blazers	#9	UAB Softball Complex • Birmingham, AL	W 7-3	1,323	K. Dunne	A. Smith
NFCA Leadoff Classic
February 26, 2010*	12:30 PM	Maryland Terrapins	#9	South Commons Stadium • Columbus, GA	W 4-1	N/A	C. Morgan	K. Knight
February 26, 2010*	3:00 PM	Iowa Hawkeyes	#9	South Commons Stadium • Columbus, GA	W 5-4	N/A	K. Dunne	A. Zust
February 27, 2010*	12:30 AM	#4 Michigan Wolverines	#9	South Commons Stadium • Columbus, GA	W 10-6	N/A	L. Sewell	N. Nemitz
February 27, 2010*	3:00 PM	Nebraska Cornhuskers	#9	South Commons Stadium • Columbus, GA	W 11-3	N/A	A. Locke	A. Hagemann
February 28, 2010*	11:30 AM	UCF Knights	#9	South Commons Stadium • Columbus, GA	L 2-3	N/A	A. Cole	A. Locke
Easton Classic
March 5, 2010*	6:00 PM	#7 Michigan Wolverines	#8	Alabama Softball Complex • Tuscaloosa, AL	L 2-5	2,102	J. Taylor	K. Dunne
March 6, 2010*	1:30 PM	DePaul Blue Demons	#8	Alabama Softball Complex • Tuscaloosa, AL	W 8-0	1,990	L. Sewell	L. Dean
March 6, 2010*	4:00 PM	#7 Michigan Wolverines	#8	Alabama Softball Complex • Tuscaloosa, AL	L 2-4	2,321	J. Taylor	C. Morgan
March 7, 2010*	12:15 PM	DePaul Blue Demons	#8	Alabama Softball Complex • Tuscaloosa, AL	W 6-4	2,022	K. Dunne	B. Heteniak
March 9, 2010*	3:00 PM	Liberty Flames	#10	Alabama Softball Complex • Tuscaloosa, AL	W 10-7	1,854	A. Locke	T. Smith
March 13, 2010	12:00 PM	#6 Georgia Bulldogs	#10	UGA Softball Stadium • Athens, GA	L 0-3	1,489	E. Arevalo	K. Dunne
March 13, 2010	2:00 PM	#6 Georgia Bulldogs	#10	UGA Softball Stadium • Athens, GA	W 8-5	1,489	L. Sewell	K. Murphy
March 14, 2010	1:00 PM	#6 Georgia Bulldogs	#10	UGA Softball Stadium • Athens, GA	W 13-4	854	K. Dunne	E. Arevalo
March 16, 2010	12:30 PM	Kentucky Wildcats	#8	UK Softball Complex • Lexington, KY	W 7-2	201	K. Dunne	L. Bell
March 16, 2010	3:00 PM	Kentucky Wildcats	#8	UK Softball Complex • Lexington, KY	L 4-5	201	W. Riley	C. Morgan
March 18, 2010*	6:00 PM	FIU Golden Panthers	#8	Alabama Softball Complex • Tuscaloosa, AL	W 2-1	2,008	K. Dunne	K. Barrett
March 20, 2010	1:00 PM	South Carolina Gamecocks	#8	Alabama Softball Complex • Tuscaloosa, AL	W 8-0	2,418	K. Dunne	K. Goodwin
March 20, 2010	3:00 PM	South Carolina Gamecocks	#8	Alabama Softball Complex • Tuscaloosa, AL	W 8-2	2,418	L. Sewell	A. Chastain
March 21, 2010	1:30 PM	South Carolina Gamecocks	#8	Alabama Softball Complex • Tuscaloosa, AL	W 21-1	1,911	L. Sewell	K. Goodwin
March 24, 2010*	6:00 PM	UAB Blazers	#7	Alabama Softball Complex • Tuscaloosa, AL	W 6-2	2,060	K. Dunne	L. Webster
March 27, 2010	1:00 PM	#6 Florida Gators	#7	Alabama Softball Complex • Tuscaloosa, AL	W 10-4	2,723	K. Dunne	S. Brombacher
March 27, 2010	3:00 PM	#6 Florida Gators	#7	Alabama Softball Complex • Tuscaloosa, AL	L 5-7	2,948	S. Brombacher	L. Sewell
March 28, 2010	1:30 PM	#6 Florida Gators	#7	Alabama Softball Complex • Tuscaloosa, AL	L 9-11	2,392	E. Gammel	A. Locke
April 2, 2010	6:00 PM	Auburn Tigers	#8	Jane B. Moore Field • Auburn, AL	W 5-1	1,633	K. Dunne	A. Bunner
April 3, 2010	1:00 PM	Auburn Tigers	#8	Jane B. Moore Field • Auburn, AL	W 9-1	1,563	C. Morgan	A. Thompson
April 3, 2010	3:30 PM	Auburn Tigers	#8	Jane B. Moore Field • Auburn, AL	W 10-2	1,562	K. Dunne	J. Loree
April 7, 2010	5:00 PM	#14 LSU Tigers	#6	Alabama Softball Complex • Tuscaloosa, AL	W 3-1	2,366	K. Dunne	C. Trahan
April 7, 2010	7:00 PM	#14 LSU Tigers	#6	Alabama Softball Complex • Tuscaloosa, AL	W 4-3	2,366	K. Dunne	R. Fico
April 10, 2010*	1:00 PM	Northwestern Wildcats	#6	Alabama Softball Complex • Tuscaloosa, AL	W 12-1	2,362	K. Dunne	J. Smith
April 11, 2010*	1:00 PM	Northwestern Wildcats	#6	Alabama Softball Complex • Tuscaloosa, AL	W 11-1	2,191	K. Dunne	L. Delaney
April 13, 2010*	6:00 PM	MVSU Delta Devilettes	#5	MVSU Softball Complex • Itta Bena, MS	W 6-1	300	L. Sewell	L. Jansen
April 17, 2010	1:00 PM	Ole Miss Rebels	#5	Alabama Softball Complex • Tuscaloosa, AL	W 14-0	2,806	K. Dunne	B. Nye
April 17, 2010	3:00 PM	Ole Miss Rebels	#5	Alabama Softball Complex • Tuscaloosa, AL	W 8-3	2,806	C. Morgan	L. Perry
April 18, 2010	1:30 PM	Ole Miss Rebels	#5	Alabama Softball Complex • Tuscaloosa, AL	W 3-1	2,482	K. Dunne	B. Barnhill
April 20, 2010*	1:30 PM	Troy Trojans	#5	Alabama Softball Complex • Tuscaloosa, AL	W 12-2	2,118	A. Locke	A. Williams
April 24, 2010	1:00 PM	Arkansas Razorbacks	#5	Bogle Park • Fayetteville, AR	W 6-1	910	C. Morgan	L. McGuirt
April 24, 2010	3:00 PM	Arkansas Razorbacks	#5	Bogle Park • Fayetteville, AR	W 16-8	910	A. Locke	C. Cohen
April 25, 2010	1:00 PM	Arkansas Razorbacks	#5	Bogle Park • Fayetteville, AR	W 8-6	719	L. Sewell	K. Jones
April 28, 2010*	6:00 PM	#7 Georgia Tech Yellow Jackets	#4	Alabama Softball Complex • Tuscaloosa, AL	W 13-1	2,045	K. Dunne	H. Rush
May 1, 2010	1:00 PM	#16 Tennessee Lady Vols	#4	Alabama Softball Complex • Tuscaloosa, AL	W 4-2	2,542	K. Dunne	C. Hosfield
May 1, 2010	3:00 PM	#16 Tennessee Lady Vols	#4	Alabama Softball Complex • Tuscaloosa, AL	W 7-6	2,848	C. Morgan	I. Renfroe
May 2, 2010	1:00 PM	Tennessee Volunteers		Alabama Softball Complex • Tuscaloosa, AL		RAIN OUT		
May 8, 2010	1:00 PM	Mississippi State Bulldogs	#3	MSU Softball Field • Starkville, MS	W 10-1	976	K. Dunne	M. Flesher
May 8, 2010	3:00 PM	Mississippi State Bulldogs	#3	MSU Softball Field • Starkville, MS	W 8-2	976	C. Morgan	L. Dunlap
May 9, 2010	1:00 PM	Mississippi State Bulldogs	#3	MSU Softball Field • Starkville, MS	W 6-1	683	K. Dunne	S. Becker
SEC Tournament
May 13, 2010*	11:30 PM	Arkansas Razorbacks	#3	Bogle Park • Fayetteville, AR	W 9-0	1,125	K. Dunne	H. McLemore
May 14, 2010*	5:00 PM	#15 Tennessee Lady Vols	#3	Bogle Park • Fayetteville, AR	W 4-3	906	K. Dunne	C. Hosfield
May 15, 2010*	6:30 PM	#11 Tennessee Lady Vols	#3	Bogle Park • Fayetteville, AR	W 5-4	1,510	K. Dunne	R. Fico
NCAA Tuscaloosa Regional
May 15, 2010*	6:00 PM	Alcorn St. Lady Braves	#3	Alabama Softball Complex • Tuscaloosa, AL	W 9-0	2,323	L. Sewell	J. Hatch
May 22, 2010*	1:30 PM	Lipscomb Bisons	#3	Alabama Softball Complex • Tuscaloosa, AL	W 5-2	2,439	K. Dunne	W. Kiihnl
May 23, 2010*	1:30 PM	Lipscomb Bisons	#3	Alabama Softball Complex • Tuscaloosa, AL	W 6-0	2,170	K. Dunne	W. Kiihnl
NCAA Tuscaloosa Super Regional
May 29, 2010*	11:00 AM	#19 Hawai'i Rainbow Wahine	#3	Alabama Softball Complex • Tuscaloosa, AL	W 8-0	2,918	K. Dunne	S. Ricketts
May 29, 2010*	1:30 PM	#19 Hawai'i Rainbow Wahine	#3	Alabama Softball Complex • Tuscaloosa, AL	L 7-8	3,218	S. Ricketts	K. Dunne
May 30, 2010*	Noon	#19 Hawai'i Rainbow Wahine	#3	Alabama Softball Complex • Tuscaloosa, AL	L 4-5	3,130	S. Ricketts	K. Dunne
*Non-Conference Game. ^{#}Rankings from NFCA released prior to game.All times are in Central Time Zone.

== Ranking Movement ==
Poll	Last	Pre	Wk 1	Wk 2	Wk 3	Wk 4	Wk 5	Wk 6	Wk 7	Wk 8	Wk 9	Wk 10	Wk 11	Wk 12	Wk 13	Wk 14	Final
NFCA	3	2	9	9	8	10	8	7	8	6							
USA Softball	3	2	8	7	6	7	5	5	6	7							
