= 2012 Alabama Crimson Tide softball team =

American college softball season

2012 Alabama Crimson Tide softball

National Champions W, 2–1 (Series) vs. Oklahoma

SEC regular-season champions SEC tournament championship, W, 10–1 vs. Florida
- Conference: Southeastern Conference
- West
- Record: 60–8 (23–5 SEC)
- Head coach: Patrick Murphy
- Assistant coach: Alyson Habetz
- Pitching coach: Stephanie VanBrakle
- Home stadium: Rhoads Stadium

The 2012 Alabama Crimson Tide softball team was an American softball team, representing the University of Alabama for the 2012 NCAA softball season. The Crimson Tide played its home games at Rhoads Stadium. The 2012 team made the postseason for the 14th straight year, and the Women's College World Series for eighth time. This season represented the 16th season of softball in the school's history. Alabama won its first softball National Championship, defeating Oklahoma in three games. They became the first team in the Southeastern Conference to win the Women's College World Series.

== Roster ==
2012 Alabama Crimson Tide roster
Pitchers: 11 Lauren Sewell – Junior; 23 Leslie Jury – Freshman; 33 Jackie Traina – Sophomore; Outfielders: 1 Kayla Braud – Junior; 2 Jazlyn Lunceford – Senior; 3 Keima Davis – Junior; 7 Jennifer Fenton – Senior; Utility: 17 Jadyn Spencer – Freshman; 18 Cassie Reilly-Boccia – Senior; 22 Amanda Locke – Senior	Catchers: 6 Jordan Patterson – Sophomore; 12 Kendall Dawson – Senior; 21 Chaunsey Bell – Freshman; 24 Olivia Gibson – Senior; Infielders: 4 Jackey Branham – Junior; 9 Courtney Conley – Junior; 10 Kaila Hunt – Sophomore; 15 Danae Hays – Freshman; 19 Danielle Richard – Freshman; 32 Ryan Iamurri – Sophomore; 18 Cassie Reilly-Boccia-Senior

2012 Alabama Crimson Tide Softball Roster

== Schedule ==
Date	Time	Opponent	Rank^{#}	Site	Result	Attendance	Winning Pitcher	Losing Pitcher
Mardi Gras Invitational
February 10*	3:00 PM	Memphis Tigers	#3	Jaguar Park • Mobile, AL	W 8–0^{(5)}	–	J. Traina	C. Hummel
February 11*	3:00 PM	Lipscomb Bisons	#3	Jaguar Park • Mobile, AL	W 15–4^{(6)}	–	L. Jury	W. Kiihnl
February 11*	5:30 PM	South Alabama Jaguars	#3	Jaguar Park • Mobile, AL	W 12–1^{(5)}	900	J. Traina	H. Campbell
February 12*	2:30 PM	Jacksonville State Gamecocks	#3	Jaguar Park • Mobile, AL	W 3–0	682	J. Traina	H. Phillips
SEC/ACC/Big 12 Challenge
February 17*	5:30 PM	#23 Georgia Tech Yellow Jackets	#2	Moore Field • Auburn, AL	W 12–9	–	J. Traina	L. Anderson
February 18*	10:00 AM	Virginia Tech Hokies	#2	Moore Field • Auburn, AL	W 7–3	500	L. Jury	J. Harrell
February 18*	12:30 PM	#4 Oklahoma Sooners	#2	Moore Field • Auburn, AL	Canceled			
February 19*	9:00 AM	#15 Oklahoma State Cowboys	#2	Moore Field • Auburn, AL	W 3–1	482	J. Traina	S. Freeman
February 21*	6:00 PM	UAB Blazers	#2	UAB Softball Field • Birmingham, AL	W 8–1	250	J. Traina	A. Torres
Easton Bama Bash Presented by DRASH
February 24*	4:00 PM	East Carolina Pirates	#2	Rhoads Stadium • Tuscaloosa, AL	W 4–2	1,199	L. Sewell	C. Smith
February 24*	6:00 PM	North Dakota State Bison	#2	Rhoads Stadium • Tuscaloosa, AL	W 9–4	1,199	L. Jury	K. Menke
February 25*	1:30 PM	East Carolina Pirates	#2	Rhoads Stadium • Tuscaloosa, AL	W 9–4	1,427	L. Jury	S. Christian
February 25*	4:00 PM	North Dakota State Bison	#2	Rhoads Stadium • Tuscaloosa, AL	W 3–2	1,427	J. Traina	W. Johnson
February 26*	1:30 PM	SIUE Cougars	#2	Rhoads Stadium • Tuscaloosa, AL	W 8–0^{(5)}	2,423	L. Sewell	L. Coleman
Alabama Invite
March 2*	6:30 PM	Maryland Terrapins	#1	Rhoads Stadium • Tuscaloosa, AL	W 19–1^{(5)}	2,184	J. Traina	K. Knight
March 3*	1:30 PM	UMass Minutewomen	#1	Rhoads Stadium • Tuscaloosa, AL	W 8–0^{(6)}	1,344	J. Traina	S. Plourde
March 3*	4:00 PM	Maryland Terrapins	#1	Rhoads Stadium • Tuscaloosa, AL	W 9–1	1,344	L. Jury	K. Knight
March 4*	1:30 PM	UAB Blazers	#1	Rhoads Stadium • Tuscaloosa, AL	W 4–1	2,446	J. Traina	L. Campbell
March 7*	6:00 PM	Samford Bulldogs	#1	Rhoads Stadium • Tuscaloosa, AL	W 7–3	2,377	L. Jury	M. Alridge
March 9	5:00 PM	Kentucky Wildcats	#1	UK Softball Complex • Lexington, Ky.	W 3–1^{(9)}	1,063	J. Traina	C. Bell
March 10	2:00 PM	Kentucky Wildcats	#1	UK Softball Complex • Lexington, Ky.	W 9–1^{(5)}	1,246	L. Jury	L. Cumbess
March 11	12:00 PM	Kentucky Wildcats	#1	UK Softball Complex • Lexington, Ky.	W 12–2^{(6)}	1,402	J. Traina	C. Bell
March 13*	7:00 PM	#18 Oregon Ducks	#1	Howe Field • Eugene, OR	W 5–1	600	J. Traina	J. Moore
March 14*	8:00 PM	Portland State Vikings	#1	Lind Stadium • Portland, OR	Canceled			
March 16	6:30 PM	Ole Miss Rebels	#1	Rhoads Stadium • Tuscaloosa, AL	W 12–2^{(5)}	2,812	J. Traina	K. Bruning
March 17	1:30 PM	Ole Miss Rebels	#1	Rhoads Stadium • Tuscaloosa, AL	W 10–7	3,261	A. Locke	K. Bruning
March 18	1:30 PM	Ole Miss Rebels	#1	Rhoads Stadium • Tuscaloosa, AL	W 12–1^{(5)}	2,681	J. Traina	E. Jayjohn
March 21	4:00 PM	#12 Tennessee Volunteers	#1	Rhoads Stadium • Tuscaloosa, AL	W 3–2^{(11)}	–	J. Traina	I. Renfroe
March 21	6:30 PM	#12 Tennessee Volunteers	#1	Rhoads Stadium • Tuscaloosa, AL	L 5–2	3,135	E. Renfroe	L. Jury
Easton Alabama Challenge
March 23*	6:00 PM	#25 DePaul Blue Demons	#1	Rhoads Stadium • Tuscaloosa, AL	W 4–3	2,367	A. Locke	K. Verdun
March 24*	1:30 PM	#25 DePaul Blue Demons	#1	Rhoads Stadium • Tuscaloosa, AL	W 9–7	1,463	J. Traina	B. Brown
March 24*	4:00 PM	Longwood Lancers	#1	Rhoads Stadium • Tuscaloosa, AL	W 11–0^{(5)}	–	L. Jury	L. Morris
March 25*	12:30 PM	Longwood Lancers	#1	Rhoads Stadium • Tuscaloosa, AL	W 7–2	2,360	L. Jury	A. Cornell
March 27	4:00 PM	#24 Auburn Tigers	#2	Moore Field • Auburn, AL	W 4–2	1,822	J. Traina	L. Schmalz
March 27	6:30 PM	#24 Auburn Tigers	#2	Moore Field • Auburn, AL	W 5–2	1,806	J. Traina	J. Loree
March 30	7:00 PM	Mississippi State Bulldogs	#2	MSU Softball Field • Starkville, MS	W 5–4	461	J. Traina	S. Becker
March 31	1:00 PM	Mississippi State Bulldogs	#2	MSU Softball Field • Starkville, MS	W 4–2	509	L. Jury	K. Vry
April 1	1:00 PM	Mississippi State Bulldogs	#2	MSU Softball Field • Starkville, MS	W 9–3	316	J. Traina	S. Becker
April 6	6:30 PM	#24 LSU Tigers	#2	Rhoads Stadium • Tuscaloosa, AL	W 6–0	3,266	J. Traina	B. Mack
April 7	1:30 PM	#24 LSU Tigers	#2	Rhoads Stadium • Tuscaloosa, AL	L 2–3	3,521	R. Fico	L. Jury
April 8	1:30 PM	#24 LSU Tigers	#2	Rhoads Stadium • Tuscaloosa, AL	W 6–0	2,684	J. Traina	B. Mack
April 13	6:30 PM	South Carolina Gamecocks	#2	Rhoads Stadium • Tuscaloosa, AL	W 9–1^{(5)}	3,265	J. Traina	K. White
April 14	1:30 PM	South Carolina Gamecocks	#2	Rhoads Stadium • Tuscaloosa, AL	W 7–5	3,940	J. Traina	A. Broyles
April 15	1:30 PM	South Carolina Gamecocks	#2	Rhoads Stadium • Tuscaloosa, AL	W 19–4^{(5)}	3,250	J. Traina	K. Howser
April 18*	6:00 PM	Georgia State Panthers	#2	Rhoads Stadium • Tuscaloosa, AL	L 1–5	2,253	K. Medlam	L. Jury
April 20	5:30 PM	#12 Georgia Bulldogs	#2	Turner Stadium • Athens, GA	L 4–7	864	E. Arevalo	J. Traina
April 21	1:30 PM	#12 Georgia Bulldogs	#2	Turner Stadium • Athens, GA	W 8–3	1,378	J. Traina	M. Montemayor
April 22	12:30 PM	#12 Georgia Bulldogs	#2	Turner Stadium • Athens, GA	W 6–4	1,804	A. Locke	E. Arevalo
April 25*	6:00 PM	Troy Trojans	#4	Rhoads Stadium • Tuscaloosa, AL	W 12–0^{(5)}	2,726	L. Jury	A. Rainey
April 27	7:00 PM	Arkansas Razorbacks	#4	Bogle Park • Fayetteville, AR	W 13–6	683	J. Traina	L. Cohen
April 28	1:00 PM	Arkansas Razorbacks	#4	Bogle Park • Fayetteville, AR	L 1–8	1,094	J. Beasley	A. Locke
April 29	1:00 PM	Arkansas Razorbacks	#4	Bogle Park • Fayetteville, AR	W 5–1	844	J. Traina	J. Beasley
May 4	6:30 PM	#6 Florida Gators	#3	Rhoads Stadium • Tuscaloosa, AL	L 1–4	3,248	H. Rogers	J. Traina
May 5	1:30 PM	#6 Florida Gators	#3	Rhoads Stadium • Tuscaloosa, AL	W 9–1^{(5)}	3,640	J. Traina	H. Rogers
May 6	1:30 PM	#6 Florida Gators	#3	Rhoads Stadium • Tuscaloosa, AL	W 5–3	3,659	J. Traina	H. Rogers
May 7*	5:00 PM	Fordham Rams	#3	Murphy Field • Bronx, NY	L 5–8	937	K. Pirone	L. Jury
SEC tournament
May 10	7:00 PM	Mississippi State Bulldogs	#3	Rhoads Stadium • Tuscaloosa, AL	W 5–2	2,691	J. Traina	K. Vry
May 11	4:30 PM	#11 Georgia Bulldogs	#3	Rhoads Stadium • Tuscaloosa, AL	W 1–0	2,589	J. Traina	E. Arevalo
May 12	1:30 PM	#7 Florida Gators	#3	Rhoads Stadium • Tuscaloosa, AL	W 10–1^{(5)}	2,672	A. Locke	L. Haeger
NCAA Tuscaloosa Regional
May 18*	6:00 PM	Tennessee Tech Eagles	#3	Rhoads Stadium • Tuscaloosa, AL	W 5–1	2,060	A. Locke	C. Jones
May 19*	1:00 PM	South Alabama Jaguars	#3	Rhoads Stadium • Tuscaloosa, AL	W 5–2	2,040	J. Traina	H. Campbell
May 20*	1:00 PM	South Alabama Jaguars	#3	Rhoads Stadium • Tuscaloosa, AL	W 6–0	2,093	J. Traina	H. Campbell
NCAA Tuscaloosa Super Regional
May 24*	7:00 PM	#21 Michigan Wolverines	#3	Rhoads Stadium • Tuscaloosa, AL	W 4–1	2,475	J. Traina	H. Wagner
May 25*	3:30 PM	#21 Michigan Wolverines	#3	Rhoads Stadium • Tuscaloosa, AL	W 4–3	2,557	J. Traina	H. Wagner
Women's College World Series
May 31*	6:00 PM	#5 Tennessee Volunteers	#3	ASA Hall of Fame Stadium • Oklahoma City, OK	W 5–3	8,235	J. Traina	I. Renfroe
June 1*	8:30 PM	#2 Arizona State Sun Devils	#3	ASA Hall of Fame Stadium • Oklahoma City, OK	W 2–1	9,209	J. Traina	D. Escobedo
June 3*	2:30 PM	#1 Cal Golden Bears	#3	ASA Hall of Fame Stadium • Oklahoma City, OK	W 5–2	9,167	J. Traina	J. Henderson
June 4*	7:00 PM	#4 Oklahoma Sooners	#3	ASA Hall of Fame Stadium • Oklahoma City, OK	L 1–4	8,197	K. Ricketts	J. Traina
June 5*	7:00 PM	#4 Oklahoma Sooners	#3	ASA Hall of Fame Stadium • Oklahoma City, OK	W 8–6	8,385	J. Traina	K. Ricketts
June 6*	7:00 PM	#4 Oklahoma Sooners	#3	ASA Hall of Fame Stadium • Oklahoma City, OK	W 5–4	6,804	J. Traina	K. Ricketts
*Non-Conference Game. ^{#}Rankings from NFCA released prior to game.All times are in Central Time Zone.

== Ranking movement ==
Poll	Pre	Wk 1	Wk 2	Wk 3	Wk 4	Wk 5	Wk 6	Wk 7	Wk 8	Wk 9	Wk 10	Wk 11	Wk 12	Wk 13	Wk 14	Final
NFCA	3	2	2	1	1	1	2	2	2	2	2	4	3	3	3	1
USA Softball	2	2	2	2	2	1	2	2	2	2	2	3	4	3	3	1

== Awards and honors ==
- Patrick Murphy

SEC Coach of the Year
NFCA South Region Coaching Staff of the Year (Along with Alyson Habetz, Stephanie VanBrakle, Adam Arbor, Kate Harris & Whitney Larsen)
NFCA Division I National Coaching Staff of the Year (Along with Alyson Habetz, Stephanie VanBrakle, Adam Arbor, Kate Harris & Whitney Larsen))

- Cassie Reilly-Boccia

Preseason All-SEC team
Second Team All-SEC
SEC All-Defensive Team
Lowe's Senior CLASS Award; Finalist

- Kayla Braud

Preseason All-SEC team
USA Softball Player of the Year; Top 25 Finalist
Second Team All-SEC
WCWS All Tournament Team

- Kendall Dawson

Second Team All-SEC
SEC All-Defensive Team

- Jennifer Fenton

SEC Player of the Week; March 19
First Team All-SEC
SEC Scholar-Athlete of the Year
NFCA Third Team All-American
Easton NCAA Division I Second Team All-American
WCWS All Tournament Team

- Kaila Hunt

SEC Softball Player of the Week; April 2
First Team All-SEC
NFCA Second Team All American
Easton NCAA Division I First Team All-American

- Amanda Locke

Preseason All-SEC team
SEC Softball Player of the Week; February 13 & April 23
Second Team All-SEC
NFCA Second Team All-American
Easton NCAA Division I First Team All-American
WCWS All Tournament Team

- Jazlyn Lunceford

Second Team All-SEC
SEC All-Defensive Team

- Jackie Traina

Preseason All-SEC team
USA Softball Player of the Year; Top 10 Finalist
SEC Pitcher of the Week; March 19, April 2 & April 9
First Team All-SEC
SEC Pitcher of the Year
NFCA First Team All-American
Easton NCAA Division I First Team All-American
WCWS Most Valuable Player

== See also ==
- 2012 Alabama Crimson Tide baseball team
