= 2010 Florida Gators softball team =

American college softball season

2010 Florida Gators softball
- Conference: Southeastern Conference
- East
- Record: 49-10 (20-4 SEC)
- Head coach: Tim Walton
- Assistant coach: Jennifer Rocha, Jenny Gladding
- Home stadium: Katie Seashole Pressly Softball Stadium

The 2010 Florida Gators softball team represented the University of Florida softball program for the 2010 NCAA softball season.

== Previous season ==
The 2009 Gators went 63-5 overall and 26-1 in SEC play. They were named the #1 overall seed in the NCAA tournament for the second straight year, advanced to the championship series of the Women's College World Series. They also were the SEC regular season and tournament champions. Five Gators were named All-Americans (Stacey Nelson, Stephanie Brombacher, Aja Paculba, Francesca Enea, and Kelsey Bruder) and Senior pitcher Stacey Nelson was again named the SEC Pitcher of the Year.

== Pre-season ==
The Gators returned 10 members from the 2009 squad and added 7 freshmen. All-time Florida home run leader Francesca Enea and undefeated right-handed pitcher Stephanie Brombacher returned to lead the team. The SEC Media selected Florida to win the SEC East and finish second to Alabama for the conference title. Brombacher, Bruder, Enea, and Paculba were voted to the pre-season All-SEC team.

== Schedule ==
Date	Time	Opponent	Rank^{#}	Site	Result	Attendance	Winning Pitcher	Losing Pitcher
USF Wilson-DeMarini Tournament
Feb 13, 2010*	12:00 PM	@ East Carolina Pirates	#3	Eddie C Moore Complex - Field 9 • Clearwater, FL	W 4-3	Unknown	Ensley Gammel	Faith Sutton
Feb 13, 2010*	3:00 PM	#13 Georgia Tech Yellow Jackets	#3	Eddie C Moore Complex - Field 9 • Clearwater, FL	L 0-3	Unknown	Hope Rush	Stephanie Brombacher
Feb 14, 2010*	1:30 PM	South Florida Bulls	#3	Eddie C Moore Complex - Field 8 • Clearwater, FL	W 12-8	Unknown	Stephanie Brombacher	Kristen Gordon
Feb 14, 2010*	3:30 PM	@ Long Island Blackbirds	#3	Eddie C Moore Complex - Field 9 • Clearwater, FL	W 7-2	Unknown	Stephanie Brombacher	Sarah Reynolds
Feb 17, 2010*	5:00 PM	Jacksonville Dolphins	#3	Katie Seashole Pressly Softball Stadium • Gainesville, FL	W 6-1	786	Stephanie Brombacher	Ashley Iveson
Lipton Invitational
Feb 19, 2010*	3:45 PM	@ Campbell Fighting Camels	#3	Katie Seashole Pressly Softball Stadium • Gainesville, FL	W 7-0	657	Stephanie Brombacher	Christina Melton
Feb 19, 2010*	6:00 PM	Kansas Jayhawks	#3	Katie Seashole Pressly Softball Stadium • Gainesville, FL	W 12-4 (6)	657	Erin Schuppert	Sarah Vertelka
Feb 20, 2010*	12:15 PM	Marshall Thundering Herd	#3	Katie Seashole Pressly Softball Stadium • Gainesville, FL	W 8-0 (5)	1401	Stephanie Brombacher	Katie Murphree
Feb 20, 2010*	2:30 PM	@ East Carolina Pirates	#3	Katie Seashole Pressly Softball Stadium • Gainesville, FL	W 4-3	1401	Stephanie Brombacher	Faith Sutton
Feb 21, 2010*	12:15 PM	East Carolina Pirates	#3	Katie Seashole Pressly Softball Stadium • Gainesville, FL	W 1-0	982	Stephanie Brombacher	Toni Paisley
Feb 27, 2010*	1:00 PM	Northwestern State Demons	#3	Katie Seashole Pressly Softball Stadium • Gainesville, FL	W 15-0 (5)	743	Stephanie Brombacher	Kelee Grimes
Feb 27, 2010*	3:30 PM	Northwestern State Demons	#3	Katie Seashole Pressly Softball Stadium • Gainesville, FL	W 5-0	743	Stephanie Brombacher	Kylie Roos
Feb 28, 2010*	12:00 PM	Northwestern State Demons	#3	Katie Seashole Pressly Softball Stadium • Gainesville, FL	W 10-1 (5)	979	Stephanie Brombacher	Kylie Roos
DeMarini Tournament
Mar 5, 2010*	12:00 PM	@ Pacific Tigers	#4	Anderson Family Field 2 • Fullerton, CA	W 12-3 (5)	Unknown	Ensley Gammel	Nikki Armagost
Mar 5, 2010*	4:30 PM	#9 Stanford Cardinal	#4	Anderson Family Field 1 • Fullerton, CA	L 0-2	Unknown	Teagan Gerhart	Stephanie Brombacher
Mar 6, 2010*	4:30 PM	Cal State Fullerton Titans	#4	Anderson Family Field 1 • Fullerton, CA	W 12-0 (5)	Unknown	Stephanie Brombacher	Katey Laban
Mar 7, 2010*	12:00 PM	@ UC Davis Aggies	#4	Anderson Family Field 2 • Fullerton, CA	W 14-3 (5)	Unknown	Stephanie Brombacher	Dana Waldusky
Mar 7, 2010*	4:30 PM	Loyola Marymount Lions	#4	Anderson Family Field 2 • Fullerton, CA	W 13-1 (5)	Unknown	Ensley Gammel	Molly Medeiros
Mar 10, 2010	3:00 PM	@ #6 Georgia Bulldogs	#4	University of Georgia Softball Complex • Athens, GA	Canceled			
Mar 10, 2010	5:30 PM	@ #6 Georgia Bulldogs	#4	University of Georgia Softball Complex • Athens, GA	Canceled			
Mar 13, 2010	1:00 PM	Ole Miss Rebels	#6	Katie Seashole Pressly Softball Stadium • Gainesville, FL	W 12-2 (5)	1313	Stephanie Brombacher	Becky Nye
Mar 13, 2010	3:30 PM	Ole Miss Rebels	#6	Katie Seashole Pressly Softball Stadium • Gainesville, FL	L 4-6 (8)	1313	Brittany Barnhill	Stephanie Brombacher
Mar 14, 2010	12:00 PM	Ole Miss Rebels	#6	Katie Seashole Pressly Softball Stadium • Gainesville, FL	W 5-3	784	Stephanie Brombacher	Brittany Barnhill
Mar 17, 2010	4:00 PM	Auburn Tigers	#6	Katie Seashole Pressly Softball Stadium • Gainesville, FL	W 7-0	847	Stephanie Brombacher	Angel Bunner
Mar 17, 2010	6:30 PM	Auburn Tigers	#6	Katie Seashole Pressly Softball Stadium • Gainesville, FL	W 5-4	847	Stephanie Brombacher	Angel Bunner
Mar 20, 2010*	3:00 PM	@ Baylor Bears	#6	Getterman Stadium • Waco, TX	Canceled			
Mar 20, 2010*	5:30 PM	@ Baylor Bears	#6	Getterman Stadium • Waco, TX	Canceled			
Mar 21, 2010*	1:00 PM	@ Baylor Bears	#6	Getterman Stadium • Waco, TX	Canceled			
Mar 25, 2010*	6:00 PM	South Florida Bulls	#6	Katie Seashole Pressly Softball Stadium • Gainesville, FL	W 10-0	713	Stephanie Brombacher	Kristen Gordon
Mar 27, 2010	2:00 PM	@ #7 Alabama Crimson Tide	#6	Alabama Softball Complex • Tuscaloosa, AL	L 4-10	2948	Kelsi Dunne	Stephanie Brombacher
Mar 27, 2010	4:30 PM	@ #7 Alabama Crimson Tide	#6	Alabama Softball Complex • Tuscaloosa, AL	W 7-5 (8)	2948	Stephanie Brombacher	Lauren Sewell
Mar 28, 2010	2:30 PM	@ #7 Alabama Crimson Tide	#6	Alabama Softball Complex • Tuscaloosa, AL	W 11-9	2392	Ensley Gammel	Amanda Locke
Mar 31, 2010*	7:00 PM	@ UCF Knights	#6	UCF Softball Complex • Orlando, FL	W 4-3 (9)	1091	Ensley Gammel	Ashleigh Cole
Apr 3, 2010	1:00 PM	#12 LSU Tigers	#6	Katie Seashole Pressly Softball Stadium • Gainesville, FL	W 4-1	2433	Stephanie Brombacher	Kirsten Shortridge
Apr 3, 2010	3:30 PM	#12 LSU Tigers	#6	Katie Seashole Pressly Softball Stadium • Gainesville, FL	W 2-1	2433	Ensley Gammel	Cody Trahan
Apr 4, 2010	12:00 PM	#12 LSU Tigers	#6	Katie Seashole Pressly Softball Stadium • Gainesville, FL	W 7-1	1043	Ensley Gammel	Rachel Fico
Apr 10, 2010	2:00 PM	@ Arkansas Razorbacks	#4	Bogle Park • Fayetteville, AR	W 9-5	902	Stephanie Brombacher	Hope McLemore
Apr 10, 2010	4:30 PM	@ Arkansas Razorbacks	#4	Bogle Park • Fayetteville, AR	W 12-3 (5)	902	Ensley Gammel	Layne McGuirt
Apr 11, 2010	2:00 PM	@ Arkansas Razorbacks	#4	Bogle Park • Fayetteville, AR	W 6-1	657	Ensley Gammel	Hope McLemore
Apr 14, 2010*	6:00 PM	@ Florida State Seminoles		JoAnne Graf Field • Tallahassee, FL				
Apr 17, 2010	1:00 PM	Kentucky Wildcats		Katie Seashole Pressly Softball Stadium • Gainesville, FL				
Apr 17, 2010	3:30 PM	Kentucky Wildcats		Katie Seashole Pressly Softball Stadium • Gainesville, FL				
Apr 18, 2010	12:00 PM	Kentucky Wildcats		Katie Seashole Pressly Softball Stadium • Gainesville, FL				
Apr 20, 2010*	4:00 PM	FIU Golden Panthers		Katie Seashole Pressly Softball Stadium • Gainesville, FL				
Apr 23, 2010	5:00 PM	@ Tennessee Volunteers		Sherri Parker Lee Softball Stadium • Knoxville, TN				
Apr 23, 2010	7:30 PM	@ Tennessee Volunteers		Sherri Parker Lee Softball Stadium • Knoxville, TN				
Apr 24, 2010	1:00 PM	@ Tennessee Volunteers		Sherri Parker Lee Softball Stadium • Knoxville, TN				
May 1, 2010	2:00 PM	@ Mississippi State Bulldogs		MSU Softball Field • Starkville, MS				
May 1, 2010	4:30 PM	@ Mississippi State Bulldogs		MSU Softball Field • Starkville, MS				
May 2, 2010	1:00 PM	@ Mississippi State Bulldogs		MSU Softball Field • Starkville, MS				
May 5, 2010*	4:00 PM	North Florida Ospreys		Katie Seashole Pressly Softball Stadium • Gainesville, FL				
May 5, 2010*	6:30 PM	North Florida Ospreys		Katie Seashole Pressly Softball Stadium • Gainesville, FL				
May 8, 2010	1:00 PM	South Carolina Gamecocks		Katie Seashole Pressly Softball Stadium • Gainesville, FL				
May 8, 2010	3:30 PM	South Carolina Gamecocks		Katie Seashole Pressly Softball Stadium • Gainesville, FL				
May 9, 2010	12:00 PM	South Carolina Gamecocks		Katie Seashole Pressly Softball Stadium • Gainesville, FL				
SEC tournament
May 13–15, 2010				Bogle Park • Fayetteville, AR				
NCAA tournament
May 20-Jun 9, 2010								
*Non-Conference Game. ^{#}Rankings from NFCA released prior to game.All times are in Eastern Time Zone.

== Game notes ==
=== East Carolina (USF Wilson-DeMarini Tournament) ===
	1	2	3	4	5	6	7	R	H	E
Pirates	0	0	0	1	2	0	0	3	5	0
Gators	0	1	2	1	0	0	X	4	5	0

In the Gators' opening game of the 2010 season, three homers scored all four of their runs. Kelsey Bruder, Francesca Enea, and Brittany Schutte hit home runs for Florida in the second, third and fourth innings, respectively. East Carolina made the game uncomfortable in the fifth when, trailing 4-1, Marina Gusman-Brown hit a 2-RBI double to left field to bring the Pirates within a run. However, freshman pitchers Ensley Gammel and Erin Schuppert kept the East Carolina bats quiet for the remaining 2.1 innings, allowing only one base-runner.

=== Georgia Tech (USF Wilson-DeMarini Tournament) ===
	1	2	3	4	5	6	7	R	H	E
Gators	0	0	0	0	0	0	0	0	5	0
Yellow Jackets	0	0	0	0	1	2	X	3	5	0

The Gators left eight runners on base, seven in the first three innings, in the game and failed to score. Francesca Enea led Florida from the plate with a 2-for-3 performance at the plate. Georgia Tech broke up the scoreless game in the bottom of the 5th when Jessica Sinclair doubled to center and Kate Kuzma tripled to bring her home. Jen Yee tripled to lead off the sixth for the Yellow Jackets, and Hope Rush homered bringing the margin to three. The loss was the first of Stephanie Brombacher's Gator career.

=== South Florida (USF Wilson-DeMarini Tournament) ===
	1	2	3	4	5	6	7	R	H	E
Gators	3	2	2	1	0	3	1	12	12	0
Bulls	0	0	0	0	5	3	0	8	11	3

After leading by eight runs in the fifth inning, the Gators allowed the Bulls to come back into the game with a one-out grand slam. Stephanie Brombacher walked in a run before allowing the four additional runs. Then, in the sixth inning, South Florida strung together five hits to score three more runs. With two on and two outs, JoJo Medina doubled to right center, scoring both runners aboard. Back-to-back singles scored Medina before a line out ended the inning. Florida scored in every inning but the fifth, finally giving their pitchers some run support after struggling to get runners home in their first two games. In the top of the first, Francesca Enea sent the first pitch she saw over the wall in left field to score both Aja Paculba and Brittany Schutte, who were both walked to lead off the game. In the second inning, Enea scored Schutte, who reached on an error, with an RBI double. Enea moved to third on a passed ball and scored on a groundout by Kelsey Bruder. With one out in the next frame, Megan Bush and Michelle Moultrie reached base via a walk and a bunt single, respectively. Paculba singled to score them both. In the fourth, Tiffany DeFelice walked and scored on an RBI double from Corrie Brooks. Enea walked and Bruder singled to lead off the sixth inning. After DeFelice laid down a sacrifice bunt to move pinch runner Lauren Heil and Bruder over, Brooks advanced them both another bag with a fielder's choice which did not result in an out. A Bush sacrifice fly scored Bruder, and a single from Moultrie scored Brooks. In the final inning, up only three, the Gators scored one last insurance run. Schutte walked with one out and moved to second on a ground out by Enea. She would score on the next pitch, which Bruder sent up the middle.

=== Long Island (USF Wilson-DeMarini Tournament) ===
	1	2	3	4	5	6	7	R	H	E
Gators	0	0	0	1	0	1	5	7	7	0
Blackbirds	2	0	0	0	0	0	0	2	5	1

Long Island got on the board first in the bottom of the first. With two on base via the walk, Ensley Gammel gave up an RBI single to Emily Kakuska. Erin Schuppert, who relieved Gammel after she loaded in the bases, allowed another RBI single, but Francesca Enea kept a third run from scoring with a perfect throw home. Florida and Long Island traded zeros until the top of the fourth, when Corrie Brooks hit a solo homer to center. The Gators tied it with another solo home run two innings later, this time by Brittany Schutte. In the final frame, Florida took the lead with an RBI double by Aja Paculba. With two on and one out, Schutte drew a walk to load the bases for Enea, who promptly homered to give the Gators a 7-2 lead.

=== Campbell (Lipton Invitational - Game 4) ===
	1	2	3	4	5	6	7	R	H	E
Gators	0	1	0	2	0	3	1	7	11	0
Fighting Camels	0	0	0	0	0	0	0	0	3	1

=== Kansas (Lipton Invitational - Game 5) ===
	1	2	3	4	5	6	7	R	H	E
Jayhawks	0	2	0	1	0	1	-	4	6	2
Gators	2	1	4	1	2	2	-	12	14	1

=== Marshall (Lipton Invitational - Game 7) ===
	1	2	3	4	5	6	7	R	H	E
Thundering Herd	0	0	0	0	0	-	-	0	5	0
Gators	2	0	0	1	5	-	-	8	9	1

=== East Carolina (Lipton Invitational - Game 8) ===
	1	2	3	4	5	6	7	R	H	E
Gators	0	1	1	1	0	0	1	4	8	2
Pirates	1	0	1	0	0	0	1	3	6	1

=== East Carolina (Lipton Invitational - Game 12) ===
	1	2	3	4	5	6	7	R	H	E
Pirates	0	0	0	0	0	0	0	0	2	0
Gators	1	0	0	0	0	0	X	1	1	0

=== Northwestern State (Game 1) ===
	1	2	3	4	5	6	7	R	H	E
Demons	0	0	0	0	0	-	-	0	1	1
Gators	3	0	11	1	X	-	-	15	9	0

=== Northwestern State (Game 2) ===
	1	2	3	4	5	6	7	R	H	E
Demons	0	0	0	0	0	0	0	0	6	0
Gators	0	0	0	3	2	0	X	5	6	1

=== Northwestern State (Game 3) ===
	1	2	3	4	5	6	7	R	H	E
Demons	0	1	0	0	0	-	-	1	6	0
Gators	3	2	4	1	X	-	-	10	11	0

=== Pacific (DeMarini Tournament) ===
	1	2	3	4	5	6	7	R	H	E
Tigers	2	0	1	0	0	-	-	3	7	1
Gators	1	2	8	0	X	-	-	12	9	1

=== Stanford (DeMarini Tournament) ===
	1	2	3	4	5	6	7	R	H	E
Gators	0	0	0	0	0	0	0	0	2	0
Stanford	0	0	1	0	1	0	X	2	5	1

=== Cal State Fullerton (DeMarini Tournament) ===
	1	2	3	4	5	6	7	R	H	E
Gators	2	2	5	0	3	-	-	12	9	0
Titans	0	0	0	0	0	-	-	0	2	1

=== UC Davis (DeMarini Tournament) ===
	1	2	3	4	5	6	7	R	H	E
Aggies	0	0	0	0	3	-	-	3	3	0
Gators	1	8	3	2	X	-	-	14	16	0

=== Loyola Marymount (DeMarini Tournament) ===
	1	2	3	4	5	6	7	R	H	E
Gators	2	8	0	0	3	-	-	13	14	1
Aggies	0	0	0	1	0	-	-	1	2	0

=== Ole Miss (Game 1) ===
	1	2	3	4	5	6	7	R	H	E
Rebels	2	0	0	0	0	-	-	2	6	1
Gators	4	0	4	4	X	-	-	12	10	1

=== Ole Miss (Game 2) ===
	1	2	3	4	5	6	7	8	R	H	E
Rebels	0	0	1	0	1	0	1	3	6	13	1
Gators	0	0	0	0	3	0	0	1	4	10	0

=== Ole Miss (Game 3) ===
	1	2	3	4	5	6	7	R	H	E
Rebels	1	1	0	0	0	1	0	3	10	0
Gators	0	3	1	0	1	0	X	5	4	1

=== Auburn (Game 1) ===
	1	2	3	4	5	6	7	R	H	E
Tigers	0	0	0	0	0	0	0	0	4	3
Gators	2	1	1	0	0	3	X	7	6	0

=== Auburn (Game 2) ===
	1	2	3	4	5	6	7	R	H	E
Tigers	0	1	0	1	1	1	0	4	4	2
Gators	0	0	0	0	2	2	1	5	7	0

=== South Florida ===
	1	2	3	4	5	6	7	R	H	E
Bulls	0	0	0	0	0	-	-	0	0	0
Gators	5	2	1	2	X	-	-	10	10	0

=== Alabama (Game 1) ===
	1	2	3	4	5	6	7	R	H	E
Gators	0	2	2	0	0	0	0	4	3	2
Crimson Tide	1	0	0	0	8	1	X	10	8	1

=== Alabama (Game 2) ===
	1	2	3	4	5	6	7	8	R	H	E
Gators	0	0	0	0	0	3	2	2	7	11	2
Crimson Tide	2	2	0	0	0	0	1	0	5	8	0

=== Alabama (Game 3) ===
	1	2	3	4	5	6	7	R	H	E
Gators	1	3	4	1	0	0	2	11	9	2
Crimson Tide	4	0	1	0	0	4	0	9	11	4

=== UCF ===
	1	2	3	4	5	6	7	8	9	R	H	E
Gators	0	0	0	0	0	1	2	0	1	4	15	1
Golden Knights	0	0	0	0	1	2	0	0	0	3	10	1

=== LSU (Game 1) ===
	1	2	3	4	5	6	7	R	H	E
Tigers	0	0	0	0	0	1	0	1	5	0
Gators	2	2	0	0	0	0	X	4	7	0

=== LSU (Game 2) ===
	1	2	3	4	5	6	7	R	H	E
Tigers	0	0	1	0	0	0	0	1	2	0
Gators	0	0	0	0	0	1	1	2	5	2

=== LSU (Game 3) ===
	1	2	3	4	5	6	7	R	H	E
Tigers	0	0	0	1	0	0	0	1	4	0
Gators	0	1	2	0	0	4	X	7	10	1

=== Arkansas (Game 1) ===
	1	2	3	4	5	6	7	R	H	E
Gators	0	0	0	5	0	4	0	9	10	1
Razorbacks	3	0	0	0	0	1	1	5	10	3

=== Arkansas (Game 2) ===
	1	2	3	4	5	6	7	R	H	E
Gators	2	1	0	3	6	-	-	12	12	3
Razorbacks	0	0	0	0	3	-	-	3	3	0

=== Arkansas (Game 3) ===
	1	2	3	4	5	6	7	R	H	E
Gators	1	0	0	0	0	5	0	6	8	1
Razorbacks	0	0	0	0	1	0	0	1	4	1

== Ranking Movement ==
Poll	Last	Pre	Wk 1	Wk 2	Wk 3	Wk 4	Wk 5	Wk 6	Wk 7	Wk 8	Wk 9	Wk 10	Wk 11	Wk 12	Wk 13	Wk 14	Final
NFCA	2	3	3	3	3	4	6	6	6	4							
USA Softball	2	5	9	11	10	11	13	13	9	5							
* Indicates unanimous selection.

== Roster ==
The 2010 Florida Gators softball team has 2 seniors, 5 juniors, 3 sophomores, and 7 freshmen.

#	Name	Position	Height	B/T	Year	Hometown
2	Kelsey Bruder	UT	5-5	L/R	Jr	Corona, CA
3	Aja Paculba	2B	5-3	R/R	Jr	Wildomar, CA
7	Lauren Heil	3B	5-5	R/R	So	Pembroke Pines, FL
10	Francesca Enea	OF	5-8	R/R	Sr	Woodland Hills, CA
11	Ensley Gammel	RHP/UT	5-6	R/R	Fr	Bakersfield, CA
12	Megan Bush	UT	5-7	R/R	Jr	Anaheim Hills, CA
13	Shaunice Harris	1B	5-5	R/R	So	Moreno Valley, CA
15	Samantha Holle	INF	5-8	R/R	Fr	Tampa, FL
16	Michelle Moultrie	OF	5-3	L/R	So	Jacksonville, FL
18	Alyese Stapf	UT	5-8	R/R	Fr	Tampa, FL
20	Kelsey Horton	C	5-10	R/R	Fr	Valrico, FL
21	Erin Schuppert	RHP	5-8	R/R	Fr	Atlantic Beach, FL
22	Brittany Walker	UT	5-6	L/R	Fr	Tomball, TX
27	Corrie Brooks	3B	5-9	R/R	Sr	Christmas, FL
28	Tiffany DeFelice	C	5-5	R/R	Jr	Coral Springs, FL
32	Stephanie Brombacher	RHP	5-10	R/R	Jr	Pembroke Pines, FL
44	Brittany Schutte	UT	5-9	L/R	Fr	Fountain Valley, CA

== Coaching staff ==
Head coach: Tim Walton (5th season)
Assistant Coaches: Jennifer Rocha (5th season), Jenny Gladding (4th season)
Volunteer Coach: Coy Adkins (1st season)
Athletic Trainer: Eric King
Student Trainer: Melissa Rosen
Strength & Conditioning Coordinator: Steven Orris
Academic Counselor: Tony Meacham
Program Coordinator: Brittany Souilliard
Managers: Alex Dorsh, Melissa Howell, and David Lopez

== See also ==
- Florida Gators softball
