= 2012 SEC softball tournament =

2012 Southeastern Conference softball tournament
- Teams: 8
- Finals site: Rhoads Stadium; Tuscaloosa, AL
- Champions: Alabama (5th title)
- Runner-up: Florida (5th title game)
- Winning coach: Patrick Murphy (4th title)
- MVP: Jaclyn Traina (Alabama)
- Television: ESPNU; ESPN

The 2012 SEC softball tournament was held at Rhoads Stadium on the campus of The University of Alabama in Tuscaloosa, Alabama on May 10 through May 12, 2012. The Alabama Crimson Tide won the tournament for the 5th time in their history, and received the conference's automatic bid to the 2012 NCAA Division I softball tournament.

== Seeds ==
The seeding for the tournament is as follows:

| Seed | School | SEC Record |
|---|---|---|
| #1 | Alabama | 23-5 (47-6) |
| #2 | Tennessee | 22-6 (45-9) |
| #3 | Florida | 21-7 (44-10) |
| #4 | Georgia | 17-11 (40-14) |
| #5 | Kentucky | 15-13 (29-27) |
| #6 | LSU | 15-13 (34-21) |
| #7 | Auburn | 12-16 (33-20) |
| #8 | Mississippi State | 12-16 (33-21) |

== Tournament ==
Quarterfinals; May 10th ESPNU
3 | Florida | 1
6 | LSU | 0
2 | Tennessee | 2
7 | Auburn | 1
1 | Alabama | 5
8 | Mississippi State | 2
4 | Georgia | 6
5 | Kentucky | 4

Semifinals; May 11th ESPNU
3 | Florida | 2
2 | Tennessee | 1
1 | Alabama | 1
4 | Georgia | 0

Finals; May 12th ESPN
3 | Florida | 1
1 | Alabama | 10

- Arkansas, Ole Miss and South Carolina did not make the tournament. Vanderbilt does not sponsor a softball team.

== See also ==
- SEC softball tournament
- SEC Tournament
- 2012 Alabama Crimson Tide softball season
