= 2010 SEC softball tournament =

2010 Southeastern Conference softball tournament
- Finals site: Bogle Park; Fayetteville, Arkansas
- Champions: Alabama (4th title)
- Runner-up: LSU (9th title game)
- Winning coach: Patrick Murphy (3rd title)
- MVP: Kelsi Dunne (Alabama)

The 2010 SEC softball tournament was held at Bogle Park on the campus of the University of Arkansas in Fayetteville, Arkansas on May 13 through May 15, 2010. The Alabama Crimson Tide won the tournament for the fourth time in their history, and received the conference's automatic bid to the 2010 NCAA Division I softball tournament.

== Tournament ==
Quarterfinals; May 13
3	LSU	2
6	Kentucky	1
2	Florida	9
7	Auburn	1
1	Alabama	9
8	Arkansas	0
4	Georgia	4
5	Tennessee	6

Semifinals; May 14
3	LSU	9
2	Florida	1
1	Alabama	4
5	Tennessee	3

Finals; May 15
3	LSU	4
1	Alabama	5

== See also ==
- Women's College World Series
- NCAA Division I Softball Championship
- SEC softball tournament
- SEC Tournament
