= Alyson Habetz =

American college softball coach

Current position
- Title: Head coach
- Team: Louisiana
- Conference: Sun Belt
- Record: 58–52 (.527)

Biographical details
- Born: December 17, 1971 (age 54); Crowley, Louisiana, U.S.
- Education: University of Louisiana at Lafayette

Playing career
- 1990–1994: Louisiana
- 1995–1997: Colorado Silver Bullets
- 1998: Long Beach Aces

Coaching career (HC unless noted)
- 1998–2006: Alabama (asst.)
- 2007–2023: Alabama (assoc. HC)
- 2025–present: Louisiana

Head coaching record
- Overall: 58–52 (.527)

Alyson Habetz (born December 17, 1971) is an American college softball coach who is the current head coach at Louisiana.

== Early life and education ==
While in high school, Habetz spent two years fighting the state courts for the opportunity to play baseball and eventually became the first female in the state of Louisiana to play high school baseball, earning All-District honors at Notre Dame High School She also earned all-state honors as a basketball player. Habetz graduated from Notre Dame High School class of 1990 as its salutatorian.

She attended University of Louisiana at Lafayette where she played college basketball and college softball. In 1993, she helped the Ragin' Cajuns advance to the Women's College World Series for the first time in program history. In 1994 she earned third-team All-American honors. At the time of her graduation she was the program's seventh leading scorer in women's basketball history with 1,192 points.

== Playing career ==
Following her collegiate career she played professionally for the Colorado Silver Bullets as a pitcher for three years and one year for the Long Beach Aces as a first baseman and pitcher in 1998.

== Coaching career ==
=== Alabama ===
On September 21, 1998, Habetz joined Alabama's coaching staff in the program's third year, as the first assistant coach hired by Patrick Murphy. On July 11, 2007, she was promoted to associate head coach. On August 25, 2023, after 25 years with the program, she announced her retirement to help care for her mother.

During her time at Alabama she helped guide them to six SEC regular season titles, five SEC Tournament titles, 14 Women's College World Series appearances and in 2012 the Crimson Tide won its first national championship and the first for any Southeastern Conference program.

=== Louisiana ===
On June 25, 2024, Habetz was named the head coach at Louisiana, returning to her alma mater.

== Honors ==
Habetz was inducted into the University of Louisiana's Athletics Hall of Fame in 2003, the Louisiana High School Coaches Association Hall of Fame in 2006, Louisiana Softball Hall of Fame in 2016 and the West Alabama Softball Hall of Fame in 2019.

== Head coaching record ==
Record table
Season	Team	Overall	Conference	Standing	Postseason
Louisiana Ragin' Cajuns (Sun Belt Conference) (2025–present)
2025	Louisiana	29–25	14–10	T–3rd	
2026	Louisiana	29–27	11–13	T–6th	
Louisiana:		58–52 (.527)	25–23 (.521)		
Total:		29–25 (.537)			
National champion Postseason invitational champion Conference regular season champion Conference regular season and conference tournament champion Division regular season champion Division regular season and conference tournament champion Conference tournament champion
