= Brittany Rogers (softball) =

American softball player

- Born: October 18, 1986 (age 38); Dacula, Georgia, U.S.

Brittany Fawne Mayweather (née Rogers; born October 18, 1986) is an African-American, former collegiate four-time All-American, left-handed hitting softball player, originally from Dacula, Georgia.

== Playing career ==
She was a star outfielder for the Alabama Crimson Tide softball team in the Southeastern Conference from 2006 to 2009. Following her freshman year, she was named SEC Freshman of the Year. Rogers is considered one of the best outfielders in NCAA softball history. Rogers became only the second player in Alabama history to hit over .400 in three seasons. She became one of the elite player in NCAA history and the second at Alabama to hit .400, tally over 300 hits, 200 runs and 100 stolen bases. Rogers holds the Alabama record for stolen bases with 198 and ranks second all-time with a .417 career batting average, 343 hits and 256 runs.

After graduating from Alabama, Rogers turned down offers to play pro softball in order to be a fourth grade teacher.

== Statistics ==
Alabama Crimson Tide
YEAR	G	AB	R	H	BA	RBI	HR	3B	2B	TB	SLG	BB	SO	SB	SBA
2006	65	206	60	88	.427	18	0	0	6	94	.456%	16	34	38	47
2007	65	219	68	88	.402	34	4	4	8	116	.529%	9	19	48	54
2008	66	217	79	98	.451	22	1	1	13	116	.534%	20	21	60	66
2009	60	181	49	69	.381	15	0	0	6	75	.414%	19	26	52	61
TOTALS	256	823	256	343	.417	89	5	5	33	401	.487%	64	100	198	228
