= DRASH =

Type of field shelter

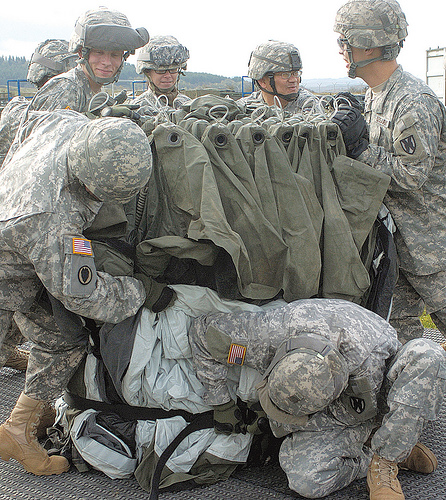
Setting up a DRASH tent

A DRASH TMSS Large

DRASH (Deployable Rapid Assembly Shelter) is a portable geodesic shelter that can be set up after arriving on site with no special tools. The structure is supported by composite struts.

== Design ==
DRASH shelters have footprints from 109 sq ft (10.1 m^{2}) up to 1,250 sq ft (116 m^{2}). Each DRASH shelter comes with flooring and ground covers manufactured from polyester and nylon. DRASH also provides generators and trailers plus various accessories for the shelters themselves. Several of these accessories can be used to link shelters together. For transport or storage, the shelters pack down to into a transport bag that can be stowed on a trailer or HMMWV.

== History ==
DHS Systems founder and CEO A. Jon Prusmack began building DRASH shelters after being inspired by pop-up geodesic domes he came across at trade shows. He founded the company in 1984 and DRASH shelters quickly started to be purchased by military units for use as command posts, tactical operations centers, communications centers, battalion aid stations, and forward surgical support stations.

In 2004, the Carlyle Group invested in DHS Systems and formed its new parent company DHS Technologies. In 2009, it was reported that the company was working on a line of shelters/generators that better matched power supply to demand.

== Military use ==
The United States Military and NATO are using DRASH shelters in place of the various tents and shelters used in the past. The Department of Defense has awarded DRASH several contracts.

Most notably, in 2008, the U.S. Army contracted DRASH manufacturer DHS Systems and Northrop Grumman Corporation to provide a family of trailer-mounted support systems under its Standard Integrated Command Post System (SICPS) program. Under the contract, DHS is manufacturing DRASH shelters, while Northrop will be responsible for program management and integrated logistics support.

DRASH shelters have been deployed extensively since the beginning of the wars in Iraq and Afghanistan. DRASH is also currently in use with troops stationed around the world, including the Third Army in Kuwait, and Joint Task Force Bravo's Mobile Surgical Team in Honduras. DRASH has logistics teams on site in Iraq, Kuwait, Germany and Eastern Europe. These teams do all of the repair and support work for the shelters, generators and trailers.

== Civilian use ==
Hurricane Katrina caused a surge of interest in DRASH shelters. In Louisiana, an emergency medical team used a DRASH shelter as a mobile hospital. In Mississippi, DRASH shelters were used as living quarters for the State Police aiding victims of the disaster. DRASH shelters have been deployed following hurricanes across the Gulf region, as well as for other civilian operations around the country.

In 2006, the state of Connecticut dedicated a DRASH field hospital to a victim of the 2001 anthrax attacks. DRASH shelters were also used by the National Guard during the October 2007 California Wildfires, Middletown’s Office of Emergency Management and the state’s Department of Public Health following the 2010 Connecticut power plant explosion and Dell Children's Medical Center during the 2009 flu pandemic. Additionally, international agencies have purchased DRASH to support emergency response. In the summer of 2009, the Brazilian State of Rio de Janeiro purchased two DRASH mobile field hospitals to be deployed during large-scale emergencies.
