= Amanda Locke =

American softball player and coach

Current position
- Title: Head coach
- Team: Birmingham–Southern
- Conference: SAA
- Record: 13-4

Biographical details
- Born: Mesquite, Texas, U.S.
- Education: University of Alabama

Playing career
- 2009–2012: Alabama
- Position: First baseman / pitcher

Coaching career (HC unless noted)
- 2013–2014: Northwestern State (assistant)
- 2015–2018: Texas Tech (assistant)
- 2019–2021: Northwestern State (associate head coach)
- 2022–present: Birmingham–Southern

Head coaching record
- Overall: 28-4

Amanda Locke is an American, former collegiate All-American softball player and current coach at Birmingham–Southern College.

== Playing career ==
She attended North Mesquite High School, graduating in 2008. She later attended the University of Alabama, where she played first base and pitcher on the Alabama Crimson Tide softball team. Following her freshman year, she was named SEC Freshman of the Year. During her senior season in 2012, Locke was named a second team All-American, as she led the Crimson Tide to the 2012 Women's College World Series final, where they defeated Oklahoma 2–1 in the champ series, to claim Alabama's and the Southeastern Conference's first NCAA softball title.

== Coaching career ==
After graduating from Alabama, Locke served as an assistant softball coach at Northwestern State from 2013 to 2014, and an assistant softball coach at Texas Tech University from 2015 to 2018. On August 27, 2018, Locke returned to Northwestern State and was once again named an assistant softball coach for the Lady Demons.

On July 28, 2021, Locke was named head softball coach at Birmingham–Southern College.

== Statistics ==
=== Alabama Crimson Tide ===
YEAR	G	AB	R	H	BA	RBI	HR	3B	2B	TB	SLG	BB	SO	SB	SBA
2009	59	131	26	38	.290	30	9	0	6	71	.542%	15	42	2	2
2010	57	139	33	39	.280	43	17	0	9	99	.712%	16	36	1	2
2011	51	114	22	35	.307	32	10	0	4	69	.605%	16	22	0	2
2012	65	165	36	52	.315	56	18	1	8	116	.703%	22	35	2	2
TOTALS	232	549	117	164	.298	161	54	1	27	355	.646%	69	135	5	8

YEAR	W	L	GP	GS	CG	SHO	SV	IP	H	R	ER	BB	SO	ERA	WHIP
2009	8	0	15	7	5	1	0	49.1	41	16	11	15	42	1.57	1.14
2010	5	2	17	4	0	0	0	38.1	38	23	16	7	39	2.94	1.18
2012	5	1	19	6	2	0	1	58.1	59	35	28	24	56	3.37	1.43
TOTALS	18	3	51	17	7	1	1	146.0	138	74	55	46	137	2.63	1.26

== Head coaching record ==
Record table
Season	Team	Overall	Conference	Standing	Postseason
Birmingham–Southern Panthers (Southern Athletic Association) (2022–present)
2022	Birmingham–Southern	0–0	0–0		
Birmingham–Southern:		0–0	0–0		
Total:		0–0			
National champion Postseason invitational champion Conference regular season champion Conference regular season and conference tournament champion Division regular season champion Division regular season and conference tournament champion Conference tournament champion
