= Katie Seashole Pressly Softball Stadium =

Softball stadium in Gainesville, Florida

Coordinates: 29.638478°N 82.364929°W

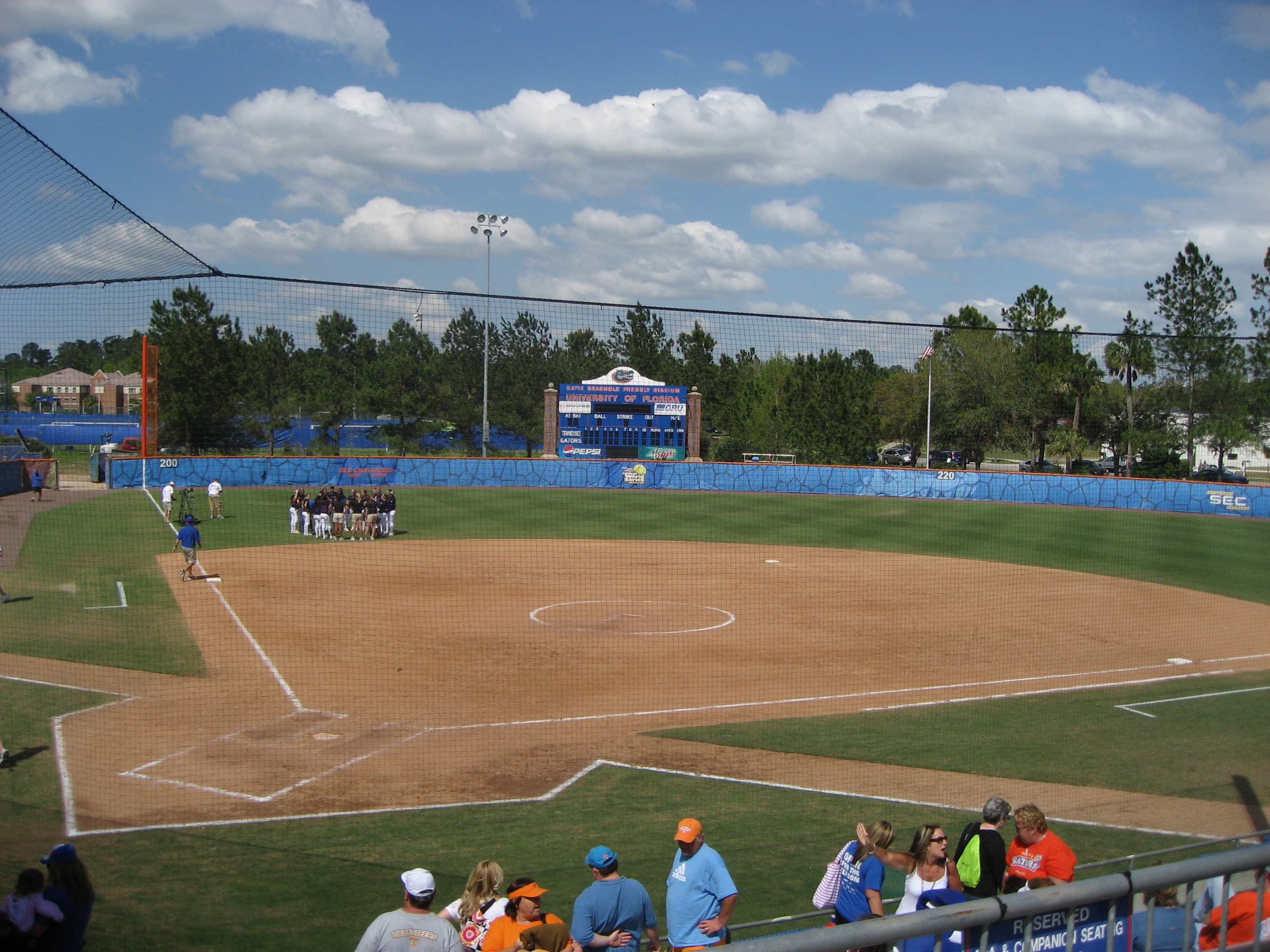
- Interactive map of Katie Seashole Pressly; Softball Stadium
- Former names: Florida Softball Stadium (1997–2007)
- Location: Gainesville, Florida
- Owner: University of Florida
- Capacity: 2,800
- Surface: Grass
- Record attendance: 3,140; May 26, 2019 vs. Tennessee
- Field size: Left Field: 200 ft. Center Field: 220 ft. Right Field: 200 ft.

Construction
- Groundbreaking: February 1, 1996
- Opened: February 8, 1997
- Renovated: 2001, 2012, 2018-2019
- Cost: $2.6 million

Tenant
- Florida Gators softball (NCAA) (1997-present)

The Katie Seashole Pressly Softball Stadium is the home field of the Florida Gators softball team of the University of Florida. The stadium is located at the corner of Hull Road and Museum Road, on the university's Gainesville, Florida campus.

== History ==
Katie Seashole Pressly Softball Stadium was built in 1996 at a cost of $2.6 million. The stadium seats approximately 1,200 and is named after benefactor Katie Pressly. The stadium features a clay infield and a natural grass outfield, and complies with NCAA and Olympic specifications. The Gators played their first game in the stadium against the Stetson Hatters on February 8, 1997.

== Renovations ==
On March 23, 2017, UAA Communications announced the timeline and details for renovating Katie Seashole Pressly Stadium by the Gainesville-based construction management company Scorpio. With an estimated budget of $11 million, construction began in of Summer 2018 and was expected to be completed prior to the 2019 Season.

The renovation cost $15 million and included a 360 degree open concourse, an elevated press box, shade structures for fans, on-site office space for coaches, expanded dugouts, a larger lounge, and a new locker room. Additionally, the renovations increased the seating capacity of the stadium to 2,800 seats, which included an increase in chairback seating from 1,431 to approximately 2,280. The newly renovated stadium made its debut on February 12, 2019, when the Florida Gators played an exhibition game against Japan.

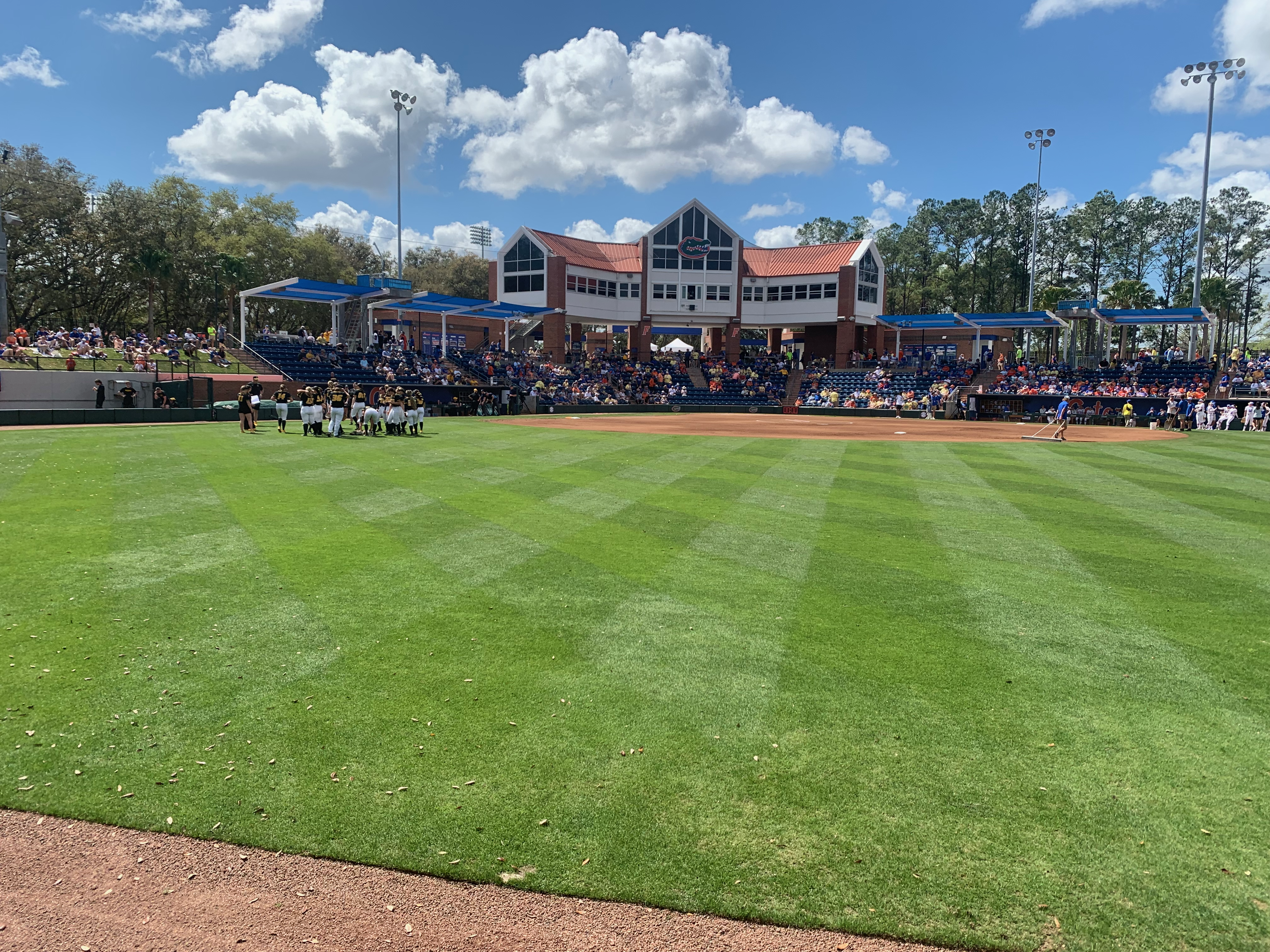
KSP Softball Stadium during 2026 season (Florida vs. Missouri)

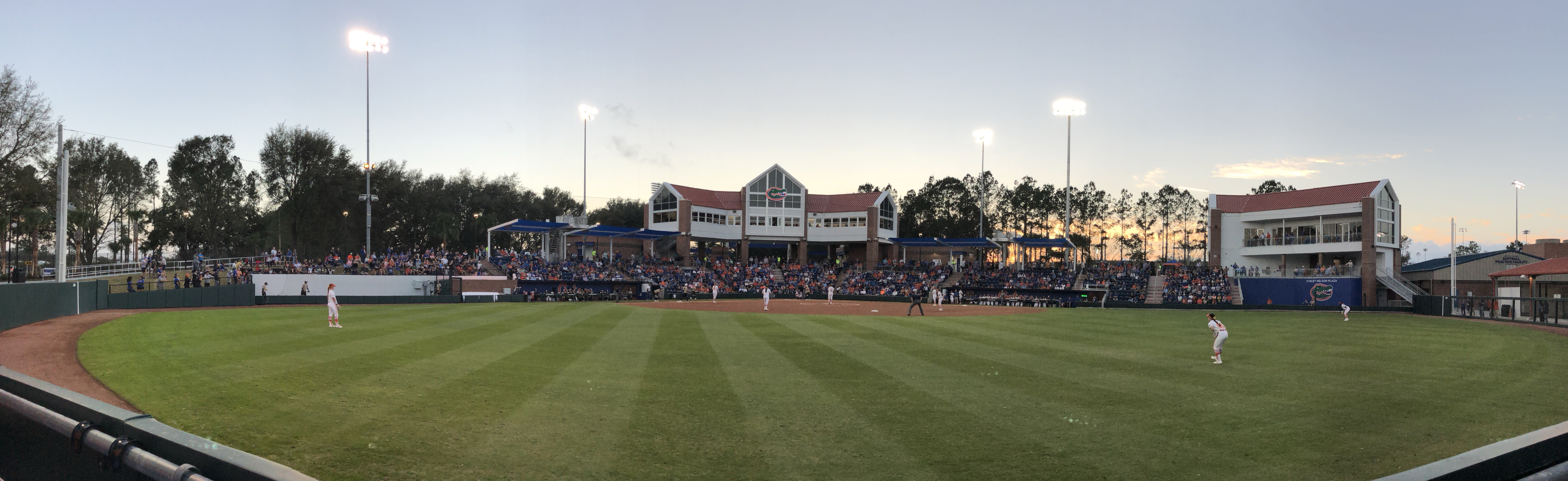
Debut of the newly renovated stadium — February 12, 2019 (Florida vs. Japan)

== See also ==
- University of Florida Athletic Association
- Buildings at the University of Florida
