= Alabama Crimson Tide softball =

Alabama Crimson Tide
- 2026 Alabama Crimson Tide softball team
- Founded: 1997 (29 years ago)
- University: University of Alabama
- Athletic director: Greg Byrne
- Head coach: Patrick Murphy (27th season)
- Conference: SEC
- Location: Tuscaloosa, Alabama, US
- Home stadium: Rhoads Stadium (capacity: 3,940)
- Nickname: Crimson Tide
- Colors: Crimson and white

NCAA Tournament champions
- 2012

NCAA WCWS runner-up
- 2014

NCAA WCWS appearances
- 2000, 2003, 2005, 2006, 2008, 2009, 2011, 2012, 2014, 2015, 2016, 2019, 2021, 2023, 2024, 2026

NCAA super regional appearances
- 2005, 2006, 2007, 2008, 2009, 2010, 2011, 2012, 2013, 2014, 2015, 2016, 2017, 2018, 2019, 2021, 2023, 2024, 2025, 2026

NCAA Tournament appearances
- 1999, 2000, 2001, 2002, 2003, 2004, 2005, 2006, 2007, 2008, 2009, 2010, 2011, 2012, 2013, 2014, 2015, 2016, 2017, 2018, 2019, 2021, 2022, 2023, 2024, 2025, 2026

Conference tournament championships
- 1998, 2003, 2005, 2010, 2012, 2021

Regular-season conference championships
- 2006, 2010, 2011, 2012, 2014, 2019

The Alabama Crimson Tide softball team represents the University of Alabama in NCAA Division I college softball. The team participates in the Southeastern Conference (SEC). It is currently led by head coach Patrick Murphy and assistant coaches Lance McMahon and Kayla Braud. The team plays its home games at the Rhoads Stadium located on the university's campus. The Alabama Crimson Tide softball team won its first national championship in 2012, after they defeated the Oklahoma Sooners in the championship series of the Women's College World Series.

== History ==
On September 28, 1995, Alabama athletics director Glen Tuckett announced the school would sponsor a softball program to begin play in the 1997 season. At the time of its addition, softball became both the 20th varsity sport overall and 11th women's sport sponsored at Alabama. On January 3, 1996, Kalum Haack was hired from Kansas to serve as the first head coach for the team. The next spring, Haack recruited his first class for the inaugural 1997 team. On February 15, 1997, Alabama defeated Tulsa 5–2 in their first all-time game at ASA Hall of Fame Stadium in Oklahoma City. Two weeks later, the Crimson Tide won their first all-time home game in their home opener at Sokol Park against Delta State 4–3.

After he led the Crimson Tide in their inaugural season and to their first SEC championship in their second season, on June 30, 1998, Haack resigned as head coach. He cited personal reasons for his resignation. During his two-year stint as head coach, Haack compiled an overall record of 78 wins and 47 losses (78–47). A week later on July 9, Alabama assistant coach Patrick Murphy was promoted to the Crimson Tide's head coach position.

Since Murphy took over in 1999, the Crimson Tide has won 12 SEC championships (6 regular season and 6 tournaments), made 27 consecutive NCAA tournaments (every year since 1999) and have advanced to the Women's College World Series 16 times. In 2012, Alabama defeated the Oklahoma Sooners, 2 games to 1, in the championship series of the Women's College World Series, to win its first national championship in school history and the first softball national championship in the history of the SEC.

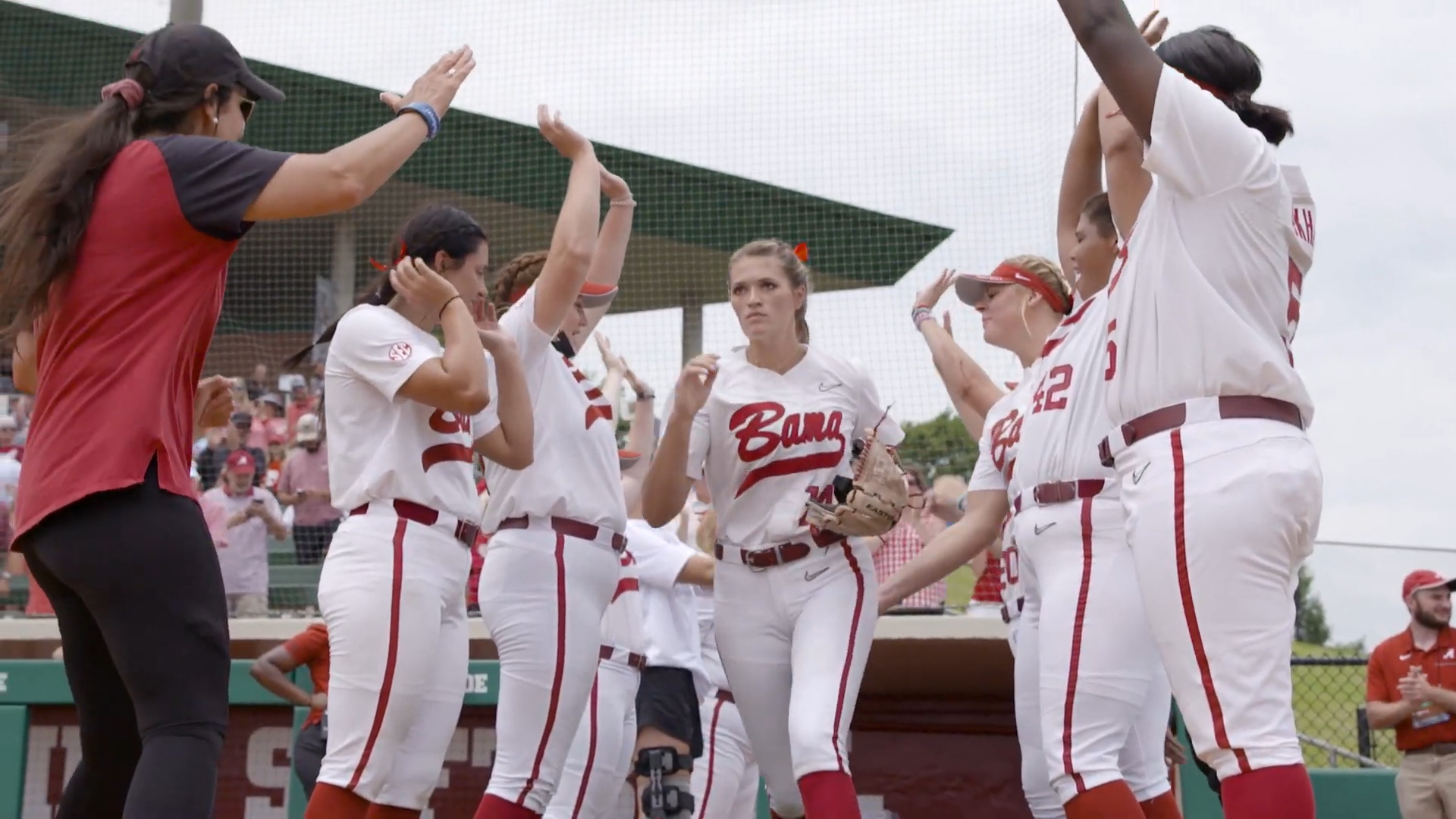
A Crimson Tide softball player takes the field before a game at Rhoads Stadium

== Head coaches ==
Name	Years	Record	%
Kalum Haack	1997–1998	78–47	.624
Patrick Murphy	1999–present	1,319–398	.768

== Coaching Staff ==
Name	Position coached	Consecutive season at Alabama in current position
Patrick Murphy	Head Coach	28th
Lance McMahon	Assistant Coach	4th
Kayla Braud	Assistant Coach	3rd
Adam Arbour	Assistant Coach	3rd

== Year-by-year records ==
Record table
Season	Coach	Overall	Conference	Standing	Postseason
Southeastern Conference (1997–present)
1997	Kalum Haack	29–29	16–14	2nd (Western)	SEC tournament (0–2)
1998	Kalum Haack	49–18	19–7	2nd (Western)	SEC tournament (4–1)
1999	Patrick Murphy	39–26	19–11	2nd (Western)	SEC tournament (1–2); NCAA Regional (0–2)
2000	Patrick Murphy	66–14	25–5	2nd (Western)	SEC tournament (2–2); NCAA Regional (4–0); College World Series (1–2)
2001	Patrick Murphy	50–11	24–6	2nd (Western)	SEC tournament (1–2); NCAA Regional (2–2)
2002	Patrick Murphy	46–21	22–8	2nd (Western)	SEC tournament (2–2); NCAA Regional (0–2)
2003	Patrick Murphy	49–21	22–8	1st (Western)	SEC tournament (4–0); NCAA Regional (4–0); College World Series (0–2)
2004	Patrick Murphy	45–20	18–12	3rd (Western)	SEC tournament (1–2); NCAA Regional (3–2)
2005	Patrick Murphy	63–15	23–7	1st (Western)	SEC tournament (4–1); NCAA Regional (3–0); NCAA Super Regional (2–0); College World Series (1–2)
2006	Patrick Murphy	54–11	25–4	1st	SEC tournament (1–1); NCAA Regional (3–0); NCAA Super Regional (2–0); College World Series (0–2)
2007	Patrick Murphy	55–10	21–6	2nd (Western)	SEC tournament (1–1); NCAA Regional (4–1); NCAA Super Regional (0–2)
2008	Patrick Murphy	58–8	25–3	1st (Western)	SEC tournament (2–1); NCAA Regional (3–0); NCAA Super Regional (2–0); College World Series (2–2)
2009	Patrick Murphy	54–11	21–6	1st (Western)	SEC tournament (2–1); NCAA Regional (3–0); NCAA Super Regional (2–0); College World Series (2–2)
2010	Patrick Murphy	52–11	23–4	1st	SEC tournament (3–0); NCAA Regional (3–0); NCAA Super Regional (1–2)
2011	Patrick Murphy	51–9	19–6	1st	SEC tournament (1–1); NCAA Regional (3–0); NCAA Super Regional (2–1); College World Series (2–2)
2012	Patrick Murphy	60–8	23–5	1st	SEC tournament (3–0); NCAA Regional (3–0); NCAA Super Regional (2–0); College World Series (5–1)
2013	Patrick Murphy	45–15	13–11	3rd (Western)	SEC tournament (1–1); NCAA Regional (3–0); NCAA Super Regional (0–2)
2014	Patrick Murphy	53–13	19–5	1st	SEC tournament (1–1); NCAA Regional (3–0); NCAA Super Regional (2–0); College World Series (3–2)
2015	Patrick Murphy	48–15	17–7	3rd	SEC tournament (1–1); NCAA Regional (3–0); NCAA Super Regional (2–1); College World Series (1–2)
2016	Patrick Murphy	51–12	17–8	5th	SEC tournament (1–1); NCAA Regional (3–0); NCAA Super Regional (2–0); College World Series (0–2)
2017	Patrick Murphy	46–18	12–11	5th	SEC tournament (2–1); NCAA Regional (3–0); NCAA Super Regional (1–2)
2018	Patrick Murphy	36–20	12–12	8th	SEC tournament (1–1); NCAA Regional (3–0); NCAA Super Regional (0–2)
2019	Patrick Murphy	60–10	18–6	1st	SEC tournament (2–1); NCAA Regional (3–0); NCAA Super Regional (2–1); College World Series (3–2)
2020	Patrick Murphy	14–8	2–1		Cancelled due to COVID-19 pandemic
2021	Patrick Murphy	52–9	18–6	3rd	SEC tournament (3–0); NCAA Regional (3–0); NCAA Super Regional (2–0); College World Series (2–2)
2022	Patrick Murphy	44–13	16–8	2nd	SEC Tournament (0–1); NCAA Regional (3–2)
2023	Patrick Murphy	45–22	14–10	5th	SEC Tournament (2–1); NCAA Regional (3–1); NCAA Super Regional (2–1); College World Series (0–2)
2024	Patrick Murphy	39–20	10–14	9th	SEC Tournament (0–1); NCAA Regional (3–0); NCAA Super Regional (2–1); College World Series (1–2)
2025	Patrick Murphy	40–21	12–12	T–10th	SEC Tournament (1–1); NCAA Regional (3–0); NCAA Super Regional (0–2)
2026	Patrick Murphy	52–7	20–4	2nd	SEC Tournament (2–1); NCAA Regional (3–0); NCAA Super Regional
Total:		1,422–431	513–211		
National champion Postseason invitational champion Conference regular season champion Conference regular season and conference tournament champion Division regular season champion Division regular season and conference tournament champion Conference tournament champion

=== NCAA Tournament seeding history ===
National seeding began in 2005. The Alabama Crimson Tide are one of only two teams to have a national seed every year, along with Tennessee.

Years →	'05	'06	'07	'08	'09	'10	'11	'12	'13	'14	'15	'16	'17	'18	'19	'21	'22	'23	'24	'25	'26
Seeds →	12	5	11	3	4	1	2	2	10	2	6	6	16	12	8	3	6	5	14	15	1

== Awards and honors ==
=== National awards ===
NFCA National Pitcher of the Year

- Montana Fouts (2021)

Softball America Pitcher of the Year

- Montana Fouts (2023)

D1Softball Pitcher of the Year

- Montana Fouts (2021)

Honda Sports Award

- Montana Fouts (2023)

=== Conference awards ===
SEC Player of the Year

- Charlotte Morgan (2009, 2010)
- Bailey Hemphill (2021)

SEC Pitcher of the Year

- Stephanie VanBrakle (2006)
- Kelsi Dunne (2010, 2011)
- Jackie Traina (2012, 2014)
- Sarah Cornell (2019)
- Montana Fouts (2021)
- Jocelyn Briski (2026)

SEC Freshman of the Year

- Lacy Prejean (2000)
- Jackie McClain (2001)
- Stephanie VanBrakle (2003)
- Brittany Rogers (2006)
- Kelsi Dunne (2008)
- Amanda Locke (2009)
- Kayla Braud (2010)
- Alexis Osorio (2015)
- Montana Fouts (2019)

== Alabama's Louisville Slugger/NFCA All-Americans ==
Player	Year(s)
Kelly Kretschman	1998, 1999, 2000†, 2001†
Carrie Moreman	1999
Ginger Jones	2000†
Shelley Laird	2000, 2001
Suzanne Olcott	2001
Ashley Courtney	2002†, 2005
Jackie McClain	2001, 2002, 2003, 2004
Stephanie VanBrakle	2005, 2006
Brittany Rogers	2006, 2007, 2008†, 2009
Lauren Parker	2007†
Chrissy Owens	2007
Kelley Montalvo	2008†
Charlotte Morgan	2008†, 2009†, 2010
Kelsi Dunne	2008, 2009†, 2010, 2011†
Kayla Braud	2010, 2011†, 2013†
Whitney Larsen	2011
Jackie Traina	2011†, 2012†, 2013, 2014†
Kaila Hunt	2012, 2013
Amanda Locke	2012
Jennifer Fenton	2012
Haylie McCleney	2013, 2014†, 2015†, 2016†
Alexis Osorio	2015, 2017†
Marisa Runyon	2015
Demi Turner	2015
Leona Lafaele	2016
Sydney Littlejohn	2016
Kaylee Tow	2018, 2019, 2021
Bailey Hemphill	2019, 2021†
Montana Fouts	2019, 2021†, 2022, 2023†
Kayla Beaver	2024
Audrey Vandagriff	2025

†Denotes 1st Team selection

== See also ==
- List of NCAA Division I softball programs
