= Rhoads Stadium =

Softball stadium in Tuscaloosa, Alabama

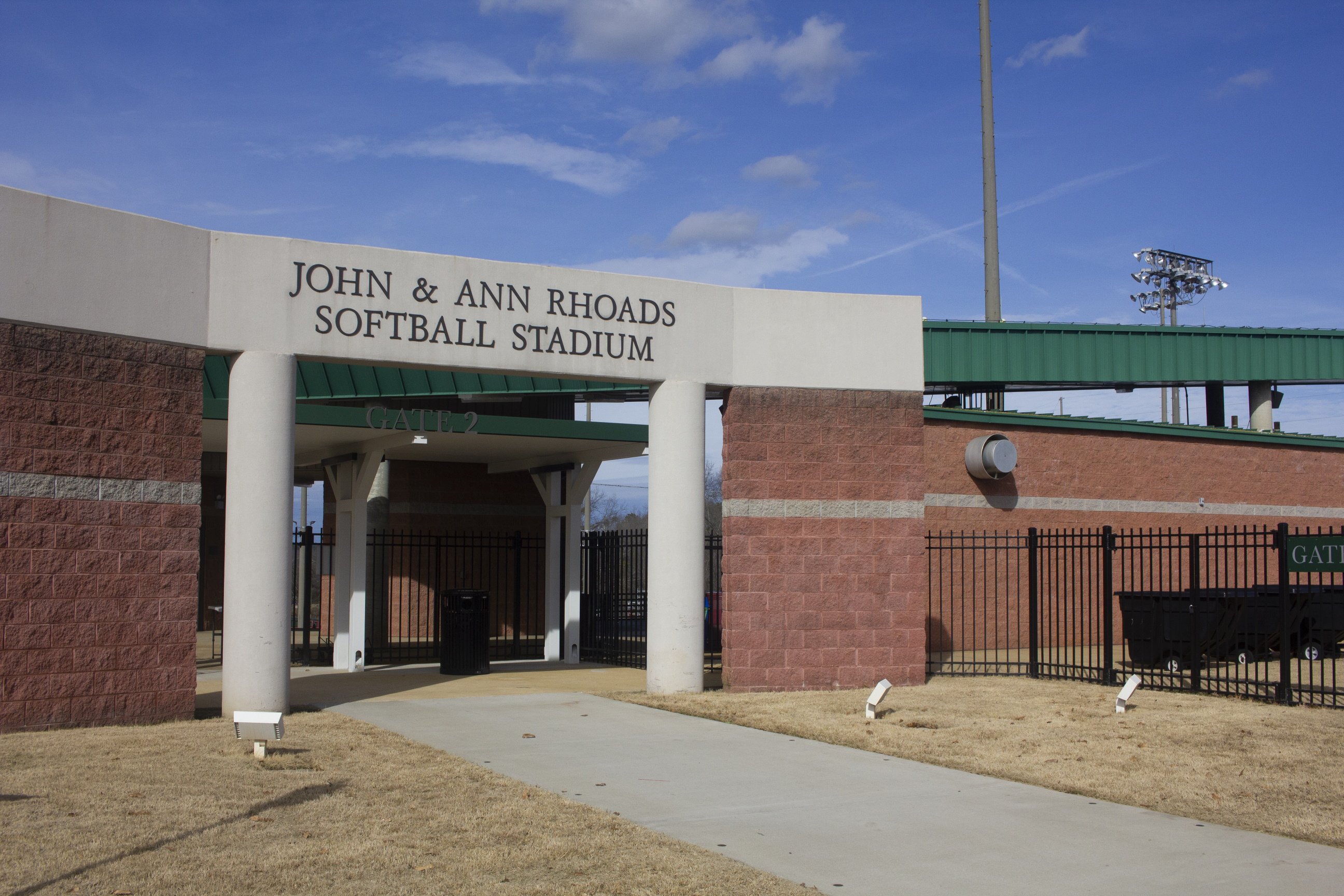
- Interactive map of Rhoads Stadium
- Full name: John and Ann Rhoads Softball Stadium
- Former names: Alabama Softball Complex (2000–2010)
- Location: 321 5th Avenue; Tuscaloosa, Alabama
- Coordinates: 33.213343°N 87.530383°W
- Owner: University of Alabama
- Operator: UA Athletics
- Capacity: 3,940
- Surface: Natural grass
- Scoreboard: Video board and full box score LED scoreboard by Daktronics
- Field size: Left Field: 200 ft Center Field: 220 ft Right Field: 200 ft

Construction
- Opened: February 23, 2000
- Cost: $2.2 million
- Architect: Rosser International
- General contractor: N. C. Morgan Construction

Tenants
- Alabama Crimson Tide Softball (NCAA); 2000–present

The John and Ann Rhoads Softball Stadium (frequently shortened to Rhoads Stadium) is a college softball stadium located on the campus of the University of Alabama in Tuscaloosa, Alabama. It serves as the home field of the Alabama Crimson Tide softball team and is located on the corner of Peter Bryce Boulevard and Campus Drive on the northeast corner of campus. The Crimson Tide's all-time record at Rhoads Stadium is 316–50 (.863). After they played their first season at Sokol Park and at Bowers Park for both the 1998 and 1999 seasons, the Crimson Tide opened Rhoads Stadium on February 23, 2000, with a 7–1 victory over the UAB Blazers.

John L. Rhoads was a graduate of the University of Alabama and a long-time partner at accounting firm Ernst & Ernst. He died in 2001.

== Events hosted ==
While the general use of the Rhoads Stadium is the regular season home of the Crimson Tide, it has also played host to a number of different events including multiple post season NCAA and SEC tournaments, as well as marquee exhibition games.

=== Post season tournaments ===
Year	Event	Participants	Champion
2001	NCAA Regional	Alabama, Chattanooga, Illinois-Chicago, Michigan, Oregon State, South Florida	Michigan
2003	NCAA Regional	Alabama, Chattanooga, Georgia Tech, Illinois, Massachusetts, Southern, Southern Illinois, Stanford	Alabama
2004	SEC tournament	Alabama, Auburn, Georgia, Florida, LSU, Mississippi State, South Carolina, Tennessee	LSU
2005	NCAA Regional	Alabama, Arizona State, Hofstra, Mississippi Valley St.	Alabama
2005	Super Regional	Alabama, Texas A&M	Alabama
2006	NCAA Regional	Alabama, Florida A&M, Georgia Tech, Mississippi Valley St.	Alabama
2006	Super Regional	Alabama, Stanford	Alabama
2007	NCAA Regional	Alabama, California, Florida State, Tennessee Tech	Alabama
2008	NCAA Regional	Alabama, Chattanooga, Florida State, Jacksonville State	Alabama
2008	Super Regional	Alabama, Missouri	Alabama
2009	NCAA Regional	Alabama, Chattanooga, Mississippi Valley State, Texas	Alabama
2009	Super Regional	Alabama, Jacksonville State	Alabama
2010	NCAA Regional	Alabama, Alcorn State, Lipscomb, UAB	Alabama
2010	Super Regional	Alabama, Hawai'i	Hawai'i
2011	NCAA Regional	Alabama, Chattanooga, Jackson State, Memphis	Alabama
2011	Super Regional	Alabama, Stanford	Alabama
2012	SEC tournament	Alabama, Auburn, Georgia, Florida, Kentucky, LSU, Mississippi State, Tennessee	Alabama
2012	NCAA Regional	Alabama, Tennessee-Martin, Georgia Tech, South Alabama	Alabama
2012	Super Regional	Alabama, Michigan	Alabama
2013	NCAA Regional	Alabama, Western Kentucky, South Carolina Upstate, Jacksonville State	Alabama
2014	NCAA Regional	Alabama, SIU Edwardsville, USC Upstate, South Alabama	Alabama
2014	Super Regional	Alabama, Nebraska	Alabama
2015	NCAA Regional	Alabama, Fairfield, Washington, USC Upstate	Alabama
2015	Super Regional	Alabama, Oklahoma	Alabama
2016	NCAA Regional	Alabama, Samford, California, North Dakota	Alabama
2016	Super Regional	Alabama, Washington	Alabama
2017	NCAA Regional	Alabama, Minnesota, Albany, Louisiana Tech	Alabama
2018	NCAA Regional	Alabama, Middle Tennessee, Oregon State, Wisconsin	Alabama
2019	NCAA Regional	Alabama, Alabama State, Lipscomb, Arizona State	Alabama
2019	Super Regional	Alabama, Texas	Alabama
2021	SEC tournament	Alabama, Auburn, Florida, LSU, Mississippi State, South Carolina, Tennessee, Texas A&M, Arkansas, Kentucky, Ole Miss	Alabama
2021	NCAA Regional	Alabama, Alabama State, Clemson, Troy	Alabama
2021	Super Regional	Alabama, Kentucky	Alabama
2025	NCAA Regional	Alabama, Virginia Tech, Belmont, Jackson State	TBD

== Attendance ==
As the program has continued to grow, attendance at Rhoads Stadium has continued to increase. In 2010, the Crimson Tide established a new single season, NCAA attendance record with 63,271 fans in attendance over the course of their 28 home dates. Their record was subsequently broken by Arizona in 2011 when the Wildcats saw 72,545 fans in attendance over the course of their 28 home dates. Prior to the 2012 season, Rhoads Stadium saw its capacity increase to 3,940, and Alabama reached that capacity for the first time on April 14, 2012, in a 7–5 win against South Carolina to set a new school, single-game attendance record. These attendance records are more easily reached given the only softball stadium with more capacity in the United States is the ASA Hall of Fame Stadium (the home stadium of the NCAA Softball World Series).
