= Patrick Murphy (softball) =

American college softball coach

- Patrick Murphy in 2026

Current position
- Title: Head coach
- Team: Alabama
- Conference: SEC
- Record: 1,373–405 (.772)

Biographical details
- Born: November 28, 1965 (age 60); Waterloo, Iowa, U.S.
- Education: University of Northern Iowa; University of Louisiana at Lafayette

Coaching career (HC unless noted)
- 1990–1994: Southwestern Louisiana (asst.)
- 1995: Northwest Missouri State (interim HC)
- 1996–1998: Alabama (asst.)
- 1999–present: Alabama

Head coaching record
- Overall: 1,401–425 (.767)
- Tournaments: NCAA: 114–50 (.695)

Accomplishments and honors

Championships
- Women's College World Series Champions (2012); 6× SEC Regular Season Champions (2006, 2010, 2011, 2012, 2014, 2019); 5× SEC tournament Champions (2003, 2005, 2010, 2012, 2021)

Awards
- NFCA National Coaching Staff of the Year (2012); 11× NFCA South Regional Coaching Staff of the Year (2000, 2003, 2006, 2008–2012, 2014, 2016, 2019); 6× SEC Coach of the Year (2006, 2010, 2012, 2014, 2019, 2026); Alabama Sports Hall of Fame

Patrick Stacy Murphy (born November 28, 1965) is an American softball coach and the current head coach of the Alabama Crimson Tide softball team. He was inducted into the Alabama Sports Hall of Fame on May 7, 2022—the first softball coach to be so honored.

== Early life and education ==
Murphy was born in Waterloo, Iowa, and raised in nearby Fayette. Murphy graduated from Fayette High School and completed his B.S. in history education at the University of Northern Iowa in 1988.

== Coaching career ==
=== Early coaching career ===
While attending Northern Iowa, Murphy coached Little League baseball. After graduating from college, Murphy became varsity baseball coach at Sumner High School in Sumner, Iowa, leading the team to a 22–3 record in his first season of 1989 and the state championship game in 1990.

In 1990, Murphy began studies for a master's degree in communications at the University of Southwestern Louisiana (now the University of Louisiana at Lafayette) and joined the Lady Cajuns softball team as an assistant coach, where he would stay until 1994. Simultaneously, he was also head baseball coach at Independence High School in Independence, Iowa, from 1992 to 1995.

After one year as interim head softball coach at Division II Northwest Missouri State in 1995, Murphy moved up to the Division I collegiate level as an assistant coach at Alabama from 1996 to 1998.

=== Alabama ===
Murphy built one of the most successful college softball programs, taking Alabama to thirteen Women's College World Series appearances (2000, '03, '05, '06, '08, '09, ‘11, '12, '14, '15, '16, '19, & '21) since 2000, which is only second in the NCAA to UCLA, having made 16 appearances in that span. He led the Crimson Tide to its first national championship in 2012. Murphy also served as the hitting coach for the Canadian National Team in the 2004 Olympics and as an assistant coach for the United States national softball team in the summer of 2009.

On June 9, 2011, Murphy announced that he was leaving Alabama to take the head coaching position at rival LSU. Three days later, before signing a contract at LSU, he changed his mind and returned to Alabama— saying Alabama is "where his heart was".

On March 9, 2018, Murphy reached his 1,000th career win, becoming only the 38th coach to reach 1,000 wins. At 20 seasons coaching, Murphy reached 1,000 wins faster than any other coach.

== Head coaching record ==
Record table
Season	Team	Overall	Conference	Standing	Postseason
Northwest Missouri State Bearcats (Mid-America Intercollegiate Athletics Association) (1995)
1995	Northwest Missouri State	28–20*	7–9		
Northwest Missouri State:		28–20 (.583)	7–9 (.438)	*Interim head coach.	
Alabama Crimson Tide (Southeastern Conference) (1999–Present)
1999	Alabama	39–26	19–11	2nd (West)	NCAA Regional
2000	Alabama	66–14	25–5	2nd (West)	Women's College World Series
2001	Alabama	50–11	24–6	2nd (West)	NCAA Regional
2002	Alabama	46–21	22–8	2nd (West)	NCAA Regional
2003	Alabama	49–21	22–8	1st (West)	Women's College World Series
2004	Alabama	45–20	18–12	3rd (West)	NCAA Regional
2005	Alabama	63–15	23–7	1st (West)	Women's College World Series
2006	Alabama	54–11	25–4	1st (West)	Women's College World Series
2007	Alabama	55–10	21–6	2nd (West)	NCAA Super Regional
2008	Alabama	58–8	25–3	1st (West)	Women's College World Series
2009	Alabama	54–11	21–6	1st (West)	Women's College World Series
2010	Alabama	52–11	23–4	1st (West)	NCAA Super Regional
2011	Alabama	53–11	19–6	1st (West)	Women's College World Series
2012	Alabama	60–8	23–5	1st (West)	Women's College World Series Champion
2013	Alabama	45–15	13–11	3rd (West)	NCAA Super Regional
2014	Alabama	53–13	19–5	1st	Women's College World Series Runner-Up
2015	Alabama	48–15	17–7	3rd	Women's College World Series
2016	Alabama	51–14	16–8	5th	Women's College World Series
2017	Alabama	46–18	12–11	5th	NCAA Super Regional
2018	Alabama	36–20	12–12	T-7th	NCAA Super Regional
2019	Alabama	60–10	18–6	1st	Women's College World Series
2020	Alabama	14–8 (Note: The season was not played past March 8 due to the COVID-19 pandemic in the United States.)	2–1		Postseason not held
2021	Alabama	52–9	18–6	3rd	Women's College World Series
2022	Alabama	44–13	16–8	2nd	NCAA Regional
2023	Alabama	45–22	14–10	5th	Women's College World Series
2024	Alabama	39–20	10–14	9th	Women's College World Series
2025	Alabama	40–21	12–12	T-10th	NCAA Super Regional
2026	Alabama	56–9	19–5	2nd	Women's College World Series
Alabama:		1,373–405 (.772)	517–207 (.714)		
Total:		1,401–425 (.767)			
National champion Postseason invitational champion Conference regular season champion Conference regular season and conference tournament champion Division regular season champion Division regular season and conference tournament champion Conference tournament champion

== Academic degrees ==
- Northern Iowa, 1988 B.S. in History Education
- University of Southwestern Louisiana (now University of Louisiana at Lafayette), 1992, M.S. in Mass Communication

== See also ==
- List of college softball coaches with 1,000 wins
- National Fastpitch Coaches Association Hall of Fame
