= List of Mississippi State Bulldogs softball seasons =

This is a list of Mississippi State Bulldogs softball seasons. The Mississippi State Bulldogs softball program is a college softball team that represents Mississippi State University in the Southeastern Conference of the National Collegiate Athletic Association.

The Bulldogs have appeared in the NCAA Division I softball tournament twenty times, advancing to the Super Regionals twice and the Women's College World Series in 2026.

== Season results ==
National champions	Women's College World Series berth	NCAA Tournament berth	Conference Tournament Champions	Conference Regular Season Champions

Season	Head coach	Conference	Season results									Tournament results	
Season	Head coach	Conference	Overall				Conference					Conference (Note: The format and number of teams participating in the SEC softball tournament have varied since it was established in 1997.)	Postseason (Note: Postseason play involving the NCAA Division I softball championship, established in 1982.)
Season	Head coach	Conference	Wins	Losses	Ties	%	Wins	Losses	Ties	%	Finish	Conference	Postseason
Mississippi State Bulldogs
1982	Lynn Keiser	Independent	2	18	0	.100	N/A						
1983	Lynn Keiser	Independent	6	13	0	.316	N/A						
1984	Vivian Langley	Independent	11	20	0	.355	N/A						
1985	Vivian Langley	Independent	28	12	0	.700	N/A						
1986	Vivian Langley	Independent	27	11	0	.711	N/A						
1987–1996	No team												
1997	Kathy Arendsen	SEC	29	27	0	.518	11	17	0	.393	5th, West	—	—
1998	Kathy Arendsen	SEC	36	21	0	.632	15	11	0	.577	3rd, West	Runner-up	—
1999	Kathy Arendsen	SEC	38	29	0	.567	15	15	0	.500	4th, West	Semifinals	—
2000	Kathy Arendsen	SEC	44	27	0	.620	17	13	0	.567	4th, West	Quarterfinals	NCAA Regional
2001	Kathy Arendsen	SEC	36	26	0	.581	19	11	0	.633	3rd, West	Quarterfinals	—
2002	Kathy Arendsen	SEC	36	31	0	.537	13	16	0	.448	5th, West	Quarterfinals	NCAA Regional
2003	Jay Miller	SEC	34	30	0	.531	13	16	0	.448	4th, West	0–2	NCAA Regional
2004	Jay Miller	SEC	39	26	0	.600	14	15	0	.483	4th, West	Quarterfinals	NCAA Regional
2005	Jay Miller	SEC	35	31	0	.530	12	18	0	.400	T-3rd, West	Quarterfinals	NCAA Regional
2006	Jay Miller	SEC	33	28	0	.541	7	22	0	.241	6th, West	—	—
2007	Jay Miller	SEC	35	27	0	.565	14	14	0	.500	3rd, West	0–1	NCAA Regional
2008	Jay Miller	SEC	41	22	0	.651	13	14	0	.481	4th, West	0–1	NCAA Regional
2009	Jay Miller	SEC	28	28	0	.500	8	19	0	.296	5th, West	—	NCAA Regional
2010	Jay Miller	SEC	26	29	0	.473	7	20	0	.259	6th, West	—	—
2011	Jay Miller	SEC	24	32	0	.429	10	18	0	.357	4th, West	0–1	—
2012	Vann Stuedeman	SEC	33	24	0	.579	12	16	0	.429	T-3rd, West	0–1	NCAA Regional
2013	Vann Stuedeman	SEC	33	24	0	.579	8	16	0	.333	5th, West	—	NCAA Regional
2014	Vann Stuedeman	SEC	39	21	0	.650	10	14	0	.417	10th	0–1	NCAA Regional
2015	Vann Stuedeman	SEC	36	21	0	.632	10	14	0	.417	10th	0–1	NCAA Regional
2016	Vann Stuedeman	SEC	26	31	0	.456	3	21	0	.125	12th	0–1	—
2017	Vann Stuedeman	SEC	36	22	0	.621	10	14	0	.417	9th	0–1	NCAA Regional
2018	Vann Stuedeman	SEC	38	23	0	.623	7	17	0	.292	11th	Quarterinals	NCAA Regional
2019	Vann Stuedeman	SEC	35	23	0	.603	9	15	0	.375	12th	1–1	NCAA Regional
2020	Samantha Ricketts	SEC	25	3	0	.893	Season canceled due to COVID-19 pandemic						
2021	Samantha Ricketts	SEC	35	25	0	.583	8	15	0	.348	9th	Quarterfinals	NCAA Regional
2022	Samantha Ricketts	SEC	37	27	0	.578	10	14	0	.417	11th	Quarterfinals	NCAA Super Regional
2023	Samantha Ricketts	SEC	28	25	0	.528	7	16	0	.304	11th	0–1	—
2024	Samantha Ricketts	SEC	34	20	0	.630	12	12	0	.500	6th	0–1	NCAA Regional
2025	Samantha Ricketts	SEC	39	19	0	.672	13	11	0	.542	8th	0–1	NCAA Regional
2026	Samantha Ricketts	SEC	43	21	0	.672	9	15	0	.375	10th	1–1	WCWS, 0–2
