= List of Tennessee Lady Volunteers softball seasons =

The following is a list of Tennessee Lady Volunteers softball seasons. The University of Tennessee is a member of the Southeastern Conference of the NCAA Division I. The Lady Vols began varsity play in 1996. They have won three regular season and three SEC softball tournament championships, appeared in 23 NCAA Regionals, 15 Super Regionals, 10 Women's College World Series, and twice finished as the national runner-up.

National champions	Women's College World Series berth	NCAA Tournament berth	Conference Tournament Champions	Conference Regular Season Champions

Season	Head coach	Conference	Season results									Tournament results	
Season	Head coach	Conference	Overall				Conference					Conference	Postseason
Season	Head coach	Conference	Wins	Losses	Ties	%	Wins	Losses	Ties	%	Finish	Conference	Postseason
1996	Jim Beitia	Independent	54	14	0	.794	N/A						—
1997	Jim Beitia	SEC	45	22	0	.672	20	7	0	.741	2nd East		—
1998	Jim Beitia	SEC	37	31	0	.544	13	15	0	.464	3rd East		—
1999	Jim Beitia	SEC	44	27	0	.620	17	11	0	.607	T-1st East		NCAA Regional
2000	Jim Beitia	SEC	29	34	0	.460	5	22	0	.185	5th East		—
2001	Jim Beitia	SEC	24	35	0	.407	9	20	0	.310	5th East		—
2002	Karen Weekly and Ralph Weekly	SEC	35	25	1	.582	8	17	0	.320	4th East		—
2003	Karen Weekly and Ralph Weekly	SEC	45	25	0	.643	14	15	0	.483	4th East		—
2004	Karen Weekly and Ralph Weekly	SEC	55	16	0	.775	20	8	0	.714	1st East	Semifinals	NCAA Regional
2005	Karen Weekly and Ralph Weekly	SEC	67	15	0	.817	20	8	0	.714	2nd East		WCWS Third Place
2006	Karen Weekly and Ralph Weekly	SEC	61	12	0	.836	21	9	0	.700	2nd East	SEC tournament champions	WCWS Third Place
2007	Karen Weekly and Ralph Weekly	SEC	63	8	0	.887	23	4	0	.852	1st (1st East)		WCWS Runner-up
2008	Karen Weekly and Ralph Weekly	SEC	50	16	0	.758	14	12	0	.538	2nd East	Semifinals	NCAA Regional
2009	Karen Weekly and Ralph Weekly	SEC	40	18	1	.686	12	12	1	.500	3rd East	Semifinals	NCAA Regional
2010	Karen Weekly and Ralph Weekly	SEC	49	15	0	.766	17	8	0	.680	3rd East	Semifinals	WCWS Third Place
2011	Karen Weekly and Ralph Weekly	SEC	49	12	0	.803	20	8	0	.714	2nd East	SEC tournament champions	NCAA Regional
2012	Karen Weekly and Ralph Weekly	SEC	52	14	0	.788	22	6	0	.786	1st East	Semifinal	WCWS 7th Place
2013	Karen Weekly and Ralph Weekly	SEC	52	12	0	.813	16	6	0	.727	2nd East	Semifinal	WCWS Runner-up
2014	Karen Weekly and Ralph Weekly	SEC	46	12	0	.793	17	7	0	.708	2nd		NCAA Super Regional
2015	Karen Weekly and Ralph Weekly	SEC	47	17	0	.734	15	9	0	.625	T-4th	Runner-up	WCWS 7th Place
2016	Karen Weekly and Ralph Weekly	SEC	43	16	0	.729	16	7	0	.696	T-3rd	Semifinal	NCAA Regional
2017	Karen Weekly and Ralph Weekly	SEC	48	12	0	.800	16	7	0	.696	T-3rd		NCAA Super Regional
2018	Karen Weekly and Ralph Weekly	SEC	48	14	0	.774	14	10	0	.583	4th	Semifinal	NCAA Super Regional
2019	Karen Weekly and Ralph Weekly	SEC	43	17	0	.717	14	10	0	.583	T-2nd		NCAA Super Regional
2020	Karen Weekly and Ralph Weekly	SEC	14	9	0	.609	Season canceled due to COVID-19 pandemic						
2021	Karen Weekly and Ralph Weekly	SEC	42	15	0	.737	12	11	0	.522	7th	Semifinal	NCAA Regional
2022	Karen Weekly	SEC	41	18	0	.695	15	8	0	.652	3rd	Semifinal	NCAA Regional
2023	Karen Weekly	SEC	51	10	0	.836	19	5	0	.792	1st	SEC tournament champions	WCWS Third Place
2024	Karen Weekly	SEC	44	12	0	.786	19	5	0	.792	1st		NCAA Regional
2025	Karen Weekly	SEC	47	17	0	.734	15	9	0	.625	4th		WCWS Third Place
2026	Karen Weekly	SEC	49	12	0	.803	16	8	0	.667	T-4th	Second round	WCWS Third Place
