= List of Florida Gators softball seasons =

The following is a list of Florida Gators softball seasons. The University of Florida is a member of the Southeastern Conference of the NCAA Division I. The Gators began varsity play in 1997. They have won nine regular season and six SEC softball tournament championships, appeared in 26 NCAA Regionals, 17 Super Regionals, 13 Women's College World Series, won national championships in 2014 and 2015, and finished as the national runner-up three times.

National champions	Women's College World Series berth	NCAA Tournament berth	Conference Tournament Champions	Conference Regular Season Champions

Season	Head coach	Conference	Season results									Tournament results	
Season	Head coach	Conference	Overall				Conference					Conference	Postseason
Season	Head coach	Conference	Wins	Losses	Ties	%	Wins	Losses	Ties	%	Finish	Conference	Postseason
1997	Larry Ray	SEC	42	25	0	.627	16	8	0	.667	3rd East		—
1998	Larry Ray	SEC	47	22	0	.681	23	5	0	.821	1st (1st East)		NCAA Regional
1999	Larry Ray	SEC	34	29	0	.540	13	15	0	.464	3rd East		—
2000	Larry Ray	SEC	46	30	0	.605	13	14	0	.481	2nd East		NCAA Regional
2001	Karen Johns	SEC	37	28	0	.569	14	15	0	.483	2nd East		NCAA Regional
2002	Karen Johns	SEC	32	35	0	.478	12	18	0	.400	3rd East		—
2003	Karen Johns	SEC	41	25	0	.621	19	11	0	.633	3rd East		NCAA Regional
2004	Karen Johns	SEC	41	20	0	.672	16	13	0	.552	3rd East		NCAA Regional
2005	Karen Johns	SEC	41	23	0	.641	18	12	0	.641	3rd East		NCAA Regional
2006	Tim Walton	SEC	43	25	0	.632	17	13	0	.567	3rd East		NCAA Regional
2007	Tim Walton	SEC	50	20	0	.714	17	11	0	.607	2nd East	Runner-up	NCAA Super Regional
2008	Tim Walton	SEC	70	5	0	.933	27	1	0	.964	1st (1st East)	SEC Tournament champion	WCWS
2009	Tim Walton	SEC	63	5	0	.926	26	1	0	.963	1st (1st East)	SEC Tournament champion	WCWS Runner-up
2010	Tim Walton	SEC	49	10	0	.831	20	4	0	.833	1st East	Semifinals	WCWS
2011	Tim Walton	SEC	56	13	0	.812	21	7	0	.750	1st East		WCWS Runner-up
2012	Tim Walton	SEC	48	13	0	.787	21	7	0	.750	2nd East	Runner-up	NCAA Regional
2013	Tim Walton	SEC	58	9	0	.866	18	6	0	.750	1st (1st East)	SEC Tournament champion	WCWS
2014	Tim Walton	SEC	55	12	0	.821	15	9	0	.625	3rd		National Champions
2015	Tim Walton	SEC	60	7	0	.896	18	5	0	.783	1st (1st East)	Semifinal	National Champions
2016	Tim Walton	SEC	56	7	0	.889	20	4	0	.833	1st	Semifinal	NCAA Super Regional
2017	Tim Walton	SEC	58	10	0	.853	20	3	0	.870	1st		WCWS Runner-up
2018	Tim Walton	SEC	56	11	0	.836	20	4	0	.833	1st	SEC Tournament champion	WCWS
2019	Tim Walton	SEC	49	18	0	.731	12	12	0	.500	6th	SEC Tournament champion	WCWS
2020	Tim Walton	SEC	23	4	0	.852	3	0	0	1.000	Season canceled due to COVID-19 pandemic		
2021	Tim Walton	SEC	45	11	0	.804	19	5	0	.792	T-1st	Runner-up	NCAA Super Regional
2022	Tim Walton	SEC	49	19	0	.721	13	11	0	.542	T-4th	Semifinal	WCWS
2023	Tim Walton	SEC	38	22	0	.633	11	13	0	.458	8th		NCAA Regional
2024	Tim Walton	SEC	54	15	0	.783	17	7	0	.708	2nd	SEC Tournament champion	WCWS
2025	Tim Walton	SEC	48	17	0	.738	14	10	0	.583	T-5th		WCWS
2026	Tim Walton	SEC	52	12	0	.813	17	7	0	.708	3rd	Semifinal	NCAA Super Regional
