= Stephanie Brombacher =

Florida Gators – No. 32
- Pitcher
- Born: March 6, 1989 (age 36); Pembroke Pines, Florida
- Batted: Right Threw: Right

NCAA debut
- February 8, 2008, for the Florida Gators

Last appearance
- June 7, 2011, for the Florida Gators

Career statistics
- Win–loss record: 97–11
- Earned run average: 1.50
- Strikeouts: 683
- Shutouts: 38
- Complete Games: 60
- Innings Pitched: 678.0

Teams
- Florida Gators (2008–2011)

Stephanie Renee Brombacher (born March 6, 1989) is a former American collegiate softball pitcher for the University of Florida Gators. A 5'10" right-hander, Brombacher was a starting pitcher for the Gators from 2008 through 2011. Among all Gator pitchers, Brombacher ranks in the top ten for appearances, starts, innings pitched, wins, strikeouts, and earned run average as of 2017.

A three-time All-State pitcher and two-time state champion at American Heritage High School in Plantation, Florida, Brombacher signed with the Gators in November 2006 as part of head coach Tim Walton's second recruiting class as Florida. During the 2008 and 2009 seasons, Brombacher pitched alongside All-American ace Stacey Nelson. Following Nelson's graduation in 2009, Brombacher took over as the Gators' ace in 2010 and enjoyed career highs in starts, wins, and strikeouts. Of note, Brombacher did not lose a game in her first 64 appearances for the Gators (she was 42-0 as a freshman and sophomore) before she dropped her first start as a junior in 2010. She was also part of the Gators softball team that won 70 games in 2008, still a single-season wins record for a Division I team.

A four-time All-SEC selection, Brombacher also received All-America honors in 2009, 2010, and 2011. In addition to being a three-time member of the SEC Academic Honor Roll and a three-time Academic All-American, Brombacher was also named a candidate for the Senior CLASS Award for softball in 2011. Brombacher would go on to help lead the Gators softball teams to four SEC Eastern Division titles, two SEC championships, and SEC tournament titles in 2008 and 2009. She was part of the first senior class in SEC history to make four consecutive Women's College World Series appearances (2008-2011). Her Gators team garnered national runner-up finishes to Washington in 2009 and Arizona State in 2011.

== Career statistics ==
=== University of Florida ===
All stats courtesy of the Florida Gators.

YEAR	W	L	GP	GS	CG	SHO	SV	IP	H	R	ER	BB	SO	ERA
2008	20	0	30	24	10	5	3	140.0	107	37	28	25	123	2.07
2009	22	0	34	27	18	14	1	158.2	88	27	19	29	190	0.84
2010	35	8	47	40	23	12	0	226.1	181	77	65	81	237	2.01
2011	20	3	34	30	9	7	1	153.0	104	44	33	37	133	1.51
TOTALS	97	11	145	121	60	38	5	678.0	480	185	145	172	683	1.50
