= 2023 Southeastern Conference softball season =

2023 SEC Softball Season
- League: NCAA Division I
- Sport: Softball
- Teams: 13

Regular Season
- 2023 SEC Champions: Tennessee

Tournament
- Champions: Tennessee
- Runners-up: South Carolina
- Finals MVP: Kiki Milloy (Tennessee)

Softball seasons
- ← 2022 2024 →

2023 Southeastern Conference softball standings
	Conf.						Overall
Team	W		L		T	PCT	W		L		T	PCT
No. 3 Tennessee ‍†‍‡‍^{y}	19	–	5	–	0	.792	51	–	10	–	0	.836
No. 14 Georgia ‍‍‍^{y}	16	–	7	–	0	.696	42	–	15	–	0	.737
No. 20 Auburn ‍‍‍^{y}	15	–	9	–	0	.625	43	–	19	–	0	.694
No. 7 Alabama ‍‍‍^{y}	14	–	10	–	0	.583	45	–	22	–	0	.672
No. 17 Arkansas ‍‍‍^{y}	14	–	10	–	0	.583	40	–	19	–	0	.678
No. 16 LSU ‍‍‍^{y}	13	–	11	–	0	.542	42	–	17	–	0	.712
Texas A&M ‍‍‍^{y}	12	–	12	–	0	.500	35	–	21	–	0	.625
No. 21 Florida ‍‍‍^{y}	11	–	13	–	0	.458	38	–	22	–	0	.633
No. 24 Kentucky ‍‍‍^{y}	10	–	14	–	0	.417	31	–	22	–	1	.583
No. 25 South Carolina ‍‍‍^{y}	9	–	15	–	0	.375	40	–	22	–	0	.645
Ole Miss ‍‍‍^{y}	8	–	16	–	0	.333	32	–	28	–	0	.533
Mississippi State ‍‍‍	7	–	16	–	0	.304	28	–	25	–	0	.528
Missouri ‍‍‍^{y}	7	–	17	–	0	.292	35	–	26	–	0	.574
† – Conference champion ‡ – Tournament champion y – Invited to the NCAA tournament As of June 5, 2023; Rankings from NFCA/USA Today

The 2023 SEC softball season began play Thursday, February 9, and conference play began on Friday, March 10. Tennessee clinched the regular season conference championship on May 6. Tennessee also won the 2023 Southeastern Conference softball tournament which took place from May 9–13 at Bogle Park in Fayetteville, Arkansas. Vanderbilt University is the only full member of the Southeastern Conference to not sponsor a softball program. Of the 13 teams in the SEC, 12 played in the NCAA tournament. Of the top 16 seeds hosting Regionals, five are from the SEC. Three of the five win their Regionals, being the only SEC teams to win Regionals. Two of the three win their Super Regionals and advance to the 2023 Women's College World Series (WCWS).

== SEC preseason poll ==
The head coaches SEC preseason poll was released on January 26, 2023. Each head coach votes on a scale of 12 points for first place down to 1 point for last place, 12th. Each coach only votes for 12 teams, since they can not vote for their own team. Florida was picked to finish 1st, with five 1st place votes. Tennessee was 2nd with three 1st place votes, and Arkansas 3rd with the remaining five 1st place votes.

Preseason poll
Predicted finish	Team
1	Florida
2	Tennessee
3	Arkansas
4	Alabama
5	LSU
6	Georgia
7	Kentucky
8	Missouri
9	Auburn
10	Ole Miss
11	Mississippi State
12	Texas A&M
13	South Carolina

== Record vs. conference opponents ==
Date m/dd is for last scheduled game of series. Blank are not scheduled. Blue are home games, otherwise away.

2023 SEC softball records Source: 2023 SEC softball game results, 2023 SEC softball schedule
Team	W–L	ALA	ARK	AUB	FLA	UGA	KEN	LSU	MSU	MIZZ	MISS	SCAR	TENN	TAMU	Team	SR	SW
ALA	14–10		1–2	1–2	.	.	.	2–1	3–0	2–1	2–1	2–1	1–2	.	ALA	5–3	1–0
ARK	14–10	2–1		.	2–1	1–2	2–1	.	3–0	1–2	.	.	2–1	1–2	ARK	5–3	1–0
AUB	15–9	2–1	.		1–2	1–2	.	2–1	2–1	3–0	2–1	2–1	.	.	AUB	6–2	1–0
FLA	11–13	.	1–2	2–1		2–1	1–2	.	.	2–1	2–1	1–2	0–3	.	FLA	4–4	0–1
UGA	16–7	.	2–1	2–1	1–2		2–1	1–2	2–0	.	.	3–0	.	3–0	UGA	6–2	2–0
KEN	10–14	.	1–2	.	2–1	1–2		.	0–3	3–0	2–1	.	0–3	1–2	KEN	3–5	1–2
LSU	13–11	1–2	.	1–2	.	2–1	.		3–0	2–1	2–1	2–1	0–3	.	LSU	5–3	1–1
MSU	7–16	0–3	0–3	1–2	.	0–2	3–0	0–3		.	.	3–0	.	0–3	MSU	2–6	2–4
MIZZ	7–17	1–2	2–1	0–3	1–2	.	0–3	1–2	.		1–2	.	.	1–2	MIZZ	1–7	0–2
MISS	8–16	1–2	.	1–2	1–2	.	1–2	1–2	.	2–1		.	0–3	1–2	MISS	1–7	0–1
SCAR	9–15	1–2	.	1–2	2–1	0–3	.	1–2	0–3	.	.		1–2	3–0	SCAR	2–6	1–2
TENN	19–5	2–1	1–2	.	3–0	.	3–0	3–0	.	.	3–0	2–1		2–1	TENN	7–1	4–0
TAMU	12–12	.	2–1	.	.	0–3	2–1	.	3–0	2–1	2–1	0–3	1–2		TAMU	5–3	1–2
Team	W–L	ALA	ARK	AUB	FLA	UGA	KEN	LSU	MSU	MIZZ	MISS	SCAR	TENN	TAMU	Team	SR	SW

Updated for entire regular season. Tie brkrs: ARK>ALA hd to hd.

== National rankings ==
All games, for the weeks ending May 21 through June 9 were played in the NCAA tournament and the Women's College World Series (WCWS). The SEC had 12 of 13 teams play in the NCAA tournament, Mississippi State being the only team to not play. All playing, except for Kentucky and Missouri, made a Regional final and three, Tennessee, Alabama, and Georgia, won Regionals to advance to Super Regionals. Tennessee and Alabama won their Super Regionals to advance to the WCWS, while Georgia lost in a Super Regional. Finishes, e.g., 3rd, 7th, etc., are finishes in the NCAA tournament. They are not necessarily the same positions in any of the polls.

- Tennessee went 5–0 winning their Regional and Super Regional and went 2–2 in the WCWS to finish tied for 3rd with one other team.
- Alabama went 5–2 winning their Regional and Super Regional and went 0–2 in the WCWS to finish tied for 7th with one other team.
- Georgia went 3–0 winning their Regional and 0–2 losing to Florida State in their Super Regional. Georgia finished tied for 9th with seven other teams.
- Arkansas went 2–2 losing their Regional to a ranked Oregon. Arkansas finished tied for 17th with fifteen other teams.
- LSU went 2–2 losing out to a ranked Louisiana in LSU's Regional, finishing tied for 17th with fifteen other teams.
- Auburn went 3–2 losing out to a ranked Clemson in Clemson's Regional. Auburn finished tied for 17th with fifteen other teams.
- Texas A&M went 2–2 losing out to a ranked Texas in Texas' Regional. Texas A&M finished tied for 17th with fifteen other teams.
- Florida went 2–2 losing out to a ranked Stanford in Stanford's Regional. Florida finished tied for 17th with fifteen other teams.
- Ole Miss went 2–2 losing out to a ranked Utah in Utah's Regional. Ole Miss finished tied for 17th with fifteen other teams.
- South Carolina went 3–2 losing out to an unranked UCF and a ranked Florida State in Florida State's Regional. South Carolina finished tied for 17th with fifteen other teams.
- Kentucky went 1–2 losing out to an unranked Miami (Ohio) and a ranked Northwestern in Northwestern's Regional. Kentucky finished tied for 33rd with fifteen other teams.
- Missouri went 1–2 losing out to an unranked California and a ranked Oklahoma in Oklahoma's Regional. Missouri finished tied for 33rd with fifteen other teams.

=== NFCA/USA Today ===
The 14th poll was after the conference tournaments and before the NCAA tournament. The 15th poll, after the NCAA tournament, is the final poll. See 2023 NCAA Division I softball rankings#NFCA/USA Today also.

Week	0	1	2	3	4	5	6	7	8	9	10	11	12	13	14	15	
TENN	13	11	12	7	7	5	4	4	5	7	4	3	4	4	4	3	TENN
ALA	9	15	11	13	13	16	16	17	16	16	14	16	14	14	12	7	ALA
UGA	15	12	17	18	19	18	17	15	14	12	12	11	11	13	14	14	UGA
LSU	25	18	15	15	14	12	15	14	12	13	15	13	15	11	11	16	LSU
ARK	7	4	7	6	6	9	12	10	8	10	11	12	12	12	13	17	ARK
AUB	21	21	20	19	18	19	21	19	19	21	19	17	17	16	16	20	AUB
FLA	4	3	3	8	8	8	8	11	15	15	13	14	16	18	20	21	FLA
KEN	20	17	18	17	16	14	13	16	17	17	20	20	23	22	22	24	KEN
TAMU	–	–	–	–	–	24	–	25	24	23	25	25	25	–	–	–	TAMU
MIZZ	–	–	24	24	25	–	–	–	–	–	–	–	–	–	–	–	MIZZ
MSU	23	–	–	–	–	–	–	–	–	–	–	–	–	–	–	–	MSU
MISS	–	–	–	–	–	–	–	–	–	–	–	–	–	–	–	–	MISS
SCAR	–	–	–	–	–	–	–	–	–	–	–	–	–	–	–	–	SCAR

=== D1Softball ===
The 13th poll was after the end of the regular season, before the conference tournaments, then the 14th poll, after the NCAA tournament, is the final poll. See 2023 NCAA Division I softball rankings#D1Softball also.

Week	0	1	2	3	4	5	6	7	8	9	10	11	12	13	14	
TENN	12	9	11	4	4	4	3	3	4	7	3	3	4	4	4	TENN
ALA	6	12	6	12	10	19	15	16	15	15	13	16	14	16	8	ALA
UGA	10	8	14	18	18	18	9	8	8	6	7	7	6	7	11	UGA
ARK	8	4	10	8	9	15	17	12	9	12	11	13	12	14	17	ARK
LSU	17	17	12	9	8	8	10	11	10	11	14	12	15	9	18	LSU
AUB	19	23	18	20	22	24	–	–	–	–	20	15	13	15	20	AUB
TAMU	–	25	19	22	21	13	20	15	14	14	21	22	23	22	23	TAMU
FLA	5	3	4	13	13	10	11	18	–	23	18	21	22	–	–	FLA
KEN	16	15	16	14	17	9	8	14	17	19	23	24	–	–	–	KEN
SCAR	–	–	–	–	–	–	–	–	–	–	25	–	–	–	–	SCAR
MIZZ	–	–	25	24	–	–	–	–	–	–	–	–	–	–	–	MIZZ
MISS	25	–	–	–	–	–	–	–	–	–	–	–	–	–	–	MISS
MSU	–	–	–	–	–	–	–	–	–	–	–	–	–	–	–	MSU

=== ESPN/USA Softball Collegiate ===
The 14th poll was after the conference tournaments and before the NCAA tournament. The 15th poll, after the NCAA tournament, is the final poll. See 2023 NCAA Division I softball rankings#ESPN.com/USA Softball Collegiate Top 25 also.

Week	0	1	2	3	4	5	6	7	8	9	10	11	12	13	14	15	
TENN	12	8	9	6	5	5	3	3	5	6	4	3	4	4	4	4	TENN
ALA	7	12	7	9	9	13	13	14	14	14	13	16	14	13	11	7	ALA
UGA	13	10	16	16	18	17	16	10	8	9	11	11	10	11	12	12	UGA
ARK	6	4	8	7	7	12	17	11	9	11	12	12	12	12	13	17	ARK
AUB	21	21	20	21	21	22	25	23	23	24	21	17	15	15	17	19	AUB
LSU	20	18	14	15	14	10	12	12	11	12	15	14	16	14	15	20	LSU
FLA	5	3	3	10	12	11	10	13	18	15	14	15	17	21	20	21	FLA
SCAR	–	–	–	–	–	–	–	–	–	–	–	–	–	–	–	23	SCAR
TAMU	–	–	–	25	–	21	24	21	19	21	24	23	23	23	25	–	TAMU
KEN	17	16	18	17	16	14	11	16	15	16	20	22	–	–	–	–	KEN
MIZZ	23	23	21	23	23	–	–	–	–	–	–	–	–	–	–	–	MIZZ
MSU	–	–	–	–	–	–	–	–	–	–	–	–	–	–	–	–	MSU
MISS	–	–	–	–	–	–	–	–	–	–	–	–	–	–	–	–	MISS

== All-SEC teams ==
On May 12, SEC officials announced their softball awards for the 2023 season. Skylar Wallace of Florida was selected as Player of the Year, Maddie Penta of Auburn was named Pitcher of the Year, and Karlyn Pickens of Tennessee was Freshman of the Year, and Karen Weekly of Tennessee was chosen as the Coach of the Year.

The All-SEC Teams consist of 21 student-athletes on the First Team, 21 student-athletes on the Second Team, and a nine-member All-Defensive Team:

=== All-SEC First Team ===
- Montana Fouts, Alabama
- Ashley Prange, Alabama
- Chenise Delce, Arkansas
- Maddie Penta, Auburn
- Charla Echols, Florida
- Skylar Wallace, Florida
- Jayda Kearney, Georgia
- Sydney Kuma, Georgia
- Sara Mosley, Georgia
- Shelby Walters, Georgia
- Erin Coffel, Kentucky
- Kayla Kowalik, Kentucky
- Ali Kilponen, LSU
- Ali Newland, LSU
- Donnie Gobourne, South Carolina
- McKenna Gibson, Tennessee
- Kiki Milloy, Tennessee
- Zaida Puni, Tennessee
- Ashley Rogers, Tennessee
- Julia Cotrrill, Texas A&M
- Rylen Wiggins, Texas A&M

=== All-SEC Second Team ===
- Jenna Johnson, Alabama
- Larissa Preuitt, Alabama
- Hannah Camenzind, Arkansas
- Kristina Foreman, Arkansas
- Cylie Halvorson, Arkansas
- Rylin Hedgecock, Arkansas
- Reagan Johnson, Arkansas
- Denver Bryant, Auburn
- Nelia Peralta, Auburn
- Kendra Falby, Florida
- Reagan Walsh, Florida
- Jaiden Fields, Georgia
- Madison Kerpics, Georgia
- Sydney Berzon, LSU
- Ciara Briggs, LSU
- Taylor Pleasants, LSU
- McKenzie Redoutey, LSU
- Alex Honnold, Missouri
- Jenna Laird, Missouri
- Karlyn Pickens, Tennessee
- Koko Wooley, Texas A&M

=== SEC All-Defensive Team ===
- Pitcher: Maddie Penta, Auburn
- Catcher: Kayla Kowalik, Kentucky
- First Base: Raeleen Gutierrez, LSU
- Second Base: Sydney Kuma, Georgia
- Shortstop: Taylor Pleasants, LSU
- Third Base: Charla Echols, Florida
- Left Field: Tate Whitley, Ole Miss
- Center Field: Ciara Briggs, LSU
- Right Field: McKenzie Redoutey, LSU
