= Arkansas Razorbacks softball =

Women's college softball team

Arkansas Razorbacks Softball
- 2026 Arkansas Razorbacks softball team
- Founded: 1997; 29 years ago
- University: University of Arkansas
- Athletic director: Hunter Yurachek
- All-time Record: 929–826–1 (.529)
- Head coach: Courtney Deifel (11th season)
- Conference: SEC
- Location: Fayetteville, Arkansas
- Home stadium: Bogle Park (capacity: 3,200)
- Nickname: Razorbacks
- Colors: Cardinal and white

NCAA WCWS appearances
- 2026

NCAA super regional appearances
- 2018, 2021, 2022, 2025, 2026

NCAA Tournament appearances
- 2000, 2002, 2008, 2009, 2012, 2013, 2017, 2018, 2019, 2021, 2022, 2023, 2024, 2025, 2026

Conference tournament championships
- 2022

Regular-season conference championships
- 2021, 2022

The Arkansas Razorbacks softball team represents the University of Arkansas in NCAA Division I College softball. The team competes in the Southeastern Conference, and plays its home games at Bogle Park in Fayetteville, Arkansas. The Razorbacks are currently led by head coach Courtney Deifel.

Arkansas has won their conference title two times and has been to the NCAA Tournament 15 times.

== History ==
The Razorbacks made the NCAA tournament for the first time in 2000. They beat Cal-State Northridge at the Norman regional marking their first ever tournament win.

Between 2002 and 2011 they appeared in four NCAA tournaments. In 2012, the Razorbacks upset #1 seed California in the Berkeley regional before being defeated in back-to-back losses against the Golden Bears. They appeared in the tournament once again in 2013 with two wins against Fordham in the Norman regional.

In 2018, the Razorbacks hosted their first regional and won against DePaul and Wichita State. From there, they went to #4 Oklahoma for their first-ever Super Regionals appearance where they lost in two games.

In 2021, the Razorbacks hosted their regional as the No. 6 overall seed and beat Manhattan, South Dakota State, and Stanford. They advanced to host their super regional against Arizona, which they lost in two games. In 2022, the Razorbacks posted a program-best 48 win season, winning both the SEC regular season and conference tournament, earning them the No. 4 overall seed. They hosted their regional and beat Princeton and Oregon. In the Fayetteville super region, the Razorback lost to Texas in three games.

=== Bogle Park ===
The Arkansas Razorbacks opened Bogle Park in 2008, replacing Lady'Back Field. The stadium's seating capacity is 3,200, though additional seating is available behind the outfield. The stadium is named after Bob and Marilyn Bogle.

=== Head coaches ===
Years	Coach	Record	%
1997–2004	Carie Dever-Boaz	244–274–1	.471
2005–2009	Jamie Pinkerton	130–179	.421
2010–2015	Mike Larabee	149–181	.452
2016–present	Courtney Deifel	406-192	.679

== Championships ==
=== Conference championships ===
Season	Conference	Record	Head coach
2021	SEC	19–5	Courtney Deifel
2022	SEC	19-5	Courtney Deifel

=== Conference tournament championships ===
Season	Conference	Tournament location	Head coach
2022	SEC	Gainesville, FL	Courtney Deifel

== Records and results ==
=== Year-by-year results ===
National champions	Women's College World Series berth	NCAA Tournament berth	Conference Tournament Champions	Conference Regular Season Champions

Season	Head coach	Conference	Season results									Postseason result		Sources
Season	Head coach	Conference	Overall				Conference					Postseason result		Sources
Season	Head coach	Conference	Wins	Losses	Ties	%	Wins	Losses	Ties	%	Finish	Conference	Postseason	Sources
1997	Carrie Dever-Boaz	Southeastern Conference	16	42	0	.276	12	16	0	.429	4th (Western)	-	-	
1998	Carrie Dever-Boaz	Southeastern Conference	21	38	0	.356	13	17	0	.433	4th (Western)	T-7th	-	
1999	Carrie Dever-Boaz	Southeastern Conference	46	29	0	.613	17	13	0	.567	3rd (Western)	2nd	-	
2000	Carrie Dever-Boaz	Southeastern Conference	44	31	0	.587	19	11	0	.633	3rd (Western)	3rd	Regional	
2001	Carrie Dever-Boaz	Southeastern Conference	36	30	0	.545	14	16	0	.467	4th (Western)	T-3rd	-	
2002	Carrie Dever-Boaz	Southeastern Conference	39	28	1	.582	14	16	0	.467	4th (Western)	T-7th	Regional	
2003	Carrie Dever-Boaz	Southeastern Conference	24	36	0	.400	8	22	0	.267	T-5th (Western)	-	-	
2004	Carrie Dever-Boaz	Southeastern Conference	18	40	0	.310	6	24	0	.200	6th (Western)	-	-	
2005	Jamie Pinkerton	Southeastern Conference	19	43	0	.306	4	25	0	.138	6th (Western)	-	-	
2006	Jamie Pinkerton	Southeastern Conference	26	35	0	.426	10	19	0	.345	4th (Western)	T-5th	-	
2007	Jamie Pinkerton	Southeastern Conference	21	43	0	.328	6	22	0	.214	6th (Western)	-	-	
2008	Jamie Pinkerton	Southeastern Conference	37	29	0	.561	8	20	0	.286	6th (Western)	-	Regional	
2009	Jamie Pinkerton	Southeastern Conference	27	29	0	.482	10	16	0	.385	3rd (Western)	T-5th	Regional	
2010	Mike Larabee	Southeastern Conference	28	29	0	.491	10	18	0	.357	3rd (Western)	T-5th	-	
2011	Mike Larabee	Southeastern Conference	13	39	0	.250	3	23	0	.115	T-5th (Western)	-	-	
2012	Mike Larabee	Southeastern Conference	29	28	0	.509	7	21	0	.250	6th (Western)	-	Regional	
2013	Mike Larabee	Southeastern Conference	36	20	0	.643	12	10	0	.545	2nd (Western)	T-5th	Regional	
2014	Mike Larabee	Southeastern Conference	27	28	0	.491	5	19	0	.208	11th	-	-	
2015	Mike Larabee	Southeastern Conference	16	37	0	.302	1	23	0	.042	12th	-	-	
2016	Courtney Deifel	Southeastern Conference	17	39	0	.304	1	23	0	.042	12	-	-	
2017	Courtney Deifel	Southeastern Conference	31	24	0	.564	7	17	0	.292	11th	T-9th	Regional	
2018	Courtney Deifel	Southeastern Conference	42	17	0	.712	12	12	0	.500	6th	T-3rd	Super Regional	
2019	Courtney Deifel	Southeastern Conference	38	20	0	.655	12	12	0	.500	7th	T-9th	Regional	
2020	Courtney Deifel	Southeastern Conference	19	6	0	.760	Season cancelled due to COVID-19 pandemic in the United States							
2021	Courtney Deifel	Southeastern Conference	43	11	0	.796	19	5	0	.796	1st	T-5th	Super Regional	
2022	Courtney Deifel	Southeastern Conference	48	11	0	.814	19	5	0	.792	1st	1st	Super Regional	
2023	Courtney Deifel	Southeastern Conference	40	19	0	.678	14	10	0	.583	5th	T-5th	Regional	
2024	Courtney Deifel	Southeastern Conference	37	18	0	.673	14	10	0	.583	4th	T-5th	Regional	
2025	Courtney Deifel	Southeastern Conference	44	14	0	.759	14	10	0	.583	5th	T-3rd	Super Regional	

=== Records by opponent ===
As of May 23, 2026
SEC Conference opponents

Opponent	TM	W–L	Last meeting
Alabama	85	17–68	L 1–7; May 7, 2026
Auburn	78	39–39	W 4–1; April 6, 2026
Florida	74	21–53	W 6–4; March 29, 2026
Georgia	70	28–42	W 6–0; March 8, 2026
Kentucky	68	40–28	W 2–1; March 30, 2025
LSU	83	19–64	W 6–0; May 3, 2025
Mississippi State	80	39–41	W 3–0; May 6, 2026
Missouri	34	15–19	L 1-3; April 26, 2026
Oklahoma	34	3–31	L 1–11 ^{(5)} April 19, 2026
Ole Miss	81	44–37	L 4–7; May 25, 2025
South Carolina	71	32–39	W 5–4; April 13, 2025
Tennessee	67	24–43	W 6–1; May 8, 2025
Texas	12	3–9	L 1-4 May 2, 2026
Texas A&M	30	7–23	L 0–2 April 27, 2025

Notable Non-Conference opponents

Opponent	TM	W–L	Last meeting
Central Arkansas	11	9–2	W 11–2 ^{(6)} March 24, 2026
Missouri State	45	26–19	W 12–0 ^{(5)} March 9, 2026

== Coaching Staff ==
Name	Position	Seasons at Arkansas
Courtney Deifel	Head coach	11th
Matt Meuchel	Associate head coach and Pitching Coach	10th
Justin Shults	Associate head coach and Hitting Coach	1st
Parker Staggs	Assistant coach	1st
Dan Bartosik	Director of Operations	4th

== Individual honors and awards ==
This is a list of individual honors at the national and conference levels, including All-Americans.

=== National awards ===
USA Softball Collegiate Player of the Year

- Bri Ellis (2025)

Softball America Player of the Year

- Bri Ellis (2025)

=== Conference awards ===
SEC Player of the Year

- KB Sides (2022)
- Bri Ellis (2025)

SEC Pitcher of the Year

- Mary Haff (co-) (2021)
- Chenise Delce (2022)

SEC Freshman of the Year

- Devon Wallace (2012)

SEC Coach of the Year

- Carie Dever-Boaz (1999)
- Courtney Deifel (2021, 2022)

=== NFCA All-American ===
Season	Player(s)
2010	Miranda Dixon
2019	Autumn Storms
2021	Braxton Burnside, Mary Haff, Danielle Gibson
2022	Hannah Gammill, Danielle Gibson, Linnie Malkin, KB Sides, Chenise Delce
2023	Rylin Hedgecock, Chenise Delce
2024	Bri Ellis, Morgan Lenistock
2025	Bri Ellis, Ella McDowell
2026	Ella McDowell, Robyn Herron

== See also ==
- List of NCAA Division I softball programs
