= 2021 Southeastern Conference softball season =

2021 SEC Softball Season
- League: NCAA Division I
- Sport: Softball
- Teams: 13

Regular Season
- Champions: Florida

Tournament
- Champions: Alabama
- Runners-up: Florida

Softball seasons
- ← 2020 2022 →

2021 Southeastern Conference softball standings
	Conf.				Overall
Team	W		L	PCT	W		L	PCT
No. 9 Florida ‍†‍‍^{y}	19	–	5	.792	45	–	11	.804
No. 11 Arkansas ‍†‍‍^{y}	19	–	5	.792	43	–	11	.796
No. 3 Alabama ‍‍‡‍^{y}	18	–	6	.750	52	–	9	.852
No. 13 Missouri ‍‍‍^{y}	15	–	9	.625	42	–	17	.712
No. 16 Kentucky ‍‍‍^{y}	13	–	11	.542	43	–	16	.729
No. 15 LSU ‍‍‍^{y}	13	–	11	.542	35	–	22	.614
No. 22 Tennessee ‍‍‍^{y}	12	–	11	.522	42	–	15	.737
Ole Miss ‍‍‍^{y}	12	–	12	.500	36	–	22	.621
Mississippi State ‍‍‍^{y}	8	–	15	.348	35	–	25	.583
Texas A&M ‍‍‍^{y}	8	–	16	.333	32	–	23	.582
No. 8 Georgia ‍‍‍^{y}	7	–	17	.292	34	–	23	.596
Auburn ‍‍‍^{y}	7	–	17	.292	27	–	24	.529
South Carolina ‍‍‍	4	–	20	.167	26	–	26	.500
† – Conference champion ‡ – Tournament champion y – Invited to the NCAA tournament As of June 7, 2021; Rankings from NFCA/USA Today

The 2021 SEC softball season began play Thursday, February 11, and conference play began on Thursday, March 11. The 2021 Southeastern Conference softball tournament was May 11–13 at Rhoads Stadium in Tuscaloosa, Alabama. Alabama played Florida in the tournament final, winning by a score of 4–0. Vanderbilt University is the only full member of the Southeastern Conference to not sponsor a softball program.

== SEC preseason poll ==
The head coaches SEC preseason poll was released on January 28, 2021. Each head coach votes on a scale of 12 points for first place down to 1 point for last place, 12th. Each coach only votes for 12 teams, since they can not vote for their own team. Alabama was picked to finish 1st, with nine 1st place votes. LSU was 2nd with two 1st place votes, Florida 3rd with one, and Tennessee 4th with the remaining one 1st place vote.

Preseason poll
Predicted finish	Team
1	Alabama
2	LSU
3	Florida
4	Tennessee
5	Kentucky
6	Arkansas
7	Georgia
8	Missouri
9	South Carolina
10	Mississippi State
11	Auburn
12	Texas A&M
13	Ole Miss

== Record vs. conference opponents ==
Date m/dd is for last scheduled game of series. Blank are not scheduled. Blue are home games, otherwise away.

2021 SEC softball records Source: 2021 SEC softball game results, 2021 SEC softball schedule
Team	W–L	ALA	ARK	AUB	FLA	UGA	KEN	LSU	MSU	MIZZ	MISS	SCAR	TENN	TAMU	Team	SR	SW
ALA	18–6		2–1	3–0	1–2	3–0	1–2	.	.	.	3–0	.	2–1	3–0	ALA	6–2	4–0
ARK	19–5	1–2		3–0	.	3–0	.	2–1	3–0	1–2	3–0	3–0	.	.	ARK	6–2	5–0
AUB	7–17	0–3	0–3		.	.	2–1	1–2	.	1–2	1–2	.	0–3	2–1	AUB	2–6	0–3
FLA	19–5	2–1	.	.		2–1	2–1	3–0	3–0	2–1	.	2–1	.	3–0	FLA	8–0	3–0
UGA	7–17	0–3	0–3	.	1–2		2–1	.	0–3	2–1	1–2	.	1–2	.	UGA	2–6	0–3
KEN	13–11	2–1	.	1–2	1–2	1–2		1–2	.	.	.	3–0	1–2	3–0	KEN	3–5	2–0
LSU	13–11	.	1–2	2–1	0–3	.	2–1		.	2–1	2–1	.	2–1	2–1	LSU	6–2	0–1
MSU	8–15	.	0–3	.	0–3	3–0	.	.		0–3	0–3	2–1	2–0	1–2	MSU	3–5	1–4
MIZZ	15–9	.	2–1	2–1	1–2	1–2	.	1–2	3–0		.	3–0	2–1	.	MIZZ	5–3	2–0
MISS	12–12	0–3	0–3	2–1	.	2–1	.	1–2	3–0	.		2–1	.	2–1	MISS	5–3	1–2
SCAR	4–20	.	0–3	.	1–2	.	0–3	.	1–2	0–3	1–2		1–2	0–3	SCAR	0–8	0–4
TENN	12–11	1–2	.	3–0	.	2–1	2–1	1–2	0–2	1–2	.	2–1		.	TENN	4–4	1–0
TAMU	8–16	0–3	.	1–2	0–3	.	0–3	1–2	2–1	.	1–2	3–0	.		TAMU	2–6	1–3
Team	W–L	ALA	ARK	AUB	FLA	UGA	KEN	LSU	MSU	MIZZ	MISS	SCAR	TENN	TAMU	Team	SR	SW

Updated for entire regular season.Tiebrkrs: FLA>ARK ALA common. LSU>KEN hd–hd. UGA>AUB MIZZ common.

== National rankings ==
At some time during the season, all thirteen SEC softball teams were ranked in the top 25 of two of the three major polls. The final rankings had 7 or 8 teams in the top 25. Twelve teams made the NCAA Tournament.

- Alabama, for 15 weeks straight was, and finished, in the top 5, having won the SEC softball tournament and made the semifinals of the Women's College World Series (WCWS).
- Georgia was unranked and rose to 8th, being the only other SEC team to make the WCWS. Only eight teams nationwide made the WCWS.
- Florida was in the top ten of every poll throughout the 2021 campaign. They made the championship game of the SEC tournament, losing to Alabama, and lost in their Super Regional to Georgia, just missing making the WCWS.
- Arkansas also lost their Super Regional, also just missing out on the WCWS.
- Missouri lost their Super Regional.
- LSU lost their Super Regional.
- Kentucky lost to Alabama in Alabama's Super Regional.
- Tennessee lost their Regional 1–2.
- South Carolina went 0–1 in the SEC tournament.
- Mississippi State went 1–1 in the SEC tournament and went 2–2 losing in the finals of a Regional.
- Ole Miss went 0–1 in the SEC tournament and also went 2–2 losing in the finals of a Regional.
- Texas A&M went 0–1 in the SEC tournament and went 1–2 losing in the finals of a Regional.

=== NFCA/USA Today ===
See 2021 NCAA Division I softball rankings#NFCA/USA Today also.

Week	0	1	2	3	4	5	6	7	8	9	10	11	12	13	14	15	
ALA	8	5	4	3	4	3	4	4	4	3	5	4	3	3	3	3	ALA
UGA	14	16	19	19	18	19	17	20	20	20	21	21	22	–	–	8	UGA
FLA	7	6	6	5	6	5	5	5	5	5	3	3	4	4	4	9	FLA
ARK	18	20	21	20	19	17	15	13	10	10	8	10	8	6	5	11	ARK
MIZZ	23	21	20	18	17	16	18	17	19	18	18	15	15	15	14	13	MIZZ
LSU	5	8	11	13	12	12	13	15	17	16	17	16	16	16	16	15	LSU
KEN	13	12	12	10	9	9	7	8	11	12	14	17	18	17	19	16	KEN
TENN	–	–	–	25	22	21	21	21	21	19	19	18	17	19	18	23	TENN
SCAR	19	19	18	17	20	24	23	–	–	–	–	–	–	–	–	–	SCAR
AUB	–	–	–	24	21	22	24	–	–	–	–	–	–	–	–	–	AUB
MSU	20	22	–	–	–	–	–	–	–	–	–	–	–	–	–	–	MSU
MISS	–	–	–	–	–	–	–	–	–	–	–	–	–	–	–	–	MISS
TAMU	–	–	–	–	–	–	–	–	–	–	–	–	–	–	–	–	TAMU

=== D1Softball ===
See 2021 NCAA Division I softball rankings#D1Softball also.

Week	0	1	2	3	4	5	6	7	8	9	10	11	12	13	14	15	
ALA	8	5	3	3	6	4	5	4	4	3	5	4	3	4	3	3	ALA
UGA	13	18	–	24	19	19	17	–	25	24	–	–	–	–	–	8	UGA
FLA	6	6	6	7	8	8	6	5	5	4	3	3	4	3	4	10	FLA
ARK	16	17	16	15	12	13	12	9	8	9	7	8	8	7	6	11	ARK
MIZZ	23	15	17	17	18	18	19	18	17	17	16	12	12	12	12	13	MIZZ
LSU	5	7	12	11	10	10	9	12	15	13	12	11	11	9	9	14	LSU
KEN	24	20	15	14	13	14	11	10	11	12	17	17	16	15	16	15	KEN
TENN	21	23	–	–	23	23	22	24	19	18	19	18	17	22	21	22	TENN
MISS	–	–	–	–	–	–	–	–	–	–	24	23	22	21	21	–	MISS
TAMU	–	–	–	–	–	–	–	25	–	–	–	–	–	–	–	–	TAMU
MSU	15	16	18	–	–	–	–	–	–	–	–	–	–	–	–	–	MSU
SCAR	25	24	25	–	–	–	–	–	–	–	–	–	–	–	–	–	SCAR
AUB	–	–	–	–	–	–	–	–	–	–	–	–	–	–	–	–	AUB

=== ESPN/USA Softball Collegiate ===
See 2021 NCAA Division I softball rankings#ESPN.com/USA Softball Collegiate Top 25 also.

Week	0	1	2	3	4	5	6	7	8	9	10	11	12	13	14	15	
ALA	8	6	3	2	4	2	3	4	3	3	5	4	3	3	3	3	ALA
UGA	14	16	20	21	21	20	18	23	22	20	22	22	24	–	–	8	UGA
FLA	6	5	5	5	5	5	5	5	5	4	3	3	4	4	4	9	FLA
ARK	21	25	24	20	19	17	15	11	8	10	6	7	6	6	6	11	ARK
MIZZ	24	21	19	17	18	18	20	20	19	19	19	15	16	15	14	14	MIZZ
LSU	5	9	13	12	12	12	11	15	15	15	15	14	13	14	15	15	LSU
KEN	13	12	12	11	10	10	7	7	11	12	14	17	17	16	16	16	KEN
TENN	23	23	23	19	17	19	19	18	16	16	17	16	15	17	19	24	TENN
MISS	–	–	–	–	–	–	–	–	–	–	–	–	25	24	25	–	MISS
TAMU	–	–	–	–	–	–	–	24	25	–	–	–	–	–	–	–	TAMU
AUB	–	–	–	23	22	23	25	25	–	–	–	–	–	–	–	–	AUB
SCAR	19	20	18	18	20	24	23	–	–	–	–	–	–	–	–	–	SCAR
MSU	22	24	25	–	–	–	–	–	–	–	–	–	–	–	–	–	MSU
