= List of Florida Gators head softball coaches =

The Florida Gators softball program is a college softball team that represents the University of Florida in the Southeastern Conference. The Gators compete in the National Collegiate Athletic Association (NCAA) Division I. The current head coach is Tim Walton, who coached his first season in 2006.

The first season of softball at Florida was in 1997. The team has had three recorded head coaches.

The Gators have appeared in the Women's College World Series 13 times, won two national championships, and finished as the runner-up three times.

== Key ==
General
#	Number of coaches (Note: A running total of the number of head coaches.)
GC	Games coached

Overall
OW	Wins
OL	Losses
OT	Ties
O%	Winning percentage

Conference
CW	Wins
CL	Losses
CT	Ties
C%	Winning percentage

Postseason (Note: Postseason play involving the NCAA Division I softball championship.)
PA	Total appearances (Note: Postseason appearances include seasons with NCAA Division I softball championship bids.)
PW	Total wins
PL	Total losses
WA	Women's College World Series appearances (Note: Women's College World Series appearances include seasons with WCWS bids.)
WW	Women's College World Series wins
WL	Women's College World Series losses

Championships
DC	Division regular season (Note: The SEC used a divisional format from 1997–2013. The division winner with the highest record was named SEC regular season champion.)
CC	Conference regular season
CT	Conference tournament (Note: The SEC softball tournament began in 1997.)

== Coaches ==
List of head Softball coaches showing season(s) coached, overall records, conference records, postseason records, and championships. (Note: Statistics correct as of the end of the 2025 college softball season.)
#	Name	Term	GC	OW	OL	OT	O%	CW	CL	CT	C%	PA	PW	PL	WA	WW	WL	DCs	CCs	CTs	NCs
1	Larry Ray	1997-2000	275	169	106	0	.615	65	42	0	.607	2	2	4	—	—	—	1	1	—	—
2	Karen Johns	2001-2005	323	192	131	0	.594	79	69	0	.534	4	3	8	—	—	—	—	—	—	—
3	Tim Walton	2006-present	1,283	1,028	255	0	.801	349	133	0	.724	19	80	22	13	30	24	5	8	6	2
