= 2023 Tennessee Lady Volunteers softball team =

American college softball season

2023 Tennessee Lady Volunteers softball

SEC regular season & tournament champion NCAA Knoxville Regional champion

Women's College World Series
- Conference: Southeastern Conference
- Record: 44–8 (19–5 SEC)
- Head coach: Karen Weekly (21st season)
- Home stadium: Sherri Parker Lee Stadium

2023 Southeastern Conference softball standings
	Conf.						Overall
Team	W		L		T	PCT	W		L		T	PCT
No. 3 Tennessee ‍†‍‡‍^{y}	19	–	5	–	0	.792	51	–	10	–	0	.836
No. 14 Georgia ‍‍‍^{y}	16	–	7	–	0	.696	42	–	15	–	0	.737
No. 20 Auburn ‍‍‍^{y}	15	–	9	–	0	.625	43	–	19	–	0	.694
No. 7 Alabama ‍‍‍^{y}	14	–	10	–	0	.583	45	–	22	–	0	.672
No. 17 Arkansas ‍‍‍^{y}	14	–	10	–	0	.583	40	–	19	–	0	.678
No. 16 LSU ‍‍‍^{y}	13	–	11	–	0	.542	42	–	17	–	0	.712
Texas A&M ‍‍‍^{y}	12	–	12	–	0	.500	35	–	21	–	0	.625
No. 21 Florida ‍‍‍^{y}	11	–	13	–	0	.458	38	–	22	–	0	.633
No. 24 Kentucky ‍‍‍^{y}	10	–	14	–	0	.417	31	–	22	–	1	.583
No. 25 South Carolina ‍‍‍^{y}	9	–	15	–	0	.375	40	–	22	–	0	.645
Ole Miss ‍‍‍^{y}	8	–	16	–	0	.333	32	–	28	–	0	.533
Mississippi State ‍‍‍	7	–	16	–	0	.304	28	–	25	–	0	.528
Missouri ‍‍‍^{y}	7	–	17	–	0	.292	35	–	26	–	0	.574
† – Conference champion ‡ – Tournament champion y – Invited to the NCAA tournament As of June 5, 2023; Rankings from NFCA/USA Today

The 2023 Tennessee Lady Volunteers softball team was an American softball team that represented the University of Tennessee during the 2023 Southeastern Conference softball season and the 2023 NCAA Division I softball season. The team played their home games at Sherri Parker Lee Stadium in Knoxville, Tennessee, and was coached by Karen Weekly in her 21st season. The team won the Southeastern Conference regular season and tournament, which earned them an automatic bid to the NCAA Division I tournament.

In May, Weekly was named SEC Softball Coach of the Year, and pitcher Karlyn Pickens was named SEC Softball Freshman of the Year.

== Roster and personnel ==
2023 Tennessee Lady Volunteers roster
Pitchers: 14 – Ashley Rogers – Redshirt Senior; 17 – Ryleigh White – Junior; 23 – Karlyn Pickens – Freshman; 28 – Nicola Simpson – Sophomore; 33 – Payton Gottshall – Senior; 80 – Charli Orsini – Freshman; Outfielders: 1 – Katie Taylor – Sophomore; 8 – Brylee Mesusan – Freshman; 9 – Kiki Milloy – Senior; 19 – Jamison Brockenbrough – Freshman; 21 – Shakara Goodloe – Senior	Infielders: 2 – Lair Beautae – Sophomore; 3 – Taylor Pantell – Freshman; 6 – Jenna Mosley – Freshman; 11 – Zaida Puni – Junior; 16 – Camryn Sarvis – Freshman; 24 – McKenna Gibson – Sophomore; 36 – Grace Keene – Sophomore; Utility: 5 – Rylie West – Junior; 12 – Mackenzie Donihoo – Senior; 27 – Giulia Koutsoyanopulos – Junior; 34 – Destiny Rodriguez – Freshman; 50 – Jackie Kirkpatrick – Freshman; 88 – Amanda Ahlin – Freshman

2023 Lady Volunteers coaching staff
- Karen Weekly – Head coach
- Chris Malveaux – Assistant coach
- Megan Rhodes Smith – Assistant coach
- Kate Malveaux – Volunteer assistant
- Lori Mitchell – Director of softball operations
- Aubrey Leach – Graduate assistant
- Ralph Weekly– Special advisor

== Record vs. conference opponents ==
Date m/dd is for last scheduled game of series. Blank are not scheduled. Blue are home games, otherwise away.

2023 SEC softball records Source: 2023 SEC softball game results, 2023 SEC softball schedule
Team	W–L	ALA	ARK	AUB	FLA	UGA	KEN	LSU	MSU	MIZZ	MISS	SCAR	TENN	TAMU	Team	SR	SW
ALA	14–10		1–2	1–2	.	.	.	2–1	3–0	2–1	2–1	2–1	1–2	.	ALA	5–3	1–0
ARK	14–10	2–1		.	2–1	1–2	2–1	.	3–0	1–2	.	.	2–1	1–2	ARK	5–3	1–0
AUB	15–9	2–1	.		1–2	1–2	.	2–1	2–1	3–0	2–1	2–1	.	.	AUB	6–2	1–0
FLA	11–13	.	1–2	2–1		2–1	1–2	.	.	2–1	2–1	1–2	0–3	.	FLA	4–4	0–1
UGA	16–7	.	2–1	2–1	1–2		2–1	1–2	2–0	.	.	3–0	.	3–0	UGA	6–2	2–0
KEN	10–14	.	1–2	.	2–1	1–2		.	0–3	3–0	2–1	.	0–3	1–2	KEN	3–5	1–2
LSU	13–11	1–2	.	1–2	.	2–1	.		3–0	2–1	2–1	2–1	0–3	.	LSU	5–3	1–1
MSU	7–16	0–3	0–3	1–2	.	0–2	3–0	0–3		.	.	3–0	.	0–3	MSU	2–6	2–4
MIZZ	7–17	1–2	2–1	0–3	1–2	.	0–3	1–2	.		1–2	.	.	1–2	MIZZ	1–7	0–2
MISS	8–16	1–2	.	1–2	1–2	.	1–2	1–2	.	2–1		.	0–3	1–2	MISS	1–7	0–1
SCAR	9–15	1–2	.	1–2	2–1	0–3	.	1–2	0–3	.	.		1–2	3–0	SCAR	2–6	1–2
TENN	19–5	2–1	1–2	.	3–0	.	3–0	3–0	.	.	3–0	2–1		2–1	TENN	7–1	4–0
TAMU	12–12	.	2–1	.	.	0–3	2–1	.	3–0	2–1	2–1	0–3	1–2		TAMU	5–3	1–2
Team	W–L	ALA	ARK	AUB	FLA	UGA	KEN	LSU	MSU	MIZZ	MISS	SCAR	TENN	TAMU	Team	SR	SW

Updated for entire regular season. Tie brkrs: ARK>ALA hd to hd.
