= Tony Baldwin =

American softball coach

Current position
- Title: Head coach
- Team: Georgia
- Record: 163–75 (.685)

Biographical details
- Born: March 20, 1973 (age 53); Bloomington, Indiana, U.S.
- Education: Butler

Coaching career (HC unless noted)
- 1994–1999: Butler (asst.)
- 1999: Decatur Blues
- 1999–2005: Dartmouth (asst.)
- 2006–2008: Michigan State (asst.)
- 2011–2012: Georgia (asst.)
- 2012–2014: North Carolina (asst.)
- 2014–2021: Georgia (asst.)
- 2021–present: Georgia

Head coaching record
- Overall: 163–75–0 (.685)
- Tournaments: 12–10 (.545)

Tony Baldwin (born March 20, 1973) is an American softball coach and currently the head coach for the Georgia Bulldogs softball team.

== Early life and education ==
Tony Baldwin was born on March 20, 1973, in Bloomington, Indiana. Baldwin later chose to attend Butler University. While at Butler, Baldwin was a team captain for the Bulldogs and earned All-MCC honors.

== Coaching career ==
=== Decatur Blues ===
After a stint as an assistant coach for Butler, Baldwin served as head coach for the Decatur Blues, a member of the Central Illinois Collegiate League.

=== Georgia Bulldogs ===
After his tenure as Decatur Blues head coach, and other stints at Michigan State, Georgia, and North Carolina, Baldwin became the head coach for the Georgia Bulldogs. He replaced Lu Harris-Champer, whom he coached under for years.

== Head coaching record ==
Record table
Season	Team	Overall	Conference	Standing	Postseason
Georgia Bulldogs (Southeastern Conference) (2022–present)
2022	Georgia	43–18	12–12	8th	NCAA Regional
2023	Georgia	42–15	16–7	2nd	NCAA Super Regional
2024	Georgia	43–19	12–12	7th	NCAA Super Regional
2025	Georgia	35–23	6–14	12th	NCAA Super Regional
2026	Georgia	38–17	12–12	9th	NCAA Super Regional
Total:		201–92 (.686)			
National champion Postseason invitational champion Conference regular season champion Conference regular season and conference tournament champion Division regular season champion Division regular season and conference tournament champion Conference tournament champion

== Personal life ==
Baldwin is married to his wife, Suzanne, and has four children: Ella, Abby, Brady, and Katie.
