= Danielle Gibson =

Danielle Gibson may refer to:

- Danielle Gibson (cricketer) (born 2001), English cricketer
- Danielle Gibson (softball), American softball player
