= Courtney Deifel =

American softball catcher (born 1980)

Current position
- Title: Head coach
- Team: Arkansas
- Conference: SEC
- Record: 406–192 (.679)
- Annual salary: $375,000

Biographical details
- Born: November 24, 1980 (age 45); Merced, California, U.S.
- Education: California

Playing career
- 2000–2003: California

Coaching career (HC unless noted)
- 2008–2009: Oklahoma (GA)
- 2009–2010: Maryland (assistant)
- 2011–2014: Louisville (assistant)
- 2015: Maryland
- 2016–present: Arkansas

Head coaching record
- Overall: 433–219 (.664)
- Tournaments: NCAA: 22–18 (.550)

Accomplishments and honors

Championships
- NCAA Super Regional Championship (2026); 5× NCAA Regional Championships (2018, 2021, 2022, 2025, 2026); 2× SEC Regular Season Champions (2021, 2022); SEC tournament (2022)

Awards
- 2× SEC Coach of the Year (2021, 2022)

Courtney Scott Deifel (born Courtney Lynn Scott; November 24, 1980) is an American former collegiate softball catcher and current head coach at Arkansas.

== Personal ==
Deifel graduated from the University of California, Berkeley in 2003 with a Bachelor of Arts degree in American Business and Globalism and American Studies. She earned her Master of Arts degree in Human Relations from the University of Oklahoma in 2008 while she was a graduate assistant with the Sooners softball team. Deifel's sister, Amanda Scott, is currently the head softball coach at Missouri–St. Louis and won a Women's College World Series title at Fresno State in 1998.

Deifel and her husband, Joe, are the parents of two sons, Trip and Walt.

== Career ==
Deifel played college softball for the California Golden Bears from 2000 to 2003, winning a national championship in 2002 and batting .263 (218/827) with 13 home runs and 127 RBIs for her career.

== Head coaching record ==
Record table
Season	Team	Overall	Conference	Standing	Postseason
Maryland (Big Ten Conference) (2015–present)
2015	Maryland	27–27	9–14	6th	
Maryland:		27–27 (.500)	9–14 (.391)		
Arkansas (Southeastern Conference) (2016–present)
2016	Arkansas	17–39	1–23	13th	
2017	Arkansas	31–24	7–17	12th	NCAA Regional
2018	Arkansas	42–17	12–12	7th	NCAA Super Regional
2019	Arkansas	38–20	12–12	T-6th	NCAA Regional
2020	Arkansas	19–6 (Note: The season was not played past March 10 due to the COVID-19 pandemic.)	1–2	—	Postseason not held
2021	Arkansas	43–11	19–5	T–1st	NCAA Super Regional
2022	Arkansas	48–11	19–5	1st	NCAA Super Regional
2023	Arkansas	40–19	14–10	4th	NCAA Regional
2024	Arkansas	37–18	14–10	4th	NCAA Regional
2025	Arkansas	44–14	14–10	5th	NCAA Super Regional
2026	Arkansas	47-13	15–9	7th	Women's College World Series
Arkansas:		406–192 (.679)	128–115 (.527)		
Total:		433–219 (.664)			
National champion Postseason invitational champion Conference regular season champion Conference regular season and conference tournament champion Division regular season champion Division regular season and conference tournament champion Conference tournament champion
