= Yvette Girouard =

American softball coach (born 1954)

Biographical details
- Born: 1954 (age 71–72); Broussard, Louisiana, U.S.

Playing career

Volleyball
- 1972–1975: Southwestern Louisiana

Coaching career (HC unless noted)

Softball
- 1977–1979: Lafayette HS
- 1980: Comeaux HS
- 1981–2000: Southwestern Louisiana/Louisiana–Lafayette
- 2001–2011: LSU

Head coaching record
- Overall: 1,285–421–1 (.753)
- Tournaments: 51–43 (NCAA); 0–2 (NIT)

Accomplishments and honors

Championships
- Louisiana AIAW (1982); 2× Southland South Zone (1983, 1984); 3× Southland regular season (1985–1987); 2× Southland Tournament (1984, 1987); Sun Belt regular season (2000); 4× SEC West Division (2001, 2002, 2004, 2007); 4× SEC tournament (2001, 2002, 2004, 2007)

Awards
- 2× NFCA Coach of the Year (1990, 1993); NFCA Coaching Staff of the Year (2001); NFCA Hall of Fame (2005); 3× Southland Coach of the Year (1984, 1985, 1987); Sun Belt Coach of the Year (2000); 3× SEC Coach of the Year (2001, 2002, 2006)

Yvette Marie Girouard (born 1954) is an American retired softball coach who was head coach at Southwestern Louisiana from 1981 to 2000 and LSU from 2001 to 2011.

On March 15, 2019, at the Louisiana-Lafayette softball game vs. the Troy Trojans, Lamson Park was rededicated to Yvette Girouard. The park is now known as “Yvette Girouard Field at Lamson Park.”

== Early life and education ==
Born in Broussard, Louisiana, Girouard grew up in nearby Lafayette and graduated from Ovey Comeaux High School in 1972. She attended the University of Southwestern Louisiana (now the University of Louisiana at Lafayette). A member of the volleyball team from 1972 to 1975, Girouard graduated in 1976 with a B.S. in health and physical education.

== Coaching career ==
Girouard began the softball program at Lafayette High School in 1977. After three seasons at Lafayette High, Girouard was head coach at her alma mater Comeaux High in 1980 before starting the softball program at Southwestern Louisiana in 1981.

As head coach at Southwestern Louisiana Girouard had an overall 759–250 record from 1981 to 2000. Her teams advanced to 10 NCAA Tournaments, including three Women's College World Series, finishing third in 1993 and fifth in 1995 and 1996.

Girouard left the Ragin Cajuns in 2001 to take the reins of the LSU program. She finished her career at LSU with a 526-171-1 record. She led LSU to two Women's College World Series (third-place finishes in 2001 and 2004), three SEC championships (2001, 2002, and 2004), four SEC tournament championships (2001, 2002, 2004, and 2007), and two SEC tournament runner-up finishes (2003 and 2006). Her LSU teams played in seven NCAA tournaments.

Girouard is one of only three coaches to take two teams to the Women's College World Series. She was the National Fastpitch Coaches Association National Coach of the Year in 1990 and 1993; the Southland Conference Coach of the Year in 1984, 1985, and 1987; the Sun Belt Conference Coach of the Year in 2000; and the Southeastern Conference Coach of the Year in 2001, 2002, and 2006. She is also a 13-time winner of Louisiana Coach of the Year. Between her stints at Louisiana-Lafayette and LSU, her career record is 1,285-421-1.

Girouard was succeeded by former University of Louisiana at Lafayette head coach Michael Lotief and current LSU head coach Beth Torina.

Girouard was inducted into the National Fastpitch Coaches Association Hall of Fame in December 2005 and the Louisiana Softball Coaches Association Hall of Fame in June 2002.

== Head coaching record ==
Source for Southwestern Louisiana/Louisiana–Lafayette:

Source for LSU:

Record table
Season	Team	Overall	Conference	Standing	Postseason
Southwestern Louisiana Lady Cajuns (Louisiana AIAW) (1981–1982)
1981	Southwestern Louisiana	7–15			
1982	Southwestern Louisiana	15–13			LAIAW Champions
Southwestern Louisiana Lady Cajuns (Southland Conference) (1983–1987)
1983	Southwestern Louisiana	22–13	6–2	1st (South)	
1984	Southwestern Louisiana	28–9	6–2	1st (South)	
1985	Southwestern Louisiana	39–13	12–0	1st	
1986	Southwestern Louisiana	30–19	10–2	T–1st	
1987	Southwestern Louisiana	31–18	10–2	1st	NIT
Southwestern Louisiana Lady Cajuns (NCAA Division I independent) (1988–1999)
1988	Southwestern Louisiana	29–16			
1989	Southwestern Louisiana	48–16			
1990	Southwestern Louisiana	44–8			NCAA Regional
1991	Southwestern Louisiana	33–10			NCAA Regional
1992	Southwestern Louisiana	41–12			NCAA Regional
1993	Southwestern Louisiana	57–7			Women's College World Series
1994	Southwestern Louisiana	57–5			NCAA Regional
1995	Southwestern Louisiana	49–9			Women's College World Series
1996	Southwestern Louisiana	46–10			Women's College World Series
1997	Southwestern Louisiana	46–18			NCAA Regional
1998	Southwestern Louisiana	36–15			
1999	Southwestern Louisiana	54–11			NCAA Regional
Louisiana–Lafayette Lady Cajuns (Sun Belt Conference) (2000)
2000	Louisiana–Lafayette	45–15			NCAA Regional
Southwestern Louisiana / Louisiana–Lafayette:		759–250 (.752)	44–8 (.846)		
LSU Tigers (Southeastern Conference) (2001–2011)
2001	LSU	59–11	26–4	1st (West)	Women's College World Series
2002	LSU	56–11	25–4	1st (West)	NCAA Regional
2003	LSU	50–18	20–9	2nd (West)	NCAA Regional
2004	LSU	57–12	22–6	1st (West)	Women's College World Series
2005	LSU	31–23	12–18	T–3rd (West)	
2006	LSU	55–14	22–8	2nd (West)	NCAA Super Regional
2007	LSU	55–12	22–6	1st (West)	NCAA Super Regional
2008	LSU	44–18	17–11	2nd (West)	NCAA Regional
2009	LSU	34–18–1	15–10–1	2nd (West)	NCAA Regional
2010	LSU	45–16	20–8	2nd (West)	NCAA Regional
2011	LSU	40–18	19–9	2nd (West)	NCAA Regional
LSU:		526–171–1 (.754)	220–93–1 (.702)		
Total:		1,285–421–1 (.753)			
National champion Postseason invitational champion Conference regular season champion Conference regular season and conference tournament champion Division regular season champion Division regular season and conference tournament champion Conference tournament champion

== See also ==
- National Fastpitch Coaches Association Hall of Fame
- List of college softball coaches with 1,000 wins
