= 2014 SEC softball tournament =

2014 Southeastern Conference softball tournament
- Teams: 10
- Finals site: Carolina Softball Stadium; Columbia, SC
- Champions: Georgia (1st title)
- Runner-up: Kentucky (1st title game)
- Winning coach: Lu Harris-Champer (1st title)
- MVP: Chelsea Wilkinson (Georgia)
- Television: ESPNU; ESPN2

The 2014 SEC softball tournament was May 7 through 10th at Carolina Softball stadium in Columbia, South Carolina. Georgia ended up winning their first SEC softball tournament title over Kentucky.

== Tournament ==
1st Round; May 7th ESPNU
7 | Kentucky | 4
10 | Mississippi State | 3
8 | South Carolina | 5
9 | Auburn | 7

Quarterfinals; May 8th ESPNU
2 | Tennessee | 0
7 | Kentucky | 2
3 | Missouri | 0
6 | LSU | 6
4 | Florida | 0
5 | Georgia | 2
9 | Auburn | 4
1 | Alabama | 8

Semifinals; May 9th ESPNU
6 | LSU | 3
7 | Kentucky | 4
1 | Alabama | 3
5 | Georgia | 5

Finals; May 10th ESPN2
7 | Kentucky | 2
5 | Georgia | 5

- Arkansas, Ole Miss, and Texas A&M did not make the tournament. Vanderbilt does not sponsor a softball team.
