= 2012 Florida Gators softball team =

American college softball season

2012 Florida Gators softball
- Conference: Southeastern Conference
- East
- Head coach: Tim Walton
- Assistant coach: Jennifer Rocha, Jenny Gladding
- Home stadium: Katie Seashole Pressly Softball Stadium

The 2012 Florida Gators softball team represented the University of Florida softball program for the 2012 NCAA softball season.

== Roster ==
The 2012 Florida Gators softball team has 1 senior, 4 juniors, 3 sophomores, and 8 freshmen.

#	Name	Position	Height	B/T	Year	Hometown
4	Jessica Damico	UT	5-4		Fr	Gary Summit, MO
6	Kathlyn Medina	INF	5-4		Fr	Downey, CA
8	Alyssa Bache	RHP	5-10		Fr	Clearwater, FL
9	Kasey Fagan	UT	5-10		So	Dunnellon, FL
11	Ensley Gammel	RHP/UT	5-6	R/R	Jr	Bakersfield, CA
13	Hannah Rogers	RHP	5-10		So	Lake Wales, FL
15	Samantha Holle	INF	5-8	R/R	Jr	Tampa, FL
16	Michelle Moultrie	OF	5-3	L/R	Sr	Jacksonville, FL
17	Lauren Haeger	RHP/1B	5-11		Fr	Peoria, AZ
20	Kelsey Horton	C	5-10	R/R	Jr	Valrico, FL
23	Chelsea Howell	UT	5-4		RS-Fr	Plantation, FL
27	Cheyenne Coyle	SS	5-5		So	West Hills, CA
44	Brittany Schutte	UT	5-9	L/R	Jr	Fountain Valley, CA
51	Sami Fagan	UT	5-9		Fr	Dunnellon, FL
55	Briana Little	UT	5-4		Fr	Middleburg, FL
88	Bailey Castro	INF	5-17		Fr	Pembroke Pines, FL
