= Danielle Gibson Whorton =

American softball player

Personal information
- Nationality: American
- Height: 6 ft 0 in (1.83 m)
- Spouse: Mallie Whorton (m. 2021)

Sport
- Country: USA
- Sport: Softball
- College team: Arizona State Sun Devils (2018); Arkansas Razorbacks (2019–2022)
- Team: Blaze

Danielle Gibson Whorton is an American professional softball player for the Bandits of the Athletes Unlimited Softball League (AUSL). She played college softball at Arizona State and Arkansas.

== Early life ==
Gibson attended Murrieta Valley High School in Murrieta, California.

== Playing career ==
Gibson began her college softball career at Arizona State, where she played for one year, before transferring to Arkansas.

While playing for Arizona State in 2018, Gibson helped the Sun Devils 20 the 2018 Women's College World Series, where they lost to Oklahoma, 2–0. On February 23, 2019, while playing for Arkansas in a game against SIU Edwardsville, Gibson became the second person in NCAA history to hit for a "home run cycle;" hitting a solo home run, a two-run home run, a three-run home run and a grand slam in the same game.

On July 11, 2025, Gisbon Whorton was traded by the Blaze to the Bandits in exchange for Devyn Netz. Prior to being traded, she started all 15 games for the Blaze during the 2025 AUSL season, and posted a .340 average and .407 an on-base percentage with three doubles, two home runs, and 15 RBIs.

== Personal life ==
Gibson married Mallie Whorton in the summer of 2021.
