= Lu Harris-Champer =

American softball coach (born 1967)

Biographical details
- Born: June 16, 1967 (age 59); San Diego, California, U.S.
- Education: Western Illinois

Coaching career (HC unless noted)
- 1992–1996: Western Illinois (asst.)
- 1996–1997: Nicholls State
- 1998–2000: Southern Miss
- 2001–2021: Georgia

Head coaching record
- Overall: 1163–429–1 (.730)
- Tournaments: 85–51 (.625)

Accomplishments and honors

Championships
- As a Head Coach: Southland Regular Season Champions (1996); 2× Southland Tournament Champions (1996, 1997); Conference USA Regular Season Champions (2000); Conference USA Tournament Champions (2000); 2× SEC Regular Season Champions (2003, 2005); 3× SEC Eastern Division Champions (2003, 2005, 2006); SEC tournament Champions (2014); As an Assistant: Gateway Tournament Champions (1992); Mid Continent Regular Season Champions (1993); Mid Continent Tournament Champions (1993); Mid Continent West Division Champions (1996)

Awards
- 3× SEC Coach of the Year (2003, 2005, 2018); NFCA South Region Coach of the Year (1996, 1999); Southland Coach of the Year (1996)

Lu Harris-Champer (born June 16, 1967) is an American former softball coach who most recently served as the head coach at Georgia.

== Early life and education ==
Lu Harris-Champer was born in San Diego, California on June 16, 1967. She would later go on to graduate from Western Illinois University.

== Coaching career ==
=== Nicholls State ===
At Nicholls State, Harris-Champer had an overall record of 90–40–1 (.691) in her two years as head coach from 1996 to 1997.

=== Southern Miss ===
At Southern Miss, Harris-Champer had an overall record of 115–22 (.839) in her two years as head coach from 1999 to 2000.

=== Georgia ===
Harris-Champer has been the head softball coach of the Georgia Bulldogs softball team since 2001. On June 6, 2021, Harris-Champer announced her retirement. During her career at Georgia, she led the team to 959 victories, two Southeastern Conference championships (2003, 2005), one SEC Tournament title (2014), 19-straight NCAA Tournament appearances, 11 Super Regionals, and five trips to the Women's College World Series, including final four appearances in 2009 and 2010.

== Personal life ==
Lu is married to her husband Jerry, they have twin daughters, Jenna and Emma, and another daughter named Mya.

== Head coaching record ==
=== College ===
Record table
Season	Team	Overall	Conference	Standing	Postseason
Nicholls State Colonels (Southland Conference) (1996–1997)
1996	Nicholls State	42–17–1	19–5	1st	NCAA Regional
1997	Nicholls State	48–23	16–7	2nd	NCAA Regional
Nicholls State:		90–40–1 (.691)	35–12 (.745)		
Southern Miss Golden Eagles (Conference USA) (1998–2000)
1998	Southern Miss	No team			
1999	Southern Miss	51–9			Women's College World Series
2000	Southern Miss	63–13	16–1	1st	Women's College World Series
Southern Miss:		114–22 (.838)	16–1 (.941)		
Georgia Bulldogs (Southeastern Conference) (2001–Present)
2001	Georgia	33–26	9–18	4th (East)	
2002	Georgia	59–17	18–12	2nd (East)	NCAA Regional
2003	Georgia	57–14	23–6	1st (East)	NCAA Regional
2004	Georgia	55–17	20–10	2nd (East)	NCAA Regional
2005	Georgia	55–15	26–4	1st (East)	Athens Super Regional
2006	Georgia	54–15	24–6	1st (East)	Athens Regional
2007	Georgia	46–28	13–15	3rd (East)	Lincoln Regional
2008	Georgia	46–24	14–14	3rd (East)	Los Angeles Super Regional
2009	Georgia	47–12	18–7	2nd (East)	Women's College World Series
2010	Georgia	50–13	18–8	2nd (East)	Women's College World Series
2011	Georgia	51–14	17–9	3rd (East)	Athens Super Regional
2012	Georgia	45–17	17–11	3rd (East)	Knoxville Super Regional
2013	Georgia	40–21	14–9	4th (East)	Tempe Regional
2014	Georgia	49–15	15–9	T-3rd	Athens Super Regional
2015	Georgia	44–17	14–9	6th	Ann Arbor Super Regional
2016	Georgia	46–20	12–12	8th	Women's College World Series
2017	Georgia	35–23	6–18	13th	Tallahassee Regional
2018	Georgia	48–13	16–8	2nd	Women's College World Series
2019	Georgia	42–19	12–12	T-6th	Minneapolis Regional
2020	Georgia	23–5	2–1		Season canceled due to COVID-19
2021	Georgia	34–21	7–17	11th	Women's College World Series
Georgia:		959–367 (.723)	308–198 (.609)		
Total:		1163–429–1 (.730)			
National champion Postseason invitational champion Conference regular season champion Conference regular season and conference tournament champion Division regular season champion Division regular season and conference tournament champion Conference tournament champion
