= Mississippi State Bulldogs softball =

- 2026 Mississippi State Bulldogs softball team
- Founded: 1982 (44 years ago)
- University: Mississippi State University
- Head coach: Samantha Ricketts (7th season)
- Conference: SEC
- Location: Mississippi State, Mississippi, US
- Home stadium: Nusz Park (capacity: 1,100)
- Nickname: Bulldogs
- Colors: Maroon and white

NCAA WCWS appearances
- 2026

NCAA super regional appearances
- 2022, 2026

NCAA Tournament appearances
- 2000, 2002, 2003, 2004, 2005, 2007, 2008, 2009, 2012, 2013, 2014, 2015, 2017, 2018, 2019, 2021, 2022, 2024, 2025, 2026

The Mississippi State Bulldogs softball is the team which represents Mississippi State University in NCAA Division I college softball. The team currently participates in the Southeastern Conference (SEC). The Bulldogs are currently led by their head coach Samantha Ricketts. The team currently plays its home games at Nusz Park which is located on the university's campus. The Bulldogs have appeared in the NCAA Division I softball tournament 20 times, and advanced to the Women's College World Series once.

== Year-by-year results ==
Record table
Season	Coach	Overall	Conference	Standing	Postseason
Independent (1982–1986)
1982	Lynn Keiser	2–18	–		
1983	Lynn Keiser	6–13	–		
1984	Vivian Langley	11–20	–		
1985	Vivian Langley	28–14	–		
1986	Vivian Langley	27–11	–		
Southeastern Conference (1997–present)
1997	Kathy Arendsen	29–27	11–17	8th	
1998	Kathy Arendsen	36–21	15–11	T-4th	SEC tournament
1999	Kathy Arendsen	38–29	15–15	6th	SEC tournament
2000	Kathy Arendsen	44–27	17–13	4th	SEC tournament NCAA Regional
2001	Kathy Arendsen	36–26	19–11	3rd	SEC tournament
2002	Kathy Arendsen	36–31	13–16	7th	SEC tournament NCAA Regional
2003	Jay Miller	34–30	13–16	8th	SEC tournament NCAA Regional
2004	Jay Miller	39–26	14–15	7th	SEC tournament NCAA Regional
2005	Jay Miller	35–31	12–18	10th	SEC tournament NCAA Regional
2006	Jay Miller	33–28	7–22	10th	
2007	Jay Miller	35–27	14–14	5th	SEC tournament NCAA Regional
2008	Jay Miller	41–22	13–14	T-6th	SEC tournament NCAA Regional
2009	Jay Miller	28–28	8–19	9th	NCAA Regional
2010	Jay Miller	26–29	7–20	10th	
2011	Jay Miller	24–32	10–19	8th	SEC tournament
2012	Vann Stuedeman	33–24	12–16	T-7th	SEC tournament NCAA Regional
2013	Vann Stuedeman	32–24	8–16	T-10th	NCAA Regional
2014	Vann Stuedeman	39–21	10–14	10th	SEC tournament NCAA Regional
2015	Vann Stuedeman	36–21	10–14	T-9th	SEC tournament NCAA Regional
2016	Vann Stuedeman	26–31	3–21	12th	SEC tournament
2017	Vann Stuedeman	36–22	10–14	T-8th	SEC tournament NCAA Regional
2018	Vann Stuedeman	38–22	7–17	T-11th	SEC tournament NCAA Regional
2019	Vann Stuedeman	35–23	9–15	12th	SEC tournament NCAA Regional
2020	Samantha Ricketts	25–3	0-0		
2021	Samantha Ricketts	35–25	8–15	9th	SEC tournament NCAA Regional
2022	Samantha Ricketts	37–27	10–14	11th	SEC tournament NCAA Regional; NCAA Super Regional
2023	Samantha Ricketts	28–25	7–16	12th	SEC tournament
2024	Samantha Ricketts	34–20	12–12	T-6th	SEC tournament NCAA Regional
2025	Samantha Ricketts	39–19	13–11	T-6th	SEC tournament NCAA Regional
2026	Samantha Ricketts	43–21	9–15	T-10th	SEC tournament NCAA Regional; NCAA Super Regional; Women's College World Series
Total:		1,104–818	308–435		
National champion Postseason invitational champion Conference regular season champion Conference regular season and conference tournament champion Division regular season champion Division regular season and conference tournament champion Conference tournament champion

== Awards and honors ==
=== National awards ===
NFCA Golden Shoe Award

- Chelsea Bramlett (2009)
- Lisa Clemons (2002)

NFCA Catcher of the Year

- Keri McCallum (2000)
- Chelsea Bramlett (2008, 2009, 2010)
- Mia Davidson (2022)

=== Conference awards ===
SEC Player of the Year

- Iyhia McMichael (2003, 2004)

SEC Freshman of the Year

- Courtney Bures (2005)
- Chelsea Bramlett (2007)
- Mia Davidson (2018)

SEC Newcomer of the Year

- Alyssa Faircloth (2026)

=== NFCA All-Americans ===
Player	Year(s)	Position	Team
Keri McCallum	2000	Catcher	1st
Kellie Wilkerson	1999, 2000, 2001, 2002	At-Large (OF/P), At-Large (OF), Utility, At-Large (UT)	2nd, 1st, 1st, 2nd
Iyhia McMichael	2003, 2004	Outfield	1st
Courtney Bures	2005, 2008	Shortstop, At-Large-P	1st
Chelsea Bramlett	2007, 2008, 2009, 2010	UT/Non-P, Catcher(3)	1st
Fa Leilua	2019	UT/Non-P	2nd
Mia Davidson	2019, 2022	Catcher	3rd, 1st
Madisyn Kennedy	2024	At-Large(1B)	2nd
Sierra Sacco	2025	Outfield	1st

== Perfect games ==
The following two perfect games have been thrown by Mississippi State pitchers over the program's history.

- March 2, 1997. Jenny Hehnke vs Alabama State (won 18–0, 5 innings)
- February 9, 2018. Holly Ward vs Mississippi Valley State (won 10–0, 5 innings)

== See also ==
- List of NCAA Division I softball programs
