= 2023 SEC softball tournament =

Postseason collegiate softball tournament

2023 Southeastern Conference softball tournament
- Teams: 13
- Format: Single-elimination tournament
- Finals site: Bogle Park; Fayetteville, Arkansas
- Champions: Tennessee (3rd title)
- Runner-up: South Carolina (3rd title game)
- Winning coach: Karen Weekly (3rd title)
- MVP: Kiki Milloy (Tennessee)
- Television: SEC Network; ESPN2

2023 Southeastern Conference softball standings
	Conf.						Overall
Team	W		L		T	PCT	W		L		T	PCT
No. 3 Tennessee ‍†‍‡‍^{y}	19	–	5	–	0	.792	51	–	10	–	0	.836
No. 14 Georgia ‍‍‍^{y}	16	–	7	–	0	.696	42	–	15	–	0	.737
No. 20 Auburn ‍‍‍^{y}	15	–	9	–	0	.625	43	–	19	–	0	.694
No. 7 Alabama ‍‍‍^{y}	14	–	10	–	0	.583	45	–	22	–	0	.672
No. 17 Arkansas ‍‍‍^{y}	14	–	10	–	0	.583	40	–	19	–	0	.678
No. 16 LSU ‍‍‍^{y}	13	–	11	–	0	.542	42	–	17	–	0	.712
Texas A&M ‍‍‍^{y}	12	–	12	–	0	.500	35	–	21	–	0	.625
No. 21 Florida ‍‍‍^{y}	11	–	13	–	0	.458	38	–	22	–	0	.633
No. 24 Kentucky ‍‍‍^{y}	10	–	14	–	0	.417	31	–	22	–	1	.583
No. 25 South Carolina ‍‍‍^{y}	9	–	15	–	0	.375	40	–	22	–	0	.645
Ole Miss ‍‍‍^{y}	8	–	16	–	0	.333	32	–	28	–	0	.533
Mississippi State ‍‍‍	7	–	16	–	0	.304	28	–	25	–	0	.528
Missouri ‍‍‍^{y}	7	–	17	–	0	.292	35	–	26	–	0	.574
† – Conference champion ‡ – Tournament champion y – Invited to the NCAA tournament As of June 5, 2023; Rankings from NFCA/USA Today

The 2023 Southeastern Conference Softball Tournament, played for the 2023 Southeastern Conference softball season, is the postseason softball tournament that determined the 2023 champion of the Southeastern Conference. It was held at Bogle Park in Fayetteville, Arkansas from May 9–13, 2023. Tennessee won the tournament, earning the Southeastern Conference's automatic bid to the 2023 NCAA Division I Softball Tournament. All tournament games were televised on the SEC Network, with the semifinals and championship game broadcast on ESPN2 and ESPN, respectively.

== Format ==
All thirteen teams will be seeded based on conference winning percentage. They then will play a single-elimination tournament, with the top four seeds receiving a single bye, and the bottom two playing the first round game on May 9. The 13 team format has been the same since 2019.

== Record vs. conference opponents ==
Date m/dd is for last scheduled game of series. Blank are not scheduled. Blue are home games, otherwise away.

2023 SEC softball records Source: 2023 SEC softball game results, 2023 SEC softball schedule
Team	W–L	ALA	ARK	AUB	FLA	UGA	KEN	LSU	MSU	MIZZ	MISS	SCAR	TENN	TAMU	Team	SR	SW
ALA	14–10		1–2	1–2	.	.	.	2–1	3–0	2–1	2–1	2–1	1–2	.	ALA	5–3	1–0
ARK	14–10	2–1		.	2–1	1–2	2–1	.	3–0	1–2	.	.	2–1	1–2	ARK	5–3	1–0
AUB	15–9	2–1	.		1–2	1–2	.	2–1	2–1	3–0	2–1	2–1	.	.	AUB	6–2	1–0
FLA	11–13	.	1–2	2–1		2–1	1–2	.	.	2–1	2–1	1–2	0–3	.	FLA	4–4	0–1
UGA	16–7	.	2–1	2–1	1–2		2–1	1–2	2–0	.	.	3–0	.	3–0	UGA	6–2	2–0
KEN	10–14	.	1–2	.	2–1	1–2		.	0–3	3–0	2–1	.	0–3	1–2	KEN	3–5	1–2
LSU	13–11	1–2	.	1–2	.	2–1	.		3–0	2–1	2–1	2–1	0–3	.	LSU	5–3	1–1
MSU	7–16	0–3	0–3	1–2	.	0–2	3–0	0–3		.	.	3–0	.	0–3	MSU	2–6	2–4
MIZZ	7–17	1–2	2–1	0–3	1–2	.	0–3	1–2	.		1–2	.	.	1–2	MIZZ	1–7	0–2
MISS	8–16	1–2	.	1–2	1–2	.	1–2	1–2	.	2–1		.	0–3	1–2	MISS	1–7	0–1
SCAR	9–15	1–2	.	1–2	2–1	0–3	.	1–2	0–3	.	.		1–2	3–0	SCAR	2–6	1–2
TENN	19–5	2–1	1–2	.	3–0	.	3–0	3–0	.	.	3–0	2–1		2–1	TENN	7–1	4–0
TAMU	12–12	.	2–1	.	.	0–3	2–1	.	3–0	2–1	2–1	0–3	1–2		TAMU	5–3	1–2
Team	W–L	ALA	ARK	AUB	FLA	UGA	KEN	LSU	MSU	MIZZ	MISS	SCAR	TENN	TAMU	Team	SR	SW

Updated for entire regular season. Tie brkrs: ARK>ALA hd to hd.

== Bracket ==
First Round; Tuesday, May 9
12	Mississippi State	1
13	Missouri	3

Second Round; Wednesday, May 10
8	Florida	6
9	Kentucky	2
5	Alabama	7
13	Missouri	2
6	LSU	3
11	Ole Miss	5^{10}
7	Texas A&M	0
10	South Carolina	1^{8}

Quarterfinals; Thursday, May 11
1	Tennessee	4
8	Florida	0
4	Arkansas	2
5	Alabama	3^{9}
3	Auburn	8
11	Ole Miss	7
2	Georgia	1
10	South Carolina	2^{8}

Semifinals; Friday, May 12
1	Tennessee	7
5	Alabama	6
3	Auburn	2
10	South Carolina	3

Championship; Saturday, May 13
1	Tennessee	3
10	South Carolina	1

== Schedule ==
Game	Time*	Matchup^{#}	Score	Television	Attendance
First Round – Tuesday, May 9
1	6:30 p.m.	No. 13 Missouri vs. No. 12 Mississippi State	3–1	SEC Network	2,215
Second Round – Wednesday, May 10/Thursday, May 11
2	10:00 a.m.	No. 11 Ole Miss vs. No. 6 LSU	5−3^{10}	SEC Network	2,286
3	2:00 p.m.	No. 10 South Carolina vs. No. 7 Texas A&M	1−0^{8}	SEC Network	2,286
4	6:30 p.m.	No. 13 Missouri vs. No. 5 Alabama	2−7	SEC Network	2,413
5	11:00 a.m.	No. 9 Kentucky vs. No. 8 Florida	2−6	SEC Network	2,413
Quarterfinals – Thursday, May 11/Friday, May 12
6	1:30 p.m.	No. 11 Ole Miss vs. No. 3 Auburn	7−8	SEC Network	2,500
7	4:00 p.m.	No. 10 South Carolina vs. No. 2 Georgia	2−1^{8}	SEC Network	2,500
8	8:00 p.m.	No. 5 Alabama vs. No. 4 Arkansas	3−2^{9}	SEC Network	2,744
9	10:00 a.m.	No. 8 Florida vs. No. 1 Tennessee	0−4	SEC Network	2,744
Semifinals – Friday, May 12
10	12:30 p.m.	No. 10 South Carolina vs. No. 3 Auburn	3−2	ESPN2	2,443
11	3:00 p.m.	No. 5 Alabama vs. No. 1 Tennessee	6−7	ESPN2	2,443
Championship – Saturday, May 13
12	3:00 p.m.	No. 10 South Carolina vs. No. 1 Tennessee	1−3	ESPN	2,428
*Game times in EDT. # – Rankings denote tournament seed.
