= Tim Walton (softball) =

American coach and athlete

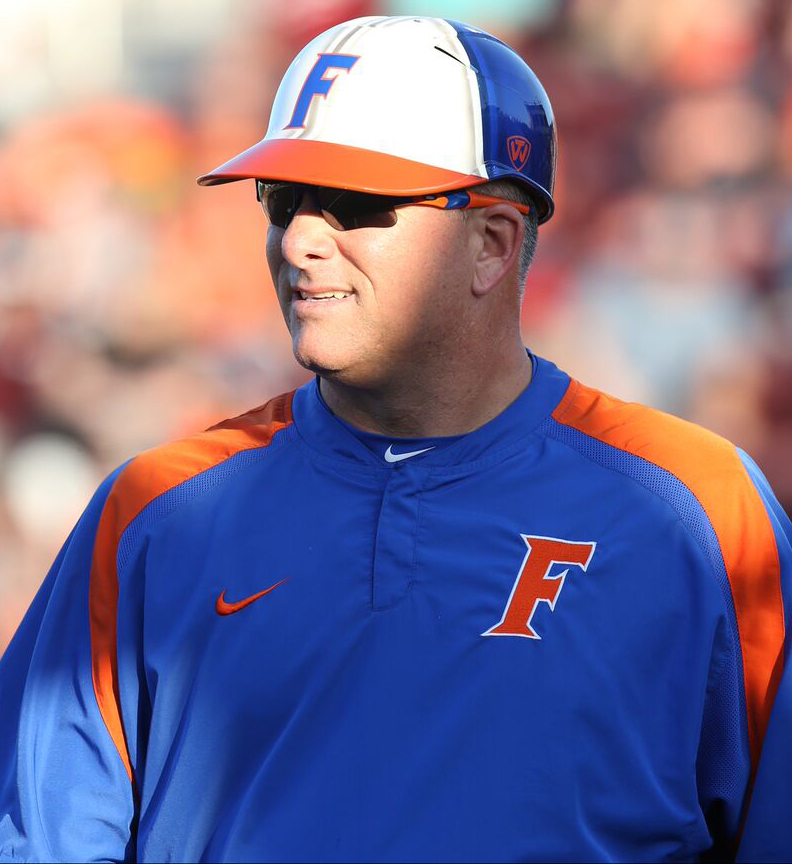

Current position
- Title: Head coach
- Team: Florida
- Conference: SEC
- Record: 1,028–255 (.801)

Biographical details
- Born: August 6, 1972 (age 54); Cerritos, California, U.S.

Playing career

Baseball
- 1992–1993: Cerritos
- 1994–1995: Oklahoma
- Position: Pitcher

Coaching career (HC unless noted)
- 1999–2002: Oklahoma (asst.)
- 2003–2005: Wichita State
- 2006–present: Florida
- 2010–2011: USSSA Pride

Head coaching record
- Overall: 1,151–319 (.783)

Accomplishments and honors

Championships
- As a player: College World Series (1994); As a coach: 2× Women's College World Series (2014, 2015); 6× SEC tournament (2008, 2009, 2013, 2018, 2019, 2024); 8× SEC Regular Season (2008, 2009, 2013, 2015-2018, 2021); 5× SEC Eastern Division (2008-2011, 2013)

Awards
- 5× SEC Coach of the Year (2008, 2009, 2011, 2013, 2017); NFCA Southeast Regional Coaching Staff of the Year (2019)

Timothy Ian Walton (born August 6, 1972) is an American college softball coach and a former college and professional baseball player. Walton is currently the head coach of the Florida Gators softball team of the University of Florida.

He has a 980-238 (.811) record at Florida. He is a five-time SEC Coach of the Year and helped the Gators set the SEC single-season record wins at 27 and NCAA single-season record wins at 70 in 2008. Ten years later, he helped them set the NCAA record for the most walks at 360 that season.

Walton has led the Gators to 8 SEC regular season championships, 5 SEC championships, 14 Regional appearances, 12 Super Regional appearances, and 10 Women's College World Series appearances with back-to-back Women's College World Series Championships in 2014 and 2015. With that success, he and his coaching staff won the 2015 NFCA Division I National Coaching Staff of the Year and are five time NFCA Southeast Region Coaching Staff of the Year Selections. Walton has been able to breed 43 NFCA All-American honors, 62 All-SEC honors, 2 USA Softball Player of the Year recipients, 3 Honda Award winners, 10 SEC Player and Pitcher of the Year honorees, and one NFCA Freshman of the Year. Players under Coach Walton have excelled off the field with 18 CoSIDA Academic All-American honors, 127 appearances in the SEC Honor Roll, and 55 SEC Academic Honor Roll First-Year recipients.

Walton graduated from the University of Oklahoma with a degree in history. He played professional baseball with the Philadelphia Phillies from 1995 to 1997. He is married and has two sons and a daughter.

== Playing career ==
Walton first attended Cerritos College in his hometown of Cerritos, California, where he played for the Cerritos Falcons baseball team in 1992 and 1993. After his sophomore year, he transferred to the University of Oklahoma in Norman, Oklahoma, where he was a two-year letter-winner for the Oklahoma Sooners baseball team in 1994 and 1995. As a Sooner baseball player, Walton participated in two consecutive College World Series, earning a win in the Sooners' 13–5 victory over the Georgia Tech Yellow Jackets in the 1994 College World Series championship game. He graduated from the university with his bachelor's degree in history in 1996.

After college, he played with the Philadelphia Phillies minor league organization for two seasons.

== Coaching career ==
Walton was an assistant coach for the Oklahoma Sooners softball team of his alma mater, the University of Oklahoma, for four seasons from 1999 to 2002. He accepted the head coaching position for the Wichita State Shockers softball team at Wichita State University after the 2002 season, and tallied a three-season win–loss record of 123–64 from 2003 to 2005.

Walton has been involved with USA Softball since 2015 as an assistant coach.

== Personal ==
Walton is married to the former Samantha Rhoten, who played basketball at Oral Roberts University. The Waltons have two sons and a daughter.

== Head coaching record ==
Record table
Season	Team	Overall	Conference	Standing	Postseason
Wichita State Shockers (Missouri Valley Conference) (2003–2005)
2003	Wichita State	39–20	16–9	3rd	
2004	Wichita State	38–26	15–12	5th	
2005	Wichita State	46–18	22–4	2nd	NCAA Regional
Wichita State:		123–64 (.658)	53–25 (.679)		
Florida Gators (Southeastern Conference) (2006–Present)
2006	Florida	43–25	17–13	3rd (East)	NCAA Regional
2007	Florida	50–22	17–11	2nd (East)	NCAA Super Regional
2008	Florida	70–5	27–1	1st (East)	Women's College World Series
2009	Florida	63–5	26–1	1st (East)	Women's College World Series (Runner-Up)
2010	Florida	49–10	20–4	1st (East)	Women's College World Series
2011	Florida	56–13	21–7	1st (East)	Women's College World Series (Runner-Up)
2012	Florida	48–13	21–7	2nd (East)	NCAA Regional
2013	Florida	58–9	18–6	1st (East)	Women's College World Series
2014	Florida	55–12	15–9	4th	Women's College World Series Champions
2015	Florida	60–7	18–5	1st	Women's College World Series Champions
2016	Florida	56–7	20–4	1st	NCAA Super Regional
2017	Florida	58–10	20–3	1st	Women's College World Series (Runner-Up)
2018	Florida	56–11	20–4	1st	Women's College World Series
2019	Florida	49–18	12–12	T–6th	Women's College World Series
2020	Florida	23–4 (Note: The season was not played past March 11 due to the COVID-19 pandemic in the United States.)	3–0		Postseason not held
2021	Florida	45–11	19–5	T–1st	NCAA Super Regional
2022	Florida	49–19	13–11	T–4th	Women's College World Series
2023	Florida	38–22	11–13	8th	NCAA Regional
2024	Florida	54–15	17–7	2nd	Women's College World Series
2025	Florida	48–17	14–10	T–5th	Women's College World Series
2026	Florida	52–12	17–7	3rd	NCAA Super Regional
Florida:		1,076–264 (.803)	366–140 (.723)		
Total:		1,199–328 (.785)			
National champion Postseason invitational champion Conference regular season champion Conference regular season and conference tournament champion Division regular season champion Division regular season and conference tournament champion Conference tournament champion

== See also ==
- History of the University of Florida
- List of University of Oklahoma alumni
- University of Florida Athletic Association
