= 2009 SEC softball tournament =

2009 Southeastern Conference softball tournament
- Finals site: Sherri Parker Lee Softball Stadium; Knoxville, Tennessee
- Champions: Florida (2nd title)
- Runner-up: Alabama (5th title game)
- Winning coach: Tim Walton (2nd title)
- MVP: Kristina Hilberth (Florida)

The 2009 SEC softball tournament was held at Sherri Parker Lee Softball Stadium on the campus of the University of Tennessee in Knoxville, Tennessee, on May 7 through May 9, 2009. The Florida Gators won the 2008 tournament and are the 2009 regular season conference champion. The Florida Gators received the conference's automatic bid to the 2009 NCAA Division I softball tournament by winning the conference tournament.

== Tournament ==
Quarterfinals; May 7th
3	Georgia	0
6	Kentucky	2
2	Alabama	8
7	Arkansas	0
1	Florida	3
8	Auburn	0
4	LSU	5
5	Tennessee	6

Semifinals; May 8th
2	Alabama	2
6	Kentucky	1
1	Florida	11
5	Tennessee	3

Finals; May 9th
1	Florida	8
2	Alabama	5

== See also ==
- Women's College World Series
- NCAA Division I Softball Championship
- SEC softball tournament
- SEC tournament
