= 2007 SEC softball tournament =

2007 Southeastern Conference softball tournament
- Finals site: Jane B. Moore Field; Auburn, Alabama
- Champions: LSU (5th title)
- Runner-up: Florida (2nd title game)
- Winning coach: Yvette Girouard (4th title)
- MVP: Dani Hofer (LSU)

The 2007 SEC softball tournament was held at Jane B. Moore Field on the campus of Auburn University in Auburn, Alabama, from May 10 through May 12, 2007. LSU won the tournament and earned the Southeastern Conference's automatic bid to the 2007 NCAA tournament.

== Tournament ==
First Round; May 10th, 2007
1	Tennessee	6
8	Ole Miss	0
4	Florida	3
5	Mississippi State	0
2	LSU	2*
7	South Carolina	1*
3	Alabama	3*
6	Georgia	2*

Semi-Finals; May 11th, 2007
4	Florida	1
1	Tennessee	0
3	Alabama	1
2	LSU	4

Finals; May 12th, 2007
4	Florida	0*
2	LSU	1*

- Kentucky, Auburn and Arkansas did not make the tournament. Vanderbilt does not sponsor a softball team.
- * Extra innings

== All-Tournament Team ==
- P - Stacey Nelson, Florida
- P - Dani Hofer, LSU
- C - McKenna Hughes, South Carolina
- IF - Melissa Zick, Florida
- IF - Shannon Stein, LSU
- IF - Kellie Eubanks, Alabama
- IF - Kim Waleszonia, Florida
- OF - Lindsay Schutzler, Tennessee
- OF - Rachel Mitchell, LSU
- OF - Leslie Klein, LSU
- DP - Tiffany Huff, Tennessee
- SEC Tournament MVP: Dani Hofer, LSU

== See also ==
- Women's College World Series
- NCAA Division I Softball Championship
- 2007 NCAA Division I softball tournament
- SEC softball tournament
- SEC Tournament
