= 2004 SEC softball tournament =

2004 Southeastern Conference softball tournament
- Finals site: University of Alabama Softball Stadium; Tuscaloosa, Alabama
- Champions: LSU (4th title)
- Runner-up: Georgia (2nd title game)
- Winning coach: Yvette Girouard (3rd title)
- MVP: Kristin Schmidt (LSU)

The 2004 SEC softball tournament was held at the University of Alabama Softball Stadium on the campus of the University of Alabama in Tuscaloosa, Alabama, from May 13 through May 16, 2004. LSU won the tournament and earned the Southeastern Conference's automatic bid to the NCAA tournament.

== Tournament ==
First round
7	Mississippi State	8
2	Tennessee	2
6	Florida	1
3	Georgia	7
6	Florida	5
2	Tennessee	7
8	South Carolina	0
1	LSU	2
5	Alabama	7
4	Auburn	1
8	South Carolina	0
4	Auburn	2

Second round
7	Mississippi State	2
3	Georgia	11
2	Tennessee	1
5	Alabama	0
5	Alabama	1
1	LSU	2
7	Mississippi State	3
4	Auburn	4

Semifinals
3	Georgia	4	–
2	Tennessee	0	–
4	Auburn	2	0
1	LSU	0	1

Finals
3	Georgia	1
1	LSU	4

- Ole Miss, Kentucky and Arkansas did not make the tournament. Vanderbilt does not sponsor a softball team.

== All-Tournament Team ==
- P - Kristin Schmidt, LSU
- P - Kasi Carroll, Georgia
- C - Shannon McKeon, Georgia
- 1B - Jackie McClain, Alabama
- 2B - Megan McAllister, Georgia
- 3B - Jade Jarvis, Georgia
- SS - Lindsey Schutzler, Tennessee
- OF - Iyhia McMichael, Mississippi State
- OF - Sara Fekete, Tennessee
- OF - Leslie Klein, LSU
- DP - Paige Jones, Auburn
- SEC Tournament MVP: Kristin Schmidt, LSU, Pitcher

== See also ==
- Women's College World Series
- NCAA Division I Softball Championship
- SEC Tournament
