= 2006 SEC softball tournament =

2006 Southeastern Conference softball tournament
- Finals site: Georgia Softball Stadium; Athens, Georgia
- Champions: Tennessee (1st title)
- Runner-up: LSU (7th title game)
- Winning coach: Ralph Weekly & Karen Weekly (1st title)
- MVP: Monica Abbott (Tennessee)

The 2006 SEC softball tournament was held at the Georgia Softball Stadium on the campus of the University of Georgia in Athens, Georgia from May 11 through May 13, 2006. Tennessee won the tournament and earned the Southeastern Conference's automatic bid to the NCAA tournament.

== Tournament ==
First Round
5	Florida	0
4	Tennessee	6
8	Ole Miss	0
1	Alabama	6
7	Arkansas	0
2	Georgia	2
6	Auburn	1
3	LSU	4

Semi-Finals
4	Tennessee	2
1	Alabama	1
3	LSU	5
2	Georgia	0

Finals
4	Tennessee	3
3	LSU	0

== All-Tournament Team ==
- P-Monica Abbott, Tennessee
- P-Emily Turner, LSU
- C-Killian Roessner, LSU
- 1B-Tonya Callahan, Tennessee
- 2B-Vanessa Soto, LSU
- 3B-Lauren Delahoussaye, LSU
- SS-Lindsay Schutzler, Tennessee
- OF-Sarah Fekete, Tennessee
- OF-Brittany Rogers, Alabama
- OF-Katherine Card, Tennessee
- DP-India Chiles, Tennessee
- MVP - Monica Abbott, Tennessee
