= SEC softball tournament =

- Conference softball championship
- SEC Softball Championship Tournament logo
- Sport: Softball
- Conference: Southeastern Conference
- Number of teams: 15
- Format: Single-elimination tournament (2006-present); Double-elimination tournament (1997-2006)
- Current stadium: Toyota Field (Alabama)
- Current location: Madison, Alabama
- Played: 1997-present
- Last contest: 2026 Southeastern Conference softball tournament
- Current champion: Texas
- Most championships: Alabama & Florida (6)
- TV partner(s): SEC Network and ESPN
- Official website: SECSports.com Softball

The SEC softball tournament (sometimes known simply as the SEC tournament) is the conference championship tournament in college softball for the Southeastern Conference (SEC). It is a single-elimination (since 2006) tournament and seeding is based on regular season records. The winner receives the conference's automatic bid to the NCAA Division I softball tournament.

== Tournament ==
The SEC softball tournament is a single-elimination tournament held each year at various SEC-conference campus stadiums. All 15 teams in the SEC make the tournament each year (Vanderbilt does not sponsor a softball team).

== History ==
The tournament has been held since 1997, when the SEC began sponsoring softball. In 1997 it was an eight-team, double-elimination tournament with byes for the top two seeds. From 1998 until 2005 it was an eight-team, double-elimination tournament with no byes. In 2006 it became an eight-team, single-elimination tournament. In 2013, with the addition of Missouri and Texas A&M into the SEC, the tournament moved to a ten-team, single-elimination tournament with the top six teams earning first round byes. In 2025, with the addition of Oklahoma and Texas into the SEC, the tournament moved to a fifteen-team, single-elimination tournament with the top four teams earning double-byes.

== Champions ==
=== Year-by-year ===
Year	Champion	Venue	MVP
1997	South Carolina	Columbus, Georgia	Trinity Johnson, P, South Carolina
1998	Alabama	Columbus, Georgia	Autumn Anderson, P, Mississippi State
1999	LSU	Columbus, Georgia	Ashley Lewis, P, LSU
2000	South Carolina	Columbus, Georgia	Megan Matthews, P, South Carolina
2001	LSU	Jim Frost Stadium, Chattanooga, Tennessee	Britni Sneed, P, LSU
2002	LSU	Jim Frost Stadium, Chattanooga, Tennessee	Britni Sneed, P, LSU
2003	Alabama	Plant City Stadium, Plant City, Florida	Kristin Schmidt, P, LSU
2004	LSU	University of Alabama Softball Stadium, Tuscaloosa, Alabama	Kristin Schmidt, P, LSU
2005	Alabama	Katie Seashole Pressly Softball Stadium, Gainesville, Florida	Stephanie VanBrakle, DP/UT, Alabama
2006	Tennessee	Jack Turner Stadium, Athens, Georgia	Monica Abbott, P, Tennessee
2007	LSU	Jane B. Moore Field, Auburn, Alabama	Dani Hofer, P, LSU
2008	Florida	Tiger Park, Baton Rouge, Louisiana	Stacey Nelson, P, Florida
2009	Florida	Sherri Parker Lee Softball Stadium, Knoxville, Tennessee	Kristina Hilberth, C, Florida
2010	Alabama	Bogle Park, Fayetteville, Arkansas	Kelsi Dunne, P, Alabama
2011	Tennessee	Ole Miss Softball Complex, University, Mississippi	Ellen Renfroe, P, Tennessee
2012	Alabama	Rhoads Stadium, Tuscaloosa, Alabama	Jaclyn Traina, P, Alabama
2013	Florida	John Cropp Stadium, Lexington, Kentucky	Kristi Merritt, OF, Florida
2014	Georgia	South Carolina Softball Stadium, Columbia, South Carolina	Chelsea Wilkinson, P, Georgia
2015	Auburn	Tiger Park, Baton Rouge, Louisiana	Emily Carosone, 2B, Auburn
2016	Auburn	Nusz Park, Starkville, Mississippi	Emily Carosone, 2B, Auburn
2017	Ole Miss	Sherri Parker Lee Stadium, Knoxville, Tennessee	Kaitlin Lee, P, Ole Miss
2018	Florida	Mizzou Softball Stadium, Columbia, Missouri	Amanda Lorenz, OF, Florida
2019	Florida	Davis Diamond, College Station, Texas	Kelly Barnhill, P, Florida
2020	Cancelled due to the COVID-19 pandemic		
2021	Alabama	Rhoads Stadium, Tuscaloosa, Alabama	Montana Fouts, P, Alabama
2022	Arkansas	Katie Seashole Pressly Softball Stadium, Gainesville, Florida	Chenise Delce, P, Arkansas
2023	Tennessee	Bogle Park, Fayetteville, Arkansas	Kiki Milloy, OF, Tennessee
2024	Florida	Jane B. Moore Field, Auburn, Alabama	Skylar Wallace, SS, Florida
2025	Oklahoma & Texas A&M	Jack Turner Stadium, Athens, Georgia	—N/a
2026	Texas	John Cropp Stadium, Lexington, Kentucky	Teagan Kavan, P, Texas
2027		Toyota Field, Madison, Alabama	
2028		Toyota Field, Madison, Alabama	
2029		Toyota Field, Madison, Alabama	
2030		Toyota Field, Madison, Alabama	

=== By school ===
Updated after the 2026 tournament

School	Appearances	W–L	PCT	Tourney Titles	Title Years
Alabama	29	49–31	.613	6	1998, 2003, 2005, 2010, 2012, 2021
Florida	29	41–31	.569	6	2008, 2009, 2013, 2018, 2019, 2024
LSU	29	48–29	.623	5	1999, 2001, 2002, 2004, 2007
Tennessee	26	33–29	.532	3	2006, 2011, 2023
South Carolina	23	26–28	.481	2	1997, 2000
Auburn	25	24–30	.444	2	2015, 2016
Texas	2	4–1	.800	1	2026
Oklahoma	2	2–1	.667	1	2025^{1}
Ole Miss	14	13–13	.500	1	2017
Georgia	25	25–28	.472	1	2014
Arkansas	18	17–22	.436	1	2022
Texas A&M	12	4–11	.267	1	2025^{1}
Missouri	12	11–12	.478	0	
Mississippi State	24	16–32	.333	0	
Kentucky	19	7–21	.250	0	

^1Oklahoma and Texas A&M were declared co-champions in 2025 when the tournament was abandoned because of weather issues.
