= 2021 SEC softball tournament =

Postseason collegiate softball tournament

2021 Southeastern Conference softball tournament
- Teams: 13
- Format: Single-elimination tournament
- Finals site: Rhoads Stadium; Tuscaloosa, Alabama
- Champions: Alabama (6th title)
- Runner-up: Florida
- Winning coach: Patrick Murphy (6th title)
- MVP: Montana Fouts (Alabama)
- Television: SEC Network; ESPN2

2021 Southeastern Conference softball standings
	Conf.				Overall
Team	W		L	PCT	W		L	PCT
No. 9 Florida ‍†‍‍^{y}	19	–	5	.792	45	–	11	.804
No. 11 Arkansas ‍†‍‍^{y}	19	–	5	.792	43	–	11	.796
No. 3 Alabama ‍‍‡‍^{y}	18	–	6	.750	52	–	9	.852
No. 13 Missouri ‍‍‍^{y}	15	–	9	.625	42	–	17	.712
No. 16 Kentucky ‍‍‍^{y}	13	–	11	.542	43	–	16	.729
No. 15 LSU ‍‍‍^{y}	13	–	11	.542	35	–	22	.614
No. 22 Tennessee ‍‍‍^{y}	12	–	11	.522	42	–	15	.737
Ole Miss ‍‍‍^{y}	12	–	12	.500	36	–	22	.621
Mississippi State ‍‍‍^{y}	8	–	15	.348	35	–	25	.583
Texas A&M ‍‍‍^{y}	8	–	16	.333	32	–	23	.582
No. 8 Georgia ‍‍‍^{y}	7	–	17	.292	34	–	23	.596
Auburn ‍‍‍^{y}	7	–	17	.292	27	–	24	.529
South Carolina ‍‍‍	4	–	20	.167	26	–	26	.500
† – Conference champion ‡ – Tournament champion y – Invited to the NCAA tournament As of June 7, 2021; Rankings from NFCA/USA Today

The 2021 Southeastern Conference Softball Tournament, played for the 2021 Southeastern Conference softball season, was a postseason softball tournament that determined the 2021 champion of the Southeastern Conference. It was held at Rhoads Stadium on the campus of the University of Alabama in Tuscaloosa, Alabama from May 11–15, 2021. As the tournament winner, the University of Alabama. earned the Southeastern Conference's automatic bid to the 2021 NCAA Division I softball tournament. The championship game, as well as the semifinals, were broadcast on ESPN2, while all other tournament games were televised on the SEC Network.

== Record vs. conference opponents ==
Date m/dd is for last scheduled game of series. Blank are not scheduled. Blue are home games, otherwise away.

2021 SEC softball records Source: 2021 SEC softball game results, 2021 SEC softball schedule
Team	W–L	ALA	ARK	AUB	FLA	UGA	KEN	LSU	MSU	MIZZ	MISS	SCAR	TENN	TAMU	Team	SR	SW
ALA	18–6		2–1	3–0	1–2	3–0	1–2	.	.	.	3–0	.	2–1	3–0	ALA	6–2	4–0
ARK	19–5	1–2		3–0	.	3–0	.	2–1	3–0	1–2	3–0	3–0	.	.	ARK	6–2	5–0
AUB	7–17	0–3	0–3		.	.	2–1	1–2	.	1–2	1–2	.	0–3	2–1	AUB	2–6	0–3
FLA	19–5	2–1	.	.		2–1	2–1	3–0	3–0	2–1	.	2–1	.	3–0	FLA	8–0	3–0
UGA	7–17	0–3	0–3	.	1–2		2–1	.	0–3	2–1	1–2	.	1–2	.	UGA	2–6	0–3
KEN	13–11	2–1	.	1–2	1–2	1–2		1–2	.	.	.	3–0	1–2	3–0	KEN	3–5	2–0
LSU	13–11	.	1–2	2–1	0–3	.	2–1		.	2–1	2–1	.	2–1	2–1	LSU	6–2	0–1
MSU	8–15	.	0–3	.	0–3	3–0	.	.		0–3	0–3	2–1	2–0	1–2	MSU	3–5	1–4
MIZZ	15–9	.	2–1	2–1	1–2	1–2	.	1–2	3–0		.	3–0	2–1	.	MIZZ	5–3	2–0
MISS	12–12	0–3	0–3	2–1	.	2–1	.	1–2	3–0	.		2–1	.	2–1	MISS	5–3	1–2
SCAR	4–20	.	0–3	.	1–2	.	0–3	.	1–2	0–3	1–2		1–2	0–3	SCAR	0–8	0–4
TENN	12–11	1–2	.	3–0	.	2–1	2–1	1–2	0–2	1–2	.	2–1		.	TENN	4–4	1–0
TAMU	8–16	0–3	.	1–2	0–3	.	0–3	1–2	2–1	.	1–2	3–0	.		TAMU	2–6	1–3
Team	W–L	ALA	ARK	AUB	FLA	UGA	KEN	LSU	MSU	MIZZ	MISS	SCAR	TENN	TAMU	Team	SR	SW

Updated for entire regular season.Tiebrkrs: FLA>ARK ALA common. LSU>KEN hd–hd. UGA>AUB MIZZ common.

== Bracket ==
First Round; Tuesday, May 11
13	South Carolina	3
12	Auburn	2

Second Round; Wednesday, May 12
9	Mississippi State	3
8	Ole Miss	1
13	South Carolina	3
5	LSU	7
10	Texas A&M	2
7	Tennessee	3^{9}
11	Georgia	0
6	Kentucky	3

Quarterfinals; Thursday, May 13
9	Mississippi State	2
1	Florida	6
5	LSU	1
4	Missouri	4
7	Tennessee	1
2	Arkansas	0
6	Kentucky	1
3	Alabama	5

Semifinals; Friday, May 14
1	Florida	7
4	Missouri	6
7	Tennessee	5
3	Alabama	6

Championship; Saturday, May 15
1	Florida	0
3	Alabama	4
