= 2008 SEC softball tournament =

2008 Southeastern Conference softball tournament
- Finals site: Tiger Park; Baton Rouge, Louisiana
- Champions: Florida (1st title)
- Runner-up: Alabama (4th title game)
- Winning coach: Tim Walton (1st title)
- MVP: Stacey Nelson (Florida)

The 2008 SEC softball tournament was held at Tiger Park on the campus of Louisiana State University in Baton Rouge, Louisiana from May 8 through May 10, 2008. Florida won the tournament and earned the Southeastern Conference's automatic bid to the 2008 NCAA Division I softball tournament.

== Tournament ==
First Round; May 8th
4	Tennessee	5
5	Georgia	2
1	Florida	1
8	Ole Miss	0
2	Alabama	1
7	Mississippi State	0
3	LSU	4
6	Auburn	0

Semi-Finals; May 9th
4	Tennessee	1
1	Florida	6
2	Alabama	7
3	LSU	4

Finals; May 10th
1	Florida	4
2	Alabama	1

- Arkansas, South Carolina and Kentucky did not make the tournament. Vanderbilt does not sponsor a softball team.

== All-Tournament Team ==
- OF, Erinn Webb, Tennessee
- IF, Tonya Callahan, Tennessee
- IF, Shannon Stein, LSU
- OF, Quinlan Duhon, LSU
- P/DP, Charlotte Morgan (softball player), Alabama
- IF, Whitney Larsen, Alabama
- P, Kelsi Dunne, Alabama
- IF, Ali Gardiner, Florida
- OF, Francesca Enea, Florida
- OF, Mary Ratliff, Florida
- P, Stacey Nelson, Florida
- MVP: P, Stacey Nelson, Florida

== See also ==
- Women's College World Series
- NCAA Division I Softball Championship
- SEC softball tournament
- SEC Tournament
