= Georgia Bulldogs softball =

- 2026 Georgia Bulldogs softball team
- Founded: 1997 (28 years ago)
- University: University of Georgia
- Head coach: Tony Baldwin (5th season)
- Conference: SEC
- Location: Athens, Georgia, US
- Home stadium: Jack Turner Stadium (capacity: 2000+)
- Nickname: Bulldogs
- Colors: Red and black

NCAA WCWS appearances
- 2009, 2010, 2016, 2018, 2021

NCAA super regional appearances
- 2005, 2008, 2009, 2010, 2011, 2012, 2014, 2015, 2016, 2018, 2021, 2023, 2024, 2025, 2026

NCAA Tournament appearances
- 2002, 2003, 2004, 2005, 2006, 2007, 2008, 2009, 2010, 2011, 2012, 2013, 2014, 2015, 2016, 2017, 2018, 2019, 2021, 2022, 2023, 2024, 2025, 2026

Conference tournament championships
- 2014

Regular-season conference championships
- 2003, 2005

The Georgia Bulldogs softball is the team that represents University of Georgia in NCAA Division I college softball. The team currently participates in the Southeastern Conference. The Bulldogs are currently led by their head coach Tony Baldwin. The team plays its home games at Jack Turner Stadium located on the university's campus.

== History ==
=== Coaching history ===
Years	Coach	Record	%
1997–2000	Alleen Hawkins	115–341	.252
2001–2021	Lu Harris-Champer	959–368	.723
2022–present	Tony Baldwin	163–75	.685

== Championships ==
=== Conference Championships ===
Season	Conference	Record	Head Coach
2003	Southeastern Conference	23–6	Lu Harris-Champer
2005	Southeastern Conference	26–4	Lu Harris-Champer

=== Divisional Championships ===
Season	Conference	Record	Head Coach
2003	Southeastern Conference	23–6	Lu Harris-Champer
2005	Southeastern Conference	26–4	Lu Harris-Champer
2006	Southeastern Conference	24–4	Lu Harris-Champer

=== Conference Tournament Championships ===
Year	Conference	Tournament Location	Head Coach
2014	Southeastern Conference	Columbia, SC	Lu Harris-Champer

== Coaching staff ==
Name	Position coached	Consecutive season at Georgia in current position
Tony Baldwin	Head coach	4th
J.T. D'Amico	Assistant coach	4th
Chelsea Wilkinson	Assistant coach	4th
Mike Davenport	Assistant coach	1st
Karly Heath	Player Development Coordinator	1st
Robin Confer	Director of Softball Operations	6th
Conner Tidmus	Athletic Trainer	

== Notable players ==
=== National awards ===
NFCA Golden Shoe Award

- Cortni Emanuel, 2018

=== Conference awards ===
SEC Player of the Year

- Kim Wendland, 2005

SEC Pitcher of the Year

- Michelle Green, 2003, 2005

SEC Freshman of the Year

- Geri Ann Glasco, 2013
