= Big 12 Conference softball tournament =

Big 12 softball tournament
- Conference softball championship
- Sport: Softball
- Conference: Big 12 Conference
- Number of teams: 10
- Format: Single-elimination tournament
- Current stadium: Devon Park
- Current location: Oklahoma City, Oklahoma
- Played: 1996–2010; 2017–present
- Last contest: 2026
- Current champion: Arizona State Sun Devils
- Most championships: Oklahoma Sooners (9)
- Official website: Big12Sports.com Softball

The Big 12 softball tournament (sometimes known simply as the Big 12 championship) is the conference championship tournament in college softball for the Big 12 Conference (Big 12). Since its inception in 1996, the tournament has been played at OGE Energy Field at Devon Park (formerly USA Softball Hall of Fame Complex) in Oklahoma City, Oklahoma. The winner receives the conference's automatic bid to the NCAA Division I softball tournament. The Big 12 stopped holding a postseason conference tournament after the 2010 competition. In 2017, the Big 12 Conference revived the tournament, which is still hosted at OGE Energy Field at Devon Park in Oklahoma City.

== Champions ==
=== Year-by-year ===
Year	School	MOP
1996	Oklahoma	Jill Most (Oklahoma)
1997	Missouri	Barb Wright (Missouri)
1998	Nebraska	Jenny Voss (Nebraska)
1999	Texas	Jennifer Lizama (Nebraska)
2000	Nebraska	Jennifer Lizama (Nebraska)
2001	Oklahoma	Lisa Carey (Oklahoma)
2002	Texas	Cat Osterman (Texas)
2003	Texas	Cat Osterman (Texas)
2004	Nebraska	Peaches James (Nebraska)
2005	Texas	Cat Osterman (Texas)
2006	Kansas	Serena Settlemier (Kansas)
2007	Oklahoma	Lauren Eckermann (Oklahoma)
2008	Texas A&M	Megan Gibson (Texas A&M)
2009	Missouri	Chelsea Thomas (Missouri)
2010	Oklahoma	Keilani Ricketts (Oklahoma)
2011–2016 Tournament not held
2017	Oklahoma	Paige Parker (Oklahoma)
2018	Oklahoma	Nicole Pendley (Oklahoma)
2019	Cancelled due to rain	
2020	Cancelled due to the COVID-19 pandemic	
2021	Oklahoma	Kinzie Hansen (Oklahoma)
2022	Oklahoma State	Morgan Day (Oklahoma State)
2023	Oklahoma	Haley Lee (Oklahoma)
2024	Oklahoma	Ella Parker (Oklahoma)
2025	Texas Tech	NiJaree Canady (Texas Tech)
2026	Arizona State	Kenzie Brown (Arizona State)

=== By school ===
==== Current Members ====
School	Appearances	W	L	Pct	Titles	Title Years
Arizona	2	2	2	.500	0	
Arizona State	2	4	1	.800	1	2026
Baylor	22	18	29	.383	0	
BYU	2	1	1	.500	0	
Houston	2	0	1	.000	0	
Iowa State	23	10	29	.256	0	
Kansas	21	18	26	.409	1	2006
Oklahoma State	24	28	33	.459	1	2022
Texas Tech	25	21	32	.396	1	2025
UCF	3	0	1	.000	0	
Utah	2	0	1	.000	0	

==== Former Members ====
School	Appearances	W	L	Pct	Titles	Title Years
Missouri	18	26	21	.553	2	1997, 2009
Nebraska	18	33	19	.635	3	1998, 2000, 2004
Oklahoma	22	55	19	.743	9	1996, 2001, 2007, 2010, 2017, 2018, 2021, 2023, 2024
Texas	21	33	26	.559	4	1999, 2002, 2003, 2005
Texas A&M	18	19	22	.463	1	2008
