= List of Texas A&M Aggies softball seasons =

The following is a list of Texas A&M Aggies softball seasons. Texas A&M University is a member of the Southeastern Conference of the NCAA Division I. The Aggies are three time Women's College World Series champions, with the first of those titles coming during the AIAW years, and the others under NCAA organization. Texas A&M has also appeared in the final event 12 times - 4 under the AIAW and 8 under the NCAA. The team played its first season in 1973.

National champions	Women's College World Series berth	NCAA Tournament berth	Conference Tournament Champions	Conference Regular Season Champions

Season	Head coach	Conference	Season results									Postseason result	
Season	Head coach	Conference	Overall				Conference					Postseason result	
Season	Head coach	Conference	Wins	Losses	Ties	%	Wins	Losses	Ties	%	Finish	Conference	Postseason
1972–73	Mildred Little	Independent	Not Available				N/A						—
1973–74	Toby Crown / Kay Don	Independent	Not Available				N/A						—
1974–75	Kay Don	Independent	Not Available				N/A						—
1975–76	Kay Don	Independent	15	14	0	.517	N/A						—
1976–77	Diane Quitta	Independent	31	9	0	.775	N/A						—
1977–78	Diane Justice & Don Smith	Independent	33	20	0	.623	N/A						—
1978–79	Bill Galloway	Independent	58	20	0	.744	N/A						WCWS
1979–80	Bill Galloway	Independent	72	16	0	.818	N/A						WCWS
1980–81	Bill Galloway	Independent	78	12	0	.867	N/A						WCWS
1981–82	Bob Brock	Independent	84	9	0	.903	N/A						AIAW National Champions
1983	Bob Brock	Independent	41	11	0	.788	N/A						National Champions
1984	Bob Brock	Independent	51	18	0	.739	N/A						WCWS
1985	Bob Brock	Independent	45	12	0	.789	N/A						Regional
1986	Bob Brock	Independent	41	13	0	.759	N/A						WCWS
1987	Bob Brock	Independent	56	8	0	.875	N/A						National Champions
1988	Bob Brock	Independent	43	21	0	.672	N/A						WCWS
1989	Bob Brock	Independent	31	27	0	.534	N/A						—
1990	Bob Brock	Independent	47	20	0	.701	N/A						Regional
1991	Bob Brock	Independent	46	15	0	.754	N/A						Regional
1992	Bob Brock	Independent	41	19	0	.683	N/A						—
1993	Bob Brock	Independent	38	14	0	.731	N/A						—
1994	Bob Brock	Independent	56	20	0	.737	N/A						Regional
1995	Bob Brock	Independent	29	27	0	.518	N/A						—
1996	Bob Brock	Big 12 Conference	39	21	0	.650	11	11	0	.500	5th (8)	T-5th	Regional
1997	Jo Evans	Big 12 Conference	37	29	0	.561	7	9	0	.438	6th	T-7th	—
1998	Jo Evans	Big 12 Conference	32	25	2	.559	6	10	1	.382	7th	T-9th	—
1999	Jo Evans	Big 12 Conference	41	22	0	.651	7	11	0	.389	7th	T-7th	Regional
2000	Jo Evans	Big 12 Conference	32	23	0	.582	8	10	0	.444	T-4th	2nd	Regional
2001	Jo Evans	Big 12 Conference	32	19	0	.627	7	11	0	.389	7th	T-5th	—
2002	Jo Evans	Big 12 Conference	40	18	0	.690	9	9	0	.500	5th	4th	Regional
2003	Jo Evans	Big 12 Conference	38	22	0	.633	10	8	0	.556	5th	T-5th	Regional
2004	Jo Evans	Big 12 Conference	33	22	0	.600	13	3	0	.813	2nd	T-5th	Regional
2005	Jo Evans	Big 12 Conference	47	10	0	.825	14	4	0	.778	1st	T-5th	Super Regional
2006	Jo Evans	Big 12 Conference	34	19	0	.642	11	6	0	.647	4th	T-5th	Regional
2007	Jo Evans	Big 12 Conference	46	14	0	.767	12	6	0	.667	4th	4th	WCWS
2008	Jo Evans	Big 12 Conference	57	10	0	.851	17	1	0	.944	1st	1st	WCWS Runner-up
2009	Jo Evans	Big 12 Conference	33	22	0	.600	8	9	0	.471	6th	T-7th	Regional
2010	Jo Evans	Big 12 Conference	44	16	0	.733	12	6	0	.667	3rd	4th	Regional
2011	Jo Evans	Big 12 Conference	44	15	0	.746	13	5	0	.722	3rd	—	Super Regional
2012	Jo Evans	Big 12 Conference	41	18	0	.695	16	8	0	.667	T-3rd	—	Regional
2013	Jo Evans	SEC	42	18	0	.700	10	13	0	.435	T-4th (West)	9th	Super Regional
2014	Jo Evans	SEC	37	22	0	.627	9	15	0	.375	11th	—	Regional
2015	Jo Evans	SEC	40	20	0	.667	12	12	0	.500	8th	T-9th	Regional
2016	Jo Evans	SEC	39	20	0	.661	6	15	0	.286	10th	T-9th	Regional
2017	Jo Evans	SEC	47	13	0	.783	16	7	0	.696	T-3rd	T-5th	Super Regional
2018	Jo Evans	SEC	44	18	0	.710	13	11	0	.542	6th	T-9th	Super Regional
2019	Jo Evans	SEC	28	27	0	.509	6	18	0	.250	13th	13th	Regional
2020	Jo Evans	SEC	17	9	0	.654	1	2	0	.333	Season canceled		
2021	Jo Evans	SEC	32	23	0	.582	8	16	0	.333	10th	T-9th	Regional
2022	Jo Evans	SEC	31	28	0	.525	6	18	0	.250	12th	T-9th	Regional
2023	Trisha Ford	SEC	35	21	0	.625	12	12	0	.500	7th	T-9th	Regional
2024	Trisha Ford	SEC	44	15	0	.746	15	9	0	.625	3rd	T-3rd	Super Regional
2025	Trisha Ford	SEC	48	11	0	.814	16	7	0	.696	2nd	T-1st	Regional
2026	Trisha Ford	SEC	38	19	0	.667	16	8	0	.667	T-4th	T-9th	Regional
