= List of Oklahoma Sooners softball seasons =

The following is a list of Oklahoma Sooners softball seasons. The Oklahoma Sooners softball program is a college softball team that represents the University of Oklahoma in the Southeastern Conference (SEC) of the National Collegiate Athletic Association. The Sooners have won eight Women's College World Series championships, fifteen Big 12 Conference regular-season championships and eight Big 12 Conference Tournament championships.

National champions	Women's College World Series berth	NCAA Tournament berth	Conference Tournament Champions	Conference Regular Season Champions

Season	Head coach	Conference	Season results									Postseason result		Sources
Season	Head coach	Conference	Overall				Conference					Postseason result		Sources
Season	Head coach	Conference	Wins	Losses	Ties	%	Wins	Losses	Ties	%	Finish	Conference	Postseason	Sources
1975	Amy Dahl	Independent	14	6	0	.700	—	—	—	—	—	—	WCWS	
1976	Amy Dahl	Big 8 Conference	4	10	0	.286	—	—	—	—	—	—	—	
1977	Marita Hynes	Big 8 Conference	11	18	0	.379	—	—	—	—	—	—	—	
1978	Marita Hynes	Big 8 Conference	24	15	0	.615	—	—	—	—	—	—	—	
1979 (spring)	Marita Hynes	Big 8 Conference	36	14	0	.720	—	—	—	—	—	—	—	
1979 (fall)	Marita Hynes	Big 8 Conference	13	10	0	.565	—	—	—	—	—	—	—	
1980 (spring)	Marita Hynes	Big 8 Conference	37	19	0	.661	—	—	—	—	—	—	WCWS	
1980 (fall)	Marita Hynes	Big 8 Conference	9	12	0	.429	—	—	—	—	—	—	—	
1981 (spring)	Marita Hynes	Big 8 Conference	38	27	0	.585	—	—	—	—	—	—	WCWS	
1981 (fall)	Marita Hynes	Big 8 Conference	13	12	0	.520	—	—	—	—	—	—	—	
1982	Marita Hynes	Big 8 Conference	25	29	0	.463	—	—	—	—	—	3rd	AIAW WCWS	
1983	Marita Hynes	Big 8 Conference	28	18	0	.609	4	2	0	.667	—	—	—	
1984	Marita Hynes	Big 8 Conference	23	14	0	.622	6	2	0	.750	—	—	—	
1985	Michelle Thomas	Big 8 Conference	24	18	0	.571	5	7	0	.417	—	—	—	
1986	Michelle Thomas	Big 8 Conference	26	17	0	.605	8	4	0	.667	—	—	—	
1987	Michelle Thomas	Big 8 Conference	29	21	0	.580	6	4	0	.600	—	—	NWIT	
1988	Michelle Thomas	Big 8 Conference	18	26	0	.409	2	8	0	.200	—	—	—	
1989	Michelle Thomas	Big 8 Conference	16	40	0	.286	1	9	0	.100	—	—	—	
1990	Michelle Thomas	Big 8 Conference	15	31	0	.326	3	7	0	.300	—	—	—	
1991	Michelle Thomas	Big 8 Conference	36	23	0	.610	2	8	0	.200	—	—	—	
1992	Michelle Thomas	Big 8 Conference	40	26	0	.606	2	14	0	.125	—	—	—	
1993	Michelle Thomas	Big 8 Conference	22	28	0	.440	2	14	0	.125	—	—	—	
1994	Jim Beitia	Big 8 Conference	58	14	0	.806	5	7	0	.227	—	—	Regional	
1995	Patty Gasso	Big 8 Conference	43	23	0	.652	12	4	0	.750	—	—	Regional	
1996	Patty Gasso	Big 12 Conference	50	20	0	.714	17	5	0	.773	1st	1st	Regional	
1997	Patty Gasso	Big 12 Conference	55	19	0	.743	14	4	0	.778	2nd	3rd	Regional	
1998	Patty Gasso	Big 12 Conference	49	15	0	.766	12	5	0	.706	2nd	2nd	Regional	
1999	Patty Gasso	Big 12 Conference	40	16	0	.714	11	3	0	.786	1st	T-5th	Regional	
2000	Patty Gasso	Big 12 Conference	66	8	0	.892	17	1	0	.944	1st	T-3rd	National Champion	
2001	Patty Gasso	Big 12 Conference	50	9	0	.847	14	2	0	.875	2nd	1st	WCWS	
2002	Patty Gasso	Big 12 Conference	49	16	0	.754	14	2	0	.875	2nd	3rd	WCWS	
2003	Patty Gasso	Big 12 Conference	47	14	0	.770	12	6	0	.667	4th	2nd	WCWS	
2004	Patty Gasso	Big 12 Conference	45	22	1	.669	11	7	0	.611	5th	T-3rd	WCWS	
2005	Patty Gasso	Big 12 Conference	50	17	0	.746	12	6	0	.667	2nd	4th	Super Regional	
2006	Patty Gasso	Big 12 Conference	40	21	1	.653	8	10	0	.444	5th	2nd	Regional	
2007	Patty Gasso	Big 12 Conference	55	8	0	.873	14	4	0	.778	2nd	1st	Super Regional	
2008	Patty Gasso	Big 12 Conference	47	14	0	.770	16	2	0	.889	2nd	T-7th	Super Regional	
2009	Patty Gasso	Big 12 Conference	41	16	0	.719	14	4	0	.778	1st	2nd	Regional	
2010	Patty Gasso	Big 12 Conference	47	12	0	.797	13	3	0	.813	2nd	1st	Super Regional	
2011	Patty Gasso	Big 12 Conference	43	19	0	.694	10	8	0	.556	5th	—	WCWS	
2012	Patty Gasso	Big 12 Conference	54	10	0	.844	19	5	0	.792	1st	—	WCWS Runner-up	
2013	Patty Gasso	Big 12 Conference	57	4	0	.934	15	2	0	.882	1st	—	National Champion	
2014	Patty Gasso	Big 12 Conference	51	13	0	.797	16	2	0	.889	1st	—	WCWS	
2015	Patty Gasso	Big 12 Conference	49	9	0	.845	14	2	0	.875	1st	—	Super Regional	
2016	Patty Gasso	Big 12 Conference	57	8	0	.877	17	1	0	.944	1st	—	National Champion	
2017	Patty Gasso	Big 12 Conference	61	9	0	.871	17	1	0	.944	1st	1st	National Champion	
2018	Patty Gasso	Big 12 Conference	57	5	0	.919	17	1	0	.944	1st	1st	WCWS	
2019	Patty Gasso	Big 12 Conference	57	6	0	.905	18	0	0	1.000	1st	—	WCWS Runner-up	
2020	Patty Gasso	Big 12 Conference	20	4	0	.833	Season cancelled due to COVID-19 pandemic in the United States							
2021	Patty Gasso	Big 12 Conference	56	4	0	.933	16	1	0	.941	1st	1st	National Champion	
2022	Patty Gasso	Big 12 Conference	59	3	0	.952	17	1	0	.944	1st	2nd	National Champion	
2023	Patty Gasso	Big 12 Conference	61	1	0	.984	18	0	0	1.000	1st	1st	National Champion	
2024	Patty Gasso	Big 12 Conference	59	7	0	.894	22	5	0	.815	2nd	1st	National Champion	
2025	Patty Gasso	Southeastern Conference	52	9	0	.852	17	7	0	.708	1st	1st	WCWS	
2026	Patty Gasso	Southeastern Conference	52	10	0	.839	20	4	0	.833	1st	5th	Super Regional	
