= List of Nebraska Cornhuskers softball seasons =

This is a list of Nebraska Cornhuskers softball seasons. The Nebraska Cornhuskers softball program is a college softball team that represents the University of Nebraska–Lincoln in the Big Ten Conference of the National Collegiate Athletic Association.

The Cornhuskers have won ten conference regular season championships, ten conference tournaments, and have appeared in the NCAA Division I softball tournament 29 times, advancing to the Women's College World Series nine times, and the title game in 1985.

== Season results ==
National champions	Women's College World Series berth	NCAA Tournament berth	Conference Tournament Champions	Conference Regular Season Champions

Season	Head coach	Conference	Season results									Tournament results	
Season	Head coach	Conference	Overall				Conference					Conference	Postseason
Season	Head coach	Conference	Wins	Losses	Ties	%	Wins	Losses	Ties	%	Finish	Conference	Postseason
Nebraska Cornhuskers
1977	Don Isherwood	Big Eight Conference	12	15	0	.444	1	4	0	.200	T-4th	Big 8 Tournament	AIAW Regional
1978	Don Isherwood	Big Eight Conference	25	14	0	.641	4	3	0	.571	7th	—	—
1979	Don Isherwood	Big Eight Conference	33	18	0	.647	3	8	0	.273	6th	—	—
1980	Don Isherwood	Big Eight Conference	27	23	0	.540	8	9	0	.471	4th	Big 8 Tournament	—
1981	Nancy Plantz	Big Eight Conference	27	21	0	.563	5	6	0	.455	3rd	Big 8 Tournament	AIAW Regional
1982	Nancy Plantz	Big Eight Conference	33	14	0	.702	9	3	0	.750	1st	Big 8 Tournament champions	WCWS
1983	Nancy Plantz	Big Eight Conference	17	18	0	.486	3	7	0	.300	7th	—	—
1984	Wayne Daigle	Big Eight Conference	39	13	0	.750	6	2	0	.750	1st	Big 8 Tournament champions	WCWS
1985	Wayne Daigle	Big Eight Conference	33	8	0	.805	11	1	0	.917	1st	Big 8 Tournament champions	WCWS runner-up (Note: vacated)
1986	Wayne Daigle	Big Eight Conference	38	10	0	.679	9	3	0	.750	1st	Big 8 Tournament champions	— (Note: The Huskers were ineligible for the 1986 NCAA Division I softball tournament due to NCAA sanctions.)
1987	Ron Wolforth	Big Eight Conference	41	11	0	.788	8	2	0	.800	1st	Big 8 Tournament champions	WCWS
1988	Ron Wolforth	Big Eight Conference	39	20	0	.661	7	3	0	.700	1st	Big 8 Tournament champions	WCWS
1989	Ron Wolforth	Big Eight Conference	32	28	0	.533	6	4	0	.600	3rd	Big 8 Tournament	—
1990	Ron Wolforth	Big Eight Conference	31	19	0	.620	3	5	0	.375	5th	Big 8 Tournament	—
1991	Ron Wolforth	Big Eight Conference	22	18	0	.550	3	5	0	.375	5th	Big 8 Tournament	—
1992	Ron Wolforth	Big Eight Conference	23	30	0	.434	2	6	0	.250	5th	Big 8 Tournament	—
1993	Rhonda Revelle	Big Eight Conference	18	23	0	.439	5	11	0	.313	5th	—	—
1994	Rhonda Revelle	Big Eight Conference	21	33	0	.389	5	15	0	.250	6th	—	—
1995	Rhonda Revelle	Big Eight Conference	43	20	0	.683	10	6	0	.625	3rd	—	NCAA Regional
1996	Rhonda Revelle	Big 12 Conference	42	23	0	.646	10	8	0	.556	4th	Big 12 tournament	NCAA Regional
1997	Rhonda Revelle	Big 12 Conference	29	24	0	.547	10	6	0	.625	4th	Big 12 tournament	NCAA Regional
1998	Rhonda Revelle	Big 12 Conference	48	12	0	.800	16	0	0	1.000	1st	Big 12 tournament champions	WCWS
1999	Rhonda Revelle	Big 12 Conference	35	21	0	.625	10	8	0	.556	4th	Big 12 tournament	NCAA Regional
2000	Rhonda Revelle	Big 12 Conference	52	21	0	.712	15	2	0	.882	2nd	Big 12 tournament champions	NCAA Regional
2001	Rhonda Revelle	Big 12 Conference	51	15	0	.773	16	2	0	.889	1st	Big 12 tournament	NCAA Regional
2002	Rhonda Revelle	Big 12 Conference	50	14	0	.781	11	5	0	.688	2nd	Big 12 tournament	WCWS
2003	Rhonda Revelle	Big 12 Conference	39	17	0	.696	10	8	0	.556	6th	Big 12 tournament	NCAA Regional
2004	Rhonda Revelle	Big 12 Conference	45	17	0	.726	14	3	0	.824	1st	Big 12 tournament champions	NCAA Regional
2005	Rhonda Revelle	Big 12 Conference	36	23	0	.610	9	9	0	.500	7th	Big 12 tournament	NCAA Regional
2006	Rhonda Revelle	Big 12 Conference	44	12	0	.786	13	4	0	.765	2nd	Big 12 tournament	NCAA Regional
2007	Rhonda Revelle	Big 12 Conference	37	20	0	.649	10	8	0	.556	5th	Big 12 tournament	NCAA Regional
2008	Rhonda Revelle	Big 12 Conference	25	28	0	.472	4	14	0	.222	T-9th	Big 12 tournament	—
2009	Rhonda Revelle	Big 12 Conference	35	19	0	.648	9	9	0	.500	5th	Big 12 tournament	NCAA Regional
2010	Rhonda Revelle	Big 12 Conference	30	29	0	.508	7	11	0	.389	T-6th	Big 12 tournament	NCAA Regional
2011	Rhonda Revelle	Big 12 Conference	41	14	0	.745	9	9	0	.500	6th	—	NCAA Regional
2012	Rhonda Revelle	Big Ten Conference	33	22	0	.600	14	9	0	.609	3rd	—	—
2013	Rhonda Revelle	Big Ten Conference	45	16	0	.738	16	6	0	.727	2nd	Big Ten tournament	WCWS
2014	Rhonda Revelle	Big Ten Conference	44	18	0	.710	18	5	0	.783	2nd	Big Ten tournament	NCAA Super Regional
2015	Rhonda Revelle	Big Ten Conference	35	23	0	.603	17	6	0	.739	3rd	Big Ten tournament	NCAA Regional
2016	Rhonda Revelle	Big Ten Conference	35	21	0	.625	13	9	0	.591	5th	Big Ten tournament	NCAA Regional
2017	Rhonda Revelle	Big Ten Conference	24	29	0	.727	13	10	0	.565	5th	Big Ten tournament	—
2018	Rhonda Revelle	Big Ten Conference	31	23	0	.574	9	13	0	.409	9th	Big Ten tournament	—
2019	Rhonda Revelle	Big Ten Conference	31	23	0	.574	9	14	0	.391	T-8th	Big Ten tournament	—
2020	Rhonda Revelle	Big Ten Conference	9	14	0	.391	Season canceled due to COVID-19 pandemic						
2021	Rhonda Revelle	Big Ten Conference	22	22	0	.500	22	22	0	.500	8th	—	—
2022	Rhonda Revelle	Big Ten Conference	41	16	0	.719	17	5	0	.773	2nd	Big Ten tournament champions	NCAA Regional
2023	Rhonda Revelle	Big Ten Conference	36	22	0	.621	17	5	0	.773	4th	Big Ten tournament	NCAA Regional
2024	Rhonda Revelle	Big Ten Conference	30	23	0	.566	12	9	0	.571	4th	Big Ten tournament	—
2025	Rhonda Revelle	Big Ten Conference	43	15	0	.741	17	5	0	.773	4th	Big Ten tournament	NCAA Super Regional
2026	Rhonda Revelle	Big Ten Conference	52	8	0	.867	23	1	0	.958	1st	Big Ten tournament champions	WCWS
