= Texas Longhorns softball =

College softball team

- 2026 Texas Longhorns softball team
- Founded: 1997 (29 years ago)
- University: University of Texas at Austin
- All-time Record: 1,242–506–5 (.710)
- Head coach: Mike White (8th season)
- Conference: SEC
- Location: Austin, Texas, US
- Home stadium: Red & Charline McCombs Field (capacity: 1,254)
- Nickname: Longhorns
- Colors: Burnt orange and white

NCAA Tournament champions
- 2025, 2026

NCAA WCWS runner-up
- 2022, 2024

NCAA WCWS appearances
- 1998, 2003, 2005, 2006, 2013, 2022, 2024, 2025, 2026

NCAA super regional appearances
- 2005, 2006, 2012, 2013, 2019, 2021, 2022, 2023, 2024, 2025, 2026

NCAA Tournament appearances
- 1998, 1999, 2000, 2002, 2003, 2005, 2006, 2007, 2008, 2009, 2010, 2011, 2012, 2013, 2014, 2015, 2016, 2017, 2018, 2019, 2021, 2022, 2023, 2024, 2025, 2026

Conference tournament championships
- 1999, 2002, 2003, 2005, 2026

Regular-season conference championships
- 2002, 2003, 2006, 2010, 2024

The Texas Longhorns softball team represents The University of Texas at Austin in NCAA Division I intercollegiate softball competition. The Longhorns competed in the Big 12 Conference through the 2024 season and moved to the Southeastern Conference (SEC) on July 1, 2024.

The University of Texas began varsity intercollegiate competition in softball in 1997; the softball team competed as a club team for one year in 1996. Texas ranks 13th in win percentage among NCAA Division I softball programs with at least 10 seasons in Division I, with an all-time varsity win–loss record of 1,242–506–5 (.710) as of the end of the 2026 season.

The Longhorns have won five regular season conference championships and five conference tournament championships. (The Big 12 did not hold a softball tournament during the 2011 to 2016 seasons.) Texas has made 26 of 29 possible appearances in the NCAA Tournament in 30 seasons of varsity competition through the end of the 2026 season, ranking 12th in all-time tournament wins, with an overall tournament record of 103–57. The Longhorns have reached the Women's College World Series (WCWS) nine times, ranking 14th in WCWS appearances, 10th in WCWS games played, seventh in total WCWS wins (tied with Alabama), and fifth in WCWS win percentage (among teams having played at least 20 WCWS games), with a record of 25–17 (.595) in WCWS competition. Texas ranks fourth in all-time NCAA Division I championships (tied with Arizona State, Florida, and Texas A&M) and is one of seven softball programs with multiple NCAA Division I championships, having won the NCAA Tournament twice, in 2025 and 2026.

The Longhorns play their home games at Red & Charline McCombs Field, where they have compiled a record of 647–161–3 (.800) as of the end of the 2026 season.

Texas was led by former and inaugural head coach Connie Clark from 1997 to 2018. Following Clark’s resignation after the conclusion of the 2018 season, Texas hired eighth-year head coach Mike White, formerly head coach of the Oregon Ducks, on June 25, 2018.

== History ==
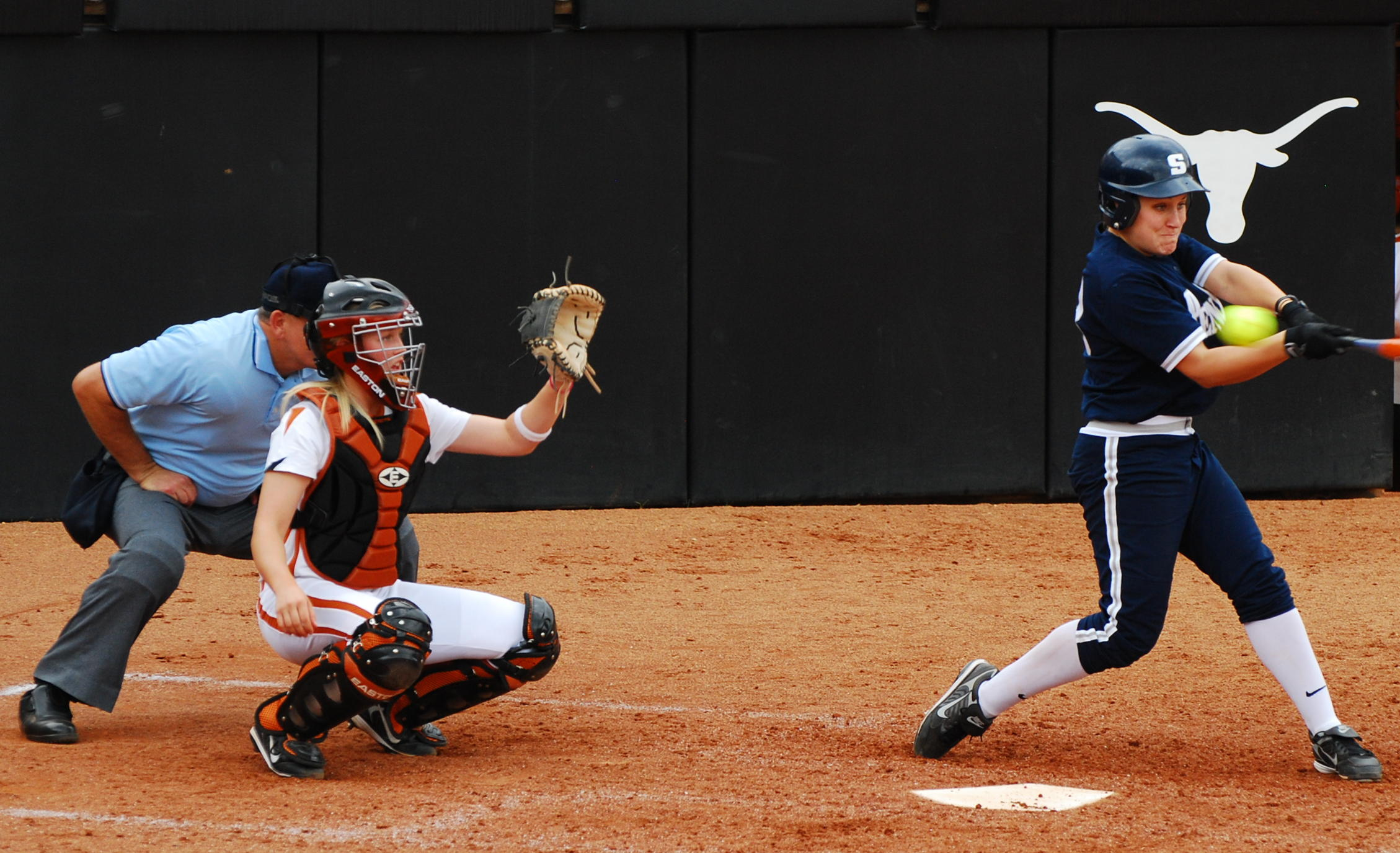
The Longhorns softball team gets the final strike-out to win over Penn State, February 15, 2008

=== Coaching history ===
Years	Coach	Record	%
1997–2018	Connie Clark	873–401–3	.685
2019–present	Mike White	369–105–2	.777

== Championships ==
=== National championships ===
Season	Record	Head coach
2025	56–12	Mike White
2026	53–12	Mike White
2 national championships

=== Conference championships ===
Season	Conference	Record	Head coach
2002	Big 12	17–1	Connie Clark
2003	Big 12	15–2	Connie Clark
2006	Big 12	15–2	Connie Clark
2010	Big 12	14–2	Connie Clark
2024	Big 12	23–4	Mike White
5 conference championships

=== Conference tournament championships ===
Year	Conference	Tournament Location	Head coach
1999	Big 12	Oklahoma City, OK	Connie Clark
2002	Big 12	Oklahoma City, OK	Connie Clark
2003	Big 12	Oklahoma City, OK	Connie Clark
2005	Big 12	Oklahoma City, OK	Connie Clark
2026	SEC	Lexington, KY	Mike White
5 conference tournament championships

== Coaching staff ==
Name	Position coached	Consecutive season at Texas in current position
Mike White	Head Coach	9th
Pattie Ruth Taylor	Assistant Coach	4th
Rick Fermin	Assistant Coach	1st
Amber Freeman	Assistant Coach	1st

== All-time season results ==
Information Source: 2019 Texas Longhorns Softball Media Guide – All-Time Series Records section

Season	Coach	Overall	Conference	Standing	Postseason	Coaches' poll
Connie Clark (Big 12) (1997–2018)
1997	Connie Clark	30–24	6–10	7th		
1998	Connie Clark	49–16	11–5	3rd	Women's College World Series	7
1999	Connie Clark	45–17	10–4	2nd	Region 8 2nd Round	18
2000	Connie Clark	30–27–1	11–5	3rd	Region 6 3rd Round	
2001	Connie Clark	24–29	5–13	9th		
2002	Connie Clark	50–13	17–1	1st	Region 5 Semifinals	16
2003	Connie Clark	49–9	15–2	1st	Women's College World Series	4
2004	Connie Clark	24–25	5–13	8th		
2005	Connie Clark	49–13	11–6	3rd	Women's College World Series	4
2006	Connie Clark	55–9	15–2	1st	Women's College World Series	5
2007	Connie Clark	35–20	8–10	6th	Gainesville Regional	24
2008	Connie Clark	23–23–2	9–9	T-4th	Houston Regional	
2009	Connie Clark	40–20	11–7	T-3rd	Tuscaloosa Regional	
2010	Connie Clark	43–15	14–2	1st	Austin Regional	18
2011	Connie Clark	46–10	14–4	2nd	Austin Regional	19
2012	Connie Clark	47–13	16–8	T-3rd	Austin Super Regional	9
2013	Connie Clark	51–10	14–4	2nd	Women's College World Series	3
2014	Connie Clark	35–23	12–6	3rd	Lafayette Regional	
2015	Connie Clark	38–17	12–6	T-2nd	Los Angeles Regional	
2016	Connie Clark	38–16	10–7	3rd	Lafayette Regional	
2017	Connie Clark	33–26	7–10	4th	College Station Regional	
2018	Connie Clark	33–23	10–8	4th	Seattle Regional	
Connie Clark:		867–398–3 (.685)	243–142 (.631)			
Mike White (Big 12) (2019–2024)
2019	Mike White	46–17	12–6	3rd	Tuscaloosa Super Regional	11
2020	Mike White	24–3			Canceled due to COVID-19	3
2021	Mike White	43–14	12–6	3rd	Stillwater Super Regional	12
2022	Mike White	47–22–1	12–6	3rd	WCWS Runner-up	2
2023	Mike White	45–15–1	11–7	2nd	Knoxville Super Regional	10
2024	Mike White	55–10	23–4	1st	WCWS Runner-up	2
Mike White (SEC) (2025–present)
2025	Mike White	56–12	16–8	3rd	WCWS Champion	1
2026	Mike White	53–12	16–8	T-4th	WCWS Champion	1
Mike White:		369–105–2 (.777)	102–45 (.694)			
Total:		1,242–506–5 (.710)				
National champions College World Series participants Conference regular-season champion Conference regular-season and conference tournament champion Division regular-season champion Division regular-season and conference tournament champion Conference tournament champion

=== NCAA Tournament seeding history ===
National seeding began in 2005. Texas has been a national seed in 12 of the 21 tournaments with national seeding.

Years →	'05	'06	'10	'11	'12	'13	'19	'21	'23	'24	'25	'26
Seeds →	4	3	7	3	6	4	9	12	13	1	6	2

== All-time series records ==
=== All-time series records against SEC members ===
Texas softball leads the all-time series against all SEC opponents but Alabama (which leads 10–6) and Oklahoma (66–29).

Texas vs. current SEC members^{*}
Opponent	Overall Record	Home	Away	Neutral	Postseason	Current Streak
Alabama	6–10	2–2	2–8	2–0	3–4	W 1
Arkansas	9–3	3–2	5–1	1–0	3–1	W 1
Auburn	4–1	4–0	0–0	0–1	1–0	W 3
Florida	8–6	2–0	2–2	4–4	3–2	W 1
Georgia	4–3	0–2	2–1	1–0	1–0	W 2
Kentucky	4–3–1	3–2	0–0	1–1–1	0–0	W 3
LSU	10–7	8–2	2–4	0–1	0–0	W 1
Mississippi State	8–1	3–0	2–1	3–0	2–0	W 2
Missouri	21–20	10–7	7–9	4–4	2–3	W 5
Oklahoma	29–66	14–23	7–27	8–16	5–14	W 1
Ole Miss	8–1	4–0	0–0	4–1	2–0	W 6
South Carolina	5–3	2–1	3–1	0–1	2–0	W 3
Tennessee	10–8	2–2	1–4	7–2	3–4	W 2
Texas A&M	28–25	17–9	7–10	4–6	7–7	L 1
*As of June 6, 2026.

=== Former Big 12 members ===
*Through February 7, 2023.
Information Source: 2019 Texas Longhorns Softball Media Guide – All-Time Series Records section
2019 Season Results

Opponent	Overall Record	Home	Away	Neutral	Postseason	Current Streak
Baylor	38-22	21-8	16-13	1-2	1-2	W2
Iowa State	63-4	28-3	27-0	7-1	6-1	W7
Kansas	46-14	21-4	23-10	2-0	2-0	W15
Nebraska	20-18	9-7	5-8	6-3	5-3	W6
Oklahoma State	38-32	19-12	16-16	1-2	4-6	W2
Texas Tech	63-12	27-4	27-5	6-2	6-2	W12

== Individual honors, awards, and accomplishments ==
=== National honors and awards ===
==== National Player of the Year ====
Three Texas players have won national player of the year awards in five seasons. Texas is the only Division I program with three USA Softball Collegiate Player of the Year awards. Pitcher Cat Osterman, who won the award all three times, is the only player in NCAA history to have won the award more than twice.

National Player of the Year Award recipients
Player	Position	Career	Award Year	Awards
Cat Osterman	P	2002–03, 2005–06	2003	USA Softball Collegiate Player of the Year
Cat Osterman	P	2002–03, 2005–06	2005	USA Softball Collegiate Player of the Year; Honda Sports Award
Cat Osterman	P	2002–03, 2005–06	2006	USA Softball Collegiate Player of the Year; Honda Sports Award
Miranda Elish	P	2019–2020	2020	Softball America Player of the Year
Reese Atwood	C	2023–26	2024	Softball America Player of the Year; D1Softball National Player of the Year

==== Other national awards ====
Other national award recipients
Player	Position	Career	Award Year	Awards
Shealyn O'Leary	P	2019–2022	2020	Softball America Freshman Pitcher of the Year
Reese Atwood	C	2023–2026	2025	NFCA Catcher of the Year; Johnny Bench Award

=== Conference awards and honors ===
Big 12 Player of the Year

- Amy Hooks, 2011
- Taylor Thom, 2014
- Reese Atwood, 2024

Big 12 Pitcher of the Year

- Cat Osterman, 2002, 2003, 2005, 2006
- Blaire Luna, 2010

Big 12 Freshman of the Year

- Jodi Reeves, 1997
- Lindsay Gardner, 2000
- Cat Osterman, 2002
- Chez Sievers, 2003
- Blaire Luna, 2010
- Taylor Thom, 2011
- Tiarra Davis, 2014
- Teagan Kavan, 2024

Big 12 Defensive Player of the Year

- Megan Willis, 2006, 2007

Big 12 Newcomer of the Year

- Christa Williams, 1998

Big 12 Coach of the Year

- Connie Clark, 2002, 2006, 2010
- Mike White, 2024

SEC Player of the Year

- Katie Stewart, 2026

== Home field ==
Home Field	Seasons	Record
East Austin Youth Complex	1997	14–7–0
Red & Charline McCombs Field	1998–present	592–149–3

Through 2024 Season

== Attendance record ==
No.	Date	Opponent	Attendance	Result
1	May 26, 2024	Texas A&M	2,214	W 6–5
2	April 6, 2024	Oklahoma	2,084	W 2–1
3	May 25, 2024	Texas A&M	2,011	W 9–8
4	February 24, 2024	Stanford	1,986	L 3–4
5	February 24, 2024	Colorado State	1,983	W 9–0
6	May 24, 2024	Texas A&M	1,976	L 5–6
7	February 23, 2024	Colorado State	1,959	W 7–0
8	February 25, 2024	Louisiana	1,945	W 5–4
9	May 18, 2024	Northwestern	1,928	W 14–2
10	April 7, 2024	Oklahoma	1,922	W 2–1

Last updated: February 9, 2025

== No-hitters ==
Texas pitchers have thrown 57 no-hitters, including 10 perfect games.

Legend	Perfect Game

#	Date	Pitcher	Opponent	IP	K	BB	HBP	E	Score
1	February 4, 1998	Christa Williams	St. Edward's	4	10	1	0	0	10-0
1	February 4, 1998	Carmen Martinez	St. Edward's	1	0	2	0	0	10-0
2	February 28, 1998	Christa Williams	TWU	7	12	1	0	0	5-0
3	March 6, 1998	Christa Williams	Hofstra	7	13	1	1	0	1-0
4	March 14, 1998	Christa Williams	North Carolina	5	9	4	0	0	8-0
5	April 2, 1999	Christa Williams	Texas A&M	7	11	4	0	0	1-0
6	April 13, 1999	Christa Williams	UTSA	5	10	5	0	2	17-0
7	April 18, 1999	Christa Williams	Oklahoma	8	8	1	0	1	1-0
8	February 7, 2001	Natalie King	St. Edward's	5	5	1	0	0	10-0
9	March 14, 2001	Natalie King	New Mexico State	7	6	3	1	0	3-0
10	February 13, 2002	Cat Osterman	Utah	7	16	3	0	1	3-0
11	February 15, 2002	Cat Osterman	Southwest Texas	7	13	0	0	3	4-0
12	February 26, 2002	Cat Osterman	Stephen F. Austin	7	15	0	0	0	7-0
13	March 27, 2002	Cat Osterman	Baylor	7	17	0	0	0	2-0
14	April 27, 2002	Cat Osterman	Oklahoma State	7	15	0	0	0	5-0
15	February 8, 2003	Cat Osterman	Fresno State	7	18	0	0	0	4-0
16	February 12, 2003	Cat Osterman	UT Arlington	7	17	0	0	1	7-0
17	February 28, 2003	Amy Bradford	North Carolina	7	13	0	1	0	3-0
18	March 1, 2003	Cat Osterman	Florida	7	18	1	0	0	1-0
19	March 5, 2003	Cat Osterman	UTSA	7	17	2	0	0	3-0
20	March 6, 2003	Amy Bradford	Eastern Michigan	5	11	1	0	0	8-0
21	February 16, 2005	Cat Osterman	Texas State	7	17	0	0	0	4-0
22	February 25, 2005	Meagan Denny	BYU	7	15	2	0	0	1-0
23	March 9, 2005	Cat Osterman	UTSA	7	18	0	0	0	2-0
24	March 11, 2005	Cat Osterman	UTEP	7	19	1	0	0	3-0
25	April 26, 2005	Meagan Denny	Texas Tech	7	15	1	0	1	3-0
26	May 12, 2005	Cat Osterman	Nebraska	7	14	2	0	0	3-0
27	May 20, 2005	Cat Osterman	Massachusetts	7	14	1	0	0	1-0
28	May 21, 2005	Cat Osterman	Mississippi State	7	17	0	0	0	2-0
29	February 10, 2006	Cat Osterman	Syracuse	5	11	0	0	1	12-0
30	February 11, 2006	Cat Osterman	Northwestern	7	17	1	0	0	3-0
31	February 17, 2006	Cat Osterman	Fordham	7	17	0	0	1	1-0
32	March 8, 2006	Cat Osterman	North Texas	7	16	0	2	0	5-0
33	April 15, 2006	Cat Osterman	Oklahoma	7	14	0	1	0	2-0
34	April 28, 2007	Meagan Denny	Iowa State	7	11	1	0	1	1-0
35	May 1, 2008	Brittany Barnhill	Texas A&M-Corpus Christi	6	4	2	1	0	8-0
36	February 12, 2010	Blaire Luna	North Carolina	8	6	1	0	0	1-0
37	March 4, 2010	Kim Bruins	Texas Southern	5	3	0	1	0	1-0
38	March 16, 2010	Blaire Luna	North Texas	6	10	5	0	3	0-1
39	May 1, 2010	Blaire Luna	Iowa State	5	12	1	0	0	8-0
40	March 17, 2011	Blaire Luna	Washington	5	9	0	0	0	12-0
41	March 4, 2012	Kim Bruins	Sam Houston State	5	9	1	0	1	14-0
42	February 7, 2013	Blaire Luna	Texas A&M-Corpus Christi	7	14	2	0	1	6-0
43	April 4, 2013	Kim Bruins	Texas Southern	2	1	0	0	0	8-0
43	April 4, 2013	Holly Kern	Texas Southern	1	1	0	0	0	8-0
43	April 4, 2013	Gabby Smith	Texas Southern	1	2	0	0	0	8-0
43	April 4, 2013	Blaire Luna	Texas Southern	1	3	0	0	0	8-0
44	April 6, 2013	Blaire Luna	Western Kentucky	7	16	1	0	0	4-0
45	April 12, 2013	Blaire Luna	Iowa State	5	11	2	0	1	8-0
46	May 26, 2013	Blaire Luna	Florida State	7	13	1	0	0	4-0
47	March 6, 2019	Shealyn O'Leary	Longwood	5	2	1	0	2	9-1
48	March 22, 2019	Miranda Elish	Iowa State	5	8	1	0	0	11-0
49	March 27, 2019	Shealyn O'Leary	Baylor	7	3	0	0	0	2-0
50	March 8, 2020	Miranda Elish	New Mexico	7	10	0	0	0	7-0
51	March 20, 2021	Ariana Adams	New Mexico	5	4	1	1	0	12-0
52	February 27, 2022	Sophia Simpson	UTSA	6	12	4	0	0	8-0
53	February 26, 2023	Citlaly Gutierrez	Texas Southern	5	9	0	0	0	22-0
54	May 19, 2023	Mac Morgan	Seton Hall	4	1	1	0	0	8-0
54	May 19, 2023	Estelle Czech	Seton Hall	1	0	0	0	0	8-0
55	February 9, 2024	Mac Morgan	San Diego	5	5	1	0	1	19-0
56	May 17, 2024	Mac Morgan	Siena	7	4	1	0	0	5-0
57	April 5, 2025	Teagan Kavan	Missouri	5	11	0	0	0	8-0

== Retired numbers ==
Number	Player	Position	Years at Texas
8	Cat Osterman	P	2002–03, 2005–06
