= 2018 Big 12 Conference softball tournament =

- Teams: 6
- Finals site: ASA Hall of Fame Stadium; Oklahoma City, OK
- Champions: Oklahoma (6th title)
- Runner-up: Baylor (1st title game)
- Winning coach: Patty Gasso (6th title)
- MVP: Nicole Pendley (Oklahoma)
- Attendance: 3,075

2018 Big 12 Conference softball standings
	Conf.				Overall
Team	W		L	PCT	W		L	PCT
No. 4 Oklahoma ‍†‍‡‍^{y}	18	–	0	1.000	57	–	5	.919
No. 19 Baylor ‍‍‍^{y}	12	–	6	.667	38	–	18	.679
Oklahoma State ‍‍‍^{y}	12	–	6	.667	39	–	22	.639
No. 25 Texas ‍‍‍^{y}	10	–	8	.556	33	–	26	.559
Texas Tech ‍‍‍	5	–	13	.278	31	–	28	.525
Iowa State ‍‍‍	4	–	14	.222	23	–	33	.411
Kansas ‍‍‍	2	–	16	.111	27	–	25	.519
† – Conference champion ‡ – Tournament champion y – Invited to the NCAA tournament Rankings from NFCA

The 2018 Big 12 Conference softball tournament was held at ASA Hall of Fame Stadium in Oklahoma City, OK from May 11 through May 12, 2018. Oklahoma won their sixth conference tournament and earned the Big 12 Conference's automatic bid to the 2018 NCAA Division I softball tournament.

Oklahoma, Baylor, Oklahoma State and Texas received bids to the NCAA tournament. Oklahoma would go on to play in the 2018 Women's College World Series.

== Standings ==
Place	Seed	Team	Conference			Overall		
Place	Seed	Team	W	L	%	W	L	%
1	1	Oklahoma	18	0	1.000	57	5	.919
2	3	Baylor	12	6	.667	38	18	.679
2	2	Oklahoma State	12	6	.667	39	22	.639
4	4	Texas	10	8	.556	33	26	.559
5	5	Texas Tech	5	13	.278	31	28	.525
6	6	Iowa State	4	14	.222	23	33	.411
7		Kansas	2	16	.111	27	25	.519

- Kansas did not participate in the tournament

== Schedule ==
Game	Time	Matchup	Location	Attendance
Day 1 – Friday, May 11
1	11:00 a.m.	#3 Baylor 7, #2 Oklahoma State 1	OGE Energy Field	2,616
2	11:00 a.m.	#4 Texas 7, #6 Iowa State 0	Integris Field	2,616
3	2:00 p.m.	#1 Oklahoma 10, #4 Texas 1 (6)	OGE Energy Field	2,616
4	2:00 p.m.	#3 Baylor 5, #5 Texas Tech 6	Integris Field	2,616
5	5:00 p.m.	#2 Oklahoma State 7, #5 Texas Tech 6 (9)	OGE Energy Field	2,616
6	7:30 p.m.	#1 Oklahoma 9, #6 Iowa State 6	OGE Energy Field	2,616
Day 2 – Saturday, May 12
7	11:00 a.m.	#6 Iowa State 1, #2 Oklahoma State 5	OGE Energy Field	3,075
8	1:30 p.m.	#4 Texas 9, #5 Texas Tech 2 (11)	OGE Energy Field	3,075
9	4:00 p.m.	#1 Oklahoma 6, #3 Baylor 4	OGE Energy Field	3,075
Game times in CDT. Rankings denote tournament seed.

== All-Tournament Team ==
Position	Player	School
MOP	Nicole Pendley	Oklahoma
1B	Shay Knighten	Oklahoma
3B	Sydney Romero	Oklahoma
LF	Fale Aviu	Oklahoma
CF	Nicole Pendley	Oklahoma
DH	Jocelyn Alo	Oklahoma
P	Paige Lowary	Oklahoma
P	Paige Parker	Oklahoma
LF	Kyla Walker	Baylor
RF	Maddison Kettler	Baylor
P	Gia Rodoni	Baylor
3B	Vanessa Shippy	Oklahoma State
CF	KiAudra Hayter	Texas
P	Brooke Bolinger	Texas
CF	Michaela Cochran	Texas Tech
P	Erin Edmoundson	Texas Tech
