= 2009 Big 12 Conference softball tournament =

- Teams: 10
- Finals site: ASA Hall of Fame Stadium; Oklahoma City, OK
- Champions: Missouri (2nd title)
- Runner-up: Oklahoma (7th title game)
- Winning coach: Ehren Earleywine (1st title)
- MVP: Chelsea Thomas (Missouri)
- Attendance: 4,576

2009 Big 12 Conference softball standings
	Conf.				Overall
Team	W		L	PCT	W		L	PCT
No. 16 Oklahoma ‍†‍‡‍^{y}	14	–	4	.778	41	–	16	.719
No. 8 Missouri ‍‍‍^{y}	12	–	6	.667	50	–	12	.806
No. 15 Baylor ‍‍‍^{y}	11	–	7	.611	40	–	22	.645
Texas ‍‍‍^{y}	11	–	7	.611	40	–	20	.667
Nebraska ‍‍‍^{y}	9	–	9	.500	35	–	19	.648
Texas A&M ‍‍‍^{y}	8	–	9	.471	32	–	22	.593
Oklahoma State ‍‍‍^{y}	8	–	10	.444	36	–	22	.621
Iowa State ‍‍‍	7	–	11	.389	26	–	29	.473
Kansas ‍‍‍	6	–	11	.353	21	–	31	.404
Texas Tech ‍‍‍	3	–	15	.167	15	–	42	.263
† – Conference champion ‡ – Tournament champion y – Invited to the NCAA tournament Rankings from NFCA

The 2009 Big 12 Conference softball tournament was held at ASA Hall of Fame Stadium in Oklahoma City, OK from May 8 through May 10, 2009. Missouri won their second conference tournament and earned the Big 12 Conference's automatic bid to the 2009 NCAA Division I softball tournament.

Oklahoma, Missouri, Baylor, Texas, Nebraska, Texas A&M and Oklahoma State received bids to the NCAA tournament. Missouri would go on to play in the 2009 Women's College World Series.

== Standings ==
Place	Seed	Team	Conference			Overall		
Place	Seed	Team	W	L	%	W	L	%
1	1	Oklahoma	14	4	.778	41	16	.719
2	2	Missouri	12	6	.667	50	12	.806
3	3	Baylor	11	7	.611	40	22	.645
3	4	Texas	11	7	.611	40	20	.667
5	5	Nebraska	9	9	.500	35	19	.648
6	6	Texas A&M	8	9	.471	32	22	.593
7	7	Oklahoma State	8	10	.444	36	22	.621
8	8	Iowa State	7	11	.389	26	29	.473
9	9	Kansas	6	11	.353	21	31	.404
10	10	Texas Tech	3	15	.167	15	42	.263

== Schedule ==
Game	Time	Matchup	Location	Attendance
Day 1 – Friday, May 8
1	5:00 p.m.	#7 Oklahoma State 7, #10 Texas Tech 0	Hall of Fame Stadium	
2	5:00 p.m.	#8 Iowa State 2, #9 Kansas 0	Field 2	
Day 2 – Saturday, May 9
3	11:00 a.m.	#2 Missouri 10, #7 Oklahoma State 0 (5)	Hall of Fame Stadium	1,568
4	11:30 a.m.	#3 Baylor 5, #6 Texas A&M 4	Field 2	1,568
5	1:30 p.m.	#1 Oklahoma 3, #8 Iowa State 0 (9)	Hall of Fame Stadium	1,568
6	2:00 p.m.	#4 Texas 10, #5 Nebraska 5	Field 2	1,568
7	5:00 p.m.	#2 Missouri 1, #3 Baylor 0	Hall of Fame Stadium	1,327
8	7:30 p.m.	#1 Oklahoma 6, #4 Texas 2 (11)	Hall of Fame Stadium	1,327
Day 3 – Sunday, May 10
9	11:30 a.m.	#2 Missouri 5, #1 Oklahoma 1	Hall of Fame Stadium	995
Game times in CDT. Rankings denote tournament seed.

== All-Tournament Team ==
Position	Player	School
MOP	Chelsea Thomas	Missouri
2B	Andee Allen	Missouri
2B	Amber Flores	Oklahoma
INF	Alex Colyer	Baylor
INF	Amanda Bradberry	Iowa State
INF	Julie Brechtel	Nebraska
INF	Karolyne Long	Oklahoma
C	Megan Christopher	Missouri
OF	Rhea Taylor	Missouri
P	Chelsea Thomas	Missouri
P	Whitney Canion	Baylor
P	Stacey Delaney	Missouri
P	D.J. Mathis	Oklahoma
P/UTL	Courtney Craig	Texas
