= 2007 Big 12 Conference softball tournament =

- Teams: 10
- Finals site: ASA Hall of Fame Stadium; Oklahoma City, OK
- Champions: Oklahoma (3rd title)
- Runner-up: Texas Tech (1st title game)
- Winning coach: Patty Gasso (3rd title)
- MVP: Lauren Eckermann (Oklahoma)
- Attendance: 5,175

2007 Big 12 Conference softball standings
	Conf.						Overall
Team	W		L		T	PCT	W		L		T	PCT
No. 5 Baylor ‍†‍‍^{y}	14	–	3	–	0	.824	51	–	16	–	0	.761
No. 11 Oklahoma ‍‍‍^{y}	14	–	4	–	0	.778	55	–	8	–	0	.873
Missouri ‍‍‍^{y}	13	–	4	–	0	.765	40	–	24	–	0	.625
No. 7 Texas A&M ‍‍‡‍^{y}	12	–	6	–	0	.667	46	–	14	–	0	.767
Nebraska ‍‍‍^{y}	10	–	8	–	0	.556	37	–	20	–	0	.649
No. 24 Texas ‍‍‍^{y}	8	–	10	–	0	.444	35	–	20	–	0	.636
Kansas ‍‍‍	7	–	11	–	0	.389	33	–	24	–	1	.578
Texas Tech ‍‍‍	4	–	12	–	0	.250	24	–	27	–	0	.471
Oklahoma State ‍‍‍	3	–	15	–	0	.167	25	–	33	–	0	.431
Iowa State ‍‍‍	3	–	15	–	0	.167	24	–	40	–	0	.375
† – Conference champion ‡ – Tournament champion y – Invited to the NCAA tournament Rankings from NFCA

The 2007 Big 12 Conference softball tournament was held at ASA Hall of Fame Stadium in Oklahoma City, OK from May 11 through May 12, 2007. Oklahoma won their third conference tournament and earned the Big 12 Conference's automatic bid to the 2007 NCAA Division I softball tournament.

Baylor, Oklahoma, Missouri, Texas A&M, Nebraska and Texas received bids to the NCAA tournament. Baylor and Texas A&M would go on to play in the 2007 Women's College World Series.

== Standings ==
Place	Seed	Team	Conference				Overall			
Place	Seed	Team	W	L	T	%	W	L	T	%
1	1	Baylor	14	3	0	.824	51	16	0	.761
2	2	Oklahoma	14	4	0	.778	55	8	0	.873
3	3	Missouri	13	4	0	.765	40	24	0	.625
4	4	Texas A&M	12	6	0	.667	46	14	0	.767
5	5	Nebraska	10	8	0	.556	37	20	0	.649
6	6	Texas	8	10	0	.444	35	20	0	.636
7	7	Kansas	7	11	0	.389	33	24	1	.578
8	8	Texas Tech	4	12	0	.250	24	27	0	.471
9	9	Oklahoma State	3	15	0	.167	25	33	0	.431
9	10	Iowa State	3	15	0	.167	24	40	0	.375

== Schedule ==
Game	Time	Matchup	Location	Attendance
Day 1 – Friday, May 11
1	1:00 p.m.	#7 Kansas 2, #10 Iowa State 1 (8)	Hall of Fame Stadium	
2	1:00 p.m.	#8 Texas Tech 6, #9 Oklahoma State 5 (8)	Field 4	
3	5:39 p.m.	#2 Oklahoma 5, #7 Kansas 0	Hall of Fame Stadium	
4	5:55 p.m.	#3 Missouri 3, #6 Texas 0	Field 4	
Day 2 – Saturday, May 12
5	8:20 p.m.	#8 Texas Tech 8, #1 Baylor 4 (9)	Hall of Fame Stadium	1,416
6	8:10 p.m.	#4 Texas A&M 3, #5 Nebraska 1	Field 4	
7	11:00 a.m.	#8 Texas Tech 4, #4 Texas A&M 3	Hall of Fame Stadium	
8	11:00 a.m.	#2 Oklahoma 7, #3 Missouri 1 (11)	Field 4	1,363
9	3:00 p.m.	#2 Oklahoma 6, #8 Texas Tech 3	Hall of Fame Stadium	1,266
Game times in CDT. Rankings denote tournament seed.

== All-Tournament Team ==
Position	Player	School
MOP	Lauren Eckermann	Oklahoma
3B	Jamie Hinshaw	Texas A&M
IF	Norrelle Dickson	Oklahoma
IF	Savannah Long	Oklahoma
IF	Brandy Moulin	Texas Tech
IF	Robyn Wike	Texas Tech
C	Lindsey Vandever	Oklahoma
C/IF	Jennifer Corkin	Texas Tech
OF	Julie Silver	Missouri
P	Lauren Eckermann	Oklahoma
P	Kassie Humphreys	Kansas
P/IF	Jen Bruck	Missouri
P	Ashly Jacobs	Texas Tech
