= 1997 Big 12 Conference softball tournament =

- Teams: 10
- Finals site: ASA Hall of Fame Stadium; Oklahoma City, OK
- Champions: Missouri (1st title)
- Runner-up: Oklahoma State (1st title game)
- Winning coach: Jay Miller (1st title)
- MVP: Barb Wright (Missouri)
- Attendance: 4,675

1997 Big 12 Conference softball standings
	Conf.						Overall
Team	W		L		T	PCT	W		L		T	PCT
No. 12 Missouri ‍†‍‡‍^{y}	15	–	3	–	0	.833	47	–	16	–	0	.746
No. 18 Oklahoma ‍‍‍^{y}	14	–	4	–	0	.778	55	–	19	–	0	.743
No. 17 Kansas ‍‍‍^{y}	11	–	6	–	0	.647	38	–	23	–	0	.623
No. 25 Nebraska ‍‍‍^{y}	10	–	6	–	0	.625	28	–	22	–	0	.560
No. 10 Oklahoma State ‍‍‍^{y}	10	–	7	–	0	.588	40	–	22	–	0	.645
Texas A&M ‍‍‍	7	–	9	–	0	.438	37	–	29	–	0	.561
Texas ‍‍‍	6	–	10	–	0	.375	30	–	24	–	0	.556
Baylor ‍‍‍	4	–	8	–	0	.333	38	–	22	–	0	.633
Texas Tech ‍‍‍	1	–	13	–	0	.071	34	–	29	–	1	.539
Iowa State ‍‍‍	1	–	13	–	0	.071	17	–	24	–	0	.415
† – Conference champion ‡ – Tournament champion y – Invited to the NCAA tournament Rankings from NFCA/USA Today

The 1997 Big 12 Conference softball tournament was held at ASA Hall of Fame Stadium in Oklahoma City, OK from May 2 through May 4, 1997. Missouri won their first conference tournament and earned the Big 12 Conference's automatic bid to the 1997 NCAA Division I softball tournament.

Missouri, Oklahoma, Kansas, Nebraska and Oklahoma State received bids to the NCAA tournament.

== Standings ==
Place	Seed	Team	Conference				Overall			
Place	Seed	Team	W	L	T	%	W	L	T	%
1	1	Missouri	15	3	0	.833	47	16	0	.746
2	2	Oklahoma	14	4	0	.778	55	19	0	.743
3	3	Kansas	11	6	0	.647	38	23	0	.623
4	4	Nebraska	10	6	0	.625	28	22	0	.560
5	5	Oklahoma State	10	7	0	.588	40	22	0	.645
6	6	Texas A&M	7	9	0	.438	37	29	0	.561
7	7	Texas	6	10	0	.375	30	24	0	.556
8	8	Baylor	4	8	0	.333	38	22	0	.633
9	9	Texas Tech	1	13	0	.071	34	29	1	.539
9	10	Iowa State	1	13	0	.071	17	24	0	.415

== Schedule ==
Game	Time	Matchup	Location	Attendance
Day 1 – Friday, May 2
1	10:10 a.m.	#8 Baylor 1, #9 Texas Tech 0	Hall of Fame Stadium	178
2	12:00 a.m.	#7 Texas 1, #10 Iowa State 0		
3	12:04 p.m.	#1 Missouri 10, #8 Baylor 2 (5)	Hall of Fame Stadium	197
4	2:19 p.m.	#5 Oklahoma State 11, #4 Nebraska 7 (18)	Hall of Fame Stadium	300
5	12:00 a.m.	#2 Oklahoma 6, #7 Texas 5		
6	5:15 p.m.	#3 Kansas 8, #6 Texas A&M 0 (5)	Hall of Fame Stadium	164
9	8:45 p.m.	#1 Missouri 6, #5 Oklahoma State 2	Hall of Fame Stadium	137
Day 2 – Saturday, May 3
7	12:00 a.m.	#4 Nebraska 6, #8 Baylor 2		
8	10:08 a.m.	#6 Texas A&M 6, #7 Texas 1	Hall of Fame Stadium	125
10	10:05 a.m.	#3 Kansas 4, #2 Oklahoma 1	Hall of Fame Stadium	278
11	12:30 p.m.	#5 Oklahoma State 4, #6 Texas A&M 2	Hall of Fame Stadium	351
12	12:00 a.m.	#2 Oklahoma 1, #4 Nebraska 0		
13	5:05 p.m.	#5 Oklahoma State 3, #3 Kansas 2 (8)	Hall of Fame Stadium	773
14	7:45 p.m.	#2 Oklahoma 2, #1 Missouri 0	Hall of Fame Stadium	2,007
Day 3 – Sunday, May 4
15	9:05 a.m.	#5 Oklahoma State 3, #3 Kansas 1	Hall of Fame Stadium	250
16	12:00 a.m.	#1 Missouri 6, #2 Oklahoma 1		
17	2:05 p.m.	#1 Missouri 3, #5 Oklahoma State 1	Hall of Fame Stadium	1,681
Game times in CDT. Rankings denote tournament seed.

== All-Tournament Team ==
Position	Player	School
MOP	Barb Wright	Missouri
1B/OF	Jaime Foutch	Oklahoma State
2B	Jennifer Lizama	Nebraska
3B	Sara McCann	Kansas
SS	Mary Babb	Missouri
SS	Julie Soderlund	Oklahoma State
OF	Julie True	Kansas
OF	Stacy Gemeinhardt	Missouri
OF	Nicky Smith	Missouri
OF	Mindy Johnson	Oklahoma
P	Barb Wright	Missouri
P	Sarah Workman	Kansas
P/DH	Trina Solesbee	Texas A&M
