= 2004 Big 12 Conference softball tournament =

- Teams: 10
- Finals site: ASA Hall of Fame Stadium; Oklahoma City, OK
- Champions: Nebraska (3rd title)
- Runner-up: Missouri (1st title game)
- Winning coach: Rhonda Revelle (3rd title)
- MVP: Peaches James (Nebraska)
- Attendance: 4,517

2004 Big 12 Conference softball standings
	Conf.						Overall
Team	W		L		T	PCT	W		L		T	PCT
No. 14 Nebraska ‍†‍‡‍^{y}	14	–	3	–	0	.824	45	–	17	–	0	.726
Texas A&M ‍‍‍^{y}	13	–	3	–	0	.813	33	–	22	–	0	.600
Missouri ‍‍‍^{y}	13	–	4	–	0	.765	29	–	26	–	0	.527
No. 18 Baylor ‍‍‍^{y}	11	–	6	–	0	.647	48	–	17	–	0	.738
No. 6 Oklahoma ‍‍‍^{y}	11	–	7	–	0	.611	45	–	22	–	1	.669
Oklahoma State ‍‍‍	7	–	10	–	0	.412	27	–	28	–	0	.491
Kansas ‍‍‍	7	–	11	–	0	.389	33	–	28	–	1	.540
Texas ‍‍‍	5	–	13	–	0	.278	24	–	25	–	0	.490
Iowa State ‍‍‍	3	–	13	–	0	.188	13	–	31	–	0	.295
Texas Tech ‍‍‍	2	–	16	–	0	.111	22	–	36	–	0	.379
† – Conference champion ‡ – Tournament champion y – Invited to the NCAA tournament Rankings from NFCA

The 2004 Big 12 Conference softball tournament was held at ASA Hall of Fame Stadium in Oklahoma City, OK from May 12 through May 15, 2004. Nebraska won their third conference tournament and earned the Big 12 Conference's automatic bid to the 2004 NCAA Division I softball tournament.

Nebraska, Texas A&M, Missouri, Baylor and Oklahoma received bids to the NCAA tournament. Oklahoma would go on to play in the 2004 Women's College World Series.

== Standings ==
Place	Seed	Team	Conference				Overall			
Place	Seed	Team	W	L	T	%	W	L	T	%
1	1	Nebraska	14	3	0	.824	45	17	0	.726
2	2	Texas A&M	13	3	0	.813	33	22	0	.600
3	3	Missouri	13	4	0	.765	29	26	0	.527
4	4	Baylor	11	6	0	.647	48	17	0	.738
5	5	Oklahoma	11	7	0	.611	45	22	1	.669
6	6	Oklahoma State	7	10	0	.412	27	28	0	.491
7	7	Kansas	7	11	0	.389	33	28	1	.540
8	8	Texas	5	13	0	.278	24	25	0	.490
9	9	Iowa State	3	13	0	.188	13	31	0	.295
10	10	Texas Tech	2	16	0	.111	22	36	0	.379

== Schedule ==
Game	Time	Matchup	Location	Attendance
Day 1 – Wednesday, May 12
1	5:00 p.m.	#8 Texas 2, #9 Iowa State 0	Hall of Fame Stadium	702
2	5:15 p.m.	#7 Kansas 5, #10 Texas Tech 1	Field 2	702
3	7:30 p.m.	#1 Nebraska 2, #8 Texas 1	Hall of Fame Stadium	702
4	7:30 p.m.	#2 Texas A&M 1, #7 Kansas 0	Field 2	702
Day 2 – Thursday, May 13
5	10:00 a.m.	#5 Oklahoma 5, #4 Baylor 2 (9)	Hall of Fame Stadium	
6	10:00 a.m.	#3 Missouri 4, #6 Oklahoma State 3	Field 2	
Day 3 – Friday, May 14
7	10:00 a.m.	#4 Baylor 2, #8 Texas 1	Hall of Fame Stadium	820
8	10:15 a.m.	#7 Kansas 3, #6 Oklahoma State 0 (11)	Field 2	820
9	12:48 p.m.	#1 Nebraska 7, #5 Oklahoma 0	Hall of Fame Stadium	708
10	3:07 p.m.	#3 Missouri 1, #2 Texas A&M 0 (8)	Hall of Fame Stadium	708
11	5:37 p.m.	#5 Oklahoma 1, #7 Kansas 0	Hall of Fame Stadium	
12	8:00 p.m.	#4 Baylor 2, #2 Texas A&M 1	Hall of Fame Stadium	
Day 4 – Saturday, May 15
13	10:00 a.m.	#3 Missouri 3, #5 Oklahoma 2 (13)	Hall of Fame Stadium	922
14	10:00 a.m.	#1 Nebraska 10, #4 Baylor 1 (5)	Field 4	821
15	6:07 p.m.	#1 Nebraska 1, #3 Missouri 0	Hall of Fame Stadium	663
Game times in CDT. Rankings denote tournament seed.

== All-Tournament Team ==
Position	Player	School
MOP	Peaches James	Nebraska
2B	Anne Steffan	Nebraska
3B	Jessica Yoachim	Nebraska
IF	Jamie Fox	Oklahoma
IF/OF	Sharonda McDonald	Texas A&M
C/IF	Stephanie Pomes	Baylor
OF	Carrie Leerberg	Baylor
OF	Morgan LeCluyse	Missouri
OF	Nicole Trimboli	Nebraska
P/UTL	Peaches James	Nebraska
P	Kara Pierce	Kansas
P	Erica Petersen	Missouri
P	Kami Keiter	Oklahoma
