= 2001 Big 12 Conference softball tournament =

- Teams: 10
- Finals site: ASA Hall of Fame Stadium; Oklahoma City, OK
- Champions: Oklahoma (2nd title)
- Runner-up: Oklahoma State (2nd title game)
- Winning coach: Patty Gasso (2nd title)
- MVP: Lisa Carey (Oklahoma)
- Attendance: 5,649

2001 Big 12 Conference softball standings
	Conf.				Overall
Team	W		L	PCT	W		L	PCT
No. 14 Nebraska ‍†‍‍^{y}	16	–	2	.889	51	–	15	.773
No. 5 Oklahoma ‍‍‡‍^{y}	14	–	2	.875	50	–	9	.847
Texas Tech ‍‍‍^{y}	10	–	8	.556	37	–	24	.607
Kansas ‍‍‍	10	–	8	.556	32	–	27	.542
Oklahoma State ‍‍‍	8	–	8	.500	28	–	23	.549
Baylor ‍‍‍	7	–	9	.438	38	–	22	.633
Texas A&M ‍‍‍	7	–	11	.389	32	–	19	.627
Missouri ‍‍‍	5	–	11	.313	31	–	28	.525
Texas ‍‍‍	5	–	13	.278	24	–	29	.453
Iowa State ‍‍‍	2	–	12	.143	14	–	27	.341
† – Conference champion ‡ – Tournament champion y – Invited to the NCAA tournament Rankings from NFCA/USA Today

The 2001 Big 12 Conference softball tournament was held at ASA Hall of Fame Stadium in Oklahoma City, OK from May 9 through May 12, 2001. Oklahoma won their second conference tournament and earned the Big 12 Conference's automatic bid to the 2001 NCAA Division I softball tournament.

Nebraska, Oklahoma and Texas Tech received bids to the NCAA tournament. Oklahoma would go on to play in the 2001 Women's College World Series.

== Standings ==
Place	Seed	Team	Conference			Overall		
Place	Seed	Team	W	L	%	W	L	%
1	1	Nebraska	16	2	.889	51	15	.773
2	2	Oklahoma	14	2	.875	50	9	.847
3	3	Texas Tech	10	8	.556	37	24	.607
3	4	Kansas	10	8	.556	32	27	.542
5	5	Oklahoma State	8	8	.500	28	23	.549
6	6	Baylor	7	9	.438	38	22	.633
7	7	Texas A&M	7	11	.389	32	19	.627
8	8	Missouri	5	11	.313	31	28	.525
9	9	Texas	5	13	.278	24	29	.453
10	10	Iowa State	2	12	.143	14	27	.341

== Schedule ==
Game	Time	Matchup	Location	Attendance
Day 1 – Wednesday, May 9
1	5:00 p.m.	#8 Missouri 1, #9 Texas 0	Hall of Fame Stadium	1,115
2	5:00 p.m.	#7 Texas A&M 4, #10 Iowa State 0	Field 2	1,115
3	7:27 p.m.	#1 Nebraska 9, #8 Missouri 1 (6)	Hall of Fame Stadium	1,115
4	7:27 p.m.	#2 Oklahoma 7, #7 Texas A&M 0	Field 2	1,115
Day 2 – Thursday, May 10
5	11:30 a.m.	#5 Oklahoma State 2, #4 Kansas 1	Hall of Fame Stadium	
6	11:30 a.m.	#3 Texas Tech 8, #6 Baylor 0 (5)	Field 2	
7	2:00 p.m.	#7 Texas A&M 4, #8 Missouri 0	Hall of Fame Stadium	
8	4:00 p.m.	#4 Kansas 10, #6 Baylor 4	Field 2	
9	5:00 p.m.	#5 Oklahoma State 2, #1 Nebraska 0	Hall of Fame Stadium	
10	8:00 p.m.	#2 Oklahoma 2, #3 Texas Tech 1	Hall of Fame Stadium	
Day 3 – Friday, May 11
11	11:00 a.m.	#3 Texas Tech 1, #7 Texas A&M 0	Hall of Fame Stadium	874
12	1:30 p.m.	#1 Nebraska 3, #4 Kansas 0	Hall of Fame Stadium	874
13	5:45 p.m.	#2 Oklahoma 10, #1 Nebraska 2 (6)	Hall of Fame Stadium	874
14	8:00 p.m.	#3 Texas Tech 1, #5 Oklahoma State 0	Hall of Fame Stadium	874
Day 4 – Saturday, May 12
15	11:30 a.m.	#5 Oklahoma State 2, #3 Texas Tech 1	Hall of Fame Stadium	401
16	3:00 p.m.	#2 Oklahoma 6, #5 Oklahoma State 0	Hall of Fame Stadium	1,703
Game times in CDT. Rankings denote tournament seed.

== All-Tournament Team ==
Position	Player	School
MOP	Lisa Carey	Oklahoma
1B	Lisa Carey	Oklahoma
1B	Jamie Fuente	Nebraska
1B	Jennifer Stump	Oklahoma
1B	Carmen Grindell	Texas Tech
2B	Leigh Suhr	Nebraska
C	Amber Burgess	Nebraska
C	Ashli Barrett	Oklahoma
LF	Christi Musser	Kansas
OF	Amanda Hayes	Oklahoma State
OF	Jade Lindly	Oklahoma State
P	Jennifer Stewart	Oklahoma
P	Amanda Renfro	Texas Tech
