= 2006 Big 12 Conference softball tournament =

- Teams: 10
- Finals site: ASA Hall of Fame Stadium; Oklahoma City, OK
- Champions: Kansas (1st title)
- Runner-up: Oklahoma (5th title game)
- Winning coach: Tracy Bunge (1st title)
- MVP: Serena Settlemier (Kansas)
- Attendance: 5,557

2006 Big 12 Conference softball standings
	Conf.						Overall
Team	W		L		T	PCT	W		L		T	PCT
No. 5 Texas ‍†‍‍^{y}	15	–	2	–	0	.882	55	–	9	–	0	.859
No. 14 Nebraska ‍‍‍^{y}	13	–	4	–	0	.765	44	–	12	–	0	.786
No. 20 Baylor ‍‍‍^{y}	12	–	6	–	0	.667	38	–	22	–	0	.633
No. 22 Texas A&M ‍‍‍^{y}	11	–	6	–	0	.647	34	–	19	–	0	.642
No. 19 Oklahoma ‍‍‡‍^{y}	8	–	10	–	0	.444	40	–	21	–	1	.653
Kansas ‍‍‍^{y}	8	–	10	–	0	.444	36	–	26	–	0	.581
Missouri ‍‍‍	7	–	11	–	0	.389	26	–	27	–	0	.491
Oklahoma State ‍‍‍	5	–	13	–	0	.278	21	–	29	–	0	.420
Iowa State ‍‍‍	5	–	13	–	0	.278	23	–	28	–	0	.451
Texas Tech ‍‍‍	4	–	13	–	0	.235	19	–	35	–	0	.352
† – Conference champion ‡ – Tournament champion y – Invited to the NCAA tournament Rankings from NFCA

The 2006 Big 12 Conference softball tournament was held at ASA Hall of Fame Stadium in Oklahoma City, OK from May 10 through May 13, 2006. Kansas won their first conference tournament and earned the Big 12 Conference's automatic bid to the 2006 NCAA Division I softball tournament.

Texas, Nebraska, Baylor, Texas A&M, Oklahoma and Kansas received bids to the NCAA tournament. Texas would go on to play in the 2006 Women's College World Series.

== Standings ==
Place	Seed	Team	Conference				Overall			
Place	Seed	Team	W	L	T	%	W	L	T	%
1	1	Texas	15	2	0	.882	55	9	0	.859
2	2	Nebraska	13	4	0	.765	44	12	0	.786
3	3	Baylor	12	6	0	.667	38	22	0	.633
4	4	Texas A&M	11	6	0	.647	34	19	0	.642
5	5	Oklahoma	8	10	0	.444	40	21	1	.653
5	6	Kansas	8	10	0	.444	36	26	0	.581
7	7	Missouri	7	11	0	.389	26	27	0	.491
8	8	Oklahoma State	5	13	0	.278	21	29	0	.420
8	9	Iowa State	5	13	0	.278	23	28	0	.451
10	10	Texas Tech	4	13	0	.235	19	35	0	.352

== Schedule ==
Game	Time	Matchup	Location	Attendance
Day 1 – Wednesday, May 10
1	5:00 p.m.	#8 Oklahoma State 2, #9 Iowa State 0	Hall of Fame Stadium	875
2	5:00 p.m.	#7 Missouri 6, #10 Texas Tech 3	Field 4	875
3	7:30 p.m.	#8 Oklahoma State 2, #1 Texas 1	Hall of Fame Stadium	875
4	7:30 p.m.	#7 Missouri 3, #2 Nebraska 0	Field 4	875
Day 2 – Thursday, May 11
5	11:00 a.m.	#5 Oklahoma 13, #4 Texas A&M 6 (9)	Hall of Fame Stadium	907
6	11:00 a.m.	#6 Kansas 5, #3 Baylor 1	Field 4	907
7	2:00 p.m.	#4 Texas A&M 5, #1 Texas 0	Hall of Fame Stadium	907
8	2:00 p.m.	#2 Nebraska 7, #3 Baylor 1 (11)	Field 4	907
9	5:00 p.m.	#5 Oklahoma 10, #8 Oklahoma State 2 (5)	Hall of Fame Stadium	941
10	7:30 p.m.	#6 Kansas 2, #7 Missouri 0	Hall of Fame Stadium	941
Day 3 – Friday, May 12
11	11:00 a.m.	#2 Nebraska 1, #8 Oklahoma State 0 (8)	Hall of Fame Stadium	626
12	1:30 p.m.	#7 Missouri 5, #4 Texas A&M 3	Hall of Fame Stadium	626
13	4:30 p.m.	#6 Kansas 2, #2 Nebraska 0	Hall of Fame Stadium	1,047
14	7:00 p.m.	#5 Oklahoma 4, #7 Missouri 0	Hall of Fame Stadium	1,047
Day 4 – Saturday, May 13
15	3:00 p.m.	#6 Kansas 4, #5 Oklahoma 2	Hall of Fame Stadium	1,161
Game times in CDT. Rankings denote tournament seed.

== All-Tournament Team ==
Position	Player	School
MOP	Serena Settlemier	Kansas
2B	Jessica Moppin	Kansas
IF/OF	Jami Lobpries	Texas A&M
UTL	Amber Spaulding	Oklahoma
C	Samantha Ricketts	Oklahoma
OF	Kristin Vesely	Oklahoma
OF	Lacy Darity	Oklahoma State
P	Serena Settlemier	Kansas
P/1B	Kassie Humphreys	Kansas
P	Jen Bruck	Missouri
P	Ashley DeBuhr	Nebraska
P	D.J. Mathis	Oklahoma
P/1B	Megan Gibson	Texas A&M
