= 1998 Big 12 Conference softball tournament =

- Teams: 10
- Finals site: ASA Hall of Fame Stadium; Oklahoma City, OK
- Champions: Nebraska (1st title)
- Runner-up: Oklahoma (2nd title game)
- Winning coach: Rhonda Revelle (1st title)
- MVP: Jenny Voss (Nebraska)
- Attendance: 4,675

1998 Big 12 Conference softball standings
	Conf.						Overall
Team	W		L		T	PCT	W		L		T	PCT
No. 5 Nebraska ‍†‍‡‍^{y}	16	–	0	–	0	1.000	48	–	12	–	0	.800
No. 11 Oklahoma ‍‍‍^{y}	12	–	5	–	0	.706	49	–	15	–	0	.766
No. 7 Texas ‍‍‍^{y}	11	–	5	–	0	.688	49	–	16	–	0	.754
No. 24 Texas Tech ‍‍‍	10	–	7	–	0	.588	45	–	19	–	0	.703
No. 4 Oklahoma State ‍‍‍^{y}	9	–	7	–	0	.563	42	–	19	–	0	.689
Kansas ‍‍‍	7	–	11	–	0	.389	28	–	34	–	0	.452
Texas A&M ‍‍‍	6	–	10	–	1	.382	32	–	25	–	2	.559
Iowa State ‍‍‍	5	–	11	–	0	.313	16	–	27	–	0	.372
Missouri ‍‍‍	5	–	13	–	0	.278	36	–	20	–	0	.643
Baylor ‍‍‍	2	–	14	–	1	.147	20	–	36	–	1	.360
† – Conference champion ‡ – Tournament champion y – Invited to the NCAA tournament Rankings from NFCA/USA Today

The 1998 Big 12 Conference softball tournament was held at ASA Hall of Fame Stadium in Oklahoma City, OK from April 30 through May 3, 1998. Nebraska won their first conference tournament and earned the Big 12 Conference's automatic bid to the 1998 NCAA Division I softball tournament.

Nebraska, Oklahoma, Texas and Oklahoma State received bids to the NCAA tournament. Nebraska, Texas and Oklahoma State would go on to play in the 1998 Women's College World Series.

== Standings ==
Place	Seed	Team	Conference				Overall			
Place	Seed	Team	W	L	T	%	W	L	T	%
1	1	Nebraska	16	0	0	1.000	48	12	0	.800
2	2	Oklahoma	12	5	0	.706	49	15	0	.766
3	3	Texas	11	5	0	.688	49	16	0	.754
4	4	Texas Tech	10	7	0	.588	45	19	0	.703
5	5	Oklahoma State	9	7	0	.563	42	19	0	.689
6	6	Kansas	7	11	0	.389	28	34	0	.452
7	7	Texas A&M	6	10	1	.382	32	25	2	.559
8	8	Iowa State	5	11	0	.313	16	27	0	.372
9	9	Missouri	5	13	0	.278	36	20	0	.643
10	10	Baylor	2	14	1	.147	20	36	1	.360

== Schedule ==
Game	Time	Matchup	Location	Attendance
Day 1 – Thursday, April 30
1	5:00 p.m.	#8 Iowa State 2, #9 Missouri 0	ASA Stadium	343
2	7:30 p.m.	#10 Baylor 6, #7 Texas A&M 2	ASA Stadium	476
Day 2 – Friday, May 1
3	10:00 a.m.	#1 Nebraska 1, #8 Iowa State 0	ASA Stadium	678
4	10:00 a.m.	#5 Oklahoma State 1, #4 Texas Tech 0	Field 2	518
5	12:30 p.m.	#2 Oklahoma 3, #10 Baylor 2	ASA Stadium	515
6	12:30 p.m.	#3 Texas 1, #6 Kansas 0	Field 2	519
7	3:00 p.m.	#4 Texas Tech 3, #8 Iowa State 1	ASA Stadium	425
8	3:00 p.m.	#6 Kansas 3, #10 Baylor 1	Field 2	315
9	5:30 p.m.	#1 Nebraska 1, #5 Oklahoma State 0	ASA Stadium	967
10	8:00 p.m.	#2 Oklahoma 1, #3 Texas 0	ASA Stadium	1,544
Day 3 – Saturday, May 2
11	10:00 a.m.	#5 Oklahoma State 1, #6 Kansas 0	ASA Stadium	528
12	12:30 p.m.	#3 Texas 3, #4 Texas Tech 0	ASA Stadium	469
13	5:30 p.m.	#2 Oklahoma 3, #5 Oklahoma State 2	ASA Stadium	2,000
14	8:00 p.m.	#1 Nebraska 1, #3 Texas 0 (10)	ASA Stadium	2,167
Day 4 – Sunday, May 3
15	2:00 p.m.	#1 Nebraska 3, #2 Oklahoma 0	ASA Stadium	949
Game times in CDT. Rankings denote tournament seed.

== All-Tournament Team ==
Position	Player	School
MOP	Jenny Voss	Nebraska
2B/SS	Jodi Reeves	Texas
SS	Michelle Hubler	Kansas
SS	Ali Viola	Nebraska
SS	Lisa Carey	Oklahoma
C	Jenny Smith	Nebraska
OF/IF	Naomi Fitzgerald	Baylor
OF	Sara Holland	Kansas
OF	Deborah Hargrave	Oklahoma
OF/SS	Casey Acree	Oklahoma State
P	Jenny Voss	Nebraska
P/DP	Christie McCoy	Nebraska
P/UTL	Christa Williams	Texas
