= 1996 Big 12 Conference softball tournament =

- Teams: 8
- Finals site: ASA Hall of Fame Stadium; Oklahoma City, OK
- Champions: Oklahoma (1st title)
- Runner-up: Nebraska (1st title game)
- Winning coach: Patty Gasso (1st title)
- MVP: Jill Most (Oklahoma)

1996 Big 12 Conference softball standings
	Conf.				Overall
Team	W		L	PCT	W		L	PCT
No. 12 Oklahoma ‍†‍‡‍^{y}	17	–	5	.773	50	–	20	.714
No. 15 Oklahoma State ‍†‍‍^{y}	17	–	5	.773	37	–	20	.649
Missouri ‍‍‍	10	–	8	.556	31	–	22	.585
No. 17 Nebraska ‍‍‍^{y}	10	–	8	.556	42	–	23	.646
No. 21 Texas A&M ‍‍‍^{y}	11	–	11	.500	39	–	21	.650
Kansas ‍‍‍	10	–	12	.455	31	–	26	.544
Iowa State ‍‍‍	6	–	13	.316	17	–	28	.378
Texas Tech ‍‍‍	1	–	20	.048	4	–	44	.083
† – Conference champion ‡ – Tournament champion y – Invited to the NCAA tournament Rankings from NFCA/USA Today

The 1996 Big 12 Conference softball tournament was held at ASA Hall of Fame Stadium in Oklahoma City, Oklahoma from May 10 to May 11, 1996. As the tournament winner, Oklahoma earned the Big 12 Conference's automatic bid to the 1996 NCAA Division I softball tournament.

== Schedule ==
Game	Time	Matchup	Location	Attendance
First Round – Friday, May 10
1	10:00 a.m.	#7 Iowa State 4, #8 Texas Tech 3		
2	12:10 p.m.	#1 Oklahoma 5, #4 Nebraska 4		
3	5:20 p.m.	#2 Oklahoma State 11, #3 Missouri 4		
4	3:15 p.m.	#5 Texas A&M 3, #6 Kansas 1		
5	7:45 p.m.	#4 Nebraska 2, #7 Iowa State 1		1,134
6	10:10 p.m.	#3 Missouri 5, #5 Texas A&M 1		1,134
Championship Round – Saturday, May 11
7	10:10 a.m.	#1 Oklahoma 5, #2 Oklahoma State 0		
8	12:30 p.m.	#4 Nebraska 7, #3 Missouri 0		
9	2:35 p.m.	#4 Nebraska 1, #2 Oklahoma State 0		1,187
10	4:45 p.m.	#1 Oklahoma 1, #4 Nebraska 0		1,237
Game times in CDT. Rankings denote tournament seed.

=== Championship game ===
Big 12 tournament championship
Nebraska	0–1	Oklahoma

May 11, 1996 – 4:45 p.m. (CDT) at ASA Hall of Fame Stadium in Oklahoma City, Oklahoma
Team	1	2	3	4	5	6	7	R	H	E
Nebraska	0	0	0	0	0	0	0	0	4	0
Oklahoma	0	0	0	0	0	0	1	1	3	0
WP: Jill Most (27–11) LP: Stacie Stafford (19–13); Attendance: 1,237; Boxscore

== All-Tournament Team ==
Position	Player	School
MOP	Jill Most	Oklahoma
1B	Casey Dickson	Oklahoma
2B/OF	Cindy Smith	Oklahoma State
3B	Nicole Myers	Oklahoma
SS	Ali Viola	Nebraska
IF	Raven Coberg	Iowa State
UTL	Michele Ryan	Oklahoma State
C	Missy Panzer	Oklahoma
OF	Stacy Bailey	Missouri
OF	Karla Knicely	Nebraska
OF	Angela Howell	Oklahoma
P	Jill Most	Oklahoma
P/DP	Angela Blackwood	Nebraska
P	Stacie Stafford	Nebraska
