= List of Nebraska Cornhuskers head softball coaches =

The Nebraska Cornhuskers softball program is a college softball team that represents the University of Nebraska–Lincoln in the Big Ten Conference in the National Collegiate Athletic Association. The team has had 5 head coaches since it started playing organized softball in the 1977 season. The current coach is Rhonda Revelle, who took over the head coaching position in 1993.

Revelle holds all major softball coaching records at Nebraska, having served for 33 seasons, recording 1,170 wins, and leading the Huskers to three Women's College World Series appearances.

== Key ==
General
| # | Number of coaches (Note: A running total of the number of head coaches.) |
| GC | Games coached |

Overall
| OW | Wins |
| OL | Losses |
| OT | Ties |
| O% | Winning percentage |

Conference (Note: Nebraska was a member of the Big Eight Conference from 1977 to 1996, when the Big 8 merged with the remnants of the Southwest Conference to form the Big 12 Conference. The Huskers joined the Big Ten Conference in 2012.)
| CW | Wins |
| CL | Losses |
| CT | Ties |
| C% | Winning percentage |

Postseason (Note: Postseason play involving the NCAA Division I Softball Championship or AIAW Women's College World Series.)
| PA | Total Appearances (Note: Postseason appearances include seasons with NCAA Division I Softball Championship bids since the tournament began in 1982.) |
| PW | Total Wins |
| PL | Total Losses |
| WA | Women's College World Series appearances (Note: College World Series appearances include seasons with WCWS bids since the tournament began in 1969.) |
| WW | Women's College World Series wins |
| WL | Women's College World Series losses |

Championships
| CC | Conference regular season |
| CT | Conference tournament |
| NC | National championships (Note: Women's College World Series sponsored by either the AIAW or NCAA.) |

== Coaches ==
List of head softball coaches showing season(s) coached, overall records, conference records, postseason records, championships and selected awards (Note: Statistics correct as of the end of the 2025 NCAA Division I softball season.)
| # | Name | Term | GC | OW | OL | OT | O% | CW | CL | CT | C% | PA | WA | CCs | CTs | NCs |
|---|---|---|---|---|---|---|---|---|---|---|---|---|---|---|---|---|
| 1 | Don Isherwood | 1977–1980 | 191 | 106 | 85 | — | .555 | 16 | 24 | — | .400 | — | — | — | — | — |
| 2 | Nancy Plantz | 1981–1983 | 130 | 77 | 53 | — | .592 | 17 | 16 | — | .515 | 1 | 1 | 1 | 1 | — |
| 3 | Wayne Daigle | 1984–1986 | 141 | 110 | 31 | — | .780 | 26 | 6 | — | .813 | 2 | 2 | 3 | 3 | — |
| 4 | Ron Wolforth | 1987–1992 | 314 | 188 | 126 | — | .599 | 29 | 25 | — | .537 | 2 | 2 | 2 | 2 | — |
| 5 | Rhonda Revelle | 1993–present | 1,850 | 1,170 | 680 | — | .632 | 379 | 256 | — | .594 | 23 | 3 | 4 | 4 | — |
