= Patty Gasso =

American softball coach

Current position
- Title: Head coach
- Team: Oklahoma
- Conference: SEC
- Record: 1,567–361–2
- Annual salary: $1.9 million

Biographical details
- Born: May 27, 1962 (age 64); Los Angeles, California, U.S.
- Education: Long Beach State (Class of 1984)

Playing career
- 1981–1982: El Camino
- 1983–1984: Long Beach State

Coaching career (HC unless noted)

College softball
- 1990–1994: Long Beach City
- 1995–present: Oklahoma

National softball
- 2025–present: Team USA women's softball

Head coaching record
- Overall: Junior college: 161–59–1 (.731); NCAA: 1,567–361–2 (.812)

Accomplishments and honors

Championships
- 8× Women's College World Series (2000, 2013, 2016, 2017, 2021–2024); 15× Big 12 regular season (1996, 1999, 2000, 2009, 2012–2019, 2021–2023); SEC tournament (2025); SEC regular season (2025); Big Eight regular season (1995); 9× Big 12 Tournament (1996, 2001, 2007, 2010, 2017, 2018, 2021, 2023, 2024)

Awards
- 7× NFCA National Coaching Staff of the Year (2000, 2013, 2016, 2017, 2022–2024); 10× NFCA Central Regional Coaching Staff of the Year (2012–2019, 2021, 2022); 3× Speedline/NFCA Midwest Region Coaching Staff of the Year (1999–2001); C.Vivian Stringer Coaching Award (2017); CCCAA Coach of the Year (1992); NFCA West Regional Coach of the Year (1992); 15× Big 12 Coach of the Year (1996, 1999, 2000, 2009, 2012–2019, 2021–2023); SEC Coach of the Year (2025); National Fastpitch Coaches Association Hall of Fame (2012)

Records
- Most Big 12 wins by a coach in league History (428); Most Wins by a coach at Oklahoma (1,567)

Patricia Marie Gasso (née Froehlich; born May 27, 1962) is an American softball coach for the Oklahoma Sooners and United States women's national softball team. She has been the head softball coach at the University of Oklahoma since 1995. She has led the Sooners to eight national championships (2000, 2013, 2016, 2017, 2021, 2022, 2023, and 2024) and has compiled a career record of 1,567–361–2 and a winning percentage of .812.

== Early life ==
Born Patricia Marie Froehlich in Los Angeles, Gasso grew up in Torrance, California. She played softball at California State University, Long Beach. She also coached softball at Long Beach City College from 1990 to 1994, compiling a record of 161–59–1.

== Oklahoma (1995–present) ==
In 31 years at the University of Oklahoma, she has compiled a record of 1,567–361–2 and a winning percentage of .812. Her teams have advanced to the Women's College World Series fourteen times and won the national championship eight times in 2000, 2013, 2016, 2017, 2021, 2022, 2023 and 2024. Her winning percentage of .812 ranks the highest of Division I college softball coaches with at least 1,000 career wins.

In 1999, the University of Oklahoma won its third Big 12 Conference championship in five years at Oklahoma, but financial difficulties nearly ended her tenure following the 1999 season. Gasso noted:

Money was tight, and my husband, Jim, had actually gone back to California because it was hard to find a job here at the time. So here I was raising our two children and trying to coach a Division-I softball program, which was very demanding of my time and energy.

Gasso remained in Oklahoma for the 2000 season despite her husband's return to California. The 2000 University of Oklahoma team compiled a record of 66–8 and defeated UCLA three to one in the Women's College World Series to win the Sooners' first softball national championship.

Following the national championship in 2000, the University of Oklahoma gave Gasso "a significant salary hike," and her husband was able to return to Oklahoma. Over the next 12 years, Gasso built the Sooners into a national softball power, winning over 40 games every year. The 2001 team finished with a 50–9 record, and the 2007 team finished 55–8.

Gasso's 2012 team advanced to the finals of the Women's College World Series but lost the national championship in a close series against Alabama. The 2012 team finished its season with a 54–10 record. In late June 2012, the Oklahoma University Board of Regents extended Gasso's contract through the 2017 season.

Gasso was inducted into the National Fastpitch Coaches Association (NFCA) Hall of Fame in 2012.

Gasso reached a milestone on March 15, 2015, when she got her 1,000th win as the head coach of Oklahoma in a resounding win over East Carolina.

On June 6, 2017, Gasso and the Sooner softball team swept Florida in the national championship, winning Gasso her second national championship in two years and fourth overall.

On June 10, 2021, Gasso's Sooners defeated Florida State in the national championship, winning Gasso's and the school's fifth national championship.

On June 8, 2022, Gasso's Sooners defeated Texas in the national championship, winning Gasso's and the school's sixth national championship.

On June 8, 2023, Gasso's Sooners defeated Florida State in the national championship, winning Gasso's and the school's seventh national championship, and their third consecutive championship. They became the first team to three-peat since UCLA from 1988 to 1990. The 2023 team nearly finished the season undefeated with a record of 61–1. Their only loss came in February to Baylor, 4–3, during an early season tournament played in Waco, Texas.

On June 6, 2024, Gasso's Sooners again defeated Texas in the national championship series, in a rematch from 2022, winning Gasso's and the school's eighth national championship. Gasso's eight national titles tied Arizona's Mike Candrea for the most by any coach in Division I softball history. With the win, Oklahoma became the first team in college softball history to four-peat.

== Team USA (2025–present) ==
On February 3, 2025, Gasso was named the head coach of the United States women's national softball team through the 2028 quadrennial cycle.

At the 2025 World Games in Chengdu, China, Gasso led Team USA to gold, winning all five of their matches.

== Personal life ==
Gasso's son, DJ, is the head coach for Tulsa. Her other son, JT, is an associate head coach for Oklahoma.

== Head coaching record ==
The following table lists Gasso's head coaching record at the NCAA level.

Record table
Season	Team	Overall	Conference	Standing	Postseason
Oklahoma Sooners (Big Eight Conference) (1995)
1995	Oklahoma	43–23	12–4	1st	NCAA Regional
Oklahoma Sooners (Big 12 Conference) (1996–2024)
1996	Oklahoma	50–20	17–5	1st	NCAA Regional
1997	Oklahoma	55–19	14–4	2nd	NCAA Regional
1998	Oklahoma	49–15	12–5	2nd	NCAA Regional
1999	Oklahoma	40–16	11–3	1st	NCAA Regional
2000	Oklahoma	66–8	17–1	1st	WCWS Champions
2001	Oklahoma	50–9	14–2	2nd	Women's College World Series
2002	Oklahoma	49–16	14–2	2nd	Women's College World Series
2003	Oklahoma	47–14	12–6	4th	Women's College World Series
2004	Oklahoma	45–22–1	11–7	5th	Women's College World Series
2005	Oklahoma	50–17	12–6	2nd	NCAA Super Regional
2006	Oklahoma	40–21–1	8–10	5th	NCAA Regional
2007	Oklahoma	55–8	14–4	2nd	NCAA Super Regional
2008	Oklahoma	47–14	16–2	2nd	NCAA Super Regional
2009	Oklahoma	41–16	14–4	1st	NCAA Regional
2010	Oklahoma	47–12	13–3	2nd	NCAA Super Regional
2011	Oklahoma	43–19	10–8	5th	Women's College World Series
2012	Oklahoma	54–10	19–5	1st	Women's College World Series (Runner-Up)
2013	Oklahoma	57–4	15–2	1st	WCWS Champions
2014	Oklahoma	51–13	16–2	1st	Women's College World Series
2015	Oklahoma	49–9	14–2	1st	NCAA Super Regional
2016	Oklahoma	57–8	17–1	1st	WCWS Champions
2017	Oklahoma	61–9	17–1	1st	WCWS Champions
2018	Oklahoma	57–5	18–0	1st	Women's College World Series
2019	Oklahoma	57–6	18–0	1st	Women's College World Series (Runner-Up)
2020	Oklahoma	20–4	0–0		Season canceled due to COVID-19
2021	Oklahoma	56–4	15–1	1st	WCWS Champions
2022	Oklahoma	59–3	17–1	1st	WCWS Champions
2023	Oklahoma	61–1	18–0	1st	WCWS Champions
2024	Oklahoma	59–7	22–5	2nd	WCWS Champions
Oklahoma Sooners (Southeastern Conference) (2025–present)
2025	Oklahoma	52–9	17–7	1st	Women's College World Series
2026	Oklahoma	52–10	20–4	1st	NCAA Super Regional
Oklahoma:		104–19 (.846)	37–11 (.771)		
Oklahoma:		1,619–371–2 (.813)	Big Eight: 12–4 (.750); Big 12: 415–92 (.819); SEC: 37–11 (.771)		
Total:		1,619–371–2 (.813)			
National champion Postseason invitational champion Conference regular season champion Conference regular season and conference tournament champion Division regular season champion Division regular season and conference tournament champion Conference tournament champion

== See also ==
- List of college softball coaches with 1,000 wins
