= Bob Brock =

American college softball coach

Biographical details
- Education: Sam Houston State

Coaching career (HC unless noted)
- Baylor: 1980–1981
- Texas A&M: 1982–1996
- Tennessee (Asst.): 1999–2001
- Sam Houston State: 2002–2018

Head coaching record
- Overall: 1126–776–1 (.592)

Bob Brock is a retired college softball coach. He is most notable for his time as head coach of Texas A&M, during which his teams won three national championships, finished as national runner-up twice, made one additional appearance in the Women's College World Series, and another four appearances in NCAA regional tournaments. He later served as head coach of the Tampa Bay Firestix of the Women's Pro Softball League and Sam Houston State. Brock won his 1,000th game in 2012, and was inducted into the National Fastpitch Coaches Association Hall of Fame in 2016.
