= Rhonda Revelle =

American softball coach

Current position
- Title: Head coach
- Team: Nebraska
- Conference: Big Ten
- Record: 1,222–688 (.640)

Biographical details
- Born: 1961 or 1962 (age 63–64); Creswell, Oregon, U.S.
- Education: Nebraska

Playing career
- 1981–1983: Nebraska

Coaching career (HC unless noted)
- 1986: Nebraska Wesleyan (asst.)
- 1987: Nebraska Wesleyan
- 1988: California State – Hayward (asst.)
- 1989–1992: San Jose State (asst.)
- 1993–present: Nebraska

Administrative career (AD unless noted)
- 1999–2002: National Fastpitch Coaches Association (President)
- 2005–2006: National Fastpitch Coaches Association (President)
- 2006–2008: Nebraska (Senior Woman Administrator)
- 2013–2016: National Fastpitch Coaches Association (President)

Head coaching record
- Overall: 1,230–704 (.636)

Accomplishments and honors

Championships
- 3× Big 12 Conference Tournament (1998, 2000, 2004); 2× Big Ten Tournament (2022, 2026); Big Ten champion (2026)

Awards
- National Fastpitch Coaches Association Hall of Fame (2010); 2× Big 12 Coach of the Year (1998, 2001); 2× Big Ten Coach of the Year (2014, 2026)

Rhonda Revelle (born 1961 or 1962) is an American softball coach and former collegiate pitcher, who is the current head coach for Nebraska. Revelle played at Nebraska from 1981 to 1983, reaching the inaugural Women's College World Series. She later led the Huskers to the 1998 Women's College World Series, becoming one of three people to reach the WCWS as a player and a head coach, and the first to do so at their alma mater.

== Coaching career ==
=== Nebraska ===
Revelle was hired as Nebraska's fifth head coach in 1993 and is currently the school's all-time wins leader. She has led the Cornhuskers to the NCAA Tournament 20 times, reaching the Women's College World Series in 1998, 2002, 2013 and 2026.

On July 10, 2019, Revelle was placed on paid administrative leave while school administration investigated complaints of verbal and emotional abuse against players. On August 30, 2019, Revelle was reinstated as head coach.

== Head coaching record ==
Record table
Season	Team	Overall	Conference	Standing	Postseason
Nebraska Wesleyan (Nebraska Intercollegiate Athletics Conference) (1987–present)
1987	Nebraska-Wesleyan	8–16	7–5		
Nebraska-Wesleyan:		8–16 (.333)	7–5 (.583)		
Nebraska Cornhuskers (Big Eight Conference) (1993–1996)
1993	Nebraska	18–23	5–11	5th	
1994	Nebraska	21–33	1–15	6th	
1995	Nebraska	43–20	10–6	3rd	NCAA Regional
1996	Nebraska	42–23	10–8	T-3rd	NCAA Regional
Nebraska Cornhuskers (Big 12 Conference) (1997–2011)
1997	Nebraska	29–24	10–6	4th	NCAA Regional
1998	Nebraska	48–12	16–0	1st	Women's College World Series
1999	Nebraska	35–21	10–8	4th	NCAA Regional
2000	Nebraska	52–21	15–2	2nd	NCAA Regional
2001	Nebraska	51–15	16–2	1st	NCAA Regional
2002	Nebraska	50–14	11–5	3rd	Women's College World Series
2003	Nebraska	39–17	10–8	T-5th	NCAA Regional
2004	Nebraska	45–17	14–3	1st	NCAA Regional
2005	Nebraska	36–23	9–9	7th	NCAA Regional
2006	Nebraska	44–12	13–4	2nd	NCAA Regional
2007	Nebraska	37–20	10–8	5th	NCAA Regional
2008	Nebraska	25–28	4–14	T-9th	
2009	Nebraska	35–19	9–9	5th	NCAA Regional
2010	Nebraska	30–29	7–11	T-5th	NCAA Regional
2011	Nebraska	41–14	9–9	6th	NCAA Regional
Nebraska Cornhuskers (Big Ten Conference) (2012–Present)
2012	Nebraska	33–22	14–9	3rd	
2013	Nebraska	45–16	16–6	2nd	Women's College World Series
2014	Nebraska	44–18	18–5	T-1st	NCAA Super Regional
2015	Nebraska	35–23	17–6	3rd	NCAA Regional
2016	Nebraska	35–21	13–9	5th	NCAA Regional
2017	Nebraska	24–29	13–10	5th	
2018	Nebraska	31–23	9–13	9th	
2019	Nebraska	21–31	9–14	T-9th	
2020	Nebraska	9–14			Season canceled due to COVID-19
2021	Nebraska	22–22	22–22	8th	
2022	Nebraska	41–16	17–5	2nd	NCAA Regional
2023	Nebraska	36–22	13–10	4th	NCAA Regional
2024	Nebraska	30–23	12–9	4th	
2025	Nebraska	43–15	17–5	3rd	NCAA Super Regional
2026	Nebraska	52–8	23–1	1st	Women's College World Series
Nebraska:		1,222–688 (.640)	402–257 (.610)		
Total:		1,230–704 (.636)			
National champion Postseason invitational champion Conference regular season champion Conference regular season and conference tournament champion Division regular season champion Division regular season and conference tournament champion Conference tournament champion
