= Devon Park (stadium) =

Fastpitch Softball park in Oklahoma City, Oklahoma, USA

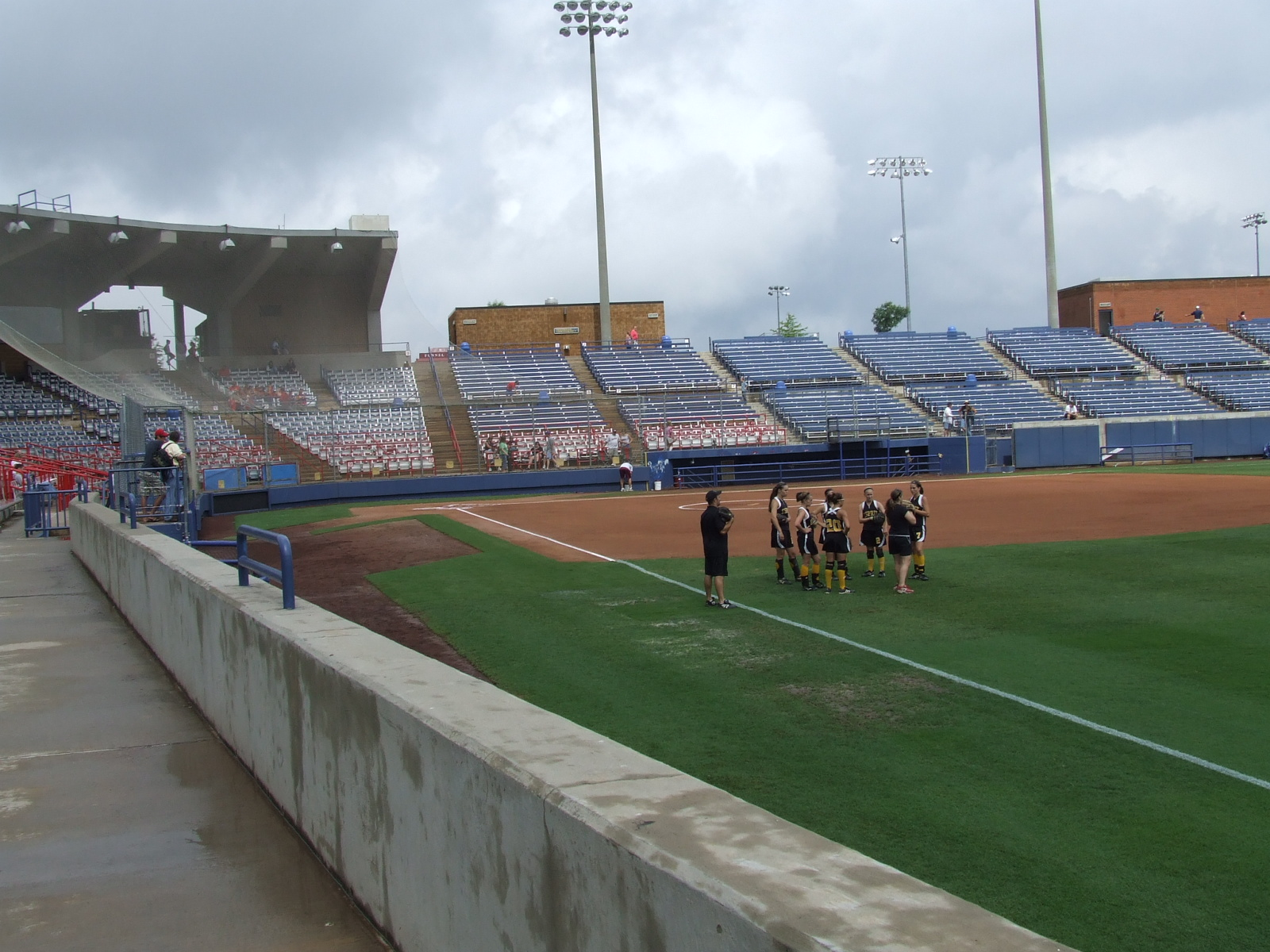
- Interactive map of Devon Park
- Full name: Devon Park
- Location: Oklahoma City, Oklahoma, U.S.
- Coordinates: 35.524796°N 97.463719°W
- Owner: Government of Oklahoma City
- Operator: USA Softball Inc.
- Capacity: 13,000
- Surface: Grass
- Record attendance: 12,324 was set on June 7, 2024

Construction
- Opened: 1987 (39 years ago)
- Renovated: 2003, 2013–2015, 2018, 2020

Tenants
- Women's College World Series (NCAA) (1990–present); Oklahoma City Spark (2023–2024); Big 12 Conference softball tournament (2017–present)

Website
- https://www.usasoftball.com/devon-park/venue-information/

Devon Park, originally known as the Don E. Porter ASA Hall of Fame Stadium from 1987 to 2017 and USA Softball Hall of Fame Stadium, until 2024, is softball-specific ballpark located inside the USA Softball Hall of Fame Complex in Oklahoma City, Oklahoma, United States. It seats 13,000 and is the site of the annual Women's College World Series. From 2023 to 2024, Hall of Fame Stadium was home to the Oklahoma City Spark, the city's professional softball team. The stadium will host softball during the 2028 Summer Olympics.

== History ==
The complex includes 4 fields:

- OGE Energy Field
- Field 4
- Field 2
- Field 3

The complex is owned by the city and operated under a long-term lease by USA Softball with the exception of the office building, which USA Softball owns and uses for its headquarters.

Devon Park originally opened in 1987 as the Don E. Porter ASA Hall of Fame Stadium. It was renamed in 2017 when the Amateur Softball Association rebranded to USA Softball. The stadium underwent extensive renovations from September 2013 to 2015.

Through 2017, it hosted two major college tournaments: the Big 12 Conference championship and the Women's College World Series, as well as the World Cup of Softball, one of the premier international softball events. The Big 12 discontinued its tournament after 2010; however, the Women's College World Series continues to be held there. In 2017, the Big 12 Conference resumed holding a conference tournament in the 2017 season; it has been at this location along with the USA Softball International Cup once major renovations to the facility were completed in 2020. Oklahoma City will host the Women's College World Series through 2035, provided the city makes good on its promise to complete a four-phase renovation.

In late summer and early fall 2018, a new two-story state-of-the-art press box was built, and a new LED jumbotron video scoreboard was also added. Seating capacity (seating bowl and outfield bleachers) was further expanded in time for the 2020 Women's College World Series, which was ultimately not held due to the COVID-19 pandemic. The latest expansion brought the main stadium's capacity to 13,000. The stadium adopted its current name in 2024, when locally based oil and gas firm Devon Energy signed a multi-year sponsorship agreement with USA Softball.

In 2007, it was ranked the number-eight sporting venue in Oklahoma.

=== 2028 Summer Olympics ===
Per Los Angeles City Council approval on March 28, 2025, venues in Oklahoma City will host two events during the 2028 Summer Olympics, which will primarily be held in Los Angeles. The LA Olympic Organizing Committee opted to have canoe slalom and softball in Oklahoma City given the lack of acceptable venues for those sports in Los Angeles and the desire to use existing infrastructure instead of building games-specific venues. Riversport OKC will host the canoe slalom competition, while Devon Park will host the softball competition. Oklahoma City is approximately 1,300 miles (2,090 km) away from Los Angeles.

== Gallery ==
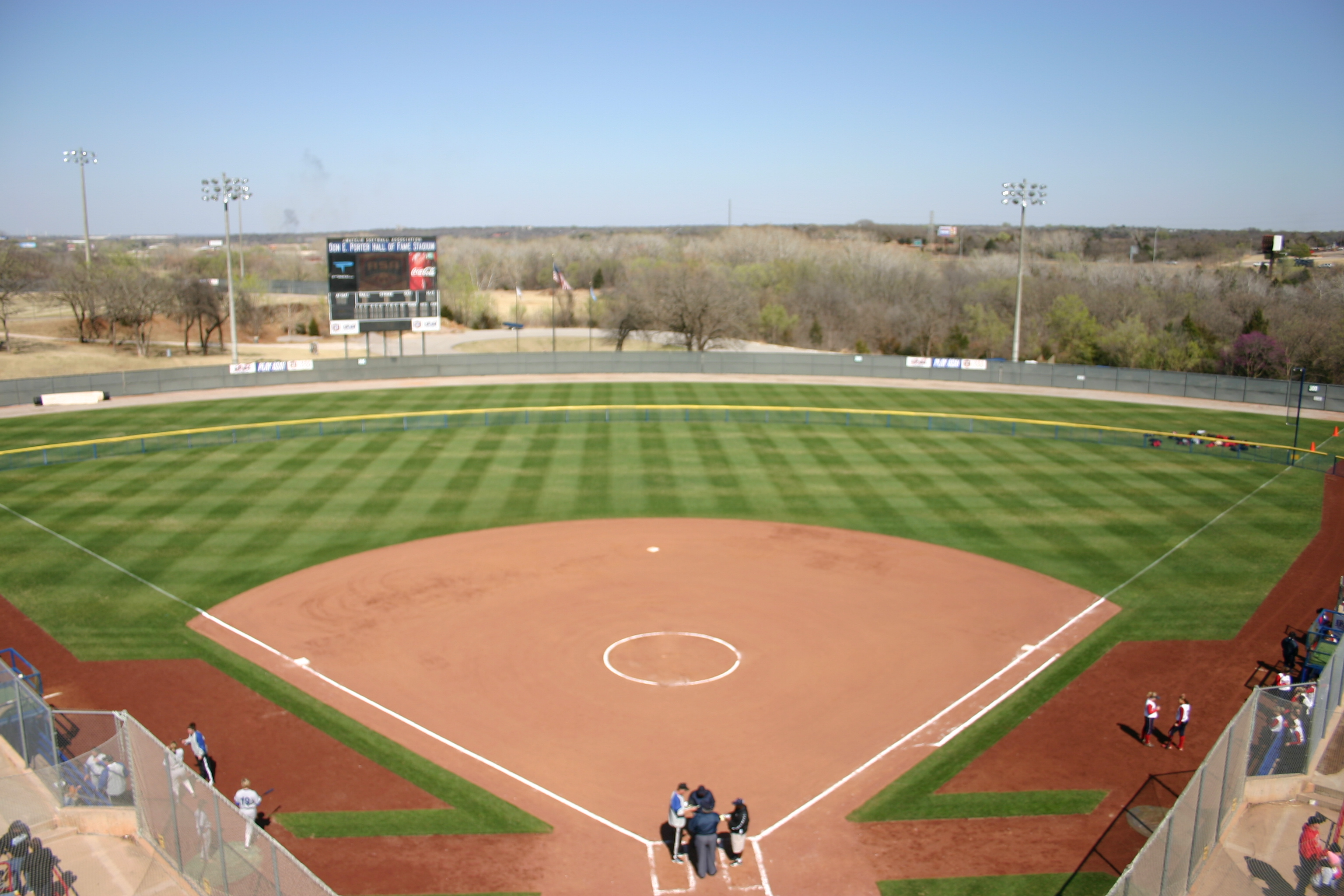
Don E. Porter "ASA Hall of Fame Stadium" in 2006

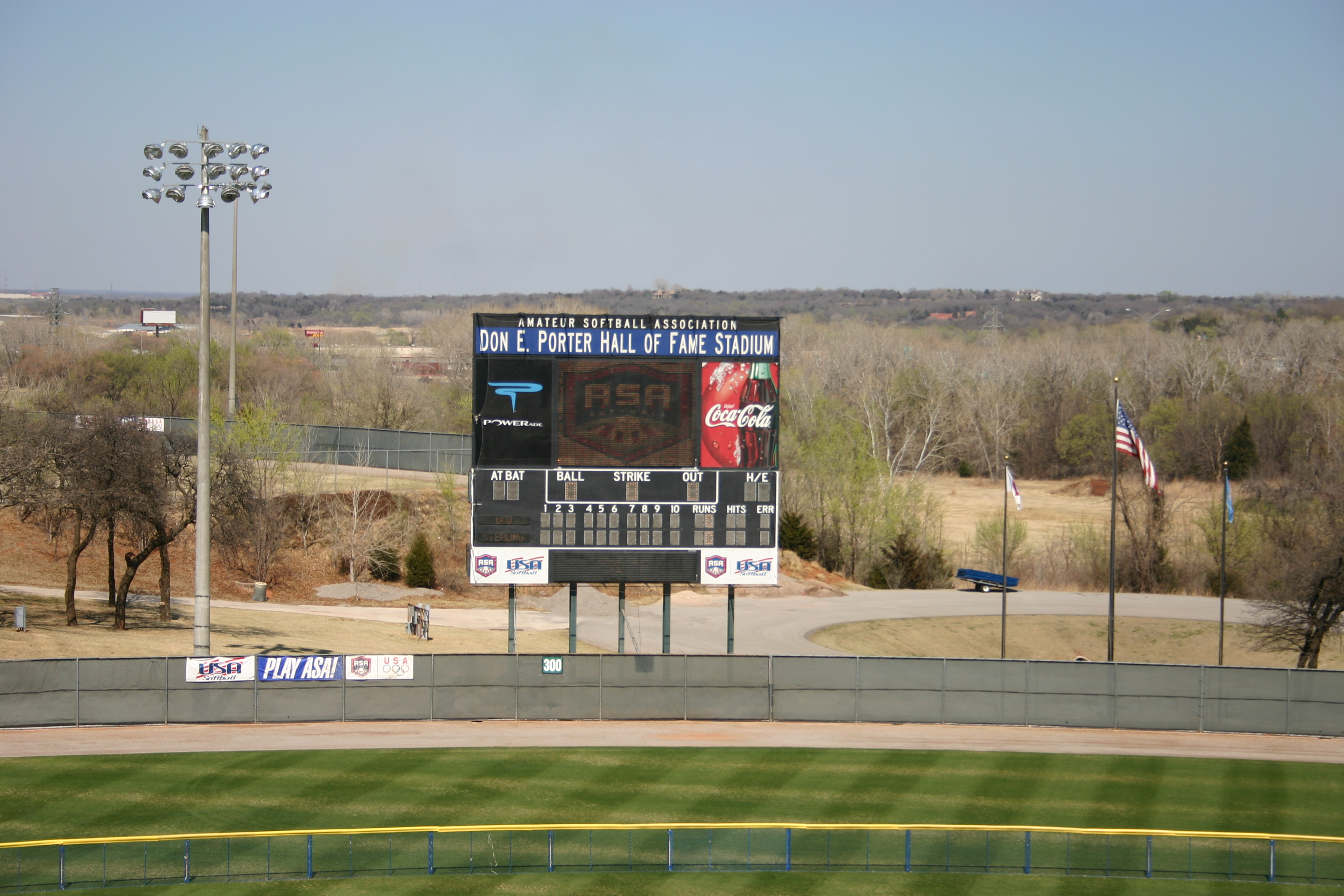
Don E. Porter "ASA Hall of Fame Stadium" in 2006

== See also ==
- Oklahoma City Zoological Park
- The Oklahoma State Firefighters Museum, located across the street
- Remington Park, located next to the stadium to the west
- National Softball Hall of Fame and Museum
