= Kansas Jayhawks softball =

- Founded: 1969 (57 years ago)
- University: University of Kansas
- All-time Record: 1,644-1,070-4 (.606) (Varsity-only record, 1973-present)
- Head coach: Jennifer McFalls (8th season)
- Conference: Big 12
- Location: Lawrence, Kansas, US
- Home stadium: Arrocha Ballpark at Rock Chalk Park (capacity: 1100)
- Nickname: Jayhawks
- Colors: Crimson and blue

NCAA WCWS appearances
- 1992

AIAW WCWS appearances
- 1973, 1974, 1975, 1976, 1977, 1979

NCAA Tournament appearances
- 1983, 1985, 1986, 1992, 1993, 1994, 1997, 1999, 2005, 2006, 2014, 2015, 2026

Conference tournament championships
- 2006

Regular-season conference championships
- Big Eight; 1977, 1979; Big 12

The Kansas Jayhawks softball is the team that represents the University of Kansas in NCAA Division I college softball. The team currently participates in the Big 12 Conference. The Jayhawks are currently led by their head coach Jennifer McFalls. The team plays its home games at Arrocha Ballpark at Rock Chalk Park located on the university's campus.

== History ==
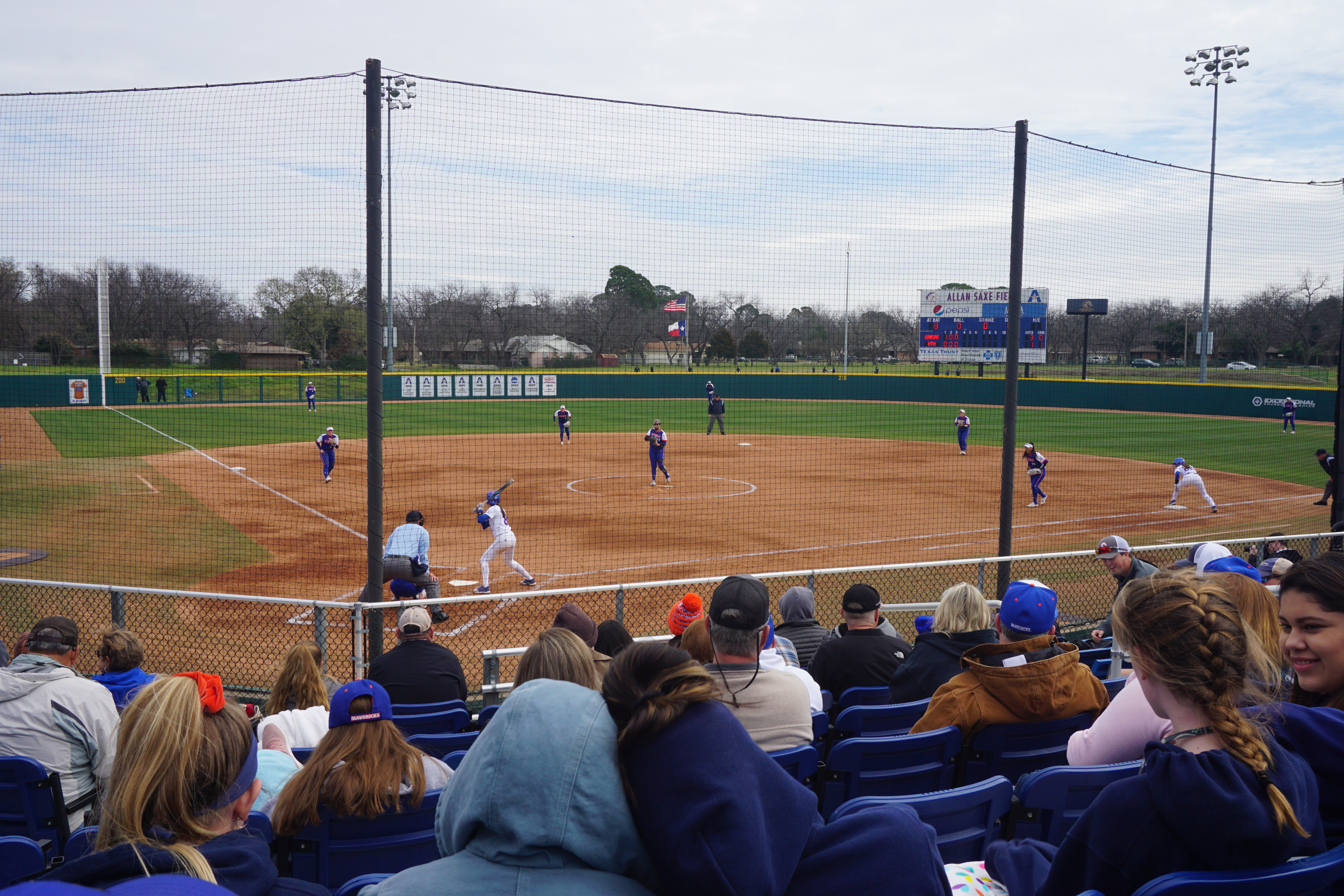
Kansas in action at UT Arlington in 2020

=== Coaching history ===
Years	Coach	Record	%
1969–1970	Marlene Mawson	Statistics not recorded	
1971	Linda Dollar	Statistics not recorded	
1972	Sharon Drysdale	Statistics not recorded	
1973–1976	Sharon Drysdale	45-17	.722
1977–1987	Bob Stanclift	348–160	.685
1988–1995	Kalum Haack	283–158–2	.639
1996	Gayle Luedke	31–26	.544
1997–2009	Tracy Bunge	372–336–2	.525
2010–2018	Megan Smith	393–265	.597
2019–present	Jennifer McFalls	133–170-1	.439

== Championships ==
=== Conference Championships ===
Season	Conference	Record	Head coach
1977	Big Eight Conference		Bob Stanclift
1979	Big Eight Conference		Bob Stanclift

=== Conference Tournament Championships ===
Year	Conference	Tournament Location	Head coach
2006	Big 12 Conference	Oklahoma City, OK	Tracy Bunge

== Coaching staff ==
Name	Position coached	Consecutive season at Kansas in current position
Jennifer McFalls	Head coach	5th
Laura Heberling	Associate head coach	2nd
Kaitlyn Chiles	Assistant coach	1st
Gina Fogue	Volunteer assistant coach	1st
Cacy Williams	Director of operations	1st

== Notable players ==
=== All-Americans ===
- Shelby Gayre - 2020
- Maggie Hull - 2013
- Serena Settlemier - 2006
- Christi Musser - 2002
- Stephani Williams - 1994
- Christi Arterburn - 1992
- Camille Spitaleri - 1992
- Sheila Connolly - 1986
- Kelly Downs - 1986
- Tracy Bunge - 1986
- Becky Ascenio - 1983
- Becky Craft - 1982
- Jill Larson - 1981

=== Conference awards ===
Big 12 Player of the Year

- Serena Settlemier, 2006
- Kassie Humphries, 2003-2007

Big 12 Freshman of the Year

- Kara Pierce, 2001
- Daniella Chavez, 2015
- Ella Boyer, 2026

Big 12 Scholar-Athlete of the Year

- Maggie Hull, 2013
- Alex Jones, 2014
- Maddie Stein, 2015
- Shelby Gayre, 2020

=== Retired Jerseys ===
- No. 11 Sheila Connolly
- No. 10 Camille Spitaleri
- No. 24 Tracy Bunge
