= Texas Tech Red Raiders softball =

Texas Tech Red Raiders
- 2027 Texas Tech Red Raiders softball team
- Founded: 1981 (45 years ago)
- University: Texas Tech University
- Head coach: Gerry Glasco (2nd season)
- Conference: Big 12
- Location: Lubbock, Texas, US
- Home stadium: Tracy Sellers Field (capacity: 1,181)
- Nickname: Red Raiders
- Colors: Scarlet and black

NCAA WCWS runner-up
- 2025, 2026

NCAA WCWS appearances
- 2025, 2026

NCAA super regional appearances
- 2025, 2026

NCAA Tournament appearances
- 1999, 2001, 2010, 2011, 2012, 2019, 2025, 2026

Conference tournament championships
- 2025

Regular-season conference championships
- 2025, 2026

The Texas Tech Red Raiders softball team competes in the NCAA Division I, by representing Texas Tech University as they are a member of the Big 12 Conference. Texas Tech has played their home games at the now Tracy Sellers Field in Lubbock, Texas since the 2026 season.

== History ==
=== Coaching history ===
Years	Coach	Record	%
1981–1982	Cindy Carleton	12–37	.245
1983–1985	Kathy Welter	64–51–3	.555
1986–1995	No Team		
1996–2000	Renee Luers-Gillispie	121–133–1	.476
2000	Carla Marchetti	17–26	.395
2001–2004	Bobby Reeves	94–141	.400
2005–2008	Teresa Wilson	89–123	.420
2009	Amy Suiter	15–42	.263
2010–2014	Shanon Hays	186–96	.660
2015–2020	Adrian Gregory	157–147	.516
2021–2022	Sami Ward	21–26	.447
2023–2024	Craig Snider	60–43	.583
2025–present	Gerry Glasco	115–23	.833

== Coaching staff ==
Name	Position coached	Consecutive season at Texas Tech in current position
Gerry Glasco	Head coach	3rd
Tara Archibald	Associate head coach	3rd
Shelby Pendley	Assistant coach	1st
Jeff Cottrill	Assistant coach	1st

== Notable players ==
=== National awards ===
NFCA National Pitcher of the Year

- NiJaree Canady (2025)

=== Conference awards ===
Big 12 Pitcher of the Year

- NiJaree Canady (2025, 2026)

Big 12 Coach of the Year

- Gerry Glasco (2025, 2026)

== See also ==
- List of NCAA Division I softball programs
