= Iowa State Cyclones softball =

- University: Iowa State University
- Head coach: Jamie Pinkerton (9th season)
- Conference: Big-12
- Location: Ames, Iowa, US
- Home stadium: Cyclone Sports Complex (capacity: 1,500)
- Nickname: Cyclones
- Colors: Cardinal and gold

AIAW WCWS appearances
- 1971, 1973

NCAA Tournament appearances
- 1988, 2021

Conference tournament championships
- 1976, 1978

The Iowa State Cyclones softball team represents Iowa State University (ISU) and competes in the Big 12 Conference of NCAA Division I. The team is coached by Jamie Pinkerton, he is in his 9th year at Iowa State. The Cyclones play their home games at the Cyclone Sports Complex on Iowa State's campus.

== History ==
The Cyclones had put together a women's softball team by 1971 and appeared in two of the early AIAW Women's College World Series in 1971 and 1973. In 1971 the Cyclones advanced to the championship final series against John F. Kennedy College, before bowing out with two losses, 6-0 and 4-0. In 1974, under coach Gloria Crosby, the team got off to a strong start, winning two Big Eight Championships in four years.

Iowa State continued their strong start into the 1980s under Head Coach Deb Kuhn. In 1987 the Cyclones made their first ever appearance in the Top 20 culminating in Coach Kuhn being named Big Eight Coach of the Year. The following year Iowa State made their first run in program history in the NCAA Tournament.

The transition from the Big Eight to the Big 12 has proved difficult for the Cyclones. The team has not won more than six conference games in any season since joining the conference. The most wins overall in a single season since the start of the Big 12 is 29.

Jamie Trachsel was the coach of the Cyclones for the 2017 season. She led them to a 23-35 overall record and their best conference standing since 1994. At the conclusion of the season she left the Cyclones to coach the Minnesota Gophers.

The team is currently coached by Jamie Pinkerton, he is in his 5th year at Iowa State.

== Record ==
Record
Big Eight (1973–1996)
Year	Head Coach	Overall Record	Conference Record	Conference Standing	Postseason
1971		?	–	–	WCWS (2nd)
1972		?	–	–	–
1973		?	–	–	WCWS
1974	Gloria Crosby	9-7	–	–	–
1975	Gloria Crosby	18-4	–	–	–
1976	Mike Anthony	17-8	–	1st	–
1977	Mike Anthony	22-10	–	2nd	–
1978	Lucille Gecewicz	22-9	–	1st	–
1979	Lucille Gecewicz	27-8	–	3rd	–
1980	Lucille Gecewicz	23-19	–	T-5th	–
1981	Lucille Gecewicz	38-24	–	4th	–
1982	Kelly Phipps	37-29-1	–	5th	–
1983	Deb Kuhn	15–27	–	6th	–
1984	Deb Kuhn	17-19-1	2–6	3rd	–
1985	Deb Kuhn	34-19	6-6	3rd	–
1986	Deb Kuhn	26-18	4–8	6th	–
1987	Deb Kuhn	32-18	7-3	2nd	–
1988	Deb Kuhn	35-25	5-5	3rd	NCAA Regional
1989	Deb Kuhn	33-17-1	4–6	5th	–
1990	Deb Kuhn	13–29	1–8	6th	–
1991	Deb Kuhn	20–27	3-3	4th	–
1992	Deb Kuhn	12–29	1–7	6th	–
1993	Deb Kuhn	15–31	8–10	4th	–
1994	Deb Kuhn	18-31-1	7–13	5th	–
1995	Deb Kuhn	22-21-1	3–13	6th	–
1996	Deb Kuhn	17–28	6–13	7th	–
Big 12 (1996–Present)
Year	Head Coach	Overall Record	Conference Record	Conference Standing	Postseason
1997	Ruth Crowe	17–24	1–13	10th	–
1998	Ruth Crowe	16–27	5–11	8th	–
1999	Ruth Crowe	23–30	5–11	T-9th	–
2000	Ruth Crowe	18–29	4–14	10th	–
2001	Ruth Crowe	14–27	2–12	10th	–
2002	Ruth Crowe	19–25	6–12	8th	–
2003	Ruth Crowe	19–28	6–12	7th	–
2004	Ruth Crowe	13–31	3–13	9th	–
2005	Ruth Crowe	18–32	3–15	T-9th	–
2006	Stacy Gemeinhardt-Cesler	23–28	5–13	T-8th	–
2007	Stacy Gemeinhardt-Cesler	24–40	3–15	T-9th	–
2008	Stacy Gemeinhardt-Cesler	29-29	4–14	T-9th	–
2009	Stacy Gemeinhardt-Cesler	26–29	7–11	8th	–
2010	Stacy Gemeinhardt-Cesler	26–29	4–14	9th	–
2011	Stacy Gemeinhardt-Cesler	21–28	3–15	8th	–
2012	Stacy Gemeinhardt-Cesler	14–39	2–22	8th	–
2013	Stacy Gemeinhardt-Cesler	21–34	4–14	6th	–
2014	Stacy Gemeinhardt-Cesler	23–31–1	2–16	7th	–
2015	Stacy Gemeinhardt-Cesler	26–28	3–15	T-6th	–
2016	Stacy Gemeinhardt-Cesler	20–35	1–17	7th	–
2017	Jamie Trachsel	23–35	6–12	5th	–
2018	Jamie Pinkerton	23–33	4–14	6th	–
2019	Jamie Pinkerton	37–25	7–11	5th	–
2020	Jamie Pinkerton	11–13	0–0	–	–
2021	Jamie Pinkerton	34–23	6–12	5th	NCAA Regional
2022	Jamie Pinkerton	28–27	6-12	4th	–
2023	Jamie Pinkerton	25–30	6-12	5th	–
2024	Jamie Pinkerton	20–31	6-18	9th	–
2025	Jamie Pinkerton	22–18	10-6	–	–
Total	–	1,142-1,722	180–477	–	–

== Individual accomplishments ==
=== Olympians ===
Cyclones in the Olympics
Year	Name	Country
2000 Sydney	Erin Woods	Canada
2004 Athens	Erin Woods; Kristen Karanzias	Canada; Greece

=== All-Americans ===
All-Americans
Year	Player	Team
1989	Jenny Condon	Second Team
2021	Sami Williams	First Team

== Facilities ==
The Cyclones play their home games at the $13 million Cyclone Sports Complex that opened in 2012. Some of the state-of-the-art facility's amenities are home and away locker rooms, officials' locker rooms, team meeting rooms, athletic training room, and a seating capacity of 1,500.
