= Texas A&M Aggies softball =

Texas A&M Aggies
- 2026 Texas A&M Aggies softball team
- Founded: 1972 (53 years ago)
- University: Texas A&M University
- Head coach: Trisha Ford (2nd season)
- Conference: SEC
- Location: College Station, Texas, US
- Home stadium: Davis Diamond (capacity: 2,000)
- Nickname: Aggies
- Colors: Maroon and white

NCAA Tournament champions
- 1983, 1987

AIAW Tournament champions
- 1982

NCAA WCWS runner-up
- 1984, 1986, 2008

NCAA WCWS appearances
- 1983, 1984, 1986, 1987, 1988, 2007, 2008, 2017

AIAW WCWS appearances
- 1979, 1980, 1981, 1982

NCAA super regional appearances
- 2005, 2007, 2008, 2011, 2013, 2017, 2018, 2024

NCAA Tournament appearances
- 1983, 1984, 1985, 1986, 1987, 1988, 1990, 1991, 1994, 1996, 1999, 2000, 2002, 2003, 2004, 2005, 2006, 2007, 2008, 2009, 2010, 2011, 2012, 2013, 2014, 2015, 2016, 2017, 2018, 2019, 2021, 2022, 2023, 2024, 2025, 2026

Conference tournament championships
- 2008, 2025

Regular-season conference championships
- 2005, 2008

The Texas A&M Aggies softball team represents Texas A&M University in NCAA Division I college softball. The team belongs to the SEC Conference and plays home games at the Davis Diamond. The Aggies have won two NCAA championships in 1983 and 1987 along with an AIAW national championship in 1982. The Aggies have been NCAA runners-up three times in 1984, 1986, and 2008. Reaching the Women's College World Series eleven times, the Aggies have reached the finals six times in 1982, 1983, 1984, 1986, 1987, and 2008.

== Head coaches ==
The following people have served as head coaches at Texas A&M.

Name	Years	Record	Pct.
Mildred Little*	1973	N/A	N/A
Toby Crown*	1974	N/A	N/A
Kay Don*	1975–76	15–14	.517
Diane Quitta	1977	31–9	.775
Diane Justice/Don Smith	1978	33–20	.623
Bill Galloway	1979–81	208–48	.813
Bob Brock	1982–1996	688–255	.730
Jo Evans	1997–2022	987–503–2	.662
Trisha Ford	2023–present	127–47	.730

Records are current as of September 13, 2025.

*No Record statistics are available for Texas A&M until the 1975–76 season

== Year-by-year results ==
Season	Coach	Record	Notes
1973	Mildred Little	Records Unavailable	
1974	Toby Crown	Records Unavailable	
1975	Kay Don	Records Unavailable	
1976	Kay Don	15–14	
1977	Diane Quitta	31–9	
1978	Diane Justice/Don Smith	33–20	
1979	Bill Galloway	58–20	AIAW Women's College World Series
1980	Bill Galloway	72–16	AIAW Women's College World Series
1981	Bill Galloway	78–12	AIAW Women's College World Series
1982	Bob Brock	84–9	AIAW Women's College World Series Champions
1983	Bob Brock	41–11	Women's College World Series Champions
1984	Bob Brock	51–18	Women's College World Series (Runner-up)
1985	Bob Brock	45–12	NCAA Regional
1986	Bob Brock	41–13	Women's College World Series (Runner-up)
1987	Bob Brock	56–8	Women's College World Series Champions
1988	Bob Brock	43–21	Women's College World Series
1989	Bob Brock	31–27	
1990	Bob Brock	47–20	NCAA Regional
1991	Bob Brock	46–15	NCAA Regional
1992	Bob Brock	41–19	
1993	Bob Brock	38–14	
1994	Bob Brock	56–20	NCAA Regional
1995	Bob Brock	29–27	
1996	Bob Brock	39–21	NCAA Regional
1997	Jo Evans	37–29	
1998	Jo Evans	32–25–2	
1999	Jo Evans	41–22	NCAA Regional
2000	Jo Evans	32–23	NCAA Regional
2001	Jo Evans	32–19	
2002	Jo Evans	40–18	NCAA Regional
2003	Jo Evans	38–22	NCAA Regional
2004	Jo Evans	33–22	NCAA Regional
2005	Jo Evans	47–10	Big 12 Champions, NCAA Super Regional
2006	Jo Evans	34–19	NCAA Regional
2007	Jo Evans	46–14	Women's College World Series
2008	Jo Evans	57–10	Big 12 Champions, Big 12 Tournament Champions, Women's College World Series (Runner-up)
2009	Jo Evans	33–22	NCAA Regional
2010	Jo Evans	44–16	NCAA Regional
2011	Jo Evans	44–15	NCAA Super Regional
2012	Jo Evans	41–18	NCAA Regional
2013	Jo Evans	42–18	NCAA Super Regional
2014	Jo Evans	37–22	NCAA Regional
2015	Jo Evans	40–20	NCAA Regional
2016	Jo Evans	39–20	NCAA Regional
2017	Jo Evans	47–13	Women's College World Series
2018	Jo Evans	44–18	NCAA Super Regional
2019	Jo Evans	28–27	NCAA Regional
2020	Jo Evans	17–9	Season canceled due to COVID-19 pandemic
2021	Jo Evans	32–23	NCAA Regional
2022	Jo Evans	31–28	NCAA Regional
2023	Trisha Ford	35–21	NCAA Regional
2024	Trisha Ford	44–15	NCAA Super Regional
2025	Trisha Ford	48–11	NCAA Regional
2026	Trisha Ford	38–19	NCAA Regional

=== NCAA tournament seeding history ===
National seeding began in 2005. The Texas A&M Aggies have been a national seed in 12 of the 21 tournaments.

Years →	'05	'06	'07	'08	'11	'12	'13	'17	'18	'24	'25	'26
Seeds →	5	13	4	5	16	8	16	9	15	16	1	15

== Notable players ==
=== National awards ===
NFCA Golden Shoe Award

- Sharonda McDonald - 2005

Honda Sports Award

- Lori Stoll - 1983

=== Conference awards ===
Big 12 Player of the Year

- Kendall Richards (1996)
- Selena Collins (2002)
- Amanda Scarborough (2005)
- Megan Gibson (2008)

Big 12 Pitcher of the Year

- Jessica Kapchinski (2004)
- Amanda Scarborough (2007)

Big 12 Freshman of the Year

- Sharonda McDonald (2004)
- Amanda Scarborough (2005)

Big 12 Defensive Player of the Year

- Natalie Villarreal (2009, 2011)

Big 12 Coach of the Year

- Jo Evans (2004, 2005, 2008)

=== All-Americans ===
The Texas A&M Softball program has had 29 different players selected to an all-American team for a total of 46 times. A&M has had 1 four time all–American in Lori Stoll, 4 3–time all-Americans (Andaya, Cooper, Gibson, & Dumezich), as well as an additional 6 2–time all-Americans (Carter, Mizera, Scarborough, Vidales, Lee, & Perez).

Player	Year(s)	Team
Lori Stoll	1980–83	1st
Karen Guerrero	1982	1st
Shawn Andaya	1984–85, '87	2nd, 1st
Josie Carter	1984–85	1st
Cindy Cooper	1984–86	2nd, 1st
Gay McNutt	1985	1st
Judy Trussell	1985	1st
Liz Mizera	1987–88	1st
Julie Smith	1987	1st
Missi Young	1991	2nd
Jennifer McFalls	1993	1st
Erin Field	1996	3rd
Kendall Richards	1996	1st
Selena Collins	2002	3rd
Jessica Kapchinski	2004	3rd
Amanda Scarborough	2005, '07	1st
Megan Gibson	2005, '07–08	2nd, 1st
Jamie Hinshaw	2008	3rd
Meagan May	2010	2nd
Mel Dumezich	2011–2013	2nd, 3rd
Cali Lanphear	2013	2nd
Cassie Tysarczyk	2014	3rd
Tori Vidales	2016, '18	3rd, 2nd
Riley Sartain	2017	3rd
Haley Lee	2021–22	3rd, 2nd
Julia Cottrill	2023	3rd
Emiley Kennedy	2024	2nd
Mac Barbara	2025	2nd
Mya Perez	2025-26	2nd, 1st

== Notable Individual School Records ==
=== Career Records ===
- Most Games Played: Mya Truelove (1994–97) – 254
- Highest Batting Average (min 250 at–bats): Kendall Richards (1995–96) – 0.422
- Most Home Runs: Meagan May (2010–13) – 69
- Most Hits: Jennifer McFalls (1991–94) – 279
- Most Stolen Bases: Sharonda McDonald (2004–07) – 153
- Most Pitching Wins: Lori Stoll (1980–83) – 145
- Most Strikeouts: Lori Stoll (1980–83) – 1,357
- Lowest ERA: Lori Stoll (1980–83) – 0.34

=== Single–Season Records ===
- Most At-Bats: Josie Carter (1982) – 294
- Most RBI's: Josie Carter (1982) – 72
- Most Home Runs: Haley Lee (2021) – 25
- Most Hits: Josie Carter (1982) – 97
- Highest Batting Average: Kendall Richards (1996) – .454
- Most Stolen Bases: Keeli Miligan (2016) – 54
- Most Pitching Wins: Lori Stoll (1981) – 46
- Most Strikeouts: Shawn Andaya (1984) – 395
- Lowest ERA: Shawn Andaya (1985) – 0.26

=== Coaching Records ===
- Most Games Coached: Jo Evans (1997–2022) – 1492
- Most Games Won: Jo Evans (1997–2022) - 987
- Highest Winning Percentage: Bill Galloway (1979–81) – .813
- Most National Championships Won: Bob Brock (1982–96) – 3

== See also ==
- List of NCAA Division I softball programs
