= Baylor Bears softball =

Baylor Bears
- Founded: 1979 (46 years ago)
- University: Baylor University
- Head coach: Glenn Moore (24th season)
- Conference: Big 12
- Location: Waco, Texas, US
- Home stadium: Getterman Stadium (capacity: 1,230)
- Nickname: Bears
- Colors: Green and gold

NCAA WCWS appearances
- 2007, 2011, 2014, 2017

AIAW WCWS appearances
- 1980, 1981

NCAA super regional appearances
- 2005, 2007, 2009, 2011, 2014, 2017, 2024

NCAA Tournament appearances
- 2004, 2005, 2006, 2007, 2009, 2011, 2012, 2013, 2014, 2015, 2016, 2017, 2018, 2021, 2023, 2024, 2026

Regular-season conference championships
- 2007

The Baylor Bears softball team represents Baylor University in NCAA Division I softball. They play their home games at Getterman Stadium in Waco, Texas. The team's current head coach is Glenn Moore, a position he's held since the 2000 season.

== Championships ==
=== Conference Championships ===
Season	Conference	Record	Head Coach
2007	Big 12 Conference	14-3	Glenn Moore

== Coaching staff ==
Name	Position coached	Consecutive season at Baylor in current position
Glenn Moore	Head coach	24th
Britni Newman	Assoc. Head Coach	20th
Asst. Coach	3rd	
Meagan Weldon-Diaz	Volunteer Assistant Coach	2nd
Dani Price	Director of Operations	2nd

== Notable players ==
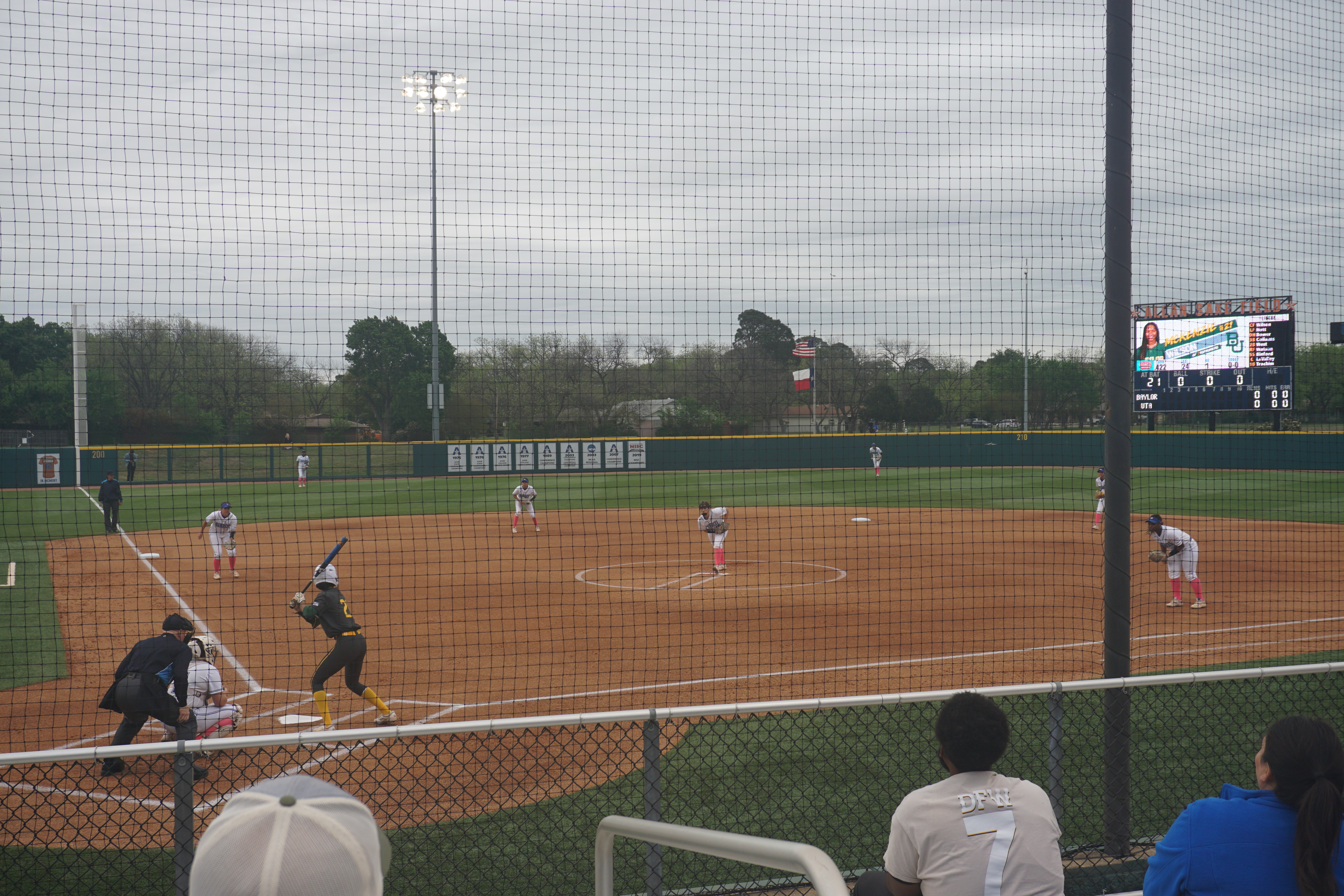
Baylor in action at UT Arlington in 2022

=== Conference awards ===
Big 12 Pitcher of the Year

- Whitney Canion (2009)
- Whitney Canion (2014)

Big 12 Freshman of the Year

- Brette Reagan (2006)
- Kirsten Shortridge (2007)
- Whitney Canion (2009)
- Sarah Smith (2013)

Big 12 Defensive Player of the Year

- Jessie Scroggins (2017)
- Presleigh Pilon (2025)
