= 2004 NCAA Division I softball rankings =

2004 NCAA Division I softball season
- Defending Champions: UCLA

Tournament

Women's College World Series
- Champions: UCLA (11th (13th overall) title)
- Runners-up: California (9th WCWS Appearance)
- Winning Coach: Sue Enquist (7th title)
- WCWS MOP: Kristin Schmidt (LSU)

Seasons
- ← 2003 2005 →

The following human polls make up the 2004 NCAA Division I women's softball rankings. The NFCA/USA Today Poll is voted on by a panel of 32 Division I softball coaches and ranks to top 25 teams nationally.

== Legend ==
	Increase in ranking
	Decrease in ranking
	Not ranked previous week
Italics	Number of first place votes
(#–#)	Win-loss record
т	Tied with team above or below also with this symbol

== NFCA/USA Today ==
	Week 0 Pre	Week 1	Week 2	Week 3	Week 4 Mar 7	Week 5	Week 6	Week 7	Week 8	Week 9	Week 10	Week 11	Week 12	Week 13	Week Final Final	
1.	UCLA (26)	UCLA (24)	UCLA (21)	UCLA	UCLA (22) (21–0)	Arizona (19)	Arizona (20)	Arizona (25)	Arizona (24)	Arizona (23)	Arizona (20)	Arizona (19)	Arizona (24)	Arizona (19)	UCLA (25) (46–9)	1.
2.	Arizona	Arizona	Arizona (2)	Arizona	Arizona (1) (25–0)	UCLA (1)	UCLA (5)	UCLA	UCLA	Florida State	Florida State	Florida State	Florida State	California	California (53–13)	2.
3.	California (1)	California (1)	California (1)	LSU	California (22–2)	California	California	California	Florida State	UCLA	UCLA	UCLA	UCLA	LSU	LSU (57–12)	3.
4.	Oklahoma	Oklahoma	Washington	California	LSU (22–4)	Florida State	Florida State	Florida State	California	California	California	California	California	Florida State	Stanford (49–19)	4.
5.	Washington	Washington	Oklahoma	Oklahoma	Florida State (21–3)	LSU	Georgia	Georgia	Georgia	Washington	Washington	LSU	LSU	UCLA	Florida State (62–12)	5.
6.	Alabama	Georgia	Georgia	Florida State	Oklahoma (18–5–1)	Alabama	Washington	LSU	LSU	LSU	LSU	Michigan	Washington	Michigan	Oklahoma (45–22–1)	6.
7.	Georgia	Alabama	Michigan	Washington	Georgia (17–4)	Oklahoma	Alabama	Washington	Washington	Georgia	Louisiana–Lafayette	Washington	Stanford	Washington	Washington (40–19)	7.
8.	Nebraska	Stanford	Stanford	Georgia	Washington (13–5)	Georgia	LSU	Louisiana–Lafayette	Louisiana–Lafayette	Louisiana–Lafayette	Michigan	Georgia	Michigan	Stanford	Arizona (55–6)	8.
9.	Louisiana–Lafayettte	Michigan	Alabama	Alabama	Alabama (19–3)	Washington	Oklahoma	Michigan	Michigan	Michigan	Georgia	Stanford	Louisiana–Lafayette	Louisiana–Lafayette	Michigan (54–13)	9.
10.	Michigan т	Louisiana–Lafayette	Louisiana–Lafayette	Stanford	Louisiana–Lafayette (25–2)	Louisiana–Lafayette	Louisiana–Lafayette	Alabama	Alabama	Stanford	Stanford	Louisiana–Lafayette	Georgia	Georgia	Louisiana–Lafayette (60–8)	10.
11.	Texas т	Florida State	Florida State	Michigan	Stanford (18–5) т	Stanford	Michigan	Stanford	Stanford	Tennessee	Tennessee	Oregon	Tennessee	Tennessee	Georgia (55–17)	11.
12.	DePaul	Nebraska	LSU	Louisiana–Lafayette	Michigan (12–5) т	Michigan	Tennessee	Tennessee	Tennessee	Fresno State	Fresno State	Tennessee	Oregon	Auburn	Oregon (42–21)	12.
13.	Cal State Fullerton	LSU	Tennessee	Tennessee	Tennessee (19–5)	Pacific	Stanford	Oklahoma	Fresno State	Alabama	Oregon	Nebraska	Nebraska	Oregon	Alabama (45–20)	13.
14.	LSU	Texas	Nebraska	Oregon	Oregon (17–5)	Tennessee	Fresno State	Fresno State	Oregon	Oregon	Alabama	Fresno State	Fresno State	Nebraska	Nebraska (45–17)	14.
15.	Stanford	Texas A&M	Texas	South Carolina	Fresno State (13–5)	Fresno State	South Carolina	Oregon	Oregon State	Oregon State	Nebraska	Auburn	AUburn	Alabama	Oregon State (44–28)	15.
16.	Oregon	Fresno State	Fresno State	Fresno State	South Carolina (13–3)	Oregon	Oregon State	Oregon State	Florida	Florida	Oregon State	Alabama	Alabama	Fresno State	South Florida (60–14)	16.
17.	Iowa	Cal State Fullerton	Oregon	Nebraska	Pacific (15–3)	South Carolina	Oregon	Florida	Oklahoma	Oklahoma	South Florida	South Florida	South Florida	South Florida	Illinois (45–21–1)	17.
18.	Texas A&M	Iowa	Arizona State	Pacific	South Florida (22–5)	Oregon State	Pacific	South Florida	South Florida	Nebraska	Florida	Oregon State	Long Beach State	Long Beach State	Tennessee (55–16)	18.
19.	Florida State	Tennessee	Iowa	Texas	Nebraska (11–8)	Florida	Florida	Baylor	Nebraska	South Florida	Auburn	Long Beach State	Oregon State	Baylor	Baylor (48–17) т	19.
20.	Arizona State	Oregon	South Carolina	Arizona State	Arizona State (23–9)	Nebraska	South Florida	Pacific	Baylor	Baylor	Long Beach State	Oklahoma	Baylor	Oregon State	Long Beach State (51–13) т	20.
21.	Oklahoma State	DePaul	Pacific	Iowa	Florida (19–3) т	South Florida	Baylor	Nebraska	Pacific	Long Beach State	Oklahoma	Baylor	Oklahoma	Oklahoma	Hofstra (38–20)	21.
22.	South Carolina	Arizona State	South Florida	South Florida	Texas (13–9) т	Baylor	Nebraska	Auburn	Long Beach State	Auburn	Baylor	Florida	Notre Dame	Texas A&M	Georgia Tech (47–19)	22.
23.	Fresno State	South Carolina	Texas A&M	Florida	Oregon State (19–7)	Arizona State	Arizona State	South Carolina	Auburn	Pacific	Pacific	Texas A&M	Texas A&M	Florida	Auburn (42–18)	23.
24.	Southern Illinois	Oregon State	Cal State Fullerton	Georgia Tech	Georgia Tech (19–5)	Texas	Georgia Tech	Arizona State	Texas State	Texas State	Texas A&M	Pacific	Florida	Notre Dame	Southern Illinois (45–17)	24.
25.	Michigan State	Texas State	Oregon State	Oregon State	Northwestern (12–4)	Georgia Tech	Northwestern	Georgia Tech	South Carolina	South Carolina	Florida Atlantic	Notre Dame	Georgia Tech	Tulsa	Fresno State (48–20)	25.
	Week 0 Pre	Week 1	Week 2	Week 3	Week 4 Mar 7	Week 5	Week 6	Week 7	Week 8	Week 9	Week 10	Week 11	Week 12	Week 13	Week Final Final	
		Dropped: 21. Oklahoma State; 24. Southern Illinois; 25. Michigan State	Dropped: 21. DePaul; 25. Texas State	Dropped: 23. Texas A&M; 24. Cal State Fullerton	Dropped: 21. Iowa	Dropped: 25. Northwestern	Dropped: 24. Texas	Dropped: 25. Northwestern	Dropped: 24. Arizona State; 25. Georgia Tech	None	Dropped: 24. Texas State; 25. South Carolina	Dropped: 25. Florida Atlantic	Dropped: 24. Pacific	Dropped: 25. Georgia Tech	Dropped: 22. Texas A&M; 23. Florida; 24. Notre Dame; 25. Tulsa	
