= Jacquie Joseph =

American softball coach

Current position
- Record: 888–944–1 (.485)

Biographical details
- Born: Flint, Michigan, U.S.
- Education: Central Michigan

Playing career
- 1982–1985: Central Michigan

Coaching career (HC unless noted)
- 1986–87: Central Michigan (asst.)
- 1988: Indiana (asst.)
- 1989–1993: Bowling Green
- 1994–2022: Michigan State

Head coaching record
- Overall: 864–916–1 (.485)

Accomplishments and honors

Championships
- Big Ten tournament (2004); MAC Regular Season (1993)

Awards
- National Fastpitch Coaches Association Hall of Fame (2016); Big Ten Coach of the Year (2003); Great Lakes Regional Coaching Staff of the Year (2002); MAC Coach of the Year (1993); Carman-Ainsworth High School Hall of Fame (2002)

Jacquie Joseph is an American former collegiate softball player and coach who last served as the head coach at Michigan State. Joseph played college softball at Central Michigan from 1982 to 1985.

== Early life and education ==
Joseph attended school at Central Michigan and played softball for the school from 1982 to 1985. She graduated from Central Michigan in 1985 with a degree in business administration. She went back to Central Michigan and earned her master's degree in business in 1987.

== Coaching career ==
=== Bowling Green ===
Joseph was hired in 1989 as Bowling Green's head softball coach. She won 37 games in the 1992 season at Bowling Green, the most in program history.

=== Michigan State ===
Joseph was hired by Michigan State in 1994 as head coach of the softball program. In 2016, Joseph was inducted into the National Fastpitch Coaches Association Hall of Fame as a contributor.

== Personal life ==
Jacquie Joseph resides in Holt, Michigan and has one daughter named Emma.

== Head coaching record ==
=== College ===
Record table
Season	Team	Overall	Conference	Standing	Postseason
Bowling Green (Mid-American Conference) (1989–1993)
1989	Bowling Green	21–35	12–18	6th	
1990	Bowling Green	19–32	10–17	7th	
1991	Bowling Green	25–32	11–17	7th	
1992	Bowling Green	37–16	19–10	2nd	
1993	Bowling Green	34–18	26–9	1st	NCAA Regional
Bowling Green:		136–133 (.506)	78–71 (.523)		
Michigan State Spartans (Big Ten Conference) (1994–2022)
1994	Michigan State	19–38	6–22	T-6th	
1995	Michigan State	24–29	9–19	8th	
1996	Michigan State	37–19	14–10	5th	
1997	Michigan State	47–22	14–9	3rd	NCAA Regional
1998	Michigan State	34–20	11–13	5th	
1999	Michigan State	41–23	13–9	4th	NCAA Regional
2000	Michigan State	30–23	5–10	7th	
2001	Michigan State	21–39	5–15	10th	
2002	Michigan State	24–35	4–15	9th	
2003	Michigan State	40–19	13–6	3rd	NCAA Regionals
2004	Michigan State	36–26	8–12	7th	NCAA Regionals
2005	Michigan State	25–28–1	7–9	8th	
2006	Michigan State	34–25	9–11	7th	
2007	Michigan State	33–26	7–9	7th	
2008	Michigan State	27–29	8–12	T-6th	
2009	Michigan State	21–28	5–14	9th	
2010	Michigan State	21–31	5–15	9th	
2011	Michigan State	27–27	6–14	9th	
2012	Michigan State	11–42	0–27	12th	
2013	Michigan State	24–25	9–10	7th	
2014	Michigan State	12–37	4–19	12th	
2015	Michigan State	19–36	4–19	14th	
2016	Michigan State	27–28	8–15	10th	
2017	Michigan State	34–24	11–12	7th	
2018	Michigan State	24–28	10–12	8th	
2019	Michigan State	16–34	4–18	13th	
2020	Michigan State	6–16	–	–	Season cancelled due to the COVID-19 pandemic
2021	Michigan State	14–26	14–26	12th	
2022	Michigan State	24–28	4–16	12th	
Michigan State:		752–811–1 (.481)	214–398 (.350)		
Total:		888–944–1 (.485)			
National champion Postseason invitational champion Conference regular season champion Conference regular season and conference tournament champion Division regular season champion Division regular season and conference tournament champion Conference tournament champion
