= Connie Clark =

American softball coach

Connie Sue Clark
Biographical details
- Born: December 20, 1965 (age 60); Glendale, Arizona, U.S.

Playing career
- 1984–1985: Central Arizona JC
- 1986–1987: Cal State Fullerton
- Position: Pitcher

Coaching career (HC unless noted)
- 1990–1995: Florida State (asst.)
- 1997–2018: Texas

Head coaching record
- Overall: 873–401–3 (.685)
- Tournaments: NCAA: 52–39 (.571)

Accomplishments and honors

Championships
- 4× Big 12 regular season (2002, 2003, 2006, 2010); 4× Big 12 Tournament (1999, 2002, 2003, 2005)

Awards
- Honda Sports Award (1987); NFCA Division I Coaching Staff of the Year (2003); NFCA Midwest Region Coaching Staff of the Year (2006); 3× Big 12 Coach of the Year (2002, 2006, 2010)

Connie Sue Clark (born December 20, 1965) is an American, former college softball pitcher and head coach. Clark began her softball career at the junior college level before finishing her last two years with the Cal State Fullerton Titans from 1986–87 and leading them to the 1986 Women's College World Series championship title. She is the Big West Conference career leader in ERA and WHIP for her two seasons, she also ranks top-10 for those records for both the Titans and the NCAA Division I.

Clark was named the inaugural head coach of the Texas Longhorns softball program, a position she held from 1997 to 2018. Along the way she was mentor to athletes Christa Williams, Cat Osterman and Blaire Luna and coached teams to a first No. 1 softball ranking, five college World Series and three national semifinal finishes. Clark was also a head coach for the Netherlands.

== Early life and education ==
Clark was born and raised in Glendale, Arizona and graduated from Greenway High School in nearby Phoenix in 1983. At Central Arizona Junior College, Clark pitched on the softball team under head coach Mike Candrea and led the team to National Junior College Athletic Association titles in 1984 and 1985.

== California State Fullerton ==
Transferring to Cal State Fullerton, Clark had a 20–2 record and nation-best 0.18 ERA leading the Titans to the 1986 Women's College World Series title. She earned First Team All-Big West honors. At the World Series, Clark pitched three shutouts and surrendered just one hit and struck out 8 in the title game to defeat the Texas A&M Aggies 3-0 on May 25. She was named to the All-Tournament Team for her efforts.

As a senior in 1987, Clark went 33–5. She won the Broderick Award (now the Honda Sports Award) as the nation's top softball player in 1987. She earned First Team All-American recognition from the National Fastpitch Coaches Association and another conference honor. Clark and the Titans returned to the World Series to defend their title but eventually lost the UCLA Bruins on May 23. Clark tossed 6 innings and struck out 4 in her final appearance.

After graduating from Cal State Fullerton, Clark pitched for Team USA in 1987.

== Coaching career ==
From 1990 to 1995, Clark was an assistant coach at Florida State University. She became the inaugural head softball coach at the University of Texas at Austin in June 1995, leading the Texas Longhorns from 1997 to 2018 with a cumulative 873–401–3 record, four Big 12 Conference regular season titles, four Big 12 Conference softball tournament titles, and 19 appearances in the NCAA Tournament, including five in the Women's College World Series.

== Statistics ==
=== Cal State Fullerton Titans ===
YEAR	W	L	GP	GS	CG	SHO	SV	IP	H	R	ER	BB	SO	ERA	WHIP
1986	20	2	23	22	20	16	0	155.1	42	5	4	24	197	0.18	0.42
1987	33	5	47	36	32	21	4	283.0	133	29	19	70	261	0.47	0.71
TOTALS	53	7	70	58	52	37	4	438.1	175	34	23	94	458	0.36	0.61

== Head coaching record ==
Record table
Season	Team	Overall	Conference	Standing	Postseason
Texas Longhorns (Big 12 Conference) (1997–2018)
1997	Texas	30–24	6–10	7th	
1998	Texas	49–16	11–5	3rd	Women's College World Series
1999	Texas	45–17	10–4	2nd	NCAA Regionals
2000	Texas	30–27–1	11–5	3rd	NCAA Regionals
2001	Texas	24–29	5–13	9th	
2002	Texas	50–13	17–1	1st	NCAA Regionals
2003	Texas	49–9	15–2	1st	Women's College World Series
2004	Texas	24–25	5–13	8th	
2005	Texas	49–13	11–6	3rd	Women's College World Series
2006	Texas	55–9	15–2	1st	Women's College World Series
2007	Texas	35–20	8–10	6th	NCAA Regionals
2008	Texas	29–23–2	9–9	T–4th	NCAA Regionals
2009	Texas	40–20	11–7	4th	NCAA Regionals
2010	Texas	43–15	14–2	1st	NCAA Regionals
2011	Texas	46–10	14–4	2nd	NCAA Regionals
2012	Texas	47–13	16–8	T–3rd	NCAA Super Regionals
2013	Texas	51–10	14–4	2nd	Women's College World Series
2014	Texas	35–23	12–6	3rd	NCAA Regionals
2015	Texas	38–17	12–6	T–2nd	NCAA Regionals
2016	Texas	38–16	10–7	3rd	NCAA Regionals
2017	Texas	33–26	7–10	4th	NCAA Regionals
2018	Texas	33–26	10–8	4th	NCAA Regionals
Texas:		873–401–3 (.685)	243–142 (.631)		
Total:		873–401–3 (.685)			
National champion Postseason invitational champion Conference regular season champion Conference regular season and conference tournament champion Division regular season champion Division regular season and conference tournament champion Conference tournament champion
