= 2003 Big Ten softball tournament =

College softball tournament in Iowa

- Teams: 6
- Format: Double-elimination
- Finals site: Bob Pearl Softball Field; Iowa City, Iowa
- Champions: Iowa (2nd title)
- Runner-up: Northwestern (2nd title game)
- Winning coach: Gayle Blevins (2nd title)

2003 Big Ten Conference softball standings
	Conf.						Overall
Team	W		L		T	PCT	W		L		T	PCT
No. 16 Iowa ‍†‍‡‍^{y}	13	–	4	–	0	.765	55	–	15	–	0	.786
No. 12 Michigan ‍‍‍^{y}	13	–	5	–	0	.722	44	–	16	–	0	.733
No. 24 Michigan State ‍‍‍^{y}	13	–	6	–	0	.684	40	–	19	–	0	.678
Illinois ‍‍‍^{y}	11	–	7	–	0	.611	39	–	17	–	1	.693
Minnesota ‍‍‍^{y}	12	–	8	–	0	.600	37	–	21	–	1	.636
Northwestern ‍‍‍^{y}	11	–	9	–	0	.550	36	–	19	–	0	.655
Penn State ‍‍‍^{y}	9	–	9	–	0	.500	32	–	22	–	0	.593
Wisconsin ‍‍‍	7	–	13	–	0	.350	19	–	26	–	0	.422
Ohio State ‍‍‍	5	–	11	–	0	.313	26	–	23	–	0	.531
Purdue ‍‍‍	5	–	13	–	0	.278	34	–	27	–	0	.557
Indiana ‍‍‍	2	–	16	–	0	.111	19	–	31	–	0	.380
† – Conference champion ‡ – Tournament champion y – Invited to the NCAA tournament As of May 2003; Rankings from NFCA/USA Today

The 2003 Big Ten softball tournament was held at the Bob Pearl Softball Field on the campus of the University of Iowa in Iowa City, Iowa. As the tournament winner, Iowa earned the Big Ten Conference's automatic bid to the 2003 NCAA Division I softball tournament.

== Format and seeding ==
The 2003 tournament was a six team double-elimination tournament. The top six teams based on conference regular season winning percentage earned invites to the tournament.

== Tournament ==
First round
4	Illinois	1
5	Minnesota	0
3	Michigan State	0
6	Northwestern	1^{(18)}
3	Michigan State	6
4	Illinois	5
2	Michigan	3^{(8)}
5	Minnesota	2

Second round
1	Iowa	3
4	Illinois	2
2	Michigan	6
6	Northwestern	8^{(12)}
3	Michigan State	2
2	Michigan	0

Semi-Finals
1	Iowa	2
6	Northwestern	1
6	Northwestern	6^{(8)}
3	Michigan State	3

Finals
1	Iowa	2
6	Northwestern	0
