= 2004 UCLA Bruins softball team =

American college softball season

2004 UCLA Bruins softball

National Champion NCAA Regional champion
- Conference: Pacific-10 Conference
- Record: 47–9 (12–8 Pac-10)
- Head coach: Sue Enquist (16th season)
- Home stadium: Easton Stadium

2004 Pacific-10 Conference softball standings
	Conf.				Overall
Team	W		L	PCT	W		L	PCT
No. 8 Arizona ‍†‍‍^{y}	17	–	3	.850	55	–	6	.902
No. 2 California ‍‍‍^{y}	13	–	8	.619	53	–	13	.803
No. 4 Stanford ‍‍‍^{y}	13	–	8	.619	49	–	19	.721
No. 1 UCLA ‍‍‍^{y}	12	–	8	.600	47	–	9	.839
No. 7 Washington ‍‍‍^{y}	10	–	10	.500	40	–	19	.678
No. 12 Oregon ‍‍‍^{y}	10	–	11	.476	42	–	21	.667
No. 15 Oregon State ‍‍‍^{y}	4	–	17	.190	44	–	28	.611
Arizona State ‍‍‍	3	–	17	.150	33	–	31	.516
† – Conference champion y – Invited to the NCAA tournament As of June 30, 2004; Rankings from NFCA/USA Today

The 2004 UCLA Bruins softball team represented the University of California, Los Angeles in the 2004 college softball season. The Bruins were coached by Sue Enquist, in her sixteenth season. The Bruins played their home games at Easton Stadium and finished with a record of 47–9. They competed in the Pacific-10 Conference, where they finished fourth with a 12–8 record.

The Bruins were invited to the 2004 NCAA Division I softball tournament, where they swept the West Regional and then completed a run through the Women's College World Series to claim their tenth Women's College World Series Championship. The Bruins had earlier claimed an AIAW title in 1978 and NCAA titles in 1982, 1984, 1988, 1989, 1990, 1992, 1995, 1999, and 2003. The 1995 championship was vacated by the NCAA.

== Personnel ==
=== Roster ===
2004 UCLA Bruins roster
Pitchers: 14 – Keira Goerl – senior; 17 - Lisa Dodd – freshman; 33 – Michelle Turner – sophomore; Catchers: 10 – Jaisa Creps – freshman; 21 – Shana Stewart – freshman; 22 – Nicole Sandberg – junior	Infielders: 2 - Andrea Duran – sophomore; 19 – Caitlin Benyi – sophomore; 20 – Claire Sua – senior; 24 – Emily Zaplatosch – sophomore; 32 – Kristen Dedmon – freshman	Utility: 5 – Alissa Eno – sophomore; 11 – Ashley Herrera – freshman; 12 – Jodie Legaspi – freshman; 13 – Julie Hoshizaki – senior; 23 – Whitney Holum – freshman; Outfielders: 7 – Tara Henry – freshman; 9 – Amanda Simpson – senior; 44 – Stephanie Ramos – senior

=== Coaches ===
2004 UCLA Bruins softball coaching staff
- Sue Enquist – Head coach – 16th season
- Kelly Inouye-Perez – Assistant coach – 11th season
- Gina Vecchione – Assistant coach – 5th season
- Lisa Fernandez – Assistant coach – 8th season

== Schedule ==
Legend
	UCLA win
	UCLA loss
*	Non-Conference game

2004 UCLA Bruins softball game log
Regular season

February
Date	Opponent	Site/stadium	Score	Overall record	Pac-10 record
Feb 7	vs Santa Clara*	LBSU Softball Complex • Long Beach, CA	W 4–0	1–0	
Feb 7	vs Washington*	LBSU Softball Complex • Long Beach, CA	W 5–3	2–0	
Feb 8	at Long Beach State*	LBSU Softball Complex • Long Beach, CA	W 5–1	3–0	
Feb 8	vs San Diego State*	LBSU Softball Complex • Long Beach, CA	W 6–2	4–0	
Feb 13	vs Nebraska*	Eller Media Stadium • Paradise, NV	W 10–1^{5}	5–0	
Feb 13	vs DePaul*	Eller Media Stadium • Paradise, NV	W 10–2^{6}	6–0	
Feb 14	vs Portland State*	Eller Media Stadium • Paradise, NV	W 5–0	7–0	
Feb 14	vs Wisconsin*	Eller Media Stadium • Paradise, NV	W 8–0^{5}	8–0	
Feb 15	vs Michigan*	Eller Media Stadium • Paradise, NV	W 3–0	9–0	
Feb 20	vs Baylor*	Big League Dreams Sports Park • Cathedral City, CA	W 9–0^{5}	10–0	
Feb 20	vs Tennessee*	Big League Dreams Sports Park • Cathedral City, CA	W 3–0	11–0	
Feb 21	vs Northwestern*	Big League Dreams Sports Park • Cathedral City, CA	W 5–1	12–0	
Feb 21	vs Penn State*	Big League Dreams Sports Park • Cathedral City, CA	W 5–2	13–0	
Feb 28	UC Santa Barbara*	Easton Stadium • Los Angeles, CA	W 10–0^{6}	14–0	
Feb 28	UC Santa Barbara*	Easton Stadium • Los Angeles, CA	W 7–0	15–0	
Feb 29	Long Beach State*	Easton Stadium • Los Angeles, CA	W 4–0	16–0	

March
Date	Opponent	Site/stadium	Score	Overall record	Pac-10 record
Mar 5	vs Syracuse*	San Diego, CA	W 4–1	17–0	
Mar 5	vs Cal Poly*	San Diego, CA	W 4–0	18–0	
Mar 6	at San Diego State*	San Diego, CA	W 1–0^{10}	19–0	
Mar 7	vs Nevada*	San Diego, CA	W 3–0	20–0	
Mar 7	vs Cal Poly*	San Diego, CA	W 4–0	21–0	
Mar 11	vs Long Beach State*	Bulldog Diamond • Fresno, CA	W 5–1	22–0	
Mar 12	vs North Texas*	Bulldog Diamond • Fresno, CA	W 6–0	23–0	
Mar 13	vs Utah*	Bulldog Diamond • Fresno, CA	W 7–2	24–0	
Mar 13	vs San Diego State*	Bulldog Diamond • Fresno, CA	W 2–0	25–0	
Mar 14	vs Oregon State*	Bulldog Diamond • Fresno, CA	L 2–3	25–1	
Mar 14	at Fresno State*	Bulldog Diamond • Fresno, CA	W 2–1^{9}	26–1	
Mar 30	Cal State Fullerton*	Easton Stadium • Los Angeles, CA	W 4–3	27–1	

April
Date–	Opponent	Site/stadium	Score	Overall record	Pac-10 record
Apr 3	at Arizona	Rita Hillenbrand Memorial Stadium • Tucson, AZ	L 5–7	27–2	0–1
Apr 4	at Arizona	Rita Hillenbrand Memorial Stadium • Tucson, AZ	L 4–5	27–3	0–2
Apr 9	at Washington	Husky Softball Stadium • Seattle, WA	L 1–3	27–4	0–3
Apr 10	at Washington	Husky Softball Stadium • Seattle, WA	L 5–6	27–5	0–4
Apr 16	Oregon State	Easton Stadium • Los Angeles, CA	W 6–0	28–5	1–4
Apr 17	Oregon	Easton Stadium • Los Angeles, CA	L 3–4	28–6	1–5
Apr 18	Oregon	Easton Stadium • Los Angeles, CA	W 3–2^{10}	29–6	2–5
Apr 23	Stanford	Easton Stadium • Los Angeles, CA	L 0–1	29–7	2–6
Apr 24	California	Easton Stadium • Los Angeles, CA	W 5–1	30–7	3–6
Apr 25	California	Easton Stadium • Los Angeles, CA	W 3–1	31–7	4–6
Apr 30	at Oregon	Howe Field • Eugene, OR	W 2–0	32–7	5–6

May
Date	Opponent	Site/stadium	Score	Overall record	Pac-10 record
May 1	at Oregon State	Oregon State Softball Complex • Corvallis, OR	W 2–0	33–7	6–6
May 2	at Oregon State	Oregon State Softball Complex • Corvallis, OR	W 3–1	34–7	7–6
May 5	Washington	Easton Stadium • Los Angeles, CA	L 0–1	34–8	7–7
May 7	at California	Levine-Fricke Field • Berkeley, CA	L 1–2	34–9	7–8
May 8	at Stanford	Boyd & Jill Smith Family Stadium • Stanford, CA	W 6–2	35–9	8–8
May 9	at Stanford	Boyd & Jill Smith Family Stadium • Stanford, CA	W 7–1	36–9	9–8
May 14	Arizona	Easton Stadium • Los Angeles, CA	W 3–2	37–9	10–8
May 15	Arizona State	Easton Stadium • Los Angeles, CA	W 6–0	38–9	11–8
May 15	Arizona State	Easton Stadium • Los Angeles, CA	W 10–0^{5}	39–9	12–8

Postseason

NCAA Regional
Date	Opponent	Site/stadium	Score	Overall record	NCAAT record
May 20	Mississippi Valley State	Easton Stadium • Los Angeles, CA	W 8–0^{5}	40–9	1–0
May 21	Louisville	Easton Stadium • Los Angeles, CA	W 2–0	41–9	2–0
May 22	Alabama	Easton Stadium • Los Angeles, CA	W 5–2^{9}	42–9	3–0
May 23	Alabama	Easton Stadium • Los Angeles, CA	W 7–0	43–9	4–0

NCAA Women's College World Series
Date	Opponent	Rank	Site/stadium	Score	Overall record	WCWS Record
May 27	(7) Stanford	(2)	ASA Hall of Fame Stadium • Oklahoma City, OK	W 8–2	44–9	1–0
May 28	(3) LSU	(2)	ASA Hall of Fame Stadium • Oklahoma City, OK	W 2–0	45–9	2–0
May 30	(7) Stanford	(2)	ASA Hall of Fame Stadium • Oklahoma City, OK	W 3–1^{12}	46–9	3–0
May 31	(5) California	(2)	ASA Hall of Fame Stadium • Oklahoma City, OK	W 3–1	47–9	4–0
