= 2003 NCAA Division I softball rankings =

American collegiate softball rankings

2003 NCAA Division I softball season
- Defending Champions: California

Tournament

Women's College World Series
- Champions: UCLA (10th (12th overall) title)
- Runners-up: California (8th WCWS Appearance)
- Winning Coach: Sue Enquist (6th title)
- WCWS MOP: Keira Goerl (UCLA)

Seasons
- ← 2002 2004 →

The following human polls make up the 2003 NCAA Division I women's softball rankings. The NFCA/USA Today Poll is voted on by a panel of 32 Division I softball coaches and ranks to top 25 teams nationally.

== Legend ==
	Increase in ranking
	Decrease in ranking
	Not ranked previous week
Italics	Number of first place votes
(#–#)	Win-loss record
т	Tied with team above or below also with this symbol

== NFCA/USA Today ==
	Week 0 Pre	Week 1 Feb 18	Week 2 Feb 25	Week 3	Week 4	Week 5	Week 6	Week 7	Week 8	Week 9	Week 10	Week 11	Week Final	
1.	UCLA (18)	UCLA (9–1) (19)	UCLA (14–1) (19)	UCLA (16)	UCLA (18)	UCLA (18)	UCLA (18)	UCLA (22)	Arizona (23)	Arizona (19)	Arizona (21)	Arizona (22)	UCLA (54–7) (15)	1.
2.	Arizona (2)	Arizona (13–1)	Arizona (17–2)	Arizona (4)	Arizona (2)	Arizona (2)	Washington (1)	Arizona	UCLA	UCLA	UCLA	UCLA	California (49–20)	2.
3.	California (2)	Nebraska (9–1)	Nebraska (12–1)	Nebraska	Nebraska	Washington	Arizona (1)	Washington	Washington	Washington	Texas	Texas	Arizona (56–7)	3.
4.	Michigan т	California (10–2)	Washington (12–0–1)	Washington	Texas	Oklahoma	Oklahoma	Oklahoma	Oklahoma	Texas	Washington	DePaul	Texas (49–9)	4.
5.	Nebraska т	Washington (9–0–1)	Texas (16–0) (2)	Texas	Washington	Nebraska	Texas	Texas	Texas	Nebraska	Oklahoma	Oklahoma	Oklahoma (47–14)	5.
6.	Washington	Texas (14–0) (2)	California (12–3)	Oklahoma	Oklahoma	California	Nebraska	Nebraska	California	Oklahoma	DePaul	Cal State Fullerton	Washington (47–16–1)	6.
7.	LSU	Cal State Fullerton (10–4)	Cal State Fullerton (12–5)	LSU	California	Texas	California	California	Nebraska	Cal State Fullerton	Cal State Fullerton	Georgia	Alabama (49–21)	7.
8.	Oklahoma	DePaul (5–0)	LSU (11–4)	California	LSU	LSU	Cal State Fullerton	Georgia	Cal State Fullerton	DePaul	Nebraska	Washington	Louisiana–Lafayette (47–11)	8.
9.	Florida State	LSU (7–3)	Oklahoma (7–3)	Cal State Fullerton	Cal State Fullerton	Cal State Fullerton	Georgia	Cal State Fullerton	DePaul	Georgia	California	California	DePaul (48–7–1)	9.
10.	Cal State Fullerton	Oklahoma (5–2)	Arizona State (14–3)	Georgia	Georgia	DePaul	DePaul	DePaul	Georgia	California	Georgia	Florida State	Cal State Fullerton (41–15)	10.
11.	DePaul	Florida State (9–3)	Stanford (12–3)	Arizona State	Stanford	Georgia	LSU	LSU	LSU	LSU	LSU	Nebraska	Georgia (57–14)	11.
12.	Texas	Stanford (10–2)	Georgia (18–1)	Stanford	Arizona State	Stanford	Stanford	Arizona State	Arizona State	Arizona State	Arizona State	LSU	Michigan (44–16)	12.
13.	Arizona State	Georgia (13–1)	DePaul (6–2)	DePaul	DePaul	Arizona State	Arizona State	Stanford	Michigan	Michigan	Florida State	Oklahoma State	Nebraska (39–17)	13.
14.	Stanford	Arizona State (11–3)	Alabama (13–5)	Michigan	Michigan	South Carolina	Michigan	South Carolina	Florida State	Florida State	Michigan	Michigan	Oklahoma State (39–15)	14.
15.	Fresno State	Michigan (2–3)	Florida State (11–5)	South Carolina	South Carolina	Michigan	South Carolina	Michigan	South Carolina	Stanford	Oklahoma State	Arizona State	LSU (50–18)	15.
16.	Ohio State	South Carolina (7–3)	South Carolina (9–5)	Florida State	Florida State	Ohio State	Alabama	Florida State	Stanford	South Carolina	Stanford	Alabama	Oregon (37–19)	16.
17.	Notre Dame т	Alabama (10–5)	Oregon State (13–5)	Oregon State	Oregon State	Florida State	Florida State	Oklahoma State	Alabama	Alabama	Alabama	Stanford	Iowa (55–15)	17.
18.	Georgia т	Oregon State (11–4)	UMass (5–3)	Ohio State	Ohio State	Alabama	Oklahoma State	Alabama	Texas A&M	Oklahoma State	South Carolina	Oregon	Texas A&M (38–22)	18.
19.	Georgia Tech	Texas A&M (9–3)	Michigan (3–5)	Texas A&M	Alabama	Oregon	Oregon	Texas A&M	Oklahoma State	Texas A&M	Texas A&M	South Florida	Florida State (46–11)	19.
20.	South Carolina	Pacific (4–3)	Ohio State (5–4)	Alabama	Texas A&M	Oregon State	Texas A&M	Ohio State	Florida	Louisiana–Lafayette	South Florida	South Carolina	Arizona State (32–25)	20.
21.	Pacific	Ohio State (2–3)	Texas A&M (12–6)	UMass	South Florida	South Florida	Ohio State	Oregon	Louisiana–Lafayette	Oregon	Illinois	Louisiana–Lafayette	South Carolina (29–19)	21.
22.	Alabama	Fresno State (2–7)	South Florida (16–4)	South Florida	Oregon	Oklahoma State	Oregon State	South Florida	Oregon	South Florida	Louisiana–Lafayette	Texas A&M	Southern Illinois (39–14)	22.
23.	Oregon State	Notre Dame (2–2)	Oregon (12–5)	Oregon	Oklahoma State	Texas A&M	South Florida	Kansas	South Florida	Illinois	Oregon	Iowa	Stanford (41–16)	23.
24.	Texas A&M	Georgia Tech (4–3)	Minnesota (8–1–1)	Minnesota	UMass	Kansas	Kansas	Florida	Illinois	Iowa	Iowa	Southern Illinois	Michigan State (40–19)	24.
25.	UMass	UMass (2–3) т Oregon (9–4) т	Baylor (15–7)	Baylor	Kansas	Minnesota	Florida т Louisiana–Lafayette т	Louisiana–Lafayette	Ohio State	Florida	Florida	Florida	South Florida (54–19)	25.
	Week 0 Pre	Week 1 Feb 18	Week 2 Feb 25	Week 3	Week 4	Week 5	Week 6	Week 7	Week 8	Week 9	Week 10	Week 11	Week Final	
		None	Dropped: 20. Pacific; 22. Fresno State; 23. Notre Dame; 24. Georgia Tech	None	Dropped: 24. Minnesota; 25. Baylor	Dropped: 24. UMass	Dropped: 25. Minnesota	Dropped: 22. Oregon State	Dropped: 23. Kansas	Dropped: 25. Ohio State	None	Dropped: 21. Illinois	Dropped: 25. Florida	
