= 2003 Big 12 Conference softball tournament =

- Teams: 10
- Finals site: ASA Hall of Fame Stadium; Oklahoma City, OK
- Champions: Texas (3rd title)
- Runner-up: Oklahoma (4th title game)
- Winning coach: Connie Clark (3rd title)
- MVP: Cat Osterman (Texas)
- Attendance: 7,580

2003 Big 12 Conference softball standings
	Conf.				Overall
Team	W		L	PCT	W		L	PCT
No. 4 Texas ‍†‍‡‍^{y}	15	–	2	.882	49	–	9	.845
No. 14 Oklahoma State ‍‍‍^{y}	13	–	5	.722	39	–	15	.722
Missouri ‍‍‍^{y}	12	–	5	.706	31	–	20	.608
No. 5 Oklahoma ‍‍‍^{y}	12	–	6	.667	47	–	14	.770
No. 16 Texas A&M ‍‍‍^{y}	10	–	8	.556	38	–	22	.633
No. 13 Nebraska ‍‍‍^{y}	10	–	8	.556	39	–	17	.696
Iowa State ‍‍‍	6	–	12	.333	19	–	28	.404
Texas Tech ‍‍‍	4	–	14	.222	22	–	41	.349
Kansas ‍‍‍	4	–	14	.222	26	–	22	.542
Baylor ‍‍‍	3	–	15	.167	31	–	29	.517
† – Conference champion ‡ – Tournament champion y – Invited to the NCAA tournament Rankings from NFCA/USA Today

The 2003 Big 12 Conference softball tournament was held at ASA Hall of Fame Stadium in Oklahoma City, OK from May 1 through May 4, 2003. Texas won their third conference tournament and earned the Big 12 Conference's automatic bid to the 2003 NCAA Division I softball tournament.

Texas, Oklahoma State, Missouri, Oklahoma, Texas A&M and Nebraska received bids to the NCAA tournament. Texas and Oklahoma would go on to play in the 2003 Women's College World Series.

== Standings ==
Place	Seed	Team	Conference			Overall		
Place	Seed	Team	W	L	%	W	L	%
1	1	Texas	15	2	.882	49	9	.845
2	2	Oklahoma State	13	5	.722	39	15	.722
3	3	Missouri	12	5	.706	31	20	.608
4	4	Oklahoma	12	6	.667	47	14	.770
5	5	Texas A&M	10	8	.556	38	22	.633
5	6	Nebraska	10	8	.556	39	17	.696
7	7	Iowa State	6	12	.333	19	28	.404
8	8	Texas Tech	4	14	.222	22	41	.349
8	9	Kansas	4	14	.222	26	22	.542
10	10	Baylor	3	15	.167	31	29	.517

== Schedule ==
Game	Time	Matchup	Location	Attendance
Day 1 – Thursday, May 1
1	5:00 p.m.	#8 Texas Tech 5, #9 Kansas 1	Hall of Fame Stadium	300
2	5:00 p.m.	#10 Baylor 3, #7 Iowa State 0	Field 2	300
3	7:30 p.m.	#1 Texas 7, #8 Texas Tech 1	Hall of Fame Stadium	635
4	7:30 p.m.	#2 Oklahoma State 8, #10 Baylor 0 (6)	Field 2	635
Day 2 – Friday, May 2
5	11:00 a.m.	#4 Oklahoma 4, #5 Texas A&M 0 (9)	Hall of Fame Stadium	1,352
6	11:00 a.m.	#6 Nebraska 5, #3 Missouri 0	Field 2	1,352
7	3:00 p.m.	#5 Texas A&M 2, #8 Texas Tech 0	Hall of Fame Stadium	1,352
8	3:00 p.m.	#10 Baylor 5, #3 Missouri 4 (11)	Field 2	1,352
9	5:40 p.m.	#1 Texas 1, #4 Oklahoma 0	Hall of Fame Stadium	1,352
10	8:15 p.m.	#2 Oklahoma State 3, #6 Nebraska 2 (9)	Hall of Fame Stadium	1,352
Day 3 – Saturday, May 3
11	10:00 a.m.	#4 Oklahoma 1, #10 Baylor 0	Hall of Fame Stadium	1,423
12	12:30 p.m.	#6 Nebraska 6, #5 Texas A&M 4	Hall of Fame Stadium	1,423
13	5:07 p.m.	#4 Oklahoma 3, #2 Oklahoma State 2	Hall of Fame Stadium	1,423
14	7:46 p.m.	#1 Texas 2, #6 Nebraska 0	Hall of Fame Stadium	1,423
Day 4 – Sunday, May 4
15	10:00 a.m.	#4 Oklahoma 11, #2 Oklahoma State 2 (5)	Hall of Fame Stadium	946
16	2:37 p.m.	#1 Texas 1, #4 Oklahoma 0	Hall of Fame Stadium	1,128
Game times in CDT. Rankings denote tournament seed.

== All-Tournament Team ==
Position	Player	School
MOP	Cat Osterman	Texas
1B	Sheena Lawrick	Nebraska
2B/OF	Lindsay Gardner	Texas
SS	Stephanie Nicholson	Oklahoma State
IF	Kelli Braitsch	Oklahoma
C	Ryan Realmuto	Oklahoma State
OF	Kristin Vesely	Oklahoma
OF	Megan Carey	Oklahoma State
OF	Tina Boutelle	Texas
OF	Sarah Wieszczak	Texas
P	Cat Osterman	Texas
P	Peaches James	Nebraska
P/1B	Kami Keiter	Oklahoma
