= 2003 Arizona Wildcats softball team =

American college softball season

2003 Arizona Wildcats softball

NCAA Regional champion Pac-10 champions

Women's College World Series, 2–2
- Conference: Pacific-10 Conference
- Record: 54–5 (19–2 Pac-10)
- Head coach: Mike Candrea (18th season)

2003 Pacific-10 Conference softball standings
	Conf.						Overall
Team	W		L		T	PCT	W		L		T	PCT
No. 3 Arizona ‍†‍‍^{y}	19	–	2	–	0	.905	54	–	5	–	0	.915
No. 1 UCLA ‍‍‍^{y}	17	–	4	–	0	.810	54	–	7	–	0	.885
No. 2 California ‍‍‍^{y}	10	–	11	–	0	.476	49	–	20	–	0	.710
No. 16 Oregon ‍‍‍^{y}	10	–	11	–	0	.476	37	–	19	–	0	.661
No. 6 Washington ‍‍‍^{y}	9	–	12	–	0	.429	46	–	14	–	1	.762
No. 23 Stanford ‍‍‍^{y}	7	–	14	–	0	.333	41	–	26	–	0	.612
No. 20 Arizona State ‍‍‍^{y}	7	–	14	–	0	.333	32	–	35	–	0	.478
Oregon State ‍‍‍^{y}	5	–	16	–	0	.238	36	–	31	–	0	.537
† – Conference champion y – Invited to the NCAA tournament As of June 30, 2003; Rankings from NFCA/USA Today

The 2003 Arizona Wildcats softball team represented the University of Arizona in the 2003 NCAA Division I softball season. The Wildcats were coached by Mike Candrea, who led his eighteenth season. The Wildcats finished with a record of 54–5. They competed in the Pacific-10 Conference, where they finished first with a 19–2 record.

The Wildcats were invited to the 2003 NCAA Division I softball tournament, where they won their Regional and advanced to the Women's College World Series. They finished tied for third place with wins against Alabama and Washington and a pair of losses to eventual runner-up California.

== Personnel ==
=== Roster ===
2003 Arizona Wildcats roster
Pitchers: 6 - Shelly Schultz - Freshman; 17 - Leslie Wolfe - Freshman; 44 - Alicia Hollowell - Freshman; Catchers: 20 - Candace Abrams - Sophomore; 52 - Mackenzie Vandergeest - Junior; 77 - Jackie Coburn - Sophomore	Infielders: 3 - Lovieanne Jung - Senior; 7 - Samantha Quintero - Junior; 8 - Lisha Ribellia - Senior; 33 - Erin Palomarez - Junior	Outfielders: 0 - Autumn Champion - Freshman; 2 - Wendy Allen - Junior; 5 - Crystal Farley - Sophomore; 12 - Allyson Von Liechtenstein - Sophomore; 22 - Courtney Fossatti - Sophomore

=== Coaches ===
2003 Arizona Wildcats softball coaching staff
- Mike Candrea - Head coach - 18th season
- Larry Ray - Assistant coach - 12th season
- Nancy Evans - Assistant coach - 3rd season

== Schedule ==
Legend
	Arizona win
	Arizona loss
*	Non-Conference game

2003 Arizona Wildcats softball game log
Regular season

January/February
Date	Opponent	Rank	Site/stadium	Score	Overall record	Pac-10 record
Jan 31	vs Sam Houston State*	No. 2	USF Softball Stadium • Tampa, FL (Louisville Slugger Tournament)	W 6–0	1–0	
Jan 31	vs Florida Atlantic*	No. 2	USF Softball Stadium • Tampa, FL (Louisville Slugger Tournament)	W 2–0	2–0	
Feb 1	vs Auburn*	No. 2	USF Softball Stadium • Tampa, FL (Louisville Slugger Tournament)	W 6–0	3–0	
Feb 1	at South Florida*	No. 2	USF Softball Stadium • Tampa, FL (Louisville Slugger Tournament)	W 3–1	4–0	
Feb 2	vs Northwestern*	No. 2	USF Softball Stadium • Tampa, FL (Louisville Slugger Tournament)	W 6–0	5–0	
Feb 7	vs No. 24 Texas A&M*	No. 2	Rose Mofford Sports Complex • Phoenix, AZ (Fiesta Bowl Tournament)	W 6–0	6–0	
Feb 7	vs Southwest Texas State*	No. 2	Rose Mofford Sports Complex • Phoenix, AZ (Fiesta Bowl Tournament)	W 6–0	7–0	
Feb 8	vs Iowa State*	No. 2	Rose Mofford Sports Complex • Phoenix, AZ (Fiesta Bowl Tournament)	W 11–2 ^{(5)}	8–0	
Feb 8	vs Wisconsin*	No. 2	Rose Mofford Sports Complex • Phoenix, AZ (Fiesta Bowl Tournament)	W 1–0	9–0	
Feb 9	vs Mississippi State*	No. 2	Rose Mofford Sports Complex • Phoenix, AZ (Fiesta Bowl Tournament)	W 9–2	10–0	
Feb 9	vs No. 12 Texas*	No. 2	Rose Mofford Sports Complex • Phoenix, AZ (Fiesta Bowl Tournament)	L 1–2	10–1	
Feb 14	Minnesota*	No. 2	Rita Hillenbrand Memorial Stadium • Tucson, AZ (Pepsi Arizona Softball Classic)	W 6–0	11–1	
Feb 15	FIU*	No. 2	Rita Hillenbrand Memorial Stadium • Tucson, AZ (Pepsi Arizona Softball Classic)	W 6–3	12–1	
Feb 15	Arkansas*	No. 2	Rita Hillenbrand Memorial Stadium • Tucson, AZ (Pepsi Arizona Softball Classic)	W 9–1 ^{(5)}	13–1	
Feb 21	Drake*	No. 2	Rita Hillenbrand Memorial Stadium • Tucson, AZ (Worth Wildcat Invitational)	W 11–0 ^{(5)}	14–1	
Feb 21	Oklahoma State*	No. 2	Rita Hillenbrand Memorial Stadium • Tucson, AZ (Worth Wildcat Invitational)	L 0–1	14–2	
Feb 22	Virginia*	No. 2	Rita Hillenbrand Memorial Stadium • Tucson, AZ (Worth Wildcat Invitational)	W 13–1 ^{(5)}	15–2	
Feb 22	Western Michigan*	No. 2	Rita Hillenbrand Memorial Stadium • Tucson, AZ (Worth Wildcat Invitational)	W 10–0 ^{(5)}	16–2	
Feb 23	New Mexico*	No. 2	Rita Hillenbrand Memorial Stadium • Tucson, AZ (Worth Wildcat Invitational)	W 8–0 ^{(6)}	17–2	
Feb 28	New Mexico State*	No. 2	Rita Hillenbrand Memorial Stadium • Tucson, AZ (Hillenbrand Invitational)	W 16–0 ^{(5)}	18–2	

March
Date	Opponent	Rank	Site/stadium	Score	Overall record	Pac-10 record
Mar 1	Northern Iowa*	No. 2	Rita Hillenbrand Memorial Stadium • Tucson, AZ (Hillenbrand Invitational)	W 8–0 ^{(5)}	19–2	
Mar 1	San Diego State*	No. 2	Rita Hillenbrand Memorial Stadium • Tucson, AZ (Hillenbrand Invitational)	W 11–0 ^{(5)}	20–2	
Mar 2	San Diego State*	No. 2	Rita Hillenbrand Memorial Stadium • Tucson, AZ (Hillenbrand Invitational)	W 6–0	21–2	
Mar 7	vs New Mexico*	No. 2	Rocky Johnson Field • Lubbock, TX (Red Raider Classic)	W 9–0	22–2	
Mar 7	vs Columbia*	No. 2	Rocky Johnson Field • Lubbock, TX (Red Raider Classic)	W 12–0 ^{(5)}	23–2	
Mar 8	vs Wichita State*	No. 2	Rocky Johnson Field • Lubbock, TX (Red Raider Classic)	W 6–0	24–2	
Mar 8	at Texas Tech*	No. 2	Rocky Johnson Field • Lubbock, TX (Red Raider Classic)	W 10–0 ^{(5)}	25–2	
Mar 9	at Texas Tech*	No. 2	Rocky Johnson Field • Lubbock, TX (Red Raider Classic)	W 1–0	26–2	
Mar 13	vs No. 16 Florida State*	No. 2	Rocky Johnson Field • Lubbock, TX (Red Raider Classic)	W 2–0	27–2	
Mar 13	vs Louisiana–Lafayette*	No. 2	Rocky Johnson Field • Lubbock, TX (Red Raider Classic)	W 7–3	28–2	
Mar 14	vs Long Beach State*	No. 2	Rocky Johnson Field • Lubbock, TX (Red Raider Classic)	W 8–0 ^{(5)}	29–2	
Mar 14	vs UNLV*	No. 2	Rocky Johnson Field • Lubbock, TX (Red Raider Classic)	W 3–0	30–2	
Mar 22	No. 9 Cal State Fullerton*	No. 2	Rita Hillenbrand Memorial Stadium • Tucson, AZ	W 5–2	31–2	
Mar 22	No. 9 Cal State Fullerton*	No. 2	Rita Hillenbrand Memorial Stadium • Tucson, AZ	L 3–15	31–3	
Mar 28	No. 20 Oregon State	No. 3	Rita Hillenbrand Memorial Stadium • Tucson, AZ	W 8–0 ^{(5)}	32–3	1–0
Mar 29	No. 19 Oregon	No. 3	Rita Hillenbrand Memorial Stadium • Tucson, AZ	W 4–1	33–3	2–0
Mar 30	No. 19 Oregon	No. 3	Rita Hillenbrand Memorial Stadium • Tucson, AZ	W 8–0 ^{(6)}	34–3	3–0

April
Date	Opponent	Rank	Site/stadium	Score	Overall record	Pac-10 record
Apr 4	at No. 3 Washington	No. 2	Husky Softball Stadium • Seattle, WA	W 3–0	35–3	4–0
Apr 5	at No. 1 UCLA	No. 2	Easton Stadium • Los Angeles, CA	W 3–0	36–3	5–0
Apr 6	at No. 1 UCLA	No. 2	Easton Stadium • Los Angeles, CA	W 5–1	37–3	6–0
Apr 11	No. 16 Stanford	No. 1	Rita Hillenbrand Memorial Stadium • Tucson, AZ	L 3–4	37–4	6–1
Apr 12	No. 6 California	No. 1	Rita Hillenbrand Memorial Stadium • Tucson, AZ	W 7–5	38–4	7–1
Apr 13	No. 6 California	No. 1	Rita Hillenbrand Memorial Stadium • Tucson, AZ	W 1–0	39–4	8–1
Apr 18	No. 12 Arizona State	No. 1	Rita Hillenbrand Memorial Stadium • Tucson, AZ	W 8–0 ^{(5)}	40–4	9–1
Apr 19	No. 12 Arizona State	No. 1	Rita Hillenbrand Memorial Stadium • Tucson, AZ	W 2–1	41–4	10–1
Apr 23	at No. 12 Arizona State	No. 1	Alberta B. Farrington Softball Stadium • Tempe, AZ	W 4–2	42–4	11–1
Apr 25	at No. 23 Oregon	No. 1	Howe Field • Eugene, OR	W 8–0 ^{(5)}	43–4	12–1
Apr 26	at Oregon State	No. 1	Oregon State Softball Complex • Corvallis, OR	W 10–2 ^{(5)}	44–4	13–1
Apr 27	at Oregon State	No. 1	Oregon State Softball Complex • Corvallis, OR	W 6–4 ^{(11)}	45–4	14–1

May
Date	Opponent	Rank	Site/stadium	Score	Overall record	Pac-10 record
May 3	at No. 15 Stanford	No. 1	Boyd & Jill Smith Family Stadium • Stanford, CA	W 2–1	46–4	15–1
May 4	at No. 15 Stanford	No. 1	Boyd & Jill Smith Family Stadium • Stanford, CA	W 6–0	47–4	16–1
May 5	at No. 9 California	No. 1	Levine-Fricke Field • Berkeley, CA	W 6–0	48–4	17–1
May 9	No. 2 UCLA	No. 1	Rita Hillenbrand Memorial Stadium • Tucson, AZ	W 7–5	49–4	18–1
May 10	No. 8 Washington	No. 1	Rita Hillenbrand Memorial Stadium • Tucson, AZ	L 1–7	49–5	18–2
May 10	No. 8 Washington	No. 1	Rita Hillenbrand Memorial Stadium • Tucson, AZ	W 21–17	50–5	19–2

Postseason

NCAA Regional
Date	Opponent	Rank	Site/stadium	Score	Overall record	NCAAT record
May 15	Colorado State	No. 1	Rita Hillenbrand Memorial Stadium • Tucson, AZ	W 11–1 ^{(5)}	51–5	1–0
May 16	Minnesota	No. 1	Rita Hillenbrand Memorial Stadium • Tucson, AZ	W 4–0	52–5	2–0
May 17	Texas A&M	No. 1	Rita Hillenbrand Memorial Stadium • Tucson, AZ	W 3–0	53–5	3–0
May 18	Texas A&M	No. 1	Rita Hillenbrand Memorial Stadium • Tucson, AZ	W 10–5	54–5	4–0

NCAA Women's College World Series
Date	Opponent	Rank	Site/stadium	Score	Overall record	WCWS Record
May 22	No. 16 (8) Alabama	No. 1 (1)	ASA Hall of Fame Stadium • Oklahoma City, OK	W 3–2	55–5	1–0
May 23	No. 8 (5) Washington	No. 1 (1)	ASA Hall of Fame Stadium • Oklahoma City, OK	W 2–1	56–5	2–0
May 25	No. 9 (7) California	No. 1 (1)	ASA Hall of Fame Stadium • Oklahoma City, OK	L 1–2 ^{(12)}	56–6	2–1
May 25	No. 9 (7) California	No. 1 (1)	ASA Hall of Fame Stadium • Oklahoma City, OK	L 1–4	56–7	2–2

== Ranking movements ==
Ranking movements Legend: ██ Increase in ranking ██ Decrease in ranking
	Week												
Poll	Pre	1	2	3	4	5	6	7	8	9	10	11	Final
NFCA/USA Today	2	2	2	2	2	2	3	2	1	1	1	1	1
