= 2003 UCLA Bruins softball team =

American college softball season

2003 UCLA Bruins softball

National Champion NCAA Regional champion
- Conference: Pacific-10 Conference
- Record: 54–7 (17–4 Pac-10)
- Head coach: Sue Enquist (15th season)
- Home stadium: Easton Stadium

2003 Pacific-10 Conference softball standings
	Conf.						Overall
Team	W		L		T	PCT	W		L		T	PCT
No. 3 Arizona ‍†‍‍^{y}	19	–	2	–	0	.905	54	–	5	–	0	.915
No. 1 UCLA ‍‍‍^{y}	17	–	4	–	0	.810	54	–	7	–	0	.885
No. 2 California ‍‍‍^{y}	10	–	11	–	0	.476	49	–	20	–	0	.710
No. 16 Oregon ‍‍‍^{y}	10	–	11	–	0	.476	37	–	19	–	0	.661
No. 6 Washington ‍‍‍^{y}	9	–	12	–	0	.429	46	–	14	–	1	.762
No. 23 Stanford ‍‍‍^{y}	7	–	14	–	0	.333	41	–	26	–	0	.612
No. 20 Arizona State ‍‍‍^{y}	7	–	14	–	0	.333	32	–	35	–	0	.478
Oregon State ‍‍‍^{y}	5	–	16	–	0	.238	36	–	31	–	0	.537
† – Conference champion y – Invited to the NCAA tournament As of June 30, 2003; Rankings from NFCA/USA Today

The 2003 UCLA Bruins softball team represented the University of California, Los Angeles in the 2003 college softball season. The Bruins were coached by Sue Enquist, in her fifteenth season. The Bruins played their home games at Easton Stadium and finished with a record of 54–7. They competed in the Pacific-10 Conference, where they finished second with a 17–4 record.

The Bruins were invited to the 2003 NCAA Division I softball tournament, where they swept the West Regional and then completed a run through the Women's College World Series to claim their ninth Women's College World Series Championship. The Bruins had earlier claimed an AIAW title in 1978 and NCAA titles in 1982, 1984, 1988, 1989, 1990, 1992, 1995, and 1999. The 1995 championship was vacated by the NCAA.

== Personnel ==
=== Roster ===
2003 UCLA Bruins roster
Pitchers: 14 – Keira Goerl – junior; 33 – Michelle Turner – freshman; Catchers: 22 – Nicole Sandberg – sophomore; 24 – Emily Zaplatosch – freshman	Infielders: 2 - Andrea Duran – freshman; 3 – Allison Chislock – sophomore; 5 – Alissa Eno – freshman; 11 – Monique Mejia – senior; 13 – Julie Hoshizaki – junior; 20 – Claire Sua – junior; 21 – Tairia Mims – senior; 23 – Toria Auelua – senior; 27 - Natasha Watley – senior	Utility: 19 – Caitlin Benyi – freshman; Outfielders: 9 – Amanda Simpson – junior; 10 – Erica Corley – freshman; 44 – Stephanie Ramos – junior

=== Coaches ===
2003 UCLA Bruins softball coaching staff
- Sue Enquist – Head coach – 15th season
- Kelly Inouye-Perez – Assistant coach – 10th season
- Gina Vecchione – Assistant coach – 4th season
- Lisa Fernandez – Assistant coach – 7th season

== Schedule ==
Legend
	UCLA win
	UCLA loss
*	Non-Conference game

2003 UCLA Bruins softball game log
Regular season

January/February
Date	Opponent	Rank	Site/stadium	Score	Overall record	Pac-10 record
Jan 31	Loyola Marymount*	No. 1	Easton Stadium • Los Angeles, CA	W 9–0^{5}	1–0	
Feb 1	No. 10 Cal State Fullerton*	No. 1	Easton Stadium • Los Angeles, CA	L 0–2	1–1	
Feb 1	No. 22 Alabama*	No. 1	Easton Stadium • Los Angeles, CA	W 5–4	2–1	
Feb 2	Cal State Northridge*	No. 1	Easton Stadium • Los Angeles, CA	W 2–0	3–1	
Feb 5	at UC Riverside*	No. 1	Riverside, CA	W 15–0	4–1	
Feb 5	at UC Riverside*	No. 1	Riverside, CA	W 2–0^{5}	5–1	
Feb 14	vs No. 20 South Carolina*	No. 1	Eller Media Stadium • Paradise, NV	W 12–0^{5}	6–1	
Feb 14	vs No. 7 LSU*	No. 1	Eller Media Stadium • Paradise, NV	W 2–0	7–1	
Feb 15	vs Hawaii*	No. 1	Eller Media Stadium • Paradise, NV	W 10–2^{6}	8–1	
Feb 15	vs 4 Nebraska*	No. 1	Eller Media Stadium • Paradise, NV	W 5–1	9–1	
Feb 16	vs Utah*	No. 1	Eller Media Stadium • Paradise, NV	W 7–0	10–1	
Feb 21	vs Rutgers*	No. 1	Boca Raton, FL	W 8–1	11–1	
Feb 21	at Florida Atlantic*	No. 1	Boca Raton, FL	W 7–0	12–1	
Feb 22	vs FIU*	No. 1	Boca Raton, FL	W 3–0	13–1	
Feb 22	Long Island*	No. 1	Boca Raton, FL	W 7–0	14–1	
Feb 23	vs Rutgers*	No. 1	Boca Raton, FL	W 8–0^{5}	15–1	
Feb 26	at UC Santa Barbara*	No. 1	Santa Barbara, CA	W 6–0	16–1	
Feb 26	at UC Santa Barbara*	No. 1	Santa Barbara, CA	W 2–0	17–1	
Feb 28	Boston College*	No. 1	Easton Stadium • Los Angeles, CA	W 9–0^{5}	18–1	
Feb 28	Missouri*	No. 1	Easton Stadium • Los Angeles, CA	W 8–0^{5}	19–1	

March
Date	Opponent	Rank	Site/stadium	Score	Overall record	Pac-10 record
Mar 1	Missouri*	No. 1	Easton Stadium • Los Angeles, CA	W 5–0	20–1	
Mar 1	Boston College*	No. 1	Easton Stadium • Los Angeles, CA	W 10–1^{5}	21–1	
Mar 2	Missouri*	No. 1	Easton Stadium • Los Angeles, CA	W 2–0	22–1	
Mar 6	vs BYU*	No. 1	Bulldog Diamond • Fresno, CA	W 6–0	23–1	
Mar 7	vs St. John's*	No. 1	Bulldog Diamond • Fresno, CA	W 8–0^{5}	24–1	
Mar 8	vs Cal Poly*	No. 1	Bulldog Diamond • Fresno, CA	W 5–0	25–1	
Mar 9	vs No. 13 DePaul*	No. 1	Bulldog Diamond • Fresno, CA	L 0–	25–2	
Mar 9	at Fresno State*	No. 1	Bulldog Diamond • Fresno, CA	W 5–0	26–2	
Mar 25	at No. 8 Cal State Fullerton*	No. 1	Fullerton, CA	W 11–2^{5}	27–2	
Mar 25	at No. 8 Cal State Fullerton*	No. 1	Fullerton, CA	W 8–2	28–2	
Mar 28	at No. 12 Stanford	No. 1	Boyd & Jill Smith Family Stadium • Stanford, CA	W 5–0	29–2	1–0
Mar 29	at No. 7 California	No. 1	Levine-Fricke Field • Berkeley, CA	W 3–0	30–2	2–0
Mar 30	at No. 7 California	No. 1	Levine-Fricke Field • Berkeley, CA	W 4–1^{8}	31–2	3–0

April
Date–	Opponent	Rank	Site/stadium	Score	Overall record	Pac-10 record
Apr 4	No. 12 Arizona State	No. 1	Easton Stadium • Los Angeles, CA	W 6–0	32–2	4–0
Apr 5	No. 2 Arizona	No. 1	Easton Stadium • Los Angeles, CA	L 0–3	32–3	4–1
Apr 6	No. 2 Arizona	No. 1	Easton Stadium • Los Angeles, CA	L 1–5	32–4	4–2
Apr 11	at Oregon State	No. 2	Oregon State Softball Complex • Corvallis, OR	W 6–1	33–4	5–2
Apr 12	at No. 22 Oregon	No. 2	Howe Field • Eugene, OR	L 4–	33–5	5–3
Apr 13	at No. 22 Oregon	No. 2	Howe Field • Eugene, OR	W 9–3	34–5	6–3
Apr 18	No. 3 Washington	No. 2	Easton Stadium • Los Angeles, CA	W 5–2	35–5	7–3
Apr 19	No. 3 Washington	No. 2	Easton Stadium • Los Angeles, CA	W 10–0^{6}	36–5	8–3
Apr 25	No. 9 California	No. 2	Easton Stadium • Los Angeles, CA	W 10–0^{5}	37–5	9–3
Apr 26	No. 16 Stanford	No. 2	Easton Stadium • Los Angeles, CA	W 1–0	38–5	10–3
Apr 27	No. 16 Stanford	No. 2	Easton Stadium • Los Angeles, CA	W 3–2^{8}	39–5	11–3
Apr 30	at No. 3 Washington	No. 2	Husky Softball Stadium • Seattle, WA	W 11–0	40–5	12–3

May
Date	Opponent	Rank	Site/stadium	Score	Overall record	Pac-10 record
May 2	No. 23 Oregon	No. 2	Easton Stadium • Los Angeles, CA	W 4–3	41–5	13–3
May 4	Oregon State	No. 2	Easton Stadium • Los Angeles, CA	W 10–2^{6}	42–5	14–3
May 4	Oregon State	No. 2	Easton Stadium • Los Angeles, CA	W 9–1^{5}	43–5	15–3
May 9	at No. 1 Arizona	No. 2	Rita Hillenbrand Memorial Stadium • Tucson, AZ	L 5–7	43–6	15–4
May 10	at No. 12 Arizona State	No. 2	Alberta B. Farrington Softball Stadium • Tempe, AZ	W 8–0^{6}	44–6	16–4
May 10	at No. 12 Arizona State	No. 2	Alberta B. Farrington Softball Stadium • Tempe, AZ	W 9–0^{5}	45–6	17–4

Postseason

NCAA Regional
Date	Opponent	Rank	Site/stadium	Score	Overall record	NCAAT record
May 15	Colgate	No. 2	Bulldog Diamond • Fresno, CA	W 8–0^{6}	46–6	1–0
May 16	Fresno State	No. 2	Bulldog Diamond • Fresno, CA	W 3–0	47–6	2–0
May 17	Michigan State	No. 2	Bulldog Diamond • Fresno, CA	W 6–2	48–6	3–0
May 18	Michigan State	No. 2	Bulldog Diamond • Fresno, CA	W 5–0	49–6	4–0

NCAA Women's College World Series
Date	Opponent	Rank (Seed)	Site/stadium	Score	Overall record	WCWS Record
May 22	No. 9 (7) California	No. 2 (2)	ASA Hall of Fame Stadium • Oklahoma City, OK	L 3–7^{10}	49–7	0–1
May 24	No. 21 (6) Louisiana–Lafayette	No. 2 (2)	ASA Hall of Fame Stadium • Oklahoma City, OK	W 5–1	50–7	1–1
May 24	No. 8 (5) Washington	No. 2 (2)	ASA Hall of Fame Stadium • Oklahoma City, OK	W 2–1	51–7	2–1
May 25	No. 3 (3) Texas	No. 2 (2)	ASA Hall of Fame Stadium • Oklahoma City, OK	W 3–0	52–7	3–1
May 25	No. 3 (3) Texas	No. 2 (2)	ASA Hall of Fame Stadium • Oklahoma City, OK	W 2–1	53–7	4–1
May 26	No. 9 (7) California	No. 2 (2)	ASA Hall of Fame Stadium • Oklahoma City, OK	W 1–0^{9}	54–7	5–1

== Ranking movements ==
Ranking movements Legend: ██ Increase in ranking ██ Decrease in ranking
	Week												
Poll	Pre	1	2	3	4	5	6	7	8	9	10	11	Final
NFCA/USA Today	1	1	1	1	1	1	1	1	2	2	2	2	1
