= 2004 California Golden Bears softball team =

American college softball season

2004 California Golden Bears softball

NCAA Lincoln Regional champion

Women's College World Series, runner-up
- Conference: Pacific-10 Conference
- Record: 53–13 (13–8 Pac-10)
- Head coach: Diane Ninemire (17th season)
- Home stadium: Levine-Fricke Field

2004 Pacific-10 Conference softball standings
	Conf.				Overall
Team	W		L	PCT	W		L	PCT
Arizona ‍†‍‍^{y}	17	–	3	.850	55	–	6	.902
California ‍‍‍^{y}	13	–	8	.619	53	–	13	.803
Stanford ‍‍‍^{y}	13	–	8	.619	49	–	19	.721
UCLA ‍‍‍^{y}	12	–	8	.600	47	–	9	.839
Washington ‍‍‍^{y}	10	–	10	.500	40	–	19	.678
Oregon ‍‍‍^{y}	10	–	11	.476	42	–	21	.667
Oregon State ‍‍‍^{y}	4	–	17	.190	44	–	28	.611
Arizona State ‍‍‍	3	–	17	.150	33	–	31	.516
† – Conference champion y – Invited to the NCAA tournament As of June 30, 2004; Rankings from Coaches' Poll

The 2004 California Golden Bears softball team represented the University of California, Berkeley in the 2004 NCAA Division I softball season. The Golden Bears were coached by Diane Ninemire, who led her seventeenth season. The Golden Bears finished with a record of 53–13.

The Golden Bears were invited to the 2004 NCAA Division I Softball Tournament, where they swept the NCAA Lincoln Regional and then completed a run to the title game of the Women's College World Series where they fell to champion UCLA.

== Roster ==
2004 California Golden Bears roster
Pitchers: - Kelly Anderson; - Kristina Thorson; Catchers: - Haley Woods	Infielders: - Vicky Galindo; - Jessica Pamanian; - Chelsea Spencer; - Jessica Vernaglia; Outfielders: - Kristen Bayless; - Kaleo Eldredge; - Lindsay James; - Roni Rodrigues; - Alex Sutton	- Sarah Adams; - Gwen Arafiles; - Emily Friedman; - Shannon Harper; - Alyssa Smoke

== Schedule ==
Legend
	California win
	California loss
*	Non-Conference game

2004 California Golden Bears softball game log
Regular season

January/February
Date	Opponent	Site/stadium	Score	Overall record	Pac-10 record
Jan 31	Sacramento State*	Levine-Fricke Field • Berkeley, CA	W 4–2	1–0	
Jan 31	Sacramento State*	Levine-Fricke Field • Berkeley, CA	W 8–0	2–0	
Feb 1	Saint Mary's*	Levine-Fricke Field • Berkeley, CA	W 7–1	3–0	
Feb 1	Saint Mary's*	Levine-Fricke Field • Berkeley, CA	W 9–2	4–0	
Feb 5	at San Jose State*	Spartan Softball Stadium • San Jose, CA	W 3–0	5–0	
Feb 5	at San Jose State*	Spartan Softball Stadium • San Jose, CA	W 1–0	6–0	
Feb 13	vs Notre Dame*	Eller Media Stadium • Paradise, NV (UNLV Tournament)	W 2–1	7–0	
Feb 13	at UNLV*	Eller Media Stadium • Paradise, NV (UNLV Tournament)	W 12–0	8–0	
Feb 14	vs LSU*	Eller Media Stadium • Paradise, NV (UNLV Tournament)	W 5–1	9–0	
Feb 14	vs DePaul*	Eller Media Stadium • Paradise, NV (UNLV Tournament)	W 17–0	10–0	
Feb 15	vs Cal Poly*	Eller Media Stadium • Paradise, NV (UNLV Tournament)	W 4–1	11–0	
Feb 20	vs FIU*	Campus Diamond • Santa Barbara, CA (UCSB Tournament)	W 1–0	12–0	
Feb 21	at UC Santa Barbara*	Campus Diamond • Santa Barbara, CA (UCSB Tournament)	W 7–2	13–0	
Feb 27	vs Florida Atlantic*	Golden Park • Columbus, GA (NFCA Leadoff Classic)	W 4–1	14–0	
Feb 27	vs Ohio State*	Golden Park • Columbus, GA (NFCA Leadoff Classic)	W 6–0	15–0	
Feb 28	vs LSU*	Golden Park • Columbus, GA (NFCA Leadoff Classic)	L 1–6	15–1	
Feb 28	vs Nebraska*	Golden Park • Columbus, GA (NFCA Leadoff Classic)	L 0–3	15–2	
Feb 29	vs Princeton*	Golden Park • Columbus, GA (NFCA Leadoff Classic)	W 2–0	16–2	
Feb 29	vs Texas*	Golden Park • Columbus, GA (NFCA Leadoff Classic)	W 10–1	17–2	

March
Date	Opponent	Site/stadium	Score	Overall record	Pac-10 record
Mar 5	vs Portland State*	Anderson Family Field • Fullerton, CA (Worth Tournament)	W 6–0	18–2	
Mar 5	at Cal State Fullerton*	Anderson Family Field • Fullerton, CA (Worth Tournament)	W 11–0	19–2	
Mar 6	vs Cal State Northridge*	Anderson Family Field • Fullerton, CA (Worth Tournament)	W 3–1	20–2	
Mar 6	vs Michigan State*	Anderson Family Field • Fullerton, CA (Worth Tournament)	W 6–2	21–2	
Mar 7	vs UC Santa Barbara*	Anderson Family Field • Fullerton, CA (Worth Tournament)	W 3–2	22–2	
Mar 9	at Pacific*	Bill Simoni Field • Stockton, CA	L 1–2	22–3	
Mar 12	vs Purdue*	Twin Creeks Sports Complex • Sunnyvale, CA (National Invitational Softball Tournament)	W 8–0	23–3	
Mar 12	vs Virginia*	Twin Creeks Sports Complex • Sunnyvale, CA (National Invitational Tournament)	W 8–0	24–3	
Mar 13	vs Minnesota*	Twin Creeks Sports Complex • Sunnyvale, CA (National Invitational Tournament)	W 6–2	25–3	
Mar 13	vs Iowa*	Twin Creeks Sports Complex • Sunnyvale, CA (National Invitational Tournament)	W 8–2	26–3	
Mar 14	vs Washington*	Twin Creeks Sports Complex • Sunnyvale, CA (National Invitational Tournament)	W 5–4	27–3	
Mar 16	Wisconsin*	Levine-Fricke Field • Berkeley, CA	W 3–1	28–3	
Mar 18	vs Utah*	Rainbow Wahine Softball Stadium • Honolulu, HI (Hawaii Invitational)	W 8–3	29–3	
Mar 18	vs Texas*	Rainbow Wahine Softball Stadium • Honolulu, HI (Hawaii Invitational)	W 7–1	30–3	
Mar 19	vs Nittaidai (Japan)*	Rainbow Wahine Softball Stadium • Honolulu, HI	W 5–1	Exh.	
Mar 20	vs Northwestern*	Rainbow Wahine Softball Stadium • Honolulu, HI (Hawaii Invitational)	W 4–2	31–3	
Mar 20	vs Hawaii*	Rainbow Wahine Softball Stadium • Honolulu, HI (Hawaii Invitational)	W 2–1	32–3	

April
Date	Opponent	Site/stadium	Score	Overall record	Pac-10 record
Apr 2	Oregon	Levine-Fricke Field • Berkeley, CA	L 0–4	32–4	0–1
Apr 3	Oregon State	Levine-Fricke Field • Berkeley, CA	W 4–1	33–4	1–1
Apr 4	Oregon State	Levine-Fricke Field • Berkeley, CA	L 2–4	33–5	1–2
Apr 9	Stanford	Levine-Fricke Field • Berkeley, CA	L 3–5	33–6	1–3
Apr 10	at Stanford	Boyd & Jill Smith Family Stadium • Stanford, CA	W 1–0	34–6	2–3
Apr 10	at Stanford	Boyd & Jill Smith Family Stadium • Stanford, CA	W 6–0	35–6	3–3
Apr 13	at Santa Clara*	Marsalli Park • Santa Clara, CA	W 5–0	36–6	
Apr 16	Arizona State	Levine-Fricke Field • Berkeley, CA	W 1–0	37–6	4–3
Apr 17	Arizona	Levine-Fricke Field • Berkeley, CA	L 0–2	37–7	4–4
Apr 18	Arizona	Levine-Fricke Field • Berkeley, CA	L 2–3	37–8	4–5
Apr 23	at Washington	Husky Softball Stadium • Seattle, WA	W 6–1	38–8	5–5
Apr 24	at UCLA	Easton Stadium • Los Angeles, CA	L 1–5	38–9	5–6
Apr 25	at UCLA	Easton Stadium • Los Angeles, CA	L 1–3	38–10	5–7
Apr 30	at Arizona	Rita Hillenbrand Memorial Stadium • Tucson, AZ	L 0–8	38–11	5–8

May
Date	Opponent	Site/stadium	Score	Overall record	Pac-10 record
May 1	at Arizona State	Alberta B. Farrington Softball Stadium • Tempe, AZ	W 6–0	39–11	6–8
May 2	at Arizona State	Alberta B. Farrington Softball Stadium • Tempe, AZ	W 13–0	40–11	7–8
May 7	UCLA	Levine-Fricke Field • Berkeley, CA	W 2–1	41–11	8–8
May 8	Washington	Levine-Fricke Field • Berkeley, CA	W 3–1	42–11	9–8
May 9	Washington	Levine-Fricke Field • Berkeley, CA	W 8–0	43–11	10–8
May 14	at Oregon State	OSU Softball Complex • Corvallis, OR	W 4–2	44–11	11–8
May 15	at Oregon	Howe Field • Eugene, OR	W 3–1	45–11	12–8
May 15	at Oregon	Howe Field • Eugene, OR	W 5–2	46–11	13–8

Postseason

NCAA Lincoln Regional
Date	Opponent	Seed	Site/stadium	Score	Overall record	Reg record
May 20	Maine	(5)	Bowlin Stadium • Lincoln, NE	W 4–0	47–11	1–0
May 21	Mississippi State	(5)	Bowlin Stadium • Lincoln, NE	W 2–1	48–11	2–0
May 22	Nebraska	(5)	Bowlin Stadium • Lincoln, NE	W 2–0	49–11	3–0
May 23	Nebraska	(5)	Bowlin Stadium • Lincoln, NE	W 2–0	50–11	4–0

NCAA Women's College World Series
Date	Opponent	Seed	Site/stadium	Score	Overall record	WCWS Record
May 27	(4) Florida State	(5)	ASA Hall of Fame Stadium • Oklahoma City, OK	W 4–2	51–11	1–0
May 23	(1) Oklahoma	(5)	ASA Hall of Fame Stadium • Oklahoma City, OK	W 2–1^{8}	52–11	2–0
June 1	(3) LSU	(5)	ASA Hall of Fame Stadium • Oklahoma City, OK	L 1–4	52–12	2–1
June 1	(3) LSU	(5)	ASA Hall of Fame Stadium • Oklahoma City, OK	W 4–1	53–12	3–1
June 3	(2) UCLA	(5)	ASA Hall of Fame Stadium • Oklahoma City, OK	L 1–3	53–13	3–2
