= 2004 Big Ten softball tournament =

College softball tournament in Michigan

- Teams: 8
- Format: Single-elimination
- Finals site: Alumni Field; Ann Arbor, Michigan
- Champions: Michigan State (1st title)
- Runner-up: Illinois (1st title game)
- Winning coach: Jacquie Joseph (1st title)
- MVP: Brittney Green (Michigan State)

2004 Big Ten Conference softball standings
	Conf.				Overall
Team	W		L	PCT	W		L	PCT
No. 9 Michigan ‍†‍‍^{y}	17	–	3	.850	54	–	11	.831
No. 17 Illinois ‍‍‍^{y}	14	–	6	.700	45	–	21	.682
Iowa ‍‍‍^{y}	14	–	6	.700	39	–	24	.619
Northwestern ‍‍‍^{y}	13	–	9	.591	34	–	20	.630
Minnesota ‍‍‍	10	–	10	.500	33	–	23	.589
Ohio State ‍‍‍^{y}	8	–	11	.421	35	–	25	.583
Michigan State ‍‍‡‍^{y}	8	–	12	.400	36	–	26	.581
Penn State ‍‍‍	8	–	12	.400	25	–	32	.439
Indiana ‍‍‍	7	–	13	.350	32	–	31	.508
Wisconsin ‍‍‍	6	–	14	.300	29	–	28	.509
Purdue ‍‍‍	5	–	14	.263	32	–	25	.561
† – Conference champion ‡ – Tournament champion y – Invited to the NCAA tournament As of May 24, 2004; Rankings from NFCA

The 2004 Big Ten softball tournament was held at Alumni Field on the campus of the University of Michigan in Ann Arbor, Michigan, from May 13 through May 15, 2004. As the tournament winner, Michigan State earned the Big Ten Conference's automatic bid to the 2004 NCAA Division I softball tournament. As the eighth-seed, Michigan State became the lowest-seeded team to win the tournament.

== Format and seeding ==
The 2004 tournament was an eight team single-elimination tournament. The top eight teams based on conference regular season winning percentage earned invites to the tournament.

== Tournament ==
Quarterfinals; May 13 and 14
1	Michigan	1
8	Michigan State	5
5	Minnesota	2^{(11)}
4	Northwestern	5
2	Illinois	1
7	Penn State	0
3	Iowa	1
6	Ohio State	5

Semifinals; May 15
8	Michigan State	2
4	Northwestern	0
2	Illinois	5
6	Ohio State	0

Championship; May 15
8	Michigan State	7
2	Illinois	5

== All-Tournament Team ==
- Sarah Baumgartner (Illinois)
- Amanda Fortune (Illinois)
- Lindsey Hamma (Illinois)
- Jessica Beech (Michigan State)
- Natalie Furrow (Michigan State)
- Brittney Green (Michigan State)
- Angel Merren (Michigan State)
- Kristen Amegin (Northwestern)
- Eileen Canney (Northwestern)
- Carri Leto (Northwestern)
- Kristi DeVries (Ohio State)
- Megan Schwab (Ohio State)

=== Tournament MVP ===
- Brittney Green (Michigan State)
