= 2005 Big 12 Conference softball tournament =

- Teams: 10
- Finals site: ASA Hall of Fame Stadium; Oklahoma City, OK
- Champions: Texas (4th title)
- Runner-up: Missouri (2nd title game)
- Winning coach: Connie Clark (4th title)
- MVP: Cat Osterman (Texas)
- Attendance: 6,546

2005 Big 12 Conference softball standings
	Conf.				Overall
Team	W		L	PCT	W		L	PCT
No. 11 Texas A&M ‍†‍‍^{y}	14	–	4	.778	47	–	10	.825
No. 13 Oklahoma ‍‍‍^{y}	12	–	6	.667	50	–	17	.746
No. 5 Texas ‍‍‍^{y}	11	–	6	.647	49	–	13	.790
No. 12 Baylor ‍‍‍^{y}	11	–	7	.611	51	–	14	.785
No. 20 Missouri ‍‍‍^{y}	10	–	8	.556	44	–	15	.746
Kansas ‍‍‡‍^{y}	9	–	8	.529	31	–	24	.564
No. 25 Nebraska ‍‍‍^{y}	9	–	9	.500	36	–	23	.610
Oklahoma State ‍‍‍^{y}	7	–	11	.389	35	–	24	.593
Texas Tech ‍‍‍	3	–	15	.167	23	–	25	.479
Iowa State ‍‍‍	3	–	15	.167	18	–	32	.360
† – Conference champion ‡ – Tournament champion y – Invited to the NCAA tournament Rankings from NFCA

The 2005 Big 12 Conference softball tournament was held at ASA Hall of Fame Stadium in Oklahoma City, OK from May 11 through May 14, 2005. Texas won their fourth conference tournament and earned the Big 12 Conference's automatic bid to the 2005 NCAA Division I softball tournament.

Texas A&M, Oklahoma, Texas, Baylor, Missouri, Kansas, Nebraska and Oklahoma State received bids to the NCAA tournament. Texas would go on to play in the 2005 Women's College World Series.

== Standings ==
Place	Seed	Team	Conference			Overall		
Place	Seed	Team	W	L	%	W	L	%
1	1	Texas A&M	14	4	.778	47	10	.825
2	2	Oklahoma	12	6	.667	50	17	.746
3	3	Texas	11	6	.647	49	13	.790
4	4	Baylor	11	7	.611	51	14	.785
5	5	Missouri	10	8	.556	44	15	.746
6	6	Kansas	9	8	.529	31	24	.564
7	7	Nebraska	9	9	.500	36	23	.610
8	8	Oklahoma State	7	11	.389	35	24	.593
9	9	Texas Tech	3	15	.167	23	25	.479
9	10	Iowa State	3	15	.167	18	32	.360

== Schedule ==
Game	Time	Matchup	Location	Attendance
Day 1 – Wednesday, May 11
1	5:00 p.m.	#8 Oklahoma State 8, #9 Texas Tech 0 (6)	Hall of Fame Stadium	1,802
2	5:00 p.m.	#7 Nebraska 6, #10 Iowa State 0	Field 2	1,802
3	7:45 p.m.	#1 Texas A&M 7, #8 Oklahoma State 5	Hall of Fame Stadium	1,802
4	7:59 p.m.	#7 Nebraska 1, #2 Oklahoma 0	Field 2	1,802
Day 2 – Thursday, May 12
5	11:00 a.m.	#4 Baylor 7, #5 Missouri 3 (9)	Hall of Fame Stadium	960
6	11:00 a.m.	#3 Texas 1, #6 Kansas 0 (8)	Field 2	960
7	2:00 p.m.	#5 Missouri 5, #8 Oklahoma State 1	Hall of Fame Stadium	960
8	2:00 p.m.	#2 Oklahoma 5, #6 Kansas 0 (11)	Field 2	960
9	5:00 p.m.	#4 Baylor 11, #1 Texas A&M 4	Hall of Fame Stadium	960
10	7:36 p.m.	#3 Texas 3, #7 Nebraska 0	Hall of Fame Stadium	960
Day 3 – Friday, May 13
11	11:00 a.m.	#2 Oklahoma 6, #1 Texas A&M 2	Hall of Fame Stadium	905
12	12:30 p.m.	#5 Missouri 5, #7 Nebraska 1	Hall of Fame Stadium	905
13	5:00 p.m.	#3 Texas 3, #2 Oklahoma 1	Hall of Fame Stadium	1,143
14	8:25 p.m.	#5 Missouri 9, #4 Baylor 2	Hall of Fame Stadium	1,143
Day 4 – Saturday, May 14
15	12:35 p.m.	#5 Missouri 10, #4 Baylor 4 (8)	Hall of Fame Stadium	1,146
16	3:38 p.m.	#3 Texas 2, #5 Missouri 0	Hall of Fame Stadium	1,146
Game times in CDT. Rankings denote tournament seed.

== All-Tournament Team ==
Position	Player	School
MOP	Cat Osterman	Texas
2B/SS	Chez Sievers	Texas
SS	Heather Kunkel	Missouri
IF	Carrie Leerberg	Baylor
IF	Kim Wilmoth	Baylor
C	Heather Scaglione	Oklahoma
C/UTL	Megan Willis	Texas
OF	Kelly Osburn	Baylor
OF	Janessa Roening	Missouri
OF	Tina Boutelle	Texas
P	Cat Osterman	Texas
P	Erin Kalka	Missouri
P/IF	Jen Bruck	Missouri
P	Kami Keiter	Oklahoma
P/3B	Megan Gibson	Texas A&M
