= Lisa Dodd =

American softball coach

Biographical details
- Born: September 4, 1984 (age 42); San Diego, California, U.S.

Playing career
- 2004–2007: UCLA
- 2007–2009: Fiorini Forli (Italy)
- Position: Pitcher/Second baseman

Coaching career (HC unless noted)
- 2008: UCLA (GA)
- 2009: Nevada (assistant)
- 2010–2012: Oregon (assistant)
- 2013–2017: UNLV
- 2018–2019: Santa Clara

Head coaching record
- Overall: 146–218 (.401)

Accomplishments and honors

Championships
- As player: Women's College World Series (2004); Women's College World Series runner-up (2005); Pac-10 (2006)

Awards
- Schutt Coaching Staff of the Year (2012)

Lisa Nicole Dodd (born September 4, 1984) is an American college softball coach and former player who was the head coach at Santa Clara from 2018 to 2019 and UNLV 2013 to 2017. Dodd played college softball at UCLA.

== Early life and education ==
Born and raised in San Diego, Dodd attended Mira Mesa Senior High School for three years before transferring to University City High School for her senior year. Graduating from University City High in 2003, Dodd won the Gatorade Softball Player of the Year award as a senior.

After high school, Dodd played for the United States women's junior national softball team in October 2003 for the Junior Women's Softball World Championship, at which the U.S. won silver.

Playing collegiately at UCLA from 2004 to 2007, Dodd was a three-time All-Region and All-Pac-10 selection. During her time as a Bruin, Dodd hit 36 home runs, currently 8th most in UCLA softball history. As a pitcher she posted a 41-11 career record in the circle and a 1.47 career ERA. Dodd was part of the 2004 Women's College World Series championship team and two other teams that qualified for the 2005 and 2006 championship series as well, in addition to the 2006 Pac-10 title. As a senior in 2007, Dodd had career bests in batting average (.369), home runs (a team-leading 14), and RBI (49) and earned second-team NFCA All-American and first-team All-Pac-10 honors. Dodd graduated from UCLA in 2008 with a bachelor's degree in sociology and minor in women's studies.

== Professional softball career ==
After graduating from UCLA in 2007, Dodd played professional softball in Italy for two seasons, winning the 2007 European Championship and the 2008 Italian Championship.

== Coaching career ==
After serving as an undergraduate assistant for the UCLA Bruins in 2008, Dodd was hired as the assistant and hitting coach for the University of Nevada Wolf Pack serving under head coach Matt Meuchel beginning in the 2009 season, in which Nevada went 40–19 as Western Athletic Conference co-champions and an appearance in the NCAA Tournament.

After one season with Nevada, Dodd served as an assistant at Oregon under Mike White from 2010 to 2012, during which time Oregon made three Super Regionals and played in the 2012 Women's College World Series. Dodd also served as assistant coach for the Carolina Diamonds of National Pro Fastpitch in the summer of 2012 and shared the Schutt Coaching Staff of the Year award.

On June 21, 2012, UNLV hired Dodd as head coach. In four seasons at UNLV, Dodd went 121–147. The 2014 season was Dodd's most successful at UNLV, with a share of second place in the Mountain West Conference (MW) and Garie Blando winning the MW Player of the Year award.

From 2013 to 2016, Dodd was a pitching and defensive assistant coach with the United States women's national softball team and the junior national team as well.

Returning to California, Dodd became head coach at Santa Clara on June 27, 2017. Dodd inherited a program that had not had a winning season since 2004. Santa Clara went 9–37 in her debut season.

On June 24, 2019, Santa Clara announced that Dodd was stepping away from coaching to pursue opportunities outside of coaching and that Gina Carbonatto would be her replacement.

== Head coaching record ==
Record table
Season	Team	Overall	Conference	Standing	Postseason
UNLV Rebels (Mountain West Conference) (2013–2017)
2013	UNLV	21–31	7–11	6th	
2014	UNLV	26–28	15–9	T–2nd	
2015	UNLV	25–30	11–13	T–5th	
2016	UNLV	24–31	8–16	8th	
2017	UNLV	25–27	8–16	8th	
UNLV:		121–147 (.451)	49–65 (.430)		
Santa Clara Broncos (West Coast Conference) (2018–2019)
2018	Santa Clara	9–37	4–11	T–4th	
2019	Santa Clara	16–34	8–7	3rd	
Santa Clara:		25–71 (.260)	12–18 (.400)		
Total:		146–218 (.401)			
