= 2003 California Golden Bears softball team =

American college softball season

2003 California Golden Bears softball

NCAA Ann Arbor Regional champion

Women's College World Series, runner-up
- Conference: Pacific-10 Conference
- Record: 49–20 (10–11 Pac-10)
- Head coach: Diane Ninemire (16th season)
- Home stadium: Levine-Fricke Field

2003 Pacific-10 Conference softball standings
	Conf.						Overall
Team	W		L		T	PCT	W		L		T	PCT
No. 3 Arizona ‍†‍‍^{y}	19	–	2	–	0	.905	54	–	5	–	0	.915
No. 1 UCLA ‍‍‍^{y}	17	–	4	–	0	.810	54	–	7	–	0	.885
No. 2 California ‍‍‍^{y}	10	–	11	–	0	.476	49	–	20	–	0	.710
No. 16 Oregon ‍‍‍^{y}	10	–	11	–	0	.476	37	–	19	–	0	.661
No. 6 Washington ‍‍‍^{y}	9	–	12	–	0	.429	46	–	14	–	1	.762
No. 23 Stanford ‍‍‍^{y}	7	–	14	–	0	.333	41	–	26	–	0	.612
No. 20 Arizona State ‍‍‍^{y}	7	–	14	–	0	.333	32	–	35	–	0	.478
Oregon State ‍‍‍^{y}	5	–	16	–	0	.238	36	–	31	–	0	.537
† – Conference champion y – Invited to the NCAA tournament As of June 30, 2003; Rankings from NFCA/USA Today

The 2003 California Golden Bears softball team represented the University of California, Berkeley in the 2003 NCAA Division I softball season. The Golden Bears were coached by Diane Ninemire, who led her sixteenth season. The Golden Bears finished with a record of 49–20.

The Golden Bears were invited to the 2003 NCAA Division I Softball Tournament, where they swept the NCAA Ann Arbor Regional and then completed a run to the title game of the Women's College World Series where they fell to champion UCLA.

== Roster ==
2003 California Golden Bears roster
Pitchers: - Kelly Anderson; - Cassie Bobrow; - Jen Deering; - Kristina Thorson; Catchers: - Courtney Scott; - Haley Woods	Infielders: - Vicky Galindo; - Veronica Nelson; - Jessica Pamanian; - Chelsea Spencer; - Jessica Vernaglia; Outfielders: - Kristen Bayless; - Kaleo Eldredge; - Lindsay James; - Roni Rodrigues	- LeAnna Hoglen; - Eryn Manahan; - Mikella Pedretti; - Chanel Tripp; - Linzi Wescott

== Schedule ==
Legend
	California win
	California loss
*	Non-Conference game

2003 California Golden Bears softball game log
Regular season

January/February
Date	Opponent	Site/stadium	Score	Overall record	Pac-10 record
Jan 31	San Jose State*	Levine-Fricke Field • Berkeley, CA	W 3–1	1–0	
Jan 31	Tennessee*	Levine-Fricke Field • Berkeley, CA	W 8–4	2–0	
Feb 1	Tennessee*	Levine-Fricke Field • Berkeley, CA	W 11–1	3–0	
Feb 1	San Jose State*	Levine-Fricke Field • Berkeley, CA	W 9–0	4–0	
Feb 8	Pacific*	Levine-Fricke Field • Berkeley, CA	W 4–0	5–0	
Feb 9	Saint Mary's*	Levine-Fricke Field • Berkeley, CA	W 8–2	6–0	
Feb 9	Saint Mary's*	Levine-Fricke Field • Berkeley, CA	W 8–1	7–0	
Feb 14	vs Purdue*	Eller Media Stadium • Paradise, NV (UNLV Tournament)	W 1–0	8–0	
Feb 14	vs Texas Tech*	Eller Media Stadium • Paradise, NV (UNLV Tournament)	W 7–0	9–0	
Feb 15	vs Nebraska*	Eller Media Stadium • Paradise, NV (UNLV Tournament)	L 1–6	9–1	
Feb 15	vs Portland State*	Eller Media Stadium • Paradise, NV (UNLV Tournament)	W 5–0	10–1	
Feb 16	vs Hawaii*	Eller Media Stadium • Paradise, NV (UNLV Tournament)	L 0–1	10–2	
Feb 22	vs Alabama*	Golden Park • Columbus, GA (NFCA Leadoff Classic)	L 2–4	10–3	
Feb 22	vs Notre Dame*	Golden Park • Columbus, GA (NFCA Leadoff Classic)	W 6–0	11–3	
Feb 23	vs Illinois State*	Golden Park • Columbus, GA (NFCA Leadoff Classic)	W 11–0	12–3	
Feb 28	vs Northwestern*	Anderson Family Field • Fullerton, CA (Worth Tournament)	L 3–4	12–4	
Feb 28	at Cal State Fullerton*	Anderson Family Field • Fullerton, CA (Worth Tournament)	L 4–5	12–5	

March
Date	Opponent	Site/stadium	Score	Overall record	Pac-10 record
Mar 1	vs Ohio State*	Anderson Family Field • Fullerton, CA (Worth Tournament)	L 0–1	12–6	
Mar 1	vs Pacific*	Anderson Family Field • Fullerton, CA (Worth Tournament)	W 7–0	13–6	
Mar 2	vs Minnesota*	Anderson Family Field • Fullerton, CA (Worth Tournament)	W 7–0	14–6	
Mar 7	vs Minnesota*	Twin Creeks Sports Complex • Sunnyvale, CA (National Invitational Softball Tournament)	W 3–2	15–6	
Mar 7	vs Sacramento State*	Twin Creeks Sports Complex • Sunnyvale, CA (National Invitational Tournament)	W 4–0	16–6	
Mar 8	vs Georgia Tech*	Twin Creeks Sports Complex • Sunnyvale, CA (National Invitational Tournament)	W 1–0	17–6	
Mar 8	vs Arizona State*	Twin Creeks Sports Complex • Sunnyvale, CA (National Invitational Tournament)	W 6–1	18–6	
Mar 9	vs Oregon*	Twin Creeks Sports Complex • Sunnyvale, CA (National Invitational Tournament)	W 6–0	19–6	
Mar 14	vs Florida Atlantic*	Miami, FL (FIU Tournament)	W 10–2	20–6	
Mar 14	vs Syracuse*	Miami, FL (FIU Tournament)	W 8–0	21–6	
Mar 15	vs UMass*	Miami, FL (FIU Tournament)	W 6–4	22–6	
Mar 15	at FIU*	Miami, FL (FIU Tournament)	W 5–1	23–6	
Mar 20	vs Long Island*	Shea Stadium • Sacramento, CA (Sacramento Capital Classic)	W 9–0	24–6	
Mar 21	vs Eastern Kentucky*	Shea Stadium • Sacramento, CA (Sacramento Capital Classic)	W 9–0	25–6	
Mar 21	vs Utah State*	Shea Stadium • Sacramento, CA (Sacramento Capital Classic)	W 5–1	26–6	
Mar 22	vs UNLV*	Shea Stadium • Sacramento, CA (Sacramento Capital Classic)	W 1–0	27–6	
Mar 22	vs Iowa*	Shea Stadium • Sacramento, CA (Sacramento Capital Classic)	L 3–4	27–7	
Mar 26	UC Santa Barbara*	Levine-Fricke Field • Berkeley, CA	W 6–2	28–7	
Mar 28	Washington	Levine-Fricke Field • Berkeley, CA	W 2–0	29–7	1–0
Mar 29	UCLA	Levine-Fricke Field • Berkeley, CA	L 0–3	29–8	1–1
Mar 30	UCLA	Levine-Fricke Field • Berkeley, CA	L 1–4	29–9	1–2

April
Date	Opponent	Site/stadium	Score	Overall record	Pac-10 record
Apr 4	Oregon State	Levine-Fricke Field • Berkeley, CA	W 7–2	30–9	2–2
Apr 5	Oregon	Levine-Fricke Field • Berkeley, CA	W 4–0	31–9	3–2
Apr 6	Oregon	Levine-Fricke Field • Berkeley, CA	W 4–1	32–9	4–2
Apr 9	at Sacramento State*	Shea Stadium • Sacramento, CA	W 7–1	33–9	
Apr 9	at Sacramento State*	Shea Stadium • Sacramento, CA	W 4–1	34–9	
Apr 11	at Arizona State	Alberta B. Farrington Softball Stadium • Tempe, AZ	L 0–1	34–10	4–3
Apr 12	at Arizona	Rita Hillenbrand Memorial Stadium • Tucson, AZ	L 5–7	34–11	4–4
Apr 13	at Arizona	Rita Hillenbrand Memorial Stadium • Tucson, AZ	L 0–1	34–12	4–5
Apr 16	Santa Clara*	Levine-Fricke Field • Berkeley, CA	W 4–0	35–12	
Apr 18	at Stanford	Boyd & Jill Smith Family Stadium • Stanford, CA	W 2–1	36–12	5–5
Apr 19	Stanford	Levine-Fricke Field • Berkeley, CA	W 1–0	37–12	6–5
Apr 19	Stanford	Levine-Fricke Field • Berkeley, CA	W 2–1	38–12	7–5
Apr 25	at UCLA	Easton Stadium • Los Angeles, CA	L 0–10	38–13	7–6
Apr 26	at Washington	Husky Softball Stadium • Seattle, WA	W 1–0	39–13	8–6
Apr 27	at Washington	Husky Softball Stadium • Seattle, WA	L 2–5	39–14	8–7

May
Date	Opponent	Site/stadium	Score	Overall record	Pac-10 record
May 3	Arizona State	Levine-Fricke Field • Berkeley, CA	W 10–1	40–14	9–7
May 4	Arizona State	Levine-Fricke Field • Berkeley, CA	L 0–1	40–15	9–8
May 5	Arizona	Levine-Fricke Field • Berkeley, CA	L 0–6	40–16	9–9
May 9	at Oregon	Howe Field • Eugene, OR	L 1–9	40–17	9–10
May 10	at Oregon State	OSU Softball Complex • Corvallis, OR	L 3–5	40–18	9–11
May 10	at Oregon State	OSU Softball Complex • Corvallis, OR	W 6–2	41–18	10–11

Postseason

NCAA Ann Arbor Regional
Date	Opponent	Rank (Seed)	Site/stadium	Score	Overall record	Reg record
May 15	Oakland	No. 9	Alumni Field • Ann Arbor, MI	W 8–0	42–18	1–0
May 16	No. 14 Michigan	No. 9	Alumni Field • Ann Arbor, MI	W 9–0	43–18	2–0
May 17	No. 4 DePaul	No. 9	Alumni Field • Ann Arbor, MI	W 1–0	44–18	3–0
May 18	No. 14 Michigan	No. 9	Alumni Field • Ann Arbor, MI	W 1–0	45–18	4–0

NCAA Women's College World Series
Date	Opponent	Rank (Seed)	Site/stadium	Score	Overall record	WCWS Record
May 22	No. 2 (2) UCLA	No. 9 (7)	ASA Hall of Fame Stadium • Oklahoma City, OK	W 7–3^{10}	46–18	1–0
May 23	No. 3 (3) Texas	No. 9 (7)	ASA Hall of Fame Stadium • Oklahoma City, OK	L 0–1	46–19	1–1
June 1	No. 5 (4) Oklahoma	No. 9 (7)	ASA Hall of Fame Stadium • Oklahoma City, OK	W 5–2	47–19	2–1
June 1	No. 1 (1) Arizona	No. 9 (7)	ASA Hall of Fame Stadium • Oklahoma City, OK	W 2–1^{12}	48–19	3–1
June 2	No. 1 (1) Arizona	No. 9 (7)	ASA Hall of Fame Stadium • Oklahoma City, OK	W 4–1	49–19	4–1
June 3	No. 2 (2) UCLA	No. 9 (7)	ASA Hall of Fame Stadium • Oklahoma City, OK	L 0–1^{9}	49–20	4–2

== Ranking movements ==
Ranking movements Legend: ██ Increase in ranking ██ Decrease in ranking
	Week												
Poll	Pre	1	2	3	4	5	6	7	8	9	10	11	Final
NFCA/USA Today	3	4	6	8	7	6	7	7	6	10	9	9	2
