= Kristin Schmidt =

- Pitcher
- Born: April 3, 1982 (age 43); Houston, Texas, U.S.
- Bats: Right Throws: Right

Teams
- Notre Dame (2001); LSU (2002–2004)

Career highlights and awards
- Women's College World Series Most Outstanding Player (2004); All-SEC First team (2004)

Kristin Ann Schmidt (born April 3, 1982) is an American former softball player who played as a pitcher.

== Early life ==
Kristin Schmidt was born to Nancy and Robbie Schmidt in Houston, Texas and she majored in political science.

== Playing career ==
Kristin Schmidt started playing as a freshman for Notre Dame where she earned herself BIG EAST weekly pitching award. Then later she transferred to LSU. In 2003 she returned to the All-American second team where she pitched in four games in less than 24 hours and was named tournament MVP. she ranks second in LSU history in wins, strikeouts, saves, and shutouts. In 2004, she was known as the Flame-throwing durable pitcher and named the College World Series Most Outstanding Player.
