= 2004 NCAA Division I softball season =

College softball in the United States

- Defending Champions: UCLA

Tournament

Women's College World Series
- Champions: UCLA (11th (13th overall) title)
- Runners-up: California (9th WCWS Appearance)
- Winning Coach: Sue Enquist (7th title)
- WCWS MOP: Kristin Schmidt (LSU)

Seasons
- ← 2003 2005 →

The 2004 NCAA Division I softball season, play of college softball in the United States organized by the National Collegiate Athletic Association (NCAA) at the Division I level, began in January 2004. The season progressed through the regular season, many conference tournaments and championship series, and concluded with the 2004 NCAA Division I softball tournament and 2004 Women's College World Series. The Women's College World Series, consisting of the eight remaining teams in the NCAA Tournament and held in Oklahoma City at ASA Hall of Fame Stadium, ended on May 31, 2004.

== Conference standings ==
2004 Big 12 Conference softball standings
	Conf.						Overall
Team	W		L		T	PCT	W		L		T	PCT
No. 14 Nebraska ‍†‍‡‍^{y}	14	–	3	–	0	.824	45	–	17	–	0	.726
Texas A&M ‍‍‍^{y}	13	–	3	–	0	.813	33	–	22	–	0	.600
Missouri ‍‍‍^{y}	13	–	4	–	0	.765	29	–	26	–	0	.527
No. 18 Baylor ‍‍‍^{y}	11	–	6	–	0	.647	48	–	17	–	0	.738
No. 6 Oklahoma ‍‍‍^{y}	11	–	7	–	0	.611	45	–	22	–	1	.669
Oklahoma State ‍‍‍	7	–	10	–	0	.412	27	–	28	–	0	.491
Kansas ‍‍‍	7	–	11	–	0	.389	33	–	28	–	1	.540
Texas ‍‍‍	5	–	13	–	0	.278	24	–	25	–	0	.490
Iowa State ‍‍‍	3	–	13	–	0	.188	13	–	31	–	0	.295
Texas Tech ‍‍‍	2	–	16	–	0	.111	22	–	36	–	0	.379
† – Conference champion ‡ – Tournament champion y – Invited to the NCAA tournament Rankings from NFCA

2004 Big Ten Conference softball standings
	Conf.				Overall
Team	W		L	PCT	W		L	PCT
No. 9 Michigan ‍†‍‍^{y}	17	–	3	.850	54	–	11	.831
No. 17 Illinois ‍‍‍^{y}	14	–	6	.700	45	–	21	.682
Iowa ‍‍‍^{y}	14	–	6	.700	39	–	24	.619
Northwestern ‍‍‍^{y}	13	–	9	.591	34	–	20	.630
Minnesota ‍‍‍	10	–	10	.500	33	–	23	.589
Ohio State ‍‍‍^{y}	8	–	11	.421	35	–	25	.583
Michigan State ‍‍‡‍^{y}	8	–	12	.400	36	–	26	.581
Penn State ‍‍‍	8	–	12	.400	25	–	32	.439
Indiana ‍‍‍	7	–	13	.350	32	–	31	.508
Wisconsin ‍‍‍	6	–	14	.300	29	–	28	.509
Purdue ‍‍‍	5	–	14	.263	32	–	25	.561
† – Conference champion ‡ – Tournament champion y – Invited to the NCAA tournament As of May 24, 2004; Rankings from NFCA

2004 Pacific-10 Conference softball standings
	Conf.				Overall
Team	W		L	PCT	W		L	PCT
Arizona ‍†‍‍^{y}	17	–	3	.850	55	–	6	.902
California ‍‍‍^{y}	13	–	8	.619	53	–	13	.803
Stanford ‍‍‍^{y}	13	–	8	.619	49	–	19	.721
UCLA ‍‍‍^{y}	12	–	8	.600	47	–	9	.839
Washington ‍‍‍^{y}	10	–	10	.500	40	–	19	.678
Oregon ‍‍‍^{y}	10	–	11	.476	42	–	21	.667
Oregon State ‍‍‍^{y}	4	–	17	.190	44	–	28	.611
Arizona State ‍‍‍	3	–	17	.150	33	–	31	.516
† – Conference champion y – Invited to the NCAA tournament As of June 30, 2004; Rankings from Coaches' Poll

2004 Southland Conference softball standings
	Conf.						Overall
Team	W		L		T	PCT	W		L		T	PCT
Texas–San Antonio ‍†‍‍^{y}	20	–	6	–	0	.769	37	–	17	–	0	.685
Texas State ‍‍‍	19	–	7	–	0	.731	37	–	20	–	0	.649
Sam Houston State ‍‍‍	17	–	9	–	0	.654	29	–	23	–	0	.558
Texas–Arlington ‍‍‍	15	–	10	–	0	.600	24	–	24	–	1	.500
Northwestern State ‍‍‍	14	–	12	–	0	.538	35	–	28	–	0	.556
Nicholls State ‍‍‍	12	–	14	–	0	.462	24	–	29	–	0	.453
Southeastern Louisiana ‍‍‍	10	–	15	–	0	.400	23	–	25	–	0	.479
Stephen F. Austin ‍‍‍	10	–	15	–	0	.400	23	–	27	–	0	.460
McNeese State ‍‍‍	8	–	17	–	0	.320	19	–	41	–	0	.317
Louisiana–Monroe ‍‍‍	3	–	23	–	0	.115	13	–	48	–	0	.213
† – Conference champion y – Invited to the NCAA tournament As of May 20, 2004; Rankings from Coaches' Poll

== Women's College World Series ==
The 2004 NCAA Women's College World Series took place from May 27 to May 31, 2004 in Oklahoma City.

First round
6	Michigan	2
3	LSU	3^{13}
7	Stanford	2
2	UCLA	8
7	Stanford	5
6	Michigan	4
8	Washington	2
1	Oklahoma	6
5	California	4
4	Florida State	2
4	Florida State	2
8	Washington	0

Second round
2	UCLA	2
3	LSU	0
1	Oklahoma	2
7	Stanford	3
1	Oklahoma	1
5	California	2^{8}
3	LSU	2
4	Florida State	1

Semifinals
2	UCLA	3^{12}	—
7	Stanford	1	—
3	LSU	4	1
5	California	1	4

Finals
5	California	1
2	UCLA	3

== Season leaders ==
Batting

- Batting average: .488 – Autumn Champion, Arizona Wildcats
- RBIs: 82 – Holly Groves, South Florida Bulls
- Home runs: 24 – Caitlin Benyi, UCLA Bruins

Pitching

- Wins: 45-5 & 45-10 – Brooke Mitchell, Louisiana Ragin' Cajuns & Monica Abbott, Tennessee Volunteers
- ERA: 0.54 (20 ER/259.0 IP) – Jamie Southern, Fresno State Bulldogs
- Strikeouts: 582 – Monica Abbott, Tennessee Volunteers

== Records ==
NCAA Division I season triples: 17 – Dianna Korcak, Jacksonville Dolphins

NCAA Division I single game strikeouts: 28 – Cristin Vitek, Baylor Bears; May 20, 2004 (16 innings)

Freshman class 7 inning single game strikeouts: 20 – Monica Abbott, Tennessee Volunteers; March 26, 2004

Sophomore class consecutive wins streak: 32 – Alicia Hollowell, Arizona Wildcats; February 6-April 24, 2004

Freshman class wins: 45 – Monica Abbott, Tennessee Volunteers

Freshman class shutouts: 24 – Monica Abbott, Tennessee Volunteers

Freshman class strikeouts: 582 – Monica Abbott, Tennessee Volunteers

Team single game doubles: 13 – Charleston Cougars, February 11, 2004

== Awards ==
- USA Softball Collegiate Player of the Year:

Jessica van der Linden, Florida State Seminoles

- Honda Sports Award Softball:

Jessica van der Linden, Florida State Seminoles

YEAR	W	L	GP	GS	CG	SHO	SV	IP	H	R	ER	BB	SO	ERA	WHIP
2004	29	8	42	35	31	20	2	246.1	106	29	21	51	387	0.59	0.64

YEAR	G	AB	R	H	BA	RBI	HR	3B	2B	TB	SLG	BB	SO	SB	SBA
2004	73	197	49	79	.401	55	4	4	10	109	.553%	42	23	9	10

== All America Teams ==
The following players were members of the All-American Teams.

First Team

Position	Player	Class	School
P	Monica Abbott	FR.	Tennessee Lady Vols
P	Dana Sorensen	SR.	Stanford Cardinal
P	Alicia Hollowell	SO.	Arizona Wildcats
C	Kristen Rivera	JR.	Washington Huskies
1B	Kim Wendland	JR.	Georgia Bulldogs
2B	Caitlin Benyi	SO.	UCLA Bruins
3B	Vicky Galindo	JR.	California Golden Bears
SS	Christina Clark	SO.	Fresno State Bulldogs
OF	Nicole Barber	SR.	Georgia Bulldogs
OF	Iyhia McMichael	JR.	Mississippi State Bulldogs
OF	Caitlin Lowe	FR.	Arizona Wildcats
DP	Wendy Allen	SR.	Arizona Wildcats
UT	Jessica van der Linden	SR.	FSU Seminoles
AT-L	Gina Carbonatto	FR.	Pacific Tigers
AT-L	Autumn Champion	SO.	Arizona Wildcats
AT-L	Brooke Mitchell	JR.	ULL Ragin' Cajuns
AT-L	Heather Scaglione	JR.	Oklahoma State Cowgirls

Second Team

Position	Player	Class	School
P	Keira Goerl	SR.	UCLA Bruins
P	Casey Hunter	JR.	FSU Seminoles
P	Kristina Thorson	SO.	California Golden Bears
C	Jessica Allister	SR.	Stanford Cardinal
1B	Vanessa Iapala	SO.	Oregon State Beavers
2B	Veronica Wootson	FR.	FSU Seminoles
3B	Phelan Wright	SR.	Arizona State Sun Devils
SS	Jessica Merchant	JR.	Michigan Wolverines
OF	Kaleo Eldredge	JR.	California Golden Bears
OF	LaDonia Hughes	SR.	LSU Tigers
OF	Kristen Zaleski	SR.	Texas State Bobcats
DP	Holly Groves	SR.	USF Bulls
UT	Jessica Beech	SR.	Michigan State Spartans
AT-L	Peaches James	SR.	Nebraska Cornhuskers
AT-L	Lauren Lappin	SO.	Stanford Cardinal
AT-L	Nicole Motycka	JR.	Michigan Wolverines
AT-L	Kristin Schmidt	SR.	LSU Tigers

Third Team

Position	Player	Class	School
P	Jessica Kapchinski	SR.	Texas A&M Aggies
P	Kristen Keyes	SR.	Auburn Tigers
P	Jessica Sallinger	JR.	Georgia Tech Yellowjackets
C	Sara Dean	JR.	Auburn Tigers
1B	Saskia Roberson	JR.	DePaul Blue Demons
2B	Tiffany Haas	SO.	Michigan Wolverines
3B	Sara Larquier	SO.	Virginia Cavaliers
SS	Lauren May	JR.	Cornell Big Red
OF	Christen Bedwell	SR.	CSUN Matadors
OF	Megan Ciolli	JR.	Notre Dame Fighting Irish
OF	Leslie Klein	FR.	LSU Tigers
DP	Amanda Rivera	SR.	UIC Flames
UT	Sarah Martz	SR.	DePaul Blue Demons
AT-L	Leigh Ann Ellis	SR.	USF Bulls
AT-L	Dominique Lastrapes	FR.	Washington Huskies
AT-L	Jackie McClain	SR.	Alabama Crimson Tide
AT-L	Megan Meyer	JR.	Seton Hall Pirates
AT-L	Chelsea Spencer	JR.	California Golden Bears
