= 2003 NCAA Division I softball season =

American college softball season

- Defending Champions: California

Tournament

Women's College World Series
- Champions: UCLA (10th (12th overall) title)
- Runners-up: California (8th WCWS Appearance)
- Winning Coach: Sue Enquist (6th title)
- WCWS MOP: Keira Goerl (UCLA)

Seasons
- ← 2002 2004 →

The 2003 NCAA Division I softball season, play of college softball in the United States organized by the National Collegiate Athletic Association (NCAA) at the Division I level, began in January 2003. The season progressed through the regular season, many conference tournaments and championship series, and concluded with the 2003 NCAA Division I softball tournament and 2003 Women's College World Series. The Women's College World Series, consisting of the eight remaining teams in the NCAA Tournament and held in Oklahoma City at ASA Hall of Fame Stadium, ended on May 26, 2003.

== Conference standings ==
2003 Big 12 Conference softball standings
	Conf.				Overall
Team	W		L	PCT	W		L	PCT
No. 4 Texas ‍†‍‡‍^{y}	15	–	2	.882	49	–	9	.845
No. 14 Oklahoma State ‍‍‍^{y}	13	–	5	.722	39	–	15	.722
Missouri ‍‍‍^{y}	12	–	5	.706	31	–	20	.608
No. 5 Oklahoma ‍‍‍^{y}	12	–	6	.667	47	–	14	.770
No. 16 Texas A&M ‍‍‍^{y}	10	–	8	.556	38	–	22	.633
No. 13 Nebraska ‍‍‍^{y}	10	–	8	.556	39	–	17	.696
Iowa State ‍‍‍	6	–	12	.333	19	–	28	.404
Texas Tech ‍‍‍	4	–	14	.222	22	–	41	.349
Kansas ‍‍‍	4	–	14	.222	26	–	22	.542
Baylor ‍‍‍	3	–	15	.167	31	–	29	.517
† – Conference champion ‡ – Tournament champion y – Invited to the NCAA tournament Rankings from NFCA

2003 Big Ten Conference softball standings
	Conf.						Overall
Team	W		L		T	PCT	W		L		T	PCT
No. 16 Iowa ‍†‍‡‍^{y}	13	–	4	–	0	.765	55	–	15	–	0	.786
No. 12 Michigan ‍‍‍^{y}	13	–	5	–	0	.722	44	–	16	–	0	.733
No. 24 Michigan State ‍‍‍^{y}	13	–	6	–	0	.684	40	–	19	–	0	.678
Illinois ‍‍‍^{y}	11	–	7	–	0	.611	39	–	17	–	1	.693
Minnesota ‍‍‍^{y}	12	–	8	–	0	.600	37	–	21	–	1	.636
Northwestern ‍‍‍^{y}	11	–	9	–	0	.550	36	–	19	–	0	.655
Penn State ‍‍‍^{y}	9	–	9	–	0	.500	32	–	22	–	0	.593
Wisconsin ‍‍‍	7	–	13	–	0	.350	19	–	26	–	0	.422
Ohio State ‍‍‍	5	–	11	–	0	.313	26	–	23	–	0	.531
Purdue ‍‍‍	5	–	13	–	0	.278	34	–	27	–	0	.557
Indiana ‍‍‍	2	–	16	–	0	.111	19	–	31	–	0	.380
† – Conference champion ‡ – Tournament champion y – Invited to the NCAA tournament As of May 2003; Rankings from NFCA

2003 Pacific-10 Conference softball standings
	Conf.						Overall
Team	W		L		T	PCT	W		L		T	PCT
Arizona ‍†‍‍^{y}	19	–	2	–	0	.905	54	–	5	–	0	.915
UCLA ‍‍‍^{y}	17	–	4	–	0	.810	54	–	7	–	0	.885
California ‍‍‍^{y}	10	–	11	–	0	.476	49	–	20	–	0	.710
Oregon ‍‍‍^{y}	10	–	11	–	0	.476	37	–	19	–	0	.661
Washington ‍‍‍^{y}	9	–	12	–	0	.429	46	–	14	–	1	.762
Stanford ‍‍‍^{y}	7	–	14	–	0	.333	41	–	26	–	0	.612
Arizona State ‍‍‍^{y}	7	–	14	–	0	.333	32	–	35	–	0	.478
Oregon State ‍‍‍^{y}	5	–	16	–	0	.238	36	–	31	–	0	.537
† – Conference champion y – Invited to the NCAA tournament As of June 30, 2003; Rankings from Coaches' Poll

2003 Southland Conference softball standings
	Conf.						Overall
Team	W		L		T	PCT	W		L		T	PCT
Texas–Arlington ‍†‍‍^{y}	23	–	4	–	0	.852	41	–	17	–	0	.707
Southwest Texas State ‍‍‍	21	–	5	–	1	.796	46	–	18	–	1	.715
McNeese State ‍‍‍	15	–	11	–	1	.574	24	–	27	–	1	.471
Northwestern State ‍‍‍	14	–	13	–	0	.519	27	–	33	–	0	.450
Nicholls State ‍‍‍	13	–	14	–	0	.481	29	–	27	–	0	.518
Sam Houston State ‍‍‍	12	–	15	–	0	.444	24	–	33	–	0	.421
Stephen F. Austin ‍‍‍	11	–	16	–	0	.407	27	–	31	–	0	.466
Louisiana–Monroe ‍‍‍	9	–	17	–	0	.346	19	–	29	–	0	.396
Southeastern Louisiana ‍‍‍	8	–	18	–	0	.308	15	–	31	–	0	.326
Texas–San Antonio ‍‍‍	7	–	20	–	0	.259	15	–	40	–	0	.273
† – Conference champion y – Invited to the NCAA tournament As of May 20, 2003; Rankings from Coaches' Poll

== Women's College World Series ==
The 2003 NCAA Women's College World Series took place from May 22 to May 26, 2003 in Oklahoma City.

First round
1	Arizona	3
8	Alabama	2
4	Oklahoma	1
5	Washington	3
8	Alabama	3
4	Oklahoma	6^{9}
3	Texas	3
6	Louisiana–Lafayette	2
7	California	7^{10}
2	UCLA	3
6	Louisiana-Lafayette	1
2	UCLA	5

Second round
1	Arizona	2
5	Washington	1
4	Oklahoma	2
7	California	5
3	Texas	1
7	California	0
2	UCLA	2
5	Washington	1

Semifinals
1	Arizona	1	1
7	California	2^{12}	4
3	Texas	0	1
2	UCLA	3	2

Finals
7	California	0
2	UCLA	1^{9}

== Season leaders ==
Batting

- Batting average: .490 – Amber Jackson, Bethune–Cookman Wildcats
- RBIs: 79 – Lovieanne Jung, Arizona Wildcats
- Home runs: 25 – Lovieanne Jung, Arizona Wildcats & Kristen Rivera, Washington Huskies

Pitching

- Wins: 40-5 & 40-7 – Alicia Hollowell, Arizona Wildcats & Keira Goerl, UCLA Bruins
- ERA: 0.37 (13 ER/242.2 IP) – Cat Osterman, Texas Longhorns
- Strikeouts: 488 – Cat Osterman, Texas Longhorns

== Records ==
Sophomore class single game RBIs: 11 – Stephanie Best, UCF Knights & Jackie Coburn, Arizona Wildcats; March 19 & May 10, 2003

Sophomore class strikeout ratio: 14.1 (488 SO/242.2 IP) – Cat Osterman, Texas Longhorns

Senior class walks: 107 – Veronica Nelson, California Golden Bears

== Awards ==
- USA Softball Collegiate Player of the Year:

Cat Osterman, Texas Longhorns

YEAR	W	L	GP	GS	CG	SHO	SV	IP	H	R	ER	BB	SO	ERA	WHIP
2003	32	6	40	36	27	18	0	242.2	72	18	13	39	488	0.37	0.46

- Honda Sports Award Collegiate Woman Athlete of The Year:

Natasha Watley, UCLA Bruins

- Honda Sports Award Softball:

Natasha Watley, UCLA Bruins

YEAR	G	AB	R	H	BA	RBI	HR	3B	2B	TB	SLG	BB	SO	SB	SBA
2003	61	212	64	102	.481	53	10	5	12	154	.726%	22	14	35	44

== All America Teams ==
The following players were members of the All-American Teams.

First Team

Position	Player	Class	School
P	Cat Osterman	SO.	Texas Longhorns
P	Keira Goerl	JR.	UCLA Bruins
P	Alicia Hollowell	FR.	Arizona Wildcats
C	Kristen Rivera	SO.	Washington Huskies
1B	Stacey Porter	JR.	Hawaii Rainbow Wahine
2B	Andrea Hillsey	SO.	Purdue Boilermakers
3B	Leah Gulla	SR.	Oklahoma Sooners
SS	Natasha Watley	SR.	UCLA Bruins
OF	Oli Keohohou	JR.	BYU Cougars
OF	Iyhia McMichael	JR.	Mississippi State Bulldogs
OF	Autumn Champion	FR.	Arizona Wildcats
DP	Claire Sua	JR.	UCLA Bruins
UT	Tairia Flowers	SR.	UCLA Bruins
AT-L	Lovieanne Jung	SR.	Arizona Wildcats
AT-L	Lindsay Chouinard	SR.	DePaul Blue Demons
AT-L	Lauren Bay-Regula	SR.	Oklahoma State Cowgirls
AT-L	Jessica van der Linden	JR.	FSU Seminoles
AT-L	Jenny Topping	SR.	Cal State Fullerton Titans

Second Team

Position	Player	Class	School
P	Michelle Green	SO.	Georgia Bulldogs
P	Kami Keiter	SO.	Oklahoma Sooners
P	Tia Bollinger	JR.	Washington Huskies
C	Jami Trinidad	SR.	UC Santa Barbara Gauchos
1B	Veronica Nelson	SR.	California Golden Bears
2B	Brandi Stuart	SR.	FSU Seminoles
3B	Phelan Wright	JR.	Arizona State Sun Devils
SS	Kristin Johnson	SR.	Iowa Hawkeyes
OF	Courtney Fossatti	JR.	Arizona Wildcats
OF	Nicole Barber	JR.	Georgia Bulldogs
OF	Kristen Zaleski	JR.	Texas State Bobcats
DP	Lai-Kia Fennell	SO.	CSUN Matadors
UT	Marissa Young	SR.	Michigan Wolverines
AT-L	Christina Clark	FR.	Fresno State Bulldogs
AT-L	Jamie Southern	SO.	Fresno State Bulldogs
AT-L	Jackie McClain	JR.	Alabama Crimson Tide
AT-L	Becky McMurtry	SR.	ULL Ragin' Cajuns
AT-L	Courtney Scott	SR.	California Golden Bears

Third Team

Position	Player	Class	School
P	Jodie Cox	SR.	Cal State Fullerton Titans
P	Jessica Beech	JR.	Michigan State Spartans
P	Lisa Birocci	SO.	Iowa Hawkeyes
P	Kristin Schmidt	JR.	LSU Tigers
C	Elisa Velasco	JR.	FSU Seminoles
1B	Jaclyn Holden	FR.	North Carolina Tar Heels
2B	Brynnen Guthrie	SR.	Oregon State Beavers
3B	Andrea Loman	SR.	Notre Dame Fighting Irish
SS	Emily Robustelli	SR.	UMass Minutewomen
OF	Catalina Morris	FR.	Stanford Cardinal
OF	Tiffany Tolleson	SR.	North Carolina Tar Heels
OF	Danyele Gomez	FR.	ULL Ragin' Cajuns
DP	Saskia Roberson	SO.	DePaul Blue Demons
UT	Sarah Martz	JR.	DePaul Blue Demons
AT-L	Andrea Vidlund	SR.	Oregon Ducks
AT-L	Rachael McGinnis	JR.	Missouri Tigers
AT-L	Sandy Lewis	SR.	Michigan State Spartans
AT-L	Amanda Hallaway	SR.	Hofstra Pride
AT-L	Rosette Rough	SR.	Long Island Sharks
AT-L	Gina Oaks	SR.	Cal State Fullerton Titans
