= 2004 NCAA Division I softball tournament =

- Teams: 64
- Finals site: ASA Hall of Fame Stadium; Oklahoma City, Oklahoma
- Champions: UCLA (11th (12th overall) title)
- Runner-up: California (10th WCWS Appearance)
- Winning coach: Sue Enquist (6th title)
- MOP: Kristin Schmidt (LSU)

The 2004 NCAA Division I softball tournament was the twenty-third annual tournament to determine the national champion of NCAA women's collegiate softball. Held during May 2004, sixty-four Division I college softball teams contested the championship. The tournament featured eight regionals of eight teams, each in a double elimination format. The 2004 Women's College World Series was held in Oklahoma City, Oklahoma from May 27 through May 31 and marked the conclusion of the 2004 NCAA Division I softball season. UCLA won their eleventh (Note: The NCAA Record Book shows 2004 as UCLA's tenth championship, as their 1995 title was vacated.) NCAA championship and twelfth overall by defeating California 3–1 in the final game. LSU pitcher Kristin Schmidt was named Women's College World Series Most Outstanding Player.

== Regionals ==
=== Regional No. 1 (Tucson, AZ) ===
Upper round 1	Upper round 2	Upper final	Final
Northwestern	8
UC Santa Barbara	1
Northwestern	0
Oklahoma	8^{6}
Oklahoma	5
Temple	0
Oklahoma	3
Arizona	2
Louisiana–Lafayette	1
South Carolina	0
Louisiana–Lafayette	0
Arizona	4
Arizona	2
Centenary	1	Oklahoma	4	15^{5}
Louisiana–Lafayette	12	0
Lower round 1	Lower round 2	Lower round 3	Lower final
Louisiana–Lafayette	8
UC Santa Barbara	0	Temple	1	Arizona	0
Temple	3	Louisiana–Lafayette	3	Louisiana–Lafayette	5
Northwestern	0
Northwestern	5^{8}
South Carolina	8	South Carolina	3
Centenary	3

=== Regional No. 2 (Los Angeles, CA) ===
Upper round 1	Upper round 2	Upper final	Final
Cornell	2
Long Beach State	1
Cornell	0
Alabama	10^{5}
Alabama	4
Central Michigan	2
Alabama	2
UCLA	5^{9}
Louisville	1^{8}
Missouri	0
Louisville	0
UCLA	2
UCLA	8^{5}
Mississippi Valley State	0	UCLA	7	—
Alabama	0	—
Lower round 1	Lower round 2	Lower round 3	Lower final
Louisville	2
Long Beach State	3^{9}	Long Beach State	3	Alabama	7
Central Michigan	2	Long Beach State	5	Long Beach State	6
Mississippi Valley State	0
Cornell	3
Missouri	3	Mississippi Valley State	6
Mississippi Valley State	4

=== Regional No. 3 (Waco, TX) ===
Upper round 1	Upper round 2	Upper final	Final
Baylor	1^{16}
North Carolina	0
Baylor	5
Illinois	0
Illinois	3
UTSA	0
Baylor	3
LSU	7^{10}
Seton Hall	4
Houston	2
Seton Hall	0
LSU	3
LSU	4
Texas A&M–Corpus Christi	0	LSU	4	—
Illinois	1	—
Lower round 1	Lower round 2	Lower round 3	Lower final
Seton Hall	1^{12}
North Carolina	4	North Carolina	0	Baylor	0
UTSA	0	Seton Hall	0	Illinois	4
Illinois	2
Illinois	3
Houston	1	Houston	2
Texas A&M–Corpus Christi	0

=== Regional No. 4 (Tallahassee, FL) ===
Upper round 1	Upper round 2	Upper final	Final
South Florida	2
Ohio State	0
South Florida	0
Oregon	12^{5}
Oregon	1
Bethune–Cookman	0
Oregon	4
Florida State	5^{12}
Cal State Northridge	2
Florida	1
Cal State Northridge	0
Florida State	1
Florida State	4
LIU Brooklyn	0	Florida State	0	2
Oregon	1	0
Lower round 1	Lower round 2	Lower round 3	Lower final
Cal State Northridge	4
Ohio State	2^{10}	Ohio State	2	Oregon	2
Bethune–Cookman	0	Cal State Northridge	3	South Florida	1
South Florida	7
South Florida	8
Florida	4	Florida	1
LIU Brooklyn	0

=== Regional No. 5 (Lincoln, NE) ===
Upper round 1	Upper round 2	Upper final	Final
Creighton	6
Florida Atlantic	2
Creighton	0
Nebraska	2
Nebraska	6
Lehigh	0
Nebraska	0
California	2
Mississippi State	2^{8}
Iowa	1
Mississippi State	1
California	2
California	4
Maine	0	California	2	—
Nebraska	0	—
Lower round 1	Lower round 2	Lower round 3	Lower final
Mississippi State	0
Florida Atlantic	3	Florida Atlantic	1	Nebraska	3
Lehigh	0	Florida Atlantic	0	Creighton	1
Creighton	1
Creighton	8^{10}
Iowa	2	Iowa	4
Maine	0

=== Regional No. 6 (Ann Arbor, MI) ===
Upper round 1	Upper round 2	Upper final	Final
Oregon State	7
Bowling Green	0
Oregon State	4
Tennessee	0
Tennessee	10^{5}
UIC	0
Oregon State	0
Michigan	3
Notre Dame	8
DePaul	6
Notre Dame	0
Michigan	1
Michigan	6
Canisius	3	Michigan	0	5
Oregon State	1	2
Lower round 1	Lower round 2	Lower round 3	Lower final
Notre Dame	1
Bowling Green	1	UIC	2	Oregon State	6
UIC	2^{8}	UIC	6	UIC	5
Tennessee	5
Tennessee	4
DePaul	8^{5}	DePaul	0
Canisius	0

=== Regional No. 7 (Stanford, CA) ===
Upper round 1	Upper round 2	Upper final	Final
Southern Illinois	2
Fresno State	0
Southern Illinois	0
Hofstra	1^{12}
Hofstra	1^{9}
Auburn	0
Hofstra	1
Stanford	7
Pacific	10^{6}
Southern Miss	2
Pacific	2
Stanford	7
Stanford	1
Utah	0	Stanford	0	3
Hofstra	1	1
Lower round 1	Lower round 2	Lower round 3	Lower final
Pacific	6
Fresno State	3^{10}	Fresno State	1	Hofstra	3
Auburn	1	Pacific	0	Southern Illinois	1
Southern Illinois	1
Southern Illinois	4
Southern Miss	13	Southern Miss	1
Utah	5

=== Regional No. 8 (Athens, GA) ===
Upper round 1	Upper round 2	Upper final	Final
Georgia Tech	1
UMass	0
Georgia Tech	3
Georgia	2
Georgia	10^{5}
Eastern Kentucky	0
Georgia Tech	0
Washington	2
Michigan State	5
Texas A&M	1
Michigan State	8
Washington	12
Washington	4
Chattanooga	1	Washington	3	—
Georgia	1	—
Lower round 1	Lower round 2	Lower round 3	Lower final
Michigan State	13^{6}
UMass	4	UMass	2	Georgia Tech	1
Eastern Kentucky	1	Michigan State	1	Georgia	9^{6}
Georgia	9^{5}
Georgia	5
Texas A&M	6	Texas A&M	1
Chattanooga	0

== Women's College World Series ==
=== Participants ===
School	Conference	Record	Head coach	WCWS appearances† (Including 2004 WCWS)
California	Pac-10	50-11	Diane Ninemire	9
Florida State	ACC	61-9	JoAnne Graf	7
LSU	SEC	54-10	Yvette Girouard	2
Michigan	Big Ten	53-11	Carol Hutchins	7
Oklahoma	Big 12	44-19-1	Patty Gasso	5
Stanford	Pac-10	47-16	John Rittman	2
UCLA	Pac-10	43-9	Sue Enquist	21*
Washington	Pac-10	39-17	Scott Centala, Steve Dailey	7

*: Excludes UCLA's vacated 1995 WCWS participation.

†: Excludes results of the pre-NCAA Women's College World Series of 1969 through 1981.

=== Bracket ===
==== Bracket ====
First round
6	Michigan	2
3	LSU	3^{13}
7	Stanford	2
2	UCLA	8
7	Stanford	5
6	Michigan	4
8	Washington	2
1	Oklahoma	6
5	California	4
4	Florida State	2
4	Florida State	2
8	Washington	0

Second round
2	UCLA	2
3	LSU	0
1	Oklahoma	2
7	Stanford	3
1	Oklahoma	1
5	California	2^{8}
3	LSU	2
4	Florida State	1

Semifinals
2	UCLA	3^{12}	—
7	Stanford	1	—
3	LSU	4	1
5	California	1	4

Finals
5	California	1
2	UCLA	3

==== Game results ====
Date	Game	Winner	Score	Loser	Notes
5/27/2004	Game 01	LSU	3 - 2	Michigan	13 Innings
5/27/2004	Game 02	UCLA	8 - 2	Stanford	
5/27/2004	Game 03	Oklahoma	6 - 2	Washington	
5/27/2004	Game 04	California	4 - 2	Florida State	
5/28/2004	Game 05	UCLA	2 - 0	LSU	
5/28/2004	Game 06	California	2 - 1	Oklahoma	8 Innings
5/29/2004	Game 07	Stanford	5 - 4	Michigan	Michigan eliminated
5/29/2004	Game 08	Florida State	2 - 0	Washington	Washington eliminated
5/29/2004	Game 09	Stanford	3 - 2	Oklahoma	Oklahoma eliminated
5/29/2004	Game 10	LSU	2 - 1	Florida State	Florida State eliminated
5/30/2004	Game 11	UCLA	3 - 1	Stanford	12 Innings. Stanford eliminated If Necessary Game (Game 13) not necessary
5/30/2004	Game 12	LSU	4 - 1	California	LSU forces the If Necessary Game (Game 14)
5/30/2004	Game 13	--	--	--	Stanford / UCLA If Necessary game (Game 13) not necessary
5/30/2004	Game 14	California	4 - 1	LSU	LSU eliminated
5/31/2004	Championship game	UCLA	3 - 1	California	UCLA Wins 2004 WCWS

==== Championship game ====
School	Top Batter	Stats.
UCLA	Kristen Dedmon (PH)	1-1 2RBIs
California	Jessica Pamanian (2B)	1-3 RBI

School	Pitcher	IP	H	R	ER	BB	SO	AB	BF
UCLA	Keira Goerl (W)	7.0	7	1	1	3	4	27	31
California	Kelly Anderson (L)	5.0	1	3	3	1	5	16	18
California	Kristina Thorson	1.0	1	0	0	0	1	3	4

=== All-Tournament Team ===
The following players were members of the All-Tournament Team:

Position	Player	Class	School
Pitcher	Kelly Anderson	Junior	California
Pitcher	Keira Goerl	Senior	UCLA
Pitcher	Jessica van der Linden	Senior	Florida State
1st Base	Christina Enea	Junior	Oklahoma
2nd Base	Caitlin Benyi	Sophomore	UCLA
2nd Base	Jessica Pamanian	Junior	California
Shortstop	Lauren Lappin	Sophomore	Stanford
Shortstop	Jodie Legaspi	Freshman	UCLA
3rd Base	Vicky Galindo	Junior	California
Outfield	Lisa Dodd	Freshman	UCLA
Outfield	Camille Harris	Sophomore	LSU
Most Outstanding Player	Kristin Schmidt	Senior	LSU
