= 2003 NCAA Division I softball tournament =

- Teams: 64
- Finals site: ASA Hall of Fame Stadium; Oklahoma City, Oklahoma
- Champions: UCLA (10th (11th overall) title)
- Runner-up: California (9th WCWS Appearance)
- Winning coach: Sue Enquist (5th title)
- MOP: Keira Goerl (UCLA)

The 2003 NCAA Division I softball tournament was the twenty-second annual tournament to determine the national champion of NCAA women's collegiate softball. Held during May 2003, sixty-four Division I college softball teams contested the championship. The tournament featured eight regionals of eight teams, each in a double elimination format. The 2003 Women's College World Series was held in Oklahoma City, Oklahoma from May 22 through May 25 and marked the conclusion of the 2003 NCAA Division I softball season. UCLA won their tenth (Note: The NCAA Record Book shows 2003 as UCLA's ninth championship, as their 1995 title was vacated.) NCAA championship and eleventh overall by defeating California 1–0 in the final game. UCLA pitcher Keira Goerl, who threw a no-hitter in the final game, was named Women's College World Series Most Outstanding Player.

== Regionals ==
=== Regional No. 1 (Tucson, AZ) ===
Opening Round

Upper round 1	Upper round 2	Upper final	Final
Minnesota	3
Cal State Northridge	0
Minnesota	0
Arizona	4
Arizona	11^{5}
Colorado State	1
Arizona	4
Texas A&M	0
Texas A&M	8
Boston College	4
Texas A&M	5
South Carolina	0
South Carolina	8
Princeton	7	Arizona	10	—
Texas A&M	5	—
Lower round 1	Lower round 2	Lower round 3	Lower final
South Carolina	5
Cal State Northridge	7	Cal State Northridge	3	Texas A&M	6
Colorado State	4	South Carolina	5	South Carolina	3
Boston College	2
Minnesota	2
Boston College	6	Boston College	4
Princeton	0

=== Regional No. 2 (Fresno, CA) ===
Upper round 1	Upper round 2	Upper final	Final
Fresno State	3
Long Beach State	0
Fresno State	0
UCLA	3
UCLA	8^{6}
Colgate	0
UCLA	6
Michigan State	2
Michigan State	9^{5}
North Carolina	1
Michigan State	4
Georgia	3
Georgia	5
LIU Brooklyn	1	UCLA	5	—
Michigan State	0	—
Lower round 1	Lower round 2	Lower round 3	Lower final
Georgia	2
Long Beach State	1	Long Beach State	1	Michigan State	2
Colgate	0	Georgia	Fresno State	0
Fresno State	1^{8}
Fresno State	2
North Carolina	10^{5}	North Carolina	0
LIU Brooklyn	2

=== Regional No. 3 (Austin, TX) ===
Upper round 1	Upper round 2	Upper final	Final
LSU	9
Hawaii	4
LSU	0
Texas	8^{6}
Texas	4
Texas A&M–Corpus Christi	0
Texas	3
Texas State	0
Texas State	1
Arizona State	0
Texas State	3
Northwestern	1
Northwestern	2
Tennessee Tech	1	Texas	6	—
Texas State	0	—
Lower round 1	Lower round 2	Lower round 3	Lower final
Northwestern	0
Hawaii	2	Hawaii	1^{11}	Texas State	2
Texas A&M–Corpus Christi	0	Hawaii	4	Hawaii	1
Arizona State	2
LSU	1
Arizona State	6	Arizona State	4
Tennessee Tech	0

=== Regional No. 4 (Gainesville, FL) ===
Upper round 1	Upper round 2	Upper final	Final
South Florida	7
Florida Atlantic	3
South Florida	0
Oklahoma	8^{6}
Oklahoma	5
Bethune–Cookman	1
Oklahoma	6
Texas–Arlington	2
Florida	3
Oregon State	2
Florida	0
Texas–Arlington	2
Texas–Arlington	1
Florida State	0	Oklahoma	7	—
Oregon State	2	—
Lower round 1	Lower round 2	Lower round 3	Lower final
Florida	1
Florida Atlantic	2^{11}	Florida Atlantic	2	Texas–Arlington	0
Bethune–Cookman	1	Florida Atlantic	3	Oregon State	2
Oregon State	7
South Florida	0
Oregon State	2	Oregon State	8^{5}
Florida State	1

=== Regional No. 5 (Lincoln, NE) ===
Upper round 1	Upper round 2	Upper final	Final
Mississippi State	4
FIU	2
Mississippi State	0
Washington	8
Washington	5
Creighton	1
Washington	11
Iowa	0
Iowa	5
Pacific	0
Iowa	3
Hofstra	0
Hofstra	3
Nebraska	1	Washington	11^{5}	—
Iowa	0	—
Lower round 1	Lower round 2	Lower round 3	Lower final
Hofstra	1^{9}
FIU	1	Creighton	0	Iowa	2
Creighton	3	Hofstra	0	Nebraska	1
Nebraska	6
Mississippi State	0
Pacific	7	Nebraska	8^{6}
Nebraska	11

=== Regional No. 6 (Fullerton, CA) ===
Upper round 1	Upper round 2	Upper final	Final
Louisiana–Lafayette	6
San Diego State	0
Louisiana–Lafayette	1
Cal State Fullerton	0
Cal State Fullerton	3
Rider	0
Louisiana–Lafayette	1
Oklahoma State	0
Oregon	10
Penn State	8
Oregon	1
Oklahoma State	2
Oklahoma State	1
Boston University	0	Louisiana–Lafayette	2	6
Oregon	9	4
Lower round 1	Lower round 2	Lower round 3	Lower final
Oregon	4
San Diego State	2	San Diego State	1	Oklahoma State	6
Rider	1	Oregon	2	Oregon	7^{12}
Cal State Fullerton	1
Cal State Fullerton	8^{6}
Penn State	7	Penn State	0
Boston University	0

=== Regional No. 7 (Ann Arbor, MI) ===
Upper round 1	Upper round 2	Upper final	Final
Notre Dame	4
Missouri	3
Notre Dame	1
DePaul	4
DePaul	8^{5}
Wright State	0
DePaul	0
California	1
Michigan	8^{5}
Western Michigan	0
Michigan	0
California	9^{5}
California	8^{6}
Oakland	0	California	1	—
Michigan	0	—
Lower round 1	Lower round 2	Lower round 3	Lower final
Michigan	13^{5}
Missouri	1	Wright State	0	DePaul	2
Wright State	3	Michigan	5	Michigan	3
Notre Dame	3
Notre Dame	5
Western Michigan	3	Oakland	0
Oakland	4

=== Regional No. 8 (Tuscaloosa, AL) ===
Upper round 1	Upper round 2	Upper final	Final
Illinois	5
Georgia Tech	3
Illinois	2
Alabama	4
Alabama	10^{5}
Southern	1
Alabama	7
Southern Illinois	4
Southern Illinois	5
UMass	2
Southern Illinois	6
Stanford	1
Stanford	2
Chattanooga	0	Alabama	2	—
Southern Illinois	0	—
Lower round 1	Lower round 2	Lower round 3	Lower final
Stanford	0
Georgia Tech	9^{5}	Georgia Tech	1	Southern Illinois	6
Southern	0	Georgia Tech	0	UMass	1
UMass	2
Illinois	4
UMass	3	UMass	5
Chattanooga	2

== Women's College World Series ==
=== Participants ===
School	Conference	Record	Head coach	WCWS appearances† (Including 2003 WCWS)
Arizona	Pac-10	56-7	Mike Candrea	16
Alabama	SEC	49-21	Patrick Murphy	2
California	Pac-10	49-20	Diane Ninemire	9
Louisiana–Lafayette	Sun Belt	47-11	Michael Lotief	4
Oklahoma	Big 12	47-14	Patty Gasso	4
Texas	Big 12	47-9	Connie Clark	2
UCLA	Pac-10	53-7	Sue Enquist	20*
Washington	Pac-10	47-16-1	Teresa Wilson	6

*: Excludes UCLA's vacated 1995 WCWS participation.

†: Excludes results of the pre-NCAA Women's College World Series of 1969 through 1981.

=== Bracket ===
First round
1	Arizona	3
8	Alabama	2
4	Oklahoma	1
5	Washington	3
8	Alabama	3
4	Oklahoma	6^{9}
3	Texas	3
6	Louisiana–Lafayette	2
7	California	7^{10}
2	UCLA	3
6	Louisiana-Lafayette	1
2	UCLA	5

Second round
1	Arizona	2
5	Washington	1
4	Oklahoma	2
7	California	5
3	Texas	1
7	California	0
2	UCLA	2
5	Washington	1

Semifinals
1	Arizona	1	1
7	California	2^{12}	4
3	Texas	0	1
2	UCLA	3	2

Finals
7	California	0
2	UCLA	1^{9}

==== Game results ====
Date	Game	Winner	Score	Loser	Notes
5/22/2003	Game 01	Arizona	3 - 2	Alabama	
5/22/2003	Game 02	Washington	3 - 1	Oklahoma	
5/22/2003	Game 03	Texas	3 - 2	Louisiana-Lafayette	
5/22/2003	Game 04	California	7 - 3	UCLA	10 Innings
5/23/2003	Game 05	Arizona	2 - 1	Washington	
5/23/2003	Game 06	Texas	1 - 0	California	
5/24/2003	Game 07	Oklahoma	6 - 3	Alabama	9 Innings Alabama eliminated
5/24/2003	Game 08	UCLA	5 - 1	Louisiana-Lafayette	Louisiana-Lafayette eliminated
5/24/2003	Game 09	California	5 - 2	Oklahoma	Oklahoma eliminated
5/24/2003	Game 10	UCLA	2 - 1	Washington	Washington eliminated
5/25/2003	Game 11	California	2 - 1	Arizona	12 Innings. California forces the If Necessary Game (Game 13), and will be designated as the visiting team for that game.
5/25/2003	Game 12	UCLA	3 - 0	Texas	UCLA forces the If Necessary Game (Game 14), and will be designated as the visiting team for that game.
5/25/2003	Game 13	California	4 - 1	Arizona	Arizona eliminated
5/25/2003	Game 14	UCLA	2 - 1	Texas	Texas eliminated
5/26/2003	Championship game	UCLA	1 - 0	California	9 Innings UCLA Wins 2003 WCWS

==== Championship game ====
School	Top Batter	Stats.
UCLA	Toria Auelua (DP)	2-4 RBI K
California	Veronica Nelson (1B)	3BBs

School	Pitcher	IP	H	R	ER	BB	SO	AB	BF
UCLA	Keira Goerl (W)	9.0	0	0	0	4	4	27	32
California	Kelly Anderson (L)	9.0	6	1	1	4	5	31	37

=== All-Tournament Team ===
The following players were members of the All-Tournament Team:

Position	Player	Class	School
Pitcher	Kelly Anderson	Sophomore	California
Pitcher	Alicia Hollowell	Freshman	Arizona
Pitcher	Cat Osterman	Sophomore	Texas
1st Base	Veronica Nelson	Senior	California
Shortstop	Lovie Jung	Senior	Arizona
Shortstop	Chelsea Spencer	Sophomore	California
Shortstop	Natasha Watley	Senior	UCLA
3rd Base	Vicky Galindo	Sophomore	California
3rd Base	Tairia Mims	Senior	UCLA
Outfield	Tamara Poppe	Junior	Texas
Designated Player	Jennifer Stump	Senior	Oklahoma
Most Outstanding Player	Keira Goerl	Junior	UCLA
