= Michigan State Spartans softball =

- Founded: 1972
- University: Michigan State University
- Head coach: Sharonda McDonald-Kelley (4th season)
- Conference: Big Ten
- Location: East Lansing, Michigan, US
- Home stadium: Secchia Stadium (capacity: 1,100)
- Nickname: Spartans
- Colors: Green and white

AIAW Tournament champions
- 1976

AIAW WCWS appearances
- 1973, 1974, 1975, 1976, 1977, 1981

NCAA Tournament appearances
- 1997, 1999, 2003, 2004

Conference tournament championships
- 2004

The Michigan State Spartans softball team represents Michigan State University in NCAA Division I college softball. The team participates in the Big Ten Conference. The Spartans are currently led by head coach Sharonda McDonald-Kelley. The team plays its home games at Secchia Stadium located on the university's campus.

== History ==
=== Coaching history ===
Years	Coach	Record	%
1972–1973	Anne Irwin	19–9–1	.672
1974–1975	Margo Snively	36–14–1	.716
1976–1979	Dianne Ulibarri	91–53	.632
1980–1993	Gloria Becksford	259–408–4	.389
1994–2022	Jacquie Joseph	752–811–1	.481
2023–Present	Sharonda McDonald-Kelley	68–125–0	.352

== Championships ==
=== AIAW Women's College World Series National Championships ===
Season	Record	Head coach
1976	24–4	Dianne Ulibarri

=== Conference tournament championships ===
Year	Conference	Tournament Location	Head coach
2004	Big Ten Conference	Ann Arbor, MI	Jacquie Joseph

== Coaching staff ==
Name	Position coached	Consecutive season at Michigan State in current position
Sharonda McDonald-Kelley	Head coach	4th
Bethaney Wells	Hitting coach	3rd
Danielle Stenger	Pitching coach	4th
Annie Smith	Volunteer Assistant Coach	1st
Justin Rickert	Director of Operations	4th
Keegan Warner	Athletic Trainer	
Casey Akenberger	Strength & Conditioning Coach	6th
Melissa Tallant	Academic coordinator	

== Awards ==
Big Ten Coach of the Year

- Gloria Becksford, 1986
- Jacquie Joseph, 2003
