= 2008 Arizona Wildcats softball team =

American college softball season

2008 Arizona Wildcats softball

NCAA Tucson Super Regional champion NCAA Hempstead Regional champion

Women's College World Series, 0–2
- Conference: Pacific-10 Conference
- Record: 41–19 (13–8 Pac-10)
- Head coach: Larry Ray (17th season)
- Home stadium: Rita Hillenbrand Memorial Stadium

2008 Pacific-10 Conference softball standings
	Conf.						Overall
Team	W		L		T	PCT	W		L		T	PCT
Arizona State ‍†‍‍^{y}	18	–	3	–	0	.857	66	–	5	–	0	.930
UCLA ‍‍‍^{y}	17	–	4	–	0	.810	51	–	9	–	0	.850
Arizona ‍‍‍^{y}	13	–	8	–	0	.619	41	–	19	–	0	.683
Stanford ‍‍‍^{y}	11	–	10	–	0	.524	49	–	15	–	0	.766
California ‍‍‍^{y}	7	–	14	–	0	.333	43	–	27	–	0	.614
Washington ‍‍‍^{y}	7	–	14	–	0	.333	30	–	25	–	1	.545
Oregon State ‍‍‍	6	–	15	–	0	.286	28	–	31	–	0	.475
Oregon ‍‍‍^{y}	5	–	16	–	0	.238	35	–	29	–	0	.547
† – Conference champion y – Invited to the NCAA tournament As of July 30, 2008; Rankings from Coaches' Poll

The 2008 Arizona Wildcats softball team represented the University of Arizona in the 2008 NCAA Division I softball season. The Wildcats were coached by Larry Ray, who led the team as interim coach while Mike Candrea coached the United States women's national softball team. The Wildcats finished with a record of 41–19. They competed in the Pacific-10 Conference, where they finished third with a 13–8 record.

The Wildcats were invited to the 2008 NCAA Division I softball tournament, where they won the Hempstead Regional and Tucson Super Regional and advanced to the Women's College World Series. They finished tied for seventh place with losses to fifth place UCLA and semifinalists Alabama.

== Personnel ==
=== Roster ===
2008 Arizona Wildcats roster
Pitchers: 9 - Taryne Mowatt - Senior; 11 - Jennifer Martinez - Senior; 28 - Lindsey Sisk - Freshman; Catchers: 15 - Callista Balko - Senior; 21 - Stacie Chambers - Freshman	Infielders: 3 - Sarah Akamine - Sophomore; 7 - K’Lee Arredondo - Sophomore; 12 - Danielle Rodriguez - Senior; 17 - Victoria Kemp - Freshman; 24 - Laine Roth - Junior; 25 - Corinna Gonzalez - Freshman; 31 - Jenae Leles - Junior; 33 - Sam Banister - Junior	Outfielders: 2 - Cyndi Duran - Senior; 4 - Adrienne Acton - Senior; 6 - Jill Malina - Junior; 19 - Jessica McNamara - Junior; 22 - Lauren Schutzler - Freshman; 35 - Brittany Lastrapes - Freshman

=== Coaches ===
2008 Arizona Wildcats softball coaching staff
- Larry Ray - Interim head coach - 17th season
- Dave Feinberg - Assistant coach - 1st season

== Schedule ==
Legend
	Arizona win
	Arizona loss
*	Non-Conference game

2008 Arizona Wildcats softball game log
Regular season

February
Date	Opponent	Site/stadium	Score	Overall record	Pac-10 record
Feb 16	vs No. 6 Northwestern*	Alberta B. Farrington Softball Stadium • Tempe, AZ (Kajikawa Classic)	L 5–8	0–1	
Feb 16	vs No. 3 Texas A&M*	Alberta B. Farrington Softball Stadium • Tempe, AZ (Kajikawa Classic)	L 2–3	0–2	
Feb 17	vs Nevada*	Alberta B. Farrington Softball Stadium • Tempe, AZ (Kajikawa Classic)	L 0–1	0–3	
Feb 17	vs Southern Utah*	Alberta B. Farrington Softball Stadium • Tempe, AZ (Kajikawa Classic)	W 8–0 ^{(5)}	1–3	
Feb 17	vs Southern Utah*	Alberta B. Farrington Softball Stadium • Tempe, AZ (Kajikawa Classic)	W 11–3 ^{(6)}	2–3	
Feb 22	vs San Diego State*	Big League Dreams Sports Park • Cathedral City, CA (Mary Nutter Collegiate Classic)	L 1–2	2–4	
Feb 22	vs No. 10 Baylor*	Big League Dreams Sports Park • Cathedral City, CA (Mary Nutter Collegiate Classic)	W 12–0 ^{(5)}	3–4	
Feb 23	vs UMass*	Big League Dreams Sports Park • Cathedral City, CA (Mary Nutter Collegiate Classic)	W 4–2 ^{(13)}	4–4	
Feb 23	vs Long Island*	Big League Dreams Sports Park • Cathedral City, CA (Mary Nutter Collegiate Classic)	W 4–0	5–4	
Feb 24	vs No. 6 LSU*	Big League Dreams Sports Park • Cathedral City, CA (Mary Nutter Collegiate Classic)	W 7–4	6–4	
Feb 29	South Florida*	Rita Hillenbrand Memorial Stadium • Tucson, AZ (Hillenbrand Invitational)	W 12–0 ^{(5)}	7–4	
Feb 29	Iowa State*	Rita Hillenbrand Memorial Stadium • Tucson, AZ (Hillenbrand Invitational)	W 7–1	8–4	

March
Date	Opponent	Site/stadium	Score	Overall record	Pac-10 record
Mar 1	UIC*	Rita Hillenbrand Memorial Stadium • Tucson, AZ (Hillenbrand Invitational)	W 18–3 ^{(5)}	9–4	
Mar 1	No. 24 Virginia Tech*	Rita Hillenbrand Memorial Stadium • Tucson, AZ (Hillenbrand Invitational)	W 4–2	10–4	
Mar 2	New Mexico State*	Rita Hillenbrand Memorial Stadium • Tucson, AZ (Hillenbrand Invitational)	W 9–1 ^{(6)}	11–4	
Mar 6	Creighton*	Rita Hillenbrand Memorial Stadium • Tucson, AZ (Wildcat Invitational)	W 6–0	12–4	
Mar 7	La Salle*	Rita Hillenbrand Memorial Stadium • Tucson, AZ (Wildcat Invitational)	W 18–2	13–4	
Mar 7	Creighton*	Rita Hillenbrand Memorial Stadium • Tucson, AZ (Wildcat Invitational)	W 15–1 ^{(5)}	14–4	
Mar 8	La Salle*	Rita Hillenbrand Memorial Stadium • Tucson, AZ (Wildcat Invitational)	W 16–0 ^{(5)}	15–4	
Mar 8	Creighton*	Rita Hillenbrand Memorial Stadium • Tucson, AZ (Wildcat Invitational)	L 1–2	15–5	
Mar 14	New Mexico*	Rita Hillenbrand Memorial Stadium • Tucson, AZ (Wildcat Invitational)	W 8–1	16–5	
Mar 15	New Mexico*	Rita Hillenbrand Memorial Stadium • Tucson, AZ (Wildcat Invitational)	W 8–0 ^{(5)}	17–5	
Mar 18	at UTEP*	Helen of Troy Softball Complex • El Paso, TX	L 6–9	17–6	
Mar 18	at UTEP*	Helen of Troy Softball Complex • El Paso, TX	W 8–2	18–6	
Mar 20	vs No. 14 DePaul*	Anderson Family Field • Fullerton, CA (Judi Garman Classic)	W 11–0	19–6	
Mar 21	vs Florida State*	Anderson Family Field • Fullerton, CA (Judi Garman Classic)	W 13–2 ^{(6)}	20–6	
Mar 21	vs No. 6 Michigan*	Anderson Family Field • Fullerton, CA (Judi Garman Classic)	L 0–2	20–7	
Mar 22	vs No. 16 Louisiana–Lafayette*	Anderson Family Field • Fullerton, CA (Judi Garman Classic)	W 2–0	21–7	
Mar 22	at Cal State Fullerton*	Anderson Family Field • Fullerton, CA (Judi Garman Classic)	L 1–2	21–8	
Mar 26	Marshall*	Rita Hillenbrand Memorial Stadium • Tucson, AZ	W 9–1 ^{(5)}	22–8	
Mar 26	Marshall*	Rita Hillenbrand Memorial Stadium • Tucson, AZ	W 11–5	23–8	
Mar 28	at No. 5 Stanford	Boyd & Jill Smith Family Stadium • Stanford, CA	W 4–1 ^{(8)}	24–8	1–0
Mar 29	at No. 23 California	Levine-Fricke Field • Berkeley, CA	L 1–3	24–9	1–1
Mar 30	at No. 23 California	Levine-Fricke Field • Berkeley, CA	W 5–2	25–9	2–1

April
Date	Opponent	Site/stadium	Score	Overall record	Pac-10 record
Apr 4	at Oregon State	Oregon State Softball Complex • Corvallis, OR	W 6–0	26–9	3–1
Apr 5	at Oregon	Howe Field • Eugene, OR	W 5–1	27–9	4–1
Apr 6	at Oregon	Howe Field • Eugene, OR	L 2–3	27–10	4–2
Apr 9	No. 1 Arizona State	Rita Hillenbrand Memorial Stadium • Tucson, AZ	L 1–8	27–11	4–3
Apr 11	No. 23 Washington	Rita Hillenbrand Memorial Stadium • Tucson, AZ	W 5–4 ^{(8)}	28–11	5–3
Apr 12	No. 4 UCLA	Rita Hillenbrand Memorial Stadium • Tucson, AZ	W 8–0 ^{(6)}	29–11	6–3
Apr 13	No. 4 UCLA	Rita Hillenbrand Memorial Stadium • Tucson, AZ	L 1–2	29–12	6–4
Apr 18	at No. 2 Arizona State	Alberta B. Farrington Softball Stadium • Tempe, AZ	L 0–2	29–13	6–5
Apr 19	at No. 2 Arizona State	Alberta B. Farrington Softball Stadium • Tempe, AZ	L 8–9	29–14	6–6
Apr 25	Oregon	Rita Hillenbrand Memorial Stadium • Tucson, AZ	L 1–2	29–15	6–7
Apr 26	Oregon State	Rita Hillenbrand Memorial Stadium • Tucson, AZ	W 7–6	30–15	7–7
Apr 27	Oregon State	Rita Hillenbrand Memorial Stadium • Tucson, AZ	W 13–1 ^{(5)}	31–15	8–7

May
Date	Opponent	Site/stadium	Score	Overall record	Pac-10 record
May 2	at No. 4 UCLA	Easton Stadium • Los Angeles, CA	L 1–2	31–16	8–8
May 3	at No. 23 Washington	Husky Softball Stadium • Seattle, WA	W 3–0	32–16	9–8
May 4	at No. 23 Washington	Husky Softball Stadium • Seattle, WA	W 3–0	33–16	10–8
May 8	No. 23 California	Rita Hillenbrand Memorial Stadium • Tucson, AZ	W 3–0	34–16	11–8
May 9	No. 8 Stanford	Rita Hillenbrand Memorial Stadium • Tucson, AZ	W 8–0 ^{(6)}	35–16	12–8
May 10	No. 8 Stanford	Rita Hillenbrand Memorial Stadium • Tucson, AZ	W 6–1	36–16	13–8

Postseason

NCAA Hempstead Regional
Date	Opponent	Site/stadium	Score	Overall record	NCAAT record
May 17	Canisius	Hofstra Softball Stadium • Hempstead, NY	W 11–0 ^{(5)}	37–16	1–0
May 17	Hofstra	Hofstra Softball Stadium • Hempstead, NY	W 10–0 ^{(5)}	38–16	2–0
May 18	Hofstra	Hofstra Softball Stadium • Hempstead, NY	W 5–0	39–16	3–0

NCAA Tucson Super Regional
Date	Opponent	Site/stadium	Score	Overall record	NCAAT record
May 23	No. 7 Oklahoma	Rita Hillenbrand Memorial Stadium • Tucson, AZ	W 3–1	40–16	1–0
May 24	No. 7 Oklahoma	Rita Hillenbrand Memorial Stadium • Tucson, AZ	L 0–2	40–17	1–1
May 24	No. 7 Oklahoma	Rita Hillenbrand Memorial Stadium • Tucson, AZ	W 5–2	41–17	2–1

NCAA Women's College World Series
Date	Opponent	Site/stadium	Score	Overall record	WCWS Record
May 29	No. 5 UCLA	ASA Hall of Fame Stadium • Oklahoma City, OK	L 0–1	41–18	0–1
May 31	No. 3 Alabama	ASA Hall of Fame Stadium • Oklahoma City, OK	L 1–5	41–19	0–2
