= 2008 Texas A&M Aggies softball team =

American college softball season

2008 Texas A&M Aggies softball

NCAA College Station Super Regional champion NCAA College Station Regional champion Big 12 Tournament champion Big 12 Conference tournament

Women's College World Series, runner-up
- Conference: Big 12 Conference
- Record: 57–10 (17–1 Big 12)
- Head coach: Jo Evans (12th season)

2008 Big 12 Conference softball standings
| | Conf. | | | | | | Overall |
| Team | W | | L | | T | PCT | W | | L | | T | PCT |
|---|---|---|---|---|---|---|---|---|---|---|---|---|
| No. 2 Texas A&M ‍†‍‍^{y} | 17 | – | 1 | – | 0 | .944 | 57 | – | 10 | – | 0 | .851 |
| No. 10 Oklahoma ‍‍‍^{y} | 16 | – | 2 | – | 0 | .889 | 47 | – | 14 | – | 0 | .770 |
| No. 19 Missouri ‍‍‡‍^{y} | 11 | – | 6 | – | 0 | .647 | 47 | – | 17 | – | 0 | .734 |
| Texas ‍‍‍^{y} | 9 | – | 9 | – | 0 | .500 | 29 | – | 23 | – | 2 | .556 |
| Oklahoma State ‍‍‍ | 9 | – | 9 | – | 0 | .500 | 26 | – | 25 | – | 0 | .510 |
| Texas Tech ‍‍‍ | 8 | – | 10 | – | 0 | .444 | 23 | – | 36 | – | 0 | .390 |
| Kansas ‍‍‍ | 7 | – | 11 | – | 0 | .389 | 37 | – | 19 | – | 0 | .661 |
| Baylor ‍‍‍ | 4 | – | 13 | – | 0 | .235 | 23 | – | 22 | – | 0 | .511 |
| Iowa State ‍‍‍ | 4 | – | 14 | – | 0 | .222 | 29 | – | 29 | – | 0 | .500 |
| Nebraska ‍‍‍ | 4 | – | 14 | – | 0 | .222 | 25 | – | 28 | – | 0 | .472 |
† – Conference champion ‡ – Tournament champion y – Invited to the NCAA tournament Rankings from NFCA

The 2008 Texas A&M Aggies softball team represented Texas A&M University in the 2008 NCAA Division I softball season. The Aggies were coached by Jo Evans, who led her twelfth season. The Aggies finished with a record of 57–10, and won the Big 12 Conference with a 17–1 record.

The Aggies were invited to the 2008 NCAA Division I Softball Tournament, where they swept the NCAA Central Regional and then completed a run to the title game of the Women's College World Series where they fell to champion Arizona State.

== Roster ==
2008 Texas A&M Aggies roster
| Pitchers: - Megan Gibson - Senior; - Rhi Kliesing; - Amanda Scarborough - Senior; Catchers: - Jennifer Corkin; - Erin Glasco | Infielders: - Jamie Hinshaw - Senior; - Holly Ridley - Junior; Outfielders | - Mandy Gegen; - Jamie Lobpries - Senior; - Macie Morrow - Sophomore; - Alex Reynolds - Sophomore; - Bailey Schroeder - Sophomore |

== Schedule ==
Legend
| | Texas A&M win |
| | Texas A&M loss |
| * | Non-Conference game |

2008 Texas A&M Aggies softball game log
Regular season

February
| Date | Opponent | Site/stadium | Score | Overall record | Big 12 record |
|---|---|---|---|---|---|
| Feb 8 | vs New Mexico State* | Big League Dreams Sportspark • Cathedral City, CA (Cathedral City Kickoff) | W 3–2 | 1–0 | |
| Feb 8 | vs Cal Poly* | Big League Dreams Sportspark • Cathedral City, CA (Cathedral City Kickoff) | L 1–5 | 1–1 | |
| Feb 9 | vs Cal State Northridge* | Big League Dreams Sportspark • Cathedral City, CA (Cathedral City Kickoff) | W 3–0 | 2–1 | |
| Feb 9 | vs Oregon State* | Big League Dreams Sportspark • Cathedral City, CA (Cathedral City Kickoff) | W 9–1 | 3–1 | |
| Feb 10 | vs Utah State* | Big League Dreams Sportspark • Cathedral City, CA (Cathedral City Kickoff) | W 9–0 | 4–1 | |
| Feb 13 | Sam Houston State* | Aggie Softball Complex • College Station, TX | W 6–0 | 5–1 | |
| Feb 15 | vs Nevada* | Alberta B. Farrington Softball Stadium • Tempe, AZ (Kajijawa Classic) | W 5–0 | 6–1 | |
| Feb 16 | vs Arizona* | Alberta B. Farrington Softball Stadium • Tempe, AZ (Kajijawa Classic) | W 3–2 | 7–1 | |
| Feb 16 | vs Notre Dame* | Alberta B. Farrington Softball Stadium • Tempe, AZ (Kajijawa Classic) | W 4–1 | 8–1 | |
| Feb 17 | vs Northwestern* | Alberta B. Farrington Softball Stadium • Tempe, AZ (Kajijawa Classic) | L 7–8 | 8–2 | |
| Feb 17 | vs Washington* | Alberta B. Farrington Softball Stadium • Tempe, AZ (Kajijawa Classic) | W 10–4 | 9–2 | |
| Feb 20 | Stephen F. Austin* | Aggie Softball Complex • College Station, TX | W 7–1 | 10–2 | |
| Feb 20 | Stephen F. Austin* | Aggie Softball Complex • College Station, TX | W 3–0 | 11–2 | |
| Feb 22 | Temple* | Aggie Softball Complex • College Station, TX (Texas A&M Invitational) | W 7–0 | 12–2 | |
| Feb 22 | Sam Houston State* | Aggie Softball Complex • College Station, TX (Texas A&M Invitational) | W 2–0 | 13–2 | |
| Feb 23 | North Texas* | Aggie Softball Complex • College Station, TX (Texas A&M Invitational) | W 13–1 | 14–2 | |
| Feb 23 | Temple* | Aggie Softball Complex • College Station, TX (Texas A&M Invitational) | W 6–0 | 15–2 | |
| Feb 24 | North Texas* | Aggie Softball Complex • College Station, TX (Texas A&M Invitational) | W 9–1 | 16–2 | |
| Feb 27 | Houston* | Aggie Softball Complex • College Station, TX | W 2–0 | 17–2 | |
| Feb 27 | Houston* | Aggie Softball Complex • College Station, TX | W 8–7 | 18–2 | |
| Feb 29 | vs DePaul* | South Commons Complex • Columbus, GA (NFCA Leadoff Classic) | W 8–0 | 19–2 | |
| Feb 29 | vs Georgia Tech* | South Commons Complex • Columbus, GA (NFCA Leadoff Classic) | W 2–0 | 20–2 | |

March
| Date | Opponent | Site/stadium | Score | Overall record | |
|---|---|---|---|---|---|
| Mar 1 | vs Florida State* | South Commons Complex • Columbus, GA (NFCA Leadoff Classic) | W 7–0 | 21–2 | |
| Mar 1 | vs UMass* | South Commons Complex • Columbus, GA (NFCA Leadoff Classic) | L 1–4 | 21–3 | |
| Mar 2 | vs NC State* | South Commons Complex • Columbus, GA (NFCA Leadoff Classic) | W 4–0 | 22–3 | |
| Mar 7 | Louisiana–Lafayette* | Aggie Softball Complex • College Station, TX (Aggie Classic) | W 1–0 | 23–3 | |
| Mar 7 | BYU* | Aggie Softball Complex • College Station, TX (Aggie Classic) | W 3–1 | 24–3 | |
| Mar 8 | Illinois* | Aggie Softball Complex • College Station, TX (Aggie Classic) | W 7–3 | 25–3 | |
| Mar 8 | Louisiana–Lafayette* | Aggie Softball Complex • College Station, TX (Aggie Classic) | L 1–2^{8} | 25–4 | |
| Mar 14 | vs Utah* | SDSU Softball Stadium • San Diego, CA (San Diego Classic II) | W 3–1 | 26–4 | |
| Mar 14 | vs San Diego* | SDSU Softball Stadium • San Diego, CA (San Diego Classic II) | W 9–0 | 27–4 | |
| Mar 15 | vs Cal State Fullerton* | SDSU Softball Stadium • San Diego, CA (San Diego Classic II) | W 4–1 | 28–4 | |
| Mar 15 | at San Diego State* | SDSU Softball Stadium • San Diego, CA (San Diego Classic II) | L 0–3 | 28–5 | |
| Mar 16 | vs Long Beach State* | SDSU Softball Stadium • San Diego, CA (San Diego Classic II) | L 1–2 | 28–6 | |
| Mar 19 | Baylor | Aggie Softball Complex • College Station, TX | W 8–0 | 29–6 | 1–0 |
| Mar 21 | at Texas Tech | Rocky Johnson Field • Lubbock, TX | W 7–3^{9} | 30–6 | 2–0 |
| Mar 22 | at Texas Tech | Rocky Johnson Field • Lubbock, TX | W 3–1 | 31–6 | 3–0 |
| Mar 26 | at Baylor | Getterman Stadium • Waco, TX | W 8–0 | 32–6 | 4–0 |
| Mar 29 | Missouri | Aggie Softball Complex • College Station, TX | W 5–1 | 33–6 | 5–0 |
| Mar 30 | Missouri | Aggie Softball Complex • College Station, TX | W 9–4 | 34–6 | 6–0 |

April
| Date | Opponent | Site/stadium | Score | Overall record | |
|---|---|---|---|---|---|
| Apr 5 | at Iowa State | Ames, IA | W 11–1 | 35–6 | 7–0 |
| Apr 5 | at Iowa State | Ames, IA | W 9–1 | 36–6 | 8–0 |
| Apr 9 | at Texas | Red and Charline McCombs Field • Austin, TX | W 3–1 | 37–6 | 9–0 |
| Apr 12 | Oklahoma | Aggie Softball Complex • College Station, TX | W 4–2 | 38–6 | 10–0 |
| Apr 13 | Oklahoma | Aggie Softball Complex • College Station, TX | W 1–0 | 39–6 | 11–0 |
| Apr 16 | at Oklahoma State | Cowgirl Stadium • Stillwater, OK | L 5–6 | 39–7 | 11–1 |
| Apr 16 | at Oklahoma State | Cowgirl Stadium • Stillwater, OK | W 4–3 | 40–7 | 12–1 |
| Apr 19 | Kansas | Aggie Softball Complex • College Station, TX | W 14–0 | 41–7 | 13–1 |
| Apr 20 | Kansas | Aggie Softball Complex • College Station, TX | W 8–0 | 42–7 | 14–1 |
| Apr 23 | Texas State* | Aggie Softball Complex • College Station, TX | W 11–0 | 43–7 | |
| Apr 26 | at Nebraska | Bowlin Stadium • Lincoln, NE | W 6–0 | 44–7 | 15–1 |
| Apr 27 | at Nebraska | Bowlin Stadium • Lincoln, NE | W 6–3 | 45–7 | 16–1 |
| Apr 30 | Texas | Aggie Softball Complex • College Station, TX | W 2–1 | 46–7 | 17–1 |

Postseason

Big 12 Tournament
| Date | Opponent | Site/stadium | Seed | Score | Overall record | Big12T record |
|---|---|---|---|---|---|---|
| May 10 | (9) Iowa State | (1) | ASA Hall of Fame Stadium • Oklahoma City, OK | W 1–0 | 47–7 | 1–0 |
| May 10 | (4) Texas | (1) | ASA Hall of Fame Stadium • Oklahoma City, OK | W 3–1 | 48–7 | 2–0 |
| May 11 | (10) Nebraska | (1) | ASA Hall of Fame Stadium • Oklahoma City, OK | W 5–0 | 49–7 | 3–0 |

NCAA College Station Regional
| Date | Opponent | Site/stadium | Score | Overall record | Reg record |
|---|---|---|---|---|---|
| May 16 | Stephen F. Austin | Aggie Softball Complex • College Station, TX | W 2–0 | 50–7 | 1–0 |
| May 17 | Louisiana Tech | Aggie Softball Complex • College Station, TX | W 4–0 | 51–7 | 2–0 |
| May 18 | Louisiana Tech | Aggie Softball Complex • College Station, TX | W 6–0 | 52–7 | 3–0 |

NCAA College Station Super Regional
| Date | Opponent | Seed | Site/stadium | Score | Overall record | SR record |
|---|---|---|---|---|---|---|
| May 24 | (12) Stanford | (5) | Aggie Softball Complex • College Station, TX | W 6–1 | 53–7 | 1–0 |
| May 25 | (12) Stanford | (5) | Aggie Softball Complex • College Station, TX | W 9–4 | 54–7 | 2–0 |

NCAA Women's College World Series
| Date | Opponent | Seed | Site/stadium | Score | Overall record | WCWS Record |
|---|---|---|---|---|---|---|
| May 29 | Virginia Tech | (5) | ASA Hall of Fame Stadium • Oklahoma City, OK | W 1–0 | 55–7 | 1–0 |
| May 30 | Louisiana–Lafayette | (5) | ASA Hall of Fame Stadium • Oklahoma City, OK | W 2–1 | 56–7 | 2–0 |
| June 1 | (1) Florida | (5) | ASA Hall of Fame Stadium • Oklahoma City, OK | L 1–6 | 56–8 | 2–1 |
| June 1 | (1) Florida | (5) | ASA Hall of Fame Stadium • Oklahoma City, OK | W 1–0^{9} | 57–8 | 3–1 |
| June 2 | (6) Arizona State | (5) | ASA Hall of Fame Stadium • Oklahoma City, OK | L 0–3 | 57–9 | 3–2 |
| June 3 | (6) Arizona State | (5) | ASA Hall of Fame Stadium • Oklahoma City, OK | L 0–11 | 57–10 | 3–3 |
