= 2008 Louisiana–Lafayette Ragin' Cajuns softball team =

American college softball season

2008 Louisiana–Lafayette Ragin' Cajuns softball

Women's College World Series appearance Houston Super Regionals champions Baton Rouge Regionals champions

Sun Belt Conference tournament champions Sun Belt Conference regular-season champions
- Conference: Sun Belt Conference

Ranking
- Coaches: No. 6
- Record: 52–15 (19–3 SBC)
- Head coach: Michael Lotief (8th season) (9th season); Stefni Lotief
- Home stadium: Alfred and Helen Lamson Park

2008 Sun Belt Conference softball standings
	Conf.				Overall
Team	W		L	PCT	W		L	PCT
No. 6 Louisiana–Lafayette ‍†‍‡‍^{y}	19	–	3	.864	52	–	15	.776
Florida Atlantic ‍‍‍	17	–	7	.708	35	–	26	.574
Troy ‍‍‍	14	–	9	.609	33	–	23	.589
FIU ‍‍‍	12	–	11	.522	29	–	34	.460
Middle Tennessee ‍‍‍	11	–	12	.478	22	–	31	.415
North Texas ‍‍‍	9	–	15	.375	27	–	33	.450
Louisiana–Monroe ‍‍‍	9	–	15	.375	22	–	37	.373
Western Kentucky ‍‍‍	8	–	15	.348	28	–	30	.483
South Alabama ‍‍‍	6	–	18	.250	22	–	31	.415
† – Conference champion ‡ – Tournament champion y – Invited to the NCAA tournament As of June 2008; Rankings from

The 2008 Louisiana–Lafayette Ragin' Cajuns softball team represented the University of Louisiana at Lafayette in the 2008 NCAA Division I softball season. The Ragin' Cajuns played their home games at Lamson Park and were led by eighth and ninth year husband and wife head coaching duo Michael and Stefni Lotief, respectively.

== Roster ==
2008 Louisiana–Lafayette Ragin' Cajuns roster
Pitchers: 00 Ashley Brignac – Redshirt Freshman; 5 Shari Sigur – Sophomore; 10 Brittany Cuevas – Sophomore; 18 Amanda Hill – Sophomore; 21 Donna Bourgeois – Redshirt Freshman; Utility Players: 8 Monique Prejean – Redshirt Freshman; 12 Christi Orgeron – Redshirt Freshman; Catchers: 6 Lana Bowers – Sophomore; 15 Adele Files – Sophomore	Infielders: 3 Brooke Brodhead – Senior; 4 Kelly Cormier – Redshirt Freshman; 7 Vanessa Soto – Senior; 16 Melissa Verde – Sophomore; 19 Courtney Trahan – Sophomore; 22 Laura Anne Hagle – Redshirt Freshman; 24 Codi Runyan – Senior; 25 Gabriele Bridges – Redshirt Freshman; 27 Jessica Dupont – Redshirt Freshman; 31 Paige Cormier – Redshirt Freshman; Outfielders: 9 Karli Hubbard – Junior; 14 Vallie Gaspard – Sophomore; 17 Meagan Godwin – Sophomore; 20 Katie Smith – Redshirt Freshman; 23 Holly Tankersley – Senior; 30 Katey Stanford – Redshirt Freshman

=== Coaching staff ===
2008 Louisiana–Lafayette Ragin' Cajuns coaching staff
- Michael Lotief – Co-Head Coach – 8th year
- Stefni Lotief – Co-Head Coach – 9th year

== Schedule and results ==
Legend
	Louisiana–Lafayette win
	Louisiana–Lafayette loss
	Postponement
**Bold**	Louisiana–Lafayette team member

2008 Louisiana–Lafayette Ragin' Cajuns Softball Game Log
Regular season (42–12)

February (9–1)
Date	Opponent	Ranking	Site/stadium	Score	TV	Overall record	SBC record
Louisiana Tech Tournament
Feb. 9	vs. Louisiana–Monroe		Lady Techsters Softball Complex • Ruston, LA	**W** 6–0		1–0	
Feb. 9	at Louisiana Tech		Lady Techsters Softball Complex • Ruston, LA	**W** 13–0		2–0	
Feb. 10	at Louisiana Tech		Lady Techsters Softball Complex • Ruston, LA	**W** 8–3		3–0	
Feb. 20	at McNeese State		Cowgirl Diamond • Lake Charles, LA	**W** 12–0		4–0	
Louisiana Classics
Feb. 22	vs. Mississippi Valley State		Alfred and Helen Lamson Park • Lafayette, LA	**W** 15–0		5–0	
Feb. 23	vs. Southern Miss		Alfred and Helen Lamson Park • Lafayette, LA	**W** 4–1		6–0	
Feb. 24	vs. Mississippi Valley State		Alfred and Helen Lamson Park • Lafayette, LA	**W** 9–0		7–0	
Feb. 24	vs. Southern Miss		Alfred and Helen Lamson Park • Lafayette, LA	**W** 3–2		8–0	
NFCA Leadoff Classic
Feb. 29	vs. North Carolina		South Commons Sports Complex • Columbus, GA	**W** 7–1		9–0	
Feb. 29	vs. Nebraska		South Commons Sports Complex • Columbus, GA	**L** 1–3		9–1	

March (10–6)
Dat	Opponent	Ranking	Site/stadium	Score	TV	Overall record	SBC record
NFCA Leadoff Classic
Mar. 1	vs. Tennessee Tech		South Commons Softball Complex • Columbus, GA	**W** 8–0		10–1	
Mar. 1	vs. Iowa		South Commons Softball Complex • Columbus, GA	**L** 1–3		10–2	
Mar. 2	vs. Michigan		South Commons Softball Complex • Columbus, GA	**L** 0–9		10–3	
Mar. 4	Nicholls State		Alfred and Helen Lamson Park • Lafayette, LA	**W** 11–3		11–3	
Mar. 4	Nicholls		Alfred and Helen Lamson Park • Lafayette, LA	**W** 12–0		12–3	
Aggie Classic
Mar. 7	at Texas A&M		Aggie Softball Complex • College Station, TX	**L** 0–1		12–4	
Mar. 8	vs. BYU		Aggie Softball Complex • College Station, TX	**W** 7–4		13–4	
Mar. 8	at Texas A&M		Aggie Softball Complex • College Station, TX	**W** 2–1		14–4	
Mar. 9	vs. Illinois		Aggie Softball Complex • College Station, TX	**W** 4–1		15–4	
Mar. 9	vs. Illinois		Aggie Softball Complex • College Station, TX	**L** 1–2		15–5	
Mar. 11	IUPUI		Alfred and Helen Lamson Park • Lafayette, LA	**W** 12–0		16–5	
Mar. 11	IUPUI		Alfred and Helen Lamson Park • Lafayette, LA	**W** 14–0		17–5	
Mar. 15	at Middle Tennessee		Blue Raider Softball Park • Murfreesboro, TN	Game cancelled			
Mar. 16	at Middle Tennessee		Blue Raiders Softball Park • Murfreesboro, TN	**W** 8–1		18–5	1–0
Mar. 16	at Middle Tennessee		Blue Raider Softball Park • Murfreesboro, TN	**W** 12–1		19–5	2–0
Judi Garman Classic
Mar. 21	vs. Arizona State		Anderson Family Field • Fullerton, CA	**L** 1–3		19–6	
Mar. 21	vs. UNLV		Anderson Family Field • Fullerton, CA	**W** 10–0		20–6	
Mar. 22	vs. Arizona		Anderson Family Field • Fullerton, CA	**L** 0–2		20–7	
Mar. 22	vs. Michigan		Anderson Family Field • Fullerton, CA	**L** 2–7		20–8	
Mar. 25	at Western Kentucky		WKU Softball Complex • Bowling Green, KY	**L** 2–5		20–9	2–1
Mar. 25	at Western Kentucky		WKU Softball Complex • Bowling Green, KY	**W** 11–4		21–9	3–1
Mar. 26	at Western Kentucky		WKU Softball Complex • Bowling Green, KY	**L** 2–3		21–10	3–2

April (19–1)
Date	Opponent	Ranking	Site/stadium	Score	TV	Overall record	SBC record
Apr. 1	vs. Grambling State		Alfred and Helen Lamson Park • Lafayette, LA	**W** 8–0		22–10	
Apr. 1	vs. Grambling State		Alfred and Helen Lamson Park • Lafayette, LA	**W** 6–0		23–10	
Apr. 5	at FIU		FIU Softball Stadium • Miami, FL	**W** 7–6		24–10	4-2
Apr. 5	at FIU		FIU Softball Stadium • Miami, FL	**W** 9–8		25–10	5-2
Apr. 6	at FIU		FIU Softball Stadium • Miami, FL	**W** 7–4		26–10	6-2
Apr. 9	vs. McNeese State		Alfred and Helen Lamson Park • Lafayette, LA	**W** 7–0		27–10	
Apr. 12	vs. South Alabama		Alfred and Helen Lamson Park • Lafayette, LA	**W** 10–2		28–10	7-2
Apr. 12	vs. South Alabama		Alfred and Helen Lamson Park • Lafayette, LA	**W** 7–1		29–10	8-2
Apr. 13	vs. South Alabama		Alfred and Helen Lamson Park • Lafayette, LA	**W** 8–0		30–10	9-2
Apr. 16	vs. Florida Atlantic		Alfred and Helen Lamson Park • Lafayette, LA	**W** 5–1		31–10	10-2
Apr. 16	vs. Florida Atlantic		Alfred and Helen Lamson Park • Lafayette, LA	**W** 4–0		32–10	11-2
Apr. 17	vs. Florida Atlantic		Alfred and Helen Lamson Park • Lafayette, LA	**W** 4–0		33–10	12-2
Apr. 23	vs. North Texas		Alfred and Helen Lamson Park • Lafayette, LA	**W** 8–0		34–10	13-2
Apr. 23	vs. North Texas		Alfred and Helen Lamson Park • Lafayette, LA	**W** 8–0		35–10	14-2
Apr. 24	vs. North Texas		Alfred and Helen Lamson Park • Lafayette, LA	**W** 3–2		36–10	15-2
Apr. 26	at Troy		Troy Softball Complex • Troy, AL	**W** 4–2		37–10	16-2
Apr. 26	at Troy		Troy Softball Complex • Troy, AL	**W** 4–0		38–10	17-2
Apr. 27	at Troy		Troy Softball Complex • Troy, AL	Game cancelled			
Apr. 30	at Houston		Cougar Softball Field • Houston, TX	**L** 0–2		38–11	
Apr. 30	at Houston		Cougar Softball Field • Houston, TX	**W** 4–0		39–11	

May (2–1)
Date	Opponent	Ranking	Site/stadium	Score	TV	Overall record	SBC record
May 3	vs. Louisiana–Monroe		Alfred and Helen Lamson Park • Lafayette, LA	**L** 0–1		39–12	17-3
May 3	vs. Louisiana–Monroe		Alfred and Helen Lamson Park • Lafayette, LA	**W** 9–1		40–12	18-3
May 4	vs. Louisiana–Monroe		Alfred and Helen Lamson Park • Lafayette, LA	**W** 10–0		42–12	19-3

Post-Season (10–3)

SBC tournament (4–0)
Date	Opponent	Ranking	Site/stadium	Score	TV	Overall record	SBC record
May 7	vs. Western Kentucky		Troy Softball Complex • Troy, AL	**W** 8–0		43–12	
May 8	vs. FIU		Troy Softball Complex • Troy, AL	**W** 8–2		44–12	
May 9	vs. Western Kentucky		Troy Softball Complex • Troy, AL	**W** 3–1		45–12	
May 10	vs. Louisiana–Monroe		Troy Softball Complex • Troy, AL	**W** 13–0		46–12	

NCAA Division I Softball Championship (6–3)
Date	Opponent	Ranking	Site/stadium	Score	TV	Overall record	SBC record
Baton Rouge Regional
May 16	vs. East Carolina		Tiger Park • Baton Rouge, LA	**W** 2–1		47–12	
May 17	vs. LSU		Tiger Park • Baton Rouge, LA	**W** 9–4		48–12	
May 17	vs. LSU		Tiger Park • Baton Rouge, LA	**W** 6–3		49–12	
Houston Super Regional
May 23	at Houston		Cougar Softball Field • Houston, TX	**W** 6–4		50–12	
May 24	at Houston		Cougar Softball Field • Houston, TX	**L** 3–6		50–13	
May 24	at Houston		Cougar Softball Field • Houston, TX	**W** 4–0		51–13	
Women's College World Series
May 29	vs. Florida		ASA Hall of Fame Stadium • Oklahoma City, OK	**W** 3–2		52–13	
May 30	vs. Texas A&M		ASA Hall of Fame Stadium • Oklahoma City, OK	**L** 1–2		52–14	
May 31	vs. Alabama		ASA Hall of Fame Stadium • Oklahoma City, OK	**L** 1–3		52–15	

Schedule source:

== Baton Rouge Regional ==
Baton Rouge Regional Teams
(1) LSU Lady Tigers	(2) Louisiana–Lafayette Ragin' Cajuns	(3) East Carolina Pirates	(4) Mississippi Valley State Devilettes

First Round
9	LSU	8
Mississippi Valley St.	0
East Carolina	1
Louisiana–Lafayette	2
Lower round 1
Mississippi Valley St.	2
East Carolina	4

Semi-Finals
9	LSU	4
Louisiana–Lafayette	9
Lower final
East Carolina	1
9	LSU	9

Finals
Louisiana–Lafayette	6	–
9	LSU	3	–

== Houston Super Regional ==
Houston Super Regional Teams
(1) Houston Cougars	(2) Louisiana–Lafayette Ragin' Cajuns

Game 1
Rank	Team	Score
	Louisiana–Lafayette	6
8	Houston	4

Game 2
Rank	Team	Score
	Louisiana–Lafayette	3
8	Houston	6

Game 3
Rank	Team	Score
	Louisiana–Lafayette	4
8	Houston	0

== Women's College World Series ==
WCWS Teams
(1) Florida Gators	(2) UCLA Bruins	(3) Alabama Crimson Tide	(5) Texas A&M Aggies	(6) Arizona State Sun Devils	(7) Arizona Wildcats	Louisiana–Lafayette Ragin' Cajuns	Virginia Tech Hokies

First round
1	Florida	2
Louisiana–Lafayette	3
5	Texas A&M	1
Virginia Tech	0
1	Florida	2
Virginia Tech	0
3	Alabama	1
6	Arizona State	3
2	UCLA	1
7	Arizona	0
3	Alabama	5
7	Arizona	1

Second round
Louisiana–Lafayette	1
5	Texas A&M	2
1	Florida	2
2	UCLA	0
6	Arizona State	4
2	UCLA	0
3	Alabama	3
Louisiana–Lafayette	1

Semifinals
5	Texas A&M	1	1
1	Florida	6	0
6	Arizona State	3	—
3	Alabama	1	—

Finals
5	Texas A&M	0	0	—
6	Arizona State	3	11	—
