= 2008 UCLA Bruins softball team =

American college softball season

2008 UCLA Bruins softball

NCAA Los Angeles Super Regional champion NCAA Los Angeles Regional champion

Women's College World Series, 2–2
- Conference: Pacific-10 Conference
- Record: 51–9 (17–4 Pac-10)
- Head coach: Kelly Inouye-Perez (2nd season)
- Home stadium: Easton Stadium

2008 Pacific-10 Conference softball standings
	Conf.						Overall
Team	W		L		T	PCT	W		L		T	PCT
Arizona State ‍†‍‍^{y}	18	–	3	–	0	.857	66	–	5	–	0	.930
UCLA ‍‍‍^{y}	17	–	4	–	0	.810	51	–	9	–	0	.850
Arizona ‍‍‍^{y}	13	–	8	–	0	.619	41	–	19	–	0	.683
Stanford ‍‍‍^{y}	11	–	10	–	0	.524	49	–	15	–	0	.766
California ‍‍‍^{y}	7	–	14	–	0	.333	43	–	27	–	0	.614
Washington ‍‍‍^{y}	7	–	14	–	0	.333	30	–	25	–	1	.545
Oregon State ‍‍‍	6	–	15	–	0	.286	28	–	31	–	0	.475
Oregon ‍‍‍^{y}	5	–	16	–	0	.238	35	–	29	–	0	.547
† – Conference champion y – Invited to the NCAA tournament As of July 30, 2008; Rankings from Coaches' Poll

The 2008 UCLA Bruins softball team represented the University of California, Los Angeles in the 2008 NCAA Division I softball season. The Bruins were coached by Kelly Inouye-Perez, in her second season as head coach. The Bruins played their home games at Easton Stadium and finished with a record of 51–9. They competed in the Pacific-10 Conference, where they finished second with a 17–4 record.

The Bruins were invited to the 2008 NCAA Division I softball tournament, where they won the Los Angeles Regional and Super Regional to advance to the Women's College World Series. They finished tied for fifth place with a win against Arizona and losses to eventual champion Arizona State and Florida.

== Personnel ==
=== Roster ===
2008 UCLA Bruins roster
Pitchers: 4 - Anjelica Selden - Senior; 5 - Donna Kerr - Freshman; 20 - Whitney Baker - Sophomore; 31 - Megan Langenfeld - Sophomore; Catchers: 9 - Kaila Shull - Sophomore; 27 - Jennifer Schroeder - Junior	Infielders: 14 - Julie Burney - Sophomore; 18 - Monica Harrison - Freshman; 21 - Grace Murray - Freshman; 47 - Amanda Kamekona - Junior; Outfielders: 13 - Krista Colburn - Senior; 23 - Amy Crawford - Freshman; 29 - Katie Schroeder - Freshman	Utility: 3 - GiOnna DiSalvatore - Freshman; 7 - Samantha Camuso - Freshman; 10 - Lauren Mirabal - Freshman; 11 - Ashley Herrera - Senior; 44 - Danielle Peterson - Senior

=== Coaches ===
2008 UCLA Bruins softball coaching staff
- Kelly Inouye-Perez - Head coach - 2nd season
- Lisa Fernandez - Assistant Coach - 10th season
- Gina Vecchione - Assistant Coach - 9th season
- Natasha Watley - Assistant Coach - 3rd season

== Schedule ==
Legend
	UCLA win
	UCLA loss
*	Non-Conference game

2008 UCLA Bruins softball game log
Regular season

February
Date	Opponent	Rank	Site/stadium	Score	Overall record	Pac-10 record
Feb 8	Nevada*	No. 14	Easton Stadium • Los Angeles, CA (Stacy Winsberg Memorial Tournament)	W 10–1 ^{(5)}	1–0	
Feb 8	No. 5 Oklahoma*	No. 14	Easton Stadium • Los Angeles, CA (Stacy Winsberg Memorial Tournament)	W 6–1	2–0	
Feb 9	Santa Clara*	No. 14	Easton Stadium • Los Angeles, CA (Stacy Winsberg Memorial Tournament)	W 27–1 ^{(5)}	3–0	
Feb 9	UC Santa Barbara*	No. 14	Easton Stadium • Los Angeles, CA (Stacy Winsberg Memorial Tournament)	W 7–5 ^{(8)}	4–0	
Feb 10	No. 5 Oklahoma*	No. 14	Easton Stadium • Los Angeles, CA (Stacy Winsberg Memorial Tournament)	L 0–7	4–1	
Feb 15	vs Missouri*	No. 10	Eller Media Stadium • Paradise, NV (Louisville Slugger Classic)	W 4–0	5–1	
Feb 15	vs South Carolina*	No. 10	Eller Media Stadium • Paradise, NV (Louisville Slugger Classic)	W 6–2	6–1	
Feb 16	vs Illinois*	No. 10	Eller Media Stadium • Paradise, NV (Louisville Slugger Classic)	L 2–6	6–2	
Feb 16	vs Portland State*	No. 10	Eller Media Stadium • Paradise, NV (Louisville Slugger Classic)	W 7–4	7–2	
Feb 17	vs Wisconsin*	No. 10	Stephanie Craig Park • Henderson, NV (Louisville Slugger Classic)	W 4–1	8–2	
Feb 22	vs UMass*	No. 11	Big League Dreams Sports Park • Cathedral City, CA (Palm Springs Classic)	W 4–2	9–2	
Feb 22	vs No. 19 Georgia*	No. 11	Big League Dreams Sports Park • Cathedral City, CA (Palm Springs Classic)	W 5–2	10–2	
Feb 23	vs No. 10 Baylor*	No. 11	Big League Dreams Sports Park • Cathedral City, CA (Palm Springs Classic)	W 6–1	11–2	
Feb 23	vs No. 14 Hawaii*	No. 11	Big League Dreams Sports Park • Cathedral City, CA (Palm Springs Classic)	W 3–0	12–2	
Feb 24	vs No. 2 Northwestern*	No. 11	Big League Dreams Sports Park • Cathedral City, CA (Palm Springs Classic)	W 6–2	13–2	
Feb 27	Cal State Bakersfield*	No. 7	Easton Stadium • Los Angeles, CA	W 3–0	14–2	
Feb 29	vs James Madison*	No. 7	USD Softball Complex • San Diego, CA (San Diego Classic)	W 8–0 ^{(5)}	15–2	
Feb 29	at San Diego*	No. 7	USD Softball Complex • San Diego, CA (San Diego Classic)	W 10–0 ^{(6)}	16–2	

March
Date	Opponent	Rank	Site/stadium	Score	Overall record	Pac-10 record
Mar 1	vs Eastern Michigan*	No. 7	SDSU Softball Stadium • San Diego, CA (San Diego Classic)	W 8–0 ^{(6)}	17–2	
Mar 1	vs No. 21 San Diego State*	No. 7	SDSU Softball Stadium • San Diego, CA (San Diego Classic)	W 2–1 ^{(9)}	18–2	
Mar 2	vs Saint Peter's*	No. 7	USD Softball Complex • San Diego, CA (San Diego Classic)	W 10–0 ^{(5)}	19–2	
Mar 5	UNLV*	No. 6	Easton Stadium • Los Angeles, CA	W 1–0	20–2	
Mar 7	vs No. 24 Virginia Tech*	No. 6	Mayfair Park Lakewood • Lakewood, CA (Long Beach State Invitational)	W 1–0	21–2	
Mar 7	vs Notre Dame*	No. 6	Mayfair Park Lakewood • Lakewood, CA (Long Beach State Invitational)	W 3–2	22–2	
Mar 8	vs Rutgers*	No. 6	Mayfair Park Lakewood • Lakewood, CA (Long Beach State Invitational)	W 9–0	23–2	
Mar 8	vs No. 8 Northwestern*	No. 6	Mayfair Park Lakewood • Lakewood, CA (Long Beach State Invitational)	W 2–0	24–2	
Mar 9	at Long Beach State*	No. 6	Mayfair Park Lakewood • Lakewood, CA (Long Beach State Invitational)	W 1–0 ^{(8)}	25–2	
Mar 12	Cal State Fullerton*	No. 3	Easton Stadium • Los Angeles, CA	L 0–1 ^{(8)}	25–3	
Mar 13	Cal State Northridge*	No. 3	Easton Stadium • Los Angeles, CA	W 7–0	26–3	
Mar 25	at UC Santa Barbara*	No. 4	Campus Diamond • Santa Barbara, CA	W 7–2	27–3	
Mar 25	at UC Santa Barbara*	No. 4	Campus Diamond • Santa Barbara, CA	W 8–1	28–3	
Mar 28	Oregon State	No. 4	Easton Stadium • Los Angeles, CA	W 3–0	29–3	1–0
Mar 29	Oregon	No. 4	Easton Stadium • Los Angeles, CA	W 2–0	30–3	2–0
Mar 30	Oregon	No. 4	Easton Stadium • Los Angeles, CA	W 12–0 ^{(5)}	31–3	3–0

April
Date	Opponent	Rank	Site/stadium	Score	Overall record	Pac-10 record
Apr 2	No. 25 Washington	No. 4	Easton Stadium • Los Angeles, CA	W 7–6 ^{(8)}	32–3	4–0
Apr 4	No. 7 Stanford	No. 4	Easton Stadium • Los Angeles, CA	W 3–1	33–3	5–0
Apr 5	No. 23 California	No. 4	Easton Stadium • Los Angeles, CA	W 2–1	34–3	6–0
Apr 6	No. 23 California	No. 4	Easton Stadium • Los Angeles, CA	W 5–0	35–3	7–0
Apr 11	at No. 1 Arizona State	No. 4	Alberta B. Farrington Softball Stadium • Tempe, AZ	L 0–3	35–4	7–1
Apr 12	at No. 9 Arizona	No. 4	Rita Hillenbrand Memorial Stadium • Tucson, AZ	L 0–8 ^{(6)}	35–5	7–2
Apr 13	at No. 9 Arizona	No. 4	Rita Hillenbrand Memorial Stadium • Tucson, AZ	W 2–1	36–5	8–2
Apr 18	at No. 22 Washington	No. 5	Husky Softball Stadium • Seattle, WA	W 2–1	37–5	9–2
Apr 19	at No. 22 Washington	No. 5	Husky Softball Stadium • Seattle, WA	W 4–0	38–5	10–2
Apr 25	at No. 21 California	No. 4	Levine-Fricke Field • Berkeley, CA	W 7–2	39–5	11–2
Apr 26	at No. 7 Stanford	No. 4	Boyd & Jill Smith Family Stadium • Stanford, CA	W 1–0	40–5	12–2
Apr 27	at No. 7 Stanford	No. 4	Boyd & Jill Smith Family Stadium • Stanford, CA	W 4–1	41–5	13–2

May
Date	Opponent	Rank	Site/stadium	Score	Overall record	Pac-10 record
May 2	No. 12 Arizona	No. 4	Easton Stadium • Los Angeles, CA	W 2–1	42–5	14–2
May 3	No. 2 Arizona State	No. 4	Easton Stadium • Los Angeles, CA	W 5–0	43–5	15–2
May 4	No. 2 Arizona State	No. 4	Easton Stadium • Los Angeles, CA	L 2–5	43–6	15–3
May 8	at Oregon	No. 4	Jane Sanders Stadium • Eugene, OR	W 3–1	44–6	16–3
May 9	at Oregon State	No. 4	Oregon State Softball Complex • Corvallis, OR	L 3–5	44–7	16–4
May 10	at Oregon State	No. 4	Oregon State Softball Complex • Corvallis, OR	W 5–1	45–7	17–4

Postseason

NCAA Los Angeles Regional
Date	Opponent	Rank	Site/stadium	Score	Overall record	NCAAT record
May 16	Cal State Fullerton	No. 5	Easton Stadium • Los Angeles, CA	W 8–3	46–7	1–0
May 17	No. 20 Nevada	No. 5	Easton Stadium • Los Angeles, CA	W 6–4 ^{(9)}	47–7	2–0
May 18	No. 20 Nevada	No. 5	Easton Stadium • Los Angeles, CA	W 4–3	48–7	3–0

NCAA Los Angeles Super Regional
Date	Opponent	Rank (Seed)	Site/stadium	Score	Overall record	NCAAT record
May 24	No. 23 (15) Georgia	No. 5 (2)	Easton Stadium • Los Angeles, CA	W 6–1	49–7	1–0
May 25	No. 23 (15) Georgia	No. 5 (2)	Easton Stadium • Los Angeles, CA	W 6–0	50–7	2–0

NCAA Women's College World Series
Date	Opponent	Rank (Seed)	Site/stadium	Score	Overall record	WCWS Record
May 29	No. 9 (7) Arizona	No. 5 (2)	ASA Hall of Fame Stadium • Oklahoma City, OK	W 1–0	51–7	1–0
May 30	No. 2 (6) Arizona State	No. 5 (2)	ASA Hall of Fame Stadium • Oklahoma City, OK	L 0–4	51–8	1–1
May 31	No. 1 (1) Florida	No. 5 (2)	ASA Hall of Fame Stadium • Oklahoma City, OK	L 0–2	51–9	1–2
