= 2008 Arizona State Sun Devils softball team =

American college softball season

2008 Arizona State Sun Devils softball

National Champion NCAA Tempe Super Regional champion NCAA Tempe Regional champion Pacific-10 champion
- Conference: Pacific-10 Conference
- Record: 66–5 (18–3 Pac-10)
- Head coach: Clint Myers (3rd season)
- Home stadium: Alberta B. Farrington Softball Stadium

2008 Pacific-10 Conference softball standings
	Conf.						Overall
Team	W		L		T	PCT	W		L		T	PCT
Arizona State ‍†‍‍^{y}	18	–	3	–	0	.857	66	–	5	–	0	.930
UCLA ‍‍‍^{y}	17	–	4	–	0	.810	51	–	9	–	0	.850
Arizona ‍‍‍^{y}	13	–	8	–	0	.619	41	–	19	–	0	.683
Stanford ‍‍‍^{y}	11	–	10	–	0	.524	49	–	15	–	0	.766
California ‍‍‍^{y}	7	–	14	–	0	.333	43	–	27	–	0	.614
Washington ‍‍‍^{y}	7	–	14	–	0	.333	30	–	25	–	1	.545
Oregon State ‍‍‍	6	–	15	–	0	.286	28	–	31	–	0	.475
Oregon ‍‍‍^{y}	5	–	16	–	0	.238	35	–	29	–	0	.547
† – Conference champion y – Invited to the NCAA tournament As of July 30, 2008; Rankings from Coaches' Poll

The 2008 Arizona State Sun Devils softball team represented Arizona State University in the 2008 NCAA Division I softball season. The Sun Devils were coached by Clint Myers, who led his third season. The Sun Devils finished with a record of 66–5. They played their home games at Alberta B. Farrington Softball Stadium and competed in the Pacific-10 Conference, where they finished first with a 18–3 record.

The Sun Devils were invited to the 2008 NCAA Division I softball tournament, where they swept the Regional and Super Regional and then completed a run through the Women's College World Series to claim their first NCAA Women's College World Series Championship.

== Roster ==
2008 Arizona State Sun Devils roster
Pitchers: 4 – Megan Elliott – sophomore; 7 - Katie Burkhart – senior; 23 – Amanda Nesbitt – junior; Catchers: 6 – Renne Welty – junior; 9 – Sarah Rice – freshman; 20 – Brittany Matta – sophomore; 33 – Kristin Miller – senior	Infielders: 5 – Rhiannon Baca – senior; 11 - Krista Donnenwirth – freshman; 22 - Mindy Cowles - senior; 15 – Katie Crabb – sophomore; 18 – Michelle Nulliner – freshman; 25 – Brooke Neuman – junior; 36 – Mandy Urfer – freshman	Outfielders: 2 – Caylyn Carlson – sophomore; 8 – Lesley Rogers – freshman; 12 – Jessica Mapes – junior; 14 – Clarissa Andorfer-Lopez – sophomore; 16 - Kaitlin Cochran – junior; 21 – Jackie Vasquez – senior; 77 – Dani Rae Lougheed – freshman; 99 – Ashley Muenz – sophomore

Designated Hitters

- 22 – Ronni Stirling – freshman
- 3 – Jacqueline Bordonaro – freshman
- 1 – Jessica Giles– junior

|}

== Schedule ==
Legend
	Arizona State win
	Arizona State loss
	Tie
*	Non-Conference game

2008 Arizona State Sun Devils softball game log
Regular season

February
Date	Opponent	Site/stadium	Score	Overall record	Pac-10 record
Feb 9	vs Loyola*	Eller Media Stadium • Paradise, NV	W 8–0^{5}	1–0	
Feb 9	vs Texas Tech*	Eller Media Stadium • Paradise, NV	W 2–0	2–0	
Feb 10	vs Loyola*	Eller Media Stadium • Paradise, NV	W 8–6	3–0	
Feb 10	at UNLV*	Eller Media Stadium • Paradise, NV	L 1–2	3–1	
Feb 14	Western Kentucky*	Alberta B. Farrington Softball Stadium • Tempe, AZ	W 11–3^{6}	4–1	
Feb 15	Western Michigan*	Alberta B. Farrington Softball Stadium • Tempe, AZ	W 6–0	5–1	
Feb 16	Virginia*	Alberta B. Farrington Softball Stadium • Tempe, AZ	W 14–4^{5}	6–1	
Feb 16	Memphis*	Alberta B. Farrington Softball Stadium • Tempe, AZ	W 12–1^{5}	7–1	
Feb 16	Nebraska*	Alberta B. Farrington Softball Stadium • Tempe, AZ	W 9–0^{5}	8–1	
Feb 17	UMKC*	Alberta B. Farrington Softball Stadium • Tempe, AZ	W 15–2^{5}	9–1	
Feb 17	Texas State*	Alberta B. Farrington Softball Stadium • Tempe, AZ	W 4–0	10–1	
Feb 18	Southern Utah*	Alberta B. Farrington Softball Stadium • Tempe, AZ	W 9–3	11–1	
Feb 22	Buffalo*	Alberta B. Farrington Softball Stadium • Tempe, AZ	W 12–3^{5}	12–1	
Feb 22	Illinois State*	Alberta B. Farrington Softball Stadium • Tempe, AZ	W 8–0^{5}	13–1	
Feb 23	Iowa*	Alberta B. Farrington Softball Stadium • Tempe, AZ	W 1–0	14–1	
Feb 23	Radford*	Alberta B. Farrington Softball Stadium • Tempe, AZ	W 16–2^{5}	15–1	
Feb 24	Miami (OH)*	Alberta B. Farrington Softball Stadium • Tempe, AZ	W 7–3	16–1	
Feb 29	Drake*	Alberta B. Farrington Softball Stadium • Tempe, AZ	W 10–0	17–1	
Feb 29	FIU*	Alberta B. Farrington Softball Stadium • Tempe, AZ	W 16–7^{5}	18–1	

March
Date	Opponent	Site/stadium	Score	Overall record	Pac-10 record
Mar 1	BYU*	Alberta B. Farrington Softball Stadium • Tempe, AZ	W 8–2	19–1	
Mar 1	Arkansas*	Alberta B. Farrington Softball Stadium • Tempe, AZ	W 6–5^{8}	20–1	
Mar 2	San Jose State*	Alberta B. Farrington Softball Stadium • Tempe, AZ	W 11–1^{5}	21–1	
Mar 4	Creighton*	Alberta B. Farrington Softball Stadium • Tempe, AZ	W 1–0^{10}	22–1	
Mar 7	Utah*	Alberta B. Farrington Softball Stadium • Tempe, AZ	W 9–0	23–1	
Mar 7	UC Davis*	Alberta B. Farrington Softball Stadium • Tempe, AZ	W 10–8	24–1	
Mar 8	San Diego State*	Alberta B. Farrington Softball Stadium • Tempe, AZ	W 3–1^{8}	25–1	
Mar 8	Pacific*	Alberta B. Farrington Softball Stadium • Tempe, AZ	W 10–3	26–1	
Mar 9	San Diego*	Alberta B. Farrington Softball Stadium • Tempe, AZ	W 14–0^{5}	27–1	
Mar 14	Santa Clara*	Alberta B. Farrington Softball Stadium • Tempe, AZ	W 8–0^{5}	28–1	
Mar 15	Santa Clara*	Alberta B. Farrington Softball Stadium • Tempe, AZ	W 13–8	29–1	
Mar 15	Santa Clara*	Alberta B. Farrington Softball Stadium • Tempe, AZ	W 11–0^{5}	30–1	
Mar 19	vs Utah*	Anderson Family Field • Fullerton, CA	W 3–0	31–1	
Mar 20	vs Florida State*	Anderson Family Field • Fullerton, CA	L 2–3	31–2	
Mar 20	vs Illinois*	Anderson Family Field • Fullerton, CA	W 7–2	32–2	
Mar 21	vs Louisiana–Lafayette*	Anderson Family Field • Fullerton, CA	W 3–1	33–2	
Mar 22	vs New Mexico*	Anderson Family Field • Fullerton, CA	W 4–2	34–2	
Mar 25	Marshall*	Alberta B. Farrington Softball Stadium • Tempe, AZ	W 5–0	35–2	
Mar 25	Marshall*	Alberta B. Farrington Softball Stadium • Tempe, AZ	W 13–1^{5}	36–2	
Mar 28	at California	Levine-Fricke Field • Berkeley, CA	W 4–2	37–2	1–0
Mar 29	at Stanford	Boyd & Jill Smith Family Stadium • Stanford, CA	W 6–0	38–2	2–0
Mar 30	at Stanford	Boyd & Jill Smith Family Stadium • Stanford, CA	W 3–0^{13}	39–2	3–0

April
Date	Opponent	Site/stadium	Score	Overall record	Pac-10 record
Apr 4	at Oregon	Howe Field • Eugene, OR	W 3–2	40–2	4–0
Apr 6	at Oregon State	Oregon State Softball Complex • Corvallis, OR	W 3–2	41–2	5–0
Apr 6	at Oregon State	Oregon State Softball Complex • Corvallis, OR	W 8–4	42–2	6–0
Apr 9	at Arizona	Rita Hillenbrand Memorial Stadium • Tucson, AZ	W 8–1	43–2	7–0
Apr 11	UCLA	Alberta B. Farrington Softball Stadium • Tempe, AZ	W 3–0	44–2	8–0
Apr 12	Washington	Alberta B. Farrington Softball Stadium • Tempe, AZ	W 7–2	45–2	9–0
Apr 13	Washington	Alberta B. Farrington Softball Stadium • Tempe, AZ	L 0–3	45–3	9–1
Apr 14	UNLV*	Alberta B. Farrington Softball Stadium • Tempe, AZ	W 6–5	46–3	
Apr 14	UNLV*	Alberta B. Farrington Softball Stadium • Tempe, AZ	W 14–7	47–3	
Apr 18	Arizona	Alberta B. Farrington Softball Stadium • Tempe, AZ	W 2–0	48–3	10–1
Apr 19	Arizona	Alberta B. Farrington Softball Stadium • Tempe, AZ	W 9–8	49–3	11–1
Apr 25	Oregon State	Alberta B. Farrington Softball Stadium • Tempe, AZ	W 4–1	50–3	12–1
Apr 26	Oregon	Alberta B. Farrington Softball Stadium • Tempe, AZ	W 6–1	51–3	13–1
Apr 27	Oregon	Alberta B. Farrington Softball Stadium • Tempe, AZ	W 9–0^{5}	52–3	14–1

May
Date	Opponent	Site/stadium	Score	Overall record	Pac-10 record
May 2	at Washington	Husky Softball Stadium • Seattle, WA	W 3–0	53–3	15–1
May 3	at UCLA	Easton Stadium • Los Angeles, CA	L 0–5	53–4	15–2
May 4	at UCLA	Easton Stadium • Los Angeles, CA	W 5–2	54–4	16–2
May 8	Stanford	Alberta B. Farrington Softball Stadium • Tempe, AZ	L 1–2^{10}	54–5	16–3
May 9	California	Alberta B. Farrington Softball Stadium • Tempe, AZ	W 4–2	55–5	17–3
May 10	California	Alberta B. Farrington Softball Stadium • Tempe, AZ	W 5–2	56–5	18–3

Postseason

NCAA Tempe Regional
Date	Opponent	Rank	Site/stadium	Score	Overall record	NCAAT record
May 16	Stony Brook	(6)	Alberta B. Farrington Softball Stadium • Tempe, AZ	W 2–0	57–5	1–0
May 17	Hawaii	(6)	Alberta B. Farrington Softball Stadium • Tempe, AZ	W 10–0	58–5	2–0
May 18	Hawaii	(6)	Alberta B. Farrington Softball Stadium • Tempe, AZ	W 8–0	59–5	3–0

NCAA Tempe Super Regional
Date	Opponent	Rank	Site/stadium	Score	Overall record	SR Record
May 23	(11) Northwestern	(6)	Alberta B. Farrington Softball Stadium • Tempe, AZ	W 3–1	60–5	1–0
May 24	(11) Northwestern	(6)	Alberta B. Farrington Softball Stadium • Tempe, AZ	W 9–0	61–5	2–0

NCAA Women's College World Series
Date	Opponent	Rank	Site/stadium	Score	Overall record	WCWS Record
May 29	(3) Alabama	(6)	ASA Hall of Fame Stadium • Oklahoma City, OK	W 3–1	62–5	1–0
May 30	(2) UCLA	(6)	ASA Hall of Fame Stadium • Oklahoma City, OK	W 4–0	63–5	2–0
June 1	(3) Alabama	(6)	ASA Hall of Fame Stadium • Oklahoma City, OK	W 3–1	64–5	3–0
June 2	(5) Texas A&M	(6)	ASA Hall of Fame Stadium • Oklahoma City, OK	W 3–0	65–5	4–0
June 3	(5) Texas A&M	(6)	ASA Hall of Fame Stadium • Oklahoma City, OK	W 11–0	66–5	5–0
