= 2008 NCAA Division I softball season =

American college softball season

- Defending Champions: Arizona

Tournament

Women's College World Series
- Champions: Arizona State (1st title)
- Runners-up: Texas A&M (7th WCWS Appearance)
- Winning Coach: Clint Myers (1st title)
- WCWS MOP: Katie Burkhart (Arizona State)

Seasons
- ← 2007 2009 →

The 2008 NCAA Division I softball season, play of college softball in the United States organized by the National Collegiate Athletic Association (NCAA) at the Division I level, began in February 2008. The season progressed through the regular season, many conference tournaments and championship series, and concluded with the 2008 NCAA Division I softball tournament and 2008 Women's College World Series. The Women's College World Series, consisting of the eight remaining teams in the NCAA Tournament and held in held in Oklahoma City at ASA Hall of Fame Stadium, ended on June 2, 2008.

== Conference standings ==
2008 Big 12 Conference softball standings
	Conf.						Overall
Team	W		L		T	PCT	W		L		T	PCT
No. 2 Texas A&M ‍†‍‍^{y}	17	–	1	–	0	.944	57	–	10	–	0	.851
No. 10 Oklahoma ‍‍‍^{y}	16	–	2	–	0	.889	47	–	14	–	0	.770
No. 19 Missouri ‍‍‡‍^{y}	11	–	6	–	0	.647	47	–	17	–	0	.734
Texas ‍‍‍^{y}	9	–	9	–	0	.500	29	–	23	–	2	.556
Oklahoma State ‍‍‍	9	–	9	–	0	.500	26	–	25	–	0	.510
Texas Tech ‍‍‍	8	–	10	–	0	.444	23	–	36	–	0	.390
Kansas ‍‍‍	7	–	11	–	0	.389	37	–	19	–	0	.661
Baylor ‍‍‍	4	–	13	–	0	.235	23	–	22	–	0	.511
Iowa State ‍‍‍	4	–	14	–	0	.222	29	–	29	–	0	.500
Nebraska ‍‍‍	4	–	14	–	0	.222	25	–	28	–	0	.472
† – Conference champion ‡ – Tournament champion y – Invited to the NCAA tournament Rankings from NFCA

2008 Big Ten Conference softball standings
	Conf.				Overall
Team	W		L	PCT	W		L	PCT
No. 9 Michigan ‍†‍‍^{y}	18	–	2	.900	52	–	8	.867
No. 12 Northwestern ‍‍‡‍^{y}	18	–	2	.900	40	–	16	.714
Iowa ‍‍‍^{y}	14	–	6	.700	42	–	20	.677
Minnesota ‍‍‍	9	–	7	.563	29	–	16	.644
Purdue ‍‍‍^{y}	9	–	9	.500	35	–	23	.603
Illinois ‍‍‍	8	–	12	.400	30	–	32	.484
Michigan State ‍‍‍	8	–	12	.400	27	–	29	.482
Ohio State ‍‍‍	7	–	13	.350	33	–	23	.589
Penn State ‍‍‍	6	–	12	.333	34	–	22	.607
Indiana ‍‍‍	6	–	14	.300	16	–	35	.314
Wisconsin ‍‍‍	3	–	17	.150	15	–	40	.273
† – Conference champion ‡ – Tournament champion y – Invited to the NCAA tournament As of May 25, 2008; Rankings from NFCA

2008 Pacific-10 Conference softball standings
	Conf.						Overall
Team	W		L		T	PCT	W		L		T	PCT
Arizona State ‍†‍‍^{y}	18	–	3	–	0	.857	66	–	5	–	0	.930
UCLA ‍‍‍^{y}	17	–	4	–	0	.810	51	–	9	–	0	.850
Arizona ‍‍‍^{y}	13	–	8	–	0	.619	41	–	19	–	0	.683
Stanford ‍‍‍^{y}	11	–	10	–	0	.524	49	–	15	–	0	.766
California ‍‍‍^{y}	7	–	14	–	0	.333	43	–	27	–	0	.614
Washington ‍‍‍^{y}	7	–	14	–	0	.333	30	–	25	–	1	.545
Oregon State ‍‍‍	6	–	15	–	0	.286	28	–	31	–	0	.475
Oregon ‍‍‍^{y}	5	–	16	–	0	.238	35	–	29	–	0	.547
† – Conference champion y – Invited to the NCAA tournament As of July 30, 2008; Rankings from Coaches' Poll

2008 Southland Conference softball standings
	Conf.						Overall
Team	W		L		T	PCT	W		L		T	PCT
Texas State ‍†‍‍	25	–	5	–	0	.833	35	–	18	–	0	.660
Texas–Arlington ‍‍‍	20	–	10	–	0	.667	27	–	22	–	0	.551
Texas–San Antonio ‍‍‍	20	–	10	–	0	.667	25	–	25	–	0	.500
Stephen F. Austin ‍‍‍^{y}	18	–	11	–	0	.621	36	–	25	–	0	.590
Nicholls State ‍‍‍	15	–	14	–	0	.517	31	–	28	–	0	.525
McNeese State ‍‍‍	15	–	14	–	0	.517	23	–	36	–	0	.390
Sam Houston State ‍‍‍	15	–	15	–	0	.500	30	–	31	–	0	.492
Southeastern Louisiana ‍‍‍	14	–	15	–	0	.483	27	–	25	–	0	.519
Texas A&M–Corpus Christi ‍‍‍	11	–	19	–	0	.367	21	–	32	–	0	.396
Northwestern State ‍‍‍	5	–	24	–	0	.172	10	–	45	–	0	.182
Central Arkansas ‍‍‍	4	–	25	–	0	.138	6	–	43	–	0	.122
† – Conference champion y – Invited to the NCAA tournament As of May 20, 2008; Rankings from Coaches' Poll

2008 Sun Belt Conference softball standings
	Conf.				Overall
Team	W		L	PCT	W		L	PCT
No. 6 Louisiana–Lafayette ‍†‍‡‍^{y}	19	–	3	.864	52	–	15	.776
Florida Atlantic ‍‍‍	17	–	7	.708	35	–	26	.574
Troy ‍‍‍	14	–	9	.609	33	–	23	.589
FIU ‍‍‍	12	–	11	.522	29	–	34	.460
Middle Tennessee ‍‍‍	11	–	12	.478	22	–	31	.415
North Texas ‍‍‍	9	–	15	.375	27	–	33	.450
Louisiana–Monroe ‍‍‍	9	–	15	.375	22	–	37	.373
Western Kentucky ‍‍‍	8	–	15	.348	28	–	30	.483
South Alabama ‍‍‍	6	–	18	.250	22	–	31	.415
† – Conference champion ‡ – Tournament champion y – Invited to the NCAA tournament As of June 2008; Rankings from

== Women's College World Series ==
The 2008 NCAA Women's College World Series took place from May 29 to June 2, 2008 in Oklahoma City.

First round
1	Florida	2
Louisiana–Lafayette	3
5	Texas A&M	1
Virginia Tech	0
1	Florida	2
Virginia Tech	0
3	Alabama	1
6	Arizona State	3
2	UCLA	1
7	Arizona	0
3	Alabama	5
7	Arizona	1

Second round
Louisiana–Lafayette	1
5	Texas A&M	2
1	Florida	2
2	UCLA	0
6	Arizona State	4
2	UCLA	0
3	Alabama	3
Louisiana–Lafayette	1

Semifinals
5	Texas A&M	1	1
1	Florida	6	0
6	Arizona State	3	—
3	Alabama	1	—

Finals
5	Texas A&M	0	0	—
6	Arizona State	3	11	—

== Season leaders ==
Batting

- Batting average: .480 – Nichole Alvarez, Monmouth Hawks
- RBIs: 79 – Charlotte Morgan, Alabama Crimson Tide
- Home runs: 27 – Steph Fischer, Tennessee Tech Golden Eagles

Pitching

- Wins: 47-5 – Stacey Nelson, Florida Gators
- ERA: 0.63 (31 ER/344.0 IP) – Angela Tincher Virginia Tech Hokies
- Strikeouts: 679 – Angela Tincher Virginia Tech Hokies

== Records ==
NCAA Division I season saves: 15 – Mallory Aldred, Canisius Golden Griffins

NCAA Division I single game doubles: 4 – Emily Troup, North Carolina Tar Heels; February 20, 2008

Junior class wins: 47 – Stacey Nelson, Florida Gators

Team wins: 70 – Florida Gators

== Awards ==
- USA Softball Collegiate Player of the Year:

Angela Tincher Virginia Tech Hokies

- Honda Sports Award Softball:

Angela Tincher Virginia Tech Hokies

YEAR	W	L	GP	GS	CG	SHO	SV	IP	H	R	ER	BB	SO	ERA	WHIP
2008	38	10	56	44	37	17	2	344.0	130	46	31	75	679	0.63	0.59

== All America Teams ==
The following players were members of the All-American Teams.

First Team

Position	Player	Class	School
P	Stacey Nelson	JR.	Florida Gators
P	Angela Tincher	SR.	Virginia Tech Hokies
P	Anjelica Selden	SR.	UCLA Bruins
C	Chelsea Bramlett	SO.	Mississippi State Bulldogs
1B	Alexandra Gardiner	JR.	Florida Gators
2B	Samantha Findlay	SR.	Michigan Wolverines
3B	Tonya Callahan	SR.	Tennessee Lady Vols
SS	Tammy Williams	JR.	Northwestern Wildcats
OF	Brittany Rogers	JR.	Alabama Crimson Tide
OF	Holly Tankersley	SR.	ULL Ragin' Cajuns
OF	Kaitlin Cochran	JR.	Arizona State Sun Devils
UT	Megan Gibson	SR.	Texas A&M Aggies
UT	Lauren Grill	SO.	Mississippi Rebels
UT	Katie Burkhart	SR.	Arizona State Sun Devils
AT-L	Courtney Bures	SR.	Mississippi State Bulldogs
AT-L	GiOnna DiSalvatore	FR.	UCLA Bruins
AT-L	Kelly Montalvo	JR.	Alabama Crimson Tide
AT-L	Charlotte Morgan	SO.	Alabama Crimson Tide

Second Team

Position	Player	Class	School
P	Angel Shamblin	SR.	Houston Cougars
P	Jordan Taylor	FR.	Michigan Wolverines
P	Brooke Turner	FR.	Long Beach State 49ers
C	Noelle Micka	FR.	Nevada Wolfpack
1B	Steph Fischer	SR.	Tennessee Tech Golden Eagles
2B	Aja Paculba	FR.	Florida Gators
3B	Amber Patton	JR.	DePaul Blue Demons
SS	Savannah Long	SR.	Oklahoma Sooners
OF	Alessandra Giampaolo	SR.	Michigan Wolverines
OF	Lisa Kingsmore	JR.	Winthrop Eagles
OF	Rhea Taylor	FR.	Missouri Tigers
UT	Danielle Spaulding	SO.	North Carolina Tar Heels
UT	Kiki Munoz	SR.	Cal State Fullerton Titans
AT-L	Mindy Cowles	SR.	Arizona State Sun Devils
AT-L	Francesca Enea	SO.	Florida Gators
AT-L	Amber Flores	SO.	Oklahoma Sooners
AT-L	D.J. Mathis	JR.	Oklahoma Sooners
AT-L	Morgan Melloh	FR.	Fresno State Bulldogs

Third Team

Position	Player	Class	School
P	Kelsi Dunne	FR.	Alabama Crimson Tide
P	Nikki Nemitz	SO.	Michigan Wolverines
P	Missy Penna	JR.	Stanford Cardinal
C	Rachel Folden	SR.	Marshall Thundering Herd
1B	Laine Roth	JR.	Arizona Wildcats
2B	Amanda Kamekona	SR.	UCLA Bruins
3B	Brette Reagan	JR.	Baylor Bears
SS	Jessica Valis	JR.	Houston Cougars
OF	Alissa Haber	SO.	Stanford Cardinal
OF	Jackie Vasquez	SR.	Arizona State Sun Devils
OF	Laurie Wagner	JR.	Houston Cougars
UT	Megan Langenfeld	SO.	UCLA Bruins
UT	Brittany Vanderink	SR.	Ohio State Buckeyes
AT-L	Krista Donnenwirth	FR.	Arizona State Sun Devils
AT-L	Jamie Hinshaw	SR.	Texas A&M Aggies
AT-L	Brittany Lastrapes	FR.	Arizona Wildcats
AT-L	Jamie Lettire	SO.	Princeton Tigers
AT-L	Kim Waleszonia	JR.	Florida Gators
