= 2008 Big 12 Conference softball tournament =

- Teams: 10
- Finals site: ASA Hall of Fame Stadium; Oklahoma City, OK
- Champions: Texas A&M (1st title)
- Runner-up: Nebraska (4th title game)
- Winning coach: Jo Evans (1st title)
- MVP: Megan Gibson (Texas A&M)
- Attendance: 3,942

2008 Big 12 Conference softball standings
	Conf.						Overall
Team	W		L		T	PCT	W		L		T	PCT
No. 2 Texas A&M ‍†‍‍^{y}	17	–	1	–	0	.944	57	–	10	–	0	.851
No. 10 Oklahoma ‍‍‍^{y}	16	–	2	–	0	.889	47	–	14	–	0	.770
No. 19 Missouri ‍‍‡‍^{y}	11	–	6	–	0	.647	47	–	17	–	0	.734
Texas ‍‍‍^{y}	9	–	9	–	0	.500	29	–	23	–	2	.556
Oklahoma State ‍‍‍	9	–	9	–	0	.500	26	–	25	–	0	.510
Texas Tech ‍‍‍	8	–	10	–	0	.444	23	–	36	–	0	.390
Kansas ‍‍‍	7	–	11	–	0	.389	37	–	19	–	0	.661
Baylor ‍‍‍	4	–	13	–	0	.235	23	–	22	–	0	.511
Iowa State ‍‍‍	4	–	14	–	0	.222	29	–	29	–	0	.500
Nebraska ‍‍‍	4	–	14	–	0	.222	25	–	28	–	0	.472
† – Conference champion ‡ – Tournament champion y – Invited to the NCAA tournament Rankings from NFCA

The 2008 Big 12 Conference softball tournament was held at ASA Hall of Fame Stadium in Oklahoma City, OK from May 9 through May 11, 2008. Texas A&M won their first conference tournament and earned the Big 12 Conference's automatic bid to the 2008 NCAA Division I softball tournament.

Texas A&M, Oklahoma, Missouri and Texas received bids to the NCAA tournament. Texas A&M would go on to play in the 2008 Women's College World Series.

== Standings ==
Place	Seed	Team	Conference				Overall			
Place	Seed	Team	W	L	T	%	W	L	T	%
1	1	Texas A&M	17	1	0	.944	57	10	0	.851
2	2	Oklahoma	16	2	0	.889	47	14	0	.770
3	3	Missouri	11	6	0	.647	47	17	0	.734
4	4	Texas	9	9	0	.500	29	23	2	.556
4	5	Oklahoma State	9	9	0	.500	26	25	0	.510
6	6	Texas Tech	8	10	0	.444	23	36	0	.390
7	7	Kansas	7	11	0	.389	37	19	0	.661
8	8	Baylor	4	13	0	.235	23	22	0	.511
9	9	Iowa State	4	14	0	.222	29	29	0	.500
9	10	Nebraska	4	14	0	.222	25	28	0	.472

== Schedule ==
Game	Time	Matchup	Location	Attendance
Day 1 – Friday, May 9
1	5:00 p.m.	#10 Nebraska 4, #7 Kansas 3	Hall of Fame Stadium	709
2	5:00 p.m.	#9 Iowa State 6, #8 Baylor 4 (10)	Field 4	702
Day 2 – Saturday, May 10
3	11:00 a.m.	#10 Nebraska 6, #2 Oklahoma 5	Hall of Fame Stadium	1,638
4	11:30 a.m.	#6 Texas Tech 5, #3 Missouri 3	Field 4	1,638
5	2:00 p.m.	#1 Texas A&M 1, #9 Iowa State 0 (9)	Hall of Fame Stadium	1,638
6	2:23 p.m.	#4 Texas 4, #5 Oklahoma State 3 (9)	Field 4	1,638
7	4:38 p.m.	#10 Nebraska 6, #6 Texas Tech 1	Hall of Fame Stadium	859
8	7:37 p.m.	#1 Texas A&M 3, #4 Texas 1 (11)	Hall of Fame Stadium	859
Day 3 – Sunday, May 11
9	12:00 p.m.	#1 Texas A&M 5, #10 Nebraska 0	Hall of Fame Stadium	736
Game times in CDT. Rankings denote tournament seed.

== All-Tournament Team ==
Position	Player	School
MOP	Megan Gibson	Texas A&M
3B	Jamie Hinshaw	Texas A&M
SS	Holly Ridley	Texas A&M
IF	Brette Reagan	Baylor
IF	Samantha Ricketts	Oklahoma
IF	Crystal Carwile	Nebraska
IF	Haley Long	Nebraska
C	Erin Glasco	Texas A&M
C/IF	Jennifer Corkin	Texas Tech
OF	Meghan Mullin	Nebraska
OF	Devin Zargoza	Texas Tech
P/1B	Megan Gibson	Texas A&M
P	Rachel Zabriskie	Iowa State
P	Molly Hill	Nebraska
