= 2008 Tennessee Lady Volunteers softball team =

American college softball season

2008 Tennessee Lady Volunteers softball
- Conference: Southeastern Conference
- East
- Record: 50–16 (14–12 SEC)
- Head coach: Ralph Weekly; Karen Weekly
- Assistant coach: Marty McDaniel; Mark Weekly
- Home stadium: Sherri Parker Lee Stadium

The 2008 Tennessee Lady Volunteers softball team was an American softball team, representing the University of Tennessee for the 2008 NCAA softball season. The team played their home games at Sherri Parker Lee Stadium. The team's season was cut short by Angela Tincher and the Virginia Tech Hokies in the Knoxville Regional, failing to qualify for the Women's College World Series for the first time since 2004.

== Roster ==
2008 Tennessee Lady Volunteers roster
| Pitchers: 3 Ashton Ward – freshman; 5 Danielle Pieroni – junior; 10 Megan Rhodes – senior; Outfielders: 1 Kelsey Stander – freshman; 2 Kelly Grieve – freshman; 14 Erinn Webb – sophomore; 17 Lillian Hammond – junior; 18 Anita Manuma – sophomore; 52 Tiffany Huff – sophomore | Catchers: 35 Shannon Doepking – senior; Infielders: 00 Nicole Kajitani – sophomore; 6 Natalee Weissinger - RS Freshman; 8 Kenora Posey – senior; 9 Caitlin Ryan – senior; 12 Allison Fulmer – junior; 16 Jennifer Lapicki – freshman; 35 Tonya Callahan – senior |

== Schedule ==
| Date | Time | Opponent | Rank^{#} | Site | Result | Attendance | Winning Pitcher | Losing Pitcher |
|---|---|---|---|---|---|---|---|---|
| February 8* | 8:30 PM | Utah State Aggies | #6 | Big League Dreams • Palm Springs, CA | W 8-0^{(5)} | 142 | A. Ward | S. Ellingsworth |
| February 8* | 11:00 PM | UC Davis Aggies | #6 | Big League Dreams • Palm Springs, CA | W 5-2 | 134 | M. Rhodes | J. Hancock |
| February 9* | 3:30 PM | #20 Oregon Ducks | #6 | Big League Dreams • Palm Springs, CA | W 5-0 | 221 | A. Ward | A. Cook |
| February 9* | 9:00 PM | Cal Poly Mustangs | #6 | Big League Dreams • Palm Springs, CA | W 8-0^{(5)} | - | M. Rhodes | H. Pena |
| February 10* | 12:30 PM | Oregon St. Beavers | #6 | Big League Dreams • Palm Springs, CA | W 8-1 | - | A. Ward | K. Dyer |
USF Tournament
| February 16* | 4:00 PM | Florida Gulf Coast Eagles | #4 | USF Softball Stadium • Tampa, FL | W 6-2 | 304 | A. Ward | D. Frantz |
| February 16* | 8:00 PM | Hofstra Pride | #4 | USF Softball Stadium • Tampa, FL | W 6-1 | - | M. Rhodes | K. Lotti |
| February 17* | 2:00 PM | South Florida Bulls | #4 | USF Softball Stadium • Tampa, FL | L 1-4 | - | C. Mosch | A. Ward |
| February 17* | 11:30 PM | Ole Miss Rebels | #4 | USF Softball Stadium • Tampa, FL | W 2-0 | 197 | A. Ward | T. Willitt |
| February 18* | 9:30 AM | Florida A&M Rattlers | #2 | USF Softball Stadium • Tampa, FL | W 5-1 | - | A. Ward | T. Chan |
Tennessee Classic
| February 21* | 5:00 PM | BYU Cougars | #5 | Lee Stadium • Knoxville, TN | W 8-2 | 495 | A. Ward | C. Trice |
| February 22* | 7:30 PM | Virginia Cavaliers | #5 | Lee Stadium • Knoxville, TN | W 8-0^{(5)} | - | M. Rhodes | K. Wilburn |
| February 23* | 2:30 PM | Wagner Seahawks | #5 | Lee Stadium • Knoxville, TN | W 14-0^{(5)} | - | M. Rhodes | D. Wagoner |
| February 23* | 5:00 PM | ULM Warhawks | #5 | Lee Stadium • Knoxville, TN | W 4-0 | 729 | A. Ward | K. Causey |
| February 24* | 12:00 PM | Virginia Cavaliers | #5 | Lee Stadium • Knoxville, TN | W 5-1 | - | A. Ward | K. Wilburn |
NFCA Leadoff Classic
| February 29* | 11:00 AM | Charlotte 49ers | #4 | South Commons • Columbus GA | W 8-4 | - | M. Rhodes | K. Hackett |
| February 29* | 4:00 PM | Hofstra Pride | #4 | South Commons • Columbus, GA | W 5-2 | - | M. Rhodes | S. Michalowski |
| March 1* | 11:00 AM | Florida St. Seminoles | #4 | South Commons • Columbus, GA | W 8-5 | - | A. Ward | T. Gober |
| March 1* | 4:00 PM | Illinois St. Redbirds | #4 | South Commons • Columbus, GA | W 5-2 | - | A. Ward | R. Smith |
| March 2* | 10:00 AM | Nebraska Cornhuskers | #4 | South Commons • Columbus, GA | W 9-0^{(6)} | - | M. Rhodes | M. Hill |
| March 5* | 6:00 PM | Tennessee Tech Golden Eagles | #4 | Lee Stadium • Knoxville, TN | W 1-0 | 759 | A. Ward | S. Street |
| March 8 | 2:00 PM | #2 Alabama Crimson Tide | #4 | Rhoads Stadium • Tuscaloosa, AL | L 0-8^{(6)} | 2,252 | K. Dunne | A. Ward |
| March 9 | 1:30 PM | #2 Alabama Crimson Tide | #4 | Rhoads Stadium • Tuscaloosa, AL | L 2-13^{(5)} | 2,245 | C. Owens | M. Rhodes |
| March 9 | 4:00 PM | #2 Alabama Crimson Tide | #4 | Rhoads Stadium • Tuscaloosa, AL | W 7-3 | 2,245 | M. Rhodes | K. Dunne |
| March 12* | 5:00 PM | Tennessee St. Tigers | #6 | Lee Stadium • Knoxville, TN | W 9-1^{(6)} | 661 | M. Rhodes | A. Vaught |
| March 12* | 7:30 PM | Tennessee St. Tigers | #6 | Lee Stadium • Knoxville, TN | W 4-1 | 661 | A. Ward | A. Vaught |
| March 15 | 6:00 PM | Kentucky Wildcats | #6 | Lee Stadium • Knoxville, TN | L 0-2 | 725 | A. Matousek | M. Rhodes |
| March 16 | 1:00 PM | Kentucky Wildcats | #6 | Lee Stadium • Knoxville, TN | W 5-1 | 683 | A. Ward | J. Young |
| March 16 | 3:30 PM | Kentucky Wildcats | #6 | Lee Stadium • Knoxville, TN | W 2-0 | 683 | M. Rhodes | A. Matousek |
| March 19 | 3:00 PM | South Carolina Gamecocks | #8 | Beckham Field • Columbia, SC | W 2-0^{(9)} | - | A. Ward | M. Hendon |
| March 19 | 5:30 PM | South Carolina Gamecocks | #8 | Beckham Field • Columbia, SC | Canceled | - | - | - |
| March 21 | 5:00 PM | Arkansas Razorbacks | #8 | Lady Back Yard • Fayetteville, AR | L 2-5 | - | K. Henry | A. Ward |
| March 21 | 7:30 PM | Arkansas Razorbacks | #8 | Lady Back Yard • Fayetteville, AR | W 11-2 | - | M. Rhodes | K. Henry |
| March 22 | 12:00 PM | Arkansas Razorbacks | #8 | Lady Back Yard • Fayetteville, AR | W 4-2 | - | M. Rhodes | K. Henry |
| March 25* | 5:00 PM | Lipscomb Bison | #9 | Lee Stadium • Knoxville, TN | W 8-0^{(5)} | 605 | A. Ward | C. Campbell |
| March 25* | 7:30 PM | Lipscomb Bison | #9 | Lee Stadium • Knoxville, TN | W 4-1 | 605 | M. Rhodes | A. Jacobson |
| March 29 | 5:00 PM | Auburn Tigers | #9 | Jane B. Moore Field • Auburn, AL | W 8-4 | 817 | A. Ward | A. Thompson |
| March 29 | 7:30 PM | Auburn Tigers | #9 | Jane B. Moore Field • Auburn, AL | L 0-1 | 817 | B. Day | M. Rhodes |
| March 30 | 12:00 PM | Auburn Tigers | #9 | Jane B. Moore Field • Auburn, AL | L 1-2^{(8)} | 521 | A. Thompson | M. Rhodes |
| April 2* | 5:00 PM | ETSU Buccaneers | #12 | Lee Stadium • Knoxville, TN | W 4-3 | 574 | A. Ward | M. Hardy |
| April 2* | 7:30 PM | ETSU Buccaneers | #12 | Lee Stadium • Knoxville, TN | W 7-0 | 574 | A. Ward | M. Hardy |
| April 5 | 1:00 PM | #14 Georgia Bulldogs | #12 | Lee Stadium • Knoxville, TN | W 6-4 | 1,162 | M. Rhodes | S. McCloud |
| April 5 | 3:30 PM | #14 Georgia Bulldogs | #12 | Lee Stadium • Knoxville, TN | W 9-0^{(6)} | 1,162 | M. Rhodes | K. Gaskill |
| April 6 | 12:00 PM | #14 Georgia Bulldogs | #12 | Lee Stadium • Knoxville, TN | W 5-1 | 878 | M. Rhodes | T. Schlopy |
| April 8* | 3:30 PM | Liberty Flames | #10 | Lee Stadium • Knoxville, TN | W 8-2 | 476 | M. Rhodes | S. Ellis |
| April 8* | 6:00 PM | Liberty Flames | #10 | Lee Stadium • Knoxville, TN | W 7-1 | 476 | A. Ward | D. Wheeler |
| April 9* | 4:00 PM | Western Carolina Catamounts | #10 | Lee Stadium • Knoxville, TN | W 11-0^{(5)} | 497 | M. Rhodes | L. Ross |
| April 9* | 6:30 PM | Western Carolina Catamounts | #10 | Lee Stadium • Knoxville, TN | W 11-3^{(5)} | 497 | A. Ward | M. Tating |
| April 12 | 3:00 PM | #1 United States Olympic Team (Exhibition) | #10 | Lee Stadium • Knoxville, TN | L 2-4 | 1,622 | M. Abbott | D. Pieroni |
| April 16 | 3:00 PM | Ole Miss Rebels | #9 | Lee Stadium • Knoxville, TN | L 0-1 | - | T. Willitt | M. Rhodes |
| April 16 | 5:30 PM | Ole Miss Rebels | #9 | Lee Stadium • Knoxville, TN | W 6-2 | - | A. Ward | B. Nye |
| April 19 | 1:00 PM | #11 LSU Tigers | #9 | Lee Stadium • Knoxville, TN | W 8-0^{(5)} | 1,066 | A. Ward | D. Hofer |
| April 19 | 3:30 PM | #11 LSU Tigers | #9 | Lee Stadium • Knoxville, TN | L 2-8 | 1,066 | C. Trahan | M. Rhodes |
| April 20 | 1:00 PM | #11 LSU Tigers | #9 | Lee Stadium • Knoxville, TN | W 5-4 | - | A. Ward | T. Garcia |
| April 22* | 2:00 PM | Austin Peay Govs | #10 | Lee Stadiym • Knoxville, TN | W 9-1^{(5)} | - | A. Ward | A. Mabry |
| April 22* | 4:30 PM | Austin Peay Govs | #10 | Lee Stadium • Knoxville, TN | W 14-1^{(5)} | - | A. Ward | M. Williams |
| April 26 | 4:00 PM | #23 Mississippi St. Bulldogs | #10 | MSU Softball Field • Starkville, MS | L 1-2 | 507 | M. Flesher | A. Ward |
| April 26 | 6:30 PM | #23 Mississippi St. Bulldogs | #10 | MSU Softball Field • Starkville, MS | W 8-6 | 507 | A. Ward | K. Nurnberg |
| April 27 | 2:00 PM | #23 Mississippi St. Bulldogs | #10 | MSU Softball Field • Starkville, MS | Canceled | - | - | - |
| May 3 | 4:00 PM | #2 Florida Gators | #12 | Lee Stadium • Knoxville, TN | L 2-4 | 1,164 | S. Nelson | A. Ward |
| May 3 | 6:30 PM | #2 Florida Gators | #12 | Lee Stadium • Knoxville, TN | L 5-6^{(11)} | 1,164 | S. Nelson | M. Rhodes |
| May 4 | 1:00 PM | #2 Florida Gators | #12 | Lee Stadium • Knoxville, TN | L 3-5 | 1,157 | S. Nelson | M. Rhodes |
SEC Tournament
| May 8 | 12:00 PM | #25 Georgia Bulldogs | #14 | Tiger Park • Baton Rouge, LA | W 5-2 | - | M. Rhodes | C. Hamilton |
| May 9 | 5:00 PM | #1 Florida Gators | #14 | Tiger Park • Baton Rouge, LA | L 1-6 | - | S. Nelson | M. Rhodes |
NCAA Knoxville Regional
| May 16 | 5:00 PM | Winthrop Eagles | #13 | Lee Stadium • Knoxville, TN | W 3-0 | 628 | M. Rhodes | C. Woolridge |
| May 17 | 12:00 PM | #17 Virginia Tech Hokies | #13 | Lee Stadium • Knoxville, TN | L 0-2 | 668 | A. Tincher | M. Rhodes |
| May 17 | 6:30 PM | Louisville Cardinals | #13 | Lee Stadium • Knoxville, TN | W 8-1 | 668 | M. Rhodes | K. Wadwell |
| May 18 | 3:00 PM | #17 Virginia Tech Hokies | #13 | Lee Stadium • Knoxville, TN | W 7-1 | 637 | M. Rhodes | A. Tincher |
| May 18 | 5:30 PM | #17 Virginia Tech Hokies | #13 | Lee Stadium • Knoxville, TN | L 0-4 | 637 | A. Tincher | M. Rhodes |
*Non-Conference Game. ^{#}Rankings from NFCA released prior to game.All times are in Eastern Time Zone.
