= 2008 NCAA Division I softball tournament =

College softball tournament

- Teams: 64
- Finals site: ASA Hall of Fame Stadium; Oklahoma City
- Champions: Arizona State (1st NCAA (3rd overall) title)
- Runner-up: Texas A&M (7th WCWS Appearance)
- Winning coach: Clint Myers (1st title)
- MOP: Katie Burkhart (Arizona State)

The 2008 NCAA Division I softball tournament was held from May 15 through June 4, 2008. 64 NCAA Division I college softball teams met after having played their way through a regular season, and for some, a conference tournament, to play in the NCAA Tournament. The tournament culminated with eight teams playing in the 2008 Women's College World Series at ASA Hall of Fame Stadium in Oklahoma City, Oklahoma.

== National seeds ==
Bold indicates WCWS participant.

1. **Florida**
2. **UCLA**
3. **Alabama**
4. Michigan
5. **Texas A&M**
6. **Arizona State**
7. **Arizona**
8. Houston
9. LSU
10. Oklahoma
11. Northwestern
12. Stanford
13. Tennessee
14. Long Beach State
15. Georgia
16. Fresno State

== Regionals and super regionals ==
Bold indicates winner. * indicates host.

=== Gainesville Super Regional ===
First round	Second round
1	**Florida**	**7**
Georgia Tech	2
1	**Florida**	**3**
UCF	0
**UCF**	**3**
South Florida	2
Gainesville, FL Regional
**Georgia Tech**	**9**
South Florida	2
Georgia Tech	1
**UCF**	**7**
16	**Fresno State**	**11**
Sacramento State	0
16	Fresno State	0
**California**	**3**
San Diego State	1
**California**	**4**
Fresno, CA Regional
Sacramento State	1
**San Diego State**	**7**
San Diego State	0
16	**Fresno State**	**2**

Regional finals
1	**Florida**	0	**10**
UCF	**1**	0
**California**	2	**7**
16	Fresno State	**3**	6

Super regionals
1	**Florida**	**4**	**4**	—
California	2	2	—

=== Houston Super Regional ===
First round	Second round
9	**LSU**	**8**
Mississippi Valley State	0
9	LSU	4
**Louisiana−Lafayette**	**9**
East Carolina	1
**Louisiana–Lafayette**	**2**
Baton Rouge, LA Regional
Mississippi Valley State	2
**East Carolina**	**4**
East Carolina	1
9	**LSU**	**9**
8	**Houston**	**9**
Delaware State	0
8	**Houston**	**2**
Washington	0
**Washington**	**2**
Texas	1
Houston, TX Regional
Delaware State	2
**Texas**	**3**
Texas	3
**Washington**	**5**

Regional finals
**Louisiana−Lafayette**	**6**	—
9	LSU	3	—
8	**Houston**	**2**	—
Washington	1	—

Super regionals
**Louisiana−Lafayette**	**6**	3	**4**
8	Houston	4	**6**	0

=== College Station Super Regional ===
First round	Second round
5	**Texas A&M**	**2**
Stephen F. Austin	0
5	**Texas A&M**	**4**
Louisiana Tech	0
**Louisiana Tech**	**1**
Auburn	0
College Station, TX Regional
Stephen F. Austin	0
**Auburn**	**2**
Auburn	1
**Louisiana Tech**	**2**
12	**Stanford**	**4**
Lehigh	0
12	**Stanford**	**3**
UMass	0
**UMass**	**6**
Princeton	0
Amherst, MA Regional
**Lehigh**	**7**
Princeton	4
Lehigh	1
**UMass**	**3**

Regional finals
5	**Texas A&M**	**6**	—
Louisiana Tech	0	—
12	**Stanford**	1	**6**
UMass	**2**	0

Super regionals
5	**Texas A&M**	**6**	**9**	—
12	Stanford	1	4	—

=== Ann Arbor Super Regional ===
First round	Second round
13	**Tennessee**	**3**
Winthrop	0
13	Tennessee	0
**Virginia Tech**	**4**
Louisville	0
**Virginia Tech**	**1**
Knoxville, TN Regional
Winthrop	1
**Louisville**	**4**
13	**Tennessee**	**8**
Louisville	1
4	**Michigan**	**13**
Wright State	5
4	**Michigan**	**8**
Notre Dame	0
**Notre Dame**	**9**
Kent State	1
Ann Arbor, MI Regional
Wright State	2
**Kent State**	**3**
Notre Dame	5
**Kent State**	**7**

Regional finals
**Virginia Tech**	1	**4**
13	Tennessee	**7**	2
4	**Michigan**	**5**	—
Kent State	0	—

Super regionals
**Virginia Tech**	0	**1**	**6**
4	Michigan	**1**	0	1

=== Tuscaloosa Super Regional ===
First round	Second round
3	**Alabama**	**8**
Chattanooga	0
3	**Alabama**	**10**
Jacksonville State	1
**Jacksonville State**	**4**
Florida State	3
Tuscaloosa, AL Regional
Chattanooga	3
**Florida State**	**5**
**Jacksonville State**	**10**
Florida State	1
14	**Long Beach State**	**2**
Creighton	1
14	Long Beach State	3
**Missouri**	**5**
**Missouri**	**3**
Iowa	2
Iowa City, IA Regional
Creighton	1
**Iowa**	**2**
**Iowa**	**5**
14	Long Beach State	2

Regional finals
3	**Alabama**	**4**	—
Jacksonville State	1	—
**Missouri**	**5**	—
Iowa	4	—

Super regionals
3	**Alabama**	**6**	**7**	—
Missouri	1	1	—

=== Tempe Super Regional ===
First round	Second round
11	**Northwestern**	**6**
Western Illinois	0
11	**Northwestern**	**6**
DePaul	0
Drake	1
**DePaul**	**3**
Evanston, IL Regional
Drake	1
**Western Illinois**	**3**
Western Illinois	0
**DePaul**	**6**
6	**Arizona State**	**2**
Stony Brook	0
6	**Arizona State**	**10**
Hawaii	0
Mississippi State	7
**Hawaii**	**9**
Tempe, AZ Regional
Stony Brook	3
**Mississippi State**	**8**
Mississippi State	4
**Hawaii**	**7**

Regional finals
11	**Northwestern**	2	**3**
DePaul	**3**	2
6	**Arizona State**	**8**	—
Hawaii	0	—

Super regionals
11	Northwestern	1	0	—
6	**Arizona State**	**3**	**9**	—

=== Tucson Super Regional ===
First round	Second round
7	**Arizona**	**11**
Canisius	0
7	**Arizona**	**10**
Hofstra	0
Long Island	0
**Hofstra**	**1**
Hempstead, NY Regional
**Canisius**	**3**
Long Island	2
Canisius	1
**Hofstra**	**5**
10	**Oklahoma**	**6**
Oregon	0
10	**Oklahoma**	**6**
Arkansas	5
**Arkansas**	**7**
Tulsa	5
Norman, OK Regional
**Oregon**	**1**
Tulsa	0
**Oregon**	**3**
Arkansas	0

Regional finals
7	**Arizona**	**5**	—
Hofstra	0	—
10	**Oklahoma**	**11**	—
Oregon	0	—

Super regionals
7	**Arizona**	**3**	0	**5**
10	Oklahoma	1	**2**	2

=== Los Angeles Super Regional ===
First round	Second round
15	**Georgia**	**9**
Campbell	0
15	**Georgia**	**9**
BYU	3
**BYU**	**3**
North Carolina	0
Chapel Hill, NC Regional
**Campbell**	**7**
North Carolina	6
**BYU**	**1**
Campbell	0
2	**UCLA**	**8**
Cal State Fullerton	3
2	**UCLA**	**6**
Nevada	4
**Nevada**	**4**
Purdue	1
Los Angeles Regional
Cal State Fullerton	3
**Purdue**	**4**
Purdue	1
**Nevada**	**2**

Regional finals
15	**Georgia**	**4**	—
BYU	0	—
2	**UCLA**	**4**	—
Nevada	3	—

Super regionals
15	Georgia	1	0	—
2	**UCLA**	**6**	**6**	—

== Women's College World Series ==
=== Participants ===
School	Conference	Record (conference)	Head coach	WCWS appearances† (including 2008 WCWS)	WCWS best finish†	WCWS W–L record† (excluding 2008 WCWS)
Alabama	SEC	56–5 (25–3)	Patrick Murphy	5 (last: 2006)	5th (2000, 2005)	2–8
Arizona	Pac-10	41–16 (13–8)	Larry Ray (acting coach)	20 (last: 2007)	1st (1991, 1993, 1994, 1996, 1997, 2001, 2006, 2007)	57–25
Arizona State	Pac-10	61–5 (18–3)	Clint Myers	7 (last: 2007)	3rd (1982, 2002)	5–12
Florida	SEC	67–3 (27–1)	Tim Walton	1	—	0–0
Louisiana–Lafayette	Sun Belt	51–12 (19–3)	Michael Lotief; Stefni Lotief	5 (last: 2003)	3rd (1993)	5–8
Texas A&M	Big 12	54–7 (17–1)	Jo Evans	7 (last: 2007)	1st (1983, 1987)	18–10
Virginia Tech	ACC	49–17 (16–5)	Scot Thomas	1	—	0–0
UCLA	Pac-10	48–6 (17–4)	Kelly Inouye-Perez	24 (last: 2006)	1st (1982, 1984, 1985, 1988, 1989, 1990, 1992, 1999, 2003, 2004)	88–27

† Excludes results of the pre-NCAA Women's College World Series of 1969 through 1981.

=== Tournament notes ===
- Florida and Virginia Tech were the first teams in their respective school histories to reach the WCWS in the NCAA era.

=== Results ===
==== Bracket ====
First round
1	Florida	2
**Louisiana–Lafayette**	**3**
5	**Texas A&M**	**1**
Virginia Tech	0
1	**Florida**	**2**
Virginia Tech	0
3	Alabama	1
6	**Arizona State**	**3**
2	**UCLA**	**1**
7	Arizona	0
3	**Alabama**	**5**
7	Arizona	1

Second round
Louisiana–Lafayette	1
5	**Texas A&M**	**2**
1	**Florida**	**2**
2	UCLA	0
6	**Arizona State**	**4**
2	UCLA	0
3	**Alabama**	**3**
Louisiana–Lafayette	1

Semifinals
5	**Texas A&M**	1	**1**
1	Florida	**6**	0
6	**Arizona State**	**3**	—
3	Alabama	1	—

Finals
5	Texas A&M	0	0	—
6	**Arizona State**	**3**	**11**	—

==== Game results ====
Date	Game	Winner	Score	Loser	Notes
May 29, 2008	Game 1	Louisiana–Lafayette	3–2	Florida	In 8th inn., ULL pitcher Ashley Brignac threw 21 straight pitches after reaching a count of 3 balls, 2 strikes before the batter was retired.
May 29, 2008	Game 2	Texas A&M	1–0	Virginia Tech	A throwing error allowed Texas A&M to score an unearned run in the 6th inning.
May 29, 2008	Game 3	Arizona State	3–1	Alabama	ASU erased a 0-1 deficit and scored 3 runs in the 7th inning.
May 29, 2008	Game 4	UCLA	1–0	Arizona	Two errors in the first inning helped UCLA score their only run.
May 30, 2008	Game 5	Texas A&M	2–1	Louisiana–Lafayette	Louisiana–Lafayette tied the game in the bottom of the 6th inning; Texas A&M scored the winning run in the top of the 7th inning.
May 30, 2008	Game 6	Arizona State	4–0	UCLA	Arizona State scored 2 runs in both 3rd and 5th innings; UCLA had 4 hits and Arizona State had 3 hits.
May 31, 2008	Game 7	Florida	2–0	Virginia Tech	VT eliminated in 9 innings; UF scored 2 runs in top of the 9th, VT pitcher Angela Tincher missed tying WCWS record for SO in extra-inning game by 1.
May 31, 2008	Game 8	Alabama	5–1	Arizona	Alabama scored 4 runs in the 6th inning to knock out 2-time defending champion Arizona.
May 31, 2008	Game 9	Florida	2–0	UCLA	Florida scored on a pitching error and an RBI single in the first and sixth inning, respectively, to eliminate UCLA. UCLA's class became the first in school history to not win a WCWS title.
May 31, 2008	Game 10	Alabama	3–1	Louisiana–Lafayette	Louisiana–Lafayette eliminated; Alabama scored the winning runs in the 5th inning.
June 1, 2008	Game 11	Florida	6–1	Texas A&M	Florida used 3 unearned runs in the 4th inning aided by a catcher's error to break a 1–1 tie and a 2-run HR extended the lead in the 7th inning.
June 1, 2008	Game 12	Arizona State	3–1	Alabama	ASU scored on a three-run home run. ASU advances to the National Championship series, and Alabama is eliminated.
June 1, 2008	Game 13	Texas A&M	1–0	Florida	Texas A&M advances to the National Championship series. Macie Morrow scored on Kelsey Spittler's triple in the top of the 9th inning.
June 2, 2008	Finals game 1	Arizona State	3–0	Texas A&M	Arizona State had a run in the 1st, 3rd, and 5th innings. Krista Donnenwirth hit a home run.
June 3, 2008	Finals game 2	Arizona State	11–0	Texas A&M	Arizona State scored 7 runs in the 7th inning to make the game an 11-run game, blanking the Aggies and taking home the national championship trophy.

==== Championship game ====
School	Top Batter	Stats.
Arizona State Sun Devils	Kaitlin Cochran (CF)	1-2 3RBIs HR 2BBs
Texas A&M Aggies	Megan Gibson (P)	1-2 2B BB SB

School	Pitcher	IP	H	R	ER	BB	SO	AB	BF
Arizona State Sun Devils	Katie Burkhart (W)	7.0	4	0	0	1	13	25	26
Texas A&M Aggies	Megan Gibson (L)	7.0	10	11	10	3	5	31	35

==== Final standings ====
Place	School	WCWS record
1st	Arizona State	5–0
2nd	Texas A&M	3–3
3rd	Florida	3–2
3rd	Alabama	2–2
5th	UCLA	1–2
5th	Louisiana–Lafayette	1–2
7th	Arizona	0–2
7th	Virginia Tech	0–2

=== All Tournament Team ===
The following players were members of the All-Tournament Team:

- Francesca Enea, Florida
- Charlotte Morgan, Alabama
- Stacey Nelson, Florida
- Holly Tankersley, La.-Lafayette
- Angela Tincher, Virginia Tech
- Megan Gibson, Texas A&M
- Jami Lobpries, Texas A&M
- Kaitlin Cochran, Arizona State
- Krista Donnenwirth, Arizona State
- Lesley Rogers, Arizona State
- Jackie Vasquez, Arizona State
- Katie Burkhart, Arizona State (Most Outstanding Player)

=== WCWS records tied or broken ===
- 6,240 Session 1 (Games 1 and 2) total attendance — WCWS record
- 8,230 Session 3 (Games 5 and 6) total attendance — WCWS record
- In Game 11, Florida left fielder Francesca Enea hit two home runs to allow her team to defeat Texas A&M 6–1. She tied the WCWS record for the most home runs in a game in the NCAA era that was set by UCLA's Yvonne Gutierrez in 1992 and tied by Arizona's Lindsey Collins in 1999 and UCLA's Andrea Harrison in 2010.
- Arizona State's 11-0 victory over Texas A&M was the largest margin of victory in an NCAA championship clinching game.

=== Post-series notes ===
- At the conclusion of their run in the series, Florida compiled a 70–5 overall record, becoming the first NCAA team to record 70 wins.
- The 2008 WCWS marked the first time that Arizona did not return to the championship game/series while defending one of their eight national championships.

== See also ==
- NCAA Division I Softball Championship
