= Alberta B. Farrington Softball Stadium =

ASU sports venue

- Interactive map of Alberta B. Farrington Softball Stadium
- Former names: Sun Devil Club Stadium (–1999)
- Location: 510 S Athletes Pl, Tempe, Arizona 85281
- Coordinates: 33°25′31.4″N 111°55′24.2″W
- Owner: Arizona State University
- Operator: Arizona State University
- Seating type: chairback bleachers individual seats
- Capacity: 1,535
- Surface: Grass
- Scoreboard: Electronic
- Field size: Left Field: 202 feet Center Field: 210 feet Right Field: 202 feet
- Public transit: Valley Metro Rail

Construction
- Opened: 2000
- Renovated: 2013, 2014
- Architects: Jones Studio, Inc.

Tenant
- Arizona State Sun Devils softball (NCAA) (2000–present)

Alberta B. Farrington Softball Stadium is the home venue for the Arizona State Sun Devils softball team. The stadium holds 1,535 fans and was built around the old stadium's existing field and the new stadium was designed by the architecture firm of Jones Studio, Inc. and was completed in 2000.

Farrington Stadium is considered one of the nation's top collegiate softball fields providing high-end amenities such as chair-back bleachers and individual seats, restrooms, built-in concessions, and stadium shop for fans. A new press box with a seating capacity of 16 was added in 2013. In 2014, solar panels were added to the stadium. The panels were placed above the seating areas providing shade for the spectators.

The Sun Devils have earned 16 postseason bids, fourth all-time in the Pac-10 Conference, and has made four trips to the Women's College World Series. Prior to the current NCAA format, ASU went to seven WCWS, claiming back-to-back national titles in 1972 and 1973. In 2008, the softball team won the universities first Women's College World Series sweeping the Texas A&M Aggies (3-game sweep) in Oklahoma City, Oklahoma.

In February 2019, a new netting system was installed at Farrington Softball Stadium by West Coast Netting Incorporated. The netting system is poleless and uses high tension cables to hold the netting taut.
