= 2008 Florida Gators softball team =

American college softball season

2008 Florida Gators softball

SEC Regular Season Champions SEC Tournament Champions

SEC Tournament Championship Game, W 4–1 vs. Alabama
- Conference: Southeastern Conference
- East
- Record: 70–5 (27–1 SEC)
- Head coach: Tim Walton
- Assistant coach: Jennifer Rocha, Jenny Gladding
- Home stadium: Katie Seashole Pressly Softball Stadium

The 2008 Florida Gators softball team was an American softball team, representing the University of Florida for the 2008 NCAA softball season. The team went 70–5 overall and 27–1 in SEC play. The 70 wins set an NCAA single season record and Florida, named the #1 overall seed in the NCAA tournament, advanced to the semifinals of the Women's College World Series. They also were the SEC regular season and tournament champions. Five Gators were named All-Americans (Stacey Nelson, Kim Waleszonia, Aja Paculba, Francesca Enea, and Ali Gardiner) and Junior pitcher Stacey Nelson was the SEC Pitcher of the Year.

== Previous season ==
The 2007 Florida Gators finished second in the SEC East and made it to the SEC Tournament title game before losing to LSU. They were also invited to host Regionals of the NCAA tournament. After breezing through the Gainesville Regional, the Gators lost the three-game series to Texas A&M 2–1.

== Pre-season ==
The 2008 Gators started the season ranked No. 13 in the NFCA/USA Today poll. They returned All-Americans Stacey Nelson and Kim Waleszonia as well as six other starters from the 2007 team.

== Schedule ==
Date	Time	Opponent	Rank^{#}	Site	Result	Attendance	Winning Pitcher	Losing Pitcher
USF-Wilson Tournament
Feb 8, 2008*	6:00 PM	Bethune–Cookman Wildcats	#13	USF Softball Stadium • Tampa, Florida	W 10-0 (5)	519	Stephanie Brombacher	Taryn Hernandez
Feb 8, 2008*	8:00 PM	Florida Gulf Coast Eagles	#13	USF Softball Stadium • Tampa, Florida	W 6-4	519	Stacey Nelson	Rachael Edinger
Feb 9, 2008*	2:00 PM	@ Illinois Fighting Illini	#13	USF Softball Stadium • Tampa, Florida	W 3-2	Unknown	Stacey Nelson	Ashley Wright
Feb 9, 2008*	6:00 PM	@ Memphis Tigers	#13	USF Softball Complex • Tampa, Florida	W 9-0 (6)	Unknown	Stephanie Brombacher	Lyndsey Sterling
Feb 10, 2008*	2:00 PM	@ South Florida Bulls	#13	USF Softball Complex • Tampa, Florida	W 5-1	766	Stacey Nelson	Courtney Mosch
Feb 13, 2008*	4:00 PM	Mercer Tobies	#11	Katie Seashole Pressly Softball Stadium • Gainesville, Florida	W 5-0	132	Stacey Nelson	Lacey Richardson
Feb 13, 2008*	6:30 PM	Mercer Tobies	#11	Katie Seashole Pressly Softball Stadium • Gainesville, Florida	W 12-1 (5)	132	Stephanie Brombacher	Kristen Adkins
Cox Communications Classic
Feb 15, 2008*	4:00 PM	East Tennessee State Buccaneers	#11	Katie Seashole Pressly Softball Stadium • Gainesville, Florida	W 9-0 (6)	Unknown	Stephanie Brombacher	Darci Gilbert
Feb 15, 2008*	6:15 PM	@ College of Charleston Cougars	#11	Katie Seashole Pressly Softball Stadium • Gainesville, Florida	W 10-0	Unknown	Kelsey Bruder	Terri Mesko
Feb 16, 2008*	1:30 PM	North Carolina Tar Heels	#11	Katie Seashole Pressly Softball Stadium • Gainesville, Florida	W 4-0	964	Stacey Nelson	Amber Johnson
Feb 16, 2008*	4:00 PM	@ East Tennessee State Buccaneers	#11	Katie Seashole Pressly Softball Stadium • Gainesville, Florida	W 10-0 (5)	964	Stephanie Brombacher	Ashley Boyd
Feb 17, 2008*	11:15 AM	North Carolina Tar Heels	#11	Katie Seashole Pressly Softball Stadium • Gainesville, Florida	W 1-0 (9)	742	Stacey Nelson	Lisa Norris
Feb 17, 2008*	1:30 PM	Stetson Hatters	#11	Katie Seashole Pressly Softball Stadium • Gainesville, Florida	W 8-0 (5)	742	Stephanie Brombacher	Amanda Lindsey
Feb 20, 2008*	5:00 PM	Hofstra Pride	#7	Katie Seashole Pressly Softball Stadium • Gainesville, Florida	W 5-0	423	Stacey Nelson	Kayleigh Lotti
Aquafina Invitational
Feb 22, 2008*	3:30 PM	@ Gardner–Webb Runnin' Bulldogs	#7	Katie Seashole Pressly Softball Stadium • Gainesville, Florida	W 15-1	602	Stephanie Brombacher	Christine Murray
Feb 22, 2008*	5:45 PM	North Florida Ospreys	#7	Katie Seashole Pressly Softball Stadium • Gainesville, Florida	W 3-0	602	Stacey Nelson	Devyn Findley
Feb 23, 2008*	1:15 PM	Notre Dame Fighting Irish	#7	Katie Seashole Pressly Softball Stadium • Gainesville, Florida	W 3-2	756	Stacey Nelson	Brittney Bargar
Feb 23, 2008*	3:30 PM	Gardner–Webb Runnin' Bulldogs	#7	Katie Seashole Pressly Softball Stadium • Gainesville, Florida	W 4-3	756	Stacey Nelson	Taryn Beck
Feb 24, 2008*	12:30 PM	Notre Dame Fighting Irish	#7	Katie Seashole Pressly Softball Stadium • Gainesville, Florida	W 5-2	Unknown	Stephanie Brombacher	Brittney Bargar
Feb 27, 2008*	5:00 PM	@ Long Beach State 49ers	#5	CSULB Softball Complex • Long Beach, California	L 1-2 (10)	155	Brooke Turner	Stacey Nelson
Worth Invitational
Feb 29, 2008*	12:00 PM	@ Oregon State Beavers	#5	Anderson Family Field • Fullerton, California	W 8-0	Unknown	Stacey Nelson	Stefanie Draper
Feb 29, 2008*	2:15 PM	@ Pacific Tigers	#5	Anderson Family Field • Fullerton, California	W 10-2	Unknown	Stephanie Brombacher	Alyce Jorgensen
Mar 1, 2008*	6:45 PM	@ Cal State Fullerton Titans	#5	Anderson Family Field • Fullerton, California	W 2-0	804	Stacey Nelson	Christine Hiner
Mar 2, 2008*	12:00 PM	Louisville Cardinals	#5	Anderson Family Field • Fullerton, California	W 4-2	Unknown	Stephanie Brombacher	Kristen Wadwell
Mar 2, 2008*	2:00 PM	#10 Stanford Cardinal	#5	Anderson Family Field • Fullerton, California	W 4-3	Unknown	Stacey Nelson	Missy Penna
Mar 8, 2008	1:00 PM	Ole Miss Rebels	#5	Katie Seashole Pressly Softball Stadium • Gainesville, Florida	W 4-3	786	Stacey Nelson	Lindsey Perry
Mar 8, 2008	3:30 PM	Ole Miss Rebels	#5	Katie Seashole Pressly Softball Stadium • Gainesville, Florida	W 4-3	786	Stephanie Brombacher	Becky Nye
Mar 9, 2008	1:00 PM	Ole Miss Rebels	#5	Katie Seashole Pressly Softball Stadium • Gainesville, Florida	W 5-2	621	Stacey Nelson	Tara Willitt
Mar 12, 2008	6:00 PM	@ #2 Alabama Crimson Tide	#4	Alabama Softball Complex • Tuscaloosa, Alabama	L 0-1	2095	Kelsi Dunne	Stacey Nelson
Mar 12, 2008	8:30 PM	@ #2 Alabama Crimson Tide	#4	Alabama Softball Complex • Tuscaloosa, Alabama	W 8-4	2095	Stacey Nelson	Kelsi Dunne
Mar 14, 2008	4:00 PM	@ Arkansas Razorbacks	#4	Lady Back Yard • Fayetteville, Arkansas	W 1-0	299	Stacey Nelson	Katy Henry
Mar 14, 2008	6:30 PM	@ Arkansas Razorbacks	#4	Lady Back Yard • Fayetteville, Arkansas	W 3-1	299	Stephanie Brombacher	Miranda Dixon
Mar 15, 2008	1:00 PM	@ Arkansas Razorbacks	#4	Lady Back Yard • Fayetteville, Arkansas	W 7-2	Unknown	Stacey Nelson	Katy Henry
Mar 19, 2008*	5:00 PM	Iowa Hawkeyes	#3	Katie Seashole Pressly Softball Stadium • Gainesville, Florida	W 6-1	678	Stephanie Brombacher	Brittany Weil
Mar 22, 2008*	12:00 PM	Longwood Lancers	#3	Katie Seashole Pressly Softball Stadium • Gainesville, Florida	W 9-1 (5)	972	Stacey Nelson	Rachel Mills
Mar 22, 2008*	2:30 PM	Longwood Lancers	#3	Katie Seashole Pressly Softball Stadium • Gainesville, Florida	W 6-0	972	Kristen Adkins	Briana Wells
Mar 23, 2008*	11:00 AM	Longwood Lancers	#3	Katie Seashole Pressly Softball Stadium • Gainesville, Florida	W 11-2 (5)	362	Stacey Nelson	Briana Wells
Mar 26, 2008	3:00 PM	South Carolina Gamecocks	#3	Katie Seashole Pressly Softball Stadium • Gainesville, Florida	W 6-0	637	Stacey Nelson	Kate Pouliot
Mar 26, 2008	5:30 PM	South Carolina Gamecocks	#3	Katie Seashole Pressly Softball Stadium • Gainesville, Florida	W 1-0	637	Stacey Nelson	Melissa Hendon
Mar 29, 2008	1:00 PM	#8 LSU Tigers	#3	Katie Seashole Pressly Softball Stadium • Gainesville, Florida	W 6-1	1845	Stacey Nelson	Dani Hofer
Mar 29, 2008	3:30 PM	#8 LSU Tigers	#3	Katie Seashole Pressly Softball Stadium • Gainesville, Florida	W 2-0	1845	Stephanie Brombacher	Cody Trahan
Mar 30, 2008	1:00 PM	#8 LSU Tigers	#3	Katie Seashole Pressly Softball Stadium • Gainesville, Florida	W 7-0	726	Stacey Nelson	Dani Hofer
Apr 5, 2008	2:00 PM	@ Mississippi State Bulldogs	#3	Mississippi State Softball Field • Starkville, Mississippi	W 5-0	236	Stacey Nelson	Misty Flesher
Apr 5, 2008	4:30 PM	@ Mississippi State Bulldogs	#3	Mississippi State Softball Field • Starkville, Mississippi	W 7-2	236	Stacey Nelson	Kelsey Nurnberg
Apr 6, 2008	2:00 PM	@ Mississippi State Bulldogs	#3	Mississippi State Softball Field • Starkville, Mississippi	W 5-0	225	Stacey Nelson	Kelsey Nurnberg
Apr 12, 2008	1:00 PM	@ #17 Georgia Bulldogs	#3	University of Georgia Softball Complex • Athens, Georgia	W 5-0	1162	Stacey Nelson	Taylor Schlopy
Apr 12, 2008	3:30 PM	@ #17 Georgia Bulldogs	#3	University of Georgia Softball Complex • Athens, Georgia	W 9-5	1162	Stephanie Brombacher	Kate Gaskill
Apr 13, 2008	2:00 PM	@ #17 Georgia Bulldogs	#3	University of Georgia Softball Complex • Athens, Georgia	W 5-2	1215	Stacey Nelson	Taylor Schlopy
Apr 16, 2008*	4:00 PM	@ Florida State Seminoles	#3	JoAnne Graf Field • Tallahassee, Florida	W 6-1	650	Stacey Nelson	Tiffany McDonald
Apr 16, 2008*	6:30 PM	@ Florida State Seminoles	#3	JoAnne Graf Field • Tallahassee, Florida	W 14-4 (5)	650	Stephanie Brombacher	Terese Gober
Apr 19, 2008	1:00 PM	Kentucky Wildcats	#3	Katie Seashole Pressly Softball Stadium • Gainesville, Florida	W 8-0	1166	Stacey Nelson	Jennifer Young
Apr 19, 2008	3:30 PM	Kentucky Wildcats	#3	Katie Seashole Pressly Softball Stadium • Gainesville, Florida	W 6-5	1166	Stephanie Brombacher	Amber Matousek
Apr 20, 2008	1:00 PM	Kentucky Wildcats	#3	Katie Seashole Pressly Softball Stadium • Gainesville, Florida	W 8-0	1097	Stacey Nelson	Amber Matousek
Apr 22, 2008*	5:00 PM	Jacksonville Dolphins	#3	Katie Seashole Pressly Softball Stadium • Gainesville, Florida	W 2-0	472	Stephanie Brombacher	Ashley Iveson
Apr 22, 2008*	7:30 PM	Jacksonville Dolphins	#3	Katie Seashole Pressly Softball Stadium • Gainesville, Florida	W 5-0	472	Kelsey Bruder	Shannon Jensen
Apr 26, 2008	1:00 PM	Auburn Tigers	#3	Katie Seashole Pressly Softball Stadium • Gainesville, Florida	W 3-1	1441	Stacey Nelson	Lauren Schmalz
Apr 26, 2008	3:30 PM	Auburn Tigers	#3	Katie Seashole Pressly Softball Stadium • Gainesville, Florida	W 7-2	1441	Stephanie Brombacher	Brittany Day
Apr 27, 2008	1:00 PM	Auburn Tigers	#3	Katie Seashole Pressly Softball Stadium • Gainesville, Florida	W 10-1 (5)	947	Stacey Nelson	Laren Schmalz
May 3, 2008	4:00 PM	@ #13 Tennessee Volunteers	#3	Lee Softball Stadium • Knoxville, Tennessee	W 4-2	1164	Stacey Nelson	Ashton Ward
May 3, 2008	6:30 PM	@ #13 Tennessee Volunteers	#3	Lee Softball Stadium • Knoxville, Tennessee	W 6-5	1164	Stacey Nelson	Megan Rhodes
May 4, 2008	1:00 PM	@ #13 Tennessee Volunteers	#3	Lee Softball Stadium • Knoxville, Tennessee	W 5-3	1157	Stacey Nelson	Megan Rhodes
SEC Tournament
May 8, 2008	2:30 PM	Ole Miss Rebels	#1	Tiger Park • Baton Rouge, Louisiana	W 1-0	1050	Stephanie Brombacher	Becky Nye
May 9, 2008	6:00 PM	#14 Tennessee Volunteers	#1	Tiger Park • Baton Rouge, Louisiana	W 6-1	Unknown	Stacey Nelson	Megan Rhodes
May 10, 2008	1:30 PM	#3 Alabama Crimson Tide	#1	Tiger Park • Baton Rouge, Louisiana	W 4-1	1281	Stacey Nelson	Kelsi Dunne
NCAA Regionals
May 16, 2008	6:00 PM	Georgia Tech Yellow Jackets	#1	Katie Seashole Pressly Softball Stadium • Gainesville, Florida	W 7-2	1541	Stacey Nelson	Whitney Humphreys
May 17, 2008	1:00 PM	UCF Golden Knights	#1	Katie Seashole Pressly Softball Stadium • Gainesville, Florida	W 3-0	1357	Stacey Nelson	Allison Kime
May 18, 2008	1:00 PM	@ UCF Golden Knights	#1	Katie Seashole Pressly Softball Stadium • Gainesville, Florida	L 0-1	1812	Allison Kime	Stacey Nelson
May 18, 2008	3:30 PM	UCF Golden Knights	#1	Katie Seashole Pressly Softball Stadium • Gainesville, Florida	W 10-0	1812	Stacey Nelson	Allison Kime
NCAA Super Regionals
May 23, 2008	2:00 PM	#24 California Golden Bears	#1	Katie Seashole Pressly Softball Stadium • Gainesville, Florida	W 4-2	1223	Stacey Nelson	Marissa Drewrey
May 24, 2008	12:00 PM	@ #24 California Golden Bears	#1	Katie Seashole Pressly Softball Stadium • Gainesville, Florida	W 4-2 (9)	2082	Stacey Nelson	Marissa Drewrey
Women's College World Series
May 29, 2008	1:00 PM	#16 Louisiana Lafayette Ragin' Cajuns	#1	ASA Hall of Fame Stadium • Oklahoma City, Oklahoma	L 2-3 (8)	5605	Ashley Brignac	Stacey Nelson
May 31, 2008	12:00 PM	@ #17 Virginia Tech Hokies	#1	ASA Hall of Fame Stadium • Oklahoma City, Oklahoma	W 2-0 (9)	7660	Stacey Nelson	Angela Tincher
May 31, 2008	7:00 PM	#5 UCLA Bruins	#1	ASA Hall of Fame Stadium • Oklahoma City, Oklahoma	W 2-0	7660	Stacey Nelson	Anjelica Selden
Jun 1, 2008	1:00 PM	@ #4 Texas A&M Aggies	#1	ASA Hall of Fame Stadium • Oklahoma City, Oklahoma	W 6-1	4928	Stephanie Brombacher	Megan Gibson
Jun 1, 2008	7:00 PM	#4 Texas A&M Aggies	#1	ASA Hall of Fame Stadium • Oklahoma City, Oklahoma	L 0-1 (9)	4928	Stacey Nelson	Megan Gibson
*Non-Conference Game. ^{#}Rankings from NFCA released prior to game.All times are in Eastern Time Zone.

== Game notes ==
=== Bethune–Cookman ===
	1	2	3	4	5	6	7	R	H	E
Wildcats	0	0	0	0	0	-	-	0	1	0
Gators	1	5	3	1	X	-	-	10	9	0

=== Florida Gulf Coast ===
	1	2	3	4	5	6	7	R	H	E
Eagles	0	0	0	4	0	0	0	4	5	0
Gators	3	0	1	1	0	1	X	6	10	1

=== Illinois ===
	1	2	3	4	5	6	7	R	H	E
Gators	0	2	0	1	0	0	0	3	6	0
Fighting Illini	0	0	0	2	0	0	0	2	4	0

=== Memphis ===
	1	2	3	4	5	6	7	R	H	E
Gators	0	4	0	2	3	-	-	9	4	0
Tigers	0	0	0	0	0	-	-	0	3	6

=== South Florida ===
	1	2	3	4	5	6	7	R	H	E
Gators	0	0	0	4	1	0	0	5	4	1
Bulls	1	0	0	0	0	0	0	1	2	1

=== Mercer (Game 1) ===
	1	2	3	4	5	6	7	R	H	E
Tobies	0	0	0	0	0	0	0	0	1	0
Gators	1	0	2	0	2	0	X	5	6	0

=== Mercer (Game 2) ===
	1	2	3	4	5	6	7	R	H	E
Tobies	0	0	0	1	0	-	-	1	5	0
Gators	2	0	0	10	X	-	-	12	11	1

=== East Tennessee State (Game 1) ===
	1	2	3	4	5	6	7	R	H	E
Buccaneers	0	0	0	0	0	0	-	0	1	2
Gators	0	4	2	0	0	3	-	9	6	0

=== College of Charleston ===
	1	2	3	4	5	6	7	R	H	E
Gators	4	1	0	1	0	1	3	10	15	1
Cougars	0	0	0	0	0	0	0	0	4	0

=== North Carolina (Game 1) ===
	1	2	3	4	5	6	7	R	H	E
Tar Heels	0	0	0	0	0	0	0	0	3	0
Gators	4	0	0	0	0	0	X	4	7	1

=== East Tennessee State (Game 2) ===
	1	2	3	4	5	6	7	R	H	E
Gators	4	4	0	1	1	-	-	10	9	2
Buccaneers	1	0	0	0	0	-	-	1	2	3

=== North Carolina (Game 2) ===
	1	2	3	4	5	6	7	8	9	R	H	E
Gators	0	0	0	0	0	0	0	0	1	1	4	0
Tar Heels	0	0	0	0	0	0	0	0	0	0	5	0

=== Stetson ===
	1	2	3	4	5	6	7	R	H	E
Hatters	0	0	0	0	0	-	-	0	2	1
Gators	1	0	5	0	2	-	-	8	10	3

=== Hofstra ===
	1	2	3	4	5	6	7	R	H	E
Pride	0	0	0	0	0	0	0	0	4	3
Gators	0	0	0	4	1	X	-	5	6	1

=== Gardner–Webb (Game 1) ===
	1	2	3	4	5	6	7	R	H	E
Gators	3	5	1	0	6	-	-	15	14	0
Runnin' Bulldogs	0	0	0	0	0	-	-	1	4	0

=== North Florida ===
	1	2	3	4	5	6	7	R	H	E
Ospreys	0	0	0	0	0	0	0	0	1	1
Gators	0	0	0	2	0	1	X	3	7	0

=== Notre Dame (Game 1) ===
	1	2	3	4	5	6	7	R	H	E
Fighting Irish	1	0	1	0	0	0	0	2	2	1
Gators	0	0	0	0	0	3	X	3	5	2

=== Gardner–Webb (Game 2) ===
	1	2	3	4	5	6	7	R	H	E
Runnin' Bulldogs	0	0	0	1	2	0	0	3	7	0
Gators	0	0	3	0	0	0	1	4	9	1

=== Notre Dame (Game 2) ===
	1	2	3	4	5	6	7	R	H	E
Fighting Irish	0	0	0	0	0	2	0	2	3	3
Gators	2	0	0	0	3	0	X	5	7	3

=== Long Beach State ===
	1	2	3	4	5	6	7	8	9	10	R	H	E
Gators	0	0	0	0	1	0	0	0	0	0	1	5	1
49ers	0	0	0	0	0	1	0	0	0	1	2	5	0

=== Oregon State ===
	1	2	3	4	5	6	7	R	H	E
Gators	6	0	1	0	0	1	-	8	10	1
Beavers	0	0	0	0	0	0	-	0	1	0

=== Pacific ===
	1	2	3	4	5	6	7	R	H	E
Gators	1	2	0	1	2	2	2	10	16	0
Tigers	0	1	0	1	0	0	0	2	7	2

=== Cal State Fullerton ===
	1	2	3	4	5	6	7	R	H	E
Gators	1	0	0	0	0	0	1	2	6	0
Titans	0	0	0	0	0	0	0	0	2	2

=== Louisville ===
	1	2	3	4	5	6	7	R	H	E
Cardinals	0	0	1	0	0	1	0	2	6	1
Gators	2	0	1	1	0	0	X	4	9	0

=== Stanford ===
	1	2	3	4	5	6	7	R	H	E
Cardinals	0	0	0	0	0	3	0	3	5	0
Gators	1	0	0	0	0	0	3	4	5	0

=== Ole Miss (Game 1) ===
	1	2	3	4	5	6	7	R	H	E
Rebels	0	0	0	3	0	0	0	3	2	2
Gators	0	2	0	1	0	0	1	4	8	2

=== Ole Miss (Game 2) ===
	1	2	3	4	5	6	7	R	H	E
Rebels	0	0	0	1	2	0	0	3	7	0
Gators	0	0	3	0	0	0	1	4	9	1

=== Ole Miss (Game 3) ===
	1	2	3	4	5	6	7	R	H	E
Rebels	0	0	0	1	0	1	0	2	8	2
Gators	0	2	0	2	1	0	X	5	9	0

=== Alabama (Game 1) ===
	1	2	3	4	5	6	7	R	H	E
Gators	0	0	0	0	0	0	0	0	3	0
Crimson Tide	0	0	1	0	0	0	X	1	2	0

=== Alabama (Game 2) ===
	1	2	3	4	5	6	7	R	H	E
Gators	0	1	2	1	0	0	4	8	10	0
Crimson Tide	0	1	0	0	1	2	0	4	6	1

=== Arkansas (Game 1) ===
	1	2	3	4	5	6	7	R	H	E
Gators	0	0	0	0	0	0	1	1	8	0
Razorbacks	0	0	0	0	0	0	0	0	4	2

=== Arkansas (Game 2) ===
	1	2	3	4	5	6	7	R	H	E
Gators	2	0	0	0	1	0	0	3	5	0
Razorbacks	1	0	0	0	0	0	0	1	4	3

=== Arkansas (Game 3) ===
	1	2	3	4	5	6	7	R	H	E
Gators	0	0	0	3	3	0	1	7	12	0
Razorbacks	1	0	0	0	1	0	0	2	5	0

=== Iowa ===
	1	2	3	4	5	6	7	R	H	E
Hawkeyes	0	0	0	0	1	0	0	1	8	2
Gators	0	5	0	1	0	0	X	6	6	0

=== Longwood (Game 1) ===
	1	2	3	4	5	6	7	R	H	E
Lancers	0	1	0	0	0	-	-	1	3	0
Gators	4	1	4	0	X	-	-	9	9	0

=== Longwood (Game 2) ===
	1	2	3	4	5	6	7	R	H	E
Lancers	0	0	0	0	0	0	0	0	6	0
Gators	0	1	0	0	0	5	X	6	8	0

=== Longwood (Game 3) ===
	1	2	3	4	5	6	7	R	H	E
Lancers	0	0	0	0	2	-	-	2	4	1
Gators	2	0	2	7	X	-	-	11	12	3

=== South Carolina (Game 1) ===
	1	2	3	4	5	6	7	R	H	E
Gamecocks	0	0	0	0	0	0	0	0	4	4
Gators	0	3	0	0	2	1	X	6	10	0

=== South Carolina (Game 2) ===
	1	2	3	4	5	6	7	R	H	E
Gamecocks	0	0	0	0	0	0	0	0	2	0
Gators	0	0	0	0	0	0	1	1	2	0

=== LSU (Game 1) ===
	1	2	3	4	5	6	7	R	H	E
Tigers	1	0	0	0	0	0	0	1	3	2
Gators	0	0	2	0	0	4	X	6	9	2

=== LSU (Game 2) ===
	1	2	3	4	5	6	7	R	H	E
Tigers	0	0	0	0	0	0	0	0	5	1
Gators	0	2	0	0	0	0	X	2	5	0

=== LSU (Game 3) ===
	1	2	3	4	5	6	7	R	H	E
Wildcats	0	0	0	0	0	0	0	0	3	1
Gators	3	0	2	0	2	0	X	7	10	2

=== Mississippi State (Game 1) ===
	1	2	3	4	5	6	7	R	H	E
Gators	1	0	2	0	0	0	2	5	7	0
Bulldogs	0	0	0	0	0	0	0	0	5	0

=== Mississippi State (Game 2) ===
	1	2	3	4	5	6	7	R	H	E
Gators	0	0	0	1	0	2	4	7	12	2
Bulldogs	0	2	0	0	0	0	0	2	7	0

=== Mississippi State (Game 3) ===
	1	2	3	4	5	6	7	R	H	E
Gators	1	1	1	2	0	0	0	5	9	1
Bulldogs	0	0	0	0	0	0	0	0	4	1

=== Georgia (Game 1) ===
	1	2	3	4	5	6	7	R	H	E
Gators	2	1	0	0	0	0	2	5	10	1
Bulldogs	0	0	0	0	0	0	0	0	4	1

=== Georgia (Game 2) ===
	1	2	3	4	5	6	7	R	H	E
Gators	0	0	2	2	3	0	2	9	11	4
Bulldogs	0	2	0	0	3	0	0	5	8	1

=== Georgia (Game 3) ===
	1	2	3	4	5	6	7	R	H	E
Gators	2	0	2	1	0	0	0	5	7	1
Bulldogs	0	0	0	1	1	0	0	2	8	4

=== Florida State (Game 1) ===
	1	2	3	4	5	6	7	R	H	E
Gators	3	1	1	0	1	0	0	6	0
Seminoles	0	1	0	0	0	0	0	1	4	4

=== Florida State (Game 2) ===
	1	2	3	4	5	6	7	R	H	E
Gators	0	3	4	3	4	-	-	14	13	1
Seminoles	1	0	3	0	0	-	-	4	8	1

=== Kentucky (Game 1) ===
	1	2	3	4	5	6	7	R	H	E
Wildcats	0	0	0	0	0	-	-	0	1	1
Gators	6	0	0	0	2	-	-	8	9	0

=== Kentucky (Game 2) ===
	1	2	3	4	5	6	7	R	H	E
Wildcats	0	0	0	1	0	4	0	5	7	2
Gators	0	3	1	2	0	0	X	6	12	0

=== Kentucky (Game 3) ===
	1	2	3	4	5	6	7	R	H	E
Wildcats	0	0	0	0	0	-	-	0	1	4
Gators	0	0	3	0	5	-	-	8	10	0

=== Jacksonville (Game 1) ===
	1	2	3	4	5	6	7	R	H	E
Dolphins	0	0	0	0	0	0	0	0	4	1
Gators	0	0	0	2	0	0	X	2	5	0

=== Jacksonville (Game 2) ===
	1	2	3	4	5	6	7	R	H	E
Wildcats	0	0	0	0	0	0	0	0	2	3
Gators	2	0	1	0	0	2	X	5	6	1

=== Auburn (Game 1) ===
	1	2	3	4	5	6	7	R	H	E
Tigers	0	0	0	1	0	0	0	1	3	0
Gators	2	0	0	0	1	0	X	3	8	1

=== Auburn (Game 2) ===
	1	2	3	4	5	6	7	R	H	E
Tigers	0	1	0	0	0	0	1	2	3	1
Gators	0	7	0	0	0	0	X	7	10	4

=== Auburn (Game 3) ===
	1	2	3	4	5	6	7	R	H	E
Tigers	1	0	0	0	0	-	-	0	2	1
Gators	5	2	3	1	X	-	-	10	11	1

=== Tennessee (Game 1) ===
	1	2	3	4	5	6	7	R	H	E
Gators	3	0	0	0	0	0	1	4	9	2
Volunteers	0	0	0	0	2	0	0	2	5	0

=== Tennessee (Game 2) ===
	1	2	3	4	5	6	7	8	9	10	11	R	H	E
Gators	0	1	0	0	3	0	0	0	0	1	1	6	7	2
Volunteers	1	0	0	0	0	3	0	0	0	1	0	5	12	0

=== Tennessee (Game 3) ===
	1	2	3	4	5	6	7	R	H	E
Gators	0	0	3	0	1	0	1	5	8	1
Volunteers	2	0	0	1	0	0	0	3	8	1

=== Ole Miss (SEC Tournament) ===
	1	2	3	4	5	6	7	R	H	E
Rebels	0	0	0	0	0	0	0	0	1	0
Gators	0	0	0	0	0	1	X	1	6	0

=== Tennessee (SEC Tournament ===
	1	2	3	4	5	6	7	R	H	E
Volunteers	1	0	0	0	0	0	0	1	4	0
Gators	0	3	0	0	1	2	X	6	8	1

=== Alabama (SEC Tournament) ===
	1	2	3	4	5	6	7	R	H	E
Crimson Tide	0	0	0	0	0	1	0	1	3	1
Gators	0	0	0	0	0	4	X	4	5	1

=== Georgia Tech (NCAA Gainesville Regional – Game 2) ===
	1	2	3	4	5	6	7	R	H	E
Yellow Jackets	0	0	0	1	1	0	0	2	5	0
Gators	4	0	0	2	0	1	X	7	9	1

=== UCF (NCAA Gainesville Regional – Game 3) ===
	1	2	3	4	5	6	7	R	H	E
Gators	0	0	1	0	0	2	0	3	4	1
Golden Knights	0	0	0	0	0	0	0	0	4	0

=== UCF (NCAA Gainesville Regional – Game 6) ===
	1	2	3	4	5	6	7	8	R	H	E
Gators	0	0	0	0	0	0	0	0	0	5	2
Golden Knights	0	0	0	0	0	0	0	1	1	5	0

=== UCF (NCAA Gainesville Regional – Game 7) ===
	1	2	3	4	5	6	7	R	H	E
Golden Knights	0	0	0	0	0	-	-	0	1	3
Gators	3	1	0	6	X	-	-	10	9	0

=== California (NCAA Gainesville Super Regional – Game 1) ===
	1	2	3	4	5	6	7	R	H	E
Golden Bears	0	0	0	0	1	1	0	2	9	3
Gators	0	0	1	3	0	0	X	4	6	1

=== California (NCAA Gainesville Super Regional – Game 2) ===
	1	2	3	4	5	6	7	8	9	R	H	E
Gators	0	0	1	0	1	0	0	0	2	4	10	1
Golden Bears	0	0	0	0	0	2	0	0	0	2	3	2

=== Louisiana-Lafayette (WCWS – Game 1) ===
	1	2	3	4	5	6	7	8	R	H	E
Ragin' Cajuns	0	0	0	0	2	0	0	1	3	9	0
Gators	0	1	0	1	0	0	0	0	2	6	1

=== Virginia Tech (WCWS – Game 7) ===
	1	2	3	4	5	6	7	8	9	R	H	E
Gators	0	0	0	0	0	0	0	0	2	2	8	1
Hokies	0	0	0	0	0	0	0	0	0	0	2	0

=== UCLA (WCWS – Game 9) ===
	1	2	3	4	5	6	7	R	H	E
Bruins	0	0	0	0	0	0	0	0	5	1
Gators	1	0	0	0	0	1	X	2	3	1

=== Texas A&M (WCWS – Game 11) ===
	1	2	3	4	5	6	7	R	H	E
Gators	0	1	0	3	0	0	2	6	9	1
Aggies	0	1	0	0	0	0	0	1	3	1

=== Texas A&M (WCWS – Game 13) ===
	1	2	3	4	5	6	7	8	9	R	H	E
Aggies	0	0	0	0	0	0	0	0	1	1	6	0
Gators	0	0	0	0	0	0	0	0	0	0	7	0

== Ranking Movement ==
Poll	Last	Pre	Wk 1	Wk 2	Wk 3	Wk 4	Wk 5	Wk 6	Wk 7	Wk 8	Wk 9	Wk 10	Wk 11	Wk 12	Wk 13	Wk 14	Final
NFCA	14	13	11	7	5	5	4	3	3	3	3	3	3	3	1	1	3
United States Softball	15	13	10	9	7	5	4	4	4	3	4	3	2	2	1	1	3

== Roster ==
The 2008 Florida Gators softball team had 1 senior, 8 juniors, 3 sophomores, and 8 freshmen.

#	Name	Position	Height	B/T	Year	Hometown
2	Kelsey Bruder	UT	5-5	L/R	Fr	Corona, California
3	Aja Paculba	2B	5-3	R/R	Fr	Wildomar, California
4	Danyell Hines	OF	5-6	L/R	Jr	Bryan, Texas
5	Kim Waleszonia	UT	5-4	L/R	Jr	Fontana, California
8	Kristine Priebe	1B/C	5-10	R/R	Fr	Moorpark, California
10	Francesca Enea	C	5-8	R/R	So	Woodland Hills, California
12	Megan Bush	SS	5-5	R/R	Fr	Anaheim Hills, California
13	Shaunice Harris	3B	5-5	R/R	Fr	Moreno Valley, California
15	Brooke Johnson	OF	5-8	R/R	Jr	Lakeland, Florida
20	Le-Net Franklin	UT	5-7	L/R	Jr	Belton, Texas
21	Kristen Adkins	UT	5-8	R/R	Fr	McKinney, Texas
23	Mary Ratliff	OF	5-8	L/R	Sr	Mt. Sterling, Kentucky
24	Ali Gardiner	1B	5-7	L/L	Jr	Waccabuc, New York
26	Ami Austin	UT	5-3	L/L	So	Ormond Beach, Florida
27	Corrie Brooks	OF	5-9	R/R	So	Christmas, Florida
28	Tiffany DeFelice	C	5-5	R/R	Fr	Coral Springs, Florida
31	Kristina Hilberth	UT	5-6	L/R	Jr	Dunedin, Florida
32	Stephanie Brombacher	RHP/1B	5-10	R/R	Fr	Pembroke Pines, Florida
33	Brittany Handy	OF	5-10	R/R	Jr	Gainesville, Florida
42	Stacey Nelson	RHP	5-10	R/R	Jr	Los Alamitos, California

== Coaching staff ==
Head coach: Tim Walton (3rd season)
Assistant Coaches: Jennifer Rocha (3rd season), Jenny Gladding (2nd season)
Athletic Trainer: Scott Schenker
Student Trainer: Arielle Gavdosh
Strength & Conditioning Coordinator: Steven Orris
Academic Counselor: Tony Meacham
Staff Assistant: Brittany Souilliard
Managers: Crystal Sleeman and Kip Collins

== See also ==
- Florida Gators softball
