= List of Fresno State Bulldogs softball seasons =

This is a list of Fresno State Bulldogs softball seasons. The Fresno State Bulldogs softball program is a college softball team that represents the California State University, Fresno in the Mountain West Conference of the National Collegiate Athletic Association.

The Bulldogs have won 24 conference regular season championships, four conference tournaments, and appeared in the NCAA Division I softball tournament 34 times, advancing to the Women's College World Series twelve times and winning the 1998 National Championship.

== Season results ==
National champions	Women's College World Series berth	NCAA Tournament berth	Conference Tournament Champions	Conference champions

Season	Head coach	Conference	Season results									Tournament results	
Season	Head coach	Conference	Overall				Conference					Conference	Postseason
Season	Head coach	Conference	Wins	Losses	Ties	%	Wins	Losses	Ties	%	Finish	Conference	Postseason
Fresno State Bulldogs
1978	Donna Pickel	NCAC	12	5	0	.706	10	2	0	.833	1st	—	—
1979	Donna Pickel	NCAC	18	14	0	.563	13	3	0	.813	2nd	—	—
1980	Donna Pickel	NCAC	26	15	0	.634	11	5	0	.688	2nd	—	—
1981	Donna Pickel	NCAC	28	23	0	.549	11	5	0	.688	2nd	—	—
1982	Donna Pickel	NCAC	43	11	0	.796	17	3	0	.850	1st	—	WCWS Runner-up
1983	Donna Pickel	NorPac	37	14	0	.725	12	0	0	1.000	1st	—	NCAA Tournament
1984	Donna Pickel	NorPac	49	23	0	.681	9	3	0	.750	2nd	—	Women's College World Series
1985	Donna Pickel	NorPac	53	15	0	.779	9	1	0	.900	1st	NorPac Tournament	NCAA Tournament
1986	Margie Wright	NorPac	40	16	1	.711	8	2	0	.800	1st	NorPac Tournament	NCAA Tournament
1987	Margie Wright	Big West	54	16	0	.771	31	5	0	.861	T-1st	—	Women's College World Series
1988	Margie Wright	Big West	55	17	0	.764	29	5	0	.853	T-1st	—	WCWS Runner-up
1989	Margie Wright	Big West	58	14	0	.806	29	7	0	.806	1st	—	WCWS Runner-up
1990	Margie Wright	Big West	62	15	0	.805	29	7	0	.806	1st	—	WCWS Runner-up
1991	Margie Wright	Big West	57	11	0	.838	31	5	0	.861	1st	—	Women's College World Series
1992	Margie Wright	Big West	52	16	0	.765	26	10	0	.722	1st	—	Women's College World Series
1993	Margie Wright	WAC	38	24	0	.613	14	10	0	.583	3rd	—	NCAA Tournament
1994	Margie Wright	WAC	49	16	0	.754	21	5	0	.808	3rd	—	Women's College World Series
1995	Margie Wright	WAC	50	19	0	.725	18	8	0	.692		—	NCAA Tournament
1996	Margie Wright	WAC	51	11	0	.823	24	2	0	.923	1st	—	NCAA Tournament
1997	Margie Wright	WAC	55	14	0	.797	23	9	0	.719	2nd	—	Women's College World Series
1998	Margie Wright	WAC	52	11	0	.825	28	2	0	.933	1st	—	National Champions
1999	Margie Wright	WAC	65	10	0	.867	24	0	0	1.000	1st	Champions	Women's College World Series
2000	Margie Wright	WAC	54	14	0	.794	16	2	0	.889	1st	—	NCAA Tournament
2001	Margie Wright	WAC	39	19	0	.672	13	3	0	.813	1st	—	NCAA Tournament
2002	Margie Wright	WAC	50	20	0	.714	18	6	0	.750	1st	—	NCAA Tournament
2003	Margie Wright	WAC	36	22	0	.621	14	4	0	.778	2nd	—	NCAA Tournament
2004	Margie Wright	WAC	48	20	0	.706	20	4	0	.833	1st	—	NCAA Tournament
2005	Margie Wright	WAC	43	12	0	.782	17	1	0	.944	1st	—	NCAA Tournament
2006	Margie Wright	WAC	37	19	0	.661	12	3	0	.800	1st	—	NCAA Tournament
2007	Margie Wright	WAC	47	18	0	.723	15	3	0	.833	2nd	Champions	NCAA Tournament
2008	Margie Wright	WAC	54	13	0	.806	14	3	0	.824	2nd		NCAA Tournament
2009	Margie Wright	WAC	38	20	0	.655	15	5	0	.750	1st	Champions	NCAA Tournament
2010	Margie Wright	WAC	41	21	0	.661	15	6	0	.714	2nd		NCAA Tournament
2011	Margie Wright	WAC	35	19	0	.648	15	6	0	.714	T-2nd		NCAA Tournament
2012	Margie Wright	WAC	36	23	0	.610	13	6	0	.684	3rd	—	NCAA Tournament
2013	Trisha Ford	MWC	30	24	0	.556	11	7	0	.611	2nd	—	—
2014	Trisha Ford	MWC	31	21	0	.596	15	9	0	.625	2nd	—	—
2015	Trisha Ford	MWC	40	16	0	.714	20	4	0	.833	1st	—	NCAA Tournament
2016	Trisha Ford	MWC	43	10	2	.800	22	1	0	.957	1st	—	NCAA Tournament
2017	Linda Garza	MWC	35	23	0	.603	14	9	0	.609	T-3rd	—	NCAA Tournament
2018	Linda Garza	MWC	31	23	0	.574	14	10	0	.583	3rd	—	—
2019	Linda Garza	MWC	37	20	0	.649	14	10	0	.583	4th	—	—
2020	Linda Garza	MWC	21	4	0	.840	Season cancelled due to COVID-19 pandemic						
2021	Linda Garza	MWC	37	12	0	.755	20	4	0	.833	1st	Champions	NCAA Tournament
2022	Stacy May-Johnson	MWC	19	36	0	.345	10	14	0	.417	5th	—	—
2023	Stacy May-Johnson	MWC	23	31	0	.426	10	12	0	.455	T–5th	—	—
2024	Stacy May-Johnson	MWC	33	19	0	.635	13	9	0	.591	T–4th	—	—
2025	Stacy May-Johnson	MWC	37	20	0	.649	15	7	0	.682	3rd	—	—
2026	Charlotte Morgan	MWC	23	24	0	.489	12	13	0	.480	5th	—	—
