= 1999 Arizona Wildcats softball team =

American college softball season

1999 Arizona Wildcats softball

NCAA Regional champion

Women's College World Series, T-5th
- Conference: Pacific-10 Conference
- Record: 53–16 (19–9 Pac-10)
- Head coach: Mike Candrea (14th season)
- Home stadium: Rita Hillenbrand Memorial Stadium

1999 Pacific-10 Conference softball standings
	Conf.				Overall
Team	W		L	PCT	W		L	PCT
No. 1 UCLA ‍†‍‍^{y}	22	–	6	.786	63	–	6	.913
No. 6 Arizona ‍‍‍^{y}	19	–	9	.679	53	–	16	.768
No. 2 Washington ‍‍‍^{y}	15	–	12	.556	51	–	18	.739
No. 10 Oregon State ‍‍‍^{y}	14	–	14	.500	47	–	25	.653
No. 4 California ‍‍‍^{y}	13	–	14	.481	51	–	22	.699
No. 25 Oregon ‍‍‍^{y}	10	–	18	.357	40	–	29	.580
Stanford ‍‍‍^{y}	10	–	18	.357	40	–	25	.615
No. 7 Arizona State ‍‍‍^{y}	8	–	20	.286	41	–	28	.594
† – Conference champion y – Invited to the NCAA tournament As of June 30, 1999; Rankings from NFCA/USA Today

The 1999 Arizona Wildcats softball team represented the University of Arizona in the 1999 NCAA Division I softball season. The Wildcats were coached by Mike Candrea, who led his fourteenth season. The Wildcats finished with a record of 53–16. They competed in the Pacific-10 Conference, where they finished second with a 19–9 record.

The Wildcats were invited to the 1999 NCAA Division I softball tournament, where they won the Regional and advanced to their twelfth Women's College World Series. Arizona finished tied for fifth place with a win over eventual semifinalist California and losses to runner-up Washington and semifinalist DePaul.

== Personnel ==
=== Roster ===
1999 Arizona Wildcats roster
Pitchers: 0 - Becky Lemke - Sophomore; 2 - Teresa Ayoub - Sophomore; 27 - Jennie Finch - Freshman; 62 - Meghann Pricer - Sophomore; Catchers: 33 - Amy Baray - Junior; 42 - Lindsey Collins - Sophomore	Infielders: 5 - Katie Swan - Junior; 21 - Michelle Churnock - Senior; 32 - Toni Mascarenas - Sophomore; 35 - Felecity Willis - Sophomore	Outfielders: 3 - Lindsay Robinson - Junior; 4 - Nicole Giordano - Sophomore; 7 - Erika Hanson - Sophomore; 20 - Tami Acuna - Junior; 24 - Lauren Bauer - Sophomore; 99 - Chrissy Gil - Junior

=== Coaches ===
1999 Arizona Wildcats softball coaching staff
- Mike Candrea - Head coach - 14th season
- Stacy Hill - Assistant coach - 5th season
- Amy Chellevold - Assistant coach - 4th season

== Schedule ==
Legend
	Arizona win
	Arizona loss
*	Non-Conference game

1999 Arizona Wildcats softball game log
Regular season

February
Date	Opponent	Rank	Site/stadium	Score	Overall record	Pac-10 record
Feb 5	No. 24 UIC*	No. 2	Rita Hillenbrand Memorial Stadium • Tucson, AZ (Arizona Classic)	W 5–0	1–0	
Feb 5	No. 24 UIC*	No. 2	Rita Hillenbrand Memorial Stadium • Tucson, AZ (Arizona Classic)	W 14–1 ^{(5)}	2–0	
Feb 6	New Mexico State*	No. 2	Rita Hillenbrand Memorial Stadium • Tucson, AZ (Arizona Classic)	W 11–1 ^{(5)}	3–0	
Feb 6	New Mexico State*	No. 2	Rita Hillenbrand Memorial Stadium • Tucson, AZ (Arizona Classic)	W 8–0 ^{(5)}	4–0	
Feb 7	No. 2 Washington*	No. 2	Rita Hillenbrand Memorial Stadium • Tucson, AZ (Arizona Classic)	W 3–2	5–0	
Feb 12	vs South Carolina*	No. 2	Sun Devil Club Stadium • Tempe, AZ (Kajikawa Classic)	W 7–5 ^{(5)}	6–0	
Feb 13	No. 10 vs UMass*	No. 2	Sun Devil Club Stadium • Tempe, AZ (Kajikawa Classic)	W 2–1	7–0	
Feb 13	vs Maryland*	No. 2	Sun Devil Club Stadium • Tempe, AZ (Kajikawa Classic)	W 1–0 ^{(5)}	8–0	
Feb 14	vs No. 13 Long Beach State*	No. 2	Sun Devil Club Stadium • Tempe, AZ (Kajikawa Classic)	W 4–1	9–0	
Feb 19	vs UTSA*	No. 2	Red and Charline McCombs Field • Austin, TX (Texas Softball Tournament)	W 7–0	10–0	
Feb 19	at No. 7 Texas*	No. 2	Red and Charline McCombs Field • Austin, TX (Texas Softball Tournament)	L 0–1	10–1	
Feb 20	vs No. 19 Alabama*	No. 2	Red and Charline McCombs Field • Austin, TX (Texas Softball Tournament)	W 8–0 ^{(5)}	11–1	
Feb 20	vs UTSA*	No. 2	Red and Charline McCombs Field • Austin, TX (Texas Softball Tournament)	W 4–2	12–1	
Feb 21	at No. 7 Texas*	No. 2	Red and Charline McCombs Field • Austin, TX (Texas Softball Tournament)	W 5–0	13–1	
Feb 26	Tennessee*	No. 2	Rita Hillenbrand Memorial Stadium • Tucson, AZ (Wildcat Invitational)	W 6–5	14–1	
Feb 26	No. 6 South Florida*	No. 2	Rita Hillenbrand Memorial Stadium • Tucson, AZ (Wildcat Invitational)	W 7–4	15–1	
Feb 27	No. 17 Hawaii*	No. 2	Rita Hillenbrand Memorial Stadium • Tucson, AZ (Wildcat Invitational)	W 5–0	16–1	
Feb 27	No. 17 Hawaii*	No. 2	Rita Hillenbrand Memorial Stadium • Tucson, AZ (Wildcat Invitational)	W 8–0 ^{(5)}	17–1	
Feb 28	Tennessee*	No. 2	Rita Hillenbrand Memorial Stadium • Tucson, AZ (Wildcat Invitational)	W 3–1	18–1	

March
Date	Opponent	Rank	Site/stadium	Score	Overall record	Pac-10 record
Mar 5	No. 12 LSU*	No. 2	Rita Hillenbrand Memorial Stadium • Tucson, AZ (Hillenbrand Invitational)	W 9–1 ^{(5)}	19–1	
Mar 5	Kansas*	No. 2	Rita Hillenbrand Memorial Stadium • Tucson, AZ (Hillenbrand Invitational)	W 9–0 ^{(5)}	20–1	
Mar 6	Notre Dame*	No. 2	Rita Hillenbrand Memorial Stadium • Tucson, AZ (Hillenbrand Invitational)	W 16–0 ^{(5)}	21–1	
Mar 6	Texas Tech*	No. 2	Rita Hillenbrand Memorial Stadium • Tucson, AZ (Hillenbrand Invitational)	W 4–0	22–1	
Mar 7	Notre Dame*	No. 2	Rita Hillenbrand Memorial Stadium • Tucson, AZ (Hillenbrand Invitational)	W 16–0 ^{(5)}	23–1	
Mar 7	No. 12 LSU*	No. 2	Rita Hillenbrand Memorial Stadium • Tucson, AZ (Hillenbrand Invitational)	W 9–1 ^{(5)}	24–1	
Mar 18	vs Cal State Northridge*	No. 2	Anderson Family Field • Fullerton, CA (Judi Garman Classic)	W 3–1	25–1	
Mar 18	vs No. 18 DePaul*	No. 2	Anderson Family Field • Fullerton, CA (Judi Garman Classic)	L 0–2	25–2	
Mar 19	vs San Diego State*	No. 2	Anderson Family Field • Fullerton, CA (Judi Garman Classic)	W 10–5	26–2	
Mar 19	vs No. 12 Oregon State*	No. 2	Anderson Family Field • Fullerton, CA (Judi Garman Classic)	L 2–3	26–3	
Mar 20	vs Florida*	No. 2	Anderson Family Field • Fullerton, CA (Judi Garman Classic)	W 6–0	27–3	
Mar 26	No. 16 Oregon	No. 2	Rita Hillenbrand Memorial Stadium • Tucson, AZ	W 9–1 ^{(5)}	28–3	1–0
Mar 26	No. 16 Oregon	No. 2	Rita Hillenbrand Memorial Stadium • Tucson, AZ	W 11–6	29–3	2–0
Mar 27	No. 12 Oregon State	No. 2	Rita Hillenbrand Memorial Stadium • Tucson, AZ	L 0–4	29–4	2–1
Mar 27	No. 12 Oregon State	No. 2	Rita Hillenbrand Memorial Stadium • Tucson, AZ	W 3–2	30–4	3–1

April
Date	Opponent	Rank	Site/stadium	Score	Overall record	Pac-10 record
Apr 3	at No. 6 Arizona State	No. 2	Sun Devil Club Stadium • Tempe, AZ	W 3–2	31–4	4–1
Apr 3	at No. 6 Arizona State	No. 2	Sun Devil Club Stadium • Tempe, AZ	W 2–1	32–4	5–1
Apr 7	Cal State Northridge*	No. 2	Rita Hillenbrand Memorial Stadium • Tucson, AZ	W 10–1 ^{(5)}	33–4	
Apr 7	Cal State Northridge*	No. 2	Rita Hillenbrand Memorial Stadium • Tucson, AZ	L 3–5	33–5	
Apr 10	at No. 1 UCLA	No. 2	Easton Stadium • Los Angeles, CA	L 2–6	33–6	5–2
Apr 10	at No. 1 UCLA	No. 2	Easton Stadium • Los Angeles, CA	L 2–3	33–7	5–3
Apr 11	at No. 4 Washington	No. 2	Husky Softball Stadium • Seattle, WA	W 2–1	34–7	6–3
Apr 11	at No. 4 Washington	No. 2	Husky Softball Stadium • Seattle, WA	L 2–3	34–8	6–4
Apr 16	No. 13 California	No. 3	Rita Hillenbrand Memorial Stadium • Tucson, AZ	L 2–4	34–9	6–5
Apr 16	No. 13 California	No. 3	Rita Hillenbrand Memorial Stadium • Tucson, AZ	W 3–2	35–9	7–5
Apr 17	No. 10 Stanford	No. 3	Rita Hillenbrand Memorial Stadium • Tucson, AZ	W 3–2	36–9	8–5
Apr 17	No. 10 Stanford	No. 3	Rita Hillenbrand Memorial Stadium • Tucson, AZ	W 1–0	37–9	9–5
Apr 24	at No. 17 Oregon	No. 3	Howe Field • Eugene, OR	L 1–2	37–10	9–6
Apr 24	at No. 17 Oregon	No. 3	Howe Field • Eugene, OR	W 6–5	38–10	10–6
Apr 25	at No. 10 Oregon State	No. 3	Corvallis, OR	W 2–0	39–10	11–6
Apr 25	at No. 10 Oregon State	No. 3	Corvallis, OR	W 11–2	40–10	12–6

May
Date	Opponent	Rank	Site/stadium	Score	Overall record	Pac-10 record
May 1	at No. 16 California	No. 3	Levine-Fricke Field • Berkeley, CA	W 1–0 ^{(10)}	41–10	13–6
May 1	at No. 16 California	No. 3	Levine-Fricke Field • Berkeley, CA	L 1–5	41–11	13–7
May 2	at No. 15 Stanford	No. 3	Boyd & Jill Smith Family Stadium • Stanford, CA	W 3–1	42–11	14–7
May 2	at No. 15 Stanford	No. 3	Boyd & Jill Smith Family Stadium • Stanford, CA	L 0–1	42–12	14–8
May 7	No. 1 UCLA	No. 3	Rita Hillenbrand Memorial Stadium • Tucson, AZ	W 6–4 ^{(8)}	43–12	15–8
May 7	No. 1 UCLA	No. 3	Rita Hillenbrand Memorial Stadium • Tucson, AZ	L 0–8 ^{(5)}	43–13	15–9
May 8	No. 5 Washington	No. 3	Rita Hillenbrand Memorial Stadium • Tucson, AZ	W 2–0	44–13	16–9
May 8	No. 5 Washington	No. 3	Rita Hillenbrand Memorial Stadium • Tucson, AZ	W 3–0	45–13	17–9
May 15	No. 16 Arizona State	No. 3	Rita Hillenbrand Memorial Stadium • Tucson, AZ	W 10–0 ^{(5)}	46–13	18–9
May 15	No. 16 Arizona State	No. 3	Rita Hillenbrand Memorial Stadium • Tucson, AZ	W 7–0	47–13	19–9

Postseason

NCAA Regional
Date	Opponent	Rank	Site/stadium	Score	Overall record	NCAAT record
May 20	East Carolina	No. 3	Rita Hillenbrand Memorial Stadium • Tucson, AZ	W 9–1 ^{(5)}	48–13	1–0
May 21	Southwest Texas State	No. 3	Rita Hillenbrand Memorial Stadium • Tucson, AZ	W 8–0	49–13	2–0
May 22	Maryland	No. 3	Rita Hillenbrand Memorial Stadium • Tucson, AZ	L 3–7	49–14	2–1
May 22	Kansas	No. 3	Rita Hillenbrand Memorial Stadium • Tucson, AZ	W 6–1	50–14	3–1
May 23	Maryland	No. 3	Rita Hillenbrand Memorial Stadium • Tucson, AZ	W 10–0 ^{(5)}	51–14	4–1
May 23	Maryland	No. 3	Rita Hillenbrand Memorial Stadium • Tucson, AZ	W 8–0 ^{(5)}	52–14	5–1

NCAA Women's College World Series
Date	Opponent	Rank	Site/stadium	Score	Overall record	WCWS Record
May 27	No. 17 California	No. 3	ASA Hall of Fame Stadium • Oklahoma City, OK	W 3–0	53–14	1–0
May 28	No. 6 Washington	No. 3	ASA Hall of Fame Stadium • Oklahoma City, OK	L 0–3	53–15	1–1
May 29	No. 18 DePaul	No. 3	ASA Hall of Fame Stadium • Oklahoma City, OK	L 0–1	53–16	1–2

== Ranking movements ==
Ranking movements Legend: ██ Increase in ranking ██ Decrease in ranking
	Week												
Poll	Pre	1	2	3	4	5	6	7	8	9	10	11	Final
NFCA/USA Today	2	2	2	2	2	2	2	3	3	3	3	3	6
