= 1999 Big 12 Conference softball tournament =

- Teams: 10
- Finals site: ASA Hall of Fame Stadium; Oklahoma City, OK
- Champions: Texas (1st title)
- Runner-up: Nebraska (2nd title game)
- Winning coach: Connie Clark (1st title)
- MVP: Jennifer Lizama (Nebraska)
- Attendance: 4,865

1999 Big 12 Conference softball standings
	Conf.				Overall
Team	W		L	PCT	W		L	PCT
No. 23 Oklahoma ‍†‍‍^{y}	11	–	3	.786	40	–	16	.714
No. 18 Texas ‍‍‡‍^{y}	10	–	4	.714	45	–	17	.726
No. 15 Missouri ‍‍‍^{y}	10	–	5	.667	41	–	21	.661
No. 20 Nebraska ‍‍‍^{y}	10	–	8	.556	35	–	21	.625
Kansas ‍‍‍^{y}	8	–	8	.500	31	–	30	.508
No. 24 Texas Tech ‍‍‍^{y}	6	–	7	.462	36	–	31	.537
Texas A&M ‍‍‍^{y}	7	–	11	.389	41	–	22	.651
Oklahoma State ‍‍‍	4	–	8	.333	21	–	24	.467
Iowa State ‍‍‍	5	–	11	.313	23	–	30	.434
Baylor ‍‍‍	5	–	11	.313	30	–	25	.545
† – Conference champion ‡ – Tournament champion y – Invited to the NCAA tournament Rankings from NFCA/USA Today

The 1999 Big 12 Conference softball tournament was held at ASA Hall of Fame Stadium in Oklahoma City, OK from May 12 through May 15, 1999. Texas won their first conference tournament and earned the Big 12 Conference's automatic bid to the 1999 NCAA Division I softball tournament.

Oklahoma, Texas, Missouri, Nebraska, Kansas, Texas Tech and Texas A&M received bids to the NCAA tournament.

== Standings ==
Place	Seed	Team	Conference			Overall		
Place	Seed	Team	W	L	%	W	L	%
1	1	Oklahoma	11	3	.786	40	16	.714
2	2	Texas	10	4	.714	45	17	.726
3	3	Missouri	10	5	.667	41	21	.661
4	4	Nebraska	10	8	.556	35	21	.625
5	5	Kansas	8	8	.500	31	30	.508
6	6	Texas Tech	6	7	.462	36	31	.537
7	7	Texas A&M	7	11	.389	41	22	.651
8	8	Oklahoma State	4	8	.333	21	24	.467
9	9	Iowa State	5	11	.313	23	30	.434
9	10	Baylor	5	11	.313	30	25	.545

== Schedule ==
Game	Time	Matchup	Location	Attendance
Day 1 – Wednesday, May 12
1	5:00 p.m.	#8 Oklahoma State 1, #9 Iowa State 0	ASA Stadium	334
2	7:30 p.m.	#7 Texas A&M 9, #10 Baylor 3	ASA Stadium	334
Day 2 – Thursday, May 13
3	10:00 a.m.	#1 Oklahoma 5, #8 Oklahoma State 0	ASA Stadium	235
4	10:00 a.m.	#4 Nebraska 1, #5 Kansas 0	Field 2	235
5	12:30 p.m.	#2 Texas 6, #7 Texas A&M 0	ASA Stadium	758
6	12:30 p.m.	#3 Missouri 5, #6 Texas Tech 2	Field 2	758
7	3:00 p.m.	#5 Kansas 4, #8 Oklahoma State 3	ASA Stadium	758
8	3:00 p.m.	#6 Texas Tech 4, #7 Texas A&M 0	Field 2	758
9	5:30 p.m.	#4 Nebraska 2, #1 Oklahoma 0	ASA Stadium	538
10	8:00 p.m.	#2 Texas 8, #3 Missouri 6 (8)	ASA Stadium	538
Day 3 – Friday, May 14
11	10:00 a.m.	#6 Texas Tech 2, #1 Oklahoma 1 (9)	ASA Stadium	399
12	12:30 p.m.	#5 Kansas 1, #3 Missouri 0	ASA Stadium	399
13	5:30 p.m.	#2 Texas 1, #6 Texas Tech 0 (11)	ASA Stadium	447
14	8:00 p.m.	#4 Nebraska 6, #5 Kansas 5 (8)	ASA Stadium	447
Day 4 – Saturday, May 15
15	2:00 p.m.	#2 Texas 4, #4 Nebraska 2	ASA Stadium	395
Game times in CDT. Rankings denote tournament seed.

== All-Tournament Team ==
Position	Player	School
MOP	Jennifer Lizama	Nebraska
2B/SS	Nikki Cockrell	Texas
SS	Courtney Wright	Kansas
IF	Jennifer Lizama	Nebraska
IF	Cindy Roethemeyer	Nebraska
C	Ashli Barrett	Oklahoma
OF	Stacy Gemeinhardt	Missouri
OF	Jane Teixeira	Texas
OF	Tiffiny Valdehueza	Texas
OF	Sandy Butler	Texas Tech
P	Jenny Voss	Nebraska
P	Leigh Ann Walker	Nebraska
P/UTL	Christa Williams	Texas
