= 1999 Washington Huskies softball team =

American college softball season

1999 Washington Huskies softball

NCAA Regional No. 3 champion

Women's College World Series, runner-up
- Conference: Pacific-10 Conference
- Record: 51–18 (15–12 Pac-10)
- Head coach: Teresa Wilson (7th season)
- Home stadium: Husky Softball Stadium

1999 Pacific-10 Conference softball standings
	Conf.				Overall
Team	W		L	PCT	W		L	PCT
No. 1 UCLA ‍†‍‍^{y}	22	–	6	.786	63	–	6	.913
No. 6 Arizona ‍‍‍^{y}	19	–	9	.679	53	–	16	.768
No. 2 Washington ‍‍‍^{y}	15	–	12	.556	51	–	18	.739
No. 10 Oregon State ‍‍‍^{y}	14	–	14	.500	47	–	25	.653
No. 4 California ‍‍‍^{y}	13	–	14	.481	51	–	22	.699
No. 25 Oregon ‍‍‍^{y}	10	–	18	.357	40	–	29	.580
Stanford ‍‍‍^{y}	10	–	18	.357	40	–	25	.615
No. 7 Arizona State ‍‍‍^{y}	8	–	20	.286	41	–	28	.594
† – Conference champion y – Invited to the NCAA tournament As of June 30, 1999; Rankings from NFCA/USA Today

The 1999 Washington Huskies softball team represented the University of Washington in the 1999 NCAA Division I softball season. The Huskies were coached by Teresa Wilson, who led her seventh season. The Huskies finished with a record of 51–18, and finished third in the Pacific-10 Conference with a 15–12 record.

The Huskies were invited to the 1999 NCAA Division I Softball Tournament, where they swept the NCAA Regional No. 3 and then completed a run to the title game of the Women's College World Series where they fell to champion UCLA.

== Personnel ==
=== Roster ===
1999 Washington Huskies roster
Pitchers: 6 - Jamie Graves - Junior; 16 - Shannon Walsh - Freshman; 21 - Bridget Wilcox - Freshman; 23 - Jennifer Spediacci - Junior; Catchers: 11 - Jeanine Giordano - Junior; 31 - Jenny Topping - Freshman	Infielders: 4 - Melissa Downs - Junior; 5 - Christie Rosenblad - Sophomore; 7 - Kim DePaul - Sophomore; 9 - Becky Newbry - Senior; 10 - Rosie Leutzinger - Junior; 20 - Jenn Sumsky - Freshman	Outfielders: 1 - Becky Simpson - Freshman; 14 - Erin Helgeland - Junior; 15 - Jessica Bork - Freshman; 18 - Kelly Hauxhurst - Sophomore

=== Coaches ===
2018 Washington Huskies softball coaching staff
- Teresa Wilson - Head coach - 7th season
- Jennifer Cline - Assistant coach - 2nd season
- Eve Gaw - Assistant coach - 1st season

== Schedule ==
Legend
	Washington win
	Washington loss
*	Non-Conference game

1999 Washington Huskies softball game log
Regular season

February
Date	Opponent	Rank	Site/stadium	Score	Overall record	Pac-10 record
Feb 5	vs New Mexico State*	No. 4	Rita Hillenbrand Memorial Stadium • Tucson, AZ (Arizona Classic)	W 2–1	1–0	
Feb 5	vs New Mexico State*	No. 4	Rita Hillenbrand Memorial Stadium • Tucson, AZ (Arizona Classic)	W 5–0	2–0	
Feb 6	vs No. 24 UIC*	No. 4	Rita Hillenbrand Memorial Stadium • Tucson, AZ (Arizona Classic)	W 9–0^{5}	3–0	
Feb 6	vs No. 24 UIC*	No. 4	Rita Hillenbrand Memorial Stadium • Tucson, AZ (Arizona Classic)	W 8–1	4–0	
Feb 7	at No. 2 Arizona*	No. 4	Rita Hillenbrand Memorial Stadium • Tucson, AZ (Arizona Classic)	L 2–3	4–1	
Feb 19	vs No. 5 Michigan*	No. 4	Florida Softball Stadium • Gainesville, FL (Louisville Slugger Classic)	W 8–0^{6}	5–1	
Feb 19	vs No. 5 Michigan*	No. 4	Florida Softball Stadium • Gainesville, FL (Louisville Slugger Classic)	W 6–3	6–1	
Feb 20	at No. 20 Florida*	No. 4	Florida Softball Stadium • Gainesville, FL (Louisville Slugger Classic)	W 3–0	7–1	
Feb 20	at No. 20 Florida*	No. 4	Florida Softball Stadium • Gainesville, FL (Louisville Slugger Classic)	W 8–0^{5}	8–1	
Feb 21	vs Virginia Tech*	No. 4	Florida Softball Stadium • Gainesville, FL (Louisville Slugger Classic)	W 5–0	9–1	
Feb 26	vs Missouri*	No. 4	Golden Park • Columbus, GA (NFCA Leadoff Classic)	W 2–0	10–1	
Feb 26	vs No. 9 LSU*	No. 4	Golden Park • Columbus, GA (NFCA Leadoff Classic)	W 4–2	11–1	
Feb 27	vs Connecticut*	No. 4	Golden Park • Columbus, GA (NFCA Leadoff Classic)	W 7–0	12–1	
Feb 27	vs Stanford*	No. 4	Golden Park • Columbus, GA (NFCA Leadoff Classic)	W 3–0	13–1	
Feb 28	vs DePaul*	No. 4	Golden Park • Columbus, GA (NFCA Leadoff Classic)	L 2–6	13–2	

March
Date	Opponent	Rank	Site/stadium	Score	Overall record	Pac-10 record
Mar 5	vs Portland State*	No. 4	Titan Softball Complex • Fullerton, CA (Easton Showcase)	W 9–0^{5}	14–2	
Mar 5	vs Auburn*	No. 4	Titan Softball Complex • Fullerton, CA (Easton Showcase)	W 5–3	15–2	
Mar 6	vs Pacific*	No. 4	Titan Softball Complex • Fullerton, CA (Easton Showcase)	W 3–0	16–2	
Mar 6	vs Santa Clara*	No. 4	Titan Softball Complex • Fullerton, CA (Easton Showcase)	W 8–0	17–2	
Mar 7	vs Illinois State*	No. 4	Titan Softball Complex • Fullerton, CA (Easton Showcase)	L 2–3	17–3	
Mar 7	vs Northwestern*	No. 4	Titan Softball Complex • Fullerton, CA (Easton Showcase)	W 6–5	18–3	
Mar 18	vs No. 5 Oklahoma*	No. 4	Titan Softball Complex • Fullerton, CA (Pony/Kia Klassic)	W 4–0	19–3	
Mar 18	vs Florida*	No. 4	Titan Softball Complex • Fullerton, CA (Pony/Kia Klassic)	W 7–0	20–3	
Mar 19	vs UNLV*	No. 4	Titan Softball Complex • Fullerton, CA (Pony/Kia Klassic)	L 3–5	20–4	
Mar 19	vs Liberty*	No. 4	Titan Softball Complex • Fullerton, CA (Pony/Kia Klassic)	W 4–1	21–4	
Mar 20	vs No. 7 Southwestern Louisiana*	No. 4	Titan Softball Complex • Fullerton, CA (Pony/Kia Klassic)	L 4–5^{12}	21–5	
Mar 22	Ohio State*	No. 4	Husky Softball Stadium • Seattle, WA	W 4–1	22–5	
Mar 27	No. 7 Stanford	No. 5	Husky Softball Stadium • Seattle, WA	L 1–4	22–6	0–1
Mar 27	No. 7 Stanford	No. 5	Husky Softball Stadium • Seattle, WA	W 6–0	23–6	1–1
Mar 28	No. 13 California	No. 5	Husky Softball Stadium • Seattle, WA	W 2–1^{8}	24–6	2–1

April
Date	Opponent	Rank	Site/stadium	Score	Overall record	Pac-10 record
Apr 3	No. 1 UCLA	No. 4	Husky Softball Stadium • Seattle, WA	W 4–1	25–6	3–1
Apr 3	No. 1 UCLA	No. 4	Husky Softball Stadium • Seattle, WA	L 3–7	25–7	3–2
Apr 10	No. 7 Arizona State	No. 4	Husky Softball Stadium • Seattle, WA	W 1–0	26–7	4–2
Apr 10	No. 7 Arizona State	No. 4	Husky Softball Stadium • Seattle, WA	L 0–1^{8}	26–8	4–3
Apr 11	No. 2 Arizona	No. 4	Husky Softball Stadium • Seattle, WA	L 1–2^{8}	26–9	4–4
Apr 11	No. 2 Arizona	No. 4	Husky Softball Stadium • Seattle, WA	W 9–0^{6}	27–9	5–4
Apr 16	at Portland State*	No. 4	Delta Park • Portland, OR	W 7–0	28–9	
Apr 16	at Portland State*	No. 4	Delta Park • Portland, OR	W 6–1	29–9	
Apr 17	at No. 12 Oregon State	No. 4	Ropes-Fetrow Field • Corvallis, OR	L 0–1^{9}	29–10	5–5
Apr 17	at No. 12 Oregon State	No. 4	Ropes-Fetrow Field • Corvallis, OR	L 1–2	29–11	5–6
Apr 18	at No. 14 Oregon	No. 4	Howe Field • Eugene, OR	W 8–5	30–11	6–6
Apr 18	at No. 14 Oregon	No. 4	Howe Field • Eugene, OR	W 5–2	31–11	7–6
Apr 20	Western Washington*	No. 4	Husky Softball Stadium • Seattle, WA	W 3–0	32–11	
Apr 20	Western Washington*	No. 4	Husky Softball Stadium • Seattle, WA	W 4–2	33–11	
Apr 21	Simon Fraser*	No. 5	Husky Softball Stadium • Seattle, WA	W 10–0	34–11	
Apr 24	at No. 12 Stanford	No. 5	Boyd & Jill Smith Family Stadium • Stanford, CA	W 3–2	35–11	8–6
Apr 24	at No. 12 Stanford	No. 5	Boyd & Jill Smith Family Stadium • Stanford, CA	L 3–4	35–12	8–7
Apr 25	at No. 13 California	No. 5	Levine-Fricke Field • Berkeley, CA	L 0–7	35–13	8–8
Apr 25	at No. 13 California	No. 5	Levine-Fricke Field • Berkeley, CA	W 2–0	36–13	9–8
Apr 27	Portland State*	No. 5	Husky Softball Stadium • Seattle, WA	W10–0^{5}	37–13	
Apr 27	Portland State*	No. 5	Husky Softball Stadium • Seattle, WA	W 8–0^{6}	38–13	

May
Date	Opponent	Rank	Site/stadium	Score	Overall record	Pac-10 record
May 1	No. 8 Oregon State	No. 5	Husky Softball Stadium • Seattle, WA	W 4–1	39–13	10–8
May 1	No. 8 Oregon State	No. 5	Husky Softball Stadium • Seattle, WA	W 1–0	40–13	11–8
May 2	No. 18 Oregon	No. 5	Husky Softball Stadium • Seattle, WA	W 11–0^{5}	41–13	12–8
May 2	No. 18 Oregon	No. 5	Husky Softball Stadium • Seattle, WA	L 3–4^{11}	41–14	12–9
May 7	at No. 13 Arizona State	No. 5	Sun Devil Club Stadium • Tempe, AZ	W 7–1	42–14	13–9
May 7	at No. 13 Arizona State	No. 5	Sun Devil Club Stadium • Tempe, AZ	W 1–0	43–14	14–9
May 8	at No. 3 Arizona	No. 5	Rita Hillenbrand Memorial Stadium • Tucson, AZ	L 1–2	43–15	14–10
May 8	at No. 3 Arizona	No. 5	Rita Hillenbrand Memorial Stadium • Tucson, AZ	L 0–3	43–16	14–11
May 15	at No. 1 UCLA	No. 6	Easton Stadium • Los Angeles, CA	L 2–0	43–17	14–12
May 15	at No. 1 UCLA	No. 6	Easton Stadium • Los Angeles, CA	W 1–0	44–17	15–12

Postseason

NCAA Regional No. 3
Date	Opponent	Rank	Site/stadium	Score	Overall record	NCAAT record
May 20	Colgate	No. 6	Husky Softball Stadium • Seattle, WA	W 8–0^{6}	45–17	1–0
May 21	No. 24 Tennessee	No. 6	Husky Softball Stadium • Seattle, WA	W 12–1^{5}	46–17	2–0
May 22	Cal State Fullerton	No. 6	Husky Softball Stadium • Seattle, WA	W 1–0^{9}	47–17	3–0
May 23	Hawaii	No. 6	Husky Softball Stadium • Seattle, WA	W 3–0	48–17	4–0

NCAA Women's College World Series
Date	Opponent	Rank (Seed)	Site/stadium	Score	Overall record	WCWS Record
May 27	No. 16 Arizona State	No. 6	ASA Hall of Fame Stadium • Oklahoma City, OK	W 4–1	49–17	1–0
May 28	No. 3 Arizona	No. 6	ASA Hall of Fame Stadium • Oklahoma City, OK	W 3–0	50–17	2–0
May 30	No. 17 California	No. 6	ASA Hall of Fame Stadium • Oklahoma City, OK	W 3–0	51–17	3–0
May 31	No. 1 UCLA	No. 6	ASA Hall of Fame Stadium • Oklahoma City, OK	L 2–3	51–18	3–1

== Ranking movements ==
Ranking movements Legend: ██ Increase in ranking ██ Decrease in ranking
	Week												
Poll	Pre	1	2	3	4	5	6	7	8	9	10	11	Final
NFCA/USA Today	4	4	4	4	5	4	4	4	5	5	5	6	2
