= 1999 UCLA Bruins softball team =

American college softball season

1999 UCLA Bruins softball

National Champion NCAA Regional champion Pac-10 champion
- Conference: Pacific-10 Conference
- Record: 63–6 (22–6 Pac-10)
- Head coach: Sue Enquist (11th season)
- Home stadium: Easton Stadium

1999 Pacific-10 Conference softball standings
	Conf.				Overall
Team	W		L	PCT	W		L	PCT
No. 1 UCLA ‍†‍‍^{y}	22	–	6	.786	63	–	6	.913
No. 6 Arizona ‍‍‍^{y}	19	–	9	.679	53	–	16	.768
No. 2 Washington ‍‍‍^{y}	15	–	12	.556	51	–	18	.739
No. 10 Oregon State ‍‍‍^{y}	14	–	14	.500	47	–	25	.653
No. 4 California ‍‍‍^{y}	13	–	14	.481	51	–	22	.699
No. 25 Oregon ‍‍‍^{y}	10	–	18	.357	40	–	29	.580
Stanford ‍‍‍^{y}	10	–	18	.357	40	–	25	.615
No. 7 Arizona State ‍‍‍^{y}	8	–	20	.286	41	–	28	.594
† – Conference champion y – Invited to the NCAA tournament As of June 30, 1999; Rankings from NFCA/USA Today

The 1999 UCLA Bruins softball team represented the University of California, Los Angeles in the 1999 NCAA Division I softball season. The Bruins were coached by Sue Enquist, in her eleventh season. The Bruins played their home games at Easton Stadium and finished with a record of 63–6. They competed in the Pacific-10 Conference, where they finished first with a 22–6 record.

The Bruins were invited to the 1999 NCAA Division I softball tournament, where they swept the West Regional and then completed a run through the Women's College World Series to claim their eighth Women's College World Series Championship. The Bruins had earlier claimed an AIAW title in 1978 and NCAA titles in 1982, 1984, 1988, 1989, 1990, 1992, and 1995. The 1995 championship was vacated by the NCAA.

== Personnel ==
=== Roster ===
1999 UCLA Bruins roster
Pitchers: 7 – Amanda Freed – Freshman; 12 – Stephanie Swenson – Sophomore; 14 – Erin Weiler – Senior; 22 – Courtney Dale – Sophomore; Catchers: 4 – Marin Noack – Sophomore; 19 – Carissa Millsap – Senior; 32 – Julie Marshall – Junior; 33 – Stacey Nuveman – Sophomore	Infielders: 6 – Jenny Gardner – Sophomore; 10 – Crissy Buck – Freshman; 18 – Julie Adams – Junior; Utility: 1 – Casey Hiraiwa – Sophomore; 8 – Lesley Feldman – Senior; 9 – Lyndsey Klein – Junior	Outfielders: 2 – Erin Rahn – Freshman; 3 – Lupe Brambila – Sophomore; 5 – Karen Hoshizaki – Senior; 44 – Christie Ambrosi – Junior

=== Coaches ===
1999 UCLA Bruins softball coaching staff
- Sue Enquist – Head coach – 11th season
- Kelly Inouye-Perez – Assistant coach – 6th season
- Lisa Fernandez – Assistant coach – 3rd season

== Schedule ==
Legend
	UCLA win
	UCLA loss
*	Non-Conference game

1999 UCLA Bruins softball game log
Regular season

February
Date	Opponent	Rank	Site/stadium	Score	Overall record	Pac-10 record
Feb 5	Santa Clara*	No. 3	Easton Stadium • Los Angeles, CA	W 14–1^{5}	1–0	
Feb 5	Santa Clara*	No. 3	Easton Stadium • Los Angeles, CA	W 3–0	2–0	
Feb 12	vs Mississippi State*	No. 3	Rose Mofford Sports Complex • Phoenix, AZ	W 5–0	3–0	
Feb 12	vs Maryland*	No. 3	Rose Mofford Sports Complex • Phoenix, AZ	W 11–0^{5}	4–0	
Feb 13	vs Utah*	No. 3	Rose Mofford Sports Complex • Phoenix, AZ	W 8–0^{5}	5–0	
Feb 13	vs No. 7 Texas*	No. 3	Rose Mofford Sports Complex • Phoenix, AZ	W 5–4^{8}	6–0	
Feb 14	vs New Mexico State*	No. 3	Rose Mofford Sports Complex • Phoenix, AZ	W 2–0	7–0	
Feb 17	Cal State Northridge*	No. 3	Easton Stadium • Los Angeles, CA	W 6–0	8–0	
Feb 17	Cal State Northridge*	No. 3	Easton Stadium • Los Angeles, CA	W 8–0^{5}	9–0	
Feb 19	vs Kent State*	No. 3	Rebel Softball Diamond • Paradise, NV	W 9–0^{6}	10–0	
Feb 19	vs No. 17 Hawaii*	No. 3	Rebel Softball Diamond • Paradise, NV	W 10–2	11–0	
Feb 20	vs Pacific*	No. 3	Rebel Softball Diamond • Paradise, NV	W 9–5	12–0	
Feb 20	vs FIU*	No. 3	Rebel Softball Diamond • Paradise, NV	W 5–0	13–0	
Feb 21	vs Portland State*	No. 3	Rebel Softball Diamond • Paradise, NV	W 13–5^{6}	14–0	
Feb 27	Sacramento State*	No. 3	Easton Stadium • Los Angeles, CA	W 8–2	15–0	
Feb 27	Sacramento State*	No. 3	Easton Stadium • Los Angeles, CA	W 9–1^{5}	16–0	
Feb 28	at No. 13 Long Beach State*	No. 3	LBSU Softball Complex • Long Beach, CA	W 6–1	17–0	
Feb 28	at No. 13 Long Beach State*	No. 3	LBSU Softball Complex • Long Beach, CA	W 7–0	18–0	

March
Date	Opponent	Rank	Site/stadium	Score	Overall record	Pac-10 record
Mar 4	vs No. 6 DePaul*	No. 1	Bulldog Diamond • Fresno, CA	W 1–0	19–0	
Mar 5	vs Long Beach State*	No. 1	Bulldog Diamond • Fresno, CA	W 7–1	20–0	
Mar 5	vs No. 19 Oregon State*	No. 1	Bulldog Diamond • Fresno, CA	W 7–3	21–0	
Mar 6	vs Creighton*	No. 1	Bulldog Diamond • Fresno, CA	W 16–4	22–0	
Mar 6	vs Missouri*	No. 1	Bulldog Diamond • Fresno, CA	W 9–0^{6}	23–0	
Mar 7	at Fresno State*	No. 1	Bulldog Diamond • Fresno, CA	W 2–1	24–0	
Mar 12	vs Mercer*	No. 1	Bulldog Diamond • Fresno, CA	W 8–0^{6}	25–0	
Mar 12	vs Alabama*	No. 1	Bulldog Diamond • Fresno, CA	W 1–0	26–0	
Mar 12	vs Winthrop*	No. 1	Bulldog Diamond • Fresno, CA	W 9–3	27–0	
Mar 16	San Diego*	No. 1	Easton Stadium • Los Angeles, CA	W 7–0	28–0	
Mar 16	San Diego*	No. 1	Easton Stadium • Los Angeles, CA	W 2–1	29–0	
Mar 27	No. 13 California	No. 1	Easton Stadium • Los Angeles, CA	W 4–3	30–0	1–0
Mar 27	No. 13 California	No. 1	Easton Stadium • Los Angeles, CA	W 3–1	31–0	2–0
Mar 28	No. 7 Stanford	No. 1	Easton Stadium • Los Angeles, CA	W 1–0	32–0	3–0
Mar 28	No. 7 Stanford	No. 1	Easton Stadium • Los Angeles, CA	W 1–0	33–0	4–0
Mar 31	at Cal State Northridge*	No. 1	Matador Diamond • Northridge, CA	W 2–1	34–0	
Mar 31	at Cal State Northridge*	No. 1	Matador Diamond • Northridge, CA	W 6–2	35–0	

April
Date–	Opponent	Rank	Site/stadium	Score	Overall record	Pac-10 record
Apr 3	at No. 4 Washington	No. 1	Husky Softball Stadium • Seattle, WA	L 1–4	35–1	4–1
Apr 3	at No. 4 Washington	No. 1	Husky Softball Stadium • Seattle, WA	W 7–3	36–1	5–1
Apr 10	No. 2 Arizona	No. 1	Easton Stadium • Los Angeles, CA	W 6–2	37–1	6–1
Apr 10	No. 2 Arizona	No. 1	Easton Stadium • Los Angeles, CA	W 3–2	38–1	7–1
Apr 11	No. 7 Arizona State	No. 1	Easton Stadium • Los Angeles, CA	W 8–0^{5}	39–1	8–1
Apr 11	No. 7 Arizona State	No. 1	Easton Stadium • Los Angeles, CA	W 6–1	40–1	9–1
Apr 14	Loyola Marymount*	No. 1	Easton Stadium • Los Angeles, CA	W 3–0	41–1	
Apr 14	Loyola Marymount*	No. 1	Easton Stadium • Los Angeles, CA	W 8–0^{6}	42–1	
Apr 17	at No. 14 Oregon	No. 1	Howe Field • Eugene, OR	W 6–1	43–1	10–1
Apr 17	at No. 14 Oregon	No. 1	Howe Field • Eugene, OR	W 16–1^{5}	44–1	11–1
Apr 18	at No. 12 Oregon State	No. 1	Corvallis, OR	W 10–0^{5}	45–1	12–1
Apr 18	at No. 12 Oregon State	No. 1	Corvallis, OR	L 3–5	45–2	12–2
Apr 24	at No. 11 California	No. 1	Levine-Fricke Field • Berkeley, CA	W 6–2	46–2	13–2
Apr 24	at No. 11 California	No. 1	Levine-Fricke Field • Berkeley, CA	W 10–2	47–2	14–2
Apr 25	at No. 12 Stanford	No. 1	Boyd & Jill Smith Family Stadium • Stanford, CA	W 12–1^{5}	48–2	15–2
Apr 25	at No. 12 Stanford	No. 1	Boyd & Jill Smith Family Stadium • Stanford, CA	W 3–0	49–2	16–2

May
Date	Opponent	Rank	Site/stadium	Score	Overall record	Pac-10 record
May 1	No. 18 Oregon	No. 1	Easton Stadium • Los Angeles, CA	W 5–2	50–2	17–2
May 1	No. 18 Oregon	No. 1	Easton Stadium • Los Angeles, CA	L 2–5	50–3	17–3
May 2	No. 8 Oregon State	No. 1	Easton Stadium • Los Angeles, CA	L 3–5	50–4	17–4
May 2	No. 8 Oregon State	No. 1	Easton Stadium • Los Angeles, CA	W 10–1^{5}	51–4	18–4
May 7	at No. 3 Arizona	No. 1	Rita Hillenbrand Memorial Stadium • Tucson, AZ	L 4–6^{8}	51–5	18–5
May 7	at No. 3 Arizona	No. 1	Rita Hillenbrand Memorial Stadium • Tucson, AZ	W 8–0^{5}	52–5	19–5
May 8	at No. 13 Arizona State	No. 1	Tempe, AZ	W 7–1	53–5	20–5
May 8	at No. 13 Arizona State	No. 1	Tempe, AZ	W 4–0	54–5	21–5
May 15	No. 6 Washington	No. 1	Easton Stadium • Los Angeles, CA	W 2–0	55–5	22–5
May 15	No. 6 Washington	No. 1	Easton Stadium • Los Angeles, CA	L 0–1	55–6	22–6

Postseason

NCAA Regional
Date	Opponent	Rank	Site/stadium	Score	Overall record	NCAAT record
May 20	Alabama	No. 1	Easton Stadium • Los Angeles, CA	W 7–0	56–6	1–0
May 21	Creighton	No. 1	Easton Stadium • Los Angeles, CA	W 14–0	57–6	2–0
May 22	Minnesota	No. 1	Easton Stadium • Los Angeles, CA	W 5–0	58–6	3–0
May 23	No. 23 Missouri	No. 1	Easton Stadium • Los Angeles, CA	W 12–5	59–6	4–0

NCAA Women's College World Series
Date	Opponent	Rank	Site/stadium	Score	Overall record	WCWS Record
May 27	No. 18 DePaul	No. 1	ASA Hall of Fame Stadium • Oklahoma City, OK	W 3–2^{9}	60–6	1–0
May 28	No. 2 Fresno State	No. 1	ASA Hall of Fame Stadium • Oklahoma City, OK	W 1–0	61–6	2–0
May 30	No. 18 DePaul	No. 1	ASA Hall of Fame Stadium • Oklahoma City, OK	W 2–1^{8}	62–6	3–0
May 31	No. 6 Washington	No. 1	ASA Hall of Fame Stadium • Oklahoma City, OK	W 3–2	63–6	4–0

== Ranking movements ==
Ranking movements Legend: ██ Increase in ranking ██ Decrease in ranking
	Week												
Poll	Pre	1	2	3	4	5	6	7	8	9	10	11	Final
NFCA/USA Today	3	1	1	1	1	1	1	1	1	1	1	1	1
