= 1999 NCAA Division I softball rankings =

1999 NCAA Division I softball season
- Defending Champions: Fresno State

Tournament

Women's College World Series
- Champions: UCLA (9th (11th overall) title)
- Runners-up: Washington (4th WCWS Appearance)
- Winning Coach: Sue Enquist (5th title)
- WCWS MOP: Julie Adams (UCLA)

Seasons
- ← 1998 2000 →

The following human polls make up the 1999 NCAA Division I women's softball rankings. The NFCA/USA Today Poll is voted on by a panel of 32 Division I softball coaches and ranks to top 25 teams nationally.

== Legend ==
| | Increase in ranking |
| | Decrease in ranking |
| | Not ranked previous week |
| Italics | Number of first place votes |
| (#–#) | Win-loss record |
| т | Tied with team above or below also with this symbol |

== NFCA/USA Today ==
| | Week 0 Jan 27 | Week 1 Mar 3 | Week 2 Mar 10 | Week 3 Mar 17 | Week 4 Mar 24 | Week 5 Mar 31 | Week 6 Apr 7 | Week 7 Apr 14 | Week 8 Apr 21 | Week 9 Apr 28 | Week 10 May 5 | Week 11 May 12 | Week Final June 1 | |
|---|---|---|---|---|---|---|---|---|---|---|---|---|---|---|
| 1. | Fresno State (20) | UCLA (18) (16–0) | UCLA (25) (24–0) | UCLA (25) (27–0) | UCLA (25) (29–0) | UCLA (25) (33–0) | UCLA (25) (36–1) | UCLA (25) (38–1) | UCLA (25) (45–2) | UCLA (25) (49–2) | UCLA (23) (51–4) | UCLA (24) (53–5) | UCLA (25) (63–6) | 1. |
| 2. | Arizona (1) | Arizona (1) (16–1) | Arizona (24–1) | Arizona (24–1) | Arizona (26–3) | Arizona (30–4) | Arizona (32–4) | Fresno State (43–7) | Fresno State (48–7) | Fresno State (52–8) | Fresno State (2) (57–8) | Fresno State (1) (57–8) | Washington (51–18) | 2. |
| 3. | UCLA (4) | Fresno State (6) (12–1) | Fresno State (16–3) | Fresno State (23–4) | Arizona State (29–5) | Fresno State (33–7) | Fresno State (40–7) | Arizona (34–8) | Arizona (37–9) | Arizona (40–10) | Arizona (42–12) | Arizona (45–13) | DePaul (54–14) | 3. |
| 4. | Washington | Washington (13–2) | Washington (18–3) | Washington (18–3) | Fresno State (28–7) | Washington (24–6) | Washington (25–7) | Washington (27–9) | Southwestern Louisiana (43–5) | Michigan (45–7–1) | Southwestern Louisiana (51–9) | Southwestern Louisiana (51–9) | California (51–22) | 4. |
| 5. | Michigan | Oklahoma (16–3) | Oklahoma (18–3) | Oklahoma (23–4) | Washington (21–5) | Southwestern Louisiana (31–5) | Southwestern Louisiana (31–5) | Southwestern Louisiana (37–5) | Washington (41–11) | Washington (36–13) | Washington (41–14) | Michigan (49–9–1) | Fresno State (65–10) | 5. |
| 6. | South Florida | DePaul (9–3) | Arizona State (17–3) | Arizona State (22–5) | Southwestern Louisiana (27–5) | Arizona State (30–8) | Michigan (30–5–1) | Michigan (35–5–1) | Michigan (40–6–1) | Southwestern Louisiana (47–9) | Michigan (46–9–1) | Washington (43–16) | Arizona (53–16) | 6. |
| 7. | Texas | Texas (11–5) | Stanford (19–4) | Southwestern Louisiana (22–2) | Stanford (21–4) | Michigan (25–5–1) | Arizona State (30–10) | Arizona State (31–11) | LSU (38–6) | LSU (44–7) | LSU (46–8) | LSU (50–8) | Arizona State (41–29) | 7. |
| 8. | Nebraska | Arizona State (14–4) | Southwestern Louisiana (16–2) | Stanford (19–4) | Michigan (21–5–1) | Oklahoma (28–9) | Stanford (28–9) | Oklahoma (33–10) | Oregon State (38–13) | Oregon State (39–16) | Southern Miss (48–6) | Southern Miss (48–6) | Southern Miss (48–6) | 8. |
| 9. | LSU | Stanford (13–4) | Michigan (15–5) | South Carolina (26–7) | Oklahoma (25–9) | Stanford (26–7) | South Carolina (34–9) | LSU (32–6) | Oklahoma (36–11) | Oklahoma (37–12) | Oklahoma (38–12) | Oklahoma (38–12) | Southwestern Louisiana (54–11) | 9. |
| 10. | DePaul | Southwestern Louisiana (11–1) | South Carolina (20–5) | Michigan (15–5) | South Carolina (26–7) | South Carolina (31–8) | LSU (28–6) | Stanford (32–11) | Arizona State (34–14) | Arizona State (36–16) | UIC (62–15) | UIC (62–15) | Oregon State (47–25) | 10. |
| 11. | Oklahoma | South Florida (14–7) | Texas (16–8) | Texas (17–8) | LSU (21–5) | LSU (25–5) | Oklahoma (28–9) | South Carolina (37–12) | Texas (35–13) | Southern Miss (46–6) | Oregon State (40–19) | Texas (40–15) | LSU (55–10) | 11. |
| 12. | UMass | LSU (9–3) | Oregon State (21–4) | Oregon State (21–4) | Oregon State (24–7) | Oregon State (27–10) | Oregon (29–10) | Oregon State (31–12) | Stanford (32–15) | UIC (59–14) | Texas (39–15) | Oregon State (42–23) | Maryland (50–22) | 12. |
| 13. | Long Beach State | South Carolina (13–4) | LSU (13–5) | LSU (15–5) | California (27–5) | Oregon (27–10) | Oregon State (27–12) | California (31–10) | California (33–14) | Texas (37–15) | Arizona State (37–19) | UMass (41–8) | UIC (67–17) | 13. |
| 14. | Stanford | Michigan (5–5) | South Florida (21–9) | California (14–5) | Texas (21–10) | California (27–8) | California (28–9) | Oregon (30–13) | UIC (56–13) | South Carolina (43–16) | Stanford (38–19) | South Carolina (46–17) | Michigan State (41–23) | 14. |
| 15. | Oklahoma State | Oregon (11–5) | Oregon (15–6) | UIC (28–9) | UIC (37–10) | Texas (24–12) | Texas (26–12) | Texas (30–12) | Southern Miss (41–5) | Stanford (35–18) | South Carolina (46–17) | Stanford (41–22) | Missouri (40–21) | 15. |
| 16. | Iowa | Nebraska (6–4) | California (17–4) | Oregon (18–6) | Oregon (23–8) | UIC (42–13) | UIC (44–13) | UIC (50–13) | South Carolina (37–6) | California (34–17) | UMass (38–8) | Arizona State (37–22) | Michigan (51–13–1) | 16. |
| 17. | Hawaii | UIC (21–5) | UIC (27–8) | UMass (11–5) | Iowa (20–7–1) | Southern Miss (34–5) | Southern Miss (34–5) | Southern Miss (36–5) | Oregon (32–17) | UMass (34–8) | DePaul (44–11) | California (42–19) | UMass (43–10) | 17. |
| 18. | Arizona State | UMass (6–5) | Minnesota (20–5) | Minnesota (20–5) | Minnesota (20–5) | Texas A&M (31–8) | South Florida (35–13) | South Florida (39–13) | Texas A&M (35–13) | Oregon (35–20) | Oregon (38–22) | DePaul (45–12) | Texas (45–17) | 18. |
| 19. | Alabama | Oregon State (16–3) | DePaul (10–8) | South Florida (24–12) | Southern Miss (27–5) | South Florida (33–13) | Texas A&M (31–) | Texas A&M (33–10) | UMass (30–8) | DePaul (40–11) | California (36–19) | Oregon (39–25) | South Carolina (49–21) | 19. |
| 20. | Florida | California (13–4) | Nebraska (6–4) | New Mexico (21–3) | South Florida (29–13) | Iowa (22–9–1) | New Mexico (32–8) | New Mexico (32–8) | New Mexico (34–9) | New Mexico (38–10) | New Mexico (39–12) | New Mexico (42–12) | Nebraska (35–21) | 20. |
| 21. | Florida State | Minnesota (15–4) | New Mexico (21–3) | Iowa (14–6) | UMass (13–6) | New Mexico (29–8) | UMass (20–8) | UMass (26–8) | South Florida (39–17) | Texas A&M (37–16) | Maryland (45–19) | Maryland (47–19) | Hawaii (35–23) | 21. |
| 22. | Minnesota | New Mexico (21–3) | UMass (6–5) | Southern Miss (23–4) | New Mexico (27–4) | UMass (15–7) | Minnesota (26–10) | DePaul (31–10) | DePaul (33–10) | South Florida (40–22) | Texas A&M (39–18) | Texas A&M (39–18) | Minnesota (46–20) | 22. |
| 23. | Hofstra | Iowa (3–2) | Iowa (8–4) | Texas A&M (21–7) | Texas A&M (26–7) | Minnesota (22–7) | DePaul (23–10) | Missouri (31–14) | Iowa (30–16–1) | Maryland (41–19) | Missouri (37–16) | Missouri (37–16) | Oklahoma (39–15) | 23. |
| 24. | UIC | Hawaii (11–9) | Texas A&M (20–6) | Nebraska (10–6) | DePaul (13–10) | DePaul (19–10) | Missouri (27–12) | Iowa (25–14–1) | Florida Atlantic (41–18) | Missouri (34–16) | South Florida (42–24) | Tennessee (42–23) | Texas Tech (35–31) | 24. |
| 25. | Oregon | Florida (9–4) | Hawaii (14–9) | DePaul (10–8) | Central Michigan (14–4) | Missouri (26–12) | Iowa (22–12–1) | Minnesota (28–13) | Maryland (38–18) | Pacific (31–17) | Pacific (33–18) | Virginia Tech (54–16) | Oregon (40–29) | 25. |
| | Week 0 Jan 27 | Week 1 Mar 3 | Week 2 Mar 10 | Week 3 Mar 17 | Week 4 Mar 24 | Week 5 Mar 31 | Week 6 Apr 7 | Week 7 Apr 14 | Week 8 Apr 21 | Week 9 Apr 28 | Week 10 May 5 | Week 11 May 12 | Week Final June 1 | |
| | | Dropped: 13. Long Beach State; 15. Oklahoma State; 19. Alabama; 21. Florida State; 23. Hofstra | Dropped: 25. Florida | Dropped: 25. Hawaii | Dropped: 24. Nebraska | Dropped: 25. Central Michigan | None | None | Dropped: 23. Missouri; 25. Minnesota | Dropped: 23. Iowa; 24. Florida Atlantic | None | Dropped: 24. South Florida; 25. Pacific | Dropped: 15. Stanford; 20. New Mexico; 22. Texas A&M; 24. Tennessee; 25. Virginia Tech | |
