= 1998 NCAA Division I softball rankings =

1998 NCAA Division I softball season
- Defending Champions: Arizona

Tournament

Women's College World Series
- Champions: Fresno State (1st title)
- Runners-up: Arizona (11th WCWS Appearance)
- Winning Coach: Margie Wright (1st title)
- WCWS MOP: Amanda Scott (Fresno State)

Seasons
- ← 1997 1999 →

The following human polls make up the 1998 NCAA Division I women's softball rankings. The NFCA/USA Today Poll is voted on by a panel of 32 Division I softball coaches and ranks to top 25 teams nationally.

== Legend ==
	Increase in ranking
	Decrease in ranking
	Not ranked previous week
Italics	Number of first place votes
(#–#)	Win–loss record
т	Tied with team above or below also with this symbol

== NFCA/USA Today ==
	Week 0 Jan 24	Week 1 Feb 25	Week 2 Mar 4	Week 3 Mar 11	Week 4 Mar 18	Week 5 Mar 25	Week 6 Apr 1	Week 7 Apr 8	Week 8 Apr 15	Week 9 Apr 22	Week 10 Apr 29	Week 11 May 6	Week Final May 27	
1.	Arizona (25)	Arizona (25) (12–0)	Arizona (25) (18–0)	Arizona (25) (21–2)	Arizona (25) (22–2)	Arizona (25) (30–2)	Arizona (25) (34–2)	Arizona (25) (39–3)	Arizona (25) (43–3)	Arizona (25) (47–3)	Arizona (25) (51–3)	Arizona (25) (57–3)	Fresno State (25)	1.
2.	Fresno State	Washington (8–2)	Michigan (9–2)	Michigan (18–3)	Michigan (18–3)	Michigan (21–3)	Michigan (24–3)	Michigan (29–3)	Michigan (34–3)	Michigan (40–4)	Michigan (44–4)	Michigan (47–4)	Arizona	2.
3.	Washington	Michigan (4–1)	Washington (13–3)	Washington (13–3)	Washington (13–3)	Washington (17–4)	Fresno State (21–4) т	Fresno State (27–4)	Fresno State (29–6)	Washington (35–7)	Fresno State (41–8)	Fresno State (45–10)	Washington	3.
4.	Michigan	Fresno State (2–2)	Oklahoma State (15–2)	Oklahoma State (18–3)	Oklahoma State (22–3)	Fresno State (15–4)	Oklahoma (30–7) т	Washington (26–7)	Washington (30–7)	Fresno State (33–8)	Washington (38–9)	Washington (44–11)	Oklahoma State	4.
5.	Iowa	South Florida (11–2)	Fresno State (4–2)	Fresno State (8–2)	Fresno State (12–2)	Oklahoma (30–7)	Washington (17–6) т	Oklahoma (34–8)	Oklahoma (38–8)	Oklahoma (42–10)	South Florida (54–11)	Nebraska (44–10)	Nebraska	5.
6.	South Carolina	Oklahoma (13–1)	Oklahoma (19–3)	Oklahoma (22–5)	Oklahoma (26–5)	Texas (29–7)	South Florida (43–10)	South Florida (47–10)	South Florida (47–10)	South Florida (51–10)	Oklahoma (44–2)	South Florida (54–11)	Michigan	6.
7.	California	Arizona State (10–1)	South Florida (16–3)	South Florida (23–6)	Hawaii (28–3)	Arizona State (24–6)	Arizona State (26–8)	Nebraska (28–8)	Nebraska (32–8)	Nebraska (36–8)	Nebraska (38–10)	Oklahoma (47–13)	Texas	7.
8.	Colorado State	California (6–2) т	Arizona State (14–3)	Arizona State (14–3)	Arizona State (18–5)	Missouri (20–5)	Nebraska (26–8)	Oklahoma State (28–9) т	Texas (38–11)	Texas (41–12)	Texas (44–12)	Texas (46–14)	South Florida	8.
9.	Kansas	Oklahoma State (8–1) т	Missouri (9–2)	Missouri (16–5)	Missouri (16–5)	South Florida (34–9)	Texas (30–9)	Texas (34–11) т	Hawaii (36–8)	Stanford (29–12)	Stanford (33–14)	Stanford (35–16)	UMass	9.
10.	South Florida	Florida State (8–1) т	Long Beach State (12–4)	Long Beach State (16–5–1)	South Florida (28–9)	Oklahoma State (23–7)	Oklahoma State (25–7)	Arizona State (27–11) т	Oklahoma State (32–11)	LSU (47–6)	LSU (52–7)	Hawaii (45–13)	DePaul	10.
11.	Oklahoma State	South Carolina (3–1)	Hawaii (16–2)	Hawaii (19–3)	Texas (23–6)	Hawaii (30–6)	Missouri (24–7)	Hawaii (32–8)	LSU (43–6) т	Hawaii (36–10)	Oklahoma State (35–15)	DePaul (41–6)	Oklahoma State	11.
12.	UMass	Missouri (7–2)	Florida State (10–5)	Oregon State (15–3)	Nebraska (14–5)	Nebraska (21–7)	Hawaii (32–8)	Stanford (25–8)	Stanford (28–9) т	Oklahoma State (33–14)	Hawaii (41–13)	LSU (53–10)	Stanford	12.
13.	Missouri	Long Beach State (7–3)	California (8–5)	Nebraska (10–4) т	Long Beach State (17–8–1)	Long Beach State (22–8–2)	Stanford (23–6)	LSU (37–6)	Arizona State (27–13) т	Arizona State (32–16)	DePaul (33–5)	Oklahoma State (37–17)	LSU	13.
14.	Long Beach State	Iowa (2–2)	South Carolina (6–4)	Iowa (8–4) т	Stanford (15–4)	Stanford (17–4)	LSU (35–5)	Missouri (27–10)	Florida State (45–15)	Long Beach State (28–12)	Long Beach State (32–13)	Florida State (50–18)	Hawaii	14.
15.	Cal State Northridge	Hawaii (4–2)	Nebraska (9–4)	Stanford (10–3) т	LSU (23–4)	Iowa (14–5)	Long Beach State (23–9–2)	Florida State (42–13)	Missouri (29–14)	DePaul (31–5)	Arizona State (34–18)	Long Beach State (36–16)	Arizona State	15.
16.	Oklahoma	Kansas (7–5)	Iowa (2–2)	LSU (15–2)	Iowa (8–4)	LSU (14–5)	Florida State (38–13)	Minnesota (31–8)	Minnesota (33–11)	Florida State (47–18)	Florida State (50–18)	Arizona State (36–22)	Minnesota	16.
17.	UCLA	Stanford (6–1)	Stanford (10–3)	Florida State (18–9)	Florida State (28–12)	Florida State (32–12)	California (22–13)	Oregon (31–13)	Long Beach State (28–12)	Texas Tech (42–16)	Texas Tech (44–18)	Texas Tech (45–20)	Florida State	17.
18.	Utah	Minnesota (12–3)	Cal State Northridge (9–4)	Texas (20–6)	Oregon State (15–5)	Oregon State (17–8)	Minnesota (26–8)	Long Beach State (24–11–1)	Oregon State (22–13) т	Missouri (31–18)	Iowa (32–14)	Cal State Northridge (36–17)	Long Beach State	18.
19.	Southwestern Louisiana	Colorado State (2–3)	LSU (10–2)	Cal State Northridge (11–5–1)	Oregon (19–6)	California (20–11)	Texas Tech (34–10)	Texas Tech (38–14)	Texas Tech (40–16) т	California (28–19)	Cal State Northridge (34–17)	Iowa (35–16)	Iowa	19.
20.	Central Michigan	LSU (6–2)	Oregon State (11–3)	Minnesota (20–7)	Minnesota (20–7)	Minnesota (20–7)	Iowa (14–8)	California (23–16)	DePaul (25–5) т	Iowa (28–12)	UIC (51–16)	UIC (59–19)	Oregon	20.
21.	Florida State	DePaul (4–2)	Minnesota (14–7)	South Carolina (8–6)	California (15–9)	Cal State Northridge (17–11–1)	Oregon (28–13)	Oregon State (20–13)	California (24–17)	Minnesota (34–14)	California (30–21)	UMass (40–12)	UIC	21.
22.	Michigan State	Texas A&M (11–3)	Kansas (10–8)	California (8–8) т	Cal State Northridge (13–9–1)	Oregon (23–10)	Oregon State (18–11)	Iowa (19–10)	Iowa (24–10)	Oregon State (25–16)	Missouri (36–19)	Minnesota (45–17)	California	22.
23.	Arizona State	Oregon State (8–2)	Colorado State (5–6)	Oregon (15–6) т	Texas Tech (27–7)	Texas Tech (32–10)	Southwestern Louisiana (23–8)	UIC (40–13)	Oregon (32–17)	Cal State Northridge (31–16)	Minnesota (39–16)	Florida (45–18)	Cal State Northridge	23.
24.	DePaul	Cal State Northridge (3–3)	DePaul (4–2)	Southwestern Louisiana (8–3)	Southwestern Louisiana (13–5)	DePaul (10–4)	UIC (38–13)	Southwestern Louisiana (25–8)	UIC (44–15)	UIC (49–16)	UMass (35–12)	California (30–25)	Texas Tech	24.
25.	Tennessee	Utah (0–0) т Southwestern Louisiana (0–0) т	Southwestern Louisiana (4–1)	DePaul (5–3)	Florida (20–10)	Southwestern Louisiana (17–8)	Michigan State (20–7)	Cal State Northridge (23–14)	Cal State Northridge (26–15)	Oregon (33–20)	Florida (41–18)	Missouri (36–20)	Florida	25.
	Week 0 Jan 24	Week 1 Feb 25	Week 2 Mar 4	Week 3 Mar 11	Week 4 Mar 18	Week 5 Mar 25	Week 6 Apr 1	Week 7 Apr 8	Week 8 Apr 15	Week 9 Apr 22	Week 10 Apr 29	Week 11 May 6	Week Final May 27	
		Dropped: 12. UMass; 17. UCLA; 20. Central Michigan; 22. Michigan State	Dropped: 22. Texas A&M; 25. (т) Utah	Dropped: 22. Kansas; 23. Colorado State	Dropped: 21. South Carolina; 25. DePaul	Dropped: 25. Florida	Dropped: 21. Cal State Northridge; 24. DePaul	Dropped: 25. Michigan State	Dropped: 24. Southwestern Louisiana	None	Dropped: 22. Oregon State; 25. Oregon	None	Dropped: Missouri	
