= 1998 Arizona Wildcats softball team =

American college softball season

1998 Arizona Wildcats softball

Pac-10 champion NCAA Regional champion

Women's College World Series, runner-up
- Conference: Pacific-10 Conference
- Record: 67–4 (27–1 Pac-10)
- Head coach: Mike Candrea (13th season)

1998 Pacific-10 Conference softball standings
	Conf.				Overall
Team	W		L	PCT	W		L	PCT
No. 2 Arizona ‍†‍‍^{y}	27	–	1	.964	67	–	4	.944
No. 3 Washington ‍‍‍^{y}	19	–	9	.679	52	–	15	.776
No. 12 Stanford ‍‍‍^{y}	17	–	11	.607	41	–	18	.695
No. 22 California ‍‍‍^{y}	12	–	14	.462	35	–	27	.565
No. 20 Oregon ‍‍‍^{y}	10	–	18	.357	40	–	31	.563
No. 15 Arizona State ‍‍‍^{y}	9	–	19	.321	38	–	27	.585
UCLA ‍‍‍	8	–	18	.308	18	–	27	.400
Oregon State ‍‍‍	8	–	20	.286	27	–	28	.491
† – Conference champion y – Invited to the NCAA tournament As of June 30, 1998; Rankings from NFCA/USA Today

The 1998 Arizona Wildcats softball team represented the University of Arizona in the 1998 NCAA Division I softball season. The Wildcats were coached by Mike Candrea, who led his thirteenth season. The Wildcats finished with a record of 67–4. They competed in the Pacific-10 Conference, where they finished first with a 27–1 record.

The Wildcats were invited to the 1998 NCAA Division I softball tournament, where they swept the Regional and then completed a run to the title game of the Women's College World Series where they fell to champion Fresno State.

== Personnel ==
=== Roster ===
1998 Arizona Wildcats roster
Pitchers: 0 – Becky Lemke – freshman; 2 – Teresa Ayoub – freshman; 13 – Nancy Evans – senior; 62 – Meghann Pricer – freshman; Catchers: 31 – Leah Braatz – senior; 42 – Lindsey Collins – freshman	Infielders: 5 – Katie Swan – sophomore; 7 – Leticia Pineda – senior; 18 – Tiana Hejduk – senior; 21 – Michelle Churnock – junior; 32 – Toni Mascarenas – freshman; 35 – Felecity Willis – freshman	Outfielders: 4 – Nicole Giordano – freshman; 6 – Alison Johnsen – senior; 22 – Erika Hanson – freshman; 24 – Lauren Bauer – freshman; 99 – Chrissy Gil – freshman

=== Coaches ===
1998 Arizona Wildcats softball coaching staff
- Mike Candrea - Head coach - 13th season
- Stacy Hill - Assistant coach - 4th season
- Amy Chellevold - Assistant coach - 3rd season

== Schedule ==
Legend
	Arizona win
	Arizona loss
*	Non-Conference game

1998 Arizona Wildcats softball game log
Regular season

February
Date	Opponent	Rank	Site/stadium	Score	Overall record	Pac-10 record
Feb 6	New Mexico State*	No. 1	Rita Hillenbrand Memorial Stadium • Tucson, AZ	W 10–1	1–0	
Feb 6	New Mexico State*	No. 1	Rita Hillenbrand Memorial Stadium • Tucson, AZ	W 14–1^{5}	2–0	
Feb 7	UIC*	No. 1	Rita Hillenbrand Memorial Stadium • Tucson, AZ	W 9–0	3–0	
Feb 7	UIC*	No. 1	Rita Hillenbrand Memorial Stadium • Tucson, AZ	W 12–2^{6}	4–0	
Feb 13	vs No. 25 Tennessee*	No. 1	Tempe, AZ	W 7–0	5–0	
Feb 14	vs Utah State*	No. 1	Tempe, AZ	W 19–2^{5}	6–0	
Feb 14	vs Texas*	No. 1	Tempe, AZ	W 9–1^{5}	7–0	
Feb 15	vs No. 14 Long Beach State*	No. 1	Tempe, AZ	W 2–1	8–0	
Feb 20	vs Southwest Texas State*	No. 1	Katie Seashole Pressly Softball Stadium • Gainesville, FL	W 2–0	9–0	
Feb 20	vs Southwest Texas State*	No. 1	Katie Seashole Pressly Softball Stadium • Gainesville, FL	W 12–0^{5}	10–0	
Feb 21	at Florida*	No. 1	Katie Seashole Pressly Softball Stadium • Gainesville, FL	W 7–0	11–0	
Feb 21	at Florida*	No. 1	Katie Seashole Pressly Softball Stadium • Gainesville, FL	W 9–0^{5}	12–0	
Feb 27	No. 19 Colorado State*	No. 1	Rita Hillenbrand Memorial Stadium • Tucson, AZ	W 9–1^{6}	13–0	
Feb 27	No. 19 Colorado State*	No. 1	Rita Hillenbrand Memorial Stadium • Tucson, AZ	W 14–1^{5}	14–0	
Feb 28	No. 16 Kansas*	No. 1	Rita Hillenbrand Memorial Stadium • Tucson, AZ	W 8–0^{5}	15–0	
Feb 28	No. 16 Kansas*	No. 1	Rita Hillenbrand Memorial Stadium • Tucson, AZ	W 8–3	16–0	

March
Date	Opponent	Rank	Site/stadium	Score	Overall record	Pac-10 record
Mar 1	McNeese State*	No. 1	Rita Hillenbrand Memorial Stadium • Tucson, AZ	W 11–0^{6}	17–0	
Mar 1	McNeese State*	No. 1	Rita Hillenbrand Memorial Stadium • Tucson, AZ	W 13–0^{5}	18–0	
Mar 6	No. 6 Oklahoma*	No. 1	Rita Hillenbrand Memorial Stadium • Tucson, AZ	W 6–4	19–0	
Mar 6	No. 6 Oklahoma*	No. 1	Rita Hillenbrand Memorial Stadium • Tucson, AZ	L 3–4	19–1	
Mar 7	Texas Tech*	No. 1	Rita Hillenbrand Memorial Stadium • Tucson, AZ	W 10–0^{6}	20–1	
Mar 7	Texas Tech*	No. 1	Rita Hillenbrand Memorial Stadium • Tucson, AZ	L 0–6	20–2	
Mar 8	San Diego State*	No. 1	Rita Hillenbrand Memorial Stadium • Tucson, AZ	W 8–0^{5}	21–2	
Mar 11	at No. 19 Cal State Northridge*	No. 1	Matador Diamond • Northridge, CA	W 8–1	22–2	
Mar 11	at No. 19 Cal State Northridge*	No. 1	Matador Diamond • Northridge, CA	W 5–0	23–2	
Mar 16	Iowa State*	No. 1	Rita Hillenbrand Memorial Stadium • Tucson, AZ	W 9–0^{5}	24–2	
Mar 16	Iowa State*	No. 1	Rita Hillenbrand Memorial Stadium • Tucson, AZ	W 9–0^{5}	25–2	
Mar 19	vs No. 4 Oklahoma State*	No. 1	Titan Softball Complex • Fullerton, CA	W 8–0^{5}	26–2	
Mar 19	at Cal State Fullerton*	No. 1	Titan Softball Complex • Fullerton, CA	W 8–3	27–2	
Mar 20	vs Canisius*	No. 1	Titan Softball Complex • Fullerton, CA	W 8–0^{6}	28–2	
Mar 21	vs Southwest Texas State*	No. 1	Titan Softball Complex • Fullerton, CA	W 9–0^{5}	29–2	
Mar 21	vs No. 5 Fresno State*	No. 1	Titan Softball Complex • Fullerton, CA	W 6–1	30–2	
Mar 22	vs No. 22 Cal State Northridge*	No. 1	Titan Softball Complex • Fullerton, CA	W 8–4	31–2	
Mar 22	No. 11 Texas*	No. 1	Rita Hillenbrand Memorial Stadium • Tucson, AZ	W 2–1	32–2	
Mar 28	at No. 22 Oregon	No. 1	Howe Field • Eugene, OR	W 2–0	33–2	1–0
Mar 28	at No. 22 Oregon	No. 1	Howe Field • Eugene, OR	W 18–11	34–2	2–0
Mar 29	at No. 18 Oregon State	No. 1	Corvallis, OR	W 8–0	35–2	3–0
Mar 29	at No. 18 Oregon State	No. 1	Corvallis, OR	W 13–3^{5}	36–2	4–0

April
Date	Opponent	Rank	Site/stadium	Score	Overall record	Pac-10 record
Apr 3	UCLA	No. 1	Rita Hillenbrand Memorial Stadium • Tucson, AZ	W 16–3^{5}	37–2	5–0
Apr 3	UCLA	No. 1	Rita Hillenbrand Memorial Stadium • Tucson, AZ	W 11–9	38–2	6–0
Apr 4	No. 4 Washington	No. 1	Rita Hillenbrand Memorial Stadium • Tucson, AZ	L 0–9^{5}	38–3	6–1
Apr 4	No. 4 Washington	No. 1	Rita Hillenbrand Memorial Stadium • Tucson, AZ	W 10–0^{5}	39–3	7–1
Apr 7	No. 3 Fresno State*	No. 1	Rita Hillenbrand Memorial Stadium • Tucson, AZ	W 4–3	40–3	
Apr 7	No. 3 Fresno State*	No. 1	Rita Hillenbrand Memorial Stadium • Tucson, AZ	W 6–2	41–3	
Apr 10	No. 10 Arizona State	No. 1	Rita Hillenbrand Memorial Stadium • Tucson, AZ	W 7–2	42–3	8–1
Apr 10	No. 10 Arizona State	No. 1	Rita Hillenbrand Memorial Stadium • Tucson, AZ	W 5–3	43–3	9–1
Apr 18	at No. 20 California	No. 1	Levine-Fricke Field • Berkeley, CA	W 8–4^{9}	44–3	10–1
Apr 18	at No. 20 California	No. 1	Levine-Fricke Field • Berkeley, CA	W 3–0	45–3	11–1
Apr 19	at No. 12 Stanford	No. 1	Boyd & Jill Smith Family Stadium • Stanford, CA	W 11–0^{5}	46–3	12–1
Apr 19	at No. 12 Stanford	No. 1	Boyd & Jill Smith Family Stadium • Stanford, CA	W 5–2	47–3	13–1
Apr 24	No. 25 Oregon	No. 1	Rita Hillenbrand Memorial Stadium • Tucson, AZ	W 8–0^{5}	48–3	14–1
Apr 24	No. 25 Oregon	No. 1	Rita Hillenbrand Memorial Stadium • Tucson, AZ	W 13–1^{5}	49–3	15–1
Apr 25	No. 22 Oregon State	No. 1	Rita Hillenbrand Memorial Stadium • Tucson, AZ	W 14–2^{5}	50–3	16–1
Apr 25	No. 22 Oregon State	No. 1	Rita Hillenbrand Memorial Stadium • Tucson, AZ	W 12–3^{5}	51–3	17–1
Apr 29	at No. 15 Arizona State	No. 1	Tempe, AZ	W 6–0	52–3	18–1
Apr 29	at No. 15 Arizona State	No. 1	Tempe, AZ	W 3–2	53–3	19–1

May
Date	Opponent	Rank	Site/stadium	Score	Overall record	Pac-10 record
May 2	No. 9 Stanford	No. 1	Rita Hillenbrand Memorial Stadium • Tucson, AZ	W 10–3	54–3	20–1
May 2	No. 9 Stanford	No. 1	Rita Hillenbrand Memorial Stadium • Tucson, AZ	W 8–0^{6}	55–3	21–1
May 3	No. 21 California	No. 1	Rita Hillenbrand Memorial Stadium • Tucson, AZ	W 8–0^{5}	56–3	22–1
May 3	No. 21 California	No. 1	Rita Hillenbrand Memorial Stadium • Tucson, AZ	W 7–1	57–3	23–1
May 9	at UCLA	No. 1	Easton Stadium • Los Angeles, CA	W 2–0	58–3	24–1
May 9	at UCLA	No. 1	Easton Stadium • Los Angeles, CA	W 6–0	59–3	25–1
May 10	at No. 4 Washington	No. 1	Husky Softball Stadium • Seattle, WA	W 4–2	60–3	26–1
May 10	at No. 4 Washington	No. 1	Husky Softball Stadium • Seattle, WA	W 4–0	61–3	27–1

Postseason

NCAA Regional
Date	Opponent	Rank	Site/stadium	Score	Overall record	NCAAT record
May 15	Niagara	No. 1	Rita Hillenbrand Memorial Stadium • Tucson, AZ	W 14–0^{5}	62–3	1–0
May 16	Pacific	No. 1	Rita Hillenbrand Memorial Stadium • Tucson, AZ	W 10–0^{5}	63–3	2–0
May 17	Pacific	No. 1	Rita Hillenbrand Memorial Stadium • Tucson, AZ	W 7–0	64–3	3–0

NCAA Women's College World Series
Date	Opponent	Rank	Site/stadium	Score	Overall record	WCWS Record
May 21	No. 13 Oklahoma State	No. 1	ASA Hall of Fame Stadium • Oklahoma City, OK	W 1–0	65–3	1–0
May 22	No. 4 Washington	No. 1	ASA Hall of Fame Stadium • Oklahoma City, OK	W 8–0^{5}	66–3	2–0
May 24	No. 13 Oklahoma State	No. 1	ASA Hall of Fame Stadium • Oklahoma City, OK	W 7–0	67–3	3–0
May 25	No. 3 Fresno State	No. 1	ASA Hall of Fame Stadium • Oklahoma City, OK	L 0–1	67–4	3–1

== Ranking movements ==
Ranking movements Legend: ██ Increase in ranking ██ Decrease in ranking
	Week												
Poll	Pre	1	2	3	4	5	6	7	8	9	10	11	Final
NFCA/USA Today	1	1	1	1	1	1	1	1	1	1	1	1	2
