= 1998 NCAA Division I softball season =

American college softball season

- Defending Champions: Arizona

Tournament

Women's College World Series
- Champions: Fresno State (1st title)
- Runners-up: Arizona (11th WCWS Appearance)
- Winning Coach: Margie Wright (1st title)
- WCWS MOP: Amanda Scott (Fresno State)

Seasons
- ← 1997 1999 →

The 1998 NCAA Division I softball season, play of college softball in the United States organized by the National Collegiate Athletic Association (NCAA) at the Division I level, began in February 1998. The season progressed through the regular season, many conference tournaments and championship series, and concluded with the 1998 NCAA Division I softball tournament and 1998 Women's College World Series. The Women's College World Series, consisting of the eight remaining teams in the NCAA Tournament and held in held in Oklahoma City at ASA Hall of Fame Stadium, ended on May 25, 1998.

== Conference standings ==
1998 Big 12 Conference softball standings
	Conf.						Overall
Team	W		L		T	PCT	W		L		T	PCT
No. 5 Nebraska ‍†‍‡‍^{y}	16	–	0	–	0	1.000	48	–	12	–	0	.800
No. 11 Oklahoma ‍‍‍^{y}	12	–	5	–	0	.706	49	–	15	–	0	.766
No. 7 Texas ‍‍‍^{y}	11	–	5	–	0	.688	49	–	16	–	0	.754
No. 24 Texas Tech ‍‍‍	10	–	7	–	0	.588	45	–	19	–	0	.703
No. 4 Oklahoma State ‍‍‍^{y}	9	–	7	–	0	.563	42	–	19	–	0	.689
Kansas ‍‍‍	7	–	11	–	0	.389	28	–	34	–	0	.452
Texas A&M ‍‍‍	6	–	10	–	1	.382	32	–	25	–	2	.559
Iowa State ‍‍‍	5	–	11	–	0	.313	16	–	27	–	0	.372
Missouri ‍‍‍	5	–	13	–	0	.278	36	–	20	–	0	.643
Baylor ‍‍‍	2	–	14	–	1	.147	20	–	36	–	1	.360
† – Conference champion ‡ – Tournament champion y – Invited to the NCAA tournament Rankings from NFCA/USA Today

1998 Big Ten Conference softball standings
	Conf.						Overall
Team	W		L		T	PCT	W		L		T	PCT
No. 6 Michigan ‍†‍‡‍^{y}	22	–	1	–	0	.957	56	–	7	–	0	.889
Northwestern ‍‍‍	15	–	9	–	0	.625	34	–	19	–	0	.642
No. 16 Minnesota ‍‍‍^{y}	14	–	9	–	0	.609	48	–	21	–	0	.696
No. 19 Iowa ‍‍‍^{y}	14	–	9	–	0	.609	38	–	20	–	0	.655
Michigan State ‍‍‍	11	–	13	–	0	.458	34	–	20	–	0	.630
Ohio State ‍‍‍	10	–	14	–	0	.417	33	–	23	–	0	.589
Penn State ‍‍‍	8	–	14	–	0	.364	21	–	28	–	1	.430
Purdue ‍‍‍	8	–	16	–	0	.333	29	–	30	–	0	.492
Wisconsin ‍‍‍	8	–	16	–	0	.333	19	–	31	–	1	.382
Indiana ‍‍‍	7	–	16	–	0	.304	13	–	31	–	1	.300
† – Conference champion ‡ – Tournament champion y – Invited to the NCAA tournament As of June 1998; Rankings from NFCA/USA Today

1998 Pacific-10 Conference softball standings
	Conf.				Overall
Team	W		L	PCT	W		L	PCT
No. 2 Arizona ‍†‍‍^{y}	27	–	1	.964	67	–	4	.944
No. 3 Washington ‍‍‍^{y}	19	–	9	.679	52	–	15	.776
No. 12 Stanford ‍‍‍^{y}	17	–	11	.607	41	–	18	.695
No. 22 California ‍‍‍^{y}	12	–	14	.462	35	–	27	.565
No. 20 Oregon ‍‍‍^{y}	10	–	18	.357	40	–	31	.563
No. 15 Arizona State ‍‍‍^{y}	9	–	19	.321	38	–	27	.585
UCLA ‍‍‍	8	–	18	.308	18	–	27	.400
Oregon State ‍‍‍	8	–	20	.286	27	–	28	.491
† – Conference champion y – Invited to the NCAA tournament As of June 30, 1998; Rankings from NFCA/USA Today

1998 Southland Conference softball standings
	Conf.						Overall
Team	W		L		T	PCT	W		L		T	PCT
Northwestern Louisiana ‍†‍‍^{y}	23	–	3	–	0	.885	40	–	18	–	0	.690
Nicholls State ‍‍‍	23	–	4	–	0	.852	43	–	16	–	0	.729
Texas–San Antonio ‍‍‍	17	–	8	–	0	.680	31	–	20	–	0	.608
Southeastern Louisiana ‍‍‍	13	–	13	–	0	.500	31	–	27	–	0	.534
Texas–Arlington ‍‍‍	11	–	15	–	0	.423	16	–	29	–	0	.356
Northeast Louisiana ‍‍‍	11	–	16	–	0	.407	23	–	37	–	0	.383
Southwest Texas State ‍‍‍	10	–	15	–	0	.400	15	–	40	–	0	.273
Stephen F. Austin ‍‍‍	10	–	16	–	0	.385	24	–	30	–	0	.444
McNeese State ‍‍‍	7	–	17	–	0	.292	13	–	34	–	0	.277
Sam Houston State ‍‍‍	4	–	22	–	0	.154	14	–	35	–	0	.286
† – Conference champion y – Invited to the NCAA tournament As of May 20, 1998; Rankings from Coaches' Poll

1998 Western Athletic Conference softball standings
	Conf.						Overall
Team	W		L		T	PCT	W		L		T	PCT
No. 1 Fresno State ‍†‍‍	28	–	2	–	0	.933	52	–	11	–	0	.825
No. 14 Hawaii ‍‍‍	22	–	8	–	0	.733	46	–	15	–	1	.750
Utah ‍‍‍	19	–	13	–	0	.594	36	–	21	–	0	.632
Colorado State ‍‍‍	16	–	13	–	0	.552	30	–	21	–	0	.588
San Diego State ‍‍‍	14	–	17	–	0	.452	24	–	35	–	0	.407
UNLV ‍‍‍	13	–	19	–	0	.406	21	–	30	–	0	.412
San Jose State ‍‍‍	11	–	21	–	0	.344	26	–	33	–	0	.441
Tulsa ‍‍‍	8	–	22	–	0	.267	20	–	36	–	0	.357
New Mexico ‍‍‍	8	–	24	–	0	.250	23	–	40	–	0	.365
† – Conference champion y – Invited to the NCAA tournament Rankings from NFCA/USA Today

== Women's College World Series ==
The 1998 NCAA Women's College World Series took place from May 21 to May 25, 1998 in Oklahoma City.

Round of 16
Arizona	1
Oklahoma State	0
Washington	1
UMass	0
Oklahoma State	6
UMass	0
Michigan	7
Texas	2
Nebraska	1
Fresno State	6
Texas	1
Nebraska	2

Quarterfinals
Arizona	8^{5}
Washington	0
Michigan	1
Oklahoma State	3
Michigan	0
Fresno State	8^{5}
Washington	3
Nebraska	1

Semifinals
Arizona	5	—
Oklahoma State	0	—
Fresno State	1	6
Washington	3	1

Finals
Arizona	0
Fresno State	1

== Season leaders ==
Batting

- Batting average: .519 – Tanisha Kemp, Morgan State Bears
- RBIs: 100 – Leah Braatz, Arizona Wildcats
- Home runs: 25 – Kelly Kretschman, Alabama Crimson Tide & Leah Braatz, Arizona Wildcats

Pitching

- Wins: 40-9 – Jenny Voss, Nebraska Cornhuskers
- ERA: 0.42 (8 ER/132.0 IP) – Liza Brown, DePaul Blue Demons
- Strikeouts: 430 – Danielle Henderson, UMass Minutewomen

== Records ==
Freshman class runs: 94 – Kelly Kretschman, Alabama Crimson Tide

Senior class runs: 97 – Alison McCutcheon, Arizona Wildcats

Senior class hits: 117 – Alison McCutcheon, Arizona Wildcats

Team stolen bases: 368 – Alabama State Hornets

== Awards ==
- Honda Sports Award Softball:

Nancy Evans, Arizona Wildcats

YEAR	W	L	GP	GS	CG	SHO	SV	IP	H	R	ER	BB	SO	ERA	WHIP
1998	36	2	42	37	36	20	3	241.2	160	40	34	39	255	0.98	0.82

YEAR	G	AB	R	H	BA	RBI	HR	3B	2B	TB	SLG	BB	SO	SB	SBA
1998	69	191	38	70	.366	44	7	1	15	108	.565%	30	8	1	1

== All America Teams ==
The following players were members of the All-American Teams.

First Team

Position	Player	Class	School
P	Jenny Voss	SO.	Nebraska Cornhuskers
P	Nancy Evans	SR.	Arizona Wildcats
P	Christa Williams	SO.	Texas Longhorns
C	Leah Braatz	SR.	Arizona Wildcats
1B	Traci Conrad	JR.	Michigan Wolverines
2B	Nina Lindenberg	SR.	Fresno State Bulldogs
3B	Toni Mascarenas	FR.	Arizona Wildcats
SS	Ali Viola	SR.	Nebraska Cornhuskers
OF	Alison McCutcheon	SR.	Arizona Wildcats
OF	Laura Berg	SR.	Fresno State Bulldogs
OF	Lauren Bauer	FR.	Arizona Wildcats
DP	Brandy Arthur	SR.	North Carolina Tar Heels
UT	Sara Griffin	SR.	Michigan Wolverines
AT-L	Shannon Beeler	JR.	Minnesota Golden Gophers
AT-L	Nikki Cockrell	JR.	Texas Longhorns
AT-L	Jamie Foutch	JR.	Oklahoma State Cowgirls
AT-L	Amanda Scott	SO.	Fresno State Bulldogs
AT-L	Leticia Pineda	SR.	Arizona Wildcats

Second Team

Position	Player	Class	School
P	Jennifer Spediacci	SO.	Washington Huskies
P	Danielle Henderson	JR.	UMass Minutewomen
P	Jamie Graves	SO.	Washington Huskies
C	Melissa Gentile	SR.	Michigan Wolverines
1B	Kim Gutridge	SR.	UMass Minutewomen
2B	Yvette Healy	JR.	DePaul Blue Demons
3B	Isonette Polonius	JR.	East Carolina Pirates
SS	Kelly Kretschman	FR.	Alabama Crimson Tide
OF	Sandy Butler	FR.	Texas Tech Red Raiders
OF	Tia Morenz	SR.	Hawaii Rainbow Wahine
OF	Kellyn Tate	SR.	Michigan Wolverines
DP	Christie McCoy	SR.	Nebraska Cornhuskers
UT	Tarrah Beyster	SO.	Oregon State Beavers
AT-L	Debbie Bilbao	SR.	Iowa Hawkeyes
AT-L	Sandy Rhea	SR.	Utah Utes
AT-L	Becky Witt	FR.	Fresno State Bulldogs
AT-L	Jodi Reeves	SO.	Texas Longhorns
AT-L	Monica Triner	JR.	USF Bulls

Third Team

Position	Player	Class	School
P	Becky Blevins	JR.	Stanford Cardinal
P	Lana Moran	SO.	Oklahoma Sooners
P	Chelsey Sakizzie	SR.	Florida Gators
C	Julie Crandall	SR.	UNLV Rebels
1B	Chelo Lopez	SR.	CSUN Matadors
2B	Jodi Otten	SR.	LSU Tigers
3B	Heather Stella	JR.	Illinois State Redbirds
SS	Rosie Leutzinger	SO.	Washington Huskies
OF	Michele Acosta	JR.	Stanford Cardinal
OF	Wendy Harrison	SO.	Missouri Tigers
OF	Jody Dean	JR.	UNI Panthers
DP	Marcy Crouch	JR.	Stanford Cardinal
UT	Samantha Iuli	SO.	UIC Flames
AT-L	Monica Armendarez	SR.	Indiana Hoosiers
AT-L	Liza Brown	JR.	DePaul Blue Demons
AT-L	Eve Gaw	SR.	Washington Huskies
AT-L	Desarie Knipfer	SR.	Cal Poly Mustangs
AT-L	Steph Midthun	JR.	Minnesota Golden Gophers
