= 1999 NCAA Division I softball season =

American college softball season

- Defending Champions: Fresno State

Tournament

Women's College World Series
- Champions: UCLA (9th (11th overall) title)
- Runners-up: Washington (4th WCWS Appearance)
- Winning Coach: Sue Enquist (5th title)
- WCWS MOP: Julie Adams (UCLA)

Seasons
- ← 1998 2000 →

The 1999 NCAA Division I softball season, the play of college softball in the United States organized by the National Collegiate Athletic Association (NCAA) at the Division I level, began in February 1999. The season progressed through the regular season, many conference tournaments and championship series, and concluded with the 1999 NCAA Division I softball tournament and 1999 Women's College World Series. The Women's College World Series, consisting of the eight remaining teams in the NCAA Tournament and held in Oklahoma City at ASA Hall of Fame Stadium, ended on May 31, 1999.

== Conference standings ==
1999 Big 12 Conference softball standings
	Conf.				Overall
Team	W		L	PCT	W		L	PCT
No. 23 Oklahoma ‍†‍‍^{y}	11	–	3	.786	40	–	16	.714
No. 18 Texas ‍‍‡‍^{y}	10	–	4	.714	45	–	17	.726
No. 15 Missouri ‍‍‍^{y}	10	–	5	.667	41	–	21	.661
No. 20 Nebraska ‍‍‍^{y}	10	–	8	.556	35	–	21	.625
Kansas ‍‍‍^{y}	8	–	8	.500	31	–	30	.508
No. 24 Texas Tech ‍‍‍^{y}	6	–	7	.462	36	–	31	.537
Texas A&M ‍‍‍^{y}	7	–	11	.389	41	–	22	.651
Oklahoma State ‍‍‍	4	–	8	.333	21	–	24	.467
Iowa State ‍‍‍	5	–	11	.313	23	–	30	.434
Baylor ‍‍‍	5	–	11	.313	30	–	25	.545
† – Conference champion ‡ – Tournament champion y – Invited to the NCAA tournament Rankings from NFCA/USA Today

1999 Big Ten Conference softball standings
	Conf.						Overall
Team	W		L		T	PCT	W		L		T	PCT
No. 16 Michigan ‍†‍‍^{y}	21	–	3	–	0	.875	51	–	13	–	1	.792
No. 22 Minnesota ‍‍‡‍^{y}	16	–	8	–	0	.667	48	–	20	–	0	.706
Penn State ‍‍‍	15	–	9	–	0	.625	35	–	22	–	0	.614
No. 14 Michigan State ‍‍‍^{y}	13	–	9	–	0	.591	41	–	23	–	0	.641
Iowa ‍‍‍	14	–	10	–	0	.583	46	–	26	–	1	.637
Wisconsin ‍‍‍	11	–	12	–	0	.478	29	–	21	–	0	.580
Northwestern ‍‍‍	11	–	13	–	0	.458	30	–	31	–	0	.492
Purdue ‍‍‍	9	–	14	–	0	.391	30	–	26	–	0	.536
Ohio State ‍‍‍	5	–	19	–	0	.208	20	–	32	–	0	.385
Indiana ‍‍‍	3	–	21	–	0	.125	17	–	40	–	0	.298
† – Conference champion ‡ – Tournament champion y – Invited to the NCAA tournament As of June 1999; Rankings from NFCA/USA Today

1999 Pacific-10 Conference softball standings
	Conf.				Overall
Team	W		L	PCT	W		L	PCT
No. 1 UCLA ‍†‍‍^{y}	22	–	6	.786	63	–	6	.913
No. 6 Arizona ‍‍‍^{y}	19	–	9	.679	53	–	16	.768
No. 2 Washington ‍‍‍^{y}	15	–	12	.556	51	–	18	.739
No. 10 Oregon State ‍‍‍^{y}	14	–	14	.500	47	–	25	.653
No. 4 California ‍‍‍^{y}	13	–	14	.481	51	–	22	.699
No. 25 Oregon ‍‍‍^{y}	10	–	18	.357	40	–	29	.580
Stanford ‍‍‍^{y}	10	–	18	.357	40	–	25	.615
No. 7 Arizona State ‍‍‍^{y}	8	–	20	.286	41	–	28	.594
† – Conference champion y – Invited to the NCAA tournament As of June 30, 1999; Rankings from NFCA/USA Today

1999 Southland Conference softball standings
	Conf.						Overall
Team	W		L		T	PCT	W		L		T	PCT
Northwestern State ‍†‍‍	19	–	7	–	0	.731	31	–	26	–	0	.544
Texas–San Antonio ‍‍‍	19	–	8	–	0	.704	26	–	24	–	0	.520
Texas–Arlington ‍‍‍	17	–	10	–	0	.630	31	–	25	–	0	.554
Louisiana–Monroe ‍‍‍	16	–	11	–	0	.593	30	–	34	–	0	.469
McNeese State ‍‍‍	14	–	11	–	0	.560	26	–	34	–	0	.433
Southwest Texas State ‍‍‍^{y}	14	–	13	–	0	.519	34	–	31	–	0	.523
Stephen F. Austin ‍‍‍	13	–	14	–	0	.481	20	–	30	–	0	.400
Southeastern Louisiana ‍‍‍	8	–	18	–	0	.308	25	–	29	–	0	.463
Nicholls State ‍‍‍	7	–	20	–	0	.259	13	–	47	–	0	.217
Sam Houston State ‍‍‍	6	–	21	–	0	.222	18	–	38	–	0	.321
† – Conference champion y – Invited to the NCAA tournament As of May 20, 1999; Rankings from Coaches' Poll

== Women's College World Series ==
The 1999 NCAA Women's College World Series took place from May 27 to May 31, 1999 in Oklahoma City.

Round of 16
UCLA	3^{9}
DePaul	2
Fresno State	1
Southern Miss	0
DePaul	1
Southern Miss	0
Washington	4
Arizona State	1
Arizona	3
California	0
Arizona State	0
California	2

Quarterfinals
UCLA	1
Fresno State	0
Arizona	0
DePaul	1
Washington	3
Arizona	0
Fresno State	0
California	1

Semifinals
UCLA	2^{8}	—
DePaul	1	—
Washington	3	—
California	0	—

Finals
UCLA	3
Washington	2

== Season leaders ==
Batting

- Batting average: .541 – Amanda Michalsky, UTSA Roadrunners
- RBIs: 91 – Stacey Nuveman, UCLA Bruins
- Home runs: 31 – Stacey Nuveman, UCLA Bruins

Pitching

- Wins: 43-6 – Courtney Blades, Southern Miss Golden Eagles
- ERA: 0.24 (8 ER/235.2 IP) – Amanda Scott, Fresno State Bulldogs
- Strikeouts: 497 – Courtney Blades, Southern Miss Golden Eagles

== Records ==
NCAA Division I season consecutive scoreless innings streak: 105.0 – Danielle Henderson, UMass Minutewomen; March 16-May 2, 1999

NCAA Division I single game hits: 8 – Carrie Moreman, Alabama Crimson Tide; March 21, 1999

Freshman class at bats: 259 – Jennifer Tiffany, UIC Flames

Sophomore class home runs: 31 – Stacey Nuveman, UCLA Bruins

== Awards ==
- Honda Sports Award Softball:

Danielle Henderson, UMass Minutewomen

YEAR	W	L	GP	GS	CG	SHO	SV	IP	H	R	ER	BB	SO	ERA	WHIP
1999	30	4	37	33	33	22	0	234.0	72	15	13	40	465	0.39	0.48

== All America Teams ==
The following players were members of the All-American Teams.

First Team

Position	Player	Class	School
P	Courtney Dale	SO.	UCLA Bruins
P	Amanda Scott	JR.	Fresno State Bulldogs
P	Danielle Henderson	SR.	UMass Minutewomen
C	Stacey Nuveman	SO.	UCLA Bruins
1B	Angela Cervantez	JR.	Fresno State Bulldogs
2B	Jennifer Lizama	JR.	Nebraska Cornhuskers
3B	Ashlee Ducote	JR.	LSU Tigers
SS	Amy Berman	JR.	Southern Miss Golden Eagles
OF	Jessica Mendoza	FR.	Stanford Cardinal
OF	Becky Newbry	SR.	Washington Huskies
OF	Kim Pietro	SR.	South Carolina Gamecocks
DP	Erica Beach	FR.	Arizona State Sun Devils
UT	Amanda Freed	FR.	UCLA Bruins
AT-L	Courtney Blades	JR.	Southern Miss Golden Eagles
AT-L	Lynette Velazquez	SR.	Oklahoma Sooners
AT-L	Christie Ambrosi	JR.	UCLA Bruins
AT-L	Danielle Cox	SR.	FSU Seminoles
AT-L	Liza Brown	SR.	DePaul Blue Demons

Second Team

Position	Player	Class	School
P	Nicole Terpstra	SR.	DePaul Blue Demons
P	Jamie Graves	JR.	Washington Huskies
P	Christa Williams	JR.	Texas Longhorns
C	Kellie Wiginton	SO.	Stanford Cardinal
1B	Julie Marshall	JR.	UCLA Bruins
2B	Kelsey Kollen	FR.	Michigan Wolverines
3B	Julie Adams	JR.	UCLA Bruins
SS	Kelly Kretschman	SO.	Alabama Crimson Tide
OF	Catherine Davie	SR.	Michigan Wolverines
OF	Tiffany Clark	JR.	ULL Rajin' Cajuns
OF	Amanda Michalsky	JR.	UTSA Roadrunners
DP	Shavaughne Desecki	FR.	DePaul Blue Demons
UT	Tarrah Beyster	JR.	Oregon State Beavers
AT-L	Samantha Iuli	JR.	UIC Flames
AT-L	Kristen Hunter	FR.	Fresno State Bulldogs
AT-L	Kellie Wilkerson	FR.	Mississippi State Bulldogs
AT-L	Kelli Bruce	SR.	ULL Rajin' Cajuns
AT-L	Brandee McArthur	SR.	Pacific Tigers

Third Team

Position	Player	Class	School
P	Becky Lemke	SO.	Arizona Wildcats
P	Megan Matthews	FR.	South Carolina Gamecocks
P	Kelly Shipman	SR.	Maryland Terrapins
C	Stephenie Little	SR.	Cal State Fullerton Titans
1B	Traci Conrad	SR.	Michigan Wolverines
2B	Nikki Cockrell	SR.	Texas Longhorns
3B	Isonette Polonius	SR.	East Carolina Pirates
SS	Lisa Carey	SO.	Oklahoma Sooners
OF	Becky Witt	SO.	Fresno State Bulldogs
OF	Nicole Giordano	SO.	Arizona Wildcats
OF	Autumn Eastes	SO.	Texas Longhorns
DP	Carrie Moreman	SR.	Alabama Crimson Tide
UT	Monica Triner	SR.	USF Bulls
AT-L	Kirsten Voak	FR.	Arizona State Sun Devils
AT-L	Lauren Bauer	SO.	Arizona Wildcats
AT-L	Lovieanne Jung	FR.	Fresno State Bulldogs
AT-L	Kelli Metzger	SR.	Akron Zips
AT-L	Heather Stella	SR.	Illinois State Redbirds
