= 1998 NCAA Division I softball tournament =

- Teams: 32
- Finals site: ASA Hall of Fame Stadium; Oklahoma City, Oklahoma
- Champions: Fresno State (1st title)
- Runner-up: Arizona (14th WCWS Appearance)
- Winning coach: Margie Wright (1st title)
- MOP: Amanda Scott (Fresno State)
- Attendance: 49,740

The 1998 NCAA Division I softball tournament was the seventeenth annual tournament to determine the national champion of NCAA women's collegiate softball. Held during May 1998, thirty-two Division I college softball teams contested the championship. The tournament featured eight regionals of four teams, each in a double elimination format. The 1998 Women's College World Series was held in Oklahoma City, Oklahoma from May 21 through May 25 and marked the conclusion of the 1998 NCAA Division I softball season. Fresno State won their first NCAA championship by defeating Arizona 1–0 in the final game. Fresno State pitcher Amanda Scott was named Women's College World Series Most Outstanding Player.

== Regionals ==
=== Regional No. 1 ===
First Round
Pacific	6
Hawaii	0
Arizona	14^{5}
Niagara	0
Lower round 1
Hawaii	5
Niagara	1

Semi-Finals
Pacific	0
Arizona	10^{5}
Lower final
Pacific	4
Hawaii	2

Finals
Arizona	7	—
Pacific	0	—

Arizona qualifies for WCWS.

=== Regional No. 2 ===
First Round
Iowa	5
Oregon	2
Nebraska	7
Coastal Carolina	2
Lower round 1
Oregon	11
Coastal Carolina	3

Semi-Finals
Iowa	0
Nebraska	1
Lower final
Iowa	9
Oregon	10

Finals
Nebraska	9	—
Oregon	7	—

Nebraska qualifies for WCWS.

=== Regional No. 3 ===
First Round
DePaul	1
UIC	0
Michigan	12^{5}
Ball State	1
Lower round 1
UIC	6
Ball State	1

Semi-Finals
DePaul	1
Michigan	3
Lower final
DePaul	4^{13}
UIC	0

Finals
Michigan	3	—
DePaul	0	—

Michigan qualifies for WCWS.

=== Regional No. 4 ===
First Round
LSU	2
Long Beach State	0
Washington	2
Northwestern State	0
Lower round 1
Long Beach State	9^{5}
Northwestern State	1

Semi-Finals
LSU	0
Washington	9^{5}
Lower final
LSU	5
Long Beach State	4

Finals
Washington	6	—
LSU	0	—

Washington qualifies for WCWS.

=== Regional No. 5 ===
First Round
UMass	3
Boston College	2
Oklahoma	8^{6}
Harvard	0
Lower round 1
Boston College	2
Harvard	11

Semi-Finals
UMass	1
Oklahoma	0
Lower final
Oklahoma	3
Harvard	0

Finals
UMass	3	—
Oklahoma	1	—

UMass qualifies for WCWS.

=== Regional No. 6 ===
First Round
South Florida	1
Florida	0
Texas	6
Arizona State	0
Lower round 1
Florida	0
Arizona State	1^{8}

Semi-Finals
South Florida	0
Texas	1^{8}
Lower final
South Florida	1
Arizona State	0

Finals
Texas	4	—
South Florida	2	—

Texas qualifies for WCWS

=== Regional No. 7 ===
First Round
Fresno State	6
Minnesota	1
California	3
Cal State Northridge	0
Lower round 1
Minnesota	4
Cal State Northridge	0

Semi-Finals
Fresno State	6
California	3
Lower final
California	2
Minnesota	3

Finals
Fresno State	2	—
Minnesota	1	—

Fresno State qualifies for WCWS.

=== Regional No. 8 ===
First Round
Oklahoma State	4
Florida State	0
Missouri State	5
Stanford	2
Lower round 1
Florida State	0
Stanford	1^{9}

Semi-Finals
Oklahoma State	4
Missouri State	0
Lower final
Missouri State	0
Stanford	3

Finals
Oklahoma State	4	—
Stanford	0	—

Oklahoma State qualifies for WCWS.

== Women's College World Series ==
=== Participants ===
- Arizona
- Nebraska
- Michigan
- Washington
- UMass
- Texas
- Fresno State
- Oklahoma State

=== Results ===
==== Bracket ====
Round of 16
Arizona	1
Oklahoma State	0
Washington	1
UMass	0
Oklahoma State	6
UMass	0
Michigan	7
Texas	2
Nebraska	1
Fresno State	6
Texas	1
Nebraska	2

Quarterfinals
Arizona	8^{5}
Washington	0
Michigan	1
Oklahoma State	3
Michigan	0
Fresno State	8^{5}
Washington	3
Nebraska	1

Semifinals
Arizona	5	—
Oklahoma State	0	—
Fresno State	1	6
Washington	3	1

Finals
Arizona	0
Fresno State	1

=== Championship Game ===
School	Top Batter	Stats.
Fresno State Bulldogs	Nina Lindenberg (2B)	3-3 RBI HR
Arizona Wildcats	Lauren Bauer (LF)	1-2

School	Pitcher	IP	H	R	ER	BB	SO	AB
Fresno State Bulldogs	Amanda Scott (W)	7.0	3	0	0	0	6	24
Arizona Wildcats	Nancy Evans (L)	6.0	8	1	1	0	4	24

=== All-Tournament Team ===
The following players were members of the All-Tournament Team.

Position	Player	School
P	Nancy Evans	Arizona
P	Amanda Scott	Fresno State
P	Jennifer Spediacci	Washington
C	Leah Braatz	Arizona
1B	Angela Cervantez	Fresno State
1B	Leticia Pineda	Arizona
2B	Nina Lindenberg	Fresno State
3B	Kristi Bolle	Oklahoma State
3B	Toni Mascarenas	Arizona
SS	Ali Viola	Nebraska
OF	Laura Berg	Fresno State
OF	Kelly Hauxhurst	Washington

== See also ==
- 1998 NCAA Division II softball tournament
- 1998 NCAA Division III softball tournament
- 1998 NAIA softball tournament
- 1998 NCAA Division I baseball tournament
