= 1998 Fresno State Bulldogs softball team =

Women's softball

1998 Fresno State Bulldogs softball

National Champion NCAA Regional No. 7 champion WAC champion
- Conference: Western Athletic Conference
- Record: 52–11 (28–2 WAC)
- Head coach: Margie Wright (13th season)

1998 Western Athletic Conference softball standings
	Conf.						Overall
Team	W		L		T	PCT	W		L		T	PCT
No. 1 Fresno State ‍†‍‍	28	–	2	–	0	.933	52	–	11	–	0	.825
No. 14 Hawaii ‍‍‍	22	–	8	–	0	.733	46	–	15	–	1	.750
Utah ‍‍‍	19	–	13	–	0	.594	36	–	21	–	0	.632
Colorado State ‍‍‍	16	–	13	–	0	.552	30	–	21	–	0	.588
San Diego State ‍‍‍	14	–	17	–	0	.452	24	–	35	–	0	.407
UNLV ‍‍‍	13	–	19	–	0	.406	21	–	30	–	0	.412
San Jose State ‍‍‍	11	–	21	–	0	.344	26	–	33	–	0	.441
Tulsa ‍‍‍	8	–	22	–	0	.267	20	–	36	–	0	.357
New Mexico ‍‍‍	8	–	24	–	0	.250	23	–	40	–	0	.365
† – Conference champion y – Invited to the NCAA tournament Rankings from NFCA/USA Today

The 1998 Fresno State Bulldogs softball team represented California State University, Fresno in the 1998 NCAA Division I softball season. The Bulldogs were coached by Margie Wright, who led her thirteenth season. The Bulldogs finished with a record of 52–11. They competed in the Western Athletic Conference, where they finished first with a 28–2 record.

The Bulldogs were invited to the 1998 NCAA Division I softball tournament, where they swept the West Regional and then completed a run through the Women's College World Series to claim their first NCAA Women's College World Series Championship.

== Roster ==
1998 Fresno State Bulldogs roster
Pitchers: Lindsay Parker; Kim Peck; Amanda Scott – sophomore; Catchers: Jennifer Jokinen; Jennifer Slaney; Janna Todd; Amber Wall; Carolyn Wilson – senior	Infielders: Angela Cervantez – sophomore; Alicia Dowland – freshman; Nina Lindenberg – senior; Jaime Maxey – junior; Trina Puckett; Vanessa Valenzuela	Outfielders: Laura Berg – senior; Candice Bowlin; Kara Campbell; Daviana Wisener; Becky Witt – freshman

== Schedule ==
Legend
	Fresno State win
	Fresno State loss
*	Non-Conference game

1998 Fresno State Bulldogs softball game log
Regular season

February
Date	Opponent	Site/stadium	Score	Overall record	WAC record
Feb 13	vs Oregon*	Sun Devil Club Stadium • Tempe, AZ	W 9–4	1–0	
Feb 13	vs Alabama*	Sun Devil Club Stadium • Tempe, AZ	W 8–0	2–0	
Feb 14	vs Texas*	Sun Devil Club Stadium • Tempe, AZ	L 1–3	2–1	
Feb 14	vs No. 21 Florida State*	Sun Devil Club Stadium • Tempe, AZ	L 1–2	2–2	
Feb 27	No. 25 Utah	Bulldog Diamond • Fresno, CA	W 2–0	3–2	1–0
Feb 27	Utah	Bulldog Diamond • Fresno, CA	W 10–2	4–2	2–0

March
Date	Opponent	Site/stadium	Score	Overall record	WAC record
Mar 6	Indiana*	Bulldog Diamond • Fresno, CA	W 15–0	5–2	
Mar 7	Tennessee*	Bulldog Diamond • Fresno, CA	W 11–5	6–2	
Mar 7	No. 22 Kansas*	Bulldog Diamond • Fresno, CA	W 2–0	7–2	
Mar 8	vs UCLA*	Bulldog Diamond • Fresno, CA	W 3–2	8–2	
Mar 10	No. 23 Colorado State	Bulldog Diamond • Fresno, CA	W 6–0	9–2	3–0
Mar 10	No. 23 Colorado State	Bulldog Diamond • Fresno, CA	W 7–0	10–2	4–0
Mar 14	at San Diego State	San Diego, CA	W 5–2	11–2	5–0
Mar 14	at San Diego State	San Diego, CA	W 2–0	12–2	6–0
Mar 19	vs No. 25 Florida*	Titan Field • Fullerton, CA	W 4–0	13–2	
Mar 19	vs No. 6 Oklahoma*	Titan Field • Fullerton, CA	L 0–2	13–3	
Mar 20	vs No. 18 Oregon State*	Titan Field • Fullerton, CA	W 8–2	14–3	
Mar 21	vs Georgia State*	Titan Field • Fullerton, CA	W 9–0	15–3	
Mar 21	vs No. 1 Arizona*	Titan Field • Fullerton, CA	L 1–6	15–4	
Mar 23	Harvard*	Bulldog Diamond • Fresno, CA	W 9–0	16–4	
Mar 23	Harvard*	Bulldog Diamond • Fresno, CA	W 8–0	17–4	
Mar 25	at San Jose State	San Jose, CA	W 10–1	18–4	7–0
Mar 25	at San Jose State	San Jose, CA	W 13–0	19–4	8–0
Mar 27	No. 11 Hawaii	Bulldog Diamond • Fresno, CA	W 6–2	20–4	9–0
Mar 28	No. 11 Hawaii	Bulldog Diamond • Fresno, CA	W 2–0	21–4	10–0

April
Date	Opponent	Site/stadium	Score	Overall record	WAC record
Apr 2	Santa Clara*	Bulldog Diamond • Fresno, CA	W 10–0	22–4	
Apr 2	Santa Clara*	Bulldog Diamond • Fresno, CA	W 10–0	23–4	
Apr 4	at UNLV	Rebel Softball Diamond • Paradise, NV	W 9–3	24–4	11–0
Apr 4	at UNLV	Rebel Softball Diamond • Paradise, NV	W 15–13	25–4	12–0
Apr 5	at New Mexico	Albuquerque, NM	W 9–0	26–4	13–0
Apr 5	at New Mexico	Albuquerque, NM	W 5–3	27–4	14–0
Apr 7	at No. 1 Arizona*	Rita Hillenbrand Memorial Stadium • Tucson, AZ	L 3–4	27–5	
Apr 7	at No. 1 Arizona*	Rita Hillenbrand Memorial Stadium • Tucson, AZ	L 2–6	27–6	
Apr 12	San Diego State	Bulldog Diamond • Fresno, CA	W 3–0	28–6	15–0
Apr 12	San Diego State	Bulldog Diamond • Fresno, CA	W 2–1	29–6	16–0
Apr 16	at No. 5 Oklahoma*	OU Softball Complex • Norman, OK	L 2–4	29–7	
Apr 16	at No. 5 Oklahoma*	OU Softball Complex • Norman, OK	L 7–8	29–8	
Apr 17	at Tulsa	Tulsa, OK	W 11–0	30–8	17–0
Apr 17	at Tulsa	Tulsa, OK	W 5–3	31–8	18–0
Apr 18	at Tulsa	Tulsa, OK	W 10–0	32–8	19–0
Apr 18	at Tulsa	Tulsa, OK	W 8–4	33–8	20–0
Apr 21	San Jose State	Bulldog Diamond • Fresno, CA	W 9–1	34–8	21–0
Apr 21	San Jose State	Bulldog Diamond • Fresno, CA	W 9–0	35–8	22–0
Apr 24	New Mexico	Bulldog Diamond • Fresno, CA	W 2–1	36–8	23–0
Apr 24	New Mexico	Bulldog Diamond • Fresno, CA	W 3–2	37–8	24–0
Apr 25	UNLV	Bulldog Diamond • Fresno, CA	W 9–1	38–8	25–0
Apr 25	UNLV	Bulldog Diamond • Fresno, CA	W 10–2	39–8	26–0
Apr 26	Cal Poly*	Bulldog Diamond • Fresno, CA	W 4–1	40–8	
Apr 26	Cal Poly*	Bulldog Diamond • Fresno, CA	W 3–2	41–8	
Apr 28	at Cal State Fullerton*	Titan Field • Fullerton, CA	W 3–0	42–8	
Apr 28	at Cal State Fullerton*	Titan Field • Fullerton, CA	W 10–1	43–8	

May
Date	Opponent	Site/stadium	Score	Overall record	WAC record
May 2	at Utah	Salt Lake City, UT	W 4–3	44–8	27–0
May 2	at Utah	Salt Lake City, UT	L 1–2	44–9	27–1
May 3	at Colorado State	Ram Field • Fort Collins, CO	W 6–1	45–9	28–1
May 3	at Colorado State	Ram Field • Fort Collins, CO	L 2–3	45–10	28–2

Postseason

NCAA Regional No. 7
Date	Opponent	Site/stadium	Score	Overall record	NCAAT record
May 15	No. 22 Minnesota	Bulldog Diamond • Fresno, CA	W 2–1	46–10	1–0
May 16	No. 24 California	Bulldog Diamond • Fresno, CA	W 6–3	47–10	2–0
May 17	No. 22 Minnesota	Bulldog Diamond • Fresno, CA	W 6–0	48–10	3–0

NCAA Women's College World Series
Date	Opponent	Site/stadium	Score	Overall record	WCWS Record
May 21	No. 5 Nebraska	ASA Hall of Fame Stadium • Oklahoma City, OK	W 6–1	49–10	1–0
May 23	No. 2 Michigan	ASA Hall of Fame Stadium • Oklahoma City, OK	W 8–0^{5}	50–10	2–0
May 24	No. 4 Washington	ASA Hall of Fame Stadium • Oklahoma City, OK	L 1–3	50–11	2–1
May 24	No. 4 Washington	ASA Hall of Fame Stadium • Oklahoma City, OK	W 6–1	51–11	3–1
May 25	No. 1 Arizona	ASA Hall of Fame Stadium • Oklahoma City, OK	W 1–0	52–11	4–1
