= 1999 NCAA Division I softball tournament =

- Teams: 48
- Finals site: ASA Hall of Fame Stadium; Oklahoma City, Oklahoma
- Champions: UCLA (9th (10th overall) title)
- Runner-up: Washington (4th WCWS Appearance)
- Winning coach: Sue Enquist (4th title)
- MOP: Julie Adams (UCLA Bruins)

The 1999 NCAA Division I softball tournament was the eighteenth annual tournament to determine the national champion of NCAA women's collegiate softball. Held during May 1999, forty-eight Division I college softball teams contested the championship. The tournament featured eight regionals of six teams, each in a double elimination format. The 1999 Women's College World Series was held in Oklahoma City, Oklahoma from May 25 through May 31 and marked the conclusion of the 1999 NCAA Division I softball season. UCLA won their ninth (Note: The NCAA Record Book shows 1999 as UCLA's eighth championship, as their 1995 title was vacated.) NCAA championship and tenth overall by defeating Washington 3–2 in the final game. It was the first final game since 1990 to not feature Arizona. UCLA infielder Julie Adams was named Women's College World Series Most Outstanding Player.

== Regionals ==
=== Regional No. 1 ===
Host: UCLA
Los Angeles, California

First round
1 | UCLA | 7
6 | Alabama | 0
2 | Cal State Northridge | 7
5 | Missouri | 3
3 | Minnesota | 2
4 | Creighton | 0

Second round
UCLA | 14
Creighton | 0
Cal State Northridge | 0
Minnesota | 2
Alabama | 0
Missouri | 1

Third round
UCLA | 5
Minnesota | 0
Cal State Northridge | 1
Missouri | 3

Semifinals
Minnesota | 0
Missouri | 3

Final
UCLA | 12 | —
Missouri | 5 | —

UCLA qualifies for WCWS

=== Regional No. 2 ===
Host: Arizona
Tucson, Arizona

First round
1 | Arizona | 9^{5}
6 | East Carolina | 1
2 | Kansas | 5
5 | Southeast Missouri State | 1
3 | Maryland | 5
4 | Texas State | 0

Second round
Arizona | 8
Texas State | 0
Kansas | 0
Maryland | 1
East Carolina | 1
Southeast Missouri State | 2

Third round
Arizona | 3
Maryland | 7
Kansas | 3
Southeast Missouri State | 1

Semifinals
Arizona | 6
Kansas | 1

Final
Maryland | 1 | 0
Arizona | 10^{5} | 8^{5}

Arizona qualifies for WCWS

=== Regional No. 3 ===
Host: Washington
Seattle, Washington

First round
1 | Washington | 8^{6}
6 | Colgate | 0
2 | Texas A&M | 4
5 | Hawaii | 3
3 | Cal State Fullerton | 12^{5}
4 | Tennessee | 0

Second round
Washington | 12^{5}
Tennessee | 1
Texas A&M | 1
Cal State Fullerton | 2
Colgate | 2
Hawaii | 7

Third round
Washington | 1
Cal State Fullerton | 0
Texas A&M | 3
Hawaii | 8

Semifinals
Cal State Fullerton | 3
Hawaii | 4^{11}

Final
Washington | 3 | —
Hawaii | 0 | —

Washington qualifies for WCWS

=== Regional No. 4 ===
Host: Fresno State
Fresno, California

First round
1 | Fresno State | 5
6 | Florida A&M | 0
2 | Texas Tech | 1
5 | South Carolina | 0
3 | Pacific | 6^{8}
4 | Stanford | 5

Second round
Fresno State | 5
Stanford | 2
Texas Tech | 1
Pacific | 0
South Carolina | 2
Florida A&M | 0

Third round
Fresno State | 3
Texas Tech | 1
Pacific | 1
South Carolina | 2^{12}

Semifinals
Texas Tech | 4
South Carolina | 1

Final
Fresno State | 5 | —
Texas Tech | 0 | —

Fresno State qualifies for WCWS

=== Regional No. 5 ===
Host: LSU
Baton Rouge, Louisiana

First round
1 | LSU | 12^{5}
6 | Southern | 0
2 | Oklahoma | 3
5 | Long Beach State | 1
3 | Southern Miss | 1
4 | Oregon State | 0

Second round
LSU | 0
Oregon State | 3
Southern | 0
Long Beach State | 8^{5}
Oklahoma | 0
Southern Miss | 5
LSU | 7
Oklahoma | 3

Third round
Oregon State | 3
Long Beach State | 0
Southern Miss | 4
LSU | 3

Final
Oregon State | 9^{6} | 0
Southern Miss | 1 | 4

Southern Miss qualifies for WCWS.

=== Regional No. 6 ===
Host: Michigan
Ann Arbor, Michigan

First round
1 | Florida Atlantic | 2
6 | Michigan | 0
2 | Nebraska | 2
5 | Notre Dame | 0
3 | Arizona State | 2^{9}
4 | Central Michigan | 1

Second round
Florida Atlantic | 8
Central Michigan | 3
Nebraska | 0
Arizona State | 1
Michigan | 0
Notre Dame | 1

Third round
Florida Atlantic | 1
Arizona State | 2
Nebraska | 4^{8}
Notre Dame | 3

Semifinals
Florida Atlantic | 2
Nebraska | 4

Final
Arizona State | 1 | 4
Nebraska | 2^{8} | 2

Arizona State qualifies for WCWS.

=== Regional No. 7 ===
Host: UMass
Amherst, Massathusetts

First round
1 | Southwestern Louisiana | 15^{5}
6 | Manhattan | 0
2 | UMass | 3
5 | LIU Brooklyn | 2
3 | California | 5
4 | Hofstra | 4

Second round
Southwestern Louisiana | 5
Hofstra | 1
UMass | 0
California | 1
Manhattan | 3
LIU Brooklyn | 4^{8}

Third round
Southwestern Louisiana | 2
California | 1
UMass | 3
LIU Brooklyn | 0

Semifinals
California | 2^{8}
UMass | 0

Final
Southwestern Louisiana | 0 | 3
California | 3 | 8

California qualifies for WCWS.

=== Regional No. 8 ===
Host: DePaul (games played at Illinois-Chicago)
Chicago, illinois

First round
1 | Texas | 8^{6}
6 | Cornell | 0
2 | DePaul | 4
5 | Michigan State | 1
3 | UIC | 1
4 | Oregon | 0

Second round
Texas | 0
Oregon | 6
Michigan State | 9
Cornell | 1
DePaul | 4
UIC | 0
UIC | 4
Texas | 1

Third round
Oregon | 1
Michigan State | 9^{6}
DePaul | 5
UIC | 1

Final
Michigan State | 0 | —
DePaul | 2 | —

DePaul qualifies for WCWS.

== Women's College World Series ==
=== Participants ===
- Arizona
- Arizona State
- California
- DePaul
- Fresno State
- Southern Miss
- UCLA
- Washington

=== Results ===
==== Bracket ====
Round of 16
UCLA | 3^{9}
DePaul | 2
Fresno State | 1
Southern Miss | 0
DePaul | 1
Southern Miss | 0
Washington | 4
Arizona State | 1
Arizona | 3
California | 0
Arizona State | 0
California | 2

Quarterfinals
UCLA | 1
Fresno State | 0
Arizona | 0
DePaul | 1
Washington | 3
Arizona | 0
Fresno State | 0
California | 1

Semifinals
UCLA | 2^{8} | —
DePaul | 1 | —
Washington | 3 | —
California | 0 | —

Finals
UCLA | 3
Washington | 2

=== Championship Game ===
| School | Top Batter | Stats. |
|---|---|---|
| UCLA Bruins | Julie Adams (3B) | 2-3 2RBIs |
| Washington Huskies | Erin Helgeland (CF) | 1-3 RBI |

| School | Pitcher | IP | H | R | ER | BB | SO | AB | BF |
|---|---|---|---|---|---|---|---|---|---|
| UCLA Bruins | Courtney Dale (W) | 4.0 | 3 | 1 | 1 | 2 | 3 | 13 | 19 |
| UCLA Bruins | Amanda Freed (SV) | 3.0 | 2 | 1 | 1 | 1 | 2 | 11 | 12 |
| Washington Huskies | Jennifer Spediacci (L) | 6.0 | 7 | 3 | 3 | 0 | 6 | 26 | 26 |
| Washington Huskies | Jamie Graves | 1.0 | 1 | 0 | 0 | 0 | 0 | 3 | 4 |

=== All-Tournament Team ===
The following players were members of the All-Tournament Team.

| Position | Player | School |
|---|---|---|
| P | Courtney Dale | UCLA |
| P | Amanda Freed | UCLA |
| P | Amanda Scott | Fresno State |
| P | Jennifer Spediacci | Washington |
| C | Katy Carter | DePaul |
| 1B | Melissa Downs | Washington |
| 2B | Lisa Iancin | California |
| 2B | Lovieanne Jung | Fresno State |
| 3B | Julie Adams | UCLA |
| 3B | Kim DePaul | Washington |
| 3B | Julie Luna | DePaul |
| OF | Christie Ambrosi | UCLA |

== See also ==
- 1999 NCAA Division II softball tournament
- 1999 NCAA Division III softball tournament
- 1999 NAIA softball tournament
- 1999 NCAA Division I baseball tournament
