= Husky Softball Stadium =

Softball stadium on the University of Washington campus in Seattle, WA

- Interactive map of Husky Softball Stadium
- Location: Adjacent to and east of Husky Stadium, Seattle, Washington
- Coordinates: 47°39′2.4″N 122°17′59.9″W
- Owner: University of Washington
- Operator: University of Washington
- Seating type: Chairback seats Bleacher seats
- Capacity: 1,500
- Surface: Grass
- Scoreboard: Electronic
- Field size: Left Field: 198 ft. Center Field: 215 ft. Right Field: 198 ft. (estimated)

Construction
- Opened: April 8, 1994
- Cost: $4 million in two phases
- Architects: Loschky, Marquardt and Nesholm

Tenant
- Washington Huskies softball (NCAA) (1994-Present)

Husky Softball Stadium is the home stadium for the Division I (NCAA) Washington Huskies softball team. Located next to Husky Stadium on the campus of University of Washington, the stadium features seating for 1,500 fans. Included in the 1,500 seat capacity is a combination of chair back, theatre, and bleacher seating. The main stands consist of 200 theatre-style seats and 800 bench seats. An additional 500 can be seated when bleachers are added around the stadium perimeter. Overflow viewing is available from the concourses at adjacent Husky Stadium.

== Construction ==
The stadium was built in two main phases. Phase One was completed in 1993. Phase Two began in 1995 and was completed in 1996. The stadium has field lighting, dugouts, a press box, two batting cages along the left field line, and an electronic scoreboard. Also included are coaches offices, locker rooms, training rooms, concessions, a conference room, and restrooms. The stadium was built with materials similar to those used in other campus athletics facilities.

The initial home game was played in April 8, 1994 against Willamette.

== Post-season play ==
NCAA regional softball tournaments were held at the stadium in 1996, 1998, 1999, 2000, 2007, and 2023.
