= List of Cal State Fullerton Titans softball seasons =

This is a list of Cal State Fullerton Titans softball seasons. The Cal State Fullerton Titans softball program is a college softball team that represents the California State University, Fullerton in the Big West Conference of the National Collegiate Athletic Association.

The Titans have won 18 conference championships and appeared in the NCAA Division I softball tournament 30 times, advancing to the Women's College World Series six times and winning the 1986 National Championship. The Titans also appeared in two Women's College World Series while the AIAW sponsored the event.

== Season results ==
National champions	Women's College World Series berth	NCAA Tournament berth	Conference champions

Season	Head coach	Conference	Season results									Postseason result
Season	Head coach	Conference	Overall				Conference					Postseason result
Season	Head coach	Conference	Wins	Losses	Ties	%	Wins	Losses	Ties	%	Finish	Postseason result
Cal State Fullerton Titans
1980	Judi Garman	WCAA	30	27	0	.526	9	7	0	.563	3rd	Women's College World Series
1981	Judi Garman	WCAA	51	14	0	.785	21	3	0	.875	1st	Women's College World Series
1982	Judi Garman	WCAA	55	6	2	.889	17	3	0	.850	1st	Women's College World Series
1983	Judi Garman	WCAA	56	15	0	.789	17	3	0	.850	1st	Women's College World Series
1984	Judi Garman	WCAA	54	12	0	.818	9	3	0	.750	1st	NCAA Tournament
1985	Judi Garman	WCAA	54	10	0	.844	12	0	0	1.000	1st	Women's College World Series
1986	Judi Garman	Big West	57	9	1	.858	22	5	1	.804	1st	National Champions
1987	Judi Garman	Big West	59	10	0	.855	31	5	0	.861	T-1st	Women's College World Series
1988	Judi Garman	Big West	52	20	0	.722	24	10	0	.706	3rd	NCAA Tournament
1989	Judi Garman	Big West	47	15	0	.758	28	8	0	.778	2nd	NCAA Tournament
1990	Judi Garman	Big West	45	23	0	.662	22	13	0	.629	3rd	NCAA Tournament
1991	Judi Garman	Big West	52	16	1	.761	25	9	1	.729	3rd	NCAA Tournament
1992	Judi Garman	Big West	45	20	0	.692	25	11	0	.694	2nd	NCAA Tournament
1993	Judi Garman	Big West	37	21	0	.638	25	7	0	.781	T-1st	NCAA Tournament
1994	Judi Garman	Big West	35	29	0	.547	21	11	0	.656	3rd	NCAA Tournament
1995	Judi Garman	Big West	46	17	0	.730	20	8	0	.714	2nd	Women's College World Series
1996	Judi Garman	Big West	41	28	0	.594	17	15	0	.531	4th	NCAA Tournament
1997	Judi Garman	Big West	29	26	0	.527	13	19	0	.406	7th	—
1998	Judi Garman	Big West	32	29	0	.525	16	16	0	.500	4th	—
1999	Judi Garman	Big West	36	29	0	.554	13	11	0	.542	4th	NCAA Tournament
2000	Michelle Gromacki	Big West	45	15	0	.750	19	5	0	.792	1st	NCAA Tournament
2001	Michelle Gromacki	Big West	48	14	0	.774	19	2	0	.905	1st	NCAA Tournament
2002	Michelle Gromacki	Big West	53	13	0	.803	22	2	0	.917	1st	NCAA Tournament
2003	Michelle Gromacki	Big West	41	15	0	.732	20	1	0	.952	1st	NCAA Tournament
2004	Michelle Gromacki	Big West	18	34	0	.346	7	14	0	.333	6th	—
2005	Michelle Gromacki	Big West	30	21	0	.588	14	7	0	.667	3rd	NCAA Tournament
2006	Michelle Gromacki	Big West	37	27	0	.578	14	4	0	.778	1st	NCAA Tournament
2007	Michelle Gromacki	Big West	28	23	0	.549	13	5	0	.722	2nd	NCAA Tournament
2008	Michelle Gromacki	Big West	27	28	1	.491	11	10	0	.524	5th	NCAA Tournament
2009	Michelle Gromacki	Big West	30	21	0	.588	17	4	0	.810	2nd	NCAA Tournament
2010	Michelle Gromacki	Big West	14	39	0	.264	9	12	0	.429	6th	—
2011	Michelle Gromacki	Big West	23	24	0	.489	12	9	0	.571	3rd	—
2012	Michelle Gromacki	Big West	20	31	0	.392	8	13	0	.381	6th	—
2013	Kelly Ford	Big West	28	28	0	.500	13	11	0	.542	3rd	—
2014	Kelly Ford	Big West	33	21	1	.609	22	13	0	.629	4th	—
2015	Kelly Ford	Big West	34	22	0	.607	12	9	0	.571	4th	—
2016	Kelly Ford	Big West	45	16	0	.738	17	4	0	.810	1st	NCAA Tournament
2017	Kelly Ford	Big West	35	23	0	.603	16	5	0	.762	1st	NCAA Tournament
2018	Kelly Ford	Big West	35	25	0	.583	18	3	0	.857	1st	NCAA Tournament
2019	Kelly Ford	Big West	38	18	0	.679	18	3	0	.857	1st	NCAA Tournament
2020	Kelly Ford	Big West	14	10	0	.583	Season canceled due to COVID-19 pandemic					
2021	Kelly Ford	Big West	38	15	0	.717	21	3	0	.875	2nd	—
2022	Kelly Ford	Big West	37	22	0	.627	20	7	0	.741	1st	NCAA Tournament
2023	Kelly Ford	Big West	34	21	0	.618	20	7	0	.741	2nd	NCAA Tournament
2024	Kelly Ford	Big West	39	19	0	.672	22	5	0	.815	1st	NCAA Tournament
2025	Gina Oaks Garcia	Big West	37	17	0	.685	22	5	0	.815	1st	—
2026	Gina Oaks Garcia	Big West	41	15	0	.732	24	3	0	.889	1st	NCAA Tournament
