= 1990 NCAA Division I softball season =

American college softball season

- Defending Champions: UCLA

Tournament

Women's College World Series
- Duration: May 23–27, 1990
- Champions: UCLA (6th (7th overall) title)
- Runners-up: Fresno State (6th WCWS Appearance)
- Winning Coach: Sharron Backus & Sue Enquist (6th (7th overall) & 2nd title)

Seasons
- ← 1989 1991 →

The 1990 NCAA Division I softball season, play of college softball in the United States organized by the National Collegiate Athletic Association (NCAA) at the Division I level, began in February 1990. The season progressed through the regular season, many conference tournaments and championship series, and concluded with the 1990 NCAA Division I softball tournament and 1990 Women's College World Series. The Women's College World Series, consisting of the eight remaining teams in the NCAA Tournament and held in Oklahoma City at ASA Hall of Fame Stadium, ended on May 27, 1990.

== Conference standings ==
1990 Big Ten Conference softball standings
	Conf.						Overall
Team	W		L		T	PCT	W		L		T	PCT
Ohio State ‍†‍‍^{y}	17	–	7	–	0	.708	39	–	25	–	0	.609
Iowa ‍†‍‍	17	–	7	–	0	.708	43	–	28	–	0	.606
Indiana ‍‍‍	16	–	8	–	0	.667	45	–	18	–	0	.714
Michigan ‍‍‍	12	–	12	–	0	.500	29	–	27	–	0	.518
Minnesota ‍‍‍	12	–	12	–	0	.500	31	–	32	–	0	.492
Northwestern ‍‍‍	5	–	19	–	0	.208	16	–	35	–	0	.314
Michigan State ‍‍‍	5	–	19	–	0	.208	9	–	45	–	0	.167
† – Conference champion y – Invited to the NCAA tournament

1990 Pacific-10 Conference softball standings
	Conf.				Overall
Team	W		L	PCT	W		L	PCT
UCLA ‍†‍‍^{y}	16	–	2	.889	62	–	7	.899
Arizona ‍‍‍^{y}	12	–	6	.667	49	–	17	.742
Oregon ‍‍‍^{y}	9	–	9	.500	35	–	23	.603
California ‍‍‍^{y}	9	–	9	.500	41	–	28	.594
Arizona State ‍‍‍^{y}	10	–	10	.500	43	–	32	.573
Oregon State ‍‍‍	0	–	18	.000	6	–	40	.130
† – Conference champion y – Invited to the NCAA tournament

1990 Pacific Coast Athletic Association softball standings
	Conf.				Overall
Team	W		L	PCT	W		L	PCT
Fresno State ‍†‍‍^{y}	29	–	7	.806	62	–	15	.805
Long Beach State ‍‍‍^{y}	28	–	8	.778	48	–	19	.716
Cal State Fullerton ‍‍‍^{y}	22	–	13	.629	45	–	23	.662
UNLV ‍‍‍^{y}	21	–	15	.583	41	–	27	.603
San Jose State ‍‍‍^{y}	18	–	18	.500	34	–	28	.548
Cal Poly Pomona ‍‍‍	16	–	20	.444	34	–	32	.515
Pacific ‍‍‍	15	–	21	.417	30	–	28	.517
San Diego State ‍‍‍	11	–	24	.314	21	–	38	.356
UC Santa Barbara ‍‍‍	11	–	25	.306	23	–	34	.404
Hawaii ‍‍‍	8	–	28	.222	24	–	41	.369
† – Conference champion y – Invited to the NCAA tournament

1990 Southland Conference softball standings
	Conf.						Overall
Team	W		L		T	PCT	W		L		T	PCT
Sam Houston State ‍†‍‍	9	–	3	–	0	.750	25	–	32	–	0	.439
Texas–Arlington ‍‍‍	7	–	3	–	0	.700	27	–	24	–	0	.529
Northwestern Louisiana ‍‍‍	8	–	4	–	0	.667	43	–	17	–	0	.717
Stephen F. Austin ‍‍‡‍	6	–	4	–	0	.600	25	–	20	–	0	.556
Northeast Louisiana ‍‍‍	5	–	7	–	0	.417	19	–	47	–	0	.288
Southwest Texas State ‍‍‍	4	–	8	–	0	.333	7	–	37	–	0	.159
McNeese State ‍‍‍	2	–	13	–	0	.133	10	–	38	–	0	.208
† – Conference champion ‡ – Tournament champion y – Invited to the NCAA tournament

== Women's College World Series ==
The 1990 NCAA Women's College World Series took place from May 23 to May 27, 1990, in Oklahoma City.

Upper round 1
UCLA	4
Kent State	0
Long Beach State	2
UNLV	0
Oklahoma State	3
Arizona	0
Florida State	1
Fresno State	0

Upper round 2
UCLA	6
Long Beach State	0
Oklahoma State	4
Florida State	1
Lower round 1
UNLV	5
Kent State	2
Fresno State	1
Arizona	0

Upper final
UCLA	2
Oklahoma State	1
Lower round 2
Florida State	4
UNLV	1
Long Beach State	0
Fresno State	2

Semifinals
UCLA	3
Florida State	0
Oklahoma State	0
Fresno State	1^{10}

Final
UCLA	0	17
Fresno State	2	0

== Season leaders ==
Batting

- Batting average: .483 – Meg Thompson, Canisius Golden Griffins
- RBIs: 57 – Rhonda King-Randolph, Toledo Rockets
- Home runs: 13 – Rhonda King-Randolph, Toledo Rockets

Pitching

- WINS: 34-17 – Lisa Kemme, Winthrop Eagles
- ERA: 0.27 (7 ER/181.0 IP) - Sue Rybczyk, UConn Huskies
- Strikeouts: 327, Michele Granger, California Golden Bears

== Records ==
Freshman class scoreless innings streak: 63.0 – Heather Compton, UCLA Bruins; March 2-May 9, 1990

Sophomore class single game triples: 3 – Michelle Shean, Oklahoma State Cowgirls; March 10, 1990

Senior class assists: 222 – Tiffany Cornelius, San Jose State Spartans

== Awards ==
- Honda Sports Award Softball:

Lisa Fernandez, UCLA

YEAR	W	L	GP	GS	CG	SHO	SV	IP	H	R	ER	BB	SO	ERA	WHIP
1990	11	1	15	12	12	8	0	83.0	33	6	3	10	51	0.25	0.52

YEAR	G	AB	R	H	BA	RBI	HR	3B	2B	TB	SLG	BB	SO	SB	SBA
1990	67	213	27	66	.310	22	1	2	7	80	.375%	12	6	1	1

== All America Teams ==
The following players were members of the All-American Teams.

First Team

Position	Player	Class	School
P	Lisa Longaker	SR.	UCLA Bruins
P	Stefni Whitton	SR.	Southwestern Louisiana Ragin' Cajuns
P	Michele Granger	FR.	California Golden Bears
C	Diane Pohl	SO.	Iowa Hawkeyes
1B	Rhonda King-Randolph	SR.	Toledo Rockets
2B	Julie Smith	JR.	Fresno State Bulldogs
3B	Camille Spitaleri	SO.	Kansas Jayhawks
SS	Martha Noffsinger	SR.	Fresno State Bulldogs
OF	Yvonne Gutierrez	SO.	UCLA Bruins
OF	Vivian Holm	SR.	Arizona Wildcats
OF	Charmelle Green	JR.	Utah Utes
UT	Lisa Fernandez	FR.	UCLA Bruins
AT-L	Michelle Delloso	JR.	South Carolina Gamecocks

Second Team

Position	Player	Class	School
P	Carie Dever	SR.	Fresno State Bulldogs
P	Ann Van Dortrecht	SO.	Cal State Fullerton Titans
P	Mary Letourneau	FR.	Long Beach State 49ers
C	Shelly Stokes	SR.	Fresno State Bulldogs
1B	Julie Cavanaugh	SO.	Oregon Ducks
2B	Tricia Reimche	JR.	UNLV Rebels
3B	Joy Tiner	JR.	Cal State Fullerton Titans
SS	Vicki Bartolucci	SR.	UConn Huskies
OF	Pauline Maurice	JR.	Kent State Golden Flashes
OF	Tricia Popowski	JR.	South Carolina Gamecocks
OF	Pam Stanley	SO.	Central Michigan Chippewas
UT	Julie Jones	JR.	Arizona Wildcats
AT-L	Kim Braatz	JR.	New Mexico Lobos
AT-L	Ann Rowman	JR.	Arizona State Sun Devils

Third Team

Position	Player	Class	School
P	Debbie Nichols	SR.	Louisiana Tech Lady Techsters
P	Darby Degrist	SO.	Kent State Golden Flashes
P	Sue Rybczyk	SR.	UConn Huskies
C	Margie Ledgerwood	SR.	Indiana Hoosiers
1B	Tracy Van Kannon	JR.	New Mexico Lobos
2B	Beth Bull	JR.	Central Michigan Chippewas
3B	Nicki Dennis	SR.	Arizona Wildcats
SS	Chris Parris	JR.	UNLV Rebels
OF	Michelle Shean	SO.	Oklahoma State Cowgirls
OF	Sharon Cafini	SR.	San Jose State Spartans
OF	Christi Cammarata	SR.	Indiana Hoosiers
UT	Gina LoPiccolo	JR.	Fresno State Bulldogs
AT-L	Dena Carter	JR.	Oklahoma State Cowgirls
