= 1989 Arizona Wildcats softball team =

American college softball season

1989 Arizona Wildcats softball

NCAA Regional champion

Women's College World Series, T-3rd
- Conference: Pacific-10 Conference
- Record: 48–19 (11–9 Pac-10)
- Head coach: Mike Candrea (4th season)

1989 Pacific-10 Conference softball standings
	Conf.				Overall
Team	W		L	PCT	W		L	PCT
UCLA ‍†‍‍^{y}	18	–	2	.900	48	–	4	.923
Oregon ‍‍‍^{y}	13	–	7	.650	54	–	18	.750
Arizona ‍‍‍^{y}	11	–	9	.550	48	–	19	.716
California ‍‍‍^{y}	10	–	10	.500	38	–	26	.594
Arizona State ‍‍‍^{y}	7	–	13	.350	34	–	26	.567
Oregon State ‍‍‍	1	–	19	.050	7	–	30	.189
† – Conference champion y – Invited to the NCAA tournament

The 1989 Arizona Wildcats softball team represented the University of Arizona in the 1989 NCAA Division I softball season. The Wildcats were coached by Mike Candrea, who led his fourth season. The Wildcats finished with a record of 48–19. They competed in the Pacific-10 Conference, where they finished third with an 11–9 record.

The Wildcats were invited to the 1989 NCAA Division I softball tournament, where they won the Regional and advanced to their second Women's College World Series. Arizona finished tied for third place with wins over eventual runner-up Fresno State and Oregon Ducks and losses to eventual champion UCLA and fellow semifinalist Oklahoma State.

== Personnel ==
=== Roster ===
1989 Arizona Wildcats roster
Pitchers: 2 - Lisa Bautista - Senior; 14 - Ginnie Scheller - Junior; 17 - Doreen Juarez - Freshman; Catchers: 8 - Heidi Halbwachs - Sophomore; 12 - Stacy Engel - Senior; 15 - Jody Miller - Freshman	Infielders: 4 - Julie Standering - Sophomore; 6 - Vivian Holm - Junior; 13 - Stephanie Salcido - Freshman; 20 - Nicki Dennis - Junior; 22 - Suzie Lady - Sophomore	Outfielders: 7 - Kristen Gauthier - Sophomore; 10 - Trish Boutin - Junior; 11 - Julie Jones - Sophomore; 23 - Stacy Redondo - Freshman

=== Coaches ===
1989 Arizona Wildcats softball coaching staff
- Mike Candrea - Head coach - 4th season
- Larry Ray - Assistant coach - 4th season

== Schedule ==
Legend
	Arizona win
	Arizona loss
*	Non-Conference game

1989 Arizona Wildcats softball game log
Regular season

February
Date	Opponent	Site/stadium	Score	Overall record	Pac-10 record
Feb 14	Oregon	UA Softball Field • Tucson, AZ	L 3–5	0–1	0–1
Feb 14	Oregon	UA Softball Field • Tucson, AZ	L 1–2	0–2	0–2
Feb 16	Toledo*	UA Softball Field • Tucson, AZ (Arizona Classic)	L 1–4	0–3	
Feb 16	Nebraska*	UA Softball Field • Tucson, AZ (Arizona Classic)	W 7–0	1–3	
Feb 17	Cal State Fullerton*	UA Softball Field • Tucson, AZ (Arizona Classic)	L 1–3	1–4	
Feb 17	US International*	UA Softball Field • Tucson, AZ (Arizona Classic)	W 4–0	2–4	
Feb 17	Northwestern*	UA Softball Field • Tucson, AZ (Arizona Classic)	W 3–2	3–4	
Feb 18	Hawaii*	UA Softball Field • Tucson, AZ (Arizona Classic)	W 5–0	4–4	
Feb 19	Northwestern*	UA Softball Field • Tucson, AZ (Arizona Classic)	W 3–0	5–4	
Feb 19	Long Beach State*	UA Softball Field • Tucson, AZ (Arizona Classic)	W 4–3	6–4	
Feb 19	Oregon*	UA Softball Field • Tucson, AZ (Arizona Classic)	L 3–5	6–5	
Feb 22	vs Utah State*	Sun Devil Club Stadium • Tempe, AZ	L 1–2	6–6	
Feb 22	vs Cal Poly Pomona*	Sun Devil Club Stadium • Tempe, AZ	W 6–2	7–6	
Feb 27	Penn State*	UA Softball Field • Tucson, AZ	W 10–3	8–6	
Feb 27	Penn State*	UA Softball Field • Tucson, AZ	W 4–0	9–6	

March
Date	Opponent	Site/stadium	Score	Overall record	Pac-10 record
Mar 2	vs Wichita State*	NM State Softball Complex • Las Cruces, NM (Roadrunner Invitational)	W 5–0	10–6	
Mar 2	vs Nebraska*	NM State Softball Complex • Las Cruces, NM (Roadrunner Invitational)	W 3–1	11–6	
Mar 2	vs New Mexico*	NM State Softball Complex • Las Cruces, NM (Roadrunner Invitational)	W 1–0	12–6	
Mar 3	vs Michigan*	NM State Softball Complex • Las Cruces, NM (Roadrunner Invitational)	W 3–1	13–6	
Mar 3	vs Oklahoma State*	NM State Softball Complex • Las Cruces, NM (Roadrunner Invitational)	L 0–10	13–7	
Mar 3	vs Nicholls State*	NM State Softball Complex • Las Cruces, NM (Roadrunner Invitational)	W 8–2	14–7	
Mar 4	vs Northeast Louisiana*	NM State Softball Complex • Las Cruces, NM (Roadrunner Invitational)	W 11–3	15–7	
Mar 11	at UCLA	Sunset Field • Los Angeles, CA	L 1–2	15–8	0–3
Mar 11	at UCLA	Sunset Field • Los Angeles	L 2–6	15–9	0–4
Mar 17	vs Central Michigan*	Twin Creeks Sports Complex • Sunnyvale, CA (National Invitational Tournament)	W 4–0	16–9	
Mar 17	vs San Jose State*	Twin Creeks Sports Complex • Sunnyvale, CA (National Invitational Tournament)	W 4–1	17–9	
Mar 17	vs Kansas*	Twin Creeks Sports Complex • Sunnyvale, CA (National Invitational Tournament)	W 1–0	18–9	
Mar 18	vs UMass*	Twin Creeks Sports Complex • Sunnyvale, CA (National Invitational Tournament)	W 4–0	19–9	
Mar 18	vs Arizona State*	Twin Creeks Sports Complex • Sunnyvale, CA (National Invitational Tournament)	W 1–0	20–9	
Mar 19	vs Michigan*	Twin Creeks Sports Complex • Sunnyvale, CA (National Invitational Tournament)	L 0–1	20–10	
Mar 23	vs US International*	Anderson Family Field • Fullerton, CA (Judi Garman Classic)	W 5–4	21–10	
Mar 23	vs Long Beach State*	Anderson Family Field • Fullerton, CA (Judi Garman Classic)	W 1–0	22–10	
Mar 24	vs Oklahoma State*	Anderson Family Field • Fullerton, CA (Judi Garman Classic)	L 1–2	22–12	
Mar 24	vs Oregon*	Anderson Family Field • Fullerton, CA (Judi Garman Classic)	W 3–2	23–11	
Mar 26	vs Cal State Fullerton*	Anderson Family Field • Fullerton, CA (Judi Garman Classic)	W 4–1	24–11	
Mar 26	vs Long Beach State*	Anderson Family Field • Fullerton, CA (Judi Garman Classic)	W 1–0	25–11	
Mar 26	vs Oklahoma State*	Anderson Family Field • Fullerton, CA (Judi Garman Classic)	W 3–4	26–11	
Mar 29	at Arizona State	Sun Devil Club Stadium • Tempe, AZ	L 0–1	26–12	0–5
Mar 29	at Arizona State	Sun Devil Club Stadium • Tempe, AZ	L 3–0	26–13	1–5

April
Date	Opponent	Site/stadium	Score	Overall record	Pac-10 record
Apr 1	Oregon State	UA Softball Field • Tucson, AZ	W 2–0	27–13	2–5
Apr 1	Oregon State	UA Softball Field • Tucson, AZ	W 3–0	28–13	3–5
Apr 14	at Oregon State	Corvallis, OR	W 9–0	29–13	4–5
Apr 14	at Oregon State	Corvallis, OR	L 0–1	29–14	4–6
Apr 15	at Oregon	Howe Field • Eugene, OR	L 3–4	29–15	4–7
Apr 15	at Oregon	Howe Field • Eugene, OR	W 3–0	30–15	5–7
Apr 19	Arizona State	UA Softball Field • Tucson, AZ	L 3–6	30–16	5–8
Apr 19	Arizona State	UA Softball Field • Tucson, AZ	W 4–0	31–16	6–8
Apr 22	UCLA	UA Softball Field • Tucson, AZ	L 2–4	31–17	6–9
Apr 22	UCLA	UA Softball Field • Tucson, AZ	W 2–1	32–17	7–9
Apr 23	California	UA Softball Field • Tucson, AZ	W 1–0	33–17	8–9
Apr 23	California	UA Softball Field • Tucson, AZ	W 3–2	34–17	9–9
Apr 27	vs Colorado State*	Logan, UT (Utah/Utah State Classic)	W 4–0	35–17	
Apr 27	vs Utah State*	Logan, UT (Utah/Utah State Classic)	W 4–0	36–17	
Apr 28	vs Utah*	Logan, UT (Utah/Utah State Classic)	W 5–4	37–17	
Apr 28	vs Ohio State*	Logan, UT (Utah/Utah State Classic)	W 2–0	38–17	
Apr 29	vs Colorado State*	Logan, UT (Utah/Utah State Classic)	W 4–1	39–17	
Apr 29	vs Southern Utah*	Logan, UT (Utah/Utah State Classic)	W 2–0	40–17	
Apr 29	vs Utah*	Logan, UT (Utah/Utah State Classic)	W 4–3	41–17	
May 6	at California	Strawberry Field • Berkeley, CA	W 3–2	42–17	10–9
May 6	at California	Strawberry Field • Berkeley, CA	W 1–0	43–17	11–9

Postseason

NCAA Regional
Date	Opponent	Site/stadium	Score	Overall record	NCAAT record
May 19	Utah State	Sun Devil Club Stadium • Tempe, AZ	W 8–3	44–17	1–0
May 19	Arizona State	Sun Devil Club Stadium • Tempe, AZ	W 3–2	45–17	2–0
May 20	Arizona State	Sun Devil Club Stadium • Tempe, AZ	W 4–0	46–17	3–0

NCAA Women's College World Series
Date	Opponent	Site/stadium	Score	Overall record	WCWS Record
May 25	Fresno State	Twin Creeks Sports Complex • Sunnyvale, CA	W 12–0	47–17	1–0
May 26	Oklahoma State	Twin Creeks Sports Complex • Sunnyvale, CA	L 0–4	47–18	1–1
May 27	Oregon	Twin Creeks Sports Complex • Sunnyvale, CA	W 4–0	48–18	2–1
May 27	UCLA	Twin Creeks Sports Complex • Sunnyvale, CA	L 0–3	48–19	2–2
