= 1986 NCAA Division I softball season =

American college softball season

- Defending Champions: UCLA

Tournament

Women's College World Series
- Champions: Cal State Fullerton (1st title)
- Runners-up: Texas A&M (3rd WCWS Appearance)
- Winning Coach: Judi Garman (1st title)

Seasons
- ← 1985 1987 →

The 1986 NCAA Division I softball season, play of college softball in the United States organized by the National Collegiate Athletic Association (NCAA) at the Division I level, began in February 1986. The season progressed through the regular season, many conference tournaments and championship series, and concluded with the 1986 NCAA Division I softball tournament and 1986 Women's College World Series. The Women's College World Series, consisting of the eight remaining teams in the NCAA Tournament and held in Omaha, Nebraska at Seymour Smith Park, ended on May 25, 1986.

== Conference standings ==
1986 Big Ten Conference softball standings
| | Conf. | | | | | | Overall |
| Team | W | | L | | T | PCT | W | | L | | T | PCT |
|---|---|---|---|---|---|---|---|---|---|---|---|---|
| Indiana ‍†‍‍^{y} | 15 | – | 9 | – | 0 | .625 | 45 | – | 18 | – | 0 | .714 |
| Northwestern ‍†‍‍^{y} | 15 | – | 9 | – | 0 | .625 | 33 | – | 17 | – | 0 | .660 |
| Minnesota ‍†‍‍ | 15 | – | 9 | – | 0 | .625 | 28 | – | 23 | – | 0 | .549 |
| Michigan State ‍‍‍ | 14 | – | 10 | – | 0 | .583 | 29 | – | 20 | – | 0 | .592 |
| Michigan ‍‍‍ | 12 | – | 12 | – | 0 | .500 | 32 | – | 17 | – | 0 | .653 |
| Iowa ‍‍‍ | 10 | – | 14 | – | 0 | .417 | 26 | – | 19 | – | 0 | .578 |
| Ohio State ‍‍‍ | 3 | – | 21 | – | 0 | .125 | 12 | – | 33 | – | 1 | .272 |
† – Conference champion y – Invited to the NCAA tournament Rankings from Coaches' Poll

1986 Pacific Coast Athletic Association softball standings
| | Conf. | | | | | | Overall |
| Team | W | | L | | T | PCT | W | | L | | T | PCT |
|---|---|---|---|---|---|---|---|---|---|---|---|---|
| Cal State Fullerton ‍†‍‍^{y} | 22 | – | 5 | – | 1 | .804 | 57 | – | 9 | – | 1 | .858 |
| Long Beach State ‍‍‍^{y} | 18 | – | 9 | – | 0 | .667 | 39 | – | 18 | – | 0 | .684 |
| Cal Poly Pomona ‍‍‍^{y} | 18 | – | 9 | – | 1 | .661 | 36 | – | 19 | – | 1 | .652 |
| Pacific ‍‍‍^{y} | 17 | – | 10 | – | 0 | .630 | 34 | – | 18 | – | 1 | .651 |
| UC Santa Barbara ‍‍‍ | 11 | – | 17 | – | 0 | .393 | 20 | – | 30 | – | 0 | .400 |
| UNLV ‍‍‍ | 10 | – | 17 | – | 0 | .370 | 18 | – | 32 | – | 0 | .360 |
| San Diego State ‍‍‍ | 6 | – | 21 | – | 0 | .222 | 22 | – | 36 | – | 0 | .379 |
| Hawaii ‍‍‍ | 7 | – | 21 | – | 0 | .250 | 9 | – | 27 | – | 0 | .250 |
† – Conference champion y – Invited to the NCAA tournament

1986 Southland Conference softball standings
| | Conf. | | | | Overall |
| Team | W | | L | PCT | W | | L | PCT |
|---|---|---|---|---|---|---|---|---|
| Southwestern Louisiana ‍†‍‍ | 10 | – | 2 | .833 | 30 | – | 19 | .612 |
| Texas–Arlington ‍‍‍ | 10 | – | 2 | .833 | 25 | – | 25 | .500 |
| Lamar ‍‍‍ | 8 | – | 4 | .667 | 16 | – | 19 | .457 |
| McNeese State ‍‍‍ | 6 | – | 6 | .500 | 19 | – | 24 | .442 |
| North Texas ‍‍‍ | 5 | – | 7 | .417 | 9 | – | 25 | .265 |
| Northeast Louisiana ‍‍‡‍ | 3 | – | 9 | .250 | 17 | – | 32 | .347 |
| Arkansas State ‍‍‍ | 0 | – | 12 | .000 | 3 | – | 28 | .097 |
† – Conference champion ‡ – Tournament champion y – Invited to the NCAA tournament As of May 20, 1986; Rankings from Coaches' Poll

== Women's College World Series ==
The 1986 NCAA Women's College World Series took place May 21–25, 1986 in Omaha, Nebraska.

Upper round 1
Northwestern | 0
California | 2
Cal State Fullerton | 1^{9}
Long Beach State | 0
Texas A&M | 1^{10}
Creighton | 0
Indiana | 1^{10}
Louisiana Tech | 0

Upper round 2
California | 0
Cal State Fullerton | 3
Texas A&M | 6
Indiana | 0
Lower round 1
Northwestern | 0
Long Beach State | 1^{10}
Creighton | 4^{13}
Louisiana Tech | 3

Upper final
Cal State Fullerton | 3
Texas A&M | 0
Lower round 2
Indiana | 2^{10}
Long Beach State | 0
California | 1^{8}
Creighton | 0

Semifinals
Cal State Fullerton | 3^{8}
Indiana | 1
Texas A&M | 1^{10}
California | 0

Final
Cal State Fullerton | 3
Texas A&M | 0

== Season leaders ==
Batting

- Batting average: .453 – Jackie Nietopski, Niagara Purple Eagles
- RBIs: 41 – Debbi Oraczewski, Towson Tigers, Jeanne Weinsheim, San Diego Toreros & Melanie Marshall, Tennessee Tech Golden Eagles
- Home runs: 10 – Debbi Oraczewski, Towson Tigers

Pitching

- Wins: 35-9 – Stacey Johnson, Louisiana Tech Lady Techsters
- ERA: 0.18 (4 ER/153.1 IP) – Connie Clark, Cal State Fullerton Titans
- Strikeouts: 370 – Amy Unterbrink, Indiana Hoosiers

== Records ==
NCAA Division I season WHIP: 0.36 (58 H+13 BB/195.0 IP) – Virginia Augusta, North Carolina Tar Heels

NCAA Division I single game triples: 3 – Lynna Hallick, Northwestern Wildcats; April 18, 1986

Junior class perfect games: 3 – Virginia Augusta, North Carolina Tar Heels

Team single game triples: 7 – UMass Minutewomen; March 17, 1986

== Awards ==
- Honda Sports Award Softball:

Susan LeFebvre, Cal State Fullerton Titans

| YEAR | W | L | GP | GS | CG | SHO | SV | IP | H | R | ER | BB | SO | ERA | WHIP |
| 1986 | 31 | 6 | 39 | 36 | 34 | 25 | 0 | 284.2 | 106 | 18 | 11 | 59 | 208 | 0.27 | 0.58 |

== All America Teams ==
The following players were members of the first All-American Teams.

First Team

| Position | Player | Class | School |
|---|---|---|---|
| P | Stacey Johnson | SR. | Louisiana Tech Lady Techsters |
| P | Amy Unterbrink | SR. | Indiana Hoosiers |
| P | Susan LeFebvre | SR. | Cal State Fullerton Titans |
| C | Alicia Seegert | JR. | Michigan Wolverines |
| 1B | Kathy Dyer | SR. | New Mexico Lobos |
| 2B | Alison Stowell | SO. | Cal Poly Pomona Broncos |
| 3B | Cindy Cooper | SR. | Texas A&M Aggies |
| SS | Leslie Kanter | SR. | USF Bulls |
| OF | Kathy Escarcega | JR. | Arizona State Sun Devils |
| OF | Chenita Rogers | JR. | Cal State Fullerton Titans |
| OF | Karleen Moore | SR. | Indiana Hoosiers |
| UT | Tracy Bunge | SR. | Kansas Jayhawks |

Second Team

| Position | Player | Class | School |
|---|---|---|---|
| P | Lori Sippel | SO. | Nebraska Cornhuskers |
| P | Melanie Parrent | SO. | Fresno State Bulldogs |
| P | Rhonda Wheatley | JR. | Cal Poly Pomona Broncos |
| C | Kelly Downs | JR. | Kansas Jayhawks |
| 1B | Gena Strang | SO. | Fresno State Bulldogs |
| 2B | Lori Richins | JR. | Nebraska Cornhuskers |
| 3B | Mary Hammen | SO. | Oklahoma State Cowgirls |
| SS | Kelly Smith | JR. | Utah State Aggies |
| OF | Sheila Connelly | JR. | Kansas Jayhawks |
| OF | Kris Schmidt | SO. | Missouri Tigers |
| OF | Sally Mahar | SR. | UMass Minutewomen |
| UT | Barb Drake | JR. | Minnesota Golden Gophers |
