= 1990 Fresno State Bulldogs softball team =

American college softball season

1990 Fresno State Bulldogs softball

NCAA Regional No. 2 champion PCAA Champion

Women's College World Series, runner-up
- Conference: Pacific Coast Athletic Association
- Record: 62–15 (29–7 PCAA)
- Head coach: Margie Wright (5th season)

1990 Pacific Coast Athletic Association softball standings
	Conf.				Overall
Team	W		L	PCT	W		L	PCT
Fresno State ‍†‍‍^{y}	29	–	7	.806	62	–	15	.805
Long Beach State ‍‍‍^{y}	28	–	8	.778	48	–	19	.716
Cal State Fullerton ‍‍‍^{y}	22	–	13	.629	45	–	23	.662
UNLV ‍‍‍^{y}	21	–	15	.583	41	–	27	.603
San Jose State ‍‍‍^{y}	18	–	18	.500	34	–	28	.548
Cal Poly Pomona ‍‍‍	16	–	20	.444	34	–	32	.515
Pacific ‍‍‍	15	–	21	.417	30	–	28	.517
San Diego State ‍‍‍	11	–	24	.314	21	–	38	.356
UC Santa Barbara ‍‍‍	11	–	25	.306	23	–	34	.404
Hawaii ‍‍‍	8	–	28	.222	24	–	41	.369
† – Conference champion y – Invited to the NCAA tournament

The 1990 Fresno State Bulldogs softball team represented California State University, Fresno in the 1990 NCAA Division I softball season. The Bulldogs were coached by Margie Wright, who led her fifth season. The Bulldogs finished with a record of 62–15. They competed in the Pacific Coast Athletic Association, where they finished first with a 29–7 record.

The Bulldogs were invited to the 1990 NCAA Division I Softball Tournament, where they swept the NCAA Regional and then completed a run to the title game of the Women's College World Series where they fell to champion UCLA for the third year in a row.

== Roster ==
1990 Fresno State Bulldogs roster
Pitchers: 45 - Terry Carpenter; 31 - Marcie Green; Catchers: 35 - Shelly Stokes	Infielders: 30 - Carie Dever; 21 - Kerri Donis; 42 - Gina LoPiccolo; 33 - Martha Noffsinger; 15 - Julie Smith	Outfielders: 5 - Michelle Gardiner; 7 - Dina Lopez; 10 - Donna McDaniel; 20 - Shelly Morrison; 25 - RaeAnn Pifferini; 24 - Misty Poplawski

== Schedule ==
Legend
	Fresno State win
	Fresno State loss
*	Non-Conference game

1990 Fresno State Bulldogs softball game log
Regular season

Date	Opponent	Site/stadium	Score	Overall record	NCAC record
	vs Arizona State*	Titan Softball Complex • Fullerton, CA (Big West–Pac-10 Showdown)	W 7–0	1–0	
Feb 10	vs UCLA*	Titan Softball Complex • Fullerton, CA (Big West–Pac-10 Showdown)	L 1–2	1–1	
Feb 11	vs UCLA*	Titan Softball Complex • Fullerton, CA (Big West–Pac-10 Showdown)	L 1–5	1–2	
	vs Oregon*	Titan Softball Complex • Fullerton, CA (Big West–Pac-10 Showdown)	W 8–0	2–2	
	New Mexico State*	Bulldog Diamond • Fresno, CA	W 6–0	3–2	
	US International*	Bulldog Diamond • Fresno, CA	W 3–0	4–2	
	Minnesota*	Bulldog Diamond • Fresno, CA	W 8–0	5–2	
	vs Colorado State*		W 6–0	6–2	
	vs Arizona*		L 1–6	6–3	
	vs Minnesota*		W 8–0	7–3	
	vs New Mexico*		W 3–1	8–3	
	vs Northwestern*		W 10–1	9–3	
	vs New Mexico State*		W 6–1	10–3	
	vs Arizona*		L 2–3	10–4	
	UNLV	Bulldog Diamond • Fresno, CA	L 2–5	10–5	0–1
	UNLV	Bulldog Diamond • Fresno, CA	W 1–0	11–5	1–1
	Pacific	Bulldog Diamond • Fresno, CA	W 2–1	12–5	2–1
	Pacific	Bulldog Diamond • Fresno, CA	W 1–0	13–5	3–1
	Cal State Fullerton	Bulldog Diamond • Fresno, CA	W 7–0	14–5	4–1
	Cal State Fullerton	Bulldog Diamond • Fresno, CA	L 1–3	14–6	4–2
	at San Jose State	San Jose, CA	W 1–0	15–6	5–2
	at San Jose State	San Jose, CA	W 3–1	16–6	6–2
	UMass*	Bulldog Diamond • Fresno, CA	W 12–0	17–6	
	UMass*	Bulldog Diamond • Fresno, CA	W 7–0	18–6	
	Hawaii	Bulldog Diamond • Fresno, CA	W 4–0	19–6	7–2
	Hawaii	Bulldog Diamond • Fresno, CA	W 4–0	20–6	8–2
	Hawaii	Bulldog Diamond • Fresno, CA	W 9–1	21–6	9–2
	Hawaii	Bulldog Diamond • Fresno, CA	W 3–0	22–6	10–2
	vs Utah*		W 3–1	23–6	
	vs Oregon*		L 0–1	23–7	
	vs Bowling Green*		W 4–0	24–7	
	vs Oregon State*		W 8–0	25–7	
	vs Nebraska*		W 9–3	26–7	
	vs Oklahoma State*		W 2–0	27–7	
	vs Arizona*		W 1–0	28–7	
	Long Beach State	Bulldog Diamond • Fresno, CA	W 2–0	29–7	11–2
	Long Beach State	Bulldog Diamond • Fresno, CA	W 2–0	30–7	12–2
	UC Santa Barbara	Bulldog Diamond • Fresno, CA	W 4–0	31–7	13–2
	UC Santa Barbara	Bulldog Diamond • Fresno, CA	W 2–0	32–7	14–2
	at California*	Hearst Field • Berkeley, CA	W 2–0	33–7	
	at California*	Hearst Field • Berkeley, CA	W 1–0	34–7	
	Cal Poly Pomona	Bulldog Diamond • Fresno, CA	W 5–0	35–7	15–2
	Cal Poly Pomona	Bulldog Diamond • Fresno, CA	W 2–1	36–7	16–2
	California*	Bulldog Diamond • Fresno, CA	W 2–1	37–7	
	California*	Bulldog Diamond • Fresno, CA	W 1–0	38–7	
	San Diego State	Bulldog Diamond • Fresno, CA	W 8–1	39–7	17–2
	San Diego State	Bulldog Diamond • Fresno, CA	W 3–0	40–7	18–2
	at Long Beach State	Long Beach, CA	W 3–0	41–7	19–2
	at Long Beach State	Long Beach, CA	L 1–3	41–8	19–3
	at Cal State Fullerton	Titan Softball Complex • Fullerton, CA	W 1–0	42–8	20–3
	at Cal State Fullerton	Titan Softball Complex • Fullerton, CA	W 3–0	43–8	21–3
	San Jose State	Bulldog Diamond • Fresno, CA	W 3–1	44–8	22–3
	San Jose State	Bulldog Diamond • Fresno, CA	W 1–0	45–8	23–3
	at UNLV	Paradise, NV	L 0–2	45–9	23–4
	at UNLV	Paradise, NV	W 6–1	46–9	24–4
	at Cal Poly Pomona	Pomona, CA	L 1–2	46–10	23–5
	at Cal Poly Pomona	Pomona, CA	W 1–0	47–10	24–5
	at San Diego State	San Diego, CA	W 1–0	48–10	25–5
	at San Diego State	San Diego, CA	L 0–1	48–11	25–6
	Sacramento State*		W 8–1	49–11	
	Sacramento State*		W 1–0	50–11	
	US International*		W 2–0	51–11	
	US International*		W 10–1	52–11	
	Sacramento State*		L 2–3	52–12	
	Sacramento State*		W 2–1	53–12	
	at Pacific	Stockton, CA	W 5–2	54–12	26–6
	at Pacific	Stockton, CA	W 4–1	55–12	27–6
	UC Santa Barbara	Bulldog Diamond • Fresno, CA	W 10–0	56–12	28–6
	UC Santa Barbara	Bulldog Diamond • Fresno, CA	L 0–1	56–13	28–7

Postseason

NCAA Regional No. 2
Date	Opponent	Site/stadium	Score	Overall record	NCAAT record
	Creighton	Bulldog Diamond • Fresno, CA	W 11–1^{6}	57–13	1–0
	Creighton	Bulldog Diamond • Fresno, CA	W 2–1	58–13	2–0

NCAA Women's College World Series
Date	Opponent	Site/stadium	Score	Overall record	WCWS Record
	Florida State	ASA Hall of Fame Stadium • Oklahoma City, OK	L 1–0	58–14	0–1
	Arizona	ASA Hall of Fame Stadium • Oklahoma City, OK	W 1–0	59–14	1–1
	Long Beach State	ASA Hall of Fame Stadium • Oklahoma City, OK	W 2–0	60–14	2–1
	Oklahoma State	ASA Hall of Fame Stadium • Oklahoma City, OK	W 1–0^{10}	61–14	3–1
May 27	UCLA	ASA Hall of Fame Stadium • Oklahoma City, OK	W 17–0	62–14	4–1
May 27 (Note: Game started on May 27, but suspended due to rain. Restarted in the third inning on May 28.)	UCLA	ASA Hall of Fame Stadium • Oklahoma City, OK	L 0–2	62–15	4–2
