= 1990 Arizona Wildcats softball team =

American college softball season

1990 Arizona Wildcats softball

NCAA Regional champion

Women's College World Series, T-7th
- Conference: Pacific-10 Conference
- Record: 49–17 (12–6 Pac-10)
- Head coach: Mike Candrea (5th season)

1990 Pacific-10 Conference softball standings
	Conf.				Overall
Team	W		L	PCT	W		L	PCT
UCLA ‍†‍‍^{y}	16	–	2	.889	62	–	7	.899
Arizona ‍‍‍^{y}	12	–	6	.667	49	–	17	.742
Oregon ‍‍‍^{y}	9	–	9	.500	35	–	23	.603
California ‍‍‍^{y}	9	–	9	.500	41	–	28	.594
Arizona State ‍‍‍^{y}	10	–	10	.500	43	–	32	.573
Oregon State ‍‍‍	0	–	18	.000	6	–	40	.130
† – Conference champion y – Invited to the NCAA tournament

The 1990 Arizona Wildcats softball team represented the University of Arizona in the 1990 NCAA Division I softball season. The Wildcats were coached by Mike Candrea, who led his fifth season. The Wildcats finished with a record of 49–17. They competed in the Pacific-10 Conference, where they finished second with a 12–6 record.

The Wildcats were invited to the 1990 NCAA Division I softball tournament, where they won the Regional and advanced to their third Women's College World Series. Arizona finished tied for seventh place with losses to eventual semifinalist Oklahoma State and runner-up Fresno State.

== Personnel ==
=== Roster ===
1990 Arizona Wildcats roster
Pitchers: 14 - Ginnie Scheller - Senior; 17 - Doreen Juarez - Sophomore; Catchers: 10 - Renee Rosas - Freshman; 15 - Jody Miller - Freshman	Infielders: 3 - Stephanie Salcido - Sophomore; 4 - Julie Standering - Junior; 6 - Vivian Holm - Senior; 11 - Lisa Guise - Freshman; 12 - Catherine Stedman - Sophomore; 18 - Marcie Aguilar - Junior; 20 - Nicki Dennis - Senior; 22 - Suzie Lady - Junior	Outfielders: 2 - Kristin Gauthier - Junior; 7 - Julie Jones - Junior; 23 - Stacy Redondo - Freshman

=== Coaches ===
1990 Arizona Wildcats softball coaching staff
- Mike Candrea - Head coach - 5th season
- Larry Ray - Assistant coach - 5th season

== Schedule ==
Legend
	Arizona win
	Arizona loss
*	Non-Conference game

1990 Arizona Wildcats softball game log
Regular season

February
Date	Opponent	Site/stadium	Score	Overall record	Pac-10 record
Feb 10	at US International*	San Diego, CA	W 1–0	1–0	
Feb 10	at US International*	San Diego, CA	L 1–4	1–1	
Feb 13	Oregon	UA Softball Field • Tucson, AZ	W 4–1	2–1	1–0
Feb 13	Oregon	UA Softball Field • Tucson, AZ	W 8–2	3–1	2–0
Feb 15	Oklahoma*	UA Softball Field • Tucson, AZ (Arizona Classic)	W 8–0	4–1	
Feb 15	Utah*	UA Softball Field • Tucson, AZ (Arizona Classic)	W 7–4	5–1	
Feb 16	Kansas*	UA Softball Field • Tucson, AZ (Arizona Classic)	W 4–0	6–1	
Feb 16	Cal State Fullerton*	UA Softball Field • Tucson, AZ (Arizona Classic)	W 1–0	7–1	
Feb 17	New Mexico State*	UA Softball Field • Tucson, AZ (Arizona Classic)	L 0–1	7–2	
Feb 17	Toledo*	UA Softball Field • Tucson, AZ (Arizona Classic)	L 0–2	7–3	
Feb 17	Ohio State*	UA Softball Field • Tucson, AZ (Arizona Classic)	W 3–0	8–3	
Feb 18	New Mexico State*	UA Softball Field • Tucson, AZ (Arizona Classic)	W 4–0	9–3	
Feb 18	Oregon*	UA Softball Field • Tucson, AZ (Arizona Classic)	L 1–2	9–4	
Feb 23	vs Iowa State*	Sun Devil Club Stadium • Tempe, AZ (Kajikawa Classic)	W 2–1	10–4	
Feb 23	vs Creighton*	Sun Devil Club Stadium • Tempe, AZ (Kajikawa Classic)	W 3–0	11–4	
Feb 24	vs Illinois State*	Sun Devil Club Stadium • Tempe, AZ (Kajikawa Classic)	W 3–0	12–4	
Feb 24	vs UC Santa Barbara*	Sun Devil Club Stadium • Tempe, AZ (Kajikawa Classic)	W 3–0	13–4	
Feb 25	vs Cal Poly Pomona*	Sun Devil Club Stadium • Tempe, AZ (Kajikawa Classic)	W 3–1	14–4	
Feb 25	vs Penn State*	Sun Devil Club Stadium • Tempe, AZ (Kajikawa Classic)	L 1–2	14–5	
Feb 26	Penn State*	UA Softball Field • Tucson, AZ	W 8–2	15–5	
Feb 26	Penn State*	UA Softball Field • Tucson, AZ	W 11–0	16–5	

March
Date	Opponent	Site/stadium	Score	Overall record	Pac-10 record
Mar 1	vs New Mexico*	NM State Softball Complex • Las Cruces, NM (Roadrunner Invitational)	W 4–3	17–5	
Mar 1	vs Fresno State*	NM State Softball Complex • Las Cruces, NM (Roadrunner Invitational)	W 6–1	18–5	
Mar 2	vs Colorado State*	NM State Softball Complex • Las Cruces, NM (Roadrunner Invitational)	W 6–1	19–5	
Mar 2	vs Minnesota*	NM State Softball Complex • Las Cruces, NM (Roadrunner Invitational)	W 10–2	20–5	
Mar 3	vs Minnesota*	NM State Softball Complex • Las Cruces, NM (Roadrunner Invitational)	W 10–2	21–5	
Mar 3	vs Arizona State*	NM State Softball Complex • Las Cruces, NM (Roadrunner Invitational)	W 7–1	22–5	
Mar 3	vs Fresno State*	NM State Softball Complex • Las Cruces, NM (Roadrunner Invitational)	W 3–2	23–5	
Mar 22	vs Minnesota*	Anderson Family Field • Fullerton, CA (Judi Garman Classic)	W 5–4	24–5	
Mar 22	vs Cal State Northridge*	Anderson Family Field • Fullerton, CA (Judi Garman Classic)	L 0–1	24–6	
Mar 23	vs Toledo*	Anderson Family Field • Fullerton, CA (Judi Garman Classic)	W 8–0	25–6	
Mar 23	vs Rutgers*	Anderson Family Field • Fullerton, CA (Judi Garman Classic)	W 3–0	26–6	
Mar 24	vs Utah*	Anderson Family Field • Fullerton, CA (Judi Garman Classic)	W 1–0	27–6	
Mar 25	vs Cal State Fullerton*	Anderson Family Field • Fullerton, CA (Judi Garman Classic)	W 2–0	28–6	
Mar 25	vs Fresno State*	Anderson Family Field • Fullerton, CA (Judi Garman Classic)	L 0–1	28–7	
Mar 28	at Arizona State	Sun Devil Club Stadium • Tempe, AZ	L 3–5	28–8	2–1
Mar 28	at Arizona State	Sun Devil Club Stadium • Tempe, AZ	W 6–3	29–8	3–1
Mar 30	Oregon State	UA Softball Field • Tucson, AZ	W 18–0	30–8	4–1
Mar 30	Oregon State	UA Softball Field • Tucson, AZ	W 6–0	31–8	5–1

April/May
Date	Opponent	Site/stadium	Score	Overall record	Pac-10 record
Apr 3	at New Mexico State*	NM State Softball Complex • Las Cruces, NM	W 6–0	32–8	
Apr 3	at New Mexico State*	NM State Softball Complex • Las Cruces, NM	W 4–0	33–8	
Apr 11	US International*	UA Softball Field • Tucson, AZ	W 5–0	34–8	
Apr 11	US International*	UA Softball Field • Tucson, AZ	W 4–0	35–8	
Apr 13	at Oregon State	Corvallis, OR	W 10–0	36–8	6–1
Apr 13	at Oregon State	Corvallis, OR	W 3–0	37–8	7–1
Apr 14	at Oregon	Howe Field • Eugene, OR	W 3–0	38–8	8–1
Apr 14	at Oregon	Howe Field • Eugene, OR	W 3–0	39–8	9–1
Apr 18	at UCLA	Sunset Field • Los Angeles, CA	L 0–5	39–9	9–2
Apr 18	at UCLA	Sunset Field • Los Angeles	L 0–2	39–10	9–3
Apr 21	California	UA Softball Field • Tucson, AZ	W 2–0	40–10	10–3
Apr 21	California	UA Softball Field • Tucson, AZ	W 9–0	41–10	11–3
Apr 25	Arizona State	UA Softball Field • Tucson, AZ	L 0–1	41–11	11–4
Apr 25	Arizona State	UA Softball Field • Tucson, AZ	L 0–1	41–12	11–5
Apr 27	at New Mexico*	Albuquerque, NM (SW Diamond Classic)	W 5–0	42–12	
Apr 27	at New Mexico*	Albuquerque, NM (SW Diamond Classic)	L 1–2	42–13	
Apr 28	vs Utah*	Albuquerque, NM (SW Diamond Classic)	W 2–0	43–13	
Apr 28	vs Utah*	Albuquerque, NM (SW Diamond Classic)	W 5–3	44–13	
Apr 29	vs Louisiana Tech*	Albuquerque, NM (SW Diamond Classic)	W 3–2	45–13	
Apr 29	vs Louisiana Tech*	Albuquerque, NM (SW Diamond Classic)	W 2–0	46–13	
May 5	UCLA	UA Softball Field • Tucson, AZ	W 3–2	47–13	12–5
May 5	UCLA	UA Softball Field • Tucson, AZ	L 2–3	47–14	12–6

Postseason

NCAA Regional
Date	Opponent	Site/stadium	Score	Overall record	NCAAT record
May 18	Arizona State	UA Softball Field • Tucson, AZ	L 0–1	47–15	0–1
May 19	Arizona State	UA Softball Field • Tucson, AZ	W 1–0	48–15	1–1
May 19	Arizona State	UA Softball Field • Tucson, AZ	W 9–5	49–15	2–1

NCAA Women's College World Series
Date	Opponent	Site/stadium	Score	Overall record	WCWS Record
May 24	Oklahoma State	ASA Hall of Fame Stadium • Oklahoma City, OK	L 0–3	49–16	0–1
May 25	Fresno State	ASA Hall of Fame Stadium • Oklahoma City, OK	L 0–1	49–17	0–2
