= 1989 Fresno State Bulldogs softball team =

American college softball season

1989 Fresno State Bulldogs softball

NCAA Regional No. 3 champion PCAA Champion

Women's College World Series, runner-up
- Conference: Pacific Coast Athletic Association
- Record: 58–14 (29–7 PCAA)
- Head coach: Margie Wright (4th season)

1989 Pacific Coast Athletic Association softball standings
	Conf.						Overall
Team	W		L		T	PCT	W		L		T	PCT
Fresno State ‍†‍‍^{y}	29	–	7	–	0	.806	58	–	14	–	0	.806
Cal State Fullerton ‍‍‍^{y}	28	–	8	–	0	.778	47	–	15	–	0	.758
Cal Poly Pomona ‍‍‍^{y}	24	–	12	–	0	.667	43	–	23	–	0	.652
Long Beach State ‍‍‍^{y}	22	–	14	–	0	.611	36	–	23	–	0	.610
San Jose State ‍‍‍	21	–	15	–	0	.583	36	–	26	–	0	.581
UNLV ‍‍‍	17	–	19	–	0	.472	32	–	28	–	0	.533
UC Santa Barbara ‍‍‍	14	–	22	–	0	.389	25	–	29	–	0	.463
Hawaii ‍‍‍	10	–	26	–	0	.278	16	–	35	–	0	.314
San Diego State ‍‍‍	9	–	27	–	0	.250	18	–	38	–	1	.325
Pacific ‍‍‍	6	–	30	–	0	.167	22	–	37	–	0	.373
† – Conference champion y – Invited to the NCAA tournament

The 1989 Fresno State Bulldogs softball team represented California State University, Fresno in the 1989 NCAA Division I softball season. The Bulldogs were coached by Margie Wright, who led her fourth season. The Bulldogs finished with a record of 58–14. They competed in the Pacific Coast Athletic Association, where they finished first with a 29–7 record.

The Bulldogs were invited to the 1989 NCAA Division I Softball Tournament, where they swept the NCAA Regional and then completed a run to the title game of the Women's College World Series where they fell to champion UCLA for the second year in a row.

== Roster ==
1989 Fresno State Bulldogs roster
Pitchers: 45 - Terry Carpenter; Catchers: 35 - Shelly Stokes	Infielders: 30 - Carie Dever; 21 - Kerri Donis; 42 - Gina LoPiccolo; 18 - Kathy Mayer; 33 - Martha Noffsinger	Outfielders: 41 - Dionne Ewing; 7 - Dina Lopez; 20 - Shelly Morrison; 25 - RaeAnn Pifferini; 10 - Jill Polanco; 24 - Misty Poplawski; 40 - Mia Rexroth; Utility: - Carol Taniguchi

== Schedule ==
Legend
	Fresno State win
	Fresno State loss
*	Non-Conference game

1989 Fresno State Bulldogs softball game log
Regular season

Date	Opponent	Site/stadium	Score	Overall record	NCAC record
	Saint Mary's*	Bulldog Diamond • Fresno, CA	W 12–0	1–0	
	Saint Mary's*	Bulldog Diamond • Fresno, CA	W 7–0	2–0	
	San Francisco*	Bulldog Diamond • Fresno, CA	W 5–0	3–0	
	US International*	Bulldog Diamond • Fresno, CA	W 6–0	4–0	
Feb 26	UCLA*	Bulldog Diamond • Fresno, CA	W 2–0	5–0	
	vs Oklahoma*		W 9–3	6–0	
	vs Oregon*		W 5–3	7–0	
	vs Arizona State*		W 6–0	8–0	
	vs Minnesota*		W 8–2	9–0	
	vs New Mexico State*		W 6–0	10–0	
	vs Northeast Louisiana*		L 0–2	10–1	
	at UNLV	Paradise, NV	W 2–0	11–1	1–1
	at UNLV	Paradise, NV	W 5–2	12–1	2–0
	at Cal State Fullerton	Anderson Family Field • Fullerton, CA	L 4–5	12–2	2–1
	at Cal State Fullerton	Anderson Family Field • Fullerton, CA	W 8–0	13–2	3–1
	Adelphi*	Bulldog Diamond • Fresno, CA	W 2–0	14–2	
	Adelphi*	Bulldog Diamond • Fresno, CA	W 2–0	15–2	
	Long Beach State	Bulldog Diamond • Fresno, CA	W 1–0	16–2	4–1
	Long Beach State	Bulldog Diamond • Fresno, CA	W 5–0	17–2	5–1
	UMass*	Bulldog Diamond • Fresno, CA	W 7–0	18–2	
	UMass*	Bulldog Diamond • Fresno, CA	W 2–0	19–2	
	Bowling Green*		W 8–0	20–2	
	Oregon*		W 4–1	21–2	
	vs Nebraska*		W 4–3	22–2	
	vs US International*		W 1–0	23–2	
	vs Texas A&M*		W 3–1	24–2	
	vs Oklahoma State*		L 0–2	24–3	
	Pacific	Bulldog Diamond • Fresno, CA	W 1–0	25–3	6–1
	Pacific*	Bulldog Diamond • Fresno, CA	W 1–0	26–3	7–1
	at Hawaii	Wahine Softball Field • Honolulu, HI	L 3–4	26–4	7–2
	at Hawaii	Wahine Softball Field • Honolulu, HI	W 1–0	27–4	8–2
	at Hawaii	Wahine Softball Field • Honolulu, HI	W 1–0	28–4	9–2
	at Hawaii	Wahine Softball Field • Honolulu, HI	W 3–2	29–4	10–2
	at California*	Hearst Field • Berkeley, CA	W 6–5	30–4	
	at California*	Hearst Field • Berkeley, CA	W 6–0	31–4	
	at San Jose State	San Jose, CA	W 4–2	32–4	11–2
	at San Jose State	San Jose, CA	W 3–2	33–4	12–2
	US International*	Bulldog Diamond • Fresno, CA	L 0–2	33–5	
	US International*	Bulldog Diamond • Fresno, CA	W 1–0	34–5	
	UC Santa Barbara	Bulldog Diamond • Fresno, CA	L 0–1	34–6	12–3
	UC Santa Barbara	Bulldog Diamond • Fresno, CA	W 5–0	35–6	13–3
	at Cal Poly Pomona	Pomona, CA	L 1–2	35–7	13–4
	at Cal Poly Pomona	Pomona, CA	W 3–0	36–7	14–4
Apr 16	at UCLA*	Sunset Field • Los Angeles, CA	L 1–2	36–8	
Apr 16	at UCLA*	Sunset Field • Los Angeles, CA	L 1–2	36–9	
	UC Santa Barbara	Bulldog Diamond • Fresno, CA	W 1–0	37–9	15–4
	UC Santa Barbara	Bulldog Diamond • Fresno, CA	W 5–0	38–9	16–4
	Cal State Fullerton	Bulldog Diamond • Fresno, CA	L 3–4	38–10	16–5
	Cal State Fullerton	Bulldog Diamond • Fresno, CA	W 4–0	39–10	17–5
	Cal Poly Pomona	Bulldog Diamond • Fresno, CA	L 1–2	39–11	17–6
	Cal Poly Pomona	Bulldog Diamond • Fresno, CA	L 0–1	39–12	17–7
	San Diego State	Bulldog Diamond • Fresno, CA	W 10–0	40–12	18–7
	San Diego State	Bulldog Diamond • Fresno, CA	W 5–0	41–12	19–7
	at Long Beach State	Long Beach, CA	W 3–1	42–12	20–7
	at Long Beach State	Long Beach, CA	W 1–0	43–12	21–7
	at San Diego State	San Diego, California	W 4–0	44–12	22–7
	at San Diego State	San Diego, CA	W 10–3	45–12	23–7
	California*	Bulldog Diamond • Fresno, CA	W 2–1	46–12	
	California*	Bulldog Diamond • Fresno, CA	W 3–2	47–12	
	San Jose State	Bulldog Diamond • Fresno, CA	W 1–0	48–12	23–7
	San Jose State	Bulldog Diamond • Fresno, CA	W 7–0	49–12	24–7
	UNLV	Bulldog Diamond • Fresno, CA	W 3–2	50–12	25–7
	UNLV	Bulldog Diamond • Fresno, CA	W 4–1	51–12	26–7
	at Pacific	Stockton, CA	W 5–0	52–12	28–7
	at Pacific	Stockton, CA	W 4–0	53–12	29–7

Postseason

NCAA Regional No. 3
Date	Opponent	Site/stadium	Score	Overall record	NCAAT record
	California	Bulldog Diamond • Fresno, CA	W 1–0	54–12	1–0
	California	Bulldog Diamond • Fresno, CA	W 6–0	55–12	2–0

NCAA Women's College World Series
Date	Opponent	Site/stadium	Score	Overall record	WCWS Record
	Arizona	Twin Creeks Sports Complex • Sunnyvale, CA	L 0–12	55–13	0–1
	Toledo	Twin Creeks Sports Complex • Sunnyvale, CA	W 3–0	56–13	1–1
	Cal Poly Pomona	Twin Creeks Sports Complex • Sunnyvale, CA	W 5–1	57–13	2–1
	Oklahoma State	Twin Creeks Sports Complex • Sunnyvale, CA	W 7–0	58–13	3–1
May 28	UCLA	Twin Creeks Sports Complex • Sunnyvale, CA	L 0–1	58–14	3–2
