= 1986 Texas A&M Aggies softball team =

American college softball season

1986 Texas A&M Aggies softball

NCAA Central Regional champion

Women's College World Series, runner-up
- Conference: Independent
- Record: 41–13
- Head coach: Bob Brock (5th season)

The 1986 Texas A&M Aggies softball team represented Texas A&M University in the 1986 NCAA Division I softball season. The Aggies were coached by Bob Brock, who led his fifth season. The Bulldogs finished with a record of 41–13.

The Aggies were invited to the 1986 NCAA Division I Softball Tournament, where they swept the NCAA Central Regional and then completed a run to the title game of the Women's College World Series where they fell to champion Cal State Fullerton.

== Roster ==
1986 Texas A&M Aggies roster
| Pitchers: - Shawn Andaya - Junior; - Julie Carpenter - Freshman; Catchers Outfielders: - Cindy Foster - Senior; - Erin Newkirk - Freshman; - Tory Parks - Freshman | Infielders: - Cindy Cooper - Senior; - Liz Mizera - Sophomore; - Mary Schwind - Senior; - Judy Trussell - Junior | Unknown: - Karen Athanacio; - Carrie Heightley - Freshman; - Zina Ochoa - Sophomore; - Debbie Rollman - Senior; - Rita Shea; - Tara Szymczak |

== Schedule ==
Legend
| | Texas A&M win |
| | Texas A&M loss |
| * | Non-Conference game |

1986 Texas A&M Aggies softball game log
Regular season

February/March
| Date | Opponent | Site/stadium | Score | Overall record |
|---|---|---|---|---|
| Feb 28 | vs Mississippi State | Colonels Softball Diamond • Thibodaux, LA | W 6–0 | 1–0 |
| Feb 28 | vs Toledo | Colonels Softball Diamond • Thibodaux, LA | W 2– | 2–0 |
| Feb 28 | vs Southwest Texas State | Colonels Softball Diamond • Thibodaux, LA | W 10–0 | 3–0 |
| Mar 1 | vs Southwestern Louisiana | Colonels Softball Diamond • Thibodaux, LA | W 2–1 | 4–0 |
| Mar 1 | at Nicholls State | Colonels Softball Diamond • Thibodaux, LA | W 1–0 | 5–0 |
| Mar 1 | vs Louisiana Tech | Colonels Softball Diamond • Thibodaux, LA | W 6–0 | 6–0 |
| Mar 8 | vs Southwest Texas State | Waco, TX | W 5–0 | 7–0 |
| Mar 8 | at Baylor | Waco, TX | W 7–0 | 8–0 |
| Mar 9 | vs Texas–Arlington | Waco, TX | W 6–0 | 9–0 |
| Mar 9 | vs Creighton | Waco, TX | L 1–3 | 9–1 |
| Mar 15 | at UCLA | Sunset Field • Los Angeles, CA | W 1–0 | 10–1 |
| Mar 16 | at Cal State Fullerton | Titan Softball Complex • Fullerton, CA | L 0–1^{12} | 10–2 |
| Mar 16 | at Cal State Fullerton | Titan Softball Complex • Fullerton, CA | W 1–0^{12} | 11–2 |
| Mar 19 | vs California | Titan Softball Complex • Fullerton, CA (PONY Invitational) | L 0–1 | 11–3 |
| Mar 20 | vs UNLV | Titan Softball Complex • Fullerton, CA (PONY Invitational) | W 5–3 | 12–3 |
| Mar 20 | vs California | Titan Softball Complex • Fullerton, CA (PONY Invitational) | W 1–0 | 13–3 |
| Mar 21 | vs Long Beach State | Titan Softball Complex • Fullerton, CA (PONY Invitational) | W 1–0 | 14–3 |
| Mar 22 | vs Arizona | Titan Softball Complex • Fullerton, CA (PONY Invitational) | W 6–0 | 15–3 |
| Mar 23 | vs Fresno State | Titan Softball Complex • Fullerton, CA (PONY Invitational) | L 1–2 | 15–4 |
| Mar 26 | Minnesota | College Station, TX | W 4–0 | 16–4 |
| Mar 27 | vs Utah | Houston, TX (Houston Classic) | W 2–0 | 17–4 |
| Mar 27 | vs Oklahoma State | Houston, TX (Houston Classic) | W 5–2 | 18–4 |
| Mar 28 | vs Florida State | Houston, TX (Houston Classic) | L 0–1 | 18–5 |
| Mar 28 | vs Adelphi | Houston, TX (Houston Classic) | W 4–1 | 19–5 |
| Mar 28 | vs Arizona State | Houston, TX (Houston Classic) | L 0–2 | 19–6 |
| Mar 29 | Southwestern Louisiana | College Station, TX | L 2–3 | 19–7 |
| Mar 29 | Utah | College Station, TX | W 3–0 | 20–7 |

April
| Date | Opponent | Site/stadium | Score | Overall record |
|---|---|---|---|---|
| Apr 3 | Baylor | College Station, TX | W 3–0 | 21–7 |
| Apr 3 | Baylor | College Station, TX | W 3–0 | 22–7 |
| Apr 8 | at Southwest Texas State | Bobcat Field • San Marcos, TX | W 5–1 | 23–7 |
| Apr 8 | at Southwest Texas State | Bobcat Field • San Marcos, TX | W 6–0 | 24–7 |
| Apr 12 | at South Carolina | Carolina Softball Stadium • Columbia, SC | L 0–2 | 24–8 |
| Apr 12 | at South Carolina | Carolina Softball Stadium • Columbia, SC | W 3–1 | 25–8 |
| Apr 13 | at South Carolina | Carolina Softball Stadium • Columbia, SC | W 7–3 | 26–8 |
| Apr 13 | at South Carolina | Carolina Softball Stadium • Columbia, SC | W 1–0 | 27–8 |
| Apr 15 | at Texas–Arlington | Allan Saxe Field • Arlington, TX | W 2–1 | 28–8 |
| Apr 15 | at Texas–Arlington | Allan Saxe Field • Arlington, TX | W 1–0 | 29–8 |
| Apr 20 | at Louisiana Tech | Lady Techster Softball Complex • Ruston, LA | W 2–0 | 30–8 |
| Apr 20 | at Louisiana Tech | Lady Techster Softball Complex • Ruston, LA | W 1–0 | 31–8 |
| Apr 22 | Texas–Arlington | College Station, TX | W 2–1 | 32–8 |
| Apr 22 | Texas–Arlington | College Station, TX | W 1–0 | 33–8 |
| Apr 24 | vs Oklahoma | Logan, UT (Coca-Cola Classic) | L 1–3 | 33–9 |
| Apr 24 | vs BYU | Logan, UT (Coca-Cola Classic) | W 4–0 | 34–9 |

May
| Date | Opponent | Site/stadium | Score | Overall record |
|---|---|---|---|---|
| May 3 | at Louisiana Tech | Lady Techster Softball Complex • Ruston, LA | L 0–1 | 34–10 |
| May 3 | at Louisiana Tech | Lady Techster Softball Complex • Ruston, LA | L 0–1 | 34–11 |
| May 4 | Northeastern Louisiana | College Station, TX | W 4–0 | 35–11 |
| May 4 | Northeast Louisiana | College Station, TX | W 8–0 | 36–11 |

Postseason

NCAA Central Regional
| Date | Opponent | Site/stadium | Score | Overall record | NCAAT record |
|---|---|---|---|---|---|
| May 16 | Kansas | College Station, TX | W 1–0 | 37–11 | |
| May 16 | Kansas | College Station, TX | W 1–0 | 38–11 | |

NCAA Women's College World Series
| Date | Opponent | Site/stadium | Score | Overall record | WCWS Record |
|---|---|---|---|---|---|
| May 22 | Creighton | Seymour Smith Park • Omaha, NE | W 1–0^{10} | 39–11 | 1–0 |
| May 23 | Indiana | Seymour Smith Park • Omaha, NE | W 6–0 | 40–11 | 2–0 |
| May 24 | Cal State Fullerton | Seymour Smith Park • Omaha, NE | L 0–3 | 40–12 | 2–1 |
| May 24 | California | Seymour Smith Park • Omaha, NE | W 1–0^{10} | 41–12 | 3–1 |
| May 25 | Cal State Fullerton | Seymour Smith Park • Omaha, NE | L 0–3 | 41–13 | 3–2 |
