= 1986 Cal State Fullerton Titans softball team =

American college softball season

1986 Cal State Fullerton Titans softball

National Champion NCAA West Regional champion PCAA champion
- Conference: Pacific Coast Athletic Association
- Record: 57–9–1 (22–5–1 PCAA)
- Head coach: Judi Garman (7th season)

1986 Pacific Coast Athletic Association softball standings
	Conf.						Overall
Team	W		L		T	PCT	W		L		T	PCT
Cal State Fullerton ‍†‍‍^{y}	22	–	5	–	1	.804	57	–	9	–	1	.858
Long Beach State ‍‍‍^{y}	18	–	9	–	0	.667	39	–	18	–	0	.684
Cal Poly Pomona ‍‍‍^{y}	18	–	9	–	1	.661	36	–	19	–	1	.652
Pacific ‍‍‍^{y}	17	–	10	–	0	.630	34	–	18	–	1	.651
UC Santa Barbara ‍‍‍	11	–	17	–	0	.393	20	–	30	–	0	.400
UNLV ‍‍‍	10	–	17	–	0	.370	18	–	32	–	0	.360
San Diego State ‍‍‍	6	–	21	–	0	.222	22	–	36	–	0	.379
Hawaii ‍‍‍	7	–	21	–	0	.250	9	–	27	–	0	.250
† – Conference champion y – Invited to the NCAA tournament

The 1986 Cal State Fullerton Titans softball team represented California State University, Fullerton in the 1986 NCAA Division I softball season. The Titans were coached by Judi Garman, who led her seventh season. The Titans finished with a record of 57–9–1. They competed in the Pacific Coast Athletic Association, where they finished first with a 22–5–1 record.

The Titans were invited to the 1986 NCAA Division I softball tournament, where they swept the West Regional and then completed a run through the Women's College World Series to claim their first NCAA Women's College World Series Championship.

== Roster ==
1986 Cal State Fullerton Titans roster
Pitchers: 3 – April Jones – junior; 20 - Connie Clark – junior; 32 – Susan LeFebvre – senior; Catchers: 10 – Michelle Gromacki – junior; 22 – Kristin Goodall – freshman	Infielders: 4 – Andrea Gray – freshman; 7 – Terri Oberg – senior; 8 – Valerie Van Kirk – sophomore; 16 – Robin Goodin – senior; 21 – JoAnn Ferrieri – senior	Outfielders: 5 – Rina Foster – sophomore; 6 – Chenita Rogers – junior; 12 – Diane Dodd – senior; 13 – Corina Smith – junior; 18 – Alani Silva – junior; 23 – Yvonne Solis – junior; Utility: 2 – Cheryl Dazalla – sophomore; 25 – Charis Monroe – freshman

== Schedule ==
Legend
	Cal State Fullerton win
	Cal State Fullerton loss
	Tie
*	Non-Conference game

1986 Cal State Fullerton Titans softball game log
Regular season

February
Date	Opponent	Site/stadium	Score	Overall record	PCAA Record
Feb 21	Chapman*	Titan Softball Complex • Fullerton, CA	W 2–1	1–0	
Feb 21	Fresno State*	Titan Softball Complex • Fullerton, CA	W 1–0	2–0	
Feb 22	Fresno State*	Titan Softball Complex • Fullerton, CA	W 1–0	3–0	
Feb 22	US International*	Titan Softball Complex • Fullerton, CA	W 4–0	4–0	
Feb 26	UC Riverside*	Titan Softball Complex • Fullerton, CA	W 3–0	5–0	
Feb 26	UC Riverside*	Titan Softball Complex • Fullerton, CA	W 1–0	6–0	
Feb 28	Cal State Dominguez Hills*	Titan Softball Complex • Fullerton, CA	W 2–1	7–0	
Feb 28	Cal State Dominguez Hills*	Titan Softball Complex • Fullerton, CA	W 2–1	8–0	

March
Date	Opponent	Site/stadium	Score	Overall record	PCAA Record
Mar 5	Louisiana Tech*	Titan Softball Complex • Fullerton, CA	W 1–0	9–0	
Mar 5	Louisiana Tech*	Titan Softball Complex • Fullerton, CA	W 4–0	10–0	
Mar 7	vs Fresno State*	Rebel Softball Diamond • Paradise, NV	L 0–1	10–1	
Mar 7	vs Oklahoma City*	Rebel Softball Diamond • Paradise, NV	W 9–0	11–1	
Mar 7	vs Utah*	Rebel Softball Diamond • Paradise, NV	L 1–2^{11}	11–2	
Mar 8	vs Southern Utah*	Rebel Softball Diamond • Paradise, NV	W 9–0	12–2	
Mar 8	vs South Florida*	Rebel Softball Diamond • Paradise, NV	W 4–0	13–2	
Mar 9	vs UCLA*	Rebel Softball Diamond • Paradise, NV	W 2–1^{10}	14–2	
Mar 9	vs Fresno State*	Rebel Softball Diamond • Paradise, NV	W 4–1	15–2	
Mar 9	vs Oklahoma State*	Rebel Softball Diamond • Paradise, NV	W 6–0	16–2	
Mar 14	UNLV	Titan Softball Complex • Fullerton, CA	W 4–0	17–2	1–0
Mar 14	UNLV	Titan Softball Complex • Fullerton, CA	W 6–0	18–2	2–0
Mar 17	Texas A&M*	Titan Softball Complex • Fullerton, CA	W 1–0	19–2	
Mar 17	Texas A&M*	Titan Softball Complex • Fullerton, CA	L 0–1^{12}	19–3	
Mar 18	Northwestern*	Titan Softball Complex • Fullerton, CA	W 6–0	20–3	
Mar 20	Oregon State*	Titan Softball Complex • Fullerton, CA	W 5–0	21–3	
Mar 21	Michigan*	Titan Softball Complex • Fullerton, CA	W 1–0^{11}	22–3	
Mar 21	Adelphi*	Titan Softball Complex • Fullerton, CA	W 3–0	23–3	
Mar 22	Arizona*	Titan Softball Complex • Fullerton, CA	W 4–0	24–3	
Mar 22	California*	Titan Softball Complex • Fullerton, CA	W 5–0	25–3	
Mar 23	Northwestern Wildcats*	Titan Softball Complex • Fullerton, CA	W 2–1^{8}	26–3	
Mar 23	Fresno State*	Titan Softball Complex • Fullerton, CA	W 6–0^{10}	27–3	
Mar 25	Pacific	Titan Softball Complex • Fullerton, CA	W 1–0	28–3	3–0
Mar 25	Pacific	Titan Softball Complex • Fullerton, CA	L 1–2^{9}	28–4	3–1
Mar 27	at UC Santa Barbara	Santa Barbara, CA	W 2–1^{9}	29–4	4–1
Mar 27	at UC Santa Barbara	Santa Barbara, CA	W 7–0	30–4	5–1

April
Date	Opponent	Site/stadium	Score	Overall record	PCAA Record
Apr 1	at Long Beach State	Long Beach, CA	L 0–1	30–5	5–2
Apr 1	at Long Beach State	Long Beach, CA	W 1–0	31–5	6–2
Apr 3	at San Diego State	San Diego, CA	W 3–0	32–5	7–2
Apr 3	at San Diego State	San Diego, CA	W 9–1	33–5	8–2
Apr 6	at Cal Poly Pomona	Pomona, CA	W 3–0	34–5	9–2
Apr 11	at UNLV	Rebel Softball Diamond • Paradise, NV	W 16–0	35–5	10–2
Apr 11	at UNLV	Rebel Softball Diamond • Paradise, NV	W 4–0	36–5	11–2
Apr 13	San Diego State	Titan Softball Complex • Fullerton, CA	W 4–0	37–5	12–2
Apr 13	San Diego State	Titan Softball Complex • Fullerton, CA	W 2–1	38–5	13–2
Apr 17	at Hawaii	Wahine Softball Field • Hononlulu, HI	W 1–0	39–5	14–2
Apr 17	at Hawaii	Wahine Softball Field • Honolulu, HI	W 4–1	40–5	15–2
Apr 18	at Hawaii	Wahine Softball Field • Honolulu, HI	W 2–0	41–5	16–2
Apr 18	at Hawaii	Wahine Softball Field • Honolulu, HI	W 8–1	42–5	17–2
Apr 23	at US International	San Diego, CA	W 3–0	43–5	
Apr 23	at US International	San Diego, CA	W 4–0	44–5	
Apr 26	at UCLA*	Sunset Field • Los Angeles, CA	W 3–2	45–5	
Apr 26	at UCLA*	Sunset Field • Los Angeles, CA	L 0–6	45–6	
Apr 30	Cal Poly Pomona	Titan Softball Complex • Fullerton, CA	W 1–0^{12}	46–6	18–2
Apr 30	Cal Poly Pomona	Titan Softball Complex • Fullerton, CA	L 0–1	46–7	18–3

May
Date	Opponent	Site/stadium	Score	Overall record	PCAA Record
May 2	UC Santa Barbara	Titan Softball Complex • Fullerton, CA	W 4–0	47–7	19–3
May 2	UC Santa Barbara	Titan Softball Complex • Fullerton, CA	W 2–0	48–7	20–3
May 6	at Cal Poly Pomona	Pomona, CA	T 1–1^{11}	48–7–1	20–3–1
May 8	at Pacific	Stockton, CA	W 2–0	49–7–1	21–3–1
May 8	at Pacific	Stockton, CA	L 0–1	49–8–1	21–4–1
May 10	Long Beach State	Titan Softball Complex • Fullerton, CA	L 1–4	49–9–1	21–5–1
May 10	Long Beach State	Titan Softball Complex • Fullerton, CA	W 3–1	50–9–1	22–5–1

Postseason

NCAA West Regional
Date	Opponent	Site/stadium	Score	Overall record	NCAAT record
May 16	Cal Poly Pomona	Titan Softball Complex • Fullerton, CA	W 2–0	51–9–1	1–0
May 17	Cal Poly Pomona	Titan Softball Complex • Fullerton, CA	W 1–0	52–9–1	2–0

NCAA Women's College World Series
Date	Opponent	Site/stadium	Score	Overall record	WCWS Record
May 21	Long Beach State	Seymour Smith Park • Omaha, NE	W 1–0^{9}	53–9–1	1–0
May 23	California	Seymour Smith Park • Omaha, NE	W 3–0	54–9–1	2–0
May 24	Texas A&M	Seymour Smith Park • Omaha, NE	W 3–0	55–9–1	3–0
May 24	Indiana	Seymour Smith Park • Omaha, NE	W 3–1^{8}	56–9–1	4–0
May 25	Texas A&M	Seymour Smith Park • Omaha, NE	W 3–0	57–9–1	5–0
