= 1990 UCLA Bruins softball team =

American college softball season

1990 UCLA Bruins softball

National Champion NCAA Regional champion
- Conference: Pacific-10 Conference
- Record: 62–7 (16–2 Pac-10)
- Head coach: Sharron Backus (16th season) & Sue Enquist (2nd season)
- Home stadium: Sunset Field

1990 Pacific-10 Conference softball standings
	Conf.				Overall
Team	W		L	PCT	W		L	PCT
UCLA ‍†‍‍^{y}	16	–	2	.889	62	–	7	.899
Arizona ‍‍‍^{y}	12	–	6	.667	49	–	17	.742
Oregon ‍‍‍^{y}	9	–	9	.500	35	–	23	.603
California ‍‍‍^{y}	9	–	9	.500	41	–	28	.594
Arizona State ‍‍‍^{y}	10	–	10	.500	43	–	32	.573
Oregon State ‍‍‍	0	–	18	.000	6	–	40	.130
† – Conference champion y – Invited to the NCAA tournament

The 1990 UCLA Bruins softball team represented the University of California, Los Angeles in the 1990 NCAA Division I softball season. The Bruins were coached by Sharron Backus, who led her sixteenth season and Sue Enquist, in her second season, in an uncommonly used co-head coach system. The Bruins played their home games at Sunset Field and finished with a record of 62–7. They competed in the Pacific-10 Conference, where they finished first with a 16–2 record.

The Bruins were invited to the 1990 NCAA Division I softball tournament, where they swept the West Regional and then completed a run through the Women's College World Series to claim their fifth NCAA Women's College World Series Championship. The Bruins had earlier claimed an AIAW title in 1978 and NCAA titles in 1982, 1984, 1988, and 1989.

== Personnel ==
=== Roster ===
1990 UCLA Bruins roster
Pitchers: 5 – DeeDee Weiman – freshman; 9 – Lisa Longaker – senior; 11 – Heather Compton – freshman; 16 - Lisa Fernandez – freshman; Catchers: 2 - Kelly Inouye – sophomore; 13 – Erica Ziencina – junior	Infielders: 4 – Kristy Howard – freshman; 12 - Kerry Dienelt – junior; 15 – Missy Phillips – junior	Outfielders: 3 – Maria Rodriguez – freshman; 7 – Shanna Flynn – junior; 8 – Yvonne Gutierrez – sophomore; 10 – Michelle Montgomery – senior; 19 – Bea Chiaravanont – junior

=== Coaches ===
1990 UCLA Bruins softball coaching staff
- Sharron Backus - co-Head coach - 16th season
- Sue Enquist - co-Head coach - 2nd season
- Kirk Walker - Assistant Coach - 1st season

== Schedule ==
Legend
	UCLA win
	UCLA loss
*	Non-Conference game

1990 UCLA Bruins softball game log
Regular season

February
Date	Opponent	Site/stadium	Score	Overall record	Pac-10 record
Feb 3	at US International*		W 2–0^{8}	1–0	
Feb 3	at US International*		L 2–3	1–1	
Feb 10	at Cal State Fullerton*	Titan Softball Complex • Fullerton, CA (Big West–Pac-10 Showdown)	W 1–0	2–1	
Feb 10	vs Fresno State*	Titan Softball Complex • Fullerton, CA (Big West–Pac-10 Showdown)	W 2–1	3–1	
Feb 11	vs Fresno State*	Titan Softball Complex • Fullerton, CA (Big West–Pac-10 Showdown)	W 5–1	4–1	
Feb 11	at Cal State Fullerton*	Titan Softball Complex • Fullerton, CA (Big West–Pac-10 Showdown)	L 0–2	4–2	
Feb 15	vs Kansas*	Tucson, AZ (Arizona Tournament)	W 10–2^{6}	5–2	
Feb 15	vs New Mexico State*	Tucson, AZ (Arizona Tournament)	W 2–0	6–2	
Feb 16	vs Toledo*	Tucson, AZ (Arizona Tournament)	W 4–0	7–2	
Feb 16	vs Oklahoma*	Tucson, AZ (Arizona Tournament)	W 7–1	8–2	
Feb 16	vs Utah*	Tucson, AZ (Arizona Tournament)	W 11–0^{5}	9–2	
Feb 17	vs Arizona State*	Tucson, AZ (Arizona Tournament)	W 1–0	10–2	
Feb 17	vs Cal State Fullerton*	Tucson, AZ (Arizona Tournament)	L 0–5	10–3	
Feb 18	vs Utah*	Tucson, AZ (Arizona Tournament)	W 3–0	11–3	
Feb 18	vs Long Beach State*	Tucson, AZ (Arizona Tournament)	W 7–2	12–3	
Feb 18	vs Oregon*	Tucson, AZ (Arizona Tournament)	W 2–0	13–3	
Feb 23	at Long Beach State*	Long Beach, CA	W 5–0	14–3	
Feb 23	at Long Beach State*	Long Beach, CA	W 1–0	15–3	
Feb 25	at San Diego State*	San Diego, CA	W 5–1	16–3	
Feb 25	at San Diego State*	San Diego, CA	W 5–0	17–3	
Feb 27	Cal Poly Pomona*	Sunset Field • Los Angeles, CA	W 4–0	18–3	
Feb 27	Cal Poly Pomona*	Sunset Field • Los Angeles, CA	W 2–0	19–3	

March
Date	Opponent	Site/stadium	Score	Overall record	Pac-10 record
Mar 2	vs San Diego State*	Paradise, NV (UNLV Spring Fling)	W 4–0	20–3	
Mar 2	vs Cal State Northridge*	Paradise, NV (UNLV Spring Fling)	W 2–1	21–3	
Mar 2	vs Southern Utah*	Paradise, NV (UNLV Spring Fling)	W 11–0^{6}	22–3	
Mar 3	vs Utah*	Paradise, NV (UNLV Spring Fling)	L 1–3	22–4	
Mar 3	vs Sacramento State*	Paradise, NV (UNLV Spring Fling)	W 2–0	23–4	
Mar 4	vs Southern Utah*	Paradise, NV (UNLV Spring Fling)	W 3–1	24–4	
Mar 4	vs Cal Poly Pomona*	Paradise, NV (UNLV Spring Fling)	W 2–1	25–4	
Mar 14	Hawaii*	Sunset Field • Los Angeles, CA	W 3–0	26–4	
Mar 14	Hawaii*	Sunset Field • Los Angeles, CA	W 5–0	27–4	
Mar 26	Oregon State	Sunset Field • Los Angeles, CA	W 5–0	28–4	1–0
Mar 26	Oregon State	Sunset Field • Los Angeles, CA	W 4–0	29–4	2–0
Mar 27	Oregon	Sunset Field • Los Angeles, CA	W 1–0	30–4	3–0
Mar 27	Oregon	Sunset Field • Los Angeles, CA	L 0–3^{8}	30–5	3–1
Mar 31	at California	Hearst Field • Berkeley, CA	W 2–0	31–5	4–1
Mar 31	at California	Hearst Field • Berkeley, CA	W 2–1	32–5	5–1

April
Date	Opponent	Site/stadium	Score	Overall record	Pac-10 record
Apr 1	at Santa Clara*	Santa Clara, CA	W 2–0	33–5	
Apr 1	at Santa Clara*	Santa Clara, CA	W 1–0	34–5	
Apr 7	Arizona State	Sunset Field • Los Angeles, CA	W 6–1	35–5	6–1
Apr 7	Arizona State	Sunset Field • Los Angeles, CA	W 2–0	36–5	7–1
Apr 8	San Jose State*	Sunset Field • Los Angeles, CA	W 1–0	37–5	
Apr 8	San Jose State*	Sunset Field • Los Angeles, CA	W 1–0^{10}	38–5	
Apr 10	at Cal Poly Pomona*	Pomona, CA	W 5–0	39–5	
Apr 10	at Cal Poly Pomona*	Pomona, CA	W 2–0	40–5	
Apr 13	California	Sunset Field • Los Angeles, CA	W 1–0^{10}	41–5	8–1
Apr 13	California	Sunset Field • Los Angeles, CA	W 1–0	42–5	9–1
Apr 18	Arizona	Sunset Field • Los Angeles, CA	W 5–0	43–5	10–1
Apr 18	Arizona	Sunset Field • Los Angeles, CA	W 2–0	44–5	11–1
Apr 21	at Oregon State	Corvallis, OR	W 4–0	45–5	12–1
Apr 21	at Oregon State	Corvallis, OR	W 10–0^{5}	46–5	13–1
Apr 25	Cal State Fullerton*	Sunset Field • Los Angeles, CA	W 5–0	47–5	
Apr 25	Cal State Fullerton*	Sunset Field • Los Angeles, CA	W 1–0	48–5	
Apr 28	Sacramento State*	Sunset Field • Los Angeles, CA	W 6–1	49–5	
Apr 28	Sacramento State*	Sunset Field • Los Angeles, CA	W 3–0	50–5	

May
Date	Opponent	Site/stadium	Score	Overall record	Pac-10 record
May 3	at Arizona State	Tempe, AZ	W 2–0	51–5	14–1
May 3	at Arizona State	Tempe, AZ	W 4–0	52–5	15–1
May 5	at Arizona	Tucson, AZ	L 2–3	52–6	15–2
May 5	at Arizona	Tucson, AZ	W 3–2	53–6	16–2
May 9	US International*	Sunset Field • Los Angeles, CA	W 10–1	54–6	
May 9	US International*	Sunset Field • Los Angeles, CA	W 6–1	55–6	

Postseason

NCAA Regional
Date	Opponent	Site/stadium	Score	Overall record	NCAAT record
May 18	Northern Iowa	Sunset Field • Los Angeles, CA	W 2–0	56–6	1–0
May 19	Northern Iowa	Sunset Field • Los Angeles, CA	W 4–0	57–6	2–0

NCAA Women's College World Series
Date	Opponent	Site/stadium	Score	Overall record	WCWS Record
May 23	Kent State	ASA Hall of Fame Stadium • Oklahoma City, OK	W 4–0	58–6	1–0
May 25	Long Beach State	ASA Hall of Fame Stadium • Oklahoma City, OK	W 6–0	59–6	2–0
May 26	Oklahoma State	ASA Hall of Fame Stadium • Oklahoma City, OK	W 2–1	60–6	3–0
May 27	Florida State	ASA Hall of Fame Stadium • Oklahoma City, OK	W 3–0	61–6	4–0
May 27	Fresno State	ASA Hall of Fame Stadium • Oklahoma City, OK	L 0–1	61–7	4–1
May 27 (Note: Game started on May 27, but suspended due to rain. Restarted in the third inning on May 28.)	Fresno State	ASA Hall of Fame Stadium • Oklahoma City, OK	W 2–0	62–7	5–1
