= List of Cal State Fullerton Titans head softball coaches =

The Cal State Fullerton Titans softball program is a college softball team that represents the California State University, Fullerton in the Big West Conference in the National Collegiate Athletic Association. The team has had three head coaches since it started playing organized softball in the 1980 season.

== Key ==
General
#	Number of coaches (Note: A running total of the number of head coaches.)
GC	Games coached

Overall
OW	Wins
OL	Losses
OT	Ties
O%	Winning percentage

Conference (Note: Cal State Fullerton played as a member of the Western Collegiate Athletic Association from 1980–1986, when the Big West Conference began sponsoring women's sports)
CW	Wins
CL	Losses
CT	Ties
C%	Winning percentage

Postseason (Note: Postseason play involving the NCAA Division I Softball Championship or AIAW Women's College World Series.)
PA	Total Appearances (Note: Postseason appearances include seasons with NCAA Division I Softball Championship bids since the tournament began in 1982.)
PW	Total Wins
PL	Total Losses
WA	Women's College World Series appearances (Note: Women's College World Series appearances include seasons with WCWS bids since the tournament began in 1969.)
WW	Women's College World Series Wins
WL	Women's College World Series Losses

Championships
CC	Conference regular season
NC	National championships (Note: Women's College World Series sponsored by either the AIAW or NCAA.)

== Coaches ==
List of head softball coaches showing season(s) coached, overall records, conference records, postseason records, championships and selected awards (Note: Statistics correct as of the end of the 2021 NCAA Division I softball season.)
#	Name	Term	GC	OW	OL	OT	O%	CW	CL	CT	C%	PA	WA	CCs	NCs
1	Judi Garman	1980–1999	1,293	913	376	4	.708	288	167	2	.632	16	6	9	1
2	Michelle Gromacki	2000–2012	727	424	302	1	.584	185	88	0	.678	9	0	5	0
3	Kelly Ford	2013–present	479	300	178	1	.627	128	46	0	.736	4	0	4	0
