= 1990 NCAA Division III baseball tournament =

- Season: 1990
- Teams: 24
- Finals site: C. O. Brown Stadium; Battle Creek, Michigan
- Champions: Eastern Connecticut State (2nd title)
- Runner-up: Aurora

The 1990 NCAA Division III baseball tournament was played at the end of the 1990 NCAA Division III baseball season to determine the 15th national champion of college baseball at the NCAA Division III level. The tournament concluded with six teams competing at a new location at C. O. Brown Stadium in Battle Creek, Michigan, for the championship. Six regional tournaments were held to determine the participants in the World Series. Regional tournaments were contested in double-elimination format, with one region consisting of six teams, four regions consisting of four teams, and one region consisting of two teams, which was played as best-of-five, for a total of 24 teams participating in the tournament. The tournament champion was Eastern Connecticut State, who defeated Aurora for the championship.

== See also ==
- 1990 NCAA Division I baseball tournament
- 1990 NCAA Division II baseball tournament
- 1990 NCAA Division I softball tournament
- 1990 NAIA World Series
