= Shelly Stokes =

American softball player

Personal information
- Born: October 26, 1967 (age 58) Sacramento, California, U.S.
Medal record
Women's softball
Representing the United States
Olympic Games
Gold medal – first place	1996 Atlanta	Team competition

Shelly Stokes (born October 26, 1967) is an American, former collegiate All-American and Olympic champion, right-handed softball player originally from Sacramento, California. Stokes was a catcher for the Fresno State Bulldogs in the Big West Conference from 1987-90. She led them to three back-to-back runner-up finishes in the 1988, 1989 and 1990 Women's College World Series, also being named All-Tournament in the 1989 series. Stokes would go on to win gold with Team USA in the 1996 Atlanta Olympics.

== Career ==
She competed at the 1996 Summer Olympics in Atlanta where she received a gold medal with the American team. Stokes had a hit, RBI and walked twice at the games.

Stokes played NCAA softball for California State University, Fresno.

== Statistics ==
=== Fresno State Bulldogs ===
YEAR	G	AB	R	H	BA	RBI	HR	3B	2B	TB	SLG	BB	SO	SB	SBA
1989	72	228	30	64	.280	28	1	6	13	92	.403%	24	10	2	3
1990	77	233	26	58	.249	22	2	1	8	74	.317%	19	13	0	1
TOTALS	149	461	56	122	.264	50	3	7	21	166	.360%	43	23	2	4
