= 1989 NCAA Division I softball season =

American college softball season

- Defending Champions: UCLA

Tournament

Women's College World Series
- Duration: May 24–28, 1989
- Champions: UCLA (5th (6th overall) title)
- Runners-up: Fresno State (5th WCWS Appearance)
- Winning Coach: Sharron Backus & Sue Enquist (5th (6th overall) & 1st title)

Seasons
- ← 1988 1990 →

The 1989 NCAA Division I softball season, play of college softball in the United States organized by the National Collegiate Athletic Association (NCAA) at the Division I level, began in February 1989. The season progressed through the regular season, many conference tournaments and championship series, and concluded with the 1989 NCAA Division I softball tournament and 1989 Women's College World Series. The Women's College World Series, consisting of the eight remaining teams in the NCAA Tournament and held in Sunnyvale, California at Twin Creeks Sports Complex, ended on May 28, 1989.

== Conference standings ==
1989 Big Ten Conference softball standings
	Conf.						Overall
Team	W		L		T	PCT	W		L		T	PCT
Iowa ‍†‍‍^{y}	17	–	7	–	0	.708	40	–	21	–	0	.656
Michigan ‍‍‍	16	–	8	–	0	.667	42	–	20	–	0	.677
Northwestern ‍‍‍	14	–	10	–	0	.583	26	–	25	–	0	.510
Indiana ‍‍‍	13	–	11	–	0	.542	31	–	21	–	0	.596
Minnesota ‍‍‍	11	–	13	–	0	.458	27	–	29	–	0	.482
Michigan State ‍‍‍	7	–	17	–	0	.292	23	–	29	–	0	.442
Ohio State ‍‍‍	6	–	18	–	0	.250	15	–	36	–	0	.294
† – Conference champion y – Invited to the NCAA tournament Rankings from Coaches' Poll

1989 Pacific-10 Conference softball standings
	Conf.				Overall
Team	W		L	PCT	W		L	PCT
UCLA ‍†‍‍^{y}	18	–	2	.900	48	–	4	.923
Oregon ‍‍‍^{y}	13	–	7	.650	54	–	18	.750
Arizona ‍‍‍^{y}	11	–	9	.550	48	–	19	.716
California ‍‍‍^{y}	10	–	10	.500	38	–	26	.594
Arizona State ‍‍‍^{y}	7	–	13	.350	34	–	26	.567
Oregon State ‍‍‍	1	–	19	.050	7	–	30	.189
† – Conference champion y – Invited to the NCAA tournament As of May 31, 1989; Rankings from Coaches' Poll

1989 Pacific Coast Athletic Association softball standings
	Conf.						Overall
Team	W		L		T	PCT	W		L		T	PCT
Fresno State ‍†‍‍^{y}	29	–	7	–	0	.806	58	–	14	–	0	.806
Cal State Fullerton ‍‍‍^{y}	28	–	8	–	0	.778	47	–	15	–	0	.758
Cal Poly Pomona ‍‍‍^{y}	24	–	12	–	0	.667	43	–	23	–	0	.652
Long Beach State ‍‍‍^{y}	22	–	14	–	0	.611	36	–	23	–	0	.610
San Jose State ‍‍‍	21	–	15	–	0	.583	36	–	26	–	0	.581
UNLV ‍‍‍	17	–	19	–	0	.472	32	–	28	–	0	.533
UC Santa Barbara ‍‍‍	14	–	22	–	0	.389	25	–	29	–	0	.463
Hawaii ‍‍‍	10	–	26	–	0	.278	16	–	35	–	0	.314
San Diego State ‍‍‍	9	–	27	–	0	.250	18	–	38	–	1	.325
Pacific ‍‍‍	6	–	30	–	0	.167	22	–	37	–	0	.373
† – Conference champion y – Invited to the NCAA tournament

1989 Southland Conference softball standings
	Conf.						Overall
Team	W		L		T	PCT	W		L		T	PCT
Texas–Arlington ‍†‍‍	10	–	2	–	0	.833	34	–	19	–	0	.642
Sam Houston State ‍‍‍	9	–	3	–	0	.750	37	–	20	–	0	.649
Stephen F. Austin ‍‍‍	8	–	4	–	0	.667	37	–	15	–	0	.712
Northwestern Louisiana ‍‍‍	5	–	7	–	0	.417	32	–	29	–	0	.525
Northeast Louisiana ‍‍‍	5	–	7	–	0	.417	27	–	36	–	0	.429
Southwest Texas State ‍‍‡‍	5	–	7	–	0	.417	16	–	30	–	0	.348
McNeese State ‍‍‍	0	–	14	–	0	.000	9	–	45	–	0	.167
† – Conference champion ‡ – Tournament champion y – Invited to the NCAA tournament As of May 20, 1989; Rankings from Coaches' Poll

== Women's College World Series ==
The 1989 NCAA Women's College World Series took place from May 24 to May 28, 1989 in Sunnyvale, California.

Upper round 1
UCLA	3
South Carolina	0
Cal Poly Pomona	1
Oregon	0
Arizona	12^{5}
Fresno State	0
Oklahoma State	3
Toledo	1

Upper round 2
UCLA	9
Cal Poly Pomona	0
Arizona	0
Oklahoma State	4^{8}
Lower round 1
South Carolina	0
Oregon	1
Fresno State	3
Toledo	0

Upper final
UCLA	2
Oklahoma State	1
Lower round 2
Arizona	4
Oregon	0
Cal Poly Pomona	1
Fresno State	5

Semifinals
UCLA	3
Arizona	0
Oklahoma State	0
Fresno State	7

Final
UCLA	1
Fresno State	0

== Season leaders ==
Batting

- Batting average: .477 – Jocelyn Kondrotas, Maine Black Bears
- RBIs: 56 – Nicki Dennis, Arizona Wildcats
- Home runs: 9 – Julie Sherman, UConn Huskies

Pitching

- Wins: 42-13 – Katie Wiese, Oregon Ducks
- ERA: 0.24 (5 ER/146.0 IP) – Tiffany Boyd, UCLA Bruins
- Strikeouts: 256 – Lisa Kemme, Winthrop Eagles

== Records ==
Freshman class innings pitched: 393.0 – Dana Mitchell, Texas A&M Aggies

Senior class at bats: 255 – Kathy Mayer, Fresno State Bulldogs

== Awards ==
- Honda Sports Award Softball:

Janice Parks, UCLA Bruins

YEAR	G	AB	R	H	BA	RBI	HR	3B	2B	TB	SLG	BB	SO	SB	SBA
1989	52	162	32	69	.426	36	2	7	10	99	.611%	19	7	2	3

== All America Teams ==
The following players were members of the All-American Teams.

First Team

Position	Player	Class	School
P	Katie Wiese	FR.	Oregon Ducks
P	Terry Carpenter	SR.	Fresno State Bulldogs
P	Michele Smith	SR.	Oklahoma State Cowgirls
C	Lisa Harvey	SR.	Oklahoma State Cowgirls
1B	Missy Coombes	JR.	Cal State Fullerton Titans
2B	Michelle Delloso	SO.	South Carolina Gamecocks
3B	Janice Parks	SR.	UCLA Bruins
SS	Shari Johnson	SR.	Oklahoma State Cowgirls
OF	Jill Justin	SR.	Northern Illinois Huskies
OF	Carey Hess	JR.	Cal State Fullerton Titans
OF	Tricia Popowski	SO.	South Carolina Gamecocks
UT	Jenny Allard	JR.	Michigan Wolverines

Second Team

Position	Player	Class	School
P	Carie Dever	JR.	Fresno State Bulldogs
P	Stefni Whitton	JR.	ULL Ragin' Cajuns
P	Debbie Nichols	JR.	Louisiana Tech Lady Techsters
C	Delanna Lightfoot	JR.	UTA Mavericks
1B	Julie Liljeberg	SO.	Western Michigan Broncos
2B	Beth Bull	JR.	Central Michigan Chippewas
3B	Karla Ismay	SR.	New Mexico Lobos
SS	Tiffany Daniels	SR.	FSU Seminoles
OF	Shanna Flynn	SO.	UCLA Bruins
OF	Jenny Condon	JR.	Iowa State Cyclones
OF	Shonta Garr	SO.	Sam Houston State Bearkats
UT	Kim Manning	FR.	Oregon Ducks
