= 1989 UCLA Bruins softball team =

American college softball season

1989 UCLA Bruins softball

National Champion NCAA Northwest Regional champion
- Conference: Pacific-10 Conference
- Record: 48–4 (18–2 Pac-10)
- Head coach: Sharron Backus (15th season) & Sue Enquist (1st season)
- Home stadium: Sunset Field

1989 Pacific-10 Conference softball standings
	Conf.				Overall
Team	W		L	PCT	W		L	PCT
UCLA ‍†‍‍^{y}	18	–	2	.900	48	–	4	.923
Oregon ‍‍‍^{y}	13	–	7	.650	54	–	18	.750
Arizona ‍‍‍^{y}	11	–	9	.550	48	–	19	.716
California ‍‍‍^{y}	10	–	10	.500	38	–	26	.594
Arizona State ‍‍‍^{y}	7	–	13	.350	34	–	26	.567
Oregon State ‍‍‍	1	–	19	.050	7	–	30	.189
† – Conference champion y – Invited to the NCAA tournament

The 1989 UCLA Bruins softball team represented the University of California, Los Angeles in the 1989 NCAA Division I softball season. The Bruins were coached by Sharron Backus, who led her fifteenth season and Sue Enquist, in her first season, in an uncommonly used co-head coach system. The Bruins played their home games at Sunset Field and finished with a record of 48–4. They competed in the Pacific-10 Conference, where they finished first with a 18–2 record.

The Bruins were invited to the 1989 NCAA Division I softball tournament, where they swept the West Regional and then completed a run through the Women's College World Series to claim their fourth NCAA Women's College World Series Championship. The Bruins had earlier claimed an AIAW title in 1978 and NCAA titles in 1982, 1984, and 1988.

== Personnel ==
=== Roster ===
1989 UCLA Bruins roster
Pitchers: 4 – Samantha Ford – senior; 9 – Lisa Longaker – junior; 18 – Tiffany Boyd – freshman; Catchers: 2 - Kelly Inouye – freshman; 13 – Erica Ziencina – sophomore; 22 – Monica Tourville – senior	Infielders: 12 - Kerry Dienelt – sophomore; 14 – Janice Parks – senior; 15 – Missy Phillips – sophomore; 17 – Karen Walker – senior	Outfielders: 1 – Lorraine Maynez – sophomore; 3 – Bea Chiaravanont – sophomore; 6 – Julie Poulos – junior; 7 – Shanna Flynn – sophomore; 8 – Yvonne Gutierrez – freshman; 10 – Michelle Montgomery – junior

=== Coaches ===
1989 UCLA Bruins softball coaching staff
- Sharron Backus - 15th season
- Sue Enquist - 1st season
- Kirk Walker - 6th season

== Schedule ==
Legend
	UCLA win
	UCLA loss
*	Non-Conference game

1989 UCLA Bruins softball game log
Regular season

February
Date	Opponent	Site/stadium	Score	Overall record	Pac-10 record
Feb 2	Saint Mary's*	Sunset Field • Los Angeles, CA	W 10–0^{6}	1–0	
Feb 2	Saint Mary's*	Sunset Field • Los Angeles, CA	W 8–0	2–0	
Feb 6	San Francisco*	Sunset Field • Los Angeles, CA	W 9–0	3–0	
Feb 6	San Francisco*	Sunset Field • Los Angeles, CA	W 11–0^{5}	4–0	
Feb 18	at UC Santa Barbara*	Santa Barbara, CA	W 4–0	5–0	
Feb 18	at UC Santa Barbara*	Santa Barbara, CA	W 2–0^{8}	6–0	
Feb 24	vs US International*	Bulldog Diamond • Fresno, CA	W 1–0	7–0	
Feb 24	vs San Francisco*	Fresno, CA	W 9–0	8–0	
Feb 26	at Fresno State*	Fresno, CA	L 0–2	8–1	

March
Date	Opponent	Site/stadium	Score	Overall record	Pac-10 record
Mar 1	Long Beach State*	Sunset Field • Los Angeles, CA	W 5–0	9–1	
Mar 1	Long Beach State*	Sunset Field • Los Angeles, CA	W 2–0	10–1	
Mar 6	Cal Poly Pomona*	Sunset Field • Los Angeles, CA	W 2–1^{11}	11–1	
Mar 6	Cal Poly Pomona*	Sunset Field • Los Angeles, CA	W 2–1	12–1	
Mar 10	California	Sunset Field • Los Angeles, CA	W 1–0	13–1	1–0
Mar 10	California	Sunset Field • Los Angeles, CA	W 2–0	14–1	2–0
Mar 11	Arizona	Sunset Field • Los Angeles, CA	W 2–1	15–1	3–0
Mar 11	Arizona	Sunset Field • Los Angeles, CA	W 6–2	16–1	4–0
Mar 27	Oregon State	Sunset Field • Los Angeles, CA	W 3–0	17–1	5–0
Mar 27	Oregon State	Sunset Field • Los Angeles, CA	W 6–0	18–1	6–0
Mar 30	Oregon	Sunset Field • Los Angeles, CA	W 1–0	19–1	7–0
Mar 30	Oregon	Sunset Field • Los Angeles, CA	L 0–1	19–2	7–1

April
Date	Opponent	Site/stadium	Score	Overall record	Pac-10 record
Apr 1	at Saint Mary's*	Moraga, CA	W 1–0	20–2	
Apr 1	at Saint Mary's*	Moraga, CA	W 6–0	21–2	
Apr 2	at California	Hearst Field • Berkeley, CA	W 7–2	22–2	8–1
Apr 2	at California	Hearst Field • Berkeley, CA	W 2–0	23–2	9–1
Apr 12	at Cal Poly Pomona*	Pomona, CA	W 4–1	24–2	
Apr 12	at Cal Poly Pomona*	Pomona, CA	W 1–0^{8}	25–2	
Apr 15	US International*	Sunset Field • Los Angeles, CA	W 8–0	26–2	
Apr 15	US International*	Sunset Field • Los Angeles, CA	W 8–0	27–2	
Apr 16	Fresno State*	Sunset Field • Los Angeles, CA	W 2–1	28–2	
Apr 16	Fresno State*	Sunset Field • Los Angeles, CA	W 2–1	29–2	
Apr 21	at Arizona State	Tempe, AZ	W 4–0	30–2	10–1
Apr 21	at Arizona State	Tempe, AZ	W 1–0	31–2	11–1
Apr 22	at Arizona	Tucson, AZ	W 4–2	32–2	12–1
Apr 22	at Arizona	Tucson, AZ	L 1–2	32–3	12–2
Apr 25	at Cal State Fullerton*	Titan Softball Complex • Fullerton, CA	L 6–7^{15}	32–4	
Apr 25	at Cal State Fullerton*	Titan Softball Complex • Fullerton, CA	W 2–1^{9}	33–4	
Apr 29	at US International*		W 8–0	34–4	
Apr 29	at US International*		W 12–0	35–4	

May
Date	Opponent	Site/stadium	Score	Overall record	Pac-10 record
May 5	at Oregon State	Corvallis, OR	W 2–0	36–4	13–2
May 5	at Oregon State	Corvallis, OR	W 6–0	37–4	14–2
May 6	at Oregon	Howe Field • Eugene, OR	W 3–2	38–4	15–2
May 6	at Oregon	Howe Field • Eugene, OR	W 2–0	39–4	16–2
May 13	Arizona State	Sunset Field • Los Angeles, CA	W 1–0^{8}	40–4	17–2
May 13	Arizona State	Sunset Field • Los Angeles, CA	W 4–1	41–4	18–2

Postseason

NCAA Northwest Regional
Date	Opponent	Site/stadium	Score	Overall record	NCAAT record
May 19	Long Beach State	Sunset Field • Los Angeles, CA	W 5–1	42–4	1–0
May 20	Long Beach State	Sunset Field • Los Angeles, CA	W 3–0	43–4	2–0

NCAA Women's College World Series
Date	Opponent	Site/stadium	Score	Overall record	WCWS Record
May 24	South Carolina	Twin Creeks Sports Complex • Sunnyvale, CA	W 3–0	44–4	1–0
May 26	Cal Poly Pomona	Twin Creeks Sports Complex • Sunnyvale, CA	W 9–0	45–4	2–0
May 27	Oklahoma State	Twin Creeks Sports Complex • Sunnyvale, CA	W 2–1	46–4	3–0
May 27	Arizona	Twin Creeks Sports Complex • Sunnyvale, CA	W 3–0	47–4	4–0
May 28	Fresno State	Twin Creeks Sports Complex • Sunnyvale, CA	W 1–0	48–4	5–0
