= 1990 NCAA Division II baseball tournament =

- Season: 1990
- Finals site: Paterson Field; Montgomery, Alabama
- Champions: Jacksonville State (1st title)
- Runner-up: Cal State Northridge (4th CWS Appearance)
- Winning coach: Rudy Abbott (1st title)
- MOP: Tim Van Egmond (P) (Jacksonville State)
- Attendance: 14,055

The 1990 NCAA Division II baseball tournament was the postseason tournament hosted by the NCAA to determine the national champion of baseball among its Division II colleges and universities at the end of the 1990 NCAA Division II baseball season.

The final, eight-team double-elimination tournament was played at Paterson Field in Montgomery, Alabama.

Jacksonville State defeated Cal State Northridge, 12–8, in the final, claiming the Gamecocks' first Division II national title.

== Bracket ==
=== College World Series ===
First Round
Jacksonville State	3
Philadelphia Textile	1
Central Missouri State	2
Tampa	10
Philadelphia Textile	9
Central Missouri State	25
Cal State Northridge	18
Lewis	5
Columbus College	4
New Haven	15
Lewis	8
Columbus College	1

Second Round
Jacksonville State	10
Tampa	8
Tampa	10
Central Missouri State	5
Cal State Northridge	18
New Haven	5
New Haven	2
Lewis	3

Semifinals
Jacksonville State	3	—
Tampa	0	—
Cal State Northridge	8	—
Lewis	6	—

Championship
Jacksonville State	12
Cal State Northridge	8

== See also ==
- 1990 NCAA Division I baseball tournament
- 1990 NCAA Division III baseball tournament
- 1990 NAIA World Series
- 1990 NCAA Division II softball tournament
