= 1986 NCAA Division I softball tournament =

- Teams: 15
- Finals site: Seymour Smith Park; Omaha, NE
- Champions: Cal State Fullerton (1st title)
- Runner-up: Texas A&M (3rd WCWS Appearance)
- Winning coach: Judi Garman (1st WCWS title)

The 1986 NCAA Division I softball tournament was the fifth annual tournament to determine the national champion of NCAA women's collegiate softball. Held during May 1986 to mark the conclusion of the 1986 NCAA Division I softball season, fifteen Division I college softball teams contested the championship. The tournament featured seven regionals of two teams (the last team, Creighton, qualified automatically) with the winner of each region (a total of 7 teams plus Creighton) advancing to the 1986 Women's College World Series at Seymour Smith Park in Omaha, Nebraska. Cal State Fullerton won the championship by defeating Texas A&M 1–0 in the final game.

== Regionals ==
West Regional
| – | Cal State Fullerton | 2 | 1 | — |
| – | Cal Poly Pomona | 0 | 0 | — |

- Cal State Fullerton qualifies for WCWS, 2–0

Mideast Regional
| – | Indiana | 2 | 5 | — |
| – | Central Michigan | 0 | 0 | — |

- Indiana qualifies for WCWS, 2–0

South Regional
| – | Louisiana Tech | 4 | 1 | — |
| – | Florida State | 0 | 0 | — |

- Louisiana Tech qualifies for WCWS, 2–0

Central Regional
| – | Texas A&M | 1 | 1^{10} | — |
| – | Kansas | 0 | 0 | — |

- Texas A&M qualifies for WCWS, 2–0

- Midwest Regional was not held
  - Creighton qualified as eighth team.

Northeast Regional
| – | Northwestern | 3 | 6 | — |
| – | Massachusetts | 0 | 0 | — |

- Northwestern qualifies for WCWS, 2–0

Northwest Regional
| – | Long Beach State | 4^{12} | 2 | — |
| – | Fresno State | 1 | 1 | — |

- Long Beach State qualifies for WCWS, 2–0

At-large Regional
| – | California | 1 | 3 | 2 |
| – | Pacific | 3 | 0 | 0 |

- California qualifies for WCWS, 2–1

== Women's College World Series ==
=== Participants ===
- California
- Cal State Fullerton
- Creighton
- Indiana
- Long Beach State
- Louisiana Tech
- Northwestern
- Texas A&M

=== Game results ===
==== Bracket ====
Upper round 1
Northwestern | 0
California | 2
Cal State Fullerton | 1^{9}
Long Beach State | 0
Texas A&M | 1^{10}
Creighton | 0
Indiana | 1^{10}
Louisiana Tech | 0

Upper round 2
California | 0
Cal State Fullerton | 3
Texas A&M | 6
Indiana | 0
Lower round 1
Northwestern | 0
Long Beach State | 1^{10}
Creighton | 4^{13}
Louisiana Tech | 3

Upper final
Cal State Fullerton | 3
Texas A&M | 0
Lower round 2
Indiana | 2^{10}
Long Beach State | 0
California | 1^{8}
Creighton | 0

Semifinals
Cal State Fullerton | 3^{8}
Indiana | 1
Texas A&M | 1^{10}
California | 0

Final
Cal State Fullerton | 3
Texas A&M | 0

==== Game log ====
| Date | Game | Winning team | Score | Losing team | Notes |
|---|---|---|---|---|---|
| May 21 | Game 1 | California | 2–0 | Northwestern | |
| May 21 | Game 2 | Cal State Fullerton | 1–0^{9} | Long Beach State | |
| May 22 | Game 3 | Texas A&M | 1–0^{10} | Creighton | |
| May 22 | Game 4 | Indiana | 1–0^{10} | Louisiana Tech | |
| May 23 | Game 5 | Long Beach State | 1–0^{10} | Northwestern | Northwestern eliminated |
| May 23 | Game 6 | Creighton | 4–3^{13} | Louisiana Tech | Louisiana Tech eliminated |
| May 23 | Game 7 | Cal State Fullerton | 3–0 | California | |
| May 23 | Game 8 | Texas A&M | 6–0 | Indiana | |
| May 24 | Game 9 | California | 1–0^{8} | Creighton | Creighton eliminated |
| May 24 | Game 10 | Indiana | 2–0^{10} | Long Beach State | Long Beach State eliminated |
| May 24 | Game 11 | Cal State Fullerton | 3–0 | Texas A&M | |
| May 24 | Game 12 | Texas A&M | 1–0^{10} | California | California eliminated |
| May 24 | Game 13 | Cal State Fullerton | 3–1^{8} | Indiana | Indiana eliminated |
| May 25 | Game 14 | Cal State Fullerton | 3–0 | Texas A&M | Cal State Fullerton wins WCWS |

=== Championship Game ===
| School | Top Batter | Stats. |
|---|---|---|
| Cal State Fullerton Titans | JoAnn Ferrieri (DH) | 1-3 RBI |
| Texas A&M Aggies | Tory Parks (PH) | 1-1 |

| School | Pitcher | IP | H | R | ER | BB | SO | AB | BF |
|---|---|---|---|---|---|---|---|---|---|
| Cal State Fullerton Titans | Connie Clark (W) | 7.0 | 1 | 0 | 0 | 0 | 8 | 20 | 22 |
| Texas A&M Aggies | Shawn Andaya (L) | 7.0 | 5 | 3 | 2 | 3 | 3 | 28 | 31 |

=== All-Tournament Team ===
The following players were named to the All-Tournament Team

| Pos | Name | School |
|---|---|---|
| P | Shawn Andaya | Texas A&M |
| P | Connie Clark | Cal State Fullerton |
| 1B | Robin Goodin | Cal State Fullerton |
| 2B | Judy Trussell | Texas A&M |
| 3B | Roni Deutch | California |
| SS | Liz Mizera | Texas A&M |
| OF | Tammy Connor | Indiana |
| OF | Rina Foster | Cal State Fullerton |
| OF | Chenita Rogers | Cal State Fullerton |
| OF | Sue Trubovitz | Long Beach State |
| AL | Cindy Cooper | Texas A&M |
| AL | Joey Schope | Creighton |

== See also ==
- 1986 NCAA Division II softball tournament
- 1986 NCAA Division III softball tournament
- 1986 NAIA softball tournament
- 1986 NCAA Division I baseball tournament
