= 1990 NAIA World Series =

1990 NAIA baseball tournament
- 1990 NAIA World Series
- Teams: 10
- Format: Double elimination Page playoff
- Finals site: Harris Field; Lewiston, Idaho
- Champions: Lewis–Clark State (6th title)
- Winning coach: Ed Cheff
- MVP: Mark Rasmussen (OF) (Lewis–Clark State)

The 1990 NAIA World Series was the 34th annual tournament hosted by the National Association of Intercollegiate Athletics to determine the national champion of baseball among its member colleges and universities in the United States and Canada.

The tournament was played at Harris Field in Lewiston, Idaho.

Hometown team and three-time defending champions Lewis–Clark State (43–13) defeated Auburn Montgomery (40–25) in a single-game championship series, 9–4, to win the Warriors' sixth NAIA World Series. This would go on to be the fourth of six consecutive World Series championships for the program.

Lewis–Clark State outfielder Mark Rasmussen was named tournament MVP.

== Bracket ==
=== Preliminary bracket ===
First round
Dallas Baptist	1
SE Oklahoma State	8
Lewis–Clark State	8
Lewis & Clark	0
Consolation First Round
West Liberty State	5
Dallas Baptist	6
Saint Rose	10
Lewis & Clark	6

Second round
Wisconsin–Stout	6
SE Oklahoma State	16
Auburn Montgomery	8
West Liberty State	4
Grand Canyon	9
Lewis–Clark State	13
Saint Francis (IL)	12
Saint Rose	2
Consolation Second Round
Grand Canyon	4
Dallas Baptist	1
Wisconsin–Stout	4
Saint Rose	6

Third round
SE Oklahoma State	8
Auburn Montgomery	0
Lewis–Clark State	8
Saint Francis (IL)	9
Consolation Third Round (both teams to Semifinals)
Auburn Montgomery	7
Grand Canyon	4
Lewis–Clark State	11
Saint Rose	3

Fourth round (both teams to Semifinals)
SE Oklahoma State	8
Saint Francis (IL)	10

=== Championship bracket ===
Semifinals
Saint Francis (IL)	2	3
Auburn Montgomery	4	4
SE Oklahoma State	3
Lewis–Clark State	5

Championship
Auburn Montgomery	4
Lewis–Clark State	9

== See also ==
- 1990 NCAA Division I baseball tournament
- 1990 NCAA Division II baseball tournament
- 1990 NCAA Division III baseball tournament
- 1990 NAIA Softball World Series
