= 1986 Southland Conference softball tournament =

- Teams: 7
- Format: Double-elimination tournament
- Finals site: Allan Saxe Field; Arlington, Texas
- Champions: Northeast Louisiana (2nd title)
- Winning coach: Rosemary Holloway–Hill (2nd title)

1986 Southland Conference softball standings
	Conf.				Overall
Team	W		L	PCT	W		L	PCT
Southwestern Louisiana ‍†‍‍	10	–	2	.833	30	–	19	.612
Texas–Arlington ‍‍‍	10	–	2	.833	25	–	25	.500
Lamar ‍‍‍	8	–	4	.667	16	–	19	.457
McNeese State ‍‍‍	6	–	6	.500	19	–	24	.442
North Texas ‍‍‍	5	–	7	.417	9	–	25	.265
Northeast Louisiana ‍‍‡‍	3	–	9	.250	17	–	32	.347
Arkansas State ‍‍‍	0	–	12	.000	3	–	28	.097
† – Conference champion ‡ – Tournament champion y – Invited to the NCAA tournament As of May 20, 1986; Rankings from Coaches' Poll

The 1986 Southland Conference tournament was held at Allan Saxe Field in Arlington, Texas on the Texas-Arlington campus. Northeast Louisiana won the seven team tournament. The Indians season ended with the tournament championship as they were not selected to the compete in the 1986 NCAA Division I softball tournament.

== Format ==
The tournament was a 7 team double elimination format. All teams which competed in conference play were members of the tournament field. Regular season champion, Southwestern Louisiana, received a first round bye.

== Tournament ==
Round	Game	Matchup	Score	Notes
First round
1	1	McNeese State vs. North Texas State	2–1	McNeese State wins
1	2	Northeast Louisiana vs. Lamar	5–3	Northeast Louisiana wins
1	3	Texas-Arlington vs. Arkansas State	11–0	Texas-Arlington wins
Winner's Bracket
2	4	Southwestern Louisiana vs. McNeese State	2–0	Southwestern Louisiana wins
2	5	Northeast Louisiana vs. Texas-Arlington	2–0	Northeast Louisiana wins
Consolation Bracket
3	6	Lamar vs. Arkansas State	8–1	Arkansas State eliminated
3	7	McNeese State vs. Lamar	5–0	Lamar eliminated
3	8	North Texas State vs. Texas-Arlington	1–0	Texas-Arlington eliminated
3	9	McNeese State vs. North Texas State	1–0	North Texas State eliminated
Semifinals
4	10	Northeast Louisiana vs. Southwestern Louisiana	2–1	Northeast Louisiana wins
4	11	Southwestern Louisiana vs. McNeese State	3–1	McNeese State eliminated
Championship
5	12	Southwestern Louisiana vs. Northeast Louisiana	4–2	Southwestern Louisiana wins game one.
5	13	Northeast Louisiana vs. Southwestern Louisiana	2–1	Northeast Louisiana wins championship.
