= 1990 NCAA Division II softball tournament =

- Format: Double-elimination tournament
- Finals site: Midland, Michigan
- Champions: Cal State Bakersfield (3rd title)
- Runner-up: Cal State Northridge (7th title game)
- Winning coach: Kathy Welter (3rd title)
- Attendance: 2,595

The 1990 NCAA Division II softball tournament was the ninth annual postseason tournament hosted by the NCAA to determine the national champion of softball among its Division II members in the United States, held at the end of the 1990 NCAA Division II softball season.

The final, four-team double elimination tournament, also known as the Division II Women's College World Series, was played in Midland, Michigan.

Two-time defending champions Cal State Bakersfield emerged from the consolation bracket and defeated Cal State Northridge in both elimination games of the championship series, 1–0 and 6–2, to capture the Roadrunners' third Division II national title.

== Bracket ==
=== Finals ===
First Round
Bloomsburg	2
Cal State Bakersfield	8
Missouri Southern State	2
Cal State Northridge	4
Bloomsburg	4
Missouri Southern State	3
Consolation bracket

Semifinals
Cal State Bakersfield	2
Cal State Northridge	3
Cal State Bakersfield	4
Bloomsburg	0

Championship
Cal State Northridge	0	2
Cal State Bakersfield	1	6

== All-tournament team ==
- Dara Ferris, 1B, Cal State Bakersfield
- Julie Wolfe, 2B, Bloomsburg
- Lisa Uranday, SS, Cal State Bakersfield
- Michelle Gerry, 3B, Cal State Bakersfield
- Erin McGuire, OF, Cal State Northridge
- Tanya Warren, OF, Cal State Bakersfield
- Lisa Erickson, OF, Cal State Northridge
- Debbie Dickmann, P, Cal State Northridge
- Cathy Lewis, P, Cal State Bakersfield
- Leean Couch, C, Cal State Bakersfield
- Jennifer Burken, DP, Missouri Southern State

== See also ==
- 1990 NCAA Division I softball tournament
- 1990 NCAA Division III softball tournament
- 1990 NAIA softball tournament
- 1990 NCAA Division II baseball tournament
