= 1989 NCAA Division I softball tournament =

- Teams: 20
- Finals site: Twin Creeks Sports Complex; Sunnyvale, California
- Champions: UCLA (5th (6th overall) title)
- Runner-up: Fresno State (5th WCWS Appearance)
- Winning coach: Sharron Backus & Sue Enquist (5th (6th overall) & 1st title)
- Attendance: 14448

The 1989 NCAA Division I softball tournament was the eighth annual tournament to determine the national champion of NCAA women's collegiate softball. Held during May 1989, twenty Division I college softball teams contested the championship. The tournament featured eight regionals of either two or three teams, each in a double elimination format. The 1989 Women's College World Series was held in Sunnyvale, California from May 24 through May 28 and marked the conclusion of the 1989 NCAA Division I softball season. For the second consecutive year, UCLA won the championship by defeating Fresno State 1–0 in the final game.

This was the last WCWS before it moved to its current home in Oklahoma City, Oklahoma.

== Regionals ==
=== Regional No. 1 ===
Team		G1	G2	G3
–	UCLA	5	3	–
–	Long Beach State	1	0	–

- UCLA qualifies for WCWS, 2–0

=== Regional No. 2 ===
Team		G1	G2	G3
–	Oklahoma State	2	3	–
–	Wichita State	0	1	–

- Oklahoma State qualifies for WCWS, 2–0

=== Regional No. 3 ===
Team		G1	G2	G3
–	Fresno State	1^{10}	6	–
–	California	0	0	–

- Fresno State qualifies for WCWS, 2–0

=== Regional No. 4 ===
Team		G1	G2	G3
–	Cal Poly Pomona	1^{10}	4	–
–	Cal State Fullerton	0	1	–

- Cal Poly Pomona qualifies for WCWS, 2–0

=== Regional No. 5 ===
==== First elimination round ====
- Connecticut 1, Massachusetts 0
- Oregon 2, Massachusetts 0
- Connecticut 2, Oregon 1

==== Second elimination round ====
Team		G1	G2
–	Connecticut	2	0
–	Oregon	3^{10}	6

- Oregon qualifies for WCWS, 3–1

=== Regional No. 6 ===
==== First elimination round ====
- Arizona State 2, Utah State 0
- Arizona 8, Utah State 3
- Arizona 3, Arizona State 2 (10 innings)

==== Second elimination round ====
Team		G1	G2
–	Arizona	4	–
–	Arizona State	0	–

- Arizona qualifies for WCWS, 3–0

=== Regional No. 7 ===
==== First elimination round ====
- Creighton 6, Toledo 0
- Toledo 1, Iowa 0
- Creighton 6, Iowa 1

==== Second elimination round ====
Team		G1	G2
–	Creighton	2	1
–	Toledo	8	3

- Toledo qualifies for WCWS, 3–1

=== Regional No. 8 ===
==== First elimination round ====
- South Carolina 2, Florida State 1 (10 innings)
- Louisiana Tech 3, Florida State 1
- South Carolina 3, Louisiana Tech 1

==== Second elimination round ====
Team		G1	G2
–	South Carolina	0	8
–	Louisiana Tech	1^{9}	2

- South Carolina qualifies for WCWS, 3–1

== Women's College World Series ==
=== Participants ===
- Arizona
- Cal Poly Pomona
- Fresno State
- Oklahoma State
- Oregon
- South Carolina
- Toledo
- UCLA

=== Game results ===
==== Bracket ====
Upper round 1
UCLA	3
South Carolina	0
Cal Poly Pomona	1
Oregon	0
Arizona	12^{5}
Fresno State	0
Oklahoma State	3
Toledo	1

Upper round 2
UCLA	9
Cal Poly Pomona	0
Arizona	0
Oklahoma State	4^{8}
Lower round 1
South Carolina	0
Oregon	1
Fresno State	3
Toledo	0

Upper final
UCLA	2
Oklahoma State	1
Lower round 2
Arizona	4
Oregon	0
Cal Poly Pomona	1
Fresno State	5

Semifinals
UCLA	3
Arizona	0
Oklahoma State	0
Fresno State	7

Final
UCLA	1
Fresno State	0

=== Championship Game ===
School	Top Batter	Stats.
UCLA Bruins	Lorraine Maynez (CF)	1-3 RBI 2B
Fresno State Bulldogs	Shelly Stokes (C)	1-2 BB

School	Pitcher	IP	H	R	ER	BB	SO	AB	BF
UCLA Bruins	Tiffany Boyd (W)	7.0	3	0	0	1	6	24	25
Fresno State Bulldogs	Carie Dever (L)	6.0	5	1	1	0	1	22	23

=== All-Tournament Team ===
The following players were named to the All-Tournament Team

Pos	Name	School
P	Carie Dever	Fresno State
P	Tiffany Boyd	UCLA
1B	Kerry Dienelt	UCLA
2B	Missy Phillips	UCLA
3B	Janice Parks	UCLA
SS	Martha Noffsinger	Fresno State
OF	Lorraine Maynez	UCLA
OF	Kristin Gauthier	Arizona
OF	Jill Polanco	Fresno State
C	Shelly Stokes	Fresno State
AL	Nicki Dennis	Arizona
AL	Michele Smith	Oklahoma State

== See also ==
- 1989 NCAA Division II softball tournament
- 1989 NCAA Division III softball tournament
- 1989 NAIA softball tournament
- 1989 NCAA Division I baseball tournament
