= 1990 NCAA Division I softball tournament =

- Teams: 20
- Finals site: ASA Hall of Fame Stadium; Oklahoma City, Oklahoma
- Champions: UCLA (6th (7th overall) title)
- Runner-up: Fresno State (6th WCWS Appearance)
- Winning coach: Sharron Backus & Sue Enquist (6th (7th overall) & 2nd title)
- Attendance: 19349

The 1990 NCAA Division I softball tournament was the ninth annual tournament to determine the national champion of NCAA women's collegiate softball. Held during May 1990, twenty Division I college softball teams contested the championship. The tournament featured eight regionals of either two or three teams, each in a double elimination format. The 1990 Women's College World Series was held in Oklahoma City, Oklahoma from May 23 through May 28 and marked the conclusion of the 1990 NCAA Division I softball season. For the third consecutive year, UCLA won the championship by defeating Fresno State 2–0 in the final game.

== Regionals ==
=== Regional No. 1 ===
Team		G1	G2	G3
–	UCLA	2	4	–
–	Northern Iowa	0	0	–

- UCLA qualifies for WCWS, 2–0

=== Regional No. 2 ===
Team		G1	G2	G3
–	Fresno State	11^{6}	2	–
–	Creighton	1	1	–

- Fresno State qualifies for WCWS, 2–0

=== Regional No. 3 ===
Team		G1	G2	G3
–	Arizona State	1	0	5
–	Arizona	0	1	9

- Arizona qualifies for WCWS, 2–1

=== Regional No. 4 ===
Team		G1	G2	G3
–	Cal State Fullerton	3^{8}	0	1
–	Long Beach State	2	4	2^{16}

- Long Beach State qualifies for WCWS, 2–1

=== Regional No. 5 ===
==== First elimination round ====
- UNLV 2, San Jose State 1
- California 2, San Jose State 1
- UNLV 1, California 0

==== Second elimination round ====
Team		G1	G2
–	UNLV	0	1
–	California	1	0

- UNLV qualifies for WCWS, 3–1

=== Regional No. 6 ===
==== First elimination round ====
- Adelphi 1, Connecticut 0 (20 innings)
- Oklahoma State 5, Connecticut 0
- Oklahoma State 1, Adelphi 0

==== Second elimination round ====
Team		G1	G2
–	Oklahoma State	3	—
–	Adelphi	0	–

- Oklahoma State qualifies for WCWS, 3–0

=== Regional No. 7 ===
==== First elimination round ====
- Florida State 5, Texas A&M 0
- Southwestern Louisiana 1, Texas A&M 0
- Florida State 4, Southwestern Louisiana 3

==== Second elimination round ====
Team		G1	G2
–	Florida State	2^{10}	—
–	Southwestern Louisiana	1	–

- Florida State qualifies for WCWS, 3–0

=== Regional No. 8 ===
==== First elimination round ====
- Kent State 4, Ohio State 0
- Ohio State 2, Oregon 0
- Kent State 3, Oregon 0

==== Second elimination round ====
Team		G1	G2
–	Kent State	5	—
–	Ohio State	3	–

- Kent State qualifies for WCWS, 3–0

== Women's College World Series ==
=== Participants ===
- Arizona
- Florida State
- Fresno State
- Kent State
- Long Beach State
- Oklahoma State
- UCLA
- UNLV

=== Game results ===
==== Bracket ====
Upper round 1
UCLA	4
Kent State	0
Long Beach State	2
UNLV	0
Oklahoma State	3
Arizona	0
Florida State	1
Fresno State	0

Upper round 2
UCLA	6
Long Beach State	0
Oklahoma State	4
Florida State	1
Lower round 1
UNLV	5
Kent State	2
Fresno State	1
Arizona	0

Upper final
UCLA	2
Oklahoma State	1
Lower round 2
Florida State	4
UNLV	1
Long Beach State	0
Fresno State	2

Semifinals
UCLA	3
Florida State	0
Oklahoma State	0
Fresno State	1^{10}

Final
UCLA	0	17
Fresno State	2	0

=== Championship Game ===
School	Top Batter	Stats.
UCLA Bruins	Kerry Dienelt (1B)	2-3 RBI
Fresno State Bulldogs	Kerri Donis (1B)	1-2

School	Pitcher	IP	H	R	ER	BB	SO	AB
UCLA Bruins	Heather Compton (W)	7.0	1	0	0	0	5	22
Fresno State Bulldogs	Terry Carpenter (L)	0.0	2	1	0	0	0	1
Fresno State Bulldogs	Carie Dever	4.0	3	1	1	1	2	14
Fresno State Bulldogs	Marcie Green	2.0	1	0	0	1	0	7

=== All-Tournament Team ===
The following players were named to the All-Tournament Team

Pos	Name	School
P	Lisa Longaker	UCLA
P	Marcie Green	Fresno State
1B	Kerry Dienelt	UCLA
2B	Dawn Lange	Oklahoma State
3B	Lisa Fernandez	UCLA
SS	Martha Noffsinger	Fresno State
OF	Shanna Flynn	UCLA
OF	Yvonne Gutierrez	UCLA
OF	Leslie Barton	Florida State
C	Shannon Kimberling	Oklahoma State
AL	Julie Smith	Fresno State
AL	Debbie DeJohn	Florida State

== See also ==
- 1990 NCAA Division II softball tournament
- 1990 NCAA Division III softball tournament
- 1990 NAIA softball tournament
- 1990 NCAA Division I baseball tournament
