= Judi Garman =

College softball coach

Biographical details
- Born: March 27, 1944 (age 82); Harrisburg, Pennsylvania, U.S.

Coaching career (HC unless noted)
- 1972–1979: Golden West
- 1980–1999: Cal State Fullerton

Head coaching record
- Overall: 1,124–414–4 (.730)

Accomplishments and honors

Championships
- 4× NJCAA (1975–1978); Women's College World Series (1986); 5× WCAA (1981–1985); 3× PCAA/Big West regular season (1986, 1987, 1993)

Judith Fay Garman (born March 27, 1944) is an American former college softball coach. She was the head softball coach at Cal State Fullerton from 1980 to 1999 and led Fullerton to the 1986 Women's College World Series championship. Before coaching at Fullerton, she was the head coach at Golden West College from 1972 to 1979 and led that school's softball team to four consecutive national junior college softball championships from 1976 to 1979. When Garman retired in 1999, she was the most successful coach in college softball history.

== Early years ==
Garman was born in Harrisburg, Pennsylvania, the daughter of a Mennonite minister. As a child, she moved with her family to Kindersley, Saskatchewan, when her father was assigned as the pastor of a small town on the Canadian prairie. Garman played softball and ran track as a girl. She later recalled, "I didn't know it at the time, but growing up where I did was probably the best thing that could have happened to me. It wasn't until later that I found out that in most places girls weren't encouraged to play sports. But where I grew up, and in the family I grew up in, there wasn't much else to do. If I'd grown up in the United States, I might not have become an athlete or a coach."

Garman graduated from the University of Saskatchewan in 1966 and played for two years on the Canadian women's national softball team. She later moved to California and received a master's degree from UC Santa Barbara in 1970.

== Golden West College ==
Garman began her head coaching career at Golden West College in Huntington Beach, California. While at Golden West, Garman supervised the construction of a softball complex that was considered one of the best in Southern California. From 1972 to 1979, Garman led the Golden West Rustlers to a record of 211 wins and 40 losses, and won four consecutive national junior college championships from 1975 to 1978.

== Cal State Fullerton ==
In July 1979, Garman was hired as the first softball coach at California State University, Fullerton. Fullerton played its first softball season in 1980 with limited facilities. Garman later recalled that the hardest part about the move was "leaving the beautiful facilities we had built at Golden West and coming over here to start with absolutely nothing." She noted that, in the first season at Fullerton, the right fielder had to learn how to play the sidewalk in front of her, the equipment was stored in a men's room, and "our electrical source for a pitching machine was an extension cord thrown out the window of the carpentry shop." The 1980 team played home games on three different fields, and Garman was responsible for transporting the equipment and concession supplies to the field in the back of her truck. A friend presented her players with homemade buttons that read, "Garman's Gypsies."

Despite the limited facilities, Garman quickly built one of the most successful softball programs in the United States. Between 1981 and 1988, she led Fullerton to eight consecutive 50-win seasons, including 59 wins in 1987, 57 wins in 1986, and 56 wins in 1983. She led Cal State Fullerton to the Women's College World Series championship in 1986. She also led the Titans to four earlier trips to the College World Series, resulting in two second-place and two third-place finishes.

Garman retired as Fullerton's softball coach after the 1999 season. She was only 55 years old at the time of her retirement and told the Orange County Register that the breast cancer death of her close friend Vicky Larson, a former coach and girls athletic director at Loara High School, was a major factor in her decision. Garman noted, "There's a lot I still want to do in my life while I'm healthy. This job has become seven days a week, 15 hours a day. I can't keep up that pace anymore."

Garman compiled a career record of 913–374–4 at Cal State Fullerton.

== International coaching ==
Garman returned to coaching in 2001 as the head coach of the Italian national softball team. She led Italy to the European Championship and a fifth-place finish at the 2002 ISF Women's World Championship.

== Coaching records and Hall of Fame ==
In March 1996, Garman became the first college softball coach to win 1,000 games (including 211 wins at Golden West) with a 1–0 win over Long Beach State.

With 1,1249 wins in 28 years (913 at the Division I level), Garman was the winningest coach in college softball history at the time of her retirement. Other coaches later surpassed that record, including Margie Wright and Mike Candrea.

Garman was inducted into the National Fastpitch Coaches Association Hall of Fame in 1993.

Garman has also written a book, Softball Skills & Drills.

== See also ==
- National Fastpitch Coaches Association Hall of Fame
