= Anderson Family Field =

Softball stadium

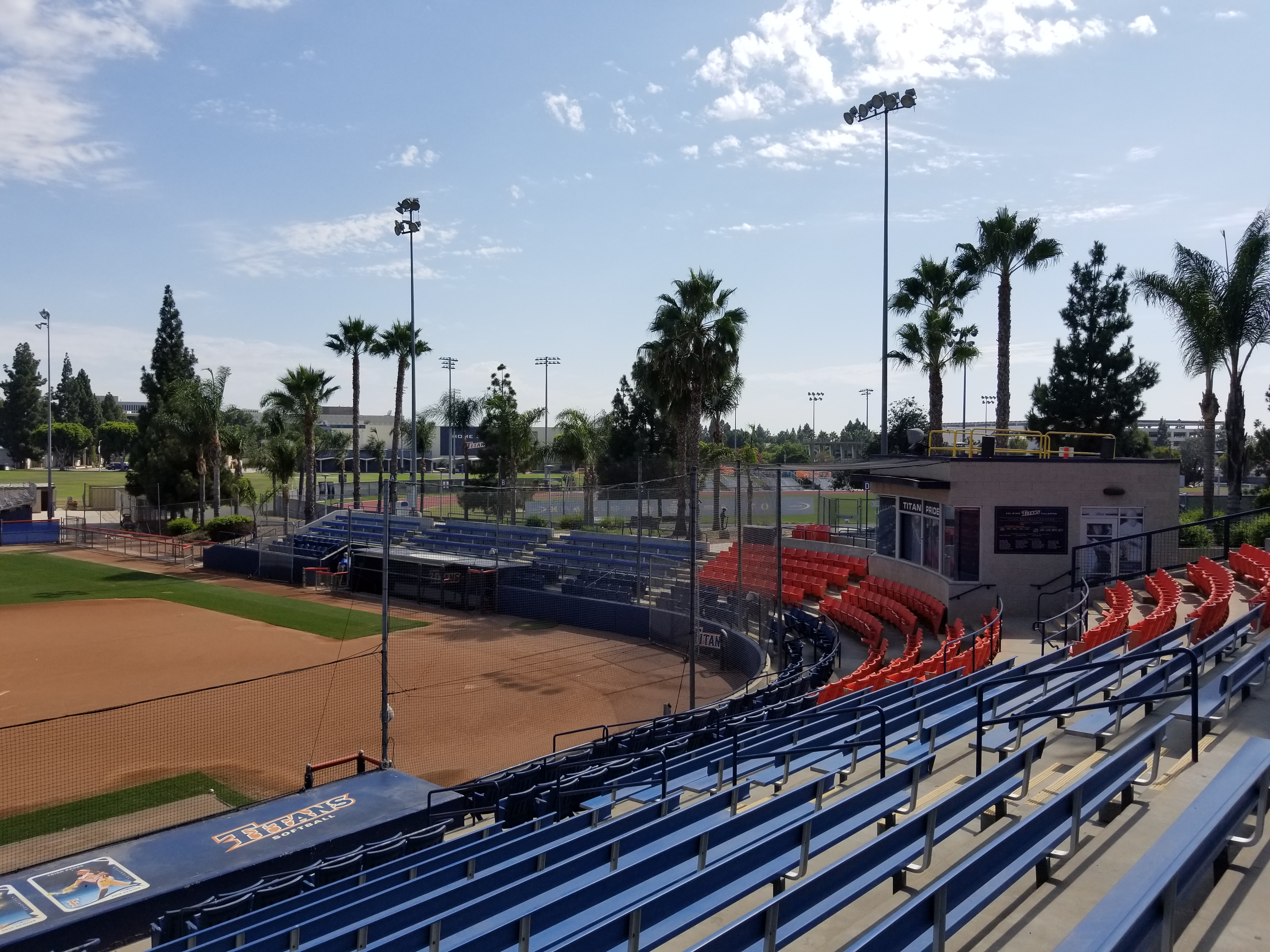
- Interactive map of Anderson Family Field
- Location: Fullerton, California; United States
- Coordinates: 33.886018°N 117.885333°W
- Capacity: 1,000
- Surface: Natural grass
- Field size: 190' LF, 220' CF, 190' RF

Construction
- Opened: 1985

Tenants
- Cal State Fullerton Titans softball - (NCAA); 1985 – present

Anderson Family Field is a college softball stadium on the campus of the California State University, Fullerton. It is the home venue of the Cal State Fullerton Titans softball team. It is named for four members of the Anderson family, who donated funds to update the stadium.

The stadium has been renovated three times: in 1992, 1995, and 2000. A fourth major renovation is in progress as of 2021.
