= UNLV Rebels softball =

UNLV Rebels
- University: University of Nevada, Las Vegas
- Head coach: Kristie Fox (9th season)
- Conference: Mountain West
- Location: Paradise, Nevada, US
- Home stadium: Eller Media Stadium
- Nickname: Rebels
- Colors: Scarlet and gray

NCAA WCWS appearances
- 1990, 1991, 1995

The UNLV Rebels softball is the team which represents the University of Nevada, Las Vegas in NCAA Division I college softball. The team participates in the Mountain West Conference. The Rebels are currently led by their head coach Kristie Fox. The team plays its home games at Eller Media Stadium located on the university's campus.

== Year-by-year results ==
| Season | Conference | Coach | Overall | | | | Conference | | | | Notes |
| Season | Conference | Coach | Games | Win | Loss | Tie | Games | Win | Loss | Tie | Notes |
|---|---|---|---|---|---|---|---|---|---|---|---|
| 2000 | Mountain West | | 61 | 20 | 41 | 0 | 22 | 5 | 17 | 0 | |
| 2001 | Mountain West | | 56 | 26 | 30 | 0 | 20 | 7 | 13 | 0 | |
| 2002 | Mountain West | | 64 | 29 | 35 | 0 | 0 | 0 | 0 | 0 | |
| 2003 | Mountain West | | 60 | 21 | 39 | 0 | 18 | 4 | 14 | 0 | |
| 2004 | Mountain West | | 60 | 25 | 35 | 0 | 20 | 7 | 13 | 0 | |
| 2005 | Mountain West | | 63 | 44 | 19 | 0 | 20 | 17 | 3 | 0 | |
| 2006 | Mountain West | | 63 | 26 | 37 | 0 | 20 | 8 | 12 | 0 | |
| 2007 | Mountain West | | 64 | 37 | 27 | 0 | 20 | 12 | 8 | 0 | |
| 2008 | Mountain West | | 66 | 25 | 40 | 1 | 20 | 5 | 15 | 0 | |
| 2009 | Mountain West | | 52 | 31 | 21 | 0 | 0 | 0 | 0 | 0 | |
| 2010 | Mountain West | | 53 | 33 | 20 | 0 | 15 | 10 | 5 | 0 | |
| 2011 | Mountain West | | 45 | 27 | 18 | 0 | 14 | 9 | 5 | 0 | |
| 2012 | Mountain West | | 49 | 22 | 27 | 0 | 12 | 3 | 9 | 0 | |
| 2013 | Mountain West | Lisa Dodd | 52 | 21 | 31 | 0 | 18 | 7 | 11 | 0 | |
| 2014 | Mountain West | | 54 | 26 | 28 | 0 | 24 | 15 | 9 | 0 | |
| 2015 | Mountain West | | 55 | 25 | 30 | 0 | 24 | 11 | 13 | 0 | |
| 2016 | Mountain West | | 55 | 24 | 31 | 0 | 24 | 8 | 16 | 0 | |
| 2017 | Mountain West | | 52 | 25 | 27 | 0 | 24 | 8 | 16 | 0 | |
| 2018 | Mountain West | Kristie Fox | 53 | 33 | 20 | 0 | 24 | 13 | 11 | 0 | |
| 2019 | Mountain West | Kristie Fox | 50 | 36 | 14 | 0 | 23 | 14 | 9 | 0 | |

== Roster ==
As of March 10, 2018.

2018 Softball Roster

2018 Softball
NO. NAME HT POS CL (EXP)

25 Bondi, Reina 5-2 OF SO (1L)

55 Bueno, Myranda 5-6 OF JR (2L)

00 Burke, Breana 5-4 P/OF SO (1L)

2 Candelas, Jaclyn 5-3 OF FR (HS)

27 Cazares, Lesly 5-2 2B, 3B, SS FR (HS)

24 Diaz, Samantha 5-8 SS/3B FR (HS)

7 Federe, Justine 5-2 IN SO (1L)

11 Harrison, Kiley 5-8 C/IN JR (1L)

1 Howard, Abby 5-6 C/OF JR (1L)

23 Marshall, Devynn 5-6 IN/P FR (HS)

12 Masterson, Charlie 5-8 P/IN SO (1L)

5 Navarro, Alyssa 5-5 IN SR (1L)

45 Petmecky, Janine 5-5 P/OF SR (3L)

33 Quiroz-Montano, Vivian 5-4 C FR (HS)

20 Stover, Brooke 5-8 C SR (3L)

15 Trejo, Mia 5-11 IN/P FR (HS)

17 Vela, Emily 5-2 IF SO (1L)

10 Yadao-Valdez, Jadelyn 4-9 UTL SR (3L)

== See also ==
- List of NCAA Division I softball programs
