= Cal State Fullerton Titans softball =

Cal State Fullerton Titans
- Founded: 1980
- University: California State University, Fullerton
- Athletic director: Jim Donovan
- Head coach: Gina Oaks Garcia (1st season)
- Conference: Big West
- Location: Fullerton, California
- Home stadium: Anderson Family Field (capacity: 1,000)
- Nickname: Titans
- Colors: Navy blue, white, and orange

NCAA Tournament champions
- 1986

NCAA WCWS runner-up
- 1983

NCAA WCWS appearances
- 1982, 1983, 1985, 1986, 1987, 1995

AIAW WCWS appearances
- 1980, 1981

NCAA super regional appearances
- 2007

NCAA Tournament appearances
- 1982, 1983, 1984, 1985, 1986, 1987, 1988, 1989, 1990, 1991, 1992, 1993, 1994, 1995, 1996, 1999, 2000, 2001, 2002, 2003, 2005, 2006, 2007, 2008, 2009, 2016, 2017, 2018, 2019, 2022, 2023, 2024, 2026

Conference tournament championships
- 2026

Regular-season conference championships
- WCAA: 1981, 1982, 1983, 1984, 1985, 1986; Big West: 1987, 1993, 2000, 2001, 2002, 2003, 2006, 2016, 2017, 2018, 2019, 2022, 2024, 2025, 2026

The Cal State Fullerton Titans softball team represents California State University, Fullerton in NCAA Division I college softball.

== History ==
The Titans have claimed one national championship, in 1986, along with a runner-up finish in 1983, as part of six total appearances in the NCAA Women's College World Series. Cal State Fullerton also appeared in two Women's College World Series when the event was sponsored by the Association for Intercollegiate Athletics for Women. The team plays home games at Anderson Family Field, a one-thousand seat venue built on campus in 1985, and plays as part of the Big West Conference. The Titans were most recently led by head coach Kelly Ford. During her 12 seasons at Cal State she led the Titans to six Big West titles, seven NCAA tournament appearances and five Big West Coach of the Year honors.

== Awards and honors ==
=== National awards ===
NFCA Golden Shoe Award

- Megan Delgadillo (2024)
