= List of Arizona State Sun Devils softball seasons =

The following is a list of Arizona State Sun Devils softball seasons. Arizona State University is a member of the Big 12 Conference of the NCAA Division I. The Sun Devils are four time Women's College World Series champions, with two of those titles coming during the AIAW years and the remaining two under NCAA organization. Arizona State has also appeared in the final event 19 times - 7 under the AIAW and 12 under the NCAA. The team played its first season in 1967.

National champions	WCWS Appearance	NCAA Tournament appearance	Conference champions

Season	Head coach	Conference	Season results									Postseason result
Season	Head coach	Conference	Overall				Conference					Postseason result
Season	Head coach	Conference	Wins	Losses	Ties	%	Wins	Losses	Ties	%	Finish	Postseason result
1967	Mary Littlewood	Independent	5	1	0	.833	N/A					—
1968	No records											
1969	No records											
1970	Mary Littlewood	Independent	10	2	0	.833	N/A					—
1971	Mary Littlewood	Independent	12	3	0	.800	N/A					WCWS, Fourth Place
1972	Mary Littlewood	Independent	13	2	0	.867	N/A					National Champions
1973	Mary Littlewood	Independent	13	2	0	.867	N/A					National Champions
1974	Mary Littlewood	Independent	8	4	0	.667	N/A					—
1975	Mary Littlewood	Intermountain	15	3	0	.833	9	2	0	.818	2nd	AIAW Regionals
1976	Mary Littlewood	Intermountain	22	7	0	.759	13	4	0	.765	3rd	WCWS, Fourth Place
1977	Mary Littlewood	Intermountain	26	7	0	.788	13	1	0	.929	1st	WCWS, Fourth Place
1978	Mary Littlewood	Intermountain	29	5	0	.853	13	3	0	.813	1st	WCWS, Ninth Place
1979	Mary Littlewood	Intermountain	28	7	0	.800	10	0	0	.588	3rd	WCWS, Ninth Place
1980	Mary Littlewood	WCAA	33	11	0	.750	15	3	0	.833	1st	Regionals
1981	Mary Littlewood	WCAA	35	17	0	.673	6	6	0	.500	3rd	Regionals
1982	Mary Littlewood	WCAA	34	18	0	.654	11	9	0	.550	3rd	WCWS, Fourth Place
1983	Mary Littlewood	WCAA	22	19	1	.536	9	12	1	.432	3rd	—
1984	Mary Littlewood	WCAA	33	15	0	.688	6	4	0	.600	3rd	Regionals
1985	Mary Littlewood	WCAA	38	17	0	.691	6	6	0	.500	3rd	Regionals
1986	Mary Littlewood	Pac-12	32	17	0	.653	7	4	0	.636	2nd	Regionals
1987	Mary Littlewood	Pac-12	41	15	0	.732	6	4	0	.600	4th	WCWS, Seventh Place
1988	Mary Littlewood	Pac-12	26	25	0	.510	8	12	0	.400	4th	—
1989	Mary Littlewood	Pac-12	34	26	0	.567	7	13	0	.350	5th	Regionals
1990	Linda Wells	Pac-12	43	32	0	.573	10	10	0	.500	5th	Regionals
1991	Linda Wells	Pac-12	43	18	0	.705	15	5	0	.750	2nd	Regionals
1992	Linda Wells	Pac-12	27	21	0	.563	7	9	0	.438	4th	—
1993	Linda Wells	Pac-12	34	26	0	.567	13	11	0	.542	3rd	Regionals
1994	Linda Wells	Pac-12	22	41	0	.349	7	17	0	.292	6th	—
1995	Linda Wells	Pac-12	29	26	0	.527	10	18	0	.357	6th	—
1996	Linda Wells	Pac-12	34	27	0	.557	10	18	0	.357	5th	—
1997	Linda Wells	Pac-12	32	25	0	.561	9	19	0	.321	6th	Regionals
1998	Linda Wells	Pac-12	38	27	0	.585	9	19	0	.321	6th	Regionals
1999	Linda Wells	Pac-12	41	28	0	.594	8	20	0	.286	8th	WCWS, Seventh Place
2000	Linda Wells	Pac-12	43	20	0	.683	8	13	0	.381	5th	Regionals
2001	Linda Wells	Pac-12	36	22	0	.621	9	12	0	.429	6th	Regionals
2002	Linda Wells	Pac-12	46	20	0	.697	10	11	0	.476	5th	WCWS, Third Place
2003	Linda Wells	Pac-12	32	25	0	.561	7	14	0	.333	7th	Regionals
2004	Linda Wells	Pac-12	33	31	0	.516	3	17	0	.150	8th	—
2005	Linda Wells	Pac-12	30	26	0	.536	4	17	0	.190	8th	Regionals
2006	Clint Myers	Pac-12	53	15	0	.779	11	10	0	.524	4th	WCWS, Fifth Place
2007	Clint Myers	Pac-12	54	17	0	.761	13	8	0	.619	2nd	WCWS, Seventh Place
2008	Clint Myers	Pac-12	66	5	0	.930	18	3	0	.857	1st	WCWS, National Champions
2009	Clint Myers	Pac-12	47	19	0	.712	10	11	0	.476	6th	WCWS, Fifth Place
2010	Clint Myers	Pac-12	44	17	0	.721	10	11	0	.476	4th	Super Regionals
2011	Clint Myers	Pac-12	60	6	0	.909	17	4	0	.810	1st	WCWS, National Champions
2012	Clint Myers	Pac-12	53	11	0	.828	18	4	0	.818	2nd	WCWS, Fourth Place
2013	Clint Myers	Pac-12	50	12	0	.806	16	8	0	.667	T-2nd	WCWS, Seventh Place
2014	Craig Nicholson	Pac-12	46	12	1	.788	15	7	1	.674	3rd	Regionals
2015	Craig Nicholson	Pac-12	36	22	0	.621	12	11	0	.522	T-4th	Regionals
2016	Robert Wagner & Lefty Olivarez	Pac-12	32	26	0	.552	6	17	0	.261	8th	Regionals
2017	Trisha Ford	Pac-12	31	22	0	.585	9	15	0	.375	6th	Regionals
2018	Trisha Ford	Pac-12	48	13	0	.787	16	8	0	.667	3rd	WCWS, Seventh Place
2019	Trisha Ford	Pac-12	35	20	0	.636	13	11	0	.542	4th	Regionals
2020	Trisha Ford	Pac-12	22	7	0	.759	Season cancelled due to COVID-19 pandemic					
2021	Trisha Ford	Pac-12	33	16	0	.673	12	9	0	.571	4th	Regionals
2022	Trisha Ford	Pac-12	43	11	0	.796	20	4	0	.833	1st	Super Regionals
2023	Megan Bartlett	Pac-12	22	26	0	.458	6	18	0	.250	T-8th	—
2024	Megan Bartlett	Pac-12	20	31	0	.392	3	21	0	.125	9th	—
2025	Megan Bartlett	Big 12	35	21	0	.625	14	10	0	.583	5th	Regionals
2026	Megan Bartlett	Big 12	45	18	0	.714	11	13	0	.458	6th	Super Regionals
