= List of Arizona Wildcats softball seasons =

The following is a list of Arizona Wildcats softball seasons. The University of Arizona is a member of the Big 12 Conference of the NCAA Division I. The Wildcats are eight time Women's College World Series champions, and are regarded as one of the top programs in college softball after winning eight championships in seventeen seasons, including a run of sixteen consecutive WCWS appearances. Arizona has also appeared in the final event 27 times - 4 under the AIAW and 23 under the NCAA. The team played its first season in 1974.

| National champions | WCWS Appearance | NCAA Tournament appearance | Conference champions |

| Season | Head coach | Conference | Season results | | | | | | | | | Postseason result |
| Season | Head coach | Conference | Overall | | | | Conference | | | | | Postseason result |
| Season | Head coach | Conference | Wins | Losses | Ties | % | Wins | Losses | Ties | % | Finish | Postseason result |
|---|---|---|---|---|---|---|---|---|---|---|---|---|
| 1974 | Judy Spray | Intermountain | 11 | 3 | 0 | .786 | — | — | — | — | — | WCWS, Seventh Place |
| 1975 | Judy Spray | Intermountain | 13 | 8 | 0 | .619 | — | — | — | — | — | WCWS, Seventh Place |
| 1976 | Judy Spray | Intermountain | 21 | 7 | 0 | .650 | — | — | — | — | — | |
| 1977 | Ginny Parrish | Intermountain | 22 | 14 | 0 | .611 | 6 | 2 | 0 | .750 | | WCWS Runner-up |
| 1978 | Ginny Parrish | Intermountain | 16 | 11 | 0 | .593 | 3 | 6 | 0 | .333 | | |
| 1979 | Ginny Parrish | Intermountain | 44 | 15 | 0 | .746 | 15 | 3 | 0 | .833 | | WCWS, Thirteenth place |
| 1980 | Rocky LaRose | WCAA | 23 | 23 | 0 | .500 | 2 | 14 | 0 | .125 | | |
| 1981 | Paula Noel | WCAA | 24 | 20 | 0 | .545 | 5 | 11 | 0 | .313 | | |
| 1982 | Paula Noel | WCAA | 21 | 20 | 0 | .512 | 6 | 14 | 0 | .300 | 4th | |
| 1983 | Paula Noel | WCAA | 20 | 24 | 0 | .455 | 7 | 12 | 0 | .368 | | |
| 1984 | Paula Noel | WCAA | 28 | 16 | 0 | .636 | 5 | 5 | 0 | .500 | 4th | |
| 1985 | Paula Noel | WCAA | 17 | 16 | 0 | .515 | 5 | 7 | 0 | .417 | 5th | |
| 1986 | Mike Candrea | Pac-12 | 27 | 13 | 1 | .671 | 5 | 6 | 1 | .458 | 3rd | |
| 1987 | Mike Candrea | Pac-12 | 42 | 18 | 0 | .700 | 6 | 4 | 0 | .600 | T-3rd | NCAA Regional |
| 1988 | Mike Candrea | Pac-12 | 54 | 18 | 0 | .750 | 15 | 5 | 0 | .750 | 2nd | WCWS, Third place |
| 1989 | Mike Candrea | Pac-12 | 48 | 19 | 0 | .716 | 11 | 9 | 0 | .550 | 3rd | WCWS, Third place |
| 1990 | Mike Candrea | Pac-12 | 49 | 17 | 0 | .742 | 12 | 6 | 0 | .667 | 2nd | WCWS, Seventh place |
| 1991 | Mike Candrea | Pac-12 | 56 | 16 | 0 | .778 | 11 | 9 | 0 | .550 | 4th | National Champions |
| 1992 | Mike Candrea | Pac-12 | 58 | 7 | 0 | .892 | 16 | 2 | 0 | .889 | 1st | WCWS, Runner-up |
| 1993 | Mike Candrea | Pac-12 | 44 | 8 | 0 | .846 | 15 | 3 | 0 | .833 | 2nd | National Champions |
| 1994 | Mike Candrea | Pac-12 | 64 | 3 | 0 | .955 | 21 | 3 | 0 | .875 | 1st | National Champions |
| 1995 | Mike Candrea | Pac-12 | 66 | 6 | 0 | .917 | 24 | 4 | 0 | .857 | 1st | WCWS, Runner-up |
| 1996 | Mike Candrea | Pac-12 | 58 | 9 | 0 | .866 | 23 | 5 | 0 | .821 | 2nd | National Champions |
| 1997 | Mike Candrea | Pac-12 | 61 | 5 | 0 | .924 | 26 | 1 | 0 | .963 | 1st | National Champions |
| 1998 | Mike Candrea | Pac-12 | 67 | 4 | 0 | .944 | 27 | 1 | 0 | .964 | 1st | WCWS, Runner-up |
| 1999 | Mike Candrea | Pac-12 | 53 | 16 | 0 | .768 | 19 | 9 | 0 | .679 | 2nd | WCWS, Fifth place |
| 2000 | Mike Candrea | Pac-12 | 59 | 9 | 0 | .868 | 16 | 4 | 0 | .800 | 2nd | WCWS, Third place |
| 2001 | Mike Candrea | Pac-12 | 65 | 4 | 0 | .942 | 19 | 2 | 0 | .905 | 1st | National Champions |
| 2002 | Mike Candrea | Pac-12 | 55 | 12 | 0 | .821 | 15 | 6 | 0 | .714 | 2nd | WCWS, Runner-up |
| 2003 | Mike Candrea | Pac-12 | 56 | 7 | 0 | .889 | 19 | 2 | 0 | .905 | 1st | WCWS, Third place |
| 2004 | Larry Ray | Pac-12 | 55 | 6 | 0 | .902 | 17 | 3 | 0 | .850 | 1st | NCAA Regional |
| 2005 | Mike Candrea | Pac-12 | 45 | 12 | 0 | .789 | 13 | 8 | 0 | .619 | 1st | WCWS, Fifth place |
| 2006 | Mike Candrea | Pac-12 | 54 | 11 | 0 | .831 | 15 | 6 | 0 | .714 | 2nd | National Champions |
| 2007 | Mike Candrea | Pac-12 | 50 | 14 | 1 | .777 | 15 | 5 | 1 | .738 | 1st | National Champions |
| 2008 | Larry Ray | Pac-12 | 41 | 19 | 0 | .683 | 13 | 8 | 0 | .619 | | WCWS, Seventh place |
| 2009 | Mike Candrea | Pac-12 | 46 | 17 | 0 | .730 | 13 | 7 | 0 | .650 | 3rd | WCWS, Seventh place |
| 2010 | Mike Candrea | Pac-12 | 52 | 14 | 0 | .788 | 13 | 8 | 0 | .619 | 3rd | WCWS, Runner-up |
| 2011 | Mike Candrea | Pac-12 | 43 | 18 | 0 | .705 | 11 | 10 | 0 | .524 | 3rd | NCAA Super Regional |
| 2012 | Mike Candrea | Pac-12 | 38 | 19 | 0 | .667 | 12 | 12 | 0 | .500 | 4th | NCAA Super Regional |
| 2013 | Mike Candrea | Pac-12 | 33 | 26 | 0 | .559 | 9 | 15 | 0 | .375 | 7th | NCAA Regional |
| 2014 | Mike Candrea | Pac-12 | 44 | 16 | 0 | .733 | 14 | 10 | 0 | .583 | 5th | NCAA Super Regional |
| 2015 | Mike Candrea | Pac-12 | 41 | 20 | 0 | .672 | 13 | 11 | 0 | .542 | 3rd | NCAA Super Regional |
| 2016 | Mike Candrea | Pac-12 | 40 | 21 | 0 | .656 | 13 | 11 | 0 | .542 | 5th | NCAA Super Regional |
| 2017 | Mike Candrea | Pac-12 | 52 | 8 | 0 | .867 | 18 | 7 | 0 | .720 | 1st | NCAA Super Regional |
| 2018 | Mike Candrea | Pac-12 | 43 | 14 | 0 | .754 | 13 | 11 | 0 | .542 | 5th | NCAA Super Regional |
| 2019 | Mike Candrea | Pac-12 | 48 | 14 | 0 | .774 | 19 | 5 | 0 | .792 | 3rd | WCWS, Fifth place |
| 2020 | Mike Candrea | Pac-12 | 22 | 3 | 0 | .880 | 0 | 0 | 0 | – | | Season canceled due to COVID-19 |
| 2021 | Mike Candrea | Pac-12 | 41 | 13 | 0 | .759 | 12 | 10 | 0 | .545 | 5th | WCWS, Seventh place |
| 2022 | Caitlin Lowe | Pac-12 | 39 | 22 | 0 | .639 | 8 | 16 | 0 | .333 | 8th | WCWS, Fifth place |
| 2023 | Caitlin Lowe | Pac-12 | 29 | 25 | 0 | .537 | 6 | 18 | 0 | .250 | 8th | |
| 2024 | Caitlin Lowe | Pac-12 | 37 | 18 | 1 | .670 | 13 | 11 | 0 | .542 | 5th | NCAA Super Regional |
| 2025 | Caitlin Lowe | Big 12 | 48 | 13 | 0 | .787 | 17 | 7 | 0 | .708 | 2nd | NCAA Regional |
| 2026 | Caitlin Lowe | Big 12 | 37 | 18 | 0 | .673 | 16 | 8 | 0 | .667 | T–2nd | NCAA Regional |
