= List of Fresno State Bulldogs head softball coaches =

The Fresno State Bulldogs softball program is a college softball team that represents the California State University, Fresno in the Mountain West Conference in the National Collegiate Athletic Association. The team has had four head coaches since it started playing organized softball in the 1978 season.

== Key ==
General
#	Number of coaches (Note: A running total of the number of head coaches.)
GC	Games coached

Overall
OW	Wins
OL	Losses
OT	Ties
O%	Winning percentage

Conference (Note: Fresno State played as a member of the Northern California Athletic Conference from 1978–1982, followed by the Northern Pacific Conference until 1987, when the Big West Conference began sponsoring women's sports. They joined the Western Athletic Conference in 1993, and later moved to the Mountain West Conference in 2013.)
CW	Wins
CL	Losses
CT	Ties
C%	Winning percentage

Postseason (Note: Postseason play involving the NCAA Division I Softball Championship or AIAW Women's College World Series.)
PA	Total Appearances (Note: Postseason appearances include seasons with NCAA Division I Softball Championship bids since the tournament began in 1982.)
PW	Total Wins
PL	Total Losses
WA	Women's College World Series appearances (Note: Women's College World Series appearances include seasons with WCWS bids since the tournament began in 1969.)
WW	Women's College World Series wins
WL	Women's College World Series losses

Championships
CC	Conference regular season
CT	Conference Tournament
NC	National championships (Note: Women's College World Series sponsored by either the AIAW or NCAA.)

== Coaches ==
List of head softball coaches showing season(s) coached, overall records, conference records, postseason records, championships and selected awards (Note: Statistics correct as of the end of the 2021 NCAA Division I softball season.)
#	Name	Term	GC	OW	OL	OT	O%	CW	CL	CT	C%	PA	WA	CCs	CTs	NCs
1	Donna Pickel	1978–1985	386	266	120	0	.689	92	22	0	.807	4	2	4	0	0
2	Margie Wright	1986–2012	1,745	1,294	450	1	.742	524	127	0	.805	26	10	16	3	1
3	Trisha Ford	2013–2016	217	143	73	1	.661	68	21	0	.764	2	0	2	0	0
4	Linda Garza	2017–present	243	161	82	0	.663	62	33	0	.653	2	0	1	1	0
