= Women's College World Series Most Outstanding Player =

- Awarded for: Best player in the Women's College World Series
- Country: United States
- First award: 1969 (ASA), 1995 (NCAA)
- Currently held by: Teagan Kavan, Texas

The Women's College World Series Most Outstanding Player is an award for the best individual performance during the Women's College World Series, the college softball national championship event in the United States. The recipient of the award is announced at the completion of the Women's College World Series Championship Game. The award is similar to Major League Baseball's World Series Most Valuable Player award and college baseball's College World Series Most Outstanding Player award.

== Voting process ==
The press attending the championship series vote on the Most Outstanding Player during the game. In the fifth inning, ballots are distributed. The voting is closed by the eighth inning. The Most Outstanding Player is announced following the awarding of trophies to the runner-up and championship teams. If a third game of the championship series is necessary, the ballots taken during the second game are discarded, and a new round of balloting is conducted during the third and deciding game.

== List ==
Key
Year	Links to the article about that corresponding Women's College World Series
§	Indicates team did not win the series

Winners
Year	Name	Position	School
1969	Judy Lloyd	Pitcher	John F. Kennedy
1970	Kay Camp	Pitcher	John F. Kennedy
1971	Paula Miller	Pitcher	Arizona State^{§}
1978	Sue Enquist	Center fielder	UCLA
1980	Mary Lou Ramm	Pitcher	Utah State
1995	Tanya Harding	Pitcher	UCLA
1996	Jenny Dalton	Second baseman	Arizona
1997	Nancy Evans	Pitcher	Arizona
1998	Amanda Scott	Pitcher	Fresno State
1999	Julie Adams	Third Baseman	UCLA
2000	Jennifer Stewart	Pitcher	Oklahoma
2001	Jennie Finch	Pitcher / First baseman	Arizona
2002	Jocelyn Forest	Pitcher	California
2003	Keira Goerl	Pitcher	UCLA
2004	Kristin Schmidt	Pitcher	LSU^{§}
2005	Samantha Findlay	First baseman	Michigan
2006	Alicia Hollowell	Pitcher	Arizona
2007	Taryne Mowatt	Pitcher	Arizona
2008	Katie Burkhart	Pitcher	Arizona State
2009	Danielle Lawrie	Pitcher	Washington
2010	Megan Langenfeld	Pitcher / First baseman	UCLA
2011	Dallas Escobedo	Pitcher	Arizona State
2011	Michelle Moultrie	Center fielder	Florida^{§}
2012	Jackie Traina	Pitcher	Alabama
2013	Keilani Ricketts	Pitcher	Oklahoma
2014	Hannah Rogers	Pitcher	Florida
2015	Lauren Haeger	Pitcher	Florida
2016	Paige Parker	Pitcher	Oklahoma
2017	Shay Knighten	First baseman	Oklahoma
2018	Jessie Warren	Third baseman	Florida State
2019	Rachel Garcia	Pitcher	UCLA
2020	Tournament cancelled due to COVID-19 pandemic		
2021	Giselle Juarez	Pitcher	Oklahoma
2022	Jocelyn Alo	Utility	Oklahoma
2023	Jordy Bahl	Pitcher	Oklahoma
2024	Kelly Maxwell	Pitcher	Oklahoma
2025	Teagan Kavan	Pitcher	Texas
2026	Teagan Kavan	Pitcher	Texas

== See also ==
- List of sports awards honoring women
- Women's College World Series
