= 1969 Women's College World Series =

The 1969 Women's College World Series of softball was organized by the Omaha Softball Association and recognized by the Division for Girls' and Women's Sports (DGWS) as a championship tournament. Softball teams from nine colleges met on May 16–18 in Omaha and Fremont, Nebraska. A tenth team from the Philippines encountered a travel delay en route and was forced to miss the tournament. The first day of games was rained out, causing the 16 games to be played in two days. Connie Claussen, the chair of the physical education department at the University of Nebraska–Omaha, was a driving force in organizing and directing that first tournament, as well as the next ten while the series was held in Omaha.

The John F. Kennedy College Patriettes won the first college softball championship by winning all five of their games, defeating Illinois State in the final, 2–0. Patriettes pitcher Judy Lloyd was named the Most Outstanding Player of the tournament.

== Teams ==
The double-elimination tournament included these teams:

- Black Hills State College (South Dakota)
- Colorado State College (now University of Northern Colorado)
- Creighton University (Nebraska)
- Illinois State University
- John F. Kennedy College (Nebraska)
- Kearney State College (Nebraska)
- St. Petersburg Junior College (Florida)
- Southwest Missouri State College
- University of Nebraska–Omaha

Far Eastern University of Manila was also expected to compete; however, mechanical issues with their airplane forced them to forfeit.

== Bracket ==
The bracket, which was originally planned to be a ten-team tournament, included nine teams, with results as shown.

Upper round 1	Upper round 2	Upper round 3	Upper final	Final
Illinois State	2
John F. Kennedy	19	John F. Kennedy	3^{(8)}
John F. Kennedy	6
Black Hills State	0
St. Petersburg JC	2
St. Petersburg JC	9
Kearney State	7
John F. Kennedy	9
Southwest Missouri	0
Southwest Missouri	1
Nebraska–Omaha	0
Southwest Missouri	14
Colorado State College	2
Colorado State College	12
Creighton	3	John F. Kennedy	2	–
Illinois State	0	–
Lower round 1	Lower round 2	Lower round 3	Lower round 4	Lower final
St. Petersburg JC	0
Illinois State	12	Illinois State	2	Southwest Missouri	0 (Note: The Missouri State Softball Media Guide lists this score as 5–1.)
Kearney State	8	Kearney State	1	Illinois State	4	Illinois State	5
Creighton	5	Colorado State College	0
Colorado State College	10
Nebraska Omaha	4	Black Hills State	0
Black Hills State	8

== Ranking ==
Place	School	WCWS Record
1st	John F. Kennedy College	5–0
2nd	Illinois State	4–2
3rd	Southwest Missouri State	2–2
4th	Colorado State	2–2
5th	St. Petersburg Jr. College	1–2
5th	Black Hills State	1–2
7th	Kearney State	1–2
8th	Creighton	0–2
8th	Nebraska–Omaha	0–2
