= Margie Wright Diamond =

College softball stadium in Fresno, California

- Interactive map of Margie Wright Diamond
- Former names: Bulldog Diamond (1996–2014)
- Location: Fresno, California; United States
- Coordinates: 36.814961°N 119.753070°W
- Capacity: 1,688
- Surface: Natural grass
- Field size: 205' LF, 220' CF, 205' RF

Construction
- Opened: 1996

Tenants
- Fresno State Bulldogs softball - (NCAA); 1996 – present

Margie Wright Diamond is a college softball stadium located on the campus of California State University, Fresno. It is the home field of the Fresno State Bulldogs softball team. The venue is named for legendary Bulldogs coach Margie Wright, who led Fresno State to 1,294 wins, eight Women's College World Series appearances and the 1998 Women's College World Series championship. She retired as college softball's all-time wins leader.
