= Women's College World Series =

Final portion of the NCAA Division I softball tournament for college softball

- First played: 1969 (58 years ago)
- Most recently played: 2026
- Current champion: Texas
- First Champion: John F. Kennedy College

The Women's College World Series (WCWS) is the final portion of the NCAA Division I softball tournament for college softball in the United States and is held annually in Oklahoma City, Oklahoma. The event is held at Devon Park, located within the USA Softball Hall of Fame complex.

The eight teams of the WCWS play a double-elimination tournament until two teams remain. These two teams compete in a best-of-three series to determine the Division I WCWS national champion. Previous WCWS losses do not factor into the best-of-three championship series, and the first team to win two of three games is declared the national champion.

Like the Men's College World Series in baseball, the WCWS initially divides the eight teams ranked one (the top seed) through eight and are then divided into two brackets of four teams. Those 8 teams are the final 8 out of 64 teams that advance post regular season. The teams play their first-round matchups as follows: 1 v 8, 2 v 7, 3 v 6 and 4 v 5. Unique to the WCWS is that the loser of the second-round game on one side of the bracket crosses over to the losers’ bracket on the other side. Suffering a second loss eliminates a team from the WCWS.

The second round features the four winners of the first-round games against each other, with the highest remaining seed versus the lowest remaining undefeated seed. In the losers’ bracket, the four first-round losers face each other, with the two winners advancing and the two losers, who have each suffered their second defeat, being eliminated from the tournament. The third round features the two losing teams from the second round (winners’ bracket) versus second-round winners (from the losers’ bracket), while the two remaining undefeated teams get a day of rest. Once the third round is complete, four teams have been eliminated. The remaining four teams will then play each other in the semifinal round, with one team with one loss playing one team with no losses. If a team with a loss loses again, they are eliminated. If teams with no losses suffer a (first) loss, the remaining teams will then be realigned and forced to play one last time, with the winners advancing to the best-of-three championship series. If by chance one or both unbeaten teams win in round four, then that team (or both teams) advances to the best-of-three championship series. From there games are cut to one game per day over the next three days (weather permitting). This feature allows any two of the eight WCWS teams to advance to the championship series, unlike the MCWS, whose two halves remain separate until the championship series.

The WCWS takes place at Devon Park in Oklahoma City. From 1969 to 1981, the women's collegiate softball championship was also known as the Women's College World Series and was promoted as such. During 1969–1979, the series was played in Omaha, after which the Association for Intercollegiate Athletics for Women (AIAW) held the series in 1980–1982 in Norman, Oklahoma. There were two competing World Series tournaments in 1982. The NCAA held its first six Division I tournaments in Omaha in 1982–1987, followed by Sunnyvale, California, in 1988–1989. The event has been held in Oklahoma City every year since then, except for 1996, when it was held at the softball venue for the 1996 Summer Olympics in Columbus, Georgia.

Softball was one of twelve women's sports added to the NCAA championship program for the 1981–82 school year, as the NCAA engaged in battle with the AIAW for sole governance of women's collegiate sports. The AIAW continued to conduct its established championship program in the same twelve (and other) sports. The 1982 softball championship tournaments of both the AIAW and the NCAA were called "Women's College World Series". However, after a year of dual women's championships, the NCAA won out over the AIAW.

== Division I ==
=== NCAA ===
Year	Location	Champion	Title series score***	Runner-up	Semifinalists/tie-3rd		Tie-5th		Tie-7th (first 2 eliminated)	
**1982**	Seymour Smith Park; Omaha, NE	**UCLA**; WCAA	2–0 (8 inn)	Fresno State; NorPac	Cal State Fullerton; WCAA	Arizona State; WCAA	Nebraska; Big Eight	Western Michigan; MAC	Creighton; Gateway	Oklahoma State; Big Eight
**1983**	Seymour Smith Park; Omaha, NE	**Texas A&M**; Southwest	2–0 (12 inn)	Cal State Fullerton; WCAA	UCLA; WCAA	South Carolina; Independent	Louisiana Tech; Southland	Pacific; NorPac	Indiana; Big Ten	Missouri; Big Eight
**1984**	Seymour Smith Park; Omaha, NE	**UCLA**; WCAA	1–0 (13 inn)	Texas A&M; Southwest	Northwestern; Big Ten	Nebraska; Big Eight	Adelphi; Atlantic 10	Fresno State; NorPac	Cal Poly Pomona; Independent	Utah State; High Country
**1985**	Seymour Smith Park; Omaha, NE	**UCLA**; WCAA	2–1 (9 inn)	Nebraska*; Big Eight	Cal State Fullerton; PCAA	Cal Poly Pomona; PCAA	Adelphi; Atlantic 10	Northwestern; Big Ten	Louisiana Tech; Southland	Utah; High Country
**1986**	Seymour Smith Park; Omaha, NE	**Cal State Fullerton**; PCAA	3–0	Texas A&M; Southwest	California; NorPac	Indiana; Big Ten	Creighton; Gateway	Long Beach State; PCAA	Louisiana Tech; Southland	Northwestern; Big Ten
**1987**	Seymour Smith Park; Omaha, NE	**Texas A&M**; Southwest	4–1	UCLA; Pac-10	Cal State Fullerton; PCAA	Nebraska; Big Eight	Central Michigan; MAC	Fresno State; PCAA	Arizona State; Pac-10	Florida State; Metro
**1988**	Twin Creeks Sports Complex; Sunnyvale, California	**UCLA**; Pac-10	3–0	Fresno State; PCAA	Arizona; Pac-10	Cal Poly Pomona; PCAA	Nebraska; Big Eight	Texas A&M; Southwest	Adelphi; Atlantic 10	Northern Illinois; North Star
**1989**	Twin Creeks Sports Complex; Sunnyvale, California	**UCLA**; Pac-10	1–0	Fresno State; Big West	Arizona; Pac-10	Oklahoma State; Big Eight	Cal Poly Pomona; Big West	Oregon; Pac-10	South Carolina; Metro	Toledo; MAC
**1990**	USA Softball Hall of Fame Stadium; Oklahoma City, OK	**UCLA**; Pac-10	2–0	Fresno State; Big West	Florida State; Metro	Oklahoma State; Big Eight	Long Beach State; Big West	UNLV; Big West	Arizona; Pac-10	Kent State; MAC
**1991**	USA Softball Hall of Fame Stadium; Oklahoma City, OK	**Arizona**; Pac-10	5–1	UCLA; Pac-10	Fresno State; Big West	Long Beach State; Big West	Florida State; Metro	Missouri; Big Eight	UNLV; Big West	Utah; WAC
**1992**	USA Softball Hall of Fame Stadium; Oklahoma City, OK	**UCLA**; Pac-10	2–0	Arizona; Pac-10	Fresno State; Big West	UMass; Atlantic 10	California; Pac-10	Long Beach State; Big West	Florida State; ACC	Kansas; Big Eight
**1993**	USA Softball Hall of Fame Stadium; Oklahoma City, OK	**Arizona**; Pac-10	1–0	UCLA; Pac-10	Southwestern Louisiana; Sun Belt	Oklahoma State; Big Eight	Cal State Northridge; WAC	Connecticut; Big East	Florida State; ACC	Long Beach State; Big West
**1994**	USA Softball Hall of Fame Stadium; Oklahoma City, OK	**Arizona**; Pac-10	4–0	Cal State Northridge; WAC	Oklahoma State; Big Eight	UCLA; Pac-10	Fresno State; WAC	Utah; WAC	Illinois–Chicago; Mid-Con	Missouri; Big Eight
**1995**	USA Softball Hall of Fame Stadium; Oklahoma City, OK	UCLA**; Pac-10	4–2	Arizona; Pac-10	Iowa; Big Ten	UNLV; Big West	Cal State Fullerton; Big West	Southwestern Louisiana; Sun Belt	Michigan; Big Ten	Princeton; Ivy
**1996**	Golden Park; Columbus, GA	**Arizona**; Pac-10	6–4	Washington; Pac-10	Iowa; Big Ten	UCLA; Pac-10	California; Pac-10	Southwestern Louisiana; Sun Belt	Michigan; Big Ten	Princeton; Ivy
**1997**	USA Softball Hall of Fame Stadium; Oklahoma City, OK	**Arizona**; Pac-10	10–2 (5 inn)	UCLA; Pac-10	Fresno State; WAC	Washington; Pac-10	Iowa; Big Ten	Michigan; Big Ten	UMass; Atlantic 10	South Carolina; SEC
**1998**	USA Softball Hall of Fame Stadium; Oklahoma City, OK	**Fresno State**; WAC	1–0	Arizona; Pac-10	Oklahoma State; Big 12	Washington; Pac-10	Michigan; Big Ten	Nebraska; Big 12	UMass; Atlantic 10	Texas; Big 12
**1999**	USA Softball Hall of Fame Stadium; Oklahoma City, OK	**UCLA**; Pac-10	3–2	Washington; Pac-10	California; Pac-10	DePaul; Conference USA	Arizona; Pac-10	Fresno State; WAC	Arizona State; Pac-10	Southern Miss; Conference USA
**2000**	USA Softball Hall of Fame Stadium; Oklahoma City, OK	**Oklahoma**; Big 12	3–1	UCLA; Pac-10	Arizona; Pac-10	Southern Miss; Conference USA	Alabama; SEC	Washington; Pac-10	California; Pac-10	DePaul; Conference USA
**2001**	USA Softball Hall of Fame Stadium; Oklahoma City, OK	**Arizona**; Pac-10	1–0	UCLA; Pac-10	LSU; SEC	Stanford; Pac-10	California; Pac-10	Oklahoma; Big 12	Iowa; Big Ten	Michigan; Big Ten
**2002**	USA Softball Hall of Fame Stadium; Oklahoma City, OK	**California**; Pac-10	6–0	Arizona; Pac-10	Arizona State; Pac-10	Florida State; ACC	Nebraska; Big 12	UCLA; Pac-10	Michigan; Big Ten	Oklahoma; Big 12
**2003**	USA Softball Hall of Fame Stadium; Oklahoma City, OK	**UCLA**; Pac-10	1–0 (9 inn)	California; Pac-10	Arizona; Pac-10	Texas; Big 12	Oklahoma; Big 12	Washington; Pac-10	Alabama; SEC	Louisiana–Lafayette; Sun Belt
**2004**	USA Softball Hall of Fame Stadium; Oklahoma City, OK	**UCLA**; Pac-10	3–1	California; Pac-10	LSU; SEC	Stanford; Pac-10	Florida State; ACC	Oklahoma; Big 12	Michigan; Big Ten	Washington; Pac-10
2005***	USA Softball Hall of Fame Stadium; Oklahoma City, OK	**Michigan**; Big Ten	0–5; 5–2; 4–1 (10 inn)	UCLA; Pac-10	Tennessee; SEC	Texas; Big 12	Alabama; SEC	Arizona; Pac-10	California; Pac-10	DePaul; Conference USA
**2006**	USA Softball Hall of Fame Stadium; Oklahoma City, OK	**Arizona**; Pac-10	8–0; 5–0	Northwestern; Big Ten	Tennessee; SEC	UCLA; Pac-10	Arizona State; Pac-10	Texas; Big 12	Alabama; SEC	Oregon State; Pac-10
**2007**	USA Softball Hall of Fame Stadium; Oklahoma City, OK	**Arizona**; Pac-10	0–3; 1–0 (10 inn); 5–0	Tennessee; SEC	Northwestern; Big Ten	Washington; Pac-10	Baylor; Big 12	DePaul; Big East	Arizona State; Pac-10	Texas A&M; Big 12
**2008**	USA Softball Hall of Fame Stadium; Oklahoma City, OK	**Arizona State**; Pac-10	3–0; 11–0	Texas A&M; Big 12	Alabama; SEC	Florida; SEC	Louisiana–Lafayette; Sun Belt	UCLA; Pac-10	Arizona; Pac-10	Virginia Tech; ACC
**2009**	USA Softball Hall of Fame Stadium; Oklahoma City, OK	**Washington**; Pac-10	8–0; 3–2	Florida; SEC	Alabama; SEC	Georgia; SEC	Arizona; Pac-10	Michigan; Big Ten	Arizona State; Pac-10	Missouri; Big 12
**2010**	USA Softball Hall of Fame Stadium; Oklahoma City, OK	**UCLA**; Pac-10	6–5 (8 inn); 15–9	Arizona; Pac-10	Georgia; SEC	Tennessee; SEC	Florida; SEC	Hawaii; WAC	Missouri; Big 12	Washington; Pac-10
**2011**	USA Softball Hall of Fame Stadium; Oklahoma City, OK	**Arizona State**; Pac-10	14–4; 7–2	Florida; SEC	Alabama; SEC	Baylor; Big 12	California; Pac-10	Missouri; Big 12	Oklahoma; Big 12	Oklahoma State; Big 12
**2012**	USA Softball Hall of Fame Stadium; Oklahoma City, OK	**Alabama**; SEC	1–4; 8–6; 5–4	Oklahoma; Big 12	California; Pac-12	Arizona State; Pac-12	Oregon; Pac-12	LSU; SEC	South Florida; Big East	Tennessee; SEC
**2013**	USA Softball Hall of Fame Stadium; Oklahoma City, OK	**Oklahoma**; Big 12	5–3 (12 inn); 4–0	Tennessee; SEC	Washington; Pac-12	Texas; Big 12	Michigan; Big Ten	Florida; SEC	Arizona State; Pac-12	Nebraska; Big Ten
**2014**	USA Softball Hall of Fame Stadium; Oklahoma City, OK	**Florida**; SEC	5–0; 6–3	Alabama; SEC	Oregon; Pac-12	Baylor; Big 12	Oklahoma; Big 12	Kentucky; SEC	Louisiana–Lafayette; Sun Belt	Florida State; ACC
**2015**	USA Softball Hall of Fame Stadium; Oklahoma City, OK	**Florida**; SEC	3–2; 0–1; 4–1	Michigan; Big Ten	Auburn; SEC	LSU; SEC	UCLA; Pac-12	Alabama; SEC	Oregon; Pac-12	Tennessee; SEC
**2016**	USA Softball Hall of Fame Stadium; Oklahoma City, OK	**Oklahoma**; Big 12	3–2; 7–11 (8 inn); 2–1	Auburn; SEC	Florida State; ACC	LSU; SEC	Michigan; Big Ten	Georgia; SEC	Alabama; SEC	UCLA; Pac-12
**2017**	USA Softball Hall of Fame Stadium; Oklahoma City, OK	**Oklahoma**; Big 12	7–5 (17 inn); 5–4	Florida; SEC	Oregon; Pac-12	Washington; Pac-12	LSU; SEC	UCLA; Pac-12	Baylor; Big 12	Texas A&M; SEC
**2018**	USA Softball Hall of Fame Stadium; Oklahoma City, OK	**Florida State**; ACC	1–0; 8–3	Washington; Pac-12	UCLA; Pac-12	Oklahoma; Big 12	Oregon; Pac-12	Florida; SEC	Georgia; SEC	Arizona State; Pac-12
**2019**	USA Softball Hall of Fame Stadium; Oklahoma City, OK	**UCLA**; Pac-12	16–3; 5–4	Oklahoma; Big 12	Alabama; SEC	Washington; Pac-12	Arizona; Pac-12	Oklahoma State; Big 12	Florida; SEC	Minnesota; Big Ten
**2020**	Canceled due to the COVID-19 pandemic									
**2021**	USA Softball Hall of Fame Stadium; Oklahoma City, OK	**Oklahoma**; Big 12	4–8; 6–2; 5–1	Florida State; ACC	Alabama; SEC	James Madison; CAA	Oklahoma State; Big 12	UCLA; Pac-12	Arizona; Pac-12	Georgia; SEC
**2022**	USA Softball Hall of Fame Stadium; Oklahoma City, OK	**Oklahoma**; Big 12	16–1; 10–5	Texas; Big 12	Oklahoma State; Big 12	UCLA; Pac-12	Arizona; Pac-12	Florida; SEC	Northwestern; Big Ten	Oregon State; Pac-12
**2023**	USA Softball Hall of Fame Stadium; Oklahoma City, OK	**Oklahoma**; Big 12	5–0; 3–1	Florida State; ACC	Stanford; Pac-12	Tennessee; SEC	Washington; Pac-12	Oklahoma State; Big 12	Utah; Pac-12	Alabama; SEC
**2024**	Devon Park; Oklahoma City, OK	**Oklahoma**; Big 12	8–3; 8–4	Texas; Big 12	Stanford; Pac-12	Florida; SEC	UCLA; Pac-12	Alabama; SEC	Duke; ACC	Oklahoma State; Big 12
**2025**	Devon Park; Oklahoma City, OK	**Texas**; SEC	2–1; 3–4; 10–4	Texas Tech; Big 12	Oklahoma; SEC	Tennessee; SEC	Oregon; Big Ten	UCLA; Big Ten	Florida; SEC	Ole Miss; SEC
**2026**	Devon Park; Oklahoma City, OK	**Texas**; SEC	7-3 4-1	Texas Tech; Big 12	Alabama; SEC	Tennessee; SEC	Nebraska; Big Ten	UCLA; Big Ten	Arkansas; SEC	Mississippi State; SEC

* Nebraska's runner-up finish in 1985 was vacated by the NCAA.

** The 1995 title by UCLA and any related records have been vacated by the NCAA due to scholarship violations. Criticism also centered on UCLA player Tanya Harding who was recruited from Queensland, Australia, midway through the 1995 season. After UCLA captured the NCAA National Championship, Harding, the MVP of the tournament, returned to her homeland without taking final exams or earning a single college credit. Despite UCLA's not having violated any formal rules in its recruitment of Harding, the incident generated heated criticism that some foreign athletes were little more than hired guns.

*** Beginning in 2005, a best-of-three series determines the national championship.

=== AIAW ===
From 1969 to 1972, the DGWS (forerunner organization of the AIAW) recognized the WCWS, organized by the Amateur Softball Association, as the collegiate championship tournament. The AIAW assumed responsibilities from DGWS in 1973.

Year	Champion	Title series game score(s)	Runner-up
**1969**	John F. Kennedy College	2–0	Illinois State
**1970**	John F. Kennedy College	0–2; 7–6	Southwest Missouri State
**1971**	John F. Kennedy College	6–0; 4–0	Iowa State
**1972**	Arizona State	0–1; 8–5 (11 inn)	Nihon University
**1973**	Arizona State	0–4; 4–3 (16 inn)	Illinois State
**1974**	Southwest Missouri State	14–7	Northern Colorado
**1975**	Nebraska–Omaha	1–11; 6–4	Northern Iowa
**1976**	Michigan State	3–0	Northern Colorado
**1977**	Northern Iowa	0–1 (9 inn); 7–0	Arizona
**1978**	UCLA	3–0	Northern Colorado
**1979**	Texas Woman's	1–0; 1–0	UCLA
**1980** (Note: Officially named the "AIAW Division I National Softball Championship.")	Utah State	1–0; 2–1	Indiana
**1981** (Note: Officially named the "AIAW College Softball World Series.")	Utah State	1–6; 4–3	Cal State Fullerton
**1982**	Texas A&M	4–1; 5–3 (8 inn)	Oklahoma State

=== NCAA team titles by school ===
Team	Number	Winning years
UCLA	12	1982, 1984, 1985, 1988, 1989, 1990, 1992, 1999, 2003, 2004, 2010, 2019
Arizona	8	1991, 1993, 1994, 1996, 1997, 2001, 2006, 2007
Oklahoma	8	2000, 2013, 2016, 2017, 2021, 2022, 2023, 2024
Arizona State	2	2008, 2011
Florida	2	2014, 2015
Texas	2	2025, 2026
Texas A&M	2	1983, 1987
Alabama	1	2012
Cal State Fullerton	1	1986
California	1	2002
Florida State	1	2018
Fresno State	1	1998
Michigan	1	2005
Washington	1	2009

*UCLA also won the 1995 title, but it has since been vacated by the NCAA; see above.

=== AIAW team titles by school ===
From 1969 to 1972, the DGWS (forerunner organization of the AIAW) recognized the WCWS, organized by the Amateur Softball Association, as the collegiate championship tournament. The AIAW assumed responsibilities from DGWS in 1973.

School	Championships	Years
John F. Kennedy College (NE)	3	1969, 1970, 1971 (all DGWS)
Arizona State	2	1972 (DGWS), 1973
Utah State	2	1980, 1981
Florida State	2	1981, 1982 (both slow pitch)
Southwest Missouri State	1	1974
Nebraska–Omaha	1	1975
Michigan State	1	1976
Northern Iowa	1	1977
UCLA	1	1978
Texas Woman's	1	1979
Texas A&M	1	1982

=== Championships and appearances by school ===
- Color coded by current conference.
- **Bold** indicates team championship.
- Teams are listed under their current athletic brand names.

School	Championships (through 2026)	Title games/series (through 2026)	WCWS appearances (through 2026)	WCWS appearances (through 2026)
UCLA^{‡}	13	22	37	**1978**, 1979, 1981, **1982**, (Note: NCAA WCWS participant in 1982, when both the AIAW and NCAA conducted championships with the same name) 1983, **1984**, **1985**, 1987, **1988**, **1989**, **1990**, 1991, **1992**, 1993, 1994, 1996, 1997, **1999**, 2000, 2001, 2002, **2003**, **2004**, 2005, 2006, 2008, **2010**, 2015, 2016, 2017, 2018, **2019**, 2021, 2022, 2024, 2025, 2026
Arizona	8	14	29	1974, 1975, 1977, 1979, 1988, 1989, 1990, **1991**, 1992, **1993**, **1994**, 1995, **1996**, **1997**, 1998, 1999, 2000, **2001**, 2002, 2003, 2005, **2006**, **2007**, 2008, 2009, 2010, 2019, 2021, 2022
Oklahoma	8	10	22	1975, 1980, 1981, 1982, (Note: AIAW WCWS participant in 1982, when both the AIAW and NCAA conducted championships with the same name) **2000**, 2001, 2002, 2003, 2004, 2011, 2012, **2013**, 2014, **2016**, **2017**, 2018, 2019, **2021**, **2022,** **2023**, **2024**, 2025
Arizona State	4	4	19	1971, **1972**, **1973**, 1976, 1977, 1978, 1979, 1982, 1987, 1999, 2002, 2006, 2007, **2008**, 2009, **2011**, 2012, 2013, 2018
Alabama	1	2	16	2000, 2003, 2005, 2006, 2008, 2009, 2011, **2012**, 2014, 2015, 2016, 2019, 2021, 2023, 2024, 2026
Oklahoma State	0	1	16	1977, 1980, 1981, 1982, 1982, 1989, 1990, 1993, 1994, 1998, 2011, 2019, 2021, 2022, 2023, 2024
Washington	1	4	15	1996, 1997, 1998, 1999, 2000, 2003, 2004, 2007, **2009**, 2010, 2013, 2017, 2018, 2019, 2023
California	1	3	15	1980, 1981, 1982, 1986, 1992, 1996, 1999, 2000, 2001, **2002**, 2003, 2004, 2005, 2011, 2012
Michigan	1	2	13	1982, 1995, 1996, 1997, 1998, 2001, 2002, 2004, **2005**, 2009, 2013, 2015, 2016
Florida	2	5	13	2008, 2009, 2010, 2011, 2013, **2014**, **2015**, 2017, 2018, 2019, 2022, 2024, 2025
Florida State	1	3	12	1987, 1990, 1991, 1992, 1993, 2002, 2004, 2014, 2016, **2018**, 2021, 2023
Fresno State	1	5	12	1982, 1984, 1987, 1988, 1989, 1990, 1991, 1992, 1994, 1997, **1998**, 1999
Texas A&M	3	6	12	1979, 1980, 1981, **1982**, **1983**, 1984, 1986, **1987**, 1988, 2007, 2008, 2017
Northern Colorado	0	3	11	1969, 1970, 1971, 1972, 1973, 1974, 1975, 1976, 1977, 1978, 1979
South Carolina	0	0	11	1972, 1973, 1974, 1976, 1978, 1979, 1980, 1981, 1983, 1989, 1997
Missouri State (Note: All appearances to date made as Southwest Missouri State.)	1	2	10	1969, 1970, 1971, 1972, 1973, **1974**, 1977, 1978, 1980, 1982
Omaha (Note: All appearances to date made as Nebraska–Omaha.)	1	1	10	1969, 1970, 1971, 1972, 1973, **1975**, 1976, 1977, 1978, 1979
Nebraska^{‡}	0	0	10	1970, 1971, 1982, 1984, 1987, 1988, 1998, 2002, 2013, 2026
Tennessee	0	2	10	2005, 2006, 2007, 2010, 2012, 2013, 2015, 2023, 2025, 2026
Texas	2	4	9	1998, 2003, 2005, 2006, 2013, 2022, 2024, **2025**, **2026**
Cal State Fullerton	1	3	8	1980, 1981, 1982, 1983, 1985, **1986** 1987, 1995
Illinois State	0	2	8	1969, 1970, 1971, 1972, 1973, 1976, 1978, 1981
Western Illinois	0	0	8	1970, 1972, 1973, 1975, 1977, 1979, 1980, 1982
Oregon	0	0	9	1976, 1980, 1989, 2012, 2014, 2015, 2017, 2018, 2025
Missouri	0	0	7	1981, 1983, 1991, 1994, 2009, 2010, 2011
Cal Poly Pomona	0	0	7	1978, 1979, 1980, 1984, 1985, 1988, 1989
Kansas	0	0	7	1973, 1974, 1975, 1976, 1977, 1979, 1992
Michigan State	1	1	6	1973, 1974, 1975, **1976**, 1977, 1981
Louisiana	0	0	6	1993, 1995, 1996, 2003, 2008, 2014
LSU	0	0	6	2001, 2004, 2012, 2015, 2016, 2017
Utah	0	0	6	1976, 1982, 1985, 1991, 1994, 2023
Northwestern	0	1	6	1984, 1985, 1986, 2006, 2007, 2022
UMass	0	0	6	1974, 1978, 1980, 1992, 1997, 1998
Long Beach State	0	0	5	1986, 1990, 1991, 1992, 1993
Creighton	0	0	5	1969, 1980, 1981, 1982, 1986
Georgia	0	0	5	2009, 2010, 2016, 2018, 2021
Oregon State	0	0	5	1977, 1978, 1979, 2006, 2022
Wayne State (NE)	0	0	5	1970, 1971, 1972, 1973, 1974
Utah State	2	2	4	1978, **1980**, **1981**, 1984
Northern Iowa	1	2	4	1973, 1975, 1976, **1977**
Baylor	0	0	4	2007, 2011, 2014, 2017
Indiana	0	1	4	1979, 1980, 1983, 1986
DePaul	0	0	4	1999, 2000, 2005, 2007
Iowa	0	0	4	1995, 1996, 1997, 2001
Southern Illinois (Note: The NCAA uses "Southern Illinois" strictly to refer to the university's main campus in Carbondale. The Edwardsville campus is referred to as either "SIU Edwardsville" or "SIUE".)	0	0	4	1970, 1971, 1977, 1978
South Dakota State	0	0	4	1971, 1972, 1973, 1974
Stanford	0	0	4	2001, 2004, 2023, 2024
Luther (IA)	0	0	4	1970, 1971, 1972, 1974
John F. Kennedy (NE)	3	3	3	**1969**, **1970**, **1971**
Texas Woman's	1	1	3	1975, 1978, **1979**
Minnesota	0	0	3	1976, 1978, 2019
Louisiana Tech	0	0	3	1983, 1985, 1986
Adelphi	0	0	3	1984, 1985, 1988
UNLV	0	0	3	1990, 1991, 1995
Western Michigan	0	0	3	1980, 1981, 1982
Nebraska–Kearney (Note: Made all appearances as Kearney State.)	0	0	3	1969, 1970, 1971
Minot State	0	0	3	1970, 1971, 1972
Emporia State	0	0	3	1971, 1972, 1979
Weber State	0	0	3	1973, 1974, 1975
North Dakota State	0	0	3	1973, 1974, 1975
Iowa State	0	1	2	1971, 1973
Texas Tech	0	2	2	2025, 2026
Cal State Northridge	0	1	2	1993, 1994
Princeton	0	0	2	1995, 1996
Southern Miss	0	0	2	1999, 2000
Central Michigan	0	0	2	1982, 1987
Minnesota–Duluth	0	0	2	1970, 1971
Midland Lutheran (NE)	0	0	2	1970, 1971
New Mexico	0	0	2	1980, 1981
Rutgers	0	0	2	1979, 1981
Concordia (NE)	0	0	2	1970, 1971
Upper Iowa	0	0	2	1970, 1971
Eastern Illinois	0	0	2	1971, 1974
Central Missouri	0	0	2	1971, 1972
Ball State	0	0	2	1973, 1975
Indiana State	0	0	2	1974, 1976
East Stroudsburg	0	0	2	1975, 1976
Northern State	0	0	2	1975, 1976
UT Arlington	0	0	2	1976, 1977
Sacramento State	0	0	2	1976, 1977
Auburn	0	1	2	2015, 2016
Arkansas	0	0	1	2026
Duke	0	0	1	2024
Hawaii	0	0	1	2010
James Madison	0	0	1	2021
Kent State	0	0	1	1990
Kentucky	0	0	1	2014
Ole Miss	0	0	1	2025
Mississippi State	0	0	1	2026
Northern Illinois	0	0	1	1988
Pacific (Note: This is the Division I institution in California, in full the University of the Pacific. The Division III institution in Oregon named Pacific University is referred to as "Pacific (OR)".)	0	0	1	1983
South Florida	0	0	1	2012
Toledo	0	0	1	1989
UConn	0	0	1	1993
UIC	0	0	1	1994
Virginia Tech	0	0	1	2008
St. Petersburg Junior College (FL)	0	0	1	1969
Black Hills State (SD)	0	0	1	1969
Midwestern (IA)	0	0	1	1970
Parsons (IA)	0	0	1	1971
Wartburg (IA)	0	0	1	1971
Wisconsin–Eau Claire (Note: Made only appearance as Wisconsin State University–Eau Claire.)	0	0	1	1971
South Dakota	0	0	1	1971
Southwest Baptist (MO)	0	0	1	1971
Buena Vista (IA)	0	0	1	1971
University of Tokyo–Nihon	0	1	1	1972
Keene State	0	0	1	1972
Purdue	0	0	1	1972
West Georgia	0	0	1	1974
Golden West College (CA)	0	0	1	1974
Winona State	0	0	1	1974
Nassau Community College (NY)	0	0	1	1974
Western Oregon (Note: Made only appearance as Oregon College of Education.)	0	0	1	1975
Northwest Missouri State	0	0	1	1975
Ohio	0	0	1	1975
Minnesota State (Note: Made only appearance as Mankato State.)	0	0	1	1975
Tarkio (MO)	0	0	1	1976
Northwestern Oklahoma State	0	0	1	1976
Mayville State (ND)	0	0	1	1976
West Chester (PA)	0	0	1	1977
Springfield (MA)	0	0	1	1977
Portland State	0	0	1	1978
Stephen F. Austin	0	0	1	1978
Chapman (CA)	0	0	1	1979
New Mexico State	0	0	1	1981
Ohio State	0	0	1	1982
Rhode Island	0	0	1	1982
U.S. International (CA) (Note: Now known as Alliant International; no longer sponsors athletics.)	0	0	1	1982

^{‡} UCLA's 1995 NCAA championship and Nebraska's 1985 runner-up finish were vacated by the NCAA and are not counted

=== Championships and appearances by conference ===
This listing excludes results of the pre-NCAA Women's College World Series of 1969 through 1982 (both Division I tournaments in 1982—AIAW and NCAA—were called "Women's College World Series").

Conference	Championships (Through 2026)	Title Game/Series Appearances (Through 2026)	WCWS appearances (Through 2026)
Pac-12 (Note: UCLA's 1995 WCWS participation & title were vacated by the NCAA and are not included in these figures; see above. The Pac-12, which adopted its current name on July 1, 2011, retains all historical records from its years as the Pac-10. The conference had adopted the "Pac-10" name in 1978, but did not begin sponsoring women's sports until the 1986–87 school year.)	24	39	99
SEC	5	12	61
Big 12	8	13	45
Big Ten	1	3	29
Big West (Note: The Big West Conference was known as the Pacific Coast Athletic Association until July 1988. Totals include all appearances by conference members under both names, but includes only appearances after the conference began sponsoring women's sports in 1984–85.)	1	4	22
ACC	1	3	13
Big Eight (Note: Nebraska's 1985 WCWS participation & title game appearance were vacated by the NCAA and are not included in these totals. The Big Eight merged with four teams from the Southwest Conference to form the Big 12 in 1996.) (Note: Conference is now defunct.)			12
WAC (Note: The Western Athletic Conference (WAC) did not sponsor women's sports until the 1990–91 academic year, after absorbing the High Country Athletic Conference (HCAC), a parallel women's-only conference. The WAC maintains all historic records from the HCAC; totals include Utah State's 1984 and Utah's 1985 appearances while in the HCAC. The WAC will rebrand as the United Athletic Conference after the 2026 season.)	1	2	11
Atlantic 10			6
Southwest (Note: Texas A&M won two titles in four title game and five WCWS appearances while they were still members of the Southwest Conference, which is now defunct. Texas A&M was a charter member of the Big 12 in 1996, but left for the Southeastern Conference in July 2012.)	2	4	5
Conference USA (Note: Following the breakup of the Metro in 1991 by Florida State, South Carolina, Cincinnati, and Memphis, the Metro and its breakaway Great Midwest Conference reunified in 1995 as Conference USA.)			5
Sun Belt			6
MAC			4
Metro			4
Southland			3
Big East (Note: Although the American Conference inherited the charter of the original Big East Conference following the 2013 Big East split, the current Big East Conference maintains all athletic records of the original conference in all sports that it currently sponsors.)			3
Ivy			2
Missouri Valley (Note: Records include those of the Gateway Collegiate Athletic Conference when it was originally a women's-only conference parallel to the MVC. In 1985, after the MVC stopped sponsoring football, the Gateway took on football as its only men's sport. In 1992, the women's portion of the Gateway merged into the MVC, which maintains all historic records of Gateway women's sports. The football side of the conference maintained the Gateway charter, first as the Gateway Football Conference and now the Missouri Valley Football Conference.)			2
CAA			1
Independent			2
Summit League (Note: The Mid-Continent Conference adopted its current name of The Summit League in June 2007.)			1
NorPac (Note: The NorPac, in full the Northern Pacific Conference, was a women's-only conference that operated from 1982 to 1986. The conference disbanded when the then-Pac-10, home to five of the final seven NorPac members, began sponsoring women's sports in 1986–87. The remaining two schools, which were members of the PCAA for men's sports, moved their women's sports to that conference.)		1	3
North Star (Note: The North Star Conference was a women's-only conference that merged into the Mid-Continent Conference, now The Summit League, in 1992. The Summit maintains all historic records of North Star sports.)			1
WCAA (Note: The WCAA, in full the Western Collegiate Athletic Association, was a women's-only conference that operated from 1981 to 1986. Its final five members were all members of the conference known at the time as the Pac-10 and moved their women's sports to that league.)	3	3	6

=== Championships coaches ===
Updated through 2026 World Series

Coach	NCAA Championships (Through 2026)	Title Game/Series Appearances (Through 2026)	WCWS Appearances (Through 2026)	Schools
Mike Candrea	8 (1991, 1993, 1994, 1996, 1997, 2001, 2006, 2007)	13	23	Arizona
Patty Gasso	8 (2000, 2013, 2016, 2017, 2021, 2022, 2023, 2024)	10	17	Oklahoma
Sharron Backus (Note: Sharron Backus also coached UCLA to the AIAW WCWS championship in 1978.)	7 (1982, 1984, 1985, 1988, 1989, 1990, 1992)	12	14	UCLA
Sue Enquist (Note: UCLA's 1995 WCWS participation & title were vacated by the NCAA and are not included in these figures; see above. The Pac-12, which adopted its current name on July 1, 2011, retains all historical records from its years as the Pac-10. The conference had adopted the "Pac-10" name in 1978, but did not begin sponsoring women's sports until the 1986–87 school year.)	6 (1989, 1990, 1992, 1999, 2003, 2004)	13	16	UCLA
Bob Brock (Note: Bob Brock also coached Texas A&M to the AIAW WCWS championship in 1982.)	2 (1983, 1987)	4	5	Texas A&M
Clint Myers	2 (2008, 2011)	3	9	Arizona State
Clint Myers	2 (2008, 2011)	3	9	Auburn
Kelly Inouye-Perez	2 (2010, 2019)	2	10	UCLA
Tim Walton	2 (2014, 2015)	3	11	Florida
Mike White	2 (2025, 2026)	4	9	Texas
Lonni Alameda	1 (2018)	3	5	Florida State
Judi Garman (Note: Judi Garman also coached Cal State Fullerton to the AIAW WCWS final in 1981.)	1 (1986)	1	6	Cal State Fullerton
Carol Hutchins	1 (2005)	2	12	Michigan
Patrick Murphy	1 (2012)	2	15	Alabama
Diane Ninemire	1 (2002)	3	11	California
Heather Tarr	1 (2009)	2	8	Washington
Margie Wright	1 (1998)	4	10	Fresno State

== See also ==
- List of NCAA Division I softball programs
- Women's College World Series Most Outstanding Player
- College softball
- NCAA Division I softball tournament
- NCAA Division II Softball Championship
- NCAA Division III Softball Championship
- AIAW Intercollegiate Women's Softball Champions
