= 1981 Women's College World Series =

The 1981 AIAW Women's College World Series was held in Norman, Oklahoma on May 21–24. Sixteen Division I college softball teams met in the next-to-last AIAW fastpitch softball tournament of that organization's history. After playing their way through the regular season and regional tournaments, the 16 advancing teams met for the AIAW Division I college softball championship.

Defending champion Utah State won its second national championship by defeating Cal State Fullerton, 4-3, in the "if necessary" game to become the first repeat winner since Arizona State in 1973.

== Teams ==
The double-elimination tournament included these teams:

- California
- Cal State Fullerton
- Creighton
- Illinois State
- Michigan State
- Missouri
- New Mexico
- New Mexico State
- Oklahoma
- Oklahoma State
- Rutgers
- South Carolina
- Texas A&M
- UCLA
- Utah State
- Western Michigan

== Bracket ==
Upper round 1	Upper round 2	Upper round 3	Upper final	Final
UCLA	3
South Carolina	0
UCLA	0
Utah State	1
Utah State	2
Texas A&M	1
Utah State	4
Missouri	2
Missouri	3^{(12)}
Rutgers	0
Missouri	5
Oklahoma State	1
Michigan State	1
Oklahoma State	5
Utah State	2
Cal State–Fullerton	0
Western Michigan	2
Creighton	0
Western Michigan	0
Cal State–Fullerton	2^{(15)}
Cal State–Fullerton	7^{(8)}
New Mexico State	6
Cal State–Fullerton	1^{(10)}
California	0
California	3
Illinois State	0
California	4	Utah State	1	4
Oklahoma	1	Cal State–Fullerton	6	3
Oklahoma	1
New Mexico	0
Lower round 1	Lower round 2	Lower round 3	Lower round 4	Lower round 5	Lower final
Western Michigan	0
Missouri	0
South Carolina	0	Texas A&M	1^{(11)}
Texas A&M	3	Texas A&M	1
Texas A&M	4
Michigan State	2	Cal State–Fullerton	5
Oklahoma	1
Texas A&M	0	UCLA	4
Rutgers	2	Michigan State	8
UCLA	1
Michigan State	6
UCLA	2
California	0
Creighton	4^{(8)}	Creighton	1
UCLA	5	UCLA	2^{(9)}
New Mexico State	2
Oklahoma State	0
Oklahoma State	5
Illinois State	0	New Mexico	2
New Mexico	1

== Ranking ==
Place	School	WCWS Record
1st	Utah State	5-1
2nd	Cal State–Fullerton	5-2
3rd	UCLA	5-2
4th	Texas A&M	4-2
5th	California	2-2
5th	Missouri	2-2
7th	Michigan State	2-2
7th	Oklahoma State	2-2
9th	Creighton	1-2
9th	New Mexico	1-2
9th	Oklahoma	1-2
9th	Western Michigan	1-2
13th	Illinois State	0-2
13th	New Mexico State	0-2
13th	Rutgers	0-2
13th	South Carolina	0-2
