= Weber State Wildcats =

- University: Weber State University
- Conference: Big Sky
- NCAA: Division I (FCS)
- Athletic director: Tim Crompton
- Location: Ogden, Utah
- Varsity teams: 16 (7 men's and 9 women's)
- Football stadium: Elizabeth Dee Shaw Stewart Stadium
- Basketball arena: Dee Events Center
- Softball stadium: Wildcat Softball Field
- Soccer stadium: Wildcat Soccer Field
- Other venues: Swenson Gymnasium (volleyball, indoor track)
- Mascot: Waldo the Wildcat
- Nickname: Wildcats
- Colors: Purple and white
- Website: weberstatesports.com

The Weber State Wildcats are the varsity athletic teams representing Weber State University in Ogden, Utah in intercollegiate athletics, sponsoring 16 teams. The Wildcats compete in NCAA Division I FCS and are charter members (1963) of the Big Sky Conference. The mascot is Waldo the Wildcat and team colors are purple and white, with black as an accessory color.

== Sports sponsored ==
Men's sports	Women's sports
Basketball	Basketball
Cross country	Cross country
Football	Golf
Golf	Soccer
Tennis	Softball
Track and field^{†}	Tennis
	Track and field^{†}
	Volleyball
† – Track and field includes both indoor and outdoor

=== Football ===
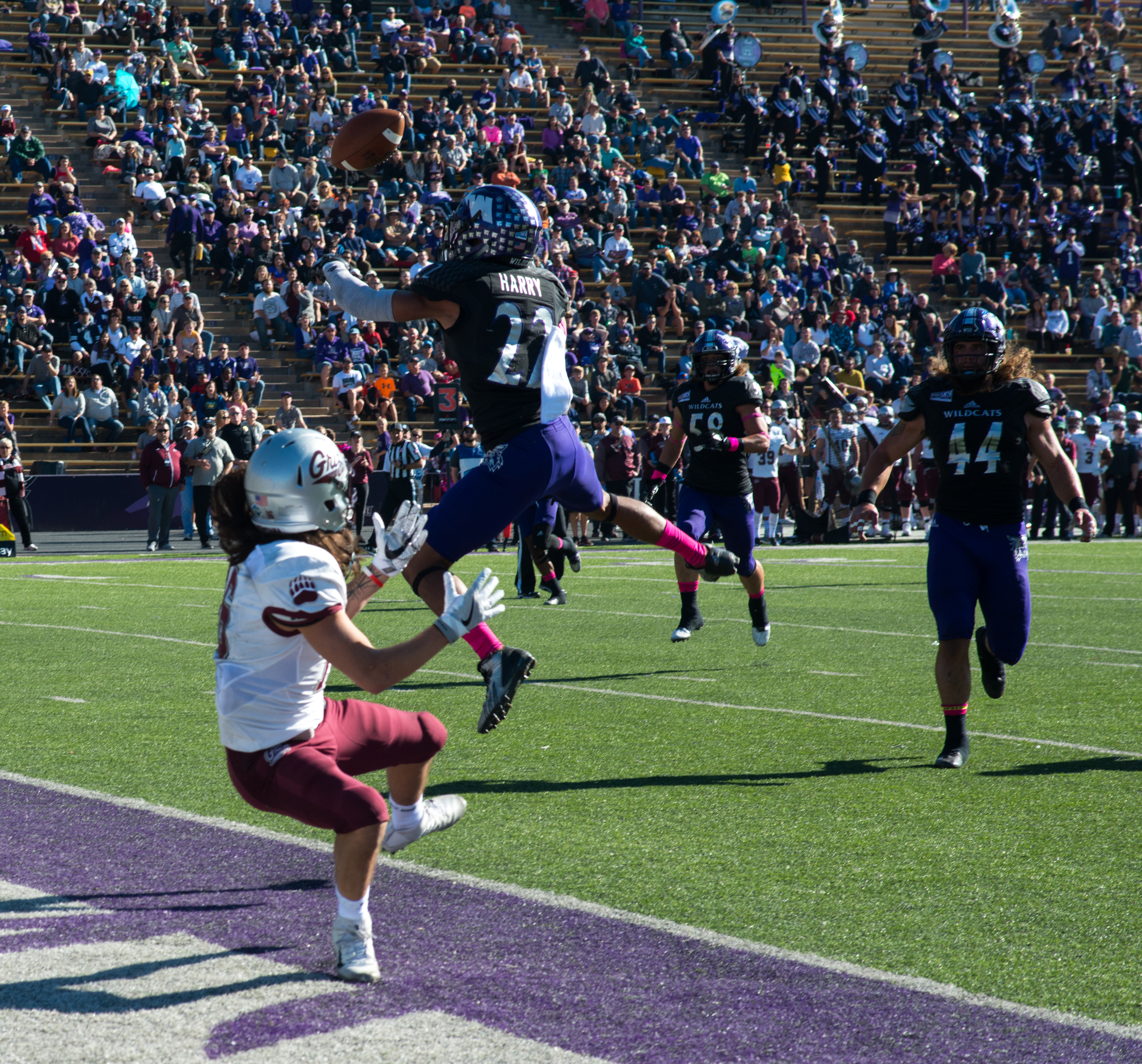
Weber (in black) v Montana football game in 2017

The football team plays in the NCAA Division I Football Championship Subdivision (FCS). The football team recently changed leadership, with the addition of new head coach Ron McBride, former head coach of the University of Utah, who began coaching the Wildcats in 2005. Coach "Mac" went 6–5 overall and 4–3 in conference play his first year with the ‘Cats.

The 2008 season, the 'Cats finished 7–1 in conference which is the best single season record in school history. Overall they finished 10–4 and lost in the NCAA Division I Football Championship Playoff Quarterfinals. Ron McBride retired after the 2011 season. John L. Smith was hired in his place, but left to take the head coaching job in Arkansas before coaching even one game. Weber State hired Jody Sears as an interim head coach for the 2012 season, and was fired at the end of the 2013 season. The Wildcats hired coach Jay Hill at the start of the 2014 season.

=== Basketball ===
==== Men's team ====
Weber State's men's basketball team (1,004–572), long hailed as a powerhouse in the Big Sky Conference, acquired new head coach Randy Rahe for the 2006–2007 season. WSU Men's basketball team has the 24th highest winning percentage in NCAA Division I history. In 2005, Street and Smith magazine compiled a list of the greatest basketball programs in college basketball history, WSU made #51. The men's basketball team won its 18th overall Big Sky Conference championship in 2009. WSU is also famous for first round NCAA tournament upsets. In 1995, Weber beat #3 seed Michigan State, and defeated #3 seed North Carolina in 1999.

==== Women's team ====
Big Sky Conference logo in Weber State's colors

The women's team was in the NCAA tournament in 2001 and 2002, along with a Women's Basketball Invitational (WBI) appearance in 2016.

=== Softball ===
Weber State's softball team has appeared in the NCAA Division I softball tournament five times, in 1973, 1974, 1975, 2019 and 2025. WSU got their first NCAA Tournament win in 2019 over Cal State Fullerton.
