= 1970 Women's College World Series =

The 1970 Women's College World Series of softball. It was organized by the Omaha Softball Association and recognized by the Division for Girls' and Women's Sports (DGWS) as a championship tournament. Softball teams from 17 schools met on May 15–17 at the George W. Dill Softball Center at Benson Park in Omaha, Nebraska.

The John F. Kennedy College Patriettes won their second consecutive college softball championship by winning five of their six games, defeating Southwest Missouri State in the final if-necessary game, 7–6.

== Teams ==
The double-elimination tournament included these teams:

Team	Appearance
Concordia (NE)	1st
Illinois State	2nd
John F. Kennedy	2nd
Kearney State	2nd
Luther College (IA)	1st
Midland Lutheran (NE)	1st
Midwestern College (IA)	1st
Minnesota–Duluth	1st
Minot State	1st
Nebraska	1st
Nebraska–Omaha	2nd
Northern Colorado	2nd
Southern Illinois	1st
Southwest Missouri State	2nd
Upper Iowa	1st
Wayne State (NE)	1st
Western Illinois	1st

== Bracket ==
The bracket included 17 teams with results as shown.

Upper round 1	Upper round 2	Upper round 3	Upper round 4	Upper final	Final
John F. Kennedy	2
Upper Iowa	0
John F. Kennedy	10
Western Illinois	0
Western Illinois	2
Wayne State	1
John F. Kennedy	4
Southwest Missouri State	1
Southwest Missouri State	4
Nebraska	1
Southwest Missouri State	8
Southern Illinois	3
Southern Illinois	7
Minnesota-Duluth	6
John F. Kennedy	8
Nebraska-Omaha	1
Nebraska-Omaha	9
Nebraska-Omaha	3	Minot State	2
Nebraska-Omaha	10
Luther College	0
Northern Colorado	2
Northern Colorado	7
Kearney State	1
Nebraska-Omaha	7
Illinois State	5
Illinois State	24
Concordia	5
Illinois State	10
John F. Kennedy	0	7
Midwestern	4
Midwestern	10	Southwest Missouri State	2	6
Midland Lutheran	7
Lower round 1	Lower round 2	Lower round 3	Lower round 4	Lower round 5	Lower round 6	Lower final
Midland Lutheran	0
Western Illinois	0
Midland Lutheran	9	Western Illinois	10
Western Illinois	6	Illinois State	8
Concordia	8
Kearney State	2	Southwest Missouri State	13 (Note: The Missouri State Softball Media Guide lists this score as 14–1.)
Kearney State	7
Illinois State	2	Nebraska-Omaha	1
Kearney State	10	Southern Illinois	6
Southwest Missouri State	3
Minot State	3
Minnesota-Duluth	1
Luther College	1
Minnesota-Duluth	8	Northern Colorado	0
Minnesota-Duluth	7	Southwest Missouri State	11
Nebraska	1
Luther College	10
Luther College	17
Luther College	16	Midwestern	7
Luther College	W	Upper Iowa	1
Wayne State	L

== Ranking ==
Place	School	WCWS Record
1st	John F. Kennedy College	5–1
2nd	Southwest Missouri State	6–2
3rd	Nebraska–Omaha	4–2
4th	Illinois State	3–2
5th	Western Illinois	3–2
5th	Luther College	4–2
7th	Kearney State	2–2
7th	Minnesota–Duluth	2–2
9th	Midland Lutheran College	1–2
9th	Northern Colorado	1–2
9th	Southern Illinois	1–2
9th	Midwestern College	1–2
13th	Minot State College	0–2
13th	Wayne State College	0–2
13th	Concordia Teachers College	0–2
13th	Nebraska	0–2
13th	Upper Iowa	0–2
