= 1980 Women's College World Series =

The 1980 Women's College World Series (WCWS) was held in Norman, Oklahoma on May 22–25, the first time it was played at a location other than Omaha, Nebraska, where it had been held for its first 11 years. Sixteen fastpitch softball teams emerged from regional tournaments to meet in the AIAW national collegiate softball championship.

== Teams ==
The 1980 season was the first time that AIAW softball competition was split into three divisions (I, II and III) with each conducting its own championship tournament. The Division I double-elimination tournament included these teams:

- Cal Poly–Pomona
- Cal State–Fullerton
- California
- Creighton
- Indiana
- Massachusetts
- New Mexico
- Oklahoma
- Oklahoma State
- Oregon
- South Carolina
- Southwest Missouri State
- Texas A&M
- Utah State
- Western Illinois
- Western Michigan

The Utah State Aggies, behind the pitching of Mary Lou Ramm, won its first national championship, emerging from the losers' bracket to defeat Indiana with 1–0 and 2–1 wins in the final. Ramm was named the Most Outstanding Player of the tournament. Utah State's only loss had been to Indiana in the fourth round, forcing the Aggies to defeat top-seeded Texas A&M in order to again face the Hoosiers in the final.

== Bracket ==
Upper round 1	Upper round 2	Upper round 3	Upper final	Final
Texas A&M	1
Southwest Missouri State	0
Texas A&M	0
Indiana	1
Indiana	5
South Carolina	2
Indiana	8
Oklahoma State	0
Oklahoma State	5
Western Michigan	4
Oklahoma State	1
Cal Poly–Pomona	0
New Mexico	1
Cal Poly–Pomona	3
Indiana	3
Utah State	2
Oregon	7
Massachusetts	3
Oregon	0
Utah State	5
Utah State	4
California	1
Utah State	2
Western Illinois	0
Western Illinois	1
Oklahoma	0
Western Illinois	2	Indiana	0	1
Cal State–Fullerton	0	Utah State	1	2
Cal State–Fullerton	5
Creighton	0
Lower round 1	Lower round 2	Lower round 3	Lower round 4	Lower round 5	Lower final
Oregon	2
Oklahoma State	0
Southwest Missouri State	4	Southwest Missouri State	1
Oregon	0	Western Michigan	1
South Carolina	0
Western Michigan	1	Utah State	1
Cal State–Fullerton	2
Western Michigan	0	Texas A&M	0
Western Michigan	1	Western Michigan	3
Texas A&M	1
New Mexico	0
Texas A&M	1
Western Illinois	0
Massachusetts	0	California	0
Texas A&M	3	Texas A&M	2
California	2
Cal Poly–Pomona	2
Cal Poly–Pomona	3
Oklahoma	0	Creighton	0
Creighton	3

== Ranking ==
Place	School	WCWS Record
1st	Utah State	6–1
2nd	Indiana	4–2
3rd	Texas A&M	5–2
4th	Western Michigan	4–2
5th	Oklahoma State	2–2
5th	Western Illinois	2–2
7th	Oregon	2–2
7th	Cal Poly–Pomona	2–2
9th	Cal State–Fullerton	1–2
9th	California	1–2
9th	Creighton	1–2
9th	Southwest Missouri State	1–2
13th	South Carolina	0–2
13th	New Mexico	0–2
13th	Massachusetts	0–2
13th	Oklahoma	0–2
