= 1971 Women's College World Series =

Women's softball tournament

The 1971 ASA/DGWS Women's College World Series (WCWS), the third in its history, was held in Omaha, Nebraska. On May 13–16, softball teams from 27 colleges met in that year's national fastpitch softball tournament, still the largest number of teams to play in a single-site WCWS. The tournament consisted of 53 games.

The John F. Kennedy College Patriettes won their third consecutive national championship, this time from the loser's bracket, by shutting out the Iowa State Cyclonettes twice in the final, 6–0 and 4–0. Paula Miller of Arizona State was named the tournament's Most Valuable Player, pitching all of ASU's seven games. Iowa State's result occurred despite having zero funding from the university.

== Teams ==
The double-elimination tournament included these teams:

Team	Appearance
Arizona State	1st
Buena Vista College (IA)	1st
Central Missouri State	1st
Concordia (NE)	2nd
Eastern Illinois	1st
Illinois State	3rd
Iowa State	1st
John F. Kennedy	3rd
Kansas State Teachers College (now Emporia State)	1st
Kearney State	3rd
Luther College (IA)	2nd
Midland Lutheran (NE)	2nd
Minnesota–Duluth	2nd
Minot State	2nd
Nebraska	2nd
Nebraska–Omaha	3rd
Northern Colorado	3rd
Parsons College (IA)	1st
South Dakota	1st
South Dakota State	1st
Southern Illinois	2nd
Southwest Baptist (MO)	1st
Southwest Missouri State	3rd
Upper Iowa	2nd
Wartburg College (IA)	1st
Wayne State (NE)	2nd
Wisconsin State–Eau Claire	1st

== Bracket ==
The individual game results are shown in the tournament bracket below.

Upper round 1	Upper round 2	Upper round 3	Upper round 4	Upper final	Final
John F. Kennedy	16
South Dakota State	6	South Dakota State	0
Central Missouri	5	John F. Kennedy	7^{(8)}
Arizona State	14	Arizona State	6
Luther College	0	Arizona State	11
Nebraska	12	Nebraska	0
Midland Lutheran	2	John F. Kennedy	6
Iowa State	12	Iowa State	7
Southwest Baptist	2	Iowa State	3
Northern Colorado	6 (Note: no-hitter)	Northern Colorado	2
Wisconsin St.–Eau Claire	0	Iowa State	8
Illinois State	–	Illinois State	1
–	Illinois State	9
Minnesota–Duluth	4
Iowa State	12
Southwest Missouri	9
Southwest Missouri	6
Wartburg College	6	Wartburg College	0
Minot State	2	Southwest Missouri	14
Parsons College	11	Parsons College	11
Wayne State	1	Parsons College	7
Eastern Illinois	6	Eastern Illinois	6
Buena Vista College	1	Southwest Missouri	3
South Dakota	3	KS State Teach. Coll.	0
Upper Iowa	5	Upper Iowa	5
Kearney State	8	Southern Illinois	8
Southern Illinois	18	Southern Illinois	8	Iowa State	0	0
Nebraska–Omaha	9	KS State Teach. Coll.	18	John F. Kennedy	6	4
Concordia	1	Nebraska–Omaha	0
KS State Teach. Coll.	12
Lower round 1	Lower round 2	Lower round 3	Lower round 4	Lower round 5	Lower round 6	Lower round 7	Lower final
Luther College	9	Luther College	11	Luther College	0
Midland Lutheran	2	Upper Iowa	1	Luther College	9	Illinois State	10	KS State Teach. Coll.	0
Central Missouri	5	Central Missouri	3	Illinois State	0	Arizona State	1
Nebraska–Omaha	3	Arizona State	4
Southwest Baptist	4	Eastern Illinois	3	Eastern Illinois	0	Southwest Missouri	0
Wisconsin St.–Eau Claire	6	Wisconsin St.–Eau Claire	2	Eastern Illinois	5	Arizona State	10	Arizona State	3	John F. Kennedy	3
–	Wartburg College	2	John F. Kennedy	5
Wartburg College	–
Wayne State	10	Wayne State	6	Northern Colorado	4
Buena Vista College	5	Northern Colorado	38	Northern Colorado	12	Southern Illinois	5	John F. Kennedy	16
Minot State	8	Minot State	0	Southern Illinois	11	Nebraska	2
Minnesota–Duluth	2	Nebraska	12
Kearney State	12	Kearney State	10	Parsons College	3
South Dakota	2	Nebraska	11	Nebraska	9	Nebraska	6
Concordia	9	Concordia	1
South Dakota State	3

== Ranking ==
Place	School	WCWS Record
By finish:
1st	John F. Kennedy College	7–1
2nd	Iowa State	5–2
3rd	Southwest Missouri State College	3–2
4th	Arizona State	5–2
4th	Nebraska	5–2
6th	Kansas State Teachers College	2–2
By record:
	Southern Illinois	3–2
	Eastern Illinois	3–2
	Northern Colorado	3–2
	Luther College	3–2
	Illinois State	2–2
	Parsons College	2–2
	Wartburg College	1–2
	Central Missouri State College	1–2
	Minot State College	1–2
	Concordia Teachers College	1–2
	Wisconsin State–Eau Claire	1–2
	Kearney State College	1–2
	Upper Iowa	1–2
	Nebraska–Omaha	1–2
	South Dakota State	1–2
	Wayne State College	1–2
	Minnesota–Duluth	0–2
	South Dakota	0–2
	Midland Lutheran College	0–2
	Southwest Baptist College	0–2
	Buena Vista College	0–2
