= 1975 Women's College World Series =

The 1975 Women's College World Series (WCWS) was contested among 18 college softball teams on May 15–18 at Dill Field in Omaha, Nebraska. This was the seventh WCWS.

After losing the opener of the final, the University of Nebraska–Omaha Maverettes defeated Northern Iowa, 6–4, in the deciding game to win the 1975 championship. Connie Claussen, the tournament director for the first eleven editions of the WCWS, was also the coach of the victorious Nebraska–Omaha team.

== Teams ==
The double elimination tournament included these teams:

| Team | Appearance |
|---|---|
| Arizona | 2nd |
| Ball State | 2nd |
| East Stroudsburg State (PA) | 1st |
| Kansas | 3rd |
| Mankato State (MN) | 1st |
| Michigan State | 3rd |
| Nebraska–Omaha | 6th |
| North Dakota State | 3rd |
| Northern Colorado | 7th |
| Northern Iowa | 2nd |
| Northern State (SD) | 1st |
| Northwest Missouri State | 1st |
| Ohio | 1st |
| Oklahoma | 1st |
| Oregon College of Education (now Western Oregon) | 1st |
| Texas Woman's | 1st |
| Weber State | 3rd |
| Western Illinois | 4th |

== Bracket ==
Upper round 1 | Upper round 2 | Upper round 3 | Upper round 4 | Upper final | Final
Oregon College of Education | 14
Oregon College of Education | 6 | Ball State | 9
Oregon College of Education | 0
Texas Woman's | 2
Nebraska–Omaha | 1
Nebraska–Omaha | 18
Northern State College | 0
Nebraska–Omaha | 4
Western Illinois | 2
Northern Colorado | 1
North Dakota State | 0
Northern Colorado | 4
Western Illinois | 5
Western Illinois | 1
Mankato State | 0
Nebraska–Omaha | 1
Northern Iowa | 0
Michigan State | 3
Northwest Missouri State | 1
Michigan State | 3
Northern Iowa | 4
Northern Iowa | 5
Oklahoma | 0
Northern Iowa | 4
Kansas | 1
Kansas | 6
Weber State | 2
Kansas | 4
Nebraska–Omaha | 1 | 6
Arizona | 3
East Stroudsburg | 3 | Northern Iowa | 11 | 4
East Stroudsburg | 8 | Arizona | 4
Ohio | 0
Lower round 1 | Lower round 2 | Lower round 3 | Lower round 4 | Lower round 5 | Lower round 6 | Lower final
Northwest Missouri State | 0
Northern Colorado | 6
Texas Woman's | 3 | Northern Colorado | 6
Northern Colorado | 1 | Kansas | 0
Texas Woman's | 9 | Northwest Missouri State | 14
Oregon College of Education | 0 | Michigan State | 3
Oklahoma | 2 | Weber State | 7
Northern Colorado | 3 | Northern Iowa | 7
East Stroudsburg | 6 | Oregon College of Education | 8
Michigan State | 4
Weber State | 7
Ohio | 0
Michigan State | 5
Ohio | 6 | Michigan State | 17
Michigan State | 3 | Western Illinois | 0
Ohio | 10 | North Dakota State | 1
Arizona | 2
Mankato State | 2 | Ball State | 4
Ball State | 6 | Arizona | 10
Northern State College | 2

== Ranking ==
| Place | School | WCWS Record |
|---|---|---|
| 1st | Nebraska–Omaha | 5-1 |
| 2nd | Northern Iowa | 5-2 |
| 3rd | Michigan State | 5-2 |
| 4th | Northern Colorado | 4-2 |
| 5th | Kansas | 2-2 |
| 6th | Western Illinois | 2-2 |
| 7th | Oregon College of Education | 3-2 |
| 7th | Arizona | 2-2 |
| 9th | Weber State College | 1-2 |
| 9th | Northwest Missouri State | 1-2 |
| 9th | Ball State | 1-2 |
| 9th | Ohio | 2-2 |
| 13th | Texas Woman's | 1-2 |
| 13th | North Dakota State | 0-2 |
| 13th | East Stroudsburg State | 1-2 |
| 13th | Northern State College | 0-2 |
| 13th | Oklahoma | 0-2 |
| 13th | Mankato State | 0-2 |
