= 1972 Women's College World Series =

Softball tournament

The 1972 Women's College World Series (WCWS) was contested among 16 college softball teams on May 18–21 in Omaha, Nebraska. This fourth WCWS was notable for the only appearance of a team from outside the United States, as the team from Tokyo–Nihon University of Japan proved to be a hit with both spectators and the other teams in the tournament.

Three-time defending champion John F. Kennedy College was excluded from the tournament by an organizational rule change the previous month. The new rule prohibited a team from appearing in the WCWS if it gave scholarships to any women athletes, not just softball players (JFK College openly awarded women's basketball scholarships). JFK never returned to the WCWS, and the school closed just three years later.

The Arizona State Sun Devilettes defeated Tokyo–Nihon narrowly in the winners' bracket semi-final, 2–1, and split the tournament final, 0–1 and 8–5, with the if-necessary game requiring 11 innings.

== Teams ==
The double elimination tournament included these teams:

Team	Appearance
Arizona State	2nd
Central Missouri State	2nd
Illinois State	4th
Kansas State Teachers College (now Emporia State)	2nd
Keene State College (NH)	3rd
Luther College (IA)	3rd
Minot State	3rd
Nebraska–Omaha	4th
Northern Colorado	4th
Purdue	1st
South Carolina	1st
South Dakota State	2nd
Southwest Missouri State	4th
Tokyo–Nihon University (Japan)	1st
Wayne State (NE)	2nd
Western Illinois	2nd

== Bracket ==
Upper round 1	Upper round 2	Upper round 3	Upper final	Final
Tokyo–Nihon	4
Central Missouri State College	0
Tokyo–Nihon	3
Illinois State	2
Illinois State	8
Kansas State Teachers College	0
Tokyo–Nihon	6
South Dakota State	0
South Dakota State	3
Luther College	2
South Dakota State	5
Keene State College	0
Keene State College	10
Purdue	3
Tokyo–Nihon	1
Arizona State	2
Southwest Missouri State	7
Nebraska–Omaha	2
Southwest Missouri State	2
Northern Colorado	4
Northern Colorado	5
South Carolina	2
Northern Colorado	1
Arizona State	11
Arizona State	11
Minot State College	0
Arizona State	3	Arizona State	0	8^{(11)}
Western Illinois	0	Tokyo–Nihon	1	5
Western Illinois	12
Wayne State College	4
Lower round 1	Lower round 2	Lower round 3	Lower round 4	Lower round 5	Lower final
Central Missouri State College	9
Western Illinois	8
Central Missouri State College	8	Southwest Missouri State	3
Central Missouri State College	4	South Dakota State	3
Kansas State Teachers College	4
Western Illinois	9	Western Illinois	0
Luther College	2
Western Illinois	2	Tokyo–Nihon	4
Luther College	6	Western Illinois	7
Illinois State	1 (Note: no-hitter by Illinois State pitcher, Margie Wright; lost)
Purdue	1
Nebraska–Omaha	1
Illinois State	11
Nebraska–Omaha	6	Illinois State	4
Illinois State	10	Northern Colorado	4
South Carolina	0
Wayne State College	0
Wayne State College	15
Minot State College	6	Keene State College	0
Wayne State College	10

== Ranking ==
Place	School	WCWS Record
1st	Arizona State	5-1
2nd	Tokyo–Nihon	5-2
3rd	Western Illinois	5-2
4th	Illinois State	4-2
5th	Northern Colorado	2-2
6th	South Dakota State	2-2
7th	Wayne State College	2-2
7th	Central Missouri State College	2-2
9th	Keene State College	1-2
9th	Nebraska–Omaha	1-2
9th	Luther College	1-2
9th	Southwest Missouri State	1-2
13th	South Carolina	0-2
13th	Minot State College	0-2
13th	Kansas State Teachers College	0-2
13th	Purdue	0-2
