= 1974 Women's College World Series =

College softball championship tournament

The 1974 Women's College World Series (WCWS) was contested among 18 college softball teams on May 16–19 in Omaha, Nebraska. This was the sixth WCWS.

Southwest Missouri State won all five of its games to win the national championship, defeating Northern Colorado in the final, 14–7.

== Teams ==
The double elimination tournament included these teams:

Team	Appearance
Arizona	1st
Eastern Illinois	2nd
Golden West College (CA)	1st
Indiana State	1st
Kansas	2nd
Luther College (IA)	4th
Massachusetts	1st
Michigan State	2nd
Nassau Community College (NY)	1st
North Dakota State	2nd
Northern Colorado	6th
South Carolina	3rd
South Dakota State	4th
Southwest Missouri State	6th
Wayne State (NE)	4th
Weber State	2nd
West Georgia	1st
Winona State (MN)	1st

== Bracket ==
Upper round 1	Upper round 2	Upper round 3	Upper round 4	Upper final	Final
Luther College	2
Luther College	4	Nassau Community College	0
Luther College	0
North Dakota State	1
Southwest Missouri State	1
Southwest Missouri State	11
Massachusetts	1
Southwest Missouri State	9
Eastern Illinois	8
Eastern Illinois	10
South Carolina	0
Eastern Illinois	9
Indiana State	0
Indiana State	10
South Dakota State	0
Southwest Missouri State	8
Wayne State College	5
Wayne State College	4
Michigan State	3
Wayne State College	2
Arizona	0
Arizona	16
West Georgia College	0
Wayne State College	23 (Note: Of interest, in their previous meeting in the 1971 WCWS, Northern Colorado defeated Wayne State by a score of 38-6.)
Northern Colorado	7
Northern Colorado	7
Weber State College	2
Northern Colorado	1
Southwest Missouri State	14	–
Kansas	0
Kansas	2	Northern Colorado	7	–
Kansas	10	Golden West College	1
Winona State College	0
Lower round 1	Lower round 2	Lower round 3	Lower round 4	Lower round 5	Lower round 6	Lower final
Michigan State	2
Indiana State	0
Michigan State	6	Indiana State	4
Indiana State	3	Northern Colorado	1
Michigan State	1	West Georgia College	2
Luther College	2	Northern Colorado	9
North Dakota State	0	Weber State College	2
Northern Colorado	18	Wayne State College	8
Weber State College	5	Luther College	5
Kansas	0
Golden West College	0
South Dakota State	0
Kansas	2
South Dakota State	2	Arizona	18
Arizona	1	Eastern Illinois	0
South Dakota State	5	South Carolina	1
Kansas	8
Winona State College	1	Massachusetts	3
Massachusetts	7	Kansas	13
Nassau Community College	0

== Ranking ==
Place	School	WCWS Record
1st	Southwest Missouri State	5-0
2nd	Northern Colorado	5-2
3rd	Wayne State College	3-2
4th	Kansas	5-2
5th	Eastern Illinois	2-2
6th	Indiana State	3-2
7th	Arizona	2-2
7th	Luther College	3-2
9th	Michigan State	2-2
9th	South Dakota State	2-2
9th	Massachusetts	1-2
9th	Weber State College	1-2
13th	West Georgia College	0-2
13th	South Carolina	0-2
13th	Golden West College	0-2
13th	North Dakota State	0-2
13th	Winona State College	0-2
13th	Nassau Community College	0-2
