= 1977 Women's College World Series =

The 1977 Women's College World Series (WCWS) was held in Omaha, Nebraska on May 25–29. Sixteen college softball teams met in the AIAW fastpitch softball tournament. This was the first WCWS in which regional tournaments were conducted for teams to qualify for the final tournament.

After appearing in three previous WCWS in 1973, 1975, and 1976, Northern Iowa won its first national championship by defeating Arizona, 7-0, in the "if necessary" game behind pitcher Pat Stockman.

== Teams ==
The double-elimination tournament included these teams:

Team	Appearance
Arizona	3rd
Arizona State	5th
Cal State–Sacramento	2nd
Kansas	5th
Michigan State	5th
Nebraska–Omaha	8th
Northern Colorado	9th
Northern Iowa	4th
Oklahoma State	1st
Oregon State	1st
Southern Illinois	3rd
Southwest Missouri State	7th
Springfield College (MA)	1st
Texas–Arlington	2nd
West Chester State (PA)	1st
Western Illinois	5th

== Bracket ==
Upper round 1	Upper round 2	Upper round 3	Upper final	Final
Nebraska–Omaha	6
Western Illinois	0
Nebraska–Omaha	4
Arizona	7
Arizona	4
Texas–Arlington	3
Arizona	1
Arizona State	0
Southwest Missouri State	5
Springfield College	2
Southwest Missouri State	0
Arizona State	2
Arizona State	2^{(9)}
CSU–Sacramento	1
Arizona	0
Northern Iowa	1^{(8)}
Northern Iowa	3
Southern Illinois	0
Northern Iowa	4
Kansas	0
Kansas	1
Oklahoma State	0
Northern Iowa	7
Michigan State	3
Michigan State	6
West Chester State	2
Michigan State	5^{(8)}	Northern Iowa	0	7
Northern Colorado	4	Arizona	1^{(9)}	0
Northern Colorado	6
Oregon State	0
Lower round 1	Lower round 2	Lower round 3	Lower round 4	Lower round 5	Lower final
Northern Colorado	6
Arizona State	2
Western Illinois	1	Texas–Arlington	0
Northern Colorado	2	Northern Colorado (Note: Northern Colorado defeated Nebraska–Omaha in a 5th-place game, 3-0.)	0
Texas–Arlington	4
Kansas	1	Arizona	2
Kansas	5
Arizona State	2	Michigan State	1
Springfield College	0	CSU–Sacramento	1
Michigan State	3
CSU–Sacramento	6
Southwest Missouri State	3
Michigan State	5
Southern Illinois	2	Oklahoma State	1
Southwest Missouri State	1	Nebraska–Omaha	1
Oklahoma State	3
Nebraska–Omaha	2^{(10)}
Nebraska–Omaha	6
West Chester State	6	Oregon State	0
Oregon State	8

== Ranking ==
Place	School	WCWS Record
1st	Northern Iowa	5-1
2nd	Arizona	5-2
3rd	Michigan State	4-2
4th	Arizona State	3-2
5th	Northern Colorado	4-2
6th	Nebraska–Omaha	3-3 (Note: Northern Colorado defeated Nebraska–Omaha in a 5th-place game, 3-0.)
7th	Kansas	2-2
7th	Southwest Missouri State	2-2
9th	Texas–Arlington	1-2
9th	CSU–Sacramento	1-2
9th	Oklahoma State	1-2
9th	Oregon State	1-2
13th	Southern Illinois	0-2
13th	West Chester State	0-2
13th	Springfield College	0-2
13th	Western Illinois	0-2
