= Weber State Wildcats tennis =

The Weber State Wildcats men's tennis team is the men's tennis program that represents Weber State University in Ogden, Utah. The team competes in the Big Sky Conference of the Division 1 National Collegiate Athletic Association (NCAA). The Wildcats play home tennis matches at the Edman Courts located on the university campus, which supports up to 1000 spectators.

In recent years, the team has had success competing in the Big Sky Conference. The Wildcats have won the regular season championship in 2014, 2015, and 2016. The Wildcats also won the Big Sky tournament championship in 2016, and played in the schools first ever Division 1 NCAA tournament against UCLA in Los Angeles. In 2014, the Wildcats went undefeated (10–0) in Big Sky play and won the regular season championship for the first time in over 20 years. In 2015, the Wildcats went 10–1, and took the regular season championship for the second consecutive year. In 2016, the Wildcats went 10–1 in Conference play, winning their third straight regular season championship, and won the schools first Big Sky tournament championship in over 24 years against the University of Idaho in Sacramento, California at the Big Sky Championships.

The Wildcats are coached by Brad Ferreira, who played for the Wildcats from 1986 to 1990, and helped lead the Wildcats to four consecutive Big Sky Championships. Since taking over the program in 2012, Ferreira has compiled a 35–6 Big Sky record, and has brought back three regular season titles to the Wildcats, and a Big Sky tournament championship. With such an impressive three year Big Sky resume, Ferreira was named the 2016 Big Sky Conference tennis coach of the year. Ferreira has recently been named the programs director of tennis for both Weber States men's and women's programs, and has hired Mark Roberts as a full-time assistant. Roberts has coaching experience as an assistant coach of women's programs at UNLV, Southern Methodist University, and UTEP. While coaching at UNLV from 2008 to 2012, Roberts was chosen as the Intercollegiate Tennis Association (ITA) Mountain Region Assistant Coach of the Year in 2010 and 2012. Roberts played collegiately at Boise State and New Mexico State and earned team MVP as a sophomore playing for Boise State before transferring to New Mexico State.

== 2014 season ==
In the 2014 season, the Wildcats were led by Jakub Gewart, Oliver Good, Todd Fought, Landon Barlow, Caio Poitena, and Sanjay Goswami. Each player had a dominant Big Sky record in helping achieve an undefeated Big Sky record.

== 2015 season ==
In the 2015 season, the Wildcats were led by Jakub Gewart, Todd Fought, Landon Barlow, Sanjay Goswami, Stefan Cooper, and Hou-En Chen. This crop of players helped bring the second consecutive regular season Big Sky championship to Weber State. The team was also awarded as the best athletic team at Weber State for the 2015 season.

== 2016 season ==
The Wildcats returned three Big Sky all-conference selections in Todd Fought, Landon Barlow and Jakub Gewart for the 2016 season. The 2016 season was one for the history books. The 'Cat's won both the regular season championship and the Big Sky Championship match in Sacramento, California against the University of Idaho by a narrow margin of 4–3. The senior trio of Todd Fought, Landon Barlow, and Sanjay Goswami led the Wildcats in securing all three singles wins necessary to clinch the title. The match ended with Sanjay Goswami clinching the win in a three-set battle when the match was tied three-all. With the win, the Wildcats won their first Big Sky Championship since 1992, and were invited for the first time in the program's history to the Division 1 NCAA tennis tournament. The Wildcats played UCLA, the number two ranked team in the country, in the first round of the tournament and lost 0–4.

== Scholarships ==
The Weber State tennis program is granted up to 4.5 scholarships from the NCAA. These can include up to the following: tuition, student fees, books, and room and board.
