= 1973 Women's College World Series =

The 1973 Women's College World Series was contested among 16 teams on May 17-20 in Omaha, Nebraska. It was the first series held under the auspices of the AIAW, which had recently been established by the Division of Girls' and Women's Sports (DGWS) for the purpose of conducting national championships.

Arizona State won its second consecutive WCWS championship, splitting the final two games with Illinois State, including the marathon final game that went 16 innings. Margie Wright pitched all 16 innings in that game for the Redbirds as they narrowly fell to Arizona State, 4-3. On the day of that final, Wright hurled 30 innings in three games. Ironically, for pitching too many innings in one day, a three-woman Illinois sports commission suspended her from pitching in any game in her upcoming senior season and also banned the softball team from post-season play in 1974.

== Teams ==
The double-elimination tournament included these teams:

Team	Appearance
Arizona State	3rd
Ball State	1st
Iowa State	2nd
Illinois State	5th
Kansas	1st
Michigan State	1st
Nebraska–Omaha	5th
North Dakota State	1st
Northern Colorado	5th
Northern Iowa	1st
South Carolina	2nd
South Dakota State	3rd
Southwest Missouri State	5th
Wayne State (NE)	3rd
Weber State	1st
Western Illinois	3rd

== Bracket ==
Upper round 1	Upper round 2	Upper round 3	Upper final	Final
Arizona State	4
Western Illinois	2
Arizona State	9
Northern Colorado	1
Northern Colorado	W
North Dakota State	L
Arizona State	1
Kansas	0
Kansas	4^{(9)}
Nebraska–Omaha	3
Kansas	5
Weber State	2
Weber State	W
South Carolina	L
Arizona State	9
Illinois State	2
Illinois State	2
Iowa State	1
Illinois State	10
Wayne State	0
Wayne State	3
South Dakota State	1
Illinois State	5
Southwest Missouri State	1
Michigan State	W
Northern Iowa	L
Michigan State	2	Arizona State	0	4^{(16)}
Southwest Missouri State	7	Illinois State	4	3
Southwest Missouri	12
Ball State	0
Lower round 1	Lower round 2	Lower round 3	Lower round 4	Lower round 5	Lower final
Northern Iowa	W
Northern Colorado	2
Ball State	3	Weber State	L
Northern Colorado	W	Kansas	1
Northern Iowa	7
Northern Iowa	L	Southwest Missouri State	1
South Dakota State	1
Northern Colorado	1	Illinois State	5
South Dakota State	7	Northern Colorado	5
Southwest Missouri State	5
Iowa State	4
Nebraska–Omaha	7
Western Illinois	2
Nebraska–Omaha	8	Michigan State	6
Nebraska–Omaha	1	Southwest Missouri State	3^{(10)}
South Carolina	4
Western Illinois	3
Western Illinois	14
Western Illinois	5	Wayne State	4
North Dakota State	0

== Ranking ==
Place	School	WCWS Record
1st	Arizona State	5-1
2nd	Illinois State	5-2
3rd	Southwest Missouri State	4-2
4th	Western Illinois	4-2
5th	Northern Colorado	3-2
6th	Kansas	2-2
7th	Northern Iowa	2-2
7th	Nebraska–Omaha	2-2
9th	South Dakota State	1-2
9th	Weber State College	1-2
9th	Michigan State	1-2
9th	Wayne State College	1-2
13th	Iowa State	0-2
13th	Ball State	0-2
13th	South Carolina	0-2
13th	North Dakota State	0-2
