= Margie Wright =

American former college softball coach

Biographical details
- Born: December 28, 1952 (age 73); Warrensburg, Illinois, U.S.

Playing career
- 1971–1974: Illinois State
- Position: Pitcher

Coaching career (HC unless noted)
- 1975–1977: Metamora Twp HS
- 1978–1979: Eastern Illinois (asst.)
- 1980–1985: Illinois State
- 1986–2012: Fresno State

Head coaching record
- Overall: 1,457–542–3 (.729)
- Tournaments: NCAA Division I: 76–50 (.603)

Accomplishments and honors

Championships
- Women's College World Series (1998); 3× WAC Tournament (1999, 2007, 2009); 10× WAC regular season (1996, 1998–2002, 2004–2006, 2009); 6× PCAA/Big West regular season (1987–1992); NorPac Tournament (1986); NorPac regular season (1986); Gateway Tournament (1985); 2× Gateway regular season (1984, 1985)

Marjorie Ann Wright (born December 28, 1952) is an American former college softball coach. She was the head coach of the Fresno State Bulldogs softball team from 1986 to 2012, and led them to the NCAA national softball championship in 1998. She is the NCAA's second all-time winningest softball coach. She also ranks second all-time in career victories among NCAA Division I coaches in all sports. She was inducted into the National Fastpitch Coaches Association Hall of Fame in 2000 and the International Women's Sports Hall of Fame in 2001. She retired at the end of the 2012 season.

== Athlete ==
Wright grew up in Warrensburg, Illinois and graduated from Warrensburg-Latham High School. She attended Illinois State University, where she was a pitcher for the 1973 Illinois State softball team that was the national runner-up at the AIAW Women's College World Series. Wright pitched all 16 innings in the title game as the Redbirds narrowly fell to Arizona State, 4-3. On the day of that final, Wright heroically hurled 30 innings in three games. For pitching too many innings in one day, a three-woman Illinois sports commission suspended her from pitching in any game in her upcoming senior season and also banned the softball team from post-season play in 1974. She also pitched a no-hitter in a loss in the semifinals of the 1972 Women's College World Series. Wright went on to pitch for the St. Louis Hummers in the women's professional softball league.

== Coaching career ==
=== Illinois State ===
Wright graduated from Illinois State in 1974. She became head softball coach at Metamora Township High School right after graduation. Wright then became an assistant softball coach at Eastern Illinois University in 1978. Returning to Illinois State, Wright began as head softball coach in 1980. In six years at Illinois State, Wright compiled a record of 163 wins, 92 losses, and 2 ties, including a 40-win season in 1981.

=== Fresno State ===
In 1985, Wright was hired by California State University, Fresno as its head softball coach, a position she held for 27 years. She led Fresno State to a national championship in 1998, the first national championship won by Fresno State in any team sport. As of 2009, she had coached 53 All-Americans, 16 Academic All-Americans, 11 NCAA team statistical champions, eight professionals, and 15 Olympians.

In 33 years as a head softball coach, Wright compiled a record of 1,457 wins, 542 losses and 3 ties. She is the NCAA's all-time winningest softball coach, and also ranks second all-time in career victories among NCAA Division I coaches in all sports, trailing only Texas Longhorns baseball coach (and Fresno State alumnus) Augie Garrido.

Wright's significant career milestones include:

- In March 1980, she won her first game as a head coach by a score of 6-0 over New Mexico.
- In March 1992, she achieved her 500th career victory with a 2-1 win over Arizona.
- In March 2000, she broke Judi Garman's mark as the all-time winningest softball coach with career victory No. 914, a 1-0 win over Oklahoma.
- In March 2002, she became the first softball coach to amass 1,000 wins with a 5-3 win over Boston University.
- In May 2008, she achieved her 1,300th win by a score of 3-2 against New Mexico State.
- In February 2010, Wright achieved her 600th win at Fresno State's home field, Bulldog Diamond.
- In May 2010, she took Fresno State to a record 29th straight NCAA softball tournament, ultimately losing to the 2010 national championship team from UCLA.

Wright has become a popular figure in the Fresno community and was inducted into the Fresno County Athletic Hall of Fame in 2008. Interviewed by the USA Today in May 2000, Wright said, "The city is great. I do a lot of speaking engagements out in the community, and I guess the people like what they hear. Certainly, if you're successful, they'll come out and support you."

Bulldog Diamond was renamed Margie Wright Diamond by Fresno State on May 3, 2014 in her honor.

=== Team USA ===
Wright served as an assistant coach on the United States women's softball team that won the gold medal at the 1996 Summer Olympics. She was the head coach of the United States women's national softball team that won a gold medal at the 1998 International Softball Federation Women's World Championship.

=== Youth softball ===
After leaving Fresno State, Wright became Director of Player Development for the Wheatland Spikes, a premier youth fastpitch softball program located in Aurora, Illinois.

== Hall of fame inductions ==
Wright was inducted into the National Fastpitch Coaches Association Hall of Fame in 2000. In 2001, she became the third softball individual to be inducted into the International Women's Sports Hall of Fame in New York. The International Women's Sports Hall of Fame was established by Billie Jean King in 1974 and honors individuals who have achieved outstanding success in athletics and had a significant impact on women's sports. On learning of her induction to the international hall, Wright said, "What I think is so special about this honor is it's not so much about the records and championships, but how someone has affected others through sports. It's an extremely prestigious award, and I'm very humble to receive [it]. It goes to all those athletes who've made life worthwhile."

Wright has also been inducted into the Illinois ASA Hall of Fame, the Illinois State University Athletic Hall of Fame, and the Fresno County Athletic Hall of Fame.

== Head coaching record ==
Record table
| Season | Team | Overall | Conference | Standing | Postseason |
|---|---|---|---|---|---|
Illinois State Redbirds (AIAW independent) (1980–1982)
| 1980 | Illinois State | 28–9–1 | | | Midwest AIAW Fourth Place |
| 1981 | Illinois State | 40–10 | | | Midwest AIAW Fourth Place |
| 1982 | Illinois State | 24–19–1 | | | Midwest AIAW Fourth Place |
Illinois State Redbirds (Gateway Conference) (1983–1985)
| 1983 | Illinois State | 16–16 | | 4th | |
| 1984 | Illinois State | 24–18 | 15–3 | 1st | |
| 1985 | Illinois State | 31–18 | 12–4 | 1st | |
| Illinois State: | | 163–92–2 | | | |
Fresno State Bulldogs (Nor-Pac Conference) (1986)
| 1986 | Fresno State | 38–16–1 | 8–2 | T–1st | NCAA Regional |
Fresno State Bulldogs (Pacific Coast Athletic Association/Big West Conference) (1987–1992)
| 1987 | Fresno State | 54–16 | 31–5 | T–1st | Women's College World Series |
| 1988 | Fresno State | 55–7 | 29–5 | 1st | WCWS Runners-Up |
| 1989 | Fresno State | 58–14 | 29–7 | 1st | WCWS Runners-Up |
| 1990 | Fresno State | 62–15 | 29–7 | 1st | WCWS Runners-Up |
| 1991 | Fresno State | 57–11 | 31–5 | 1st | Women's College World Series |
| 1992 | Fresno State | 52–16 | 26–10 | 1st | Women's College World Series |
Fresno State Bulldogs (Western Athletic Conference) (1993–2012)
| 1993 | Fresno State | 38–24 | 14–10 | 3rd | |
| 1994 | Fresno State | 49–16 | 21–5 | 3rd | Women's College World Series |
| 1995 | Fresno State | 50–19 | 18–8 | 3rd | NCAA Regionals |
| 1996 | Fresno State | 51–11 | 24–2 | 1st | NCAA Regionals |
| 1997 | Fresno State | 55–14 | 23–9 | 2nd | WCWS Semifinals |
| 1998 | Fresno State | 52–11 | 28–2 | 1st | WCWS Champions |
| 1999 | Fresno State | 65–10 | 24–0 | 1st | Women's College World Series |
| 2000 | Fresno State | 54–14 | 16–2 | 1st | NCAA Regionals |
| 2001 | Fresno State | 39–19 | 13–3 | 1st | NCAA Regionals |
| 2002 | Fresno State | 50–20 | 18–6 | 1st | NCAA Regionals |
| 2003 | Fresno State | 36–22 | 14–4 | 2nd | NCAA Regionals |
| 2004 | Fresno State | 48–20 | 20–4 | 1st | NCAA Regionals |
| 2005 | Fresno State | 43–12 | 17–1 | 1st | NCAA Regionals |
| 2006 | Fresno State | 37–19 | 12–3 | 1st | NCAA Regionals |
| 2007 | Fresno State | 47–18 | 15–3 | 2nd | NCAA Regionals |
| 2008 | Fresno State | 54–13 | 14–3 | 2nd | NCAA Regionals |
| 2009 | Fresno State | 38–20 | 15–5 | T–1st | NCAA Regionals |
| 2010 | Fresno State | 41–21 | 15–6 | 2nd | NCAA Regionals |
| 2011 | Fresno State | 35–19 | 15–6 | 2nd | NCAA Regionals |
| 2012 | Fresno State | 36–23 | 13–6 | 3rd | |
| Fresno State: | | 1,294–450–1 | | | |
| Total: | | 1,457–542–3 | | | |
National champion Postseason invitational champion Conference regular season champion Conference regular season and conference tournament champion Division regular season champion Division regular season and conference tournament champion Conference tournament champion

== See also ==
- National Fastpitch Coaches Association Hall of Fame
- List of college softball coaches with 1,000 wins
