= 1979 Women's College World Series =

The 1979 AIAW Women's College World Series (WCWS) was held in Omaha, Nebraska on May 24–27. Sixteen fastpitch softball teams emerged from regional tournaments to meet in the national collegiate softball championship.

== Teams ==
The double-elimination tournament included these teams:

- Arizona
- Arizona State
- Cal Poly–Pomona
- Chapman College (California)
- Emporia State (Kansas)
- Indiana
- Kansas
- Nebraska–Omaha
- Northern Colorado
- Oregon State
- Rutgers (New Jersey)
- South Carolina
- Texas A&M
- Texas Woman's
- UCLA
- Western Illinois

Texas Woman's University, newly named the Pioneers in February after years as the Tessies, won its first national championship behind the pitching of Kathy Arendsen, emerging from the losers' bracket to defeat defending champion UCLA with a pair of 1–0 wins in the final. On the final day, Arendsen pitched all 21 innings in three games. UCLA pitchers had posted shutouts in all of its games until the finals, a streak of nine games over two WCWS.

== Bracket ==
Upper round 1	Upper round 2	Upper round 3	Upper final	Final
Cal Poly–Pomona	6
Nebraska–Omaha	0
Cal Poly–Pomona	1
Western Illinois	0
Western Illinois	4
Emporia State	0
Cal Poly–Pomona	1
Texas Woman's	0
Arizona State	2
Oregon State	0
Arizona State	0
Texas Woman's	1^{(18)}
Texas Woman's	4
South Carolina	2
Cal Poly–Pomona	0
UCLA	1
Kansas	2
Arizona	0
Kansas	0
UCLA	2
UCLA	5
Texas A&M	0
UCLA	2
Northern Colorado	0
Indiana	8
Chapman College	1
Indiana	1	UCLA	0	0
Northern Colorado	4	Texas Woman's	1	1
Northern Colorado	3^{(11)}
Rutgers	2
Lower round 1	Lower round 2	Lower round 3	Lower round 4	Lower round 5	Lower final
Indiana	4
Texas Woman's	2^{(11)}
Nebraska–Omaha	4	Nebraska–Omaha	2
Indiana	2	Indiana	1
Emporia State	3
Oregon State	1	Cal Poly–Pomona	0
Kansas	0
Texas Woman's	1	Texas Woman's	2 (Note: no-hitter)
Oregon State	1^{(8)}	Oregon State	1
Northern Colorado	0
South Carolina	0
Arizona State	0
Northern Colorado	2
Arizona	2	Texas A&M	2
Texas A&M	4	Texas A&M	0
Texas A&M	6
Western Illinois	2
Western Illinois	3
Chapman College	0	Rutgers	2
Rutgers	1

== Ranking ==
Place	School	WCWS Record
1st	Texas Woman's	7-1
2nd	UCLA	4-2
3rd	Cal Poly–Pomona	3-2
4th	Northern Colorado	3-2
5th	Indiana	3-2
5th	Texas A&M	3-2
7th	Oregon State	2-2
7th	Western Illinois	2-2
9th	Arizona State	1-2
9th	Rutgers	1-2
9th	Kansas	1-2
9th	Nebraska–Omaha	1-2
13th	Chapman College	0-2
13th	Emporia State	0-2
13th	Arizona	0-2
13th	South Carolina	0-2
