= Connie Claussen =

American former softball player

- Education: Omaha Benson High School; Omaha University; Adams State College
- Occupation: Softball player

Connie Claussen is an American former softball player and professor of physical education at the University of Nebraska at Omaha.

== Biography ==
Claussen received her early education from Omaha Benson High School. She obtained a bachelor's degree from Omaha University and a master's degree from Adams State College.

Between 1963 and 1998, Claussen was a professor of physical education at the University of Nebraska at Omaha. She retired as the associate athletic director of women’s athletics at UNO on June 1, 1998.

In 1979, as a manager of the United States women's national softball team, her team won the gold medal at the Pan American Games.

University of Nebraska at Omaha softball complex is named after her. She is considered a softball pioneer.

== Recognition ==
- Charles Mancuso Award
- National Fast Pitch Coaches Association Hall of Fame
- Old Timers Baseball Hall of Fame
- UNO Athletic Hall of Fame
- Omaha Softball Association Hall of Fame
- Omaha Sports Hall of Fame
