= Benson Park =

Park in Omaha, Nebraska

Coordinates: 41°17′55″N 96°01′04″W

- Interactive map of Benson Park
- Type: Municipal (Omaha)
- Location: Benson, Nebraska
- Area: 217.3 acres (0.879 km^{2})
- Operator: City of Omaha
- Open: All year

Benson Park is located at 7028 Military Avenue in the Benson neighborhood of Omaha, Nebraska. The 217-acre (88 ha) park includes a lake and pavilion, as well as a scenic picnic area.

== History ==
When the city of Omaha annexed Benson in 1917 the suburb did not have any parks. As the community grew there was a need for a large park. In 1931, the city acquired land north of Military Avenue and it became Benson Park. A 9-hole golf course opened in the park that year, but was closed in 1947. The golf course reopened in the 1960s with an 18-hole golf course. The Omaha Tornado of 1975 lifted into the clouds at Benson Park, between the ice rink and lake. The park was renovated in 1999, deepening the lake and adding trails and sidewalks.

== Features ==
Benson Park has a lagoon used for fishing and sightseeing. The park lies in a wide valley that offers views of the surrounding hills. The ice rink is located at 69th and Military Avenue, and is open from November through March. The park also has a golf course located at 5333 North 72nd Street.

== See also ==
- Parks in Omaha, Nebraska
- Krug Park
