= Trisha Ford =

American softball coach

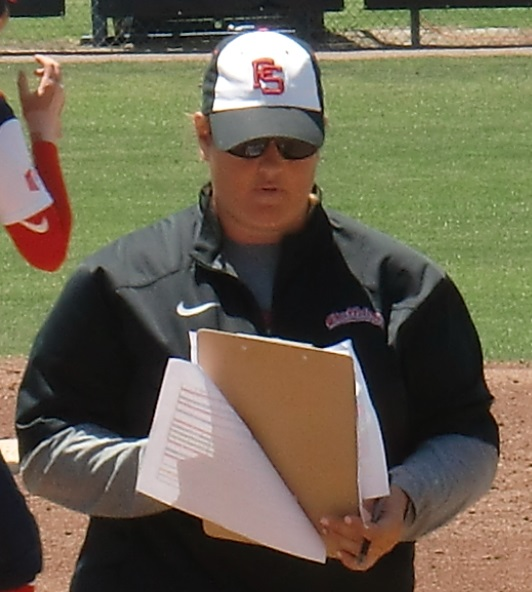
- Ford as Fresno State head coach in 2016

Current position
- Title: Head coach
- Team: Texas A&M
- Conference: SEC
- Record: 124–45 (.734)

Biographical details
- Born: October 19, 1977 (age 48); Fremont, California, U.S.

Playing career
- 1998–2000: Saint Mary's
- Position: Infielder

Coaching career (HC unless noted)
- 2001: Saint Mary's (assistant)
- 2002–2003: Saint Mary's
- 2004–2008: Stanford (pitching)
- 2009–2012: Stanford (associate HC)
- 2013–2016: Fresno State
- 2017–2022: Arizona State
- 2023-present: Texas A&M

Head coaching record
- Overall: 476–262–1 (.645)
- Tournaments: 15–14 (NCAA Division I)

Accomplishments and honors

Championships
- 2 MW regular season (2015–2016)

Awards
- MW Coach of the Year (2015); 2× Pac-12 Coach of the Year (2018, 2022)

Trisha Lynn Ford (née Dean; born October 19, 1977) is an American college softball coach. She is the head softball coach at the Texas A&M University, a position she has held since the 2023 season. Ford served as the head softball coach at Saint Mary's College of California from 2002 to 2003, California State University, Fresno from 2013 to 2016, and Arizona State University from 2017 to 2022.

== Early life and education ==
Born Trisha Lynn Dean in Fremont, California. Ford graduated from American High School in Fremont. Ford then attended Saint Mary's College of California in nearby Moraga, where she graduated in 1999 with a bachelor's degree in political science. On the Saint Mary's Gaels softball team, Ford played at infielder from 1998 to 2000 under head coach Chelle Putzer.

== Coaching career ==
=== Saint Mary's (2001–2003) ===
Ford was the hitting coach and recruiting coordinator at Saint Mary's for the 2001 season. On November 1, 2001, Ford became interim head coach, nearly a month after the resignation of Putzer. After a 17–37 season, Saint Mary's promoted Ford to the position long term on June 6, 2002. Saint Mary's improved to 25–27 in the 2003 season.

=== Stanford (2004–2012) ===
From 2004 to 2012, Ford was assistant coach at Stanford under John Rittman.

=== Fresno State (2013–2016) ===
On June 18, 2012, Ford was announced as the new head coach of the Fresno State softball program.

=== Arizona State (2017–2022) ===
On June 15, 2016, Trisha Ford was tabbed as the head coach of the Arizona State softball program. In her first season leading the Sun Devils, the 2017 team finished 31–22, 9–15 finishing sixth in Pac-12 play and went to the NCAA Tournament. In just Ford's second season at the helm of the Sun Devil Program, the team finished 48–13 and 16–8 in Pac-12 play. They finished with their best record since 2013. They finished third in the Pac-12 standings, their first conference top three finish since 2014. She led them to a Women's College World Series in 2018, where they eventually lost to Oklahoma.

=== Texas A&M (2023–present) ===
On June 7, 2022, Trisha Ford was announced as the new head coach of the Texas A&M softball program. She would make her coaching debut at Texas A&M on February 9, 2023, a 12-2 victory over Tarleton. Ford led the Aggies to a 35-21 record, an improvement over A&M's previous season, and brought the Aggies back into the NCAA Tournament but would go on to lose in the regional final to arch-rival Texas.

During the 2025 NCAA Division I softball tournament, Texas A&M earned the No. 1 overall seed for the first time in program history. During the College Station regional, the Aggies were eliminated by Liberty. This marked the first time a No. 1 seed in the NCAA tournament failed to advance to the Super Regionals since the NCAA tournament began seeding in 2005.

== Personal life ==
Trisha Ford married Eddie Ford in 2005. They have two children.

== Head coaching record ==
Record table
Season	Team	Overall	Conference	Standing	Postseason
Saint Mary's Gaels (Western Intercollegiate Softball League) (2002)
2002	Saint Mary's	17–37	0–2		
Saint Mary's Gaels (Pacific Coast Softball Conference) (2003)
2003	Saint Mary's	25–27	7–12	5th	
Saint Mary's:		42–64 (.396)	7–14 (.333)		
Fresno State Bulldogs (Mountain West Conference) (2013–2016)
2013	Fresno State	30–24	11–7	T-2nd	
2014	Fresno State	31–21	15–9	T-2nd	
2015	Fresno State	40–16	20–4	1st	NCAA Regional
2016	Fresno State	42–12–1	22–1	1st	NCAA Regional
Fresno State:		143–73–1 (.661)	68–21 (.764)		
Arizona State Sun Devils (Pac-12 Conference) (2017–2022)
2017	Arizona State	31–22	9–15	T–6th	NCAA Regional
2018	Arizona State	48–13	16–8	3rd	Women's College World Series
2019	Arizona State	35–20	13–11	4th	NCAA Regional
2020	Arizona State	22–7	0–0		Season canceled due to COVID-19
2021	Arizona State	33–16	12–9	4th	NCAA Regional
2022	Arizona State	43–11	20–4	1st	NCAA Super Regional
Arizona State:		212–89 (.704)	70–47 (.598)		
Texas A&M Aggies (Southeastern Conference) (2023–present)
2023	Texas A&M	35–21	12–12	7th	NCAA Regional
2024	Texas A&M	44–15	15–9	3rd	NCAA Super Regional
2025	Texas A&M	48–11	16–7	2nd	NCAA Regional
2026	Texas A&M	38–19	16–8	T–4th	NCAA Regional
Texas A&M:		165–66 (.714)	59–36 (.621)		
Total:		562–292–1 (.658)			
National champion Postseason invitational champion Conference regular season champion Conference regular season and conference tournament champion Division regular season champion Division regular season and conference tournament champion Conference tournament champion
