= Fresno State Bulldogs softball =

NCAA Division I softball team

- Founded: 1978
- University: California State University, Fresno
- Head coach: Charlotte Morgan (3rd season)
- Conference: Pac-12
- Location: Fresno, California, US
- Home stadium: Margie Wright Diamond (capacity: 3,288)
- Nickname: Fresno State
- Colors: Cardinal red and blue

NCAA Tournament champions
- 1998

NCAA WCWS runner-up
- 1982, 1988, 1989, 1990

NCAA WCWS appearances
- 1982, 1984, 1987, 1988, 1989, 1990, 1991, 1992, 1994, 1997, 1998, 1999

NCAA Tournament appearances
- 1982, 1983, 1984, 1985, 1986, 1987, 1988, 1989, 1990, 1991, 1992, 1993, 1994, 1995, 1996, 1997, 1998, 1999, 2000, 2001, 2002, 2003, 2004, 2005, 2006, 2007, 2008, 2009, 2010, 2011, 2015, 2016, 2017, 2021

Conference tournament championships
- WAC; 1999, 2007, 2009 MWC; 2015, 2016, 2021

Regular-season conference championships
- NorCal; 1978, 1982, 1983 Nor-Pac; 1985, 1986 Big West; 1987, 1988, 1989, 1990, 1991, 1992 WAC; 1996, 1998, 1999, 2000, 2001, 2002, 2004, 2005, 2006, 2009 MWC; 2015, 2016, 2021

The Fresno State Bulldogs softball team represents California State University, Fresno in NCAA Division I college softball. The team participates in the Mountain West Conference. Head coach Stacy May-Johnson currently leads the Bulldogs. The team's assistant coaches are Shelby Miller, Bobby Alvara, and Racquel Savoy. The team plays home games at Margie Wright Diamond, on the university's campus.

== History ==
=== Coaching history ===
Years	Coach	Record	%
1978−1985	Donna Pickel		
1986−2012	Margie Wright	1,294–450–1	.742
2013−2016	Trisha Ford	143–73–1	.661
2017−2021	Linda Garza	161-82	.663
2022−Present	Stacy May-Johnson	112-106	.514

,

== Year-by-Year Results ==
Year	Record	Win %	Mountain West Record	Win %	NCAA Tournament Record
2010	41-21	.661	0-0	0	
2011	35-19	.648	15-6	.714	1-2
2012	36-23	.610	12-6	.667	
2013	30-24	.556	11-7	.611	
2014	31-21	.596	15-9	.625	
2015	40-16	.714	20-4	.833	0-2
2016	42-12-1	.773	22-1-0	.957	1-2
2017	35-23	.603	14-9	.609	1-2
2018	31-23	.574	14-10	.583	
2019	37-20	.649	14-10	.583	
2020	21-4	.840	0-0	0	
2021	37-12	.755	20-4	.833	1-2
2022	19-36	.345	10-14	.417	
2023	23-31	.426	10-12	.455	
2024	33-19	.635	13-9	.591	
2025	37-20	.649	15-7	.682	

== Championships ==
=== NCAA Women's College World Series National Championships ===
Season	Record	Head Coach
1998	52-11	Margie Wright

=== Conference Championships ===
Season	Conference	Record	Head Coach
1978	NorCal		Donna Pickel
1982	NorCal		Donna Pickel
1983	NorCal		Donna Pickel
1985	Northern Pacific Conference		Donna Pickel
1986	Northern Pacific Conference		Margie Wright
1987	Pacific Coast Athletic Association	31-5	Margie Wright
1988	Pacific Coast Athletic Association	29-5	Margie Wright
1989	Big West Conference	29-7	Margie Wright
1990	Big West Conference	29-7	Margie Wright
1991	Big West Conference	31-5	Margie Wright
1992	Big West Conference	26-10	Margie Wright
1996	Western Athletic Conference	24-2	Margie Wright
1998	Western Athletic Conference	28-2	Margie Wright
1999	Western Athletic Conference	24-0	Margie Wright
2000	Western Athletic Conference	16-2	Margie Wright
2001	Western Athletic Conference	13-3	Margie Wright
2002	Western Athletic Conference	18-6	Margie Wright
2004	Western Athletic Conference	20-4	Margie Wright
2005	Western Athletic Conference	17-1	Margie Wright
2008	Western Athletic Conference	12-3	Margie Wright
2009	Western Athletic Conference	15-5	Margie Wright
2015	Mountain West Conference	20-4	Trisha Ford
2016	Mountain West Conference	22-1	Trisha Ford
2021	Mountain West Conference	20-4	Linda Garza

=== Conference Tournament Championships ===
Year	Conference	Tournament Location	Head Coach
1999	Western Athletic Conference	Fresno, CA	Margie Wright
2007	Western Athletic Conference	Fresno, CA	Margie Wright
2009	Western Athletic Conference	Fresno, CA	Margie Wright
2021	Mountain West Conference	Fresno, CA	Linda Garza

== Coaching staff ==
Name	Position coached	Consecutive season at Fresno State in current position
Charlotte Morgan	Head coach	1st
Shelby Miller	Assistant Coach	4th
Bobby Alvara	Assistant Coach	3rd
Racquel Savoy	Assistant Coach	1st
Keahilele Mattson	Volunteer Assistant Coach	
Sophia Medellin	Volunteer Assistant Coach	
Brayden McIntosh	Undergraduate Assistant	
