= John F. Kennedy College =

Former college in Nebraska

- Type: Private
- Active: 1965–1975
- Location: Wahoo, Nebraska, United States
- Campus: Rural
- Mascot: Patriots / Patriettes

John F. Kennedy College was an American college founded in 1965 in Wahoo, Nebraska, one of six colleges started by small-town businessmen on the model of Parsons College in Fairfield, Iowa. The college was named after President John F. Kennedy. Due to a drop in enrollment, financial difficulties and 3 fires following the end of the military conscription draft in 1973, Kennedy College closed in 1975.

== Athletics ==
JFK College was a pioneer in intercollegiate women's athletics. The softball team won the first three Women's College World Series championships in 1969–71. They were excluded from the May 1972 tournament by a decision of the Nebraska Women's Intercollegiate Sports Council in April, which barred schools from appearing in the WCWS if it gave scholarships to any women athletes, not just softball players. JFK openly awarded partial women's basketball scholarships, as that sport was governed by a non-collegiate organization, the AAU.

The women's basketball team, winners of several AAU titles in 1972 and 1973, helped to further the diplomatic thaw in Sino-American relations in 1973 by representing the U.S. on a tour of games in the People's Republic of China, which was the subject of an article in Sports Illustrated. The basketball team also advanced to the final game of the National Women's Invitational Tournament in 1972, 1973 and 1974, falling to the same team (Wayland Baptist University) each year.

== Parsons Plan ==
The "Parsons Plan" academic model was the brainchild of Millard Roberts, the president of Parsons College from 1955 to 1967. The multi-faceted plan featured innovative teaching and administrative techniques, and emphasized the recruitment of a geographically and academically diverse student body. Among other characteristics, the "Parsons Plan" schools welcomed unconventional students who had not seen success at other colleges. In the 1960s, the schools were also attended by a substantial number of young men seeking draft deferments that would allow them to avoid military service during the Vietnam War.

== Current usage ==
In 2004, a private physician bought the former library for use as an office. Since then, several buildings have been renovated. Some of the land was sold to a housing developer, and a developer built condominiums for senior citizens on part of the campus.

Three of the buildings remain empty. The building's grass is still being mowed; however, many of the buildings are suffering decay, with glass shattered, many warning signs outside, and doors that are boarded up.

== Reunions ==
The college had a 50th-anniversary reunion of the first fully graduating class in 2010. In October 2019, many coaches, students and staff of the college had a reunion.
