= Missouri State Bears and Lady Bears =

Collegiate sports club in the United States

- University: Missouri State University
- Nickname: Bears and Lady Bears; Beach Bears (beach volleyball)
- NCAA: Division I (FBS)
- Conference: CUSA (primary); American (men's soccer)
- Athletic director: Patrick Ransdell
- Location: Springfield, Missouri
- Varsity teams: 19
- Football stadium: Robert W. Plaster Stadium
- Basketball arena: Great Southern Bank Arena
- Baseball stadium: Route 66 Stadium
- Soccer stadium: Allison South Stadium
- Colors: Maroon and white
- Mascot: Boomer the Bear
- Fight song: The Scotsman
- Website: missouristatebears.com

The Missouri State Bears and Lady Bears are the athletic teams representing Missouri State University. Missouri State's athletics programs date back to 1908. Missouri State competes in the NCAA Division I Football Bowl Subdivision. The majority of sports play in the Division I Conference USA. Missouri State became a full member of CUSA on July 1, 2025.

Men's swimming and diving had competed in the Mid-American Conference through the 2023–24 season, but sponsorship of that sport transferred to the Missouri Valley Conference in July 2024. With CUSA sponsoring soccer only for women, the men's soccer team joined the American Conference.

Missouri State athletics are frequently abbreviated as "MOST".

== Sports sponsored ==
Men's sports	Women's sports
Baseball	Acrobatics & tumbling
Basketball	Basketball
Football	Beach volleyball
Golf	Cross country
Soccer	Golf
Swimming & diving	Soccer
	Softball
	Stunt
	Swimming & diving
	Tennis
	Track and field^{†}
	Volleyball
† – Track & field includes both indoor and outdoor

A member of Conference USA, Missouri State University sponsors six men's and 13 women's teams in NCAA sanctioned sports. The women's sports of acrobatics & tumbling and stunt, both included in the NCAA Emerging Sports for Women program, were added in 2024–25.

== National championships ==
=== Team ===
Assoc.	Div.	Tournament	Sport / team	Year	Runner-up	Score
NAIA	n/a	NAIA Basketball championship	Men's basketball	1952	Murray State	73–64
NAIA	n/a	NAIA Basketball championship	Men's basketball	1953	Hamline	79–71
NCAA	Division II	NCAA Golf championship	Men's golf	1963	Aquinas	1,188–1,199
AIAW	n/a	AIAW Softball championship (Note: Women's College World Series)	Softball	1974	Northern Colorado	14–7
AIAW	Division II	AIAW Field hockey championship	Field hockey	1979	Colgate	2–0

== Women's basketball NCAA tournament results ==
=== NCAA Tournament appearances ===
Year	Seed	Round	Opponent	Result
1991	#8	First Round; Second Round	#9 Tennessee Tech #1 Tennessee	W 94–64; L 47–55
1992	#8	First Round; Second Round; Sweet Sixteen; Elite Eight; Final Four	#9 Kansas #1 Iowa #5 UCLA #2 Ole Miss #4 Western Kentucky	W 75–59; W 61–60; W 83–57; W 94–71; L 72–84
1993	#7	First Round; Second Round; Sweet Sixteen	#10 Oklahoma State #2 Maryland #6 Louisiana Tech	W 86–71; W 86–82; L 43–59
1994	#6	First Round; Second Round	#11 Northern Illinois #3 Virginia	W 75–56; L 63–67
1995	#9	First Round; Second Round	#8 Utah #1 Colorado	W 49–47; L 34–78
1996	#12	First Round	#5 Texas	L 55–73
1998	#8	First Round	#9 Notre Dame	L 64–78
1999	#7	First Round; Second Round	#10 UC Santa Barbara #2 Colorado State	W 72–70; L 70–86
2000	#10	First Round	#7 Auburn	L 74–78
2001	#5	First Round; Second Round; Sweet Sixteen; Elite Eight; Final Four	#12 Toledo #4 Rutgers #1 Duke #6 Washington #3 Purdue	W 89–71; W 60–53; W 81–71; W 104–87; L 64–81
2003	#15	First Round	#2 Texas Tech	L 59–67
2004	#12	First Round	#5 Notre Dame	L 65–69 (OT)
2006	#13	First Round	#4 Purdue	L 52–73
2016	#13	First Round	#4 Texas A&M	L 65–74
2019	#11	First Round; Second Round; Sweet Sixteen	#6 DePaul #3 Iowa State #2 Stanford	W 89–77; W 69–60; L 46–55
2021	#5	First Round; Second Round; Sweet Sixteen	#12 UC Davis #13 Wright State #1 Stanford	W 70–51; W 64–39; L 62–89
2022	#11	First Four; First Round	#11 Florida State #6 Ohio State	W 61–50; L 63–56

=== WBIT appearances ===
2024, 2025

=== WNIT appearances ===
2002, 2005 (Champions), 2010, 2011, 2012, 2015, 2017, 2018, 2023

=== AIAW tournament appearances ===
Missouri AIAW state tournament: 1970–1982 (won 1971, 1973, 1974, 1975 and 1981 tournaments)
AIAW Region VI tournament: 1974, 1975, 1981
AIAW Division II national tournament: 1981

=== Conference championships ===
Gateway Conference (1983–1992) 2
1991, 1992

Missouri Valley Conference (1992–present) 12
1993, 1994, 1995, 1996, 1999, 2001, 2003, 2004, 2005, 2012, 2020, 2021

=== Head coaches ===
- Reba Sims (10 seasons, 129–116), 1969–1979
- Marti Gasser (4 seasons, 62–60), 1979–1983
- Valerie Goodwin-Colbert (4 seasons, 48–63), 1983–1987
- Cheryl Burnett (15 seasons, 319–136), 1987–2002
  - 10 NCAA Tournament Appearances
    - 2 Final Four Appearances
    - 3 Sweet 16 Appearances
  - 1 WNIT Appearance
- Katie Abrahamson-Henderson (5 seasons, 95–61), 2002–2007
  - 3 NCAA Tournament Appearances
  - WNIT Championship
- Nyla Milleson (5 seasons, 105–87), 2007–2013
  - 3 WNIT Appearances
- Kellie Harper (6 seasons, 118–79), 2013–2019
  - 2 NCAA Appearances
  - 3 WNIT Appearances
- Amaka Agugua-Hamilton (3 seasons, 73-15), 2019–2022
  - 1 NCAA Appearance
    - 1 Sweet Sixteen Appearance
- Beth Cunningham (3 seasons, 68-30) 2022–present
  - 2 WBIT appearances
  - 1 WNIT appearance

=== Retired numbers ===
- 10 Jackie Stiles, 1997–2001 (finished career as leading career scorer in NCAA Division I women's basketball with 3,393 points; now #5 on the list)
- 22 Kari Koch, 2002-2006
- 35 Melody Howard, 1990–1994
- 42 Jeanette Tendai, 1982–1986

== Facilities ==
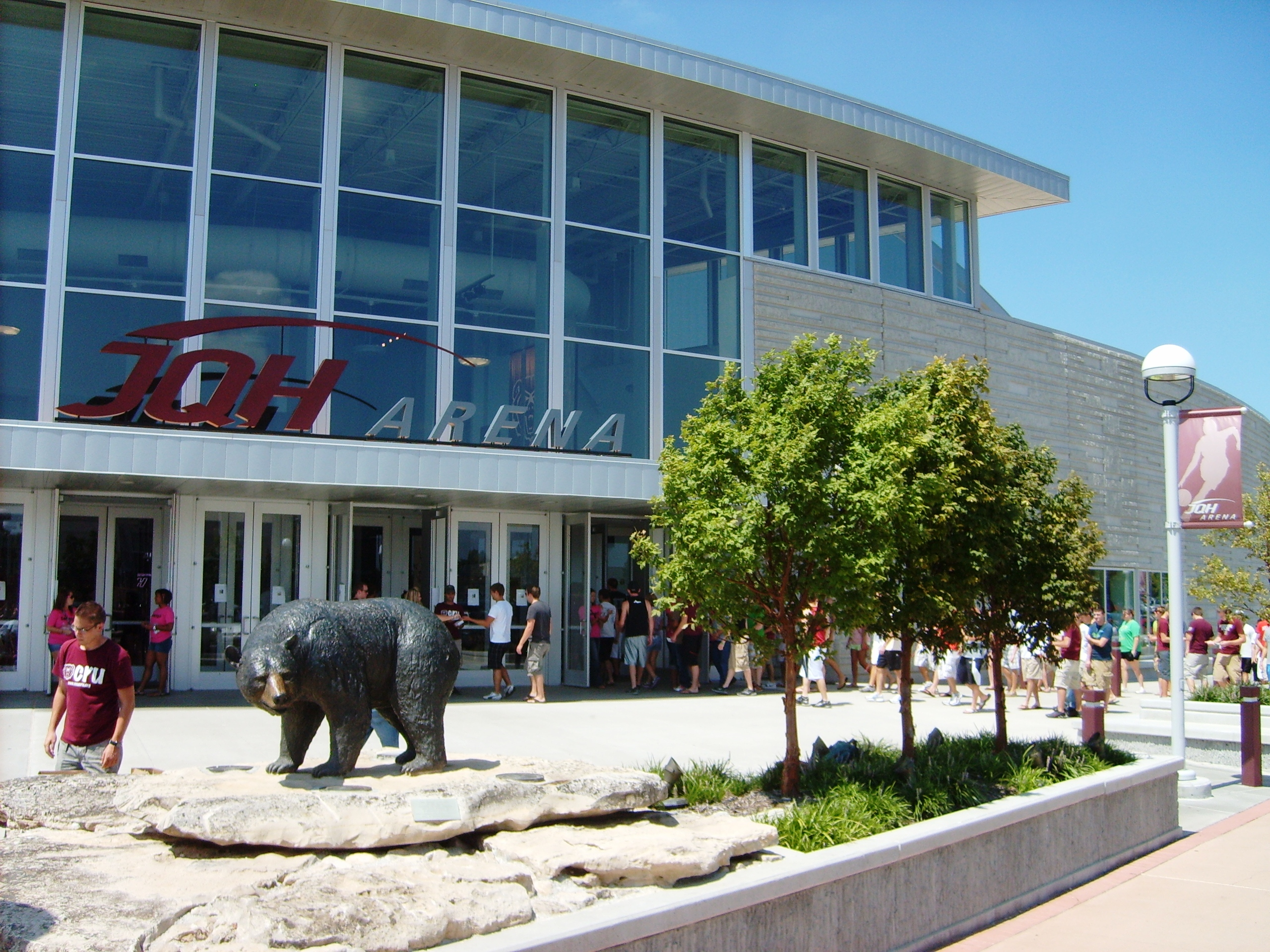
GSB Arena (exterior)

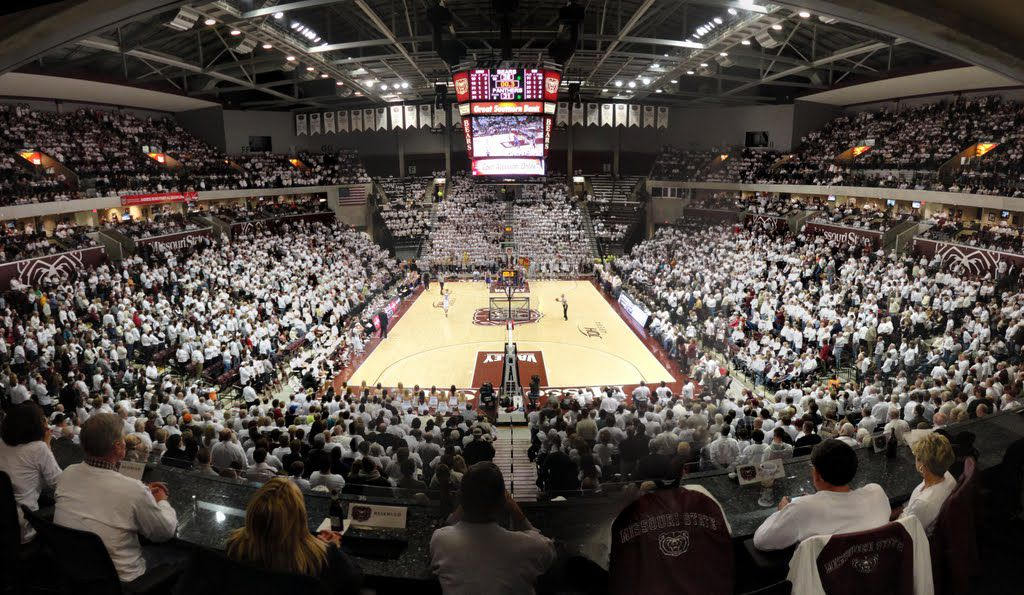
GSB Arena (interior)

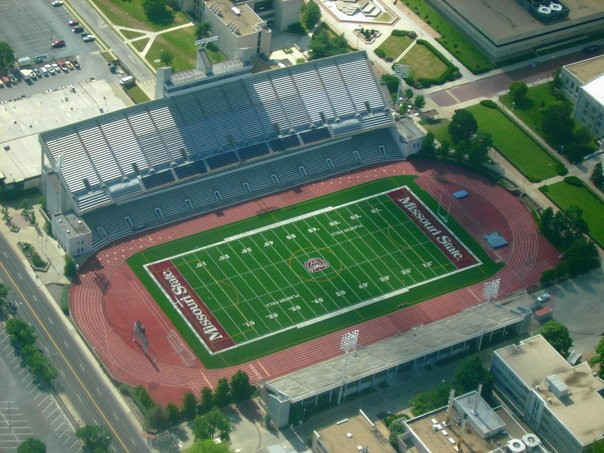
Plaster Sports Complex

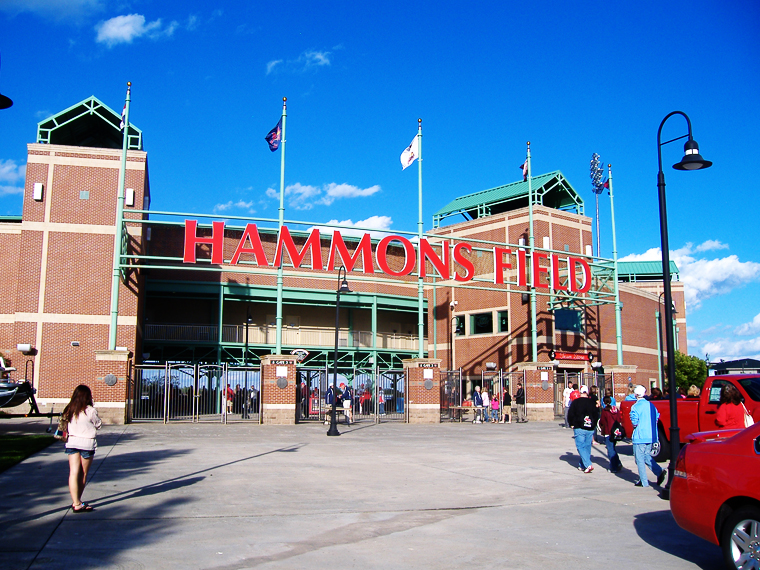
Route 66 Stadium

Facility	Opened	Sport	Capacity
Robert W. Plaster Stadium	1941	Football	17,500
Great Southern Bank Arena	2008	Basketball	11,000
Hammons Student Center	1976	Volleyball; Swimming	8,846 (Note: For swimming, capacity decreases to 300.)
Route 66 Stadium	2004	Baseball	7,986
Killian Sports Complex	2009	Softball	1,200
Betty and Bobby Allison Stadium	2014	Soccer; Track & field Field hockey Lacrosse	1,500 (Note: For field hockey and lacrosse, the capacity is 250.)
Betty and Bobby Allison Courts	2014	Beach volleyball	150
Cooper Tennis Complex	1994	Tennis	2,500
Twin Oaks Country Club + 4 Other local courses	n/a	Golf	N/A

== Club sports ==
The university also sponsors several club sports teams, including ice hockey (ACHA), lacrosse (MCLA), and roller hockey (NCRHA).

=== Men's ice hockey ===
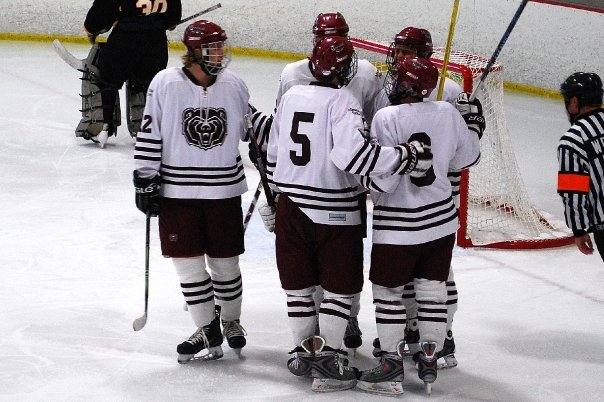
Missouri State ice hockey players celebrate a goal against University of Missouri in 2010

Missouri State men's ice hockey, known as the "Ice Bears", began in 2001 and despite not being a varsity NCAA sport receives much attention on and off-campus. The Ice Bears currently compete at the Division I level of the American Collegiate Hockey Association (ACHA) in the Western Collegiate Hockey League (WCHL). The teams play off-campus at the 2,000-seat Mediacom Ice Park.

Men's varsity ice hockey finished the 2009–2010 season ranked 2nd in the MACHA DII with a record of 12–4–0 in 16 league games, the team lost in the MACHA Championship 1–5 to Southern Illinois University- Edwardsville. In addition to the ACHA DII team the University also fields a JV teams playing at the ACHA DIII level. The team won the MACHA DIII championship with a 5–3 win over Robert Morris University- Peoria.

=== Men's lacrosse ===
Missouri State also fields a highly successful club Lacrosse Team. Founded in 2003, it competes in the Men's Collegiate Lacrosse Association (MCLA) Division II and was a member of the Great Rivers Lacrosse Conference (GRLC) through 2017 before it moved to Division II of the Lone Star Alliance (LSA) in 2018. The Bears have been conference champions five times in their history (2004, 2009, 2010, 2017, and 2018) and have qualified for the MCLA National Championships on four occasions (2009, 2010, 2017, and 2018). The Bears finished the 2018 season with a record of 12–3, including a perfect 6–0 conference record and victories over Creighton, Baylor, and in-state rival University of Missouri. Since 2003, Missouri State has fielded 11 All-Americans, over 80 All-Conference players, 3 GRLC Tournament MVP's, and 4 GRLC Division II Coach's of the Year.

Head coach	Year	Record
Daren Turner	2002–2008	24–21
Austin Holman	2009–2010	23–9
Pat Callaham	2011–2012	12-13
Dustin Rich	2013–2018	32-30
Donnie Curran	2019–present	0-0
