= 1997 Arizona Wildcats softball team =

American college softball season

1997 Arizona Wildcats softball

National Champion NCAA Tucson Regional champion Pac-10 champion
- Conference: Pacific-10 Conference
- Record: 61–5 (26–1 Pac-10)
- Head coach: Mike Candrea (12th season)
- Home stadium: Rita Hillenbrand Memorial Stadium

1997 Pacific-10 Conference softball standings
	Conf.						Overall
Team	W		L		T	PCT	W		L		T	PCT
No. 1 Arizona ‍†‍‍^{y}	26	–	1	–	0	.963	61	–	5	–	0	.924
No. 2 UCLA ‍‍‍^{y}	21	–	7	–	0	.750	49	–	14	–	0	.778
No. 4 Washington ‍‍‍^{y}	16	–	11	–	0	.593	50	–	19	–	0	.725
No. 11 California ‍‍‍^{y}	13	–	14	–	0	.481	36	–	26	–	0	.581
Stanford ‍‍‍	10	–	18	–	0	.357	31	–	27	–	0	.534
No. 23 Arizona State ‍‍‍^{y}	9	–	19	–	0	.321	32	–	25	–	0	.561
Oregon ‍‍‍	9	–	19	–	0	.321	24	–	35	–	0	.407
Oregon State ‍‍‍	6	–	21	–	0	.222	29	–	34	–	1	.461
† – Conference champion y – Invited to the NCAA tournament As of May 31, 1997; Rankings from NFCA/USA Today

The 1997 Arizona Wildcats softball team represented the University of Arizona in the 1997 NCAA Division I softball season. The Wildcats were coached by Mike Candrea, who led his twelfth season. The Wildcats finished with a record of 61–5. They played their home games at Rita Hillenbrand Memorial Stadium and competed in the Pacific-10 Conference, where they finished first with a 26–1 record.

The Wildcats were invited to the 1997 NCAA Division I softball tournament, where they swept the West Regional and then completed a run through the Women's College World Series to claim their fifth NCAA Women's College World Series Championship.

== Roster ==
1997 Arizona Wildcats roster
Pitchers: 3 – Carrie Dolan – senior; 13 – Nancy Evans – junior; Catchers: 7 – Lety Pineda – junior; 12 – Lindsay Mullins – freshman; 31 – Leah Braatz – junior	Infielders: 5 – Katie Swan – freshman; 6 – Alison Johnsen – junior; 11 – Lisa Pitt – sophomore; 18 – Tiana Hejduk – junior; 20 – Leah O'Brien – senior; 21 – Michelle Churnock – sophomore	Outfielders: 10 – Julie Reitan – junior; 22 – Andrea Doty – senior; 26 – Brandi Shriver – senior; 99 – Chrissy Gil – freshman

== Schedule ==
Legend
	Arizona win
	Arizona loss
*	Non-Conference game

1997 Arizona Wildcats softball game log
Regular season

February
Date	Opponent	Rank	Site/stadium	Score	Overall record	Pac-10 record
Feb 7	Northwestern State*	No. 1	Rita Hillenbrand Memorial Stadium • Tucson, AZ	W 10–2	1–0	
Feb 7	Northwestern State*	No. 1	Rita Hillenbrand Memorial Stadium • Tucson, AZ	18–2^{5}	W 2–0	
Feb 8	UIC*	No. 1	Rita Hillenbrand Memorial Stadium • Tucson, AZ	W 8–2	3–0	
Feb 8	UIC*	No. 1	Rita Hillenbrand Memorial Stadium • Tucson, AZ	W 11–1	4–0	
Feb 9	No. 4 Washington*	No. 1	Rita Hillenbrand Memorial Stadium • Tucson, AZ	W 7–3	5–0	
Feb 14	vs Texas*	No. 1	Tempe, AZ	W 6–2	6–0	
Feb 14	vs No. 19 Nebraska*	No. 1	Tempe, AZ	W 15– ^{5}	7–0	
Feb 15	vs No. 13 UNLV*	No. 1	Tempe, AZ	W 5–2	8–0	
Feb 15	vs UC Santa Barbara*	No. 1	Tempe, AZ	W 10–0^{5}	9–0	
Feb 16	vs Utah State*	No. 1	Tempe, AZ	W 8–0^{5}	10–0	
Feb 22	vs Alabama*	No. 1	Lamson Park • Lafayette, LA	W 9–0^{5}	11–0	
Feb 22	at No. 7 Southwestern Louisiana*	No. 1	Lamson Park • Lafayette, LA	W 4–1	12–0	
Feb 22	vs Baylor*	No. 1	Lamson Park • Lafayette, LA	W 6–2	13–0	
Feb 23	vs Alabama*	No. 1	Lamson Park • Lafayette, LA	W 13–0	14–0	
Feb 23	vs Baylor*	No. 1	Lamson Park • Lafayette, LA	W 10–0^{5}	15–0	

March
Date	Opponent	Rank	Site/stadium	Score	Overall record	Pac-10 record
Mar 1	Kent State*	No. 1	Rita Hillenbrand Memorial Stadium • Tucson, AZ	W 4–0	16–0	
Mar 1	DePaul*	No. 1	Rita Hillenbrand Memorial Stadium • Tucson, AZ	W 8–0	17–0	
Mar 1	LSU*	No. 1	Rita Hillenbrand Memorial Stadium • Tucson, AZ	W 8–4	18–0	
Mar 2	Kansas*	No. 1	Rita Hillenbrand Memorial Stadium • Tucson, AZ	W 11–1	19–0	
Mar 2	Colorado State*	No. 1	Rita Hillenbrand Memorial Stadium • Tucson, AZ	W 9–0	20–0	
Mar 2	Florida*	No. 1	Rita Hillenbrand Memorial Stadium • Tucson, AZ	W 10–0	21–0	
Mar 8	No. 12 California	No. 1	Rita Hillenbrand Memorial Stadium • Tucson, AZ	W 4–3	22–0	1–0
Mar 8	No. 12 California	No. 1	Rita Hillenbrand Memorial Stadium • Tucson, AZ	W 4–1	23–0	2–0
Mar 9	Stanford	No. 1	Rita Hillenbrand Memorial Stadium • Tucson, AZ	W 8–2	24–0	3–0
Mar 9	Stanford	No. 1	Rita Hillenbrand Memorial Stadium • Tucson, AZ	W 6–0	25–0	4–0
Mar 20	vs Ohio State*	No. 1	Titan Softball Complex • Fullerton, CA	W 15–6	26–0	
Mar 20	vs No. 12 Oklahoma State*	No. 1	Titan Softball Complex • Fullerton, CA	W 12–0^{5}	27–0	
Mar 21	vs No. 23 Hawaii*	No. 1	Titan Softball Complex • Fullerton, CA	W 6–5	28–0	
Mar 21	vs UNLV*	No. 1	Titan Softball Complex • Fullerton, CA	W 17–0^{5}	29–0	
Mar 22	No. 24 Cal State Northridge*	No. 1	Rita Hillenbrand Memorial Stadium • Tucson, AZ	W 1–0^{5}	30–0	
Mar 22	Oregon State*	No. 1	Rita Hillenbrand Memorial Stadium • Tucson, AZ	L 0–3	30–1	
Mar 29	at No. 3 UCLA	No. 1	Easton Stadium • Los Angeles, CA	W 4–1	31–1	5–0
Mar 29	at No. 3 UCLA	No. 1	Easton Stadium • Los Angeles, CA	L 1–5	31–2	5–1

April
Date	Opponent	Rank	Site/stadium	Score	Overall record	Pac-10 record
Apr 4	No. 5 Washington	No. 1	Rita Hillenbrand Memorial Stadium • Tucson, AZ	W 3–2	32–2	6–1
Apr 4	No. 5 Washington	No. 1	Rita Hillenbrand Memorial Stadium • Tucson, AZ	W 8–2	33–2	7–1
Apr 6	at No. 2 Fresno State*	No. 1	Bulldog Diamond • Fresno, CA	L 2–5	33–3	
Apr 6	at No. 2 Fresno State*	No. 1	Bulldog Diamond • Fresno, CA	L 5–6	33–4	
Apr 9	at No. 10 Arizona State	No. 2	Tempe, AZ	W 5–1	34–4	8–1
Apr 9	at No. 10 Arizona State	No. 2	Tempe, AZ	W 10–1	35–4	9–1
Apr 12	at Oregon	No. 2	Howe Field • Eugene, OR	W 5–0	36–4	10–1
Apr 12	at Oregon	No. 2	Howe Field • Eugene, OR	W 12–1	37–4	11–1
Apr 13	at Oregon State	No. 2	Corvallis, OR	W 6–2^{6}	38–4	12–1
Apr 18	No. 4 UCLA	No. 2	Rita Hillenbrand Memorial Stadium • Tucson, AZ	W 11–0	39–4	13–1
Apr 18	No. 4 UCLA	No. 2	Rita Hillenbrand Memorial Stadium • Tucson, AZ	W 10–6	40–4	14–1
Apr 19	No. 23 Cal State Northridge*	No. 2	Rita Hillenbrand Memorial Stadium • Tucson, AZ	W 4–3	41–4	
Apr 19	No. 23 Cal State Northridge*	No. 2	Rita Hillenbrand Memorial Stadium • Tucson, AZ	W 16–6^{5}	42–4	
Apr 23	No. 12 Arizona State	No. 1	Rita Hillenbrand Memorial Stadium • Tucson, AZ	W 8–4	43–4	15–1
Apr 23	No. 12 Arizona State	No. 1	Rita Hillenbrand Memorial Stadium • Tucson, AZ	W 11–2	44–4	16–1
Apr 26	at No. 24 California	No. 1	Levine-Fricke Field • Berkeley, CA	W 10–4	45–4	17–1
Apr 26	at No. 24 California	No. 1	Levine-Fricke Field • Berkeley, CA	W 11–0	46–4	18–1
Apr 27	at Stanford	No. 1	Boyd & Jill Smith Family Stadium • Stanford, CA	W 5–1	47–4	19–1
Apr 27	at Stanford	No. 1	Boyd & Jill Smith Family Stadium • Stanford, CA	W 3–0	48–4	20–1

May
Date	Opponent	Rank	Site/stadium	Score	Overall record	Pac-10 record
May 2	Oregon	No. 1	Rita Hillenbrand Memorial Stadium • Tucson, AZ	W 5–3	49–4	21–1
May 2	Oregon	No. 1	Rita Hillenbrand Memorial Stadium • Tucson, AZ	W 9–1	50–4	22–1
May 3	Oregon State	No. 1	Rita Hillenbrand Memorial Stadium • Tucson, AZ	W 11–1^{5}	51–4	23–1
May 3	Oregon State	No. 1	Rita Hillenbrand Memorial Stadium • Tucson, AZ	W 11–1^{5}	52–4	24–1
May 10	at No. 6 Washington	No. 1	Husky Softball Stadium • Seattle, WA	W 9–1	53–4	25–1
May 10	at No. 6 Washington	No. 1	Husky Softball Stadium • Seattle, WA	W 4–3	54–4	26–1

Postseason

NCAA Tucson Regional
Date	Opponent	Rank	Site/stadium	Score	Overall record	NCAAT record
May 16	Rider	No. 1	Rita Hillenbrand Memorial Stadium • Tucson, AZ	W 11–2	55–4	1–0
May 17	Nebraska	No. 1	Rita Hillenbrand Memorial Stadium • Tucson, AZ	W 2–0	56–4	2–0
May 18	Nebraska	No. 1	Rita Hillenbrand Memorial Stadium • Tucson, AZ	W 5–1	57–4	3–0

NCAA Women's College World Series
Date	Opponent	Rank (Seed)	Site/stadium	Score	Overall record	WCWS Record
May 22	(8) UMass	No. 1 (1)	ASA Hall of Fame Stadium • Oklahoma City, OK	W 2–1^{8}	58–4	1–0
May 23	(5) UCLA	No. 1 (1)	ASA Hall of Fame Stadium • Oklahoma City, OK	W 2–0^{14}	59–4	2–0
May 25	(4) Fresno State	No. 1 (1)	ASA Hall of Fame Stadium • Oklahoma City, OK	L 0–3	59–5	2–1
May 25	(4) Fresno State	No. 1 (1)	ASA Hall of Fame Stadium • Oklahoma City, OK	W 6–2	60–5	3–1
May 26	(5) UCLA	No. 1 (1)	ASA Hall of Fame Stadium • Oklahoma City, OK	W 10–2^{5}	61–5	4–1

== Ranking movements ==
Ranking movements Legend: ██ Increase in ranking ██ Decrease in ranking
	Week												
Poll	Pre	1	2	3	4	5	6	7	8	9	10	11	Final
NFCA/USA Today	1	1	1	1	1	1	1	2	2	1	1	1	1
