= 1997 NCAA Division I softball season =

American college softball season

- Defending Champions: Arizona

Tournament

Women's College World Series
- Champions: Arizona (5th title)
- Runners-up: UCLA (15th WCWS Appearance)
- Winning Coach: Mike Candrea (5th title)
- WCWS MOP: Nancy Evans (Arizona)

Seasons
- ← 1996 1998 →

The 1997 NCAA Division I softball season, a play of college softball in the United States organized by the National Collegiate Athletic Association (NCAA) at the Division I level, began in February 1997. The season progressed through the regular season, many conference tournaments and championship series, and concluded with the 1997 NCAA Division I softball tournament and 1997 Women's College World Series. The Women's College World Series, consisting of the eight remaining teams in the NCAA Tournament and held in held in Oklahoma City at ASA Hall of Fame Stadium, ended on May 26, 1997.

== Conference standings ==
1997 Big 12 Conference softball standings
	Conf.						Overall
Team	W		L		T	PCT	W		L		T	PCT
No. 12 Missouri ‍†‍‡‍^{y}	15	–	3	–	0	.833	47	–	16	–	0	.746
No. 18 Oklahoma ‍‍‍^{y}	14	–	4	–	0	.778	55	–	19	–	0	.743
No. 17 Kansas ‍‍‍^{y}	11	–	6	–	0	.647	38	–	23	–	0	.623
No. 25 Nebraska ‍‍‍^{y}	10	–	6	–	0	.625	28	–	22	–	0	.560
No. 10 Oklahoma State ‍‍‍^{y}	10	–	7	–	0	.588	40	–	22	–	0	.645
Texas A&M ‍‍‍	7	–	9	–	0	.438	37	–	29	–	0	.561
Texas ‍‍‍	6	–	10	–	0	.375	30	–	24	–	0	.556
Baylor ‍‍‍	4	–	8	–	0	.333	38	–	22	–	0	.633
Texas Tech ‍‍‍	1	–	13	–	0	.071	34	–	29	–	1	.539
Iowa State ‍‍‍	1	–	13	–	0	.071	17	–	24	–	0	.415
† – Conference champion ‡ – Tournament champion y – Invited to the NCAA tournament Rankings from NFCA/USA Today

1997 Big Ten Conference softball standings
	Conf.						Overall
Team	W		L		T	PCT	W		L		T	PCT
No. 5 Iowa ‍†‍‍^{y}	22	–	0	–	0	1.000	52	–	9	–	0	.852
No. 6 Michigan ‍‍‡‍^{y}	18	–	4	–	0	.818	51	–	14	–	0	.785
No. 24 Michigan State ‍‍‍^{y}	14	–	9	–	0	.609	47	–	22	–	0	.681
Purdue ‍‍‍	14	–	10	–	0	.583	41	–	25	–	0	.621
Indiana ‍‍‍	11	–	11	–	0	.500	27	–	21	–	0	.563
Minnesota ‍‍‍	10	–	13	–	0	.435	37	–	19	–	0	.661
Wisconsin ‍‍‍	10	–	13	–	0	.435	32	–	25	–	0	.561
Northwestern ‍‍‍	9	–	14	–	0	.391	19	–	31	–	0	.380
Ohio State ‍‍‍	4	–	18	–	0	.182	20	–	31	–	0	.392
Penn State ‍‍‍	2	–	22	–	0	.083	23	–	32	–	0	.418
† – Conference champion ‡ – Tournament champion y – Invited to the NCAA tournament As of June 1997; Rankings from NFCA/USA Today

1997 Pacific-10 Conference softball standings
	Conf.						Overall
Team	W		L		T	PCT	W		L		T	PCT
No. 1 Arizona ‍†‍‍^{y}	26	–	1	–	0	.963	61	–	5	–	0	.924
No. 2 UCLA ‍‍‍^{y}	21	–	7	–	0	.750	49	–	14	–	0	.778
No. 4 Washington ‍‍‍^{y}	16	–	11	–	0	.593	50	–	19	–	0	.725
No. 11 California ‍‍‍^{y}	13	–	14	–	0	.481	36	–	26	–	0	.581
Stanford ‍‍‍	10	–	18	–	0	.357	31	–	27	–	0	.534
No. 23 Arizona State ‍‍‍^{y}	9	–	19	–	0	.321	32	–	25	–	0	.561
Oregon ‍‍‍	9	–	19	–	0	.321	24	–	35	–	0	.407
Oregon State ‍‍‍	6	–	21	–	0	.222	29	–	34	–	1	.461
† – Conference champion y – Invited to the NCAA tournament As of May 31, 1997; Rankings from NFCA/USA Today

1997 Southland Conference softball standings
	Conf.						Overall
Team	W		L		T	PCT	W		L		T	PCT
Northeast Louisiana ‍†‍‍	20	–	3	–	0	.870	47	–	12	–	1	.792
Nicholls State ‍‍‍^{y}	16	–	7	–	0	.696	48	–	23	–	0	.676
McNeese State ‍‍‍	13	–	10	–	0	.565	32	–	27	–	0	.542
Northwestern Louisiana ‍‍‍	12	–	10	–	0	.545	26	–	29	–	0	.473
Texas–Arlington ‍‍‍	10	–	11	–	0	.476	18	–	30	–	0	.375
Texas–San Antonio ‍‍‍	11	–	13	–	0	.458	21	–	30	–	0	.412
Sam Houston State ‍‍‍	9	–	15	–	0	.375	14	–	32	–	0	.304
Southwest Texas State ‍‍‍	8	–	15	–	0	.348	12	–	37	–	0	.245
Stephen F. Austin ‍‍‍	4	–	17	–	0	.190	14	–	36	–	0	.280
† – Conference champion y – Invited to the NCAA tournament As of May 20, 1997; Rankings from NFCA/USA Today

== Women's College World Series ==
The 1997 NCAA Women's College World Series took place from May 22 to May 26, 1997 in Oklahoma City.

First round
1	Arizona	2^{8}
8	UMass	1
4	Fresno State	0
5	UCLA	2^{8}
8	UMass	1
4	Fresno State	2
3	Iowa	3
6	Michigan	2
7	Washington	6
2	South Carolina	0
6	Michigan	1
2	South Carolina	0

Second round
1	Arizona	2^{14}
5	UCLA	0
4	Fresno State	7
3	Iowa	6
3	Iowa	1
7	Washington	5
6	Michigan	3
5	UCLA	7

Semifinals
1	Arizona	0	6
4	Fresno State	3	3
7	Washington	3	0
5	UCLA	4	1

Finals
1	Arizona	10^{5}
5	UCLA	2

== Season leaders ==
Batting

- Batting average: .539 – Kim Durce, Alcorn State Braves
- RBIs: 78 – Leah Braatz, Arizona Wildcats
- Home runs: 21 – Leah Braatz, Arizona Wildcats

Pitching

- Wins: 45-10 – Sarah Dawson, Louisiana–Monroe Warhawks
- ERA: 0.37 (13 ER/242.2 IP) – Trinity Johnson, South Carolina Gamecocks
- Strikeouts: 399 – Trinity Johnson, South Carolina Gamecocks

== Records ==
NCAA Division I season hits: 132 – Alison McCutcheon, Arizona Wildcats

Freshman single game stolen bases: 6 – Kathy Ching, Yale Bulldogs; April 6, 1997

Sophomore single game stolen bases: 7 – Lisa Guillory, Nicholls State Colonels; February 20, 1997

Freshman class stolen bases: 64 – Kathy Ching, Yale Bulldogs

Senior class doubles: 27 – Sara Pickering, Washington Huskies

Senior class shutouts: 31 – Sarah Dawson, Louisiana–Monroe Warhawks

Senior class innings pitched: 400.2 – Sarah Dawson, Louisiana–Monroe Warhawks

Team batting average: .439 – Alcorn State Braves

== Awards ==
- Honda Sports Award Softball:

Trinity Johnson, South Carolina Gamecocks

YEAR	W	L	GP	GS	CG	SHO	SV	IP	H	R	ER	BB	SO	ERA	WHIP
1997	34	4	43	33	32	24	4	242.1	82	25	13	23	399	0.37	0.43

== All America Teams ==
The following players were members of the All-American Teams.

First Team

Position	Player	Class	School
P	Sarah Dawson	SR.	ULM Warhawks
P	Nancy Evans	JR.	Arizona Wildcats
P	Trinity Johnson	SR.	South Carolina Gamecocks
C	Leah Braatz	JR.	Arizona Wildcats
1B	Leah O'Brien	JR.	Arizona Wildcats
2B	Sara Pickering	SR.	Washington Huskies
3B	Leticia Pineda	JR.	Arizona Wildcats
SS	Laura Williams	SR.	Georgia Tech Yellowjackets
OF	Alison McCutcheon	SR.	Arizona Wildcats
OF	Laura Berg	JR.	Fresno State Bulldogs
OF	Sandy Rhea	JR.	Utah Utes
DP	Lisa Dacquisto	SR.	Arizona State Sun Devils
UT	Debbie Bilbao	JR.	Iowa Hawkeyes
AT-L	Traci Conrad	SO.	Michigan Wolverines
AT-L	Sarah Fredstrom	JR.	Colorado State Rams
AT-L	Stacey Nuveman	FR.	UCLA Bruins
AT-L	Amanda Scott	FR.	Fresno State Bulldogs
AT-L	Barb Wright	SR.	Missouri Tigers

Second Team

Position	Player	Class	School
P	B'Ann Burns	SR.	UCLA Bruins
P	Nikki Johnson	SR.	Colorado State Rams
P	Desarie Knipfer	JR.	Cal Poly Mustangs
C	Jennifer Parker	SR.	CSUN Matadors
1B	Alleah Poulson	SR.	UCLA Bruins
2B	Jennifer Buford	JR.	Colorado State Rams
3B	Monica Armendarez	JR.	Indiana Hoosiers
SS	Jennifer Lizama	FR.	Nebraska Cornhuskers
OF	Shelley Brown	SR.	Washington Huskies
OF	Robyn Yorke	JR.	Fresno State Bulldogs
OF	Lea Twigg	SR.	Iowa Hawkeyes
DP	Dana Degen	FR.	Hawaii Rainbow Wahine
UT	Tina Plew	SR.	South Carolina Gamecocks
AT-L	Kelly Holmes	SR.	Michigan Wolverines
AT-L	Kari Knopf	SR.	Iowa Hawkeyes
AT-L	Nina Lindenberg	JR.	Fresno State Bulldogs
AT-L	Jill Most	SR.	Oklahoma Sooners
AT-L	Becky Newbry	SO.	Washington Huskies

Third Team

Position	Player	Class	School
P	Susie Bugliarello	SR.	Sacramento State Hornets
P	Jamie Schuttek	SR.	Southern Illinois Salukis
P	Christa Williams	FR.	UCLA Bruins
C	Brandi Macias	SR.	Iowa Hawkeyes
1B	Jamie Foutch	SO.	Oklahoma State Cowgirls
2B	Tammy Pytel	JR.	Northern Illinois Huskies
3B	Stephanie Bonillas	JR.	New Mexico State Aggies
SS	Christie Ambrosi	SO.	UCLA Bruins
OF	Myssi Calkins	SR.	FSU Seminoles
OF	Erin Hickey	SR.	DePaul Blue Demons
OF	Priscilla Welch	SR.	Illinois State Redbirds
DP	Tiffany Clark	FR.	ULL Rajin' Cajuns
UT	Tarrah Beyster	FR.	Oregon State Beavers
AT-L	Stephanie DeFeo	SR.	ULL Rajin' Cajuns
AT-L	Kristy Fuentes	SR.	FSU Seminoles
AT-L	Christy Hebert	SR.	Iowa Hawkeyes
AT-L	Danielle Henderson	SO.	UMass Minutewomen
AT-L	Kim Rondina	SR.	UNLV Rebels
