= 1997 NCAA Division I softball rankings =

1997 NCAA Division I softball season
- Defending Champions: Arizona

Tournament

Women's College World Series
- Champions: Arizona (5th title)
- Runners-up: UCLA (15th WCWS Appearance)
- Winning Coach: Mike Candrea (5th title)
- WCWS MOP: Nancy Evans (Arizona)

Seasons
- ← 1996 1998 →

The following human polls make up the 1997 NCAA Division I women's softball rankings. The NFCA/USA Today Poll is voted on by a panel of 32 Division I softball coaches and ranks to top 25 teams nationally.

== Legend ==
	Increase in ranking
	Decrease in ranking
	Not ranked previous week
Italics	Number of first place votes
(#–#)	Win–loss record
т	Tied with team above or below also with this symbol

== NFCA/USA Today ==
	Week 0 Jan 25	Week 1 Feb 26	Week 2 Mar 5	Week 3 Mar 12	Week 4 Mar 19	Week 5 Mar 26	Week 6 Apr 2	Week 7 Apr 9	Week 8 Apr 16	Week 9 Apr 23	Week 10 Apr 30	Week 11 May 7	Week Final May 28	
1.	Arizona	Arizona (25) (15–0)	Arizona (25) (21–0)	Arizona (25) (25–0)	Arizona (25) (25–0)	Arizona (25) (30–1)	Arizona (25) (31–2)	Fresno State (15) (37–6)	Fresno State (17) (39–6)	Arizona (16) (42–4)	Arizona (21) (48–4)	Arizona (24) (42–4)	Arizona (25) (61–5)	1.
2.	UCLA	Fresno State (9–0)	Fresno State (10–1)	Fresno State (16–1)	Fresno State (19–2)	Fresno State (27–4)	Fresno State (34–5)	Arizona (9) (33–4)	Arizona (8) (38–4)	Fresno State (8) (42–7)	Fresno State (3) (44–7)	South Carolina (1) (52–4)	UCLA (49–14)	2.
3.	Fresno State	UCLA (13–4)	UCLA (20–4)	UCLA (22–4)	UCLA (22–4)	UCLA (24–4)	UCLA (28–6)	UCLA (29–7)	South Carolina (45–3)	South Carolina (1) (51–3)	South Carolina (1) (57–3)	Iowa (46–5)	Fresno State (54–14)	3.
4.	Washington	Washington (12–3)	South Carolina (11–2)	South Carolina (19–2)	South Carolina (24–2)	South Carolina (30–2)	South Carolina (36–2)	South Carolina (1) (41–3)	UCLA (32–8)	UCLA (34–10)	UCLA (38–10)	Fresno State (45–10)	Washington (50–19)	4.
5.	Michigan	Michigan (4–2–1)	Washington (16–5)	Washington (16–5)	Washington (16–5)	Washington (20–6)	Washington (24–6)	Iowa (29–5)	Iowa (31–5)	Iowa (36–5)	Iowa (41–5)	UCLA (39–11)	Iowa (52–9)	5.
6.	Iowa	South Carolina (5–2)	Long Beach State (17–5)	Michigan (18–5–1)	Iowa (13–3)	Iowa (19–3)	Iowa (25–5)	Washington (25–9)	Washington (28–10)	Washington (31–10)	Washington (38–10)	Washington (43–13)	Michigan (56–16–1)	6.
7.	Southwestern Louisiana	Long Beach State (13–5)	Michigan (9–3–1)	Iowa (10–3)	Cal Poly (26–4)	Oklahoma (35–11)	Oklahoma (35–11)	Oklahoma (40–11)	Oklahoma (43–12)	Missouri (41–11)	Oklahoma (51–15)	Missouri (47–14)	South Carolina (63–5)	7.
8.	California	Oklahoma State (9–2)	Arizona State (11–3)	Cal Poly (22–3)	Michigan State (25–5)	Cal Poly (26–4)	Michigan (28–8–1)	Cal Poly (31–8)	Michigan State (40–9)	Oklahoma (46–14)	Michigan (45–13–1)	Michigan (48–13–1)	UMass (37–23–1)	8.
9.	South Carolina	Iowa (5–1)	Iowa (5–1)	Minnesota (19–5)	Michigan (21–7–1)	Michigan (25–8–1)	Cal Poly (30–6)	Michigan (30–10–1)	Missouri (36–10)	Michigan State (43–11)	Missouri (43–13)	Oklahoma (54–17)	Colorado State (51–14)	9.
10.	Oklahoma	California (9–6)	Minnesota (19–5)	Long Beach State (18–8)	Minnesota (19–5)	Long Beach State (23–9)	Michigan State (33–8)	Arizona State (28–8)	Cal Poly (32–11)	Michigan (40–13–1)	Colorado State (41–10)	Colorado State (47–12)	Oklahoma State (40–22)	10.
11.	Oklahoma State	Minnesota (14–2)	South Florida (14–2)	Oklahoma State (17–7)	Long Beach State (20–8)	Minnesota (19–5)	Arizona State (27–7)	Missouri (34–8)	Arizona State (30–12)	Cal Poly (34–13)	Michigan State (43–16)	Long Beach State (42–17–1)	California (35–25)	11.
12.	Cal State Fullerton	South Florida (8–0)	California (10–7)	Arizona State (13–5)	Oklahoma State (21–7)	Michigan State (28–8)	Missouri (30–8)	Michigan State (36–9)	Michigan (34–12–1)	Arizona State (30–14)	Long Beach State (38–17–1)	South Florida (45–11)	Missouri (47–16)	12.
13.	UNLV	Southwestern Louisiana (5–3)	Cal Poly (18–2)	Oklahoma (20–8)	Arizona State (19–7)	Arizona State (22–7)	Long Beach State (25–12–1)	Long Beach State (38–13–1)	Long Beach State (32–15–1)	Long Beach State (35–16–1)	South Florida (43–11)	Michigan State (44–18)	Southwestern Louisiana (46–18)	13.
14.	Long Beach State	Cal State Northridge (7–2–2)	Oklahoma State (12–6)	South Florida (19–5)	Oklahoma (28–9)	Missouri (25–7)	Minnesota (21–9)	South Florida (34–9)	Minnesota (30–9) т	South Florida (43–11)	Arizona State (30–18)	Utah (39–16)	South Florida (50–13)	14.
15.	Cal State Northridge	Arizona State (8–2)	Oklahoma (15–8)	Missouri (13–2)	Missouri (19–6)	South Florida (28–9)	South Florida (30–9)	Minnesota (25–9)	South Florida (35–10) т	Colorado State (39–10)	Cal Poly (34–15)	Florida State (45–17–1)	Long Beach State (44–20–1)	15.
16.	South Florida	Florida State (10–4)	Missouri (11–2)	Michigan State (18–4)	South Florida (25–8)	Oklahoma State (22–11)	Colorado State (31–8)	Colorado State (34–9)	Colorado State (36–9)	Minnesota (31–12)	Utah (36–13)	Cal Poly (36–17)	Utah (44–18)	16.
17.	Florida State	Oklahoma (11–6)	Florida State (13–6)	California (11–10)	California (17–12)	Colorado State (27–8)	Oklahoma State (24–11)	Northeast Louisiana (35–4)	Oklahoma State (28–15)	Florida State (40–15–1)	Florida State (41–15–1)	Oklahoma State (38–20)	Kansas (38–23)	17.
18.	Princeton	Cal State Fullerton (7–5)	Cal State Northridge (7–4–2)	Florida State (17–9)	Louisiana Tech (23–10)	Florida State (25–12)	Florida State (29–12)	Oklahoma State (27–13)	Florida State (38–14–1)	Utah (34–11)	Northeast Louisiana (43–8)	Arizona State (31–21)	Oklahoma (55–19)	18.
19.	Nebraska	Cal Poly (16–2)	Southwestern Louisiana (7–6)	Pacific (14–5)	Colorado State (21–8)	Louisiana Tech (23–10)	Northeast Louisiana (31–3)	Florida State (31–14–1)	Northeast Louisiana (39–6)	Oklahoma State (31–17)	Minnesota (34–15)	Cal State Northridge (34–18–2) т	Cal State Northridge (34–22–2)	19.
20.	Minnesota	Missouri (8–0)	Louisiana Tech (13–7)	Louisiana Tech (19–9)	Pacific (16–7)	California (20–15)	California (20–15)	Louisiana Tech (24–12)	Utah (28–11)	Northeast Louisiana (40–7)	Oklahoma State (34–18)	Northeast Louisiana (46–10) т	Northeast Louisiana (47–11)	20.
21.	Notre Dame	Princeton (0–0)	Utah (9–5)	Cal State Northridge (8–7–2)	Florida State (22–11)	Oregon State (16–9)	Louisiana Tech (23–12)	California (23–16)	Louisiana Tech (27–13)	Louisiana Tech (30–14)	Cal State Northridge (31–17–2)	Minnesota (37–19) т	DePaul (42–15)	21.
22.	Hawaii	Baylor (9–3)	Pacific (9–4)	Baylor (19–8)	Southwestern Louisiana (15–8)	Pacific (21–10)	Utah (22–9)	Utah (23–10)	California (25–18)	Southwestern Louisiana (41–15)	Southwestern Louisiana (43–15)	Southwestern Louisiana (44–16) т	Central Michigan (41–22)	22.
23.	UMass	UNLV (7–5)	UNLV (7–6)	Southwestern Louisiana (9–8)	Hawaii (21–12–1)	Northeast Louisiana (28–3)	Hawaii (25–15–1)	Kansas (26–12)	Cal State Northridge (26–14–2)	Kansas (33–16)	California (29–21)	LSU (43–12)	Arizona State (32–25)	23.
24.	Connecticut	Hawaii (10–7–1)	Baylor (13–6)	Northeast Louisiana (15–3)	Cal State Northridge (10–9–2)	Hawaii (23–15–1)	Pacific (23–12)	Pacific (25–12)	Kansas (27–14)	California (27–19)	LSU (40–9)	New Mexico State (33–22)	Michigan State (46–22)	24.
25.	Arizona State	Nicholls State (12–3)	Michigan State (9–2)	San Diego State (14–6)	Northeast Louisiana (20–3)	Baylor (25–12)	Kansas (21–12)	Hawaii (27–17–1)	Southwestern Louisiana (30–14)	Cal State Northridge (27–17–2)	Kansas (34–19)	California (31–23)	Nebraska (29–24)	25.
	Week 0 Jan 25	Week 1 Feb 26	Week 2 Mar 5	Week 3 Mar 12	Week 4 Mar 19	Week 5 Mar 26	Week 6 Apr 2	Week 7 Apr 9	Week 8 Apr 16	Week 9 Apr 23	Week 10 Apr 30	Week 11 May 7	Week Final May 28	
		Dropped: 19. Nebraska; 21. Notre Dame; 23. UMass; 24. Connecticut	Dropped: 18. Cal State Fullerton; 21. Princeton; 24. Hawaii; 25. Nicholls State	Dropped: 21. Utah; 23. UNLV	Dropped: 22. Baylor; 25. San Diego State	Dropped: 22. Southwestern Louisiana; 24. Cal State Northridge	Dropped: 21. Oregon State; 25. Baylor	None	Dropped: 24. Pacific; 25. Hawaii	None	Dropped: 21. Louisiana Tech	Dropped: 25. Kansas	Dropped: 15. Florida State; 16. Cal Poly; 21. Minnesota; 23. LSU; 24. New Mexico State	
