= 1997 UCLA Bruins softball team =

American college softball season

1997 UCLA Bruins softball

NCAA Regional No. 5 champion

Women's College World Series, runner-up
- Conference: Pacific-10 Conference
- Record: 49–14 (21–7 Pac-10)
- Head coach: Sue Enquist (9th season)
- Home stadium: Easton Stadium

1997 Pacific-10 Conference softball standings
	Conf.						Overall
Team	W		L		T	PCT	W		L		T	PCT
No. 1 Arizona ‍†‍‍^{y}	26	–	1	–	0	.963	61	–	5	–	0	.924
No. 2 UCLA ‍‍‍^{y}	21	–	7	–	0	.750	49	–	14	–	0	.778
No. 4 Washington ‍‍‍^{y}	16	–	11	–	0	.593	50	–	19	–	0	.725
No. 11 California ‍‍‍^{y}	13	–	14	–	0	.481	36	–	26	–	0	.581
Stanford ‍‍‍	10	–	18	–	0	.357	31	–	27	–	0	.534
No. 23 Arizona State ‍‍‍^{y}	9	–	19	–	0	.321	32	–	25	–	0	.561
Oregon ‍‍‍	9	–	19	–	0	.321	24	–	35	–	0	.407
Oregon State ‍‍‍	6	–	21	–	0	.222	29	–	34	–	1	.461
† – Conference champion y – Invited to the NCAA tournament As of May 31, 1997; Rankings from NFCA/USA Today

The 1997 UCLA Bruins softball team represented the University of California, Los Angeles in the 1997 NCAA Division I softball season. The Bruins were coached by Sue Enquist, in her ninth season as head coach. The Bruins played their home games at Easton Stadium and finished with a record of 49–14. They competed in the Pacific-10 Conference, where they finished second with a 21–7 record.

The Bruins were invited to the 1997 NCAA Division I softball tournament, where they swept the Regional and then completed a run to the title game of the Women's College World Series where they fell to champion Arizona.

== Personnel ==
=== Roster ===
1997 UCLA Bruins roster
Pitchers: - B'Ann Burns – senior; - Christa Williams; Catchers: - Johnna Mike	Infielders: - Julie Adams – sophomore; - Christie Ambrosi; - Laurie Fritz – junior; - Alleah Poulson – senior; Outfielders: - Courtney Dale – freshman; - Danielle Martin; - Nicole Ochoa	Utility: - Nikki Barbieri; - Lesley Feldman – sophomore; - Karen Hoshizaki; - Julie Marshall – sophomore; - Stacey Nuveman – freshman; - Kim Wuest – junior

=== Coaches ===
1997 UCLA Bruins softball coaching staff
- Sue Enquist - Head coach - 9th season
- Kelly Inouye-Perez – Assistant coach – 4th season
- Lisa Fernandez – Assistant coach – 1st season

== Schedule ==
Legend
	UCLA win
	UCLA loss
*	Non-Conference game

1997 UCLA Bruins softball game log
Regular season

January/February
Date	Opponent	Rank	Site/stadium	Score	Overall record	Pac-10 record
Jan 29	at Loyola Marymount*	No. 2	Los Angeles, CA	W 3–0	1–0	
Jan 29	at Loyola Marymount*	No. 2	Los Angeles, CA	W 1–0	2–0	
Feb 3	Saint Mary's*	No. 2	Easton Stadium • Los Angeles, CA	W 11–0^{5}	3–0	
Feb 3	Saint Mary's*	No. 2	Easton Stadium • Los Angeles, CA	W 13–0^{5}	4–0	
Feb 8	at No. 3 Fresno State*	No. 2	Bulldog Diamond • Fresno, CA	L 2–4	4–1	
Feb 8	at No. 3 Fresno State*	No. 2	Bulldog Diamond • Fresno, CA	L 3–4	4–2	
Feb 11	No. 14 Long Beach State*	No. 2	Easton Stadium • Los Angeles, CA	W 3–2	5–2	
Feb 11	No. 14 Long Beach State*	No. 2	Easton Stadium • Los Angeles, CA	L 0–2	5–3	
Feb 15	at No. 8 California	No. 2	Levine-Fricke Field • Berkeley, CA	L 0–7	5–4	0–1
Feb 15	at No. 8 California	No. 2	Levine-Fricke Field • Berkeley, CA	W 11–1^{5}	6–4	1–1
Feb 16	at Stanford	No. 2	Boyd & Jill Smith Family Stadium • Stanford, CA	W 1–0	7–4	2–1
Feb 16	at Stanford	No. 2	Boyd & Jill Smith Family Stadium • Stanford, CA	W 4–3	8–4	3–1
Feb 21	vs Utah*	No. 2	Rebel Softball Diamond • Paradise, NV	W 6–0	9–4	
Feb 21	vs No. 9 South Carolina*	No. 2	Rebel Softball Diamond • Paradise, NV	W 1–0	10–4	
Feb 22	vs Texas State*	No. 2	Rebel Softball Diamond • Paradise, NV	W 16–0^{5}	11–4	
Feb 22	vs Utah State*	No. 2	Rebel Softball Diamond • Paradise, NV	W 3–2^{8}	12–4	
Feb 23	at No. 13 UNLV*	No. 2	Rebel Softball Diamond • Paradise, NV	W 9–1^{5}	13–4	
Feb 28	vs Ball State*	No. 3	San Diego, CA	W 11–2^{5}	14–4	
Feb 28	vs UIC*	No. 3	San Diego, CA	W 2–0	15–4	
Feb 28	vs Oregon*	No. 3	San Diego, CA	W 19–0^{5}	16–4	

March
Date	Opponent	Rank	Site/stadium	Score	Overall record	Pac-10 record
Mar 1	at San Diego State*	No. 3	San Diego, CA	W 13–0^{5}	17–4	
Mar 1	vs No. 8 Oklahoma State*	No. 3	San Diego, CA	W 6–2	18–4	
Mar 2	vs Oregon State*	No. 3	San Diego, CA	W 5–0	19–4	
Mar 2	vs Loyola Marymount*	No. 3	San Diego, CA	W 1–0	20–4	
Mar 8	at No. 18 Cal State Northridge*	No. 3	Matador Diamond • Northridge, CA	W 9–2	21–4	
Mar 8	at No. 18 Cal State Northridge*	No. 3	Matador Diamond • Northridge, CA	W 8–3	22–4	
Mar 22	Oregon	No. 3	Easton Stadium • Los Angeles, CA	W 13–1^{5}	23–4	4–1
Mar 22	Oregon	No. 3	Easton Stadium • Los Angeles, CA	W 8–0	24–4	5–1
Mar 24	Oregon State	No. 3	Easton Stadium • Los Angeles, CA	W 5–2	25–4	6–1
Mar 24	Oregon State	No. 3	Easton Stadium • Los Angeles, CA	W 8–0	26–4	7–1
Mar 26	Stanford	No. 3	Easton Stadium • Los Angeles, CA	L 5–6^{10}	26–5	7–2
Mar 26	Stanford	No. 3	Easton Stadium • Los Angeles, CA	W 4–0	27–5	8–2
Mar 29	No. 1 Arizona	No. 3	Easton Stadium • Los Angeles, CA	L 1–4	27–6	8–3
Mar 29	No. 1 Arizona	No. 3	Easton Stadium • Los Angeles, CA	W 5–1	28–6	9–3

April
Date	Opponent	Rank	Site/stadium	Score	Overall record	Pac-10 record
Apr 6	at No. 9 Cal Poly*	No. 3	San Luis Obispo, CA	L 0–1	28–7	
Apr 6	at No. 9 Cal Poly*	No. 3	San Luis Obispo, CA	W 8–0	29–7	
Apr 9	No. 21 California	No. 3	Easton Stadium • Los Angeles, CA	W 6–5	30–7	10–3
Apr 9	No. 21 California	No. 3	Easton Stadium • Los Angeles, CA	W 3–0^{8}	31–7	11–3
Apr 12	at No. 6 Washington	No. 3	Husky Softball Stadium • Seattle, WA	L 6–7	31–8	11–4
Apr 12	at No. 6 Washington	No. 3	Husky Softball Stadium • Seattle, WA	W 5–1	32–8	12–4
Apr 18	at No. 2 Arizona	No. 4	Rita Hillenbrand Memorial Stadium • Tucson, AZ	L 0–11^{5}	32–9	12–5
Apr 18	at No. 2 Arizona	No. 4	Rita Hillenbrand Memorial Stadium • Tucson, AZ	L 6–10	32–10	12–6
Apr 20	at No. 11 Arizona State	No. 4	Tempe, AZ	W 2–0	33–10	13–6
Apr 20	at No. 11 Arizona State	No. 4	Tempe, AZ	W 8–6	34–10	14–6
Apr 25	at Oregon State	No. 4	Corvallis, OR	W 1–0	35–10	15–6
Apr 25	at Oregon State	No. 4	Corvallis, OR	W 4–0	36–10	16–6
Apr 26	at Oregon	No. 4	Howe Field • Eugene, OR	W 2–0	37–10	17–6
Apr 26	at Oregon	No. 4	Howe Field • Eugene, OR	W 8–4	38–10	18–6

May
Date	Opponent	Rank	Site/stadium	Score	Overall record	Pac-10 record
May 1	No. 6 Washington	No. 4	Easton Stadium • Los Angeles, CA	W 11–6	39–10	19–6
May 1	No. 6 Washington	No. 4	Easton Stadium • Los Angeles, CA	L 0–1	39–11	19–7
May 10	No. 14 Arizona State	No. 5	Easton Stadium • Los Angeles, CA	W 5–2	40–11	20–7
May 10	No. 14 Arizona State	No. 5	Easton Stadium • Los Angeles, CA	W 12–0^{5}	41–11	21–7

Postseason

NCAA Regional No. 5
Date	Opponent	Rank	Site/stadium	Score	Overall record	NCAAT record
May 16	Nicholls State	No. 5	Lady Cajuns Park • Lafayette, LA	W 3–0	42–11	1–0
May 17	Southwestern Louisiana	No. 5	Lady Cajuns Park • Lafayette, LA	L 1–4	42–12	1–1
May 17	Northeast Louisiana	No. 5	Lady Cajuns Park • Lafayette, LA	W 3–0	43–12	2–1
May 17	Southwestern Louisiana	No. 5	Lady Cajuns Park • Lafayette, LA	W 9–0^{5}	44–12	3–1
May 17	Southwestern Louisiana	No. 5	Lady Cajuns Park • Lafayette, LA	W 3–0	45–12	4–1

NCAA Women's College World Series
Date	Opponent	Rank (Seed)	Site/stadium	Score	Overall record	WCWS Record
May 22	(4) Fresno State	No. 5 (5)	ASA Hall of Fame Stadium • Oklahoma City, OK	W 2–0^{8}	46–12	1–0
May 23	(1) Arizona	No. 5 (5)	ASA Hall of Fame Stadium • Oklahoma City, OK	L 0–2^{14}	46–13	1–1
May 24	(6) Michigan	No. 5 (5)	ASA Hall of Fame Stadium • Oklahoma City, OK	W 7–3	47–13	2–1
May 25	(7) Washington	No. 5 (5)	ASA Hall of Fame Stadium • Oklahoma City, OK	W 4–3	48–13	4–0
May 25	(7) Washington	No. 5 (5)	ASA Hall of Fame Stadium • Oklahoma City, OK	W 1–0	49–13	4–1
May 26	(1) Arizona	No. 5 (5)	ASA Hall of Fame Stadium • Oklahoma City, OK	L 2–10^{5}	49–14	4–2

Rankings from NFCA/USA Today prior to the game, tournament seeds in parentheses.

== Ranking movements ==
Ranking movements Legend: ██ Increase in ranking ██ Decrease in ranking
	Week												
Poll	Pre	1	2	3	4	5	6	7	8	9	10	11	Final
NFCA/USA Today	2	3	3	3	3	3	3	3	4	4	4	5	2
