= 1997 NCAA Division I softball tournament =

- Teams: 32
- Finals site: ASA Hall of Fame Stadium; Oklahoma City, Oklahoma
- Champions: Arizona (5th title)
- Runner-up: UCLA (15th WCWS Appearance)
- Winning coach: Mike Candrea (5th title)
- MOP: Nancy Evans (Arizona)

The 1997 NCAA Division I softball tournament was the sixteenth annual tournament to determine the national champion of NCAA women's collegiate softball. Held during May 1997, thirty-two Division I college softball teams contested the championship. The tournament featured eight regionals of four teams, each in a double elimination format. The 1997 Women's College World Series was held in Oklahoma City, Oklahoma from May 22 through May 26 and marked the conclusion of the 1997 NCAA Division I softball season. The event returned to Oklahoma City after a one-year hiatus, and it has remained there ever since. Arizona won their fifth NCAA championship by defeating UCLA 10–2 in the final game. Arizona pitcher Nancy Evans was named Women's College World Series Most Outstanding Player.

== Regionals ==
=== Regional No. 1 - held at Tucson, Arizona ===
First Round
Nebraska	10^{6}
Arizona State	1
Arizona	11^{6}
Rider	2
Lower round 1
Arizona State	12^{6}
Rider	0

Semi-Finals
Nebraska	0
Arizona	2
Lower final
Nebraska	2
Arizona State	1

Finals
Arizona	5	—
Nebraska	1	—

Arizona qualifies for WCWS.

=== Regional No. 2 - held at Columbia, South Carolina ===
First Round
Kansas	3
South Florida	2
South Carolina	5
UNC Greensboro	0
Lower round 1
South Florida	2^{9}
UNC Greensboro	0

Semi-Finals
Kansas	0
South Carolina	1
Lower final
Kansas	3
South Florida	1

Finals
South Carolina	1	—
Kansas	0	—

South Carolina qualifies for WCWS.

=== Regional No. 3 - held at Iowa City, Iowa ===
First Round
Utah	3
Missouri	1
Iowa	2
DePaul	1
Lower round 1
Missouri	0
DePaul	1

Semi-Finals
Utah	1
Iowa	3
Lower final
Utah	0
DePaul	2

Finals
Iowa	6	—
DePaul	2	—

Iowa qualifies for WCWS.

=== Regional No. 4 - held at Fresno, California ===
First Round
Long Beach State	3
Cal State Northridge	0
Fresno State	7
California	0
Lower round 1
Cal State Northridge	2
California	3^{9}

Semi-Finals
Long Beach State	2
Fresno State	5^{10}
Lower final
Long Beach State	1
California	3

Finals
Fresno State	9	—
California	3	—

Fresno State qualifies for WCWS.

=== Regional No. 5 - held at Lafayette, Louisiana ===
First Round
Southwestern Louisiana	2
Northeast Louisiana	1
UCLA	3
Nicholls State	0
Lower round 1
Northeast Louisiana	1
Nicholls State	0

Semi-Finals
Southwestern Louisiana	4
UCLA	1
Lower final
UCLA	3
Northeast Louisiana	0

Finals
Southwestern Louisiana	0	0
UCLA	9^{5}	3

UCLA qualifies for WCWS

=== Regional No. 6 - held at Ann Arbor, Michigan ===
First Round
Central Michigan	1
Michigan State	0
Michigan	1
Cleveland State	0
Lower round 1
Michigan State	6
Cleveland State	0

Semi-Finals
Central Michigan	0
Michigan	3
Lower final
Central Michigan	6
Michigan State	4

Finals
Michigan	1	4
Central Michigan	3^{8}	0

Michigan qualifies for WCWS.

=== Regional No. 7 - held at Norman, Oklahoma ===
First Round
Oklahoma State	2
Oklahoma	0
Washington	8^{5}
Southwest Missouri State	0
Lower round 1
Oklahoma	7
Southwest Missouri State	2

Semi-Finals
Oklahoma State	2
Washington	5
Lower final
Oklahoma State	5
Oklahoma	3

Finals
Washington	10	—
Oklahoma State	9	—

Washington qualifies for WCWS.

=== Regional No. 8 - held at Amherst, Massachusetts ===
First Round
UMass	2
Boston College	0
Colorado State	10^{5}
Brown	0
Lower round 1
Boston College	6
Brown	2

Semi-Finals
UMass	0
Colorado State	2
Lower final
UMass	4
Boston College	1

Finals
Colorado State	1	2
UMass	3	3^{8}

UMass qualifies for WCWS.

== Women's College World Series ==
=== Participants ===
School	Conference	Record	Head coach	WCWS appearances† (Including 1997 WCWS)
Arizona	Pac-10	57–4	Mike Candrea	10
Fresno State	Western Athletic	52–12	Margie Wright	10
Iowa	Big Ten	51–7	Gayle Blevins	3
UMass	Atlantic 10	37–21–1	Elaine Sortino	2
Michigan	Big Ten	55–14–1	Carol Hutchins	3
South Carolina	SEC	63–3	Joyce Compton	3
UCLA	Pac-10	45–12	Sue Enquist	15
Washington	Pac-10	48–17	Teresa Wilson	2

†: Excludes results of the pre-NCAA Women's College World Series of 1969 through 1981.

=== Results ===
==== Bracket ====
First round
1	Arizona	2^{8}
8	UMass	1
4	Fresno State	0
5	UCLA	2^{8}
8	UMass	1
4	Fresno State	2
3	Iowa	3
6	Michigan	2
7	Washington	6
2	South Carolina	0
6	Michigan	1
2	South Carolina	0

Second round
1	Arizona	2^{14}
5	UCLA	0
4	Fresno State	7
3	Iowa	6
3	Iowa	1
7	Washington	5
6	Michigan	3
5	UCLA	7

Semifinals
1	Arizona	0	6
4	Fresno State	3	3
7	Washington	3	0
5	UCLA	4	1

Finals
1	Arizona	10^{5}
5	UCLA	2

==== Game results ====
Date	Game	Winner	Score	Loser	Notes
May 22	Game 1	Arizona	2 – 1 ^{8}	UMass	
May 22	Game 2	UCLA	2 – 0 ^{8}	Fresno State	
May 22	Game 3	Iowa	3 – 2	Michigan	
May 22	Game 4	Washington	6 – 0	South Carolina	
May 23	Game 5	Arizona	2 – 0 ^{14}	UCLA	
May 23	Game 6	Washington	5 – 1	Iowa	
May 24	Game 7	Fresno State	2 – 1	UMass	UMass eliminated
May 24	Game 8	Michigan	1 – 0	South Carolina	South Carolina eliminated
May 24	Game 9	Fresno State	7 – 6	Iowa	Iowa eliminated
May 24	Game 10	UCLA	7 – 3	Michigan	Michigan eliminated
May 25	Game 11	Fresno State	3 – 0	Arizona	Fresno State forces the If Necessary Game (Game 13)
May 25	Game 12	UCLA	4 – 3	Washington	UCLA forces the If Necessary Game (Game 14)
May 25	Game 13	Arizona	6 – 3	Fresno State	Fresno State eliminated
May 25	Game 14	UCLA	1 – 0	Washington	Washington eliminated
May 26	Championship Game	Arizona	10 – 2 ^{5}	UCLA	Arizona Wins 1997 WCWS

==== Championship Game ====
School	Top Batter	Stats.
Arizona Wildcats	Nancy Evans (P)	1-3 3RBIs 2B BB
UCLA Bruins	Julie Marshall (3B)	1-2 RBI HR

School	Pitcher	IP	H	R	ER	BB	SO	AB	BF
Arizona Wildcats	Nancy Evans (W)	5.0	5	2	2	1	3	20	21
UCLA Bruins	Christa Williams (L)	5.0	11	10	8	5	7	25	33

=== All-Tournament Team ===
The following players were members of the All-Tournament Team.

Position	Player	Class	School
P	Jamie Graves	Freshman	Washington
P	Danielle Henderson	Sophomore	Massachusetts
P	Christa Williams	Freshman	UCLA
C	Stacey Nuveman	Freshman	UCLA
1B	Leah O'Brien	Senior	Arizona
1B	Alleah Poulson	Senior	UCLA
2B	Nina Lindenberg	Junior	Fresno State
2B	Sara Pickering	Senior	Washington
SS	Christy Hebert	Senior	Iowa
3B	Melissa Gentile	Freshman	Michigan
OF	Alison Johnsen	Junior	Arizona
MOP	Nancy Evans	Junior	Arizona

== See also ==
- 1997 NCAA Division II softball tournament
- 1997 NCAA Division III softball tournament
- 1997 NAIA softball tournament
- 1997 NCAA Division I baseball tournament
