= Rider Broncs softball =

College softball team

Rider Broncs
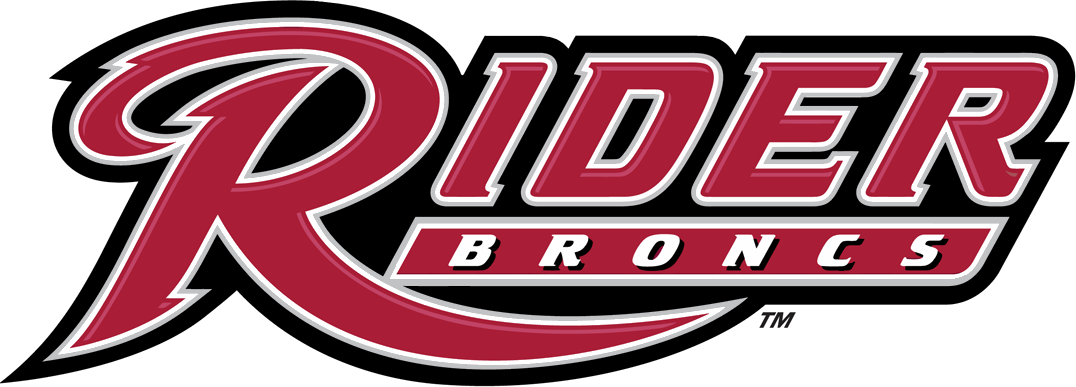
- University: Rider University
- Head coach: Davon Ortega (9th season)
- Conference: MAAC
- Location: Lawrenceville, New Jersey, US
- Home stadium: Herb & Joan Young Field
- Nickname: Broncs
- Colors: Cranberry, white, and gray

NCAA Tournament appearances
- 1997, 2003

Conference tournament championships
- NEC: 1995, 1997; MAAC: 2003

Regular-season conference championships
- 1992

The Rider Broncs softball team represents Rider University in NCAA Division I college softball. The team currently participates in the Metro Atlantic Athletic Conference (MAAC), having joined in 1998. From 1978 until 1992, the team was a member of the now-defunct East Coast Conference (ECC). From 1992 until 1997, the team was a member of the Northeast Conference (NEC). The Broncs are currently led by head coach Davon Ortega. The team plays its home games at Herb & Joan Young Field, which is located on the college's campus.

== History ==
Rider has the unique achievement of having won conference titles in three different conferences. The first conference title came in the 1991 East Coast Conference season, winning the conference with a 10–2 record in conference play. The second and third conference titles came in the Northeast Conference, winning in the 1995 and 1997 seasons. The Broncs fourth and latest conference title came in their current conference, the Metro Atlantic Athletic Conference, winning in 2003. Since the expansion of the NCAA Division I softball tournament in 1994, Rider has qualified for the tournament twice, doing so in 1997 and 2003. Despite winning the NEC in 1995, the Broncs were not automatically qualified for the NCAA tournament because the conference did not receive an automatic bid until 1996.

In the 1997 tournament, Rider faced off against Arizona in their first appearance of the tournament, losing 11–2 via mercy rule in six innings. The Broncs were eliminated from the tournament after losing to Arizona State by a score 12–0, losing again via the mercy rule in six innings.

Rider qualified for the 2003 NCAA Division I softball tournament after defeating Saint Peter's 2–1 in the MAAC tournament championship game. Pitcher Heather Beintema was named MVP of the tournament. The Broncs faced off against Cal State Fullerton in the opening game, losing by a score of 3–0. The team was eliminated from the tournament after losing a 2–1 contest to San Diego State.

In 2015, former head coach Patricia Carroll filed a lawsuit against the university, claiming she was fired for raising awareness about Title IX violations committed by the school's athletic program. The lawsuit claims that men's programs at the university receive larger shares of scholarship and booster money, as well as having larger coaching staffs than women's teams. In a period from 2011 until 2014, Carroll complained about the alleged violations to the school's Associate Vice President for Human Resources and Affirmative Action Robert Stoto. An outside consultant was hired by the university in 2013 and found the school to be in violation of Title IX, although Carroll's complaints continued into 2014. As a result, the lawsuit claims Carroll was informed in 2014 that her contract would not be renewed following the 2015 season.

=== Coaching history ===
Years	Coach	Record	%
1978–1980	Carol Knapp	22–24	.478
1981–1987	Laura Darling	119–97	.551
1988–1994	Leslie Craig Hagan	208–102	.671
1994–2015	Patricia Carroll	401–631–3	.389
2016–2017	Jaclyn Timko-Gabelt	14–86	.140
2017–present	Davon Ortega	165–251–1	.397

== Roster ==
2024 Rider Broncs roster
Pitchers: 13 – Anna-Marie Groskritz – Senior; 8 – Jadeyn Merrill – Sophomore; 1 – Jessie Niegocki – Senior; 33 – Kathryn Schmierer – Junior; 24 – Fallyn Stoeckel – Sophomore; Catchers: 18 – Abby Cruz – Freshman; 6 – Kristyn Gardner – Junior; 35 – Kendall Reda-Fehsal – Freshman; 31 – Amanda Royal – Freshman	Infielders: 28 – Kiersten Buchanan – Freshman; 16 – Olivia Burroughs – Junior; 3 – Olivia Smith – Freshman; 2 – Kayley York – Freshman; Outfielders: 22 – Asiah Bell – Junior; 19 – Amanda Cooper – Graduate Student; 12 – Shelby Dyer – Freshman; 26 – Maddie Luedtke – Sophomore; 66 – Tristen Wren – Freshman; 11 – Laneya Wright – Senior; Utility: 17 – Alina Borota – Freshman; 27 – Julia Harsche – Sophomore; 40 – Chelsea Weatherford – Junior

== Season-by-season results ==
Record table
Season	Coach	Overall	Conference	Standing	Postseason
Rider Broncs (East Coast Conference) (1978–1992)
1978	Carol Knapp	5–10			
1979	Carol Knapp	6–10			
1980	Carol Knapp	11–4			
1981	Laura Darling	13–6			
1982	Laura Darling	12–8			
1983	Laura Darling	11–17			
1984	Laura Darling	19–21			
1985	Laura Darling	20–14			
1986	Laura Darling	20–15			
1987	Laura Darling	24–16			
1988	Leslie Craig Hagan	29–14			
1989	Leslie Craig Hagan	33–13			
1990	Leslie Craig Hagan	30–16			
1991	Leslie Craig Hagan	21–12	10–2	1st	
1992	Leslie Craig Hagan	34–12			
Rider Broncs (Northeast Conference) (1992–1997)
1993	Leslie Craig Hagan	26–17	N/A	N/A	
1994	Leslie Craig Hagan	35–18	N/A	N/A	
1995	Patricia Carroll	34–12–1	N/A	1st	
1996	Patricia Carroll	24–22	N/A	N/A	
1997	Patricia Carroll	24–31	N/A	1st	NCAA Regionals
Rider Broncs (Metro Atlantic Athletic Conference) (1997–present)
1998	Patricia Carroll	22–24	7–9	N/A	
1999	Patricia Carroll	19–33	5–11	8th	
2000	Patricia Carroll	26–16	7–9	T–6th	
2001	Patricia Carroll	25–31	7–9	T–5th	
2002	Patricia Carroll	18–35	7–9	5th	
2003	Patricia Carroll	24–25	11–5	T–2nd	NCAA Regionals
2004	Patricia Carroll	35–22	11–5	2nd	
2005	Patricia Carroll	16–32	6–10	7th	
2006	Patricia Carroll	24–28	10–6	3rd	
2007	Patricia Carroll	11–36	3–11	T–8th	
2008	Patricia Carroll	12–34	4–12	9th	
2009	Patricia Carroll	16–32	8–8	6th	
2010	Patricia Carroll	16–31–1	8–8	T–5th	
2011	Patricia Carroll	9–37	2–14	8th	
2012	Patricia Carroll	20–33–1	7–9	T–6th	
2013	Patricia Carroll	8–41	3–13	8th	
2014	Patricia Carroll	6–41	3–7	T–10th	
2015	Patricia Carroll	12–35	6–14	9th	
2016	Jaclyn Timko-Gabelt	8–42	5–15	10th	
2017	Jaclyn Timko-Gabelt	6–44	1–19	11th	
2018	Davon Ortega	17–33	8–12	9th	
2019	Davon Ortega	10–44	6–14	10th	
2020	Davon Ortega	1–10	0–0	N/A	Season cut short due to COVID-19 pandemic
2021	Davon Ortega	17–20	16–18	7th	
2022	Davon Ortega	28–25–1	11–9	4th	
2023	Davon Ortega	19–31	9–11	T–7th	
2024	Davon Ortega	23–28	15–8	3rd	
2025	Davon Ortega	25–34	15–10	T–5th	
2026	Davon Ortega	25–24	14–13	8th	
Total:		929–1,161–4 (.445)			
National champion Postseason invitational champion Conference regular season champion Conference regular season and conference tournament champion Division regular season champion Division regular season and conference tournament champion Conference tournament champion

== See also ==
- List of NCAA Division I softball programs
