= Tamara Statman =

American-Israeli softball player (born 1997)

Tamara Statman Schoen
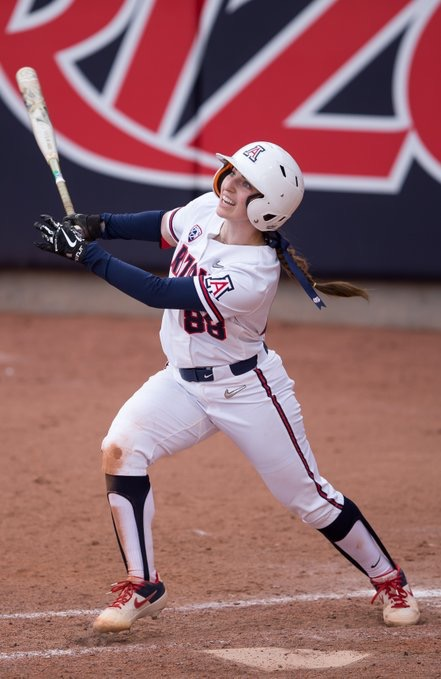

Arizona Wildcats Softball – No. 88
- Designated hitter/Pinch hitter/Pitcher
- Born: July 26, 1997 (age 28); San Diego, California, U.S.
- Bats: Left Throws: Right

Teams
- Arizona Wildcats Softball (2016–2019); Israel women's national softball team (2019–2021)

Tamara Schoen (née Statman; born July 26, 1997) is an American-Israeli softball player. She is a former collegiate Academic All-American, left-handed hitting designated hitter and pinch hitter originally from San Diego, California. She was a stand-out pitcher from Horizon High School in Scottsdale, Arizona. She went on to play college softball at the University of Arizona from 2015-2019. She was on the 2017 PAC-12 Championship Team and made an appearance at the Women's College World Series in 2019.

She played on the Israeli Women's National Softball Team for two European Championships.

== Early life and career ==
Born in San Diego, California, Statman moved to Phoenix when she 8 years old where she became known to all who knew her as "T" Statman.

In April 2015, T Statman was believed to be the third pitcher in the entire United States to reach 1,000 strikeouts from the high school pitching distance of 43 ft. She finished her high school career with 1071 strikeouts in 753.2 innings with a 1.77 ERA and 85 wins.

She raised money in high school for the Arizona Skin Cancer Foundation in high school through a program called “T's K's for Skin Cancer”.

She attended the University of Arizona in Tucson, Arizona. #88 T Statman did not pitch in college, T was a starter her freshman year and had a career batting average of .280 which included clutch at bats. Notably in 2016, the game winning single to secure the win against Tennessee in the Knoxville Regional Championship in the eighth inning. Also in 2019 in the Tucson regional versus Auburn with a pinch hit single versus to secure a 2-1 victory.

She had 100 career hits, 10 career home runs, and 62 RBIs. She was Arizona's first Academic-All American since 2010.

== Personal life ==
Statman is Jewish and holds USA / Israeli dual citizenship, becoming an Israeli citizen in 2019.

She started west coast swing dancing in college and interned at Nike corporate in 2017. She was involved in student radio at the University of Arizona's KAMP Radio for four years with her show “T-Time”. She was named Miss Tucson Del Sol 2020, as part of the Miss America Organization. As of 2019, Statman was working at Cumulus Radio in Tucson, Arizona.

In 2020, she wrote a book called The Real Deal Student Athlete Success Kit.

Statman got married in May 2021 to Josh Schoen whom she met at the Maccabiah Games in Israel. They welcomed their first child in 2024.

In 2025, Statman joined Project Max as an advisory board member. Project Max works to fight racism, antisemitism, and intolerance through sports.

== Career honors ==
2022

Israeli Softball Association Maccabiah Hall of Fame

2019

CoSIDA Academic All-America (Second Team)

CoSIDA Academic All-District (First Team)

Pac-12 All-Academic (First Team)

Wildcat Way Certificate of Distinction

2018

Wildcat Way Certificate of Excellence

2017

CoSIDA Academic All-District

Pac-12 All-Academic (First Team)

2012 - 2015

Horizon High School Person of Character Scholarship Award Winner

Horizon High School 4 time Husky Award Winner (only 4 time winner in school history)

2015 Horizon High School Female Athlete of the Year
