= Mike Candrea Field at Rita Hillenbrand Memorial Stadium =

Softball stadium at the University of Arizona

Coordinates: 32°14′0″N 110°56′45″W

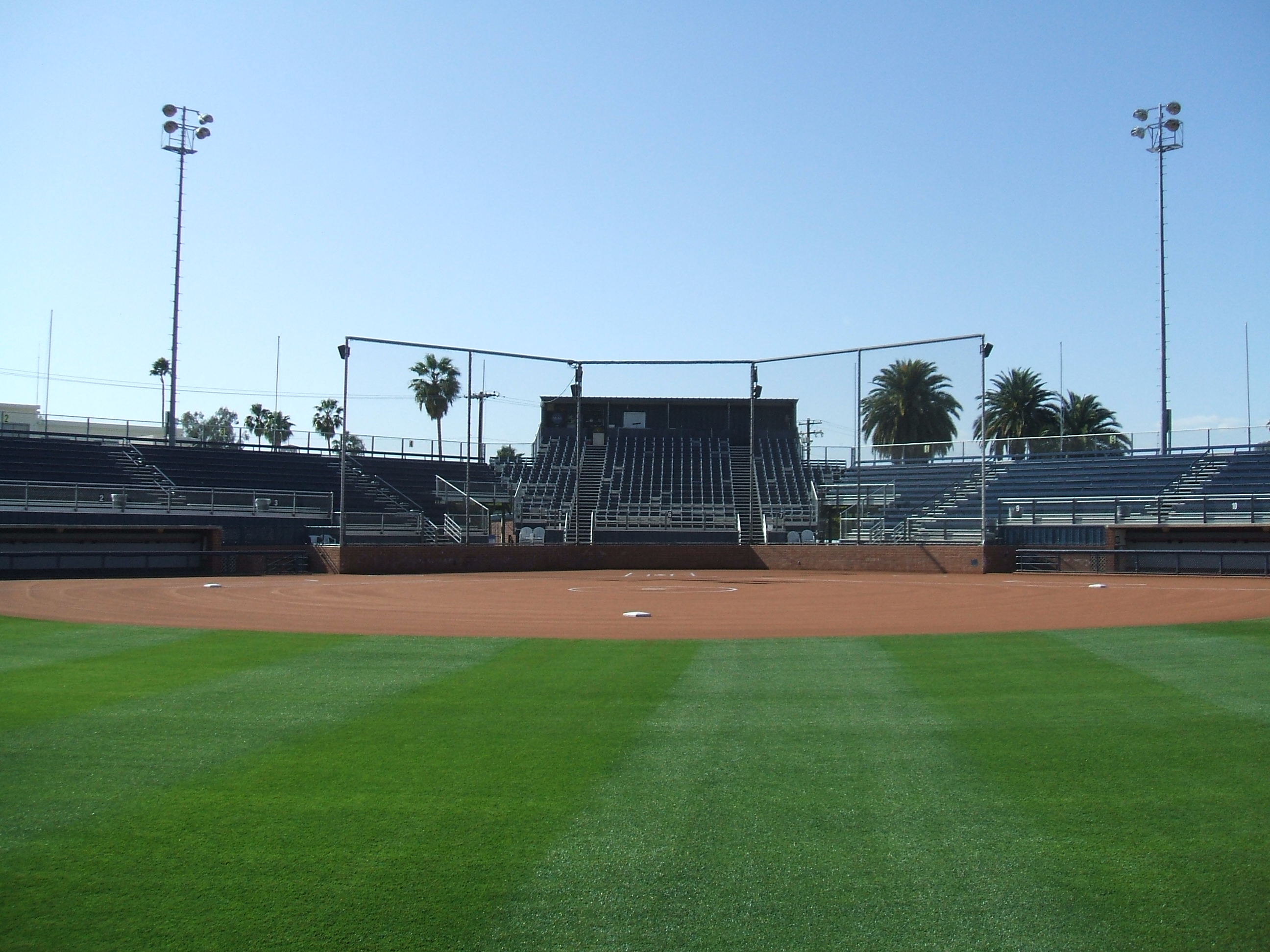
- Interactive map of Mike Candrea Field at Rita Hillenbrand Memorial Stadium
- Former names: Rita Hillenbrand Memorial Stadium (1993–2021)
- Location: Tucson, Arizona
- Owner: University of Arizona
- Operator: University of Arizona
- Capacity: 2,956
- Surface: Natural Grass

Construction
- Opened: 1993

Tenant
- Arizona Wildcats (NCAA) (1993-Present)

Mike Candrea Field at Rita Hillenbrand Memorial Stadium is the softball stadium for the University of Arizona. The stadium is on-campus and can seat 2,956 people.

Hillenbrand Stadium, as it is more commonly known, was completed in 1993 and is named for the sister of the late William G. Hillenbrand (the Hillenbrand family have been long time Arizona benefactors). With the continued success of the Arizona softball team, which has won eight national championships, thanks to Mike Candrea, remains one of the premier venues in college softball. The Wildcats led the NCAA in attendance from 2000 to 2002, and from 2006 to 2008.

On January 29, 2022, the university announced that, following Candrea's retirement and in agreement with the Hillenbrand family, Candrea's name would be added to the name of the stadium to honor his career.
