= UMass Minutewomen softball =

College softball team

- University: University of Massachusetts Amherst
- Head coach: Danielle Henderson (3rd season)
- Conference: Atlantic 10
- Location: Amherst, Massachusetts, US
- Home stadium: Sortino Field
- Nickname: Minutewomen
- Colors: Maroon and white

NCAA WCWS appearances
- 1992, 1997, 1998

NCAA super regional appearances
- 2006

NCAA Tournament appearances
- 1986, 1989, 1991, 1992, 1995, 1996, 1997, 1998, 1999, 2000, 2001, 2002, 2003, 2004, 2005, 2006, 2007, 2008, 2009, 2010, 2012

Conference tournament championships
- 1986, 1987, 1989, 1990, 1991, 1992, 1993, 1995, 1996, 1997, 1998, 1999, 2000, 2001, 2002, 2003, 2005, 2006, 2007, 2008, 2009, 2010, 2012

Regular-season conference championships
- 1986, 1988, 1989, 1991, 1992, 1993, 1994, 1995, 1996, 1997, 1998, 1999, 2000, 2001, 2002, 2003, 2004, 2006, 2007, 2008, 2009, 2010, 2012, 2018

The UMass Minutewomen softball team represents the University of Massachusetts Amherst in NCAA Division I college softball. The team participates in the Atlantic 10 Conference (A-10). The Minutewomen are currently led by head coach Danielle Henderson. The team plays its home games at Sortino Field located on the university's campus.

== History ==
Since joining the Atlantic 10 Conference in 1983, the Minutewomen have had a significant amount of success. UMass has won the Atlantic 10's regular season championship 24 times, the conference tournament 23 times, and qualified for the NCAA Division I softball tournament 21 times, all conference records.

The program rose to prominence after the hiring of Elaine Sortino in 1980. Under Sortino, the Minutewomen had one losing season in 34 years and advanced to the Women's College World Series three times, doing so in 1992, 1997, and 1998. In the 1992 NCAA Division I softball tournament, UMass qualified for the Women's College World Series after defeating and eliminating Connecticut and Utah State. After being defeated by eventual National Champions UCLA, the Minutewomen were sent to the loser's bracket. The team went on to defeat Florida State and Long Beach State, advancing to the final four of the tournament. They were again defeated and eliminated by UCLA.

In the 1997 tournament, UMass hosted their own regional for the first time in program history. The team defeated Boston College twice and Colorado State three times to advance to the Women's College World Series. The Minutewomen were eliminated from the tournament after losing to eventual National Champions Arizona and Fresno State. In the 1998 tournament, UMass again hosted their own regional and advanced to the Women's College World Series after defeating Boston College once and Oklahoma twice. The team was eliminated from the tournament after losing to Washington and Oklahoma State.

Sortino was named Atlantic 10 Coach of the Year 11 times, winning the award each year from 1991 to 1993, 1995, 1996, 2001, 2002, 2007 to 2009, and 2012. Kristi Stefanoni, who replaced Sortino after she died in 2013, was named A-10 Coach of the Year in 2018. UMass has won A-10 Player of the Year 15 times in its history, doing so each year from 1990 to 1993, 1996, 1999, 2001 to 2004, 2006, 2009, 2010, 2012, and 2018. The program has won A-10 Pitcher of the Year 17 times, winning in 1994, 1995, 1997 to 1999, 2001 to 2003, 2006 to 2012, and 2018.

Current head coach and former pitcher Danielle Henderson was named to the 2000 Summer Olympics, winning a gold medal with Team USA.

=== Coaching history ===
Years	Coach	Record	%
1975–1976	Jean Follansbee	4–15	.211
1977–1978	Diane Thompson	36–10	.783
1979	Chet Gladchuck	26–2–1	.914
1980–2013	Elaine Sortino	1,185–508–6	.699
2014–2021	Kristi Stefanoni	167–158–1	.514
2022–present	Danielle Henderson	36–66	.353

== Roster ==
2024 UMass Minutewomen roster
Pitchers: 6 – Julianne Bolton – Junior; 24 – Jenna Bradley – Senior; 22 – Natalee Horton – Sophomore; 51 – Hannah Streicher – Freshman; Catchers: 8 – Lydia Castro – Junior; 31 – Olivia Packard – Sophomore	Infielders: 21 – Grace Cadden – Junior; 10 – Riain Keefe – Sophomore; 13 – Bella Pantoja – Senior; 25 – Angie Rama – Sophomore; 23 – Taylor Richardson – Junior; 7 – Taylor Spexarth – Senior; 88 – Odyssey Torres – Freshman; Outfielders: 67 – Grace Colucci – Freshman; 15 – Jordyn Graime – Senior; 5 – Riley Kairer – Freshman; 17 – Payge Suggs – Senior; 2 – Giana Wameling – Junior; 12 – Chloe Whittier – Senior; Utility: 19 – Sarah Keagy – Senior; 3 – Abby Packard – Senior

== Season-by-season results ==
Record table
Season	Coach	Overall	Conference	Standing	Postseason
UMass Minutewomen (AIAW) (1975–1982)
1975	Jean Follansbee	1–7			
1976	Jean Follansbee	3–8			
1977	Diane Thompson	16–2			
1978	Diane Thompson	20–8			
1979	Chet Gladchuck	26–2–1			
1980	Elaine Sortino	23–3			
1981	Elaine Sortino	16–8			
1982	Elaine Sortino	18–7			
UMass Minutewomen (Atlantic 10 Conference) (1983–present)
1983	Elaine Sortino	28–10			
1984	Elaine Sortino	29–12	4-2		
1985	Elaine Sortino	25–23–1	5–5	4th	
1986	Elaine Sortino	36–9	8–2	1st	NCAA Regionals
1987	Elaine Sortino	35–12	6–4	T–2nd	NCAA Regionals
1988	Elaine Sortino	36–16	11–1	1st	
1989	Elaine Sortino	35–19	9–3	T–2nd	NCAA Regionals
1990	Elaine Sortino	27–20	9–3	2nd	
1991	Elaine Sortino	35–11	12–0	1st	NCAA Regionals
1992	Elaine Sortino	39–16	10–0	1st	Women's College World Series
1993	Elaine Sortino	33–20	9–1	1st	
1994	Elaine Sortino	31–19	8–2	1st	
1995	Elaine Sortino	40–22	9–1	1st	NCAA Regionals
1996	Elaine Sortino	38–15–1	14–0	1st	NCAA Regionals
1997	Elaine Sortino	37–23	12–3	1st	Women's College World Series
1998	Elaine Sortino	45–14	15–1	1st	Women's College World Series
1999	Elaine Sortino	43–10	13–1	1st	NCAA Regionals
2000	Elaine Sortino	35–23	13–3	1st	NCAA Regionals
2001	Elaine Sortino	44–13	21–0	1st	NCAA Regionals
2002	Elaine Sortino	53–13	21–0	1st	NCAA Regionals
2003	Elaine Sortino	38–15	11–1	1st	NCAA Regionals
2004	Elaine Sortino	34–17	11–1	6th	NCAA Regionals
2005	Elaine Sortino	37–16–1	13–3	2nd	NCAA Regionals
2006	Elaine Sortino	41–16	17–3	T–1st	NCAA Super Regional
2007	Elaine Sortino	39–14–1	18–0	1st	NCAA Regionals
2008	Elaine Sortino	42–13	20–0	1st	NCAA Regionals
2009	Elaine Sortino	41–10	16–2	1st	NCAA Regionals
2010	Elaine Sortino	42–10–1	17–0–1	1st	NCAA Regionals
2011	Elaine Sortino	29–19	14–5	2nd	
2012	Elaine Sortino	38–13	19–0	1st	NCAA Regionals
2013	Elaine Sortino	18–25	12–10	8th	
2014	Kristi Stefanoni	16–22–1	9–6–1	4th	
2015	Kristi Stefanoni	15–28	8–14	8th	
2016	Kristi Stefanoni	26–24	16–6	3rd	
2017	Kristi Stefanoni	29–24	13–6	2nd	
2018	Kristi Stefanoni	35–14	21–0	1st	
2019	Kristi Stefanoni	26–22	12–5	2nd	
2020	Kristi Stefanoni	4–7	0–0	N/A	Season cut short due to COVID-19 pandemic
2021	Kristi Stefanoni	16–17	12–12	5th	
2022	Danielle Henderson	19–32	12–12	T–6th	
2023	Danielle Henderson	17-34	8-18	8th	
2024	Danielle Henderson	20-35	14-12	6th	
2025	Danielle Henderson	14-33	6-17	9th	
Total:		1,468–782–8 (.656)			
National champion Postseason invitational champion Conference regular season champion Conference regular season and conference tournament champion Division regular season champion Division regular season and conference tournament champion Conference tournament champion

== See also ==
- List of NCAA Division I softball programs
