= Danielle Henderson =

American softball player and coach

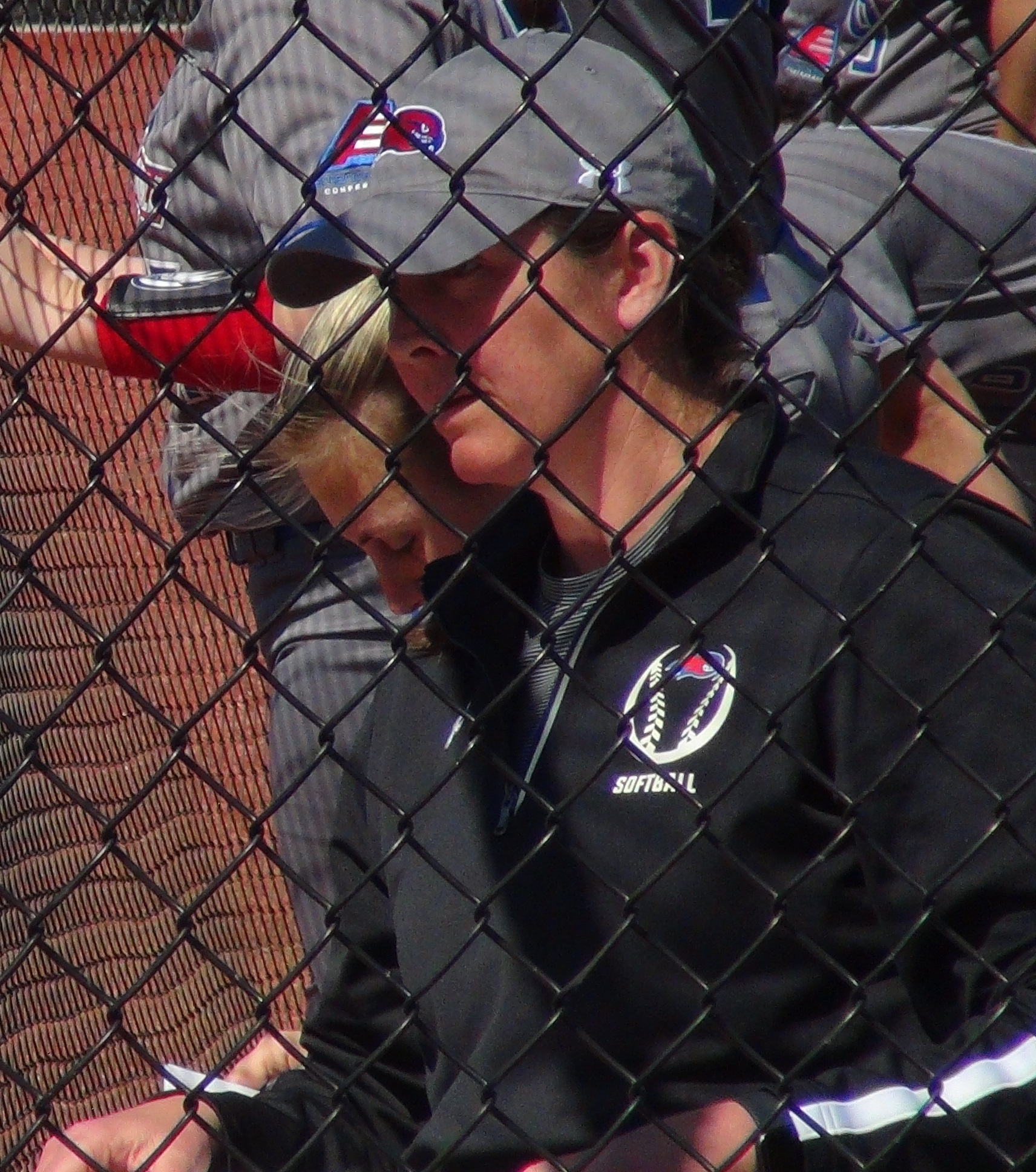
- Henderson in 2019

Current position
- Title: Head coach
- Team: UMass
- Conference: Atlantic 10

Biographical details
- Born: January 29, 1977 (age 49); Huntington, New York, U.S.

Playing career
- 1996–1999: UMass
- 2004: Arizona Heat
- 2005–2007: New England Riptide
- Position: Pitcher

Coaching career (HC unless noted)
- 2000–2003: UMass (asst.)
- 2011–2012: Ohio State (asst.)
- 2013: Stanford (asst.)
- 2014: UMass (assoc. HC)
- 2015–2021: UMass Lowell
- 2022–present: UMass

Head coaching record
- Overall: 118–163 (.420)

Accomplishments and honors

Awards
- Honda Sports Award (1999)
Medal record
Women's softball
Representing the United States
Olympic Games
Gold medal – first place	2000 Sydney	Team competition

Danielle Henderson (born January 29, 1977) is an American, former collegiate All-American, medal-winning Olympian, retired professional All-Star softball pitcher who is currently the head coach at UMass. Henderson was a starting pitcher for the UMass Minutewomen softball from 1996 to 1999. Henderson also played professionally in National Pro Fastpitch from 2004 to 2007, where she currently ranks top-10 in career strikeout ratio (6.8). Along with numerous school records, she is the Atlantic 10 Conference career leader in ERA, shutouts, perfect games (3) and WHIP. Henderson represented the United States at the 2000 Summer Olympics and won a gold medal.

== Early life and education ==
Born in Huntington, New York, Henderson grew up in nearby Commack and graduated from Commack High School in 1995.

== College ==
In her freshman season of 1996, Henderson led the team in wins, ERA, shutouts and strikeouts. Henderson threw her first no-hitter in the NCAA play-in opener against Marist Red Foxes.

In 1997 as a sophomore, Henderson would earn her first National Fastpitch Coaches Association All-American and Atlantic 10 Pitcher of Year awards, as well as tossing two no-hitters and breaking the UMass season records for strikeouts, innings pitched and strikeout ratio. Her wins and shutouts were at the time both second best in school history. For the year, Henderson won her first pitching Triple Crown for the conference best in wins, strikeouts and ERA, while ranked in the NCAA top-10 for both ERA and strikeout ratio.

On April 26, 1997, Henderson struck out a then school and a career best 18 Fordham Rams in regulation, this was tied third all-time for an NCAA single game and now is tied fourth overall. The day prior on April 25, Henderson also began a 63 scoreless inning streak that endured until May 17 for a then career best. UMass qualified for the 1997 Women's College World Series. However, Henderson was selected to the All-Tournament Team.

Throwing five no-hitters (NCAA top-5 season tying record and one perfect game vs. the Fordham Rams on March 29, 1998) earned her all-season honors from conference and the NFCA in her junior season of 1998, moving from third to the second Team. Henderson broke four school records with her wins, strikeouts, shutouts (still the record) and a strikeout ratio of nearly 12; along with her ERA, she won a second conference Triple Crown. In addition, she again cracked the top-10 NCAA Division I season records with her strikeouts (led the NCAA), shutouts and then second best all-time season strikeout ratio mark, which also led the NCAA that year.

A return trip to the Women's College World Series ended by shutout as the Minutewomen lost their second game to Oklahoma State Cowgirls and would be Henderson's last appearance in the series.

In her senior season of 1999, Henderson posted six no-hitters (another top-five tying NCAA season record), two perfect games and repeated all-season honors, including a First Team All-American highlight and her third straight Atlantic 10 Pitcher of The Year and pitching Triple Crown. Henderson won 30 games, struck out a then school and conference record (total led the nation) and tied the best season ERA mark at UMass. She had a career best WHIP and her strikeout ratio of 13.9, set a new NCAA season mark that is now 6th all-time. Her 105 scoreless innings streak from March 16 − May 2, 1999 remains the NCAA record.

Henderson closed her career at UMass with the best strikeouts, ERA, shutouts, wins, WHIP, innings pitched, strikeout ratio, perfect games and no-hitter numbers, of which she still owns the ERA, WHIP, perfect games and shutout crowns. She holds the same career records for the Atlantic 10. Finally, in the NCAA Henderson is tied 6th in no-hitters (14) and 5th in perfect games (3) all-time for a career.

In May 1999, Henderson was awarded the Honda Sports Award as the best softball player in the country.

After her playing career, Henderson served as a private pitching instructor and was an assistant coach with Ohio State and Stanford. She rejoined her alma mater UMass as associate head coach for the 2014 season and was head coach at UMass Lowell from 2015 to 2021.

== Professional softball career ==
=== 2000 Olympics ===
Henderson began playing for Team USA the summer after she graduated in 1999. On July 29, 1999, Henderson threw a perfect game defeating Colombia 9–0 at the start of the Pan American Games.

She competed at the 2000 Summer Olympics in Sydney where she received a gold medal with the American team. Her only game was a 3–0 win over Cuba.

=== National Pro Fastpitch ===
Henderson began playing with the rejuvenated National Pro Fastpitch in 2004 with the now defunct Arizona Heat. She debuted on June 1, throwing two innings in a loss. Beginning on June 7-July 31, Henderson won a career best 7 consecutive decisions in 12 games, 5 complete. She struck out 55 batters and surrendered 35 hits, 30 walks and 9 earned runs for a 1.05 ERA and 1.08 WHIP. With the New England Riptide on June 5, 2005, she tallied a career best 13 strikeouts in a 3-0 shutout victory. She currently ranks top-10 in career strikeout ratio at 6.8. In 2005, Henderson made the All-NPF East Team.

Although she did not play, Henderson also won a NPF Cowles Cup Championship with the defunct New England Riptide on August 28, 2006.

== Coaching career ==
Henderson had two stints as an assistant coach at UMass, first from 2000 to 2003 then as associate head coach in 2014. In between these stints, Henderson worked as a private pitching instructor before returning to college softball as assistant coach at Ohio State from 2011 to 2012 and Stanford under John Rittman in 2013.

On July 30, 2014, she was named head softball coach at the University of Massachusetts Lowell.

== Honors ==
In 2001, while serving a second term as Assistant Coach, the University of Massachusetts-Amherst ceremoniously retired Henderson's #44 jersey. In her last season with her the Minutewomen, Henderson was also inducted into the New England Women's Hall of Fame on September 24, 2002.

On October 9, 2009, Henderson was honored with an invitation into the UMass Hall of Fame.

== Career statistics ==
=== College ===
YEAR	W	L	GP	GS	CG	SHO	SV	IP	H	R	ER	BB	SO	ERA	WHIP
1996	23	8	33	30	24	11	0	197.2	124	56	27	76	113	0.96	1.01
1997	25	15	49	37	35	15	3	272.0	147	60	31	62	335	0.80	0.77
1998	30	8	42	35	33	23	2	256.0	112	38	26	84	430	0.71	0.76
1999	30	4	37	33	33	22	0	234.0	72	15	13	40	465	0.39	0.48
TOTALS	108	35	161	135	125	71	5	959.2	455	169	97	262	1343	0.71	0.74

=== Professional ===
YEAR	W	L	GS	CG	SHO	SV	IP	H	R	ER	BB	SO	ERA	WHIP
2004	8	4	14	9	2	1	94.2	62	32	22	49	83	1.63	1.18
2005	9	10	18	8	3	3	123.0	85	56	35	55	150	1.99	1.14
2006	7	4	14	3	1	1	82.0	83	41	33	53	64	2.81	1.66
2007	7	4	9	5	2	0	68.2	57	23	19	32	68	1.95	1.30
TOTALS	31	22	55	25	8	5	368.1	287	152	109	189	365	2.07	1.29

== Head coaching record ==
Record table
Season	Team	Overall	Conference	Standing	Postseason
UMass Lowell River Hawks (America East Conference) (2015–2021)
2015	UMass Lowell	17–30	5–11	6th	
2016	UMass Lowell	11–39	3–14	6th	
2017	UMass Lowell	21–19	12–5	2nd	
2018	UMass Lowell	21–28	12–5	2nd	
2019	UMass Lowell	28–20	15–3	1st	
2020	UMass Lowell	7–9	0–0		Season cancelled due to COVID-19
2021	UMass Lowell	13–18	9–7	4th	
UMass Lowell:		118–163 (.420)	56–45 (.554)		
UMass Minutewomen (Atlantic 10 Conference) (2022–present)
2022	UMass	19–32	12–12	T–6th	
2023	UMass	17–34	8–18	8th	
UMass:		36–66 (.353)	20–30 (.400)		
Total:		70–116 (.376)			

== See also ==
- NCAA Division I softball career wins list
- NCAA Division I softball career strikeouts list
- NCAA Division I softball career -1.00 ERAs list
