= Mike Candrea =

American softball coach

Biographical details
- Born: August 29, 1955 (age 71); New Orleans, Louisiana, U.S.
- Education: Central Arizona College; Arizona State University

Playing career

Baseball
- 1973–1974: Central Arizona
- Position: Second baseman

Coaching career (HC unless noted)

Baseball
- 1976–1980: Central Arizona (asst.)

Softball
- 1981–1985: Central Arizona
- 1986–2021: Arizona

Administrative career (AD unless noted)
- 2024: Arizona (interim AD)

Head coaching record
- Overall: 1,674–433–2 (.794)

Accomplishments and honors

Championships
- 8× Women's College World Series (1991, 1993, 1994, 1996, 1997, 2001, 2006, 2007); 11× Pac-12/10 Regular Season (1992, 1994, 1995, 1997, 1998, 2001, 2003, 2004, 2005, 2007, 2017)

Awards
- 4× Speedline/NFCA Division I (1994, 1996, 1997, 2007); 3× National Coach of the Year (1994, 1996, 1997); 12× Pac-12 Coach of the Year (1986, 1987, 1988, 1994, 1997, 1998, 2000–2003, 2007, 2017); NFCA West Region (2017); 3x Pacific Region Coach of the Year (1994, 1995, 1997); Northwest Region Coach of the Year (1988); CAC Hall of Fame (2009); USA National Softball Hall of Fame (2017); National Fastpitch Coaches Association Hall of Fame (1996); Arizona Softball Foundation Hall of Fame (2009); Pima County Sports Hall of Fame (1998)

Records
- 2nd on List of college softball coaches with 1,000 wins
Medal record
Head Coach for Women's Softball
Representing the United States
Olympic Games
Gold medal – first place	2004 Athens	Team competition
Silver medal – second place	2008 Beijing	Team competition
Head Coach for ISF Women's World Championship
Gold medal – first place	2002 Saskatoon
Gold medal – first place	2006 Beijing
Head Coach for World Cup of Softball
Silver medal – second place	2005 Oklahoma City
Gold medal – first place	2006 Oklahoma City
Gold medal – first place	2007 Oklahoma City
Head coach for Softball at the Pan American Games
Gold medal – first place	2003 Santo Domingo
Gold medal – first place	2007 Rio de Janeiro

John Michael Candrea (born August 29, 1955) is the former head softball coach and served as interim athletic director between February 2 and March 3, 2024 at the University of Arizona in Tucson, Arizona. He was the head coach of the United States women's national softball team in 2004, when Team USA won a gold medal, and in 2008, bringing home silver. At the time of his retirement in 2021, Candrea was the all-time winningest coach in college softball history, and ranked fourth of any coach in any NCAA sport with 1,674 wins.

== Education and career beginnings ==
Born in New Orleans, Candrea moved with his family to Phoenix at age seven. He graduated from Sunnyslope High School and later earned an associate degree at Central Arizona College in 1975, a bachelor's degree at Arizona State University in 1978, and a master's degree from Arizona State in 1980.

Candrea was an assistant baseball coach at Central Arizona from 1976 to 1980 and a softball coach from 1981 through 1985.

== University of Arizona ==
Under Candrea, the Arizona softball team has become one of the top programs in the United States and a perennial powerhouse in the NCAA. Candrea has coached at Arizona since 1986, where he has garnered 1610 NCAA wins, along with eleven Pac-10 Conference titles. Candrea also has ten Pac-10 coach of the year awards. The Arizona softball team has won eight Women's College World Series titles, in 1991, 1993, 1994, 1996, 1997, 2001, 2006, and 2007, all under Candrea. The team appeared in the NCAA Women's College World Series 16 consecutive years, from 1988 to 2003, and again from 2005 to 2010—22 appearances, all coming in the last 23 seasons. In addition, UA has appeared in 12 WCWS title games, including eight consecutive appearances, from 1991 and 1998. UA has most recently appeared in the 2001, 2002, 2006, 2007 and 2010 WCWS games. Under Candrea at UA, the number of WCWS appearances is second only to UCLA.

On March 26 he became the second coach in NCAA division 1 with 1,500 wins the fastest to ever do so. On March 5, 2019, Candrea won his 1,580th game tying him with Carol Hutchins of Michigan for most in NCAA Softball history. Later during the 2019 season, on April 19, Candrea defeated Stanford 9−1 to become only the second coach in NCAA softball history to reach the 1,600 win plateau, and the fastest coach to reach the milestone.

On June 7, 2021, the University of Arizona announced that Candrea would be retiring after 36 seasons as head coach. The next day Candrea officially announced his retirement at a farewell news conference in McKale Center. He finished his career as the winningest coach in collegiate softball history with 1,674 wins and fourth most of any coach in any NCAA sport. During his career he led the Wildcats to eight national championships, 24 appearances in the Women's College World Series, 34 postseason berths, and 10 conference championships.

== Head coaching record ==
The following lists Candrea's record as a head coach at the NCAA level.

Record table
Season	Team	Overall	Conference	Standing	Postseason
Arizona Wildcats (Pacific West Conference) (1986)
1986	Arizona	27–13–1	5–6–1	3rd	
Arizona Wildcats (Pacific-10 Conference) (1987–2003)
1987	Arizona	42–18	6–4	T–3rd	NCAA Regional
1988	Arizona	54–18	15–5	2nd	Women's College World Series
1989	Arizona	48–19	11–9	3rd	Women's College World Series
1990	Arizona	49–17	12–6	2nd	Women's College World Series
1991	Arizona	56–16	11–9	4th	WCWS Champions
1992	Arizona	58–7	16–2	1st	WCWS Runner-up
1993	Arizona	44–8	15–2	2nd	WCWS Champions
1994	Arizona	64–3	21–3	1st	WCWS Champions
1995	Arizona	66–6	24–4	1st	WCWS Runner-up
1996	Arizona	58–9	23–5	2nd	WCWS Champions
1997	Arizona	61–5	26–1	1st	WCWS Champions
1998	Arizona	67–4	27–1	1st	WCWS Runner-up
1999	Arizona	53–16	19–9	2nd	Women's College World Series
2000	Arizona	59–9	16–4	2nd	Women's College World Series
2001	Arizona	65–4	19–2	1st	WCWS Champions
2002	Arizona	55–12	15–6	2nd	WCWS Runner-up
2003	Arizona	56–7	19–2	1st	Women's College World Series
Arizona Wildcats (Pacific-10 Conference) (2005–2007)
2005	Arizona	45–12	13–8	1st	Women's College World Series
2006	Arizona	54–11	15–6	2nd	WCWS Champions
2007	Arizona	50–14–1	15–5–1	1st	WCWS Champions
Arizona Wildcats (Pacific-10/Pac-12 Conference) (2009–present)
2009	Arizona	46–17	13–7	3rd	Women's College World Series
2010	Arizona	52–14	13–8	3rd	WCWS Runner-up
2011	Arizona	43–18	11–10	T–3rd	NCAA Super Regional
2012	Arizona	38–19	12–12	T–4th	NCAA Super Regional
2013	Arizona	33–26	9–15	7th	NCAA Regional
2014	Arizona	44–16	14–10	5th	NCAA Super Regional
2015	Arizona	41–20	13–11	3rd	NCAA Super Regional
2016	Arizona	40–21	13–11	5th	NCAA Super Regional
2017	Arizona	52–8	18–7	1st	NCAA Super Regional
2018	Arizona	43–14	13–11	5th	NCAA Super Regional
2019	Arizona	48–14	19–5	3rd	Women's College World Series
2020	Arizona	22–3	0–0		Season canceled due to COVID-19
2021	Arizona	41–13	12–10	5th	Women's College World Series
Arizona:		1,674–433–2 (.794)	485–212–2 (.695)		
Total:		1,674–433–2 (.794)			
National champion Postseason invitational champion Conference regular season champion Conference regular season and conference tournament champion Division regular season champion Division regular season and conference tournament champion Conference tournament champion

== Team USA ==
Team USA won its third consecutive gold medal at the Athens Olympic Games. In addition, Candrea led the national team to two consecutive World Cup championships, most recently in 2007.

== Personal life ==
Candrea was married to Sue Ellen Hudson for 28 years until her tragic death in July 2004, 10 days before the Olympic Games. Candrea has two children from this marriage, Mikel and Michelle.

In 2005, Candrea welcomed his first grandchild from his daughter Michelle.

In 2006, Candrea married the former Tina Tilton. He gained two stepsons from his marriage with Tilton.

== See also ==
- List of college softball career coaching wins leaders
