= Leah O'Brien =

American softball player

Personal information
- Born: September 9, 1974 (age 51) Garden Grove, California, U.S.
Medal record
Women's softball
Representing the United States
Olympic Games
Gold medal – first place	1996 Atlanta	Team competition
Gold medal – first place	2000 Sydney	Team competition
Gold medal – first place	2004 Athens	Team competition

Leah Marie O'Brien-Amico (born September 9, 1974) is an American, former college softball outfielder, author, speaker and sports commentator. She is currently the head coach for the Florida Vibe of the Association of Fastpitch Professionals (AFP). She is best known for playing college softball at Arizona from 1993 to 1997, winning three National Championships, and earning gold medals at the 1996, 2000 and 2004 Summer Olympics. She is a USA Softball Hall of Fame honoree having been inducted in 2009.

== College career ==
Born in Garden Grove, California, O'Brien-Amico graduated from Don Lugo High School in nearby Chino in 1992 and attended the University of Arizona. Playing for the Arizona Wildcats softball team, she was named to the First Team All-Pac-10 for her freshman efforts. At the 1993 Women's College World Series, the Wildcats faced rival UCLA in the finale and with the only hit allowed, she drove in the game-winning run off Lisa Fernandez. It was Arizona's second title.

O'Brien-Amico earned First Team All-American honors to accompany conference honors. It was Arizona's second title. Her 16 doubles were the second best total and still rank top-10 for the Wildcats.

Returning to defend their title at the WCWS, O'Brien-Amico hit .750 (9/12 with 5 RBIs, a home run and two doubles) to set the tournament record for batting average. Eventually the Wildcats were able to successfully defend their title, besting the Cal State Northridge Matadors on May 30, 1994. O'Brien-Amico was perfect at the plate (3/3) and scored two runs against pitchers Jennifer Richardson and Amy Windmiller to be named All-Tournament.

For her junior year after red-shirting for the Atlanta Olympics, O'Brien-Amico earned all-season honors for a third straight year. She broke the school record for doubles and her 101 hits was a top-5 record. She still ranks top-10 all-time in both categories.

With her third straight appearance in the WCWS finals, O'Brien-Amico and the Wildcats again faced the UCLA Bruins but were defeated 4-2 on May 29, 1995. O'Brien-Amico went 2/3 with an RBI and was again named All-Tournament. The title was later vacated by the NCAA due to rules violations.

She earned her final First Team All-American and All-Pac-10 honors. With a career best .467 average, O'Brien-Amico collected 99 hits to rank top-5 for both stats and remains in the top-10 all-time for the Wildcats.

Concluding her finals streak at the WCWS, O'Brien-Amico won her third national championship over the UCLA Bruins and was a perfect 2/2 with two RBIs and two walks against hurler Christa Williams. She also scored two of Arizona's 10 runs in the mercy rule victory. She was named to the All-Tournament Team for a third series.

With combined stats from previous seasons, O'Brien-Amico had a WCWS career of .563 (31/55) with 19 RBIs, two home runs, 4 doubles and 7 walks, striking out just once with a slugging percentage of .745%. She also hit safely in 17 of 18 games, being shut out just once by Melanie Roche and the Oklahoma State Cowgirls on May 30, 1993. Beginning the next game of that doubleheader day with the ULL Ragin' Cajuns, O'Brien-Amico went on a 15-consecutive-game hit streak ending with her title in 1997.

O'Brien-Amico graduated atop the list for the Arizona Wildcats in career average and doubles. She also ranked top-10 for hits in the NCAA and still does at Arizona for her average and doubles.

== Coaching career ==
On March 6, 2024, Amico was named head coach for the Florida Vibe of the AFP.

== Team USA ==
For the Athens Olympics, O'Brien-Amico was the only collegiate athlete selected to the roster and hit .300 in 7 games and was perfect at right field. To open her Olympics career, O'Brien-Amico went 2/3 with a walk in a 10–0 mercy-rule win over Puerto Rico. She did not play the gold medal game.

At the 2000 Sydney Olympics she hit under .250 for the tournament. O'Brien-Amico nabbed hits in games with Italy, Japan, China and Australia running September 23–25, 2000. She drove in her only RBIs in a 6-0 win over Italy and in the gold medal game was shut out by Japan, though Team USA won 2-1 on September 26.

On the "Aiming For Athens" Tour, O'Brien-Amico hit .386 with 43 RBIs, 5 home runs and 9 doubles. Facing the Stanford Cardinal on February 20, 2004, O'Brien had a tour-high 3 RBIs on a home run to eventually win 9–0. In the Olympics, O'Brien-Amico had a tournament-best 2 RBIs off Melanie Roche of Australia on August 15; the US eventually won 10-0 run-ruling the Australians. She would equal her performance vs. Greece on August 19.

In the August 23 gold medal game, O'Brien-Amico had a single as the United States defeated Australia 5-1 to close out their dominating tournament in victory. She hit .200 for her final international tournament.

== Personal life ==
She is the daughter of Frederick G. O'Brien and Denise M. Lynch. In 2002, O'Brien-Amico was inducted into the University of Arizona Hall of Fame. She now lives in Eastvale, California with her husband Tommy and three children. She currently works in the ministry and occasionally offers color commentary for ESPN.

== Statistics ==
=== University of Arizona ===
YEAR	G	AB	R	H	BA	RBI	HR	3B	2B	TB	SLG	BB	SO	SB	SBA
1993	49	131	29	49	.374	24	0	0	4	53	.404%	19	6	5	7
1994	66	214	70	89	.416	45	3	1	16	116	.542%	35	6	4	6
1995	72	233	88	101	.433	62	2	3	21	134	.575%	31	6	10	11
1997	66	212	66	99	.467	50	2	1	14	121	.570%	23	7	11	15
TOTALS	253	790	253	338	.428	181	7	5	55	424	.536%	108	25	30	39

=== Team USA ===
YEAR	AB	R	H	BA	RBI	HR	3B	2B	TB	SLG	BB	SO	SB	SBA
1996	10	1	3	.300	0	0	0	0	3	.300%	2	1	0	0
2000	31	0	7	.226	2	0	0	0	7	.226%	3	0	1	1
2004	175	53	63	.360	48	5	0	10	88	.503%	18	10	0	0
TOTALS	216	54	73	.338	50	5	0	10	98	.453%	23	11	1	1

== Awards and honors ==
- Three-time NFCA First-Team All-American (1994, 1995 and 1997)
- WCWS National Champion (1993, 1994 and 1997)
- 3-Time Academic All American
- 3-Time First-team All-Pacific Region
- 4-Time All-Pac-10
- 3-time ASA All-American
- 1996 Atlanta Olympics Gold Medalist
- 1997 NCAA "Woman of the Year" (State of Arizona)
- 1998 ISF World Championships Gold Medalist
- 1999 Pan American Games Gold Medalist
- 2000 Sydney Olympics Gold Medalist
- 2002 University of Arizona Hall of Fame
- 2002 ISF World Championships Gold Medalist
- 2003 Pan American Games Gold Medalist
- 2004 Athens Olympics Gold Medalist

== See also ==
- NCAA Division I softball career .400 batting average list
