= Arizona Wildcats softball =

- 2026 Arizona Wildcats softball team
- Founded: 1974; 52 years ago
- University: University of Arizona
- Athletic director: Desireé Reed-Francois
- All-time Record: 2,101–683–2 (.754)
- Head coach: Caitlin Lowe (5th season)
- Conference: Big 12
- Location: Tucson, Arizona
- Home stadium: Mike Candrea Field at Rita Hillenbrand Memorial Stadium (capacity: 2,956)
- Nickname: Wildcats
- Colors: Cardinal and navy

NCAA Tournament champions
- 1991, 1993, 1994, 1996, 1997, 2001, 2006, 2007

NCAA WCWS runner-up
- 1992, 1995, 1998, 2002, 2010

NCAA WCWS appearances
- 1988, 1989, 1990, 1991, 1992, 1993, 1994, 1995, 1996, 1997, 1998, 1999, 2000, 2001, 2002, 2003, 2005, 2006, 2007, 2008, 2009, 2010, 2019, 2021, 2022

AIAW WCWS appearances
- 1974, 1975, 1977, 1979

NCAA super regional appearances
- 2005, 2006, 2007, 2008, 2009, 2010, 2011, 2012, 2014, 2015, 2016, 2017, 2018, 2019, 2021, 2022, 2024

NCAA Tournament appearances
- 1987, 1988, 1989, 1990, 1991, 1992, 1993, 1994, 1995, 1996, 1997, 1998, 1999, 2000, 2001, 2002, 2003, 2004, 2005, 2006, 2007, 2008, 2009, 2010, 2011, 2012, 2013, 2014, 2015, 2016, 2017, 2018, 2019, 2021, 2022, 2024, 2025, 2026

Regular-season conference championships
- 1992, 1994, 1995, 1997, 1998, 2001, 2003, 2004, 2005, 2007, 2017

The Arizona Wildcats softball team represents the University of Arizona in NCAA Division I Softball. Having claimed eight national championships (second only to former conference rival the UCLA), as the team is one of the most successful in the history of the sport. It plays its home games at Rita Hillenbrand Memorial Stadium in Tucson, AZ. The team was formerly coached by Mike Candrea, who began his UA coaching career in 1986 and announced his retirement on June 8, 2021. He retired as the all time winningest coach in Collegiate softball history with 1,674 wins, more Collegiate national titles with 8 and the fourth most wins of any coach in any NCAA sport.

On August 4, 2023, Arizona announced it that it would join the Big 12 Conference along with Arizona State, Colorado, and Utah beginning in the 2024-25 academic year.

== History ==
=== 1974 to 1985 ===
The Arizona Wildcats officially began softball play in 1974 under head coach Judy Spray in the Intermountain Conference. The first team in the school's history went 11–3 and participated in the Association for Intercollegiate Athletics for Women (AIAW) Women's College World Series (WCWS). The AIAW and Amateur Softball Association co-sponsored the Women's College World Series through 1982 (the NCAA held a separate tournament in 1982 when it began organizing women's softball). The 1975 team also played in the WCWS. In 1977, the Wildcats finished second in the WCWS, just missing out on winning the tournament. In 1979, the team once again qualified for the WCWS. However, after the 1979 season, the Wildcats failed to make the postseason again until 1987. From 1981 to 1986, the Wildcats were members of the Western Collegiate Athletic Association (WCAA), which renamed itself the Pacific West Conference (PacWest; not to be confused with the current NCAA Division II conference) for its final season. The WCAA/PacWest folded after the 1986 season when the then-Pac-10, home to all five of the final PacWest members, began sponsoring women's sports.

=== Mike Candrea era (1986–2021) ===
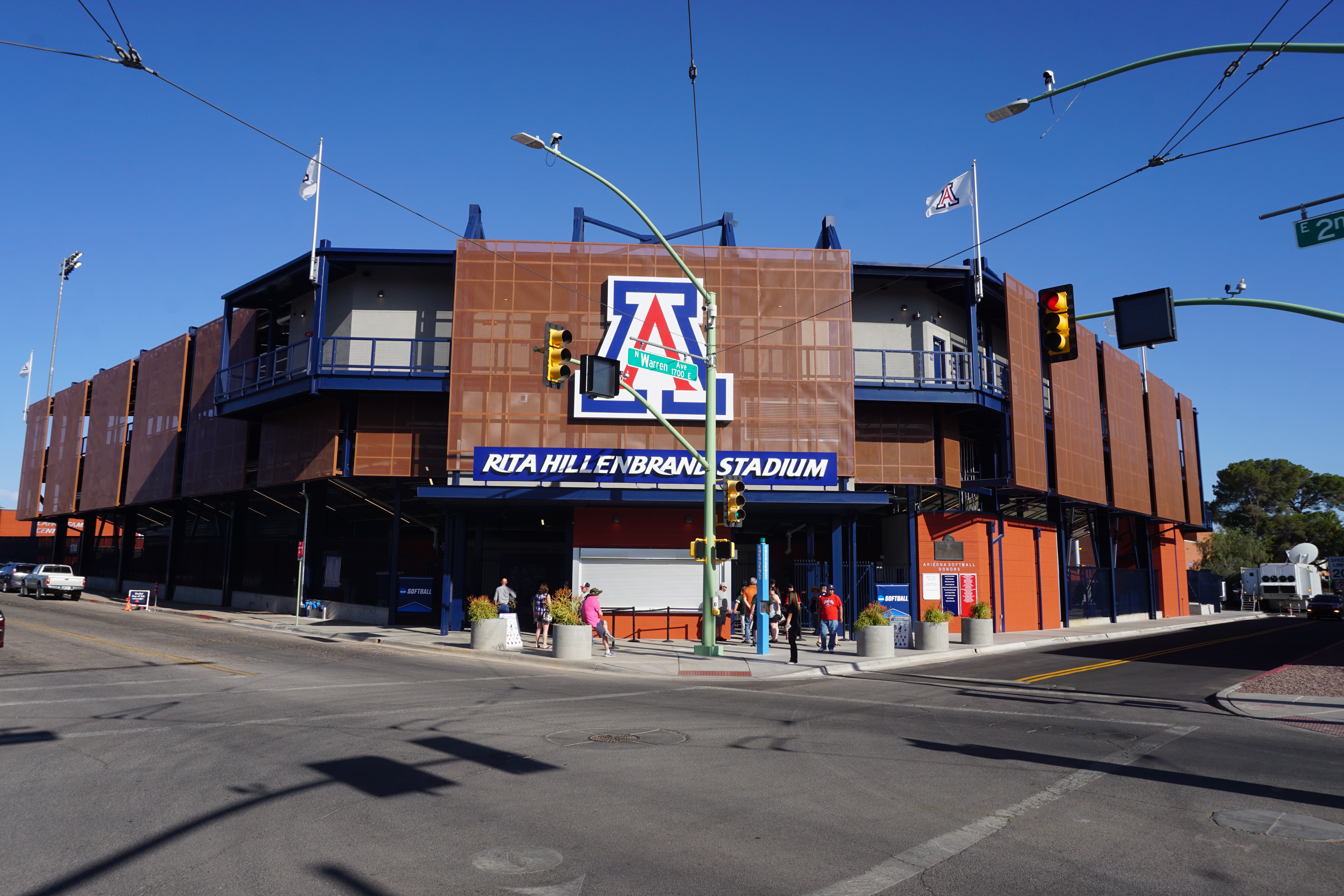
Rita Hillenbrand Memorial Stadium in 2019

Mike Candrea was hired for the 1986 season to build the Wildcats program. In his first season, the Wildcats won 29 games and missed out on the postseason. However, in 1987, Arizona won 42 games and made the NCAA tournament for the first time since the NCAA began sponsoring the sport. In 1988, Candrea guided the Wildcats to 54 wins and an appearance in the Women's College World Series where the team finished tied for third place. From 1988 to 2003, the Wildcats made sixteen straight appearances in the Women's College World Series. Arizona's first national championship season came in 1991. The Wildcats went 56–16 that year. In 1992, the Wildcats won the school's first Pac-10 title and finished runner-up at the Women's College World Series. The Wildcats continued their hot streak throughout the 1990s winning national championships in 1993, 1994, 1996, and 1997. The 1994 team went 64–3 and was ranked #1 throughout the year. Arizona also claimed the Pac-10 championship in 1994, 1995, 1997, and 1998. The Wildcats experienced continued success in the 2000s winning another national title in 2001 after finishing that year 65–4. The Wildcats won the 2001, 2003, 2004, 2005, and 2007 conference titles. Candrea left Arizona to coach the USA National team in the 2004 Olympics, and Larry Ray was named the interim coach for the 2004 season. The 2004 team won 55 games but lost to the Oklahoma Sooners in the Regionals, which marked the first time since 1987 that the Wildcats did not make it to the Women's College World Series. Candrea returned in 2005, and the Wildcats again returned to Oklahoma City for the World Series. The 2006 Arizona team defeated the Northwestern Wildcats to capture the Wildcats' seventh national title and their first since 2001. The 2007 Wildcats repeated as national champions by defeating the Tennessee Lady Volunteers in the championship series after losing the opening game of the series. Larry Ray again was tagged the interim coach in 2008 when Candrea coached the U.S. National Team at the 2008 Olympics. The 2008 team again made it to the Women's College World Series finishing tied for seventh in the eight team field. The Wildcats participated in the World Series in both 2009 and 2010 finishing tied for seventh and second respectively. In 2011, the Wildcats were eliminated in the NCAA Super Regional play by the Oklahoma Sooners.

=== Caitlin Lowe-Nagy era (2022–present) ===
Following the retirement of former head coach Mike Candrea, Lowe–Nagy was announced as the next head coach of the Arizona Wildcats softball program. Lowe–Nagy spent the last nine seasons under Candrea following a professional player with the USSSA Pride and internationally with Team USA, winning Silver Medal in the 2004 Summer Olympics. She also was a former player under Candrea, playing from 2004–2007 & had one of the most decorated careers of any player in Arizona history. A two-time national champion in 2006 & 2007, as well as numerous Arizona records such as: second in batting average (.446), fourth in hits (351), fourth in triples (12), seventh in runs scored (242) and first in stolen bases (156). She was unanimously named the greatest centerfielder of all time, both by a fan vote and by the 7Innings Podcast crew in its Greatest Softball Team of All-Time. Lowe–Nagy is one of only six Wildcat players to be named an NFCA All-American in each of her four years with the program and joined Leah Braatz (1994, 95, 97, 98) as the only player in Arizona history to be awarded first-team All-America all four years.

=== All-Americans ===
Arizona has had 60 different players selected to All-American teams for a total of 114 times. Arizona has had 6 four-time all-americans(Chellevold, Braatz, Bauer, Hollowell, Lowe & Lastrapes) 9 three-time all-americans(Parra, Espinoza, Dalton, O’Brien, McCutcheon, Pineda, Mascarenas, Giordano, Finch & Harper) & 15 two-time all-americans. Leticia Pineda became the first Division I softball player to be named a first team All-American at three different positions: catcher, third base & first base. Leah Braatz became Arizona's first four-time first team All-American. Caitlin Lowe became Arizona's second player to be a four-time first team All-American.

Player	Position	First Team Year
Karen Fellenz	2B	1984
Vivian Holm	LF	1990
Julie Standering	SS	1991
Debbie Day (2)	P	1992
Jody Miller-Pruit	C	1992
Jamie Heggen (2)	CF	1993
Susie Parra (2)	P	1993
Leah Braatz	C	1994
Amy Chellevold (3)	1B	1994
Jenny Dalton	2B	1994
Laura Espinoza (2)	SS	1994
Leah O'Brien	CF	1994
Susie Parra (3)	P	1994
Leah Braatz (2)	C	1995
Amy Chellevold (4)	1B	1995
Jenny Dalton (2)	2B	1995
Carrie Dolan	P	1995
Laura Espinoza (3)	SS	1994
Leah O’Brien (2)	CF	1995
Jenny Dalton (3)	2B	1996
Alison McCutcheon	LF	1996
Leticia Pineda	C	1996
Leah Braatz (3)	C	1997
Nancy Evans	P	1997
Alison McCutcheon (2)	LF	1997
Leah O’Brien (3)	CF	1997
Leticia Pineda (2)	3B	1997
Lauren Bauer	LF	1998
Leah Braatz (4)	C	1998
Nancy Evans (2)	P	1998
Toni Mascarenas	3B	1998
Alison McCutcheon (3)	LF	1998
Leticia Pineda (3)	1B	1998
Jennie Finch	P	2000
Lauren Bauer (4)	LF	2001
Jennie Finch (2)	P	2001
Leneah Manuma	1B	2001
Toni Mascarenas (3)	3B	2001
Jennie Finch (3)	P	2002
Leneah Manuma (2)	1B	2002
Autumn Champion	LF	2003
Alicia Hollowell	P	2003
Lovie Jung	SS	2003
Wendy Allen	DP	2004
Autumn Champion (2)	LF	2004
Alicia Hollowell (2)	P	2004
Caitlin Lowe	CF	2004
Kristie Fox	SS	2005
Caitlin Lowe (2)	CF	2005
Kristie Fox (2)	SS	2006
Caitlin Lowe (3)	CF	2006
Caitlin Lowe (4)	CF	2007
Brittany Lastrapes (2)	LF	2009
Kenzie Fowler	P	2010
Brittany Lastrapes (3)	LF	2010
Brittany Lastrapes (4)	LF	2011
Hallie Wilson	1B	2014
Jessie Harper	1B	2017
Danielle O'Toole	P	2017
Alyssa Palomino-Cardoza	1B	2018
Taylor McQuillin	P	2019
Dejah Mulipola	C	2019
Alyssa Palomino-Cardoza	OF	2018
Dejah Mulipola (2)	C	2021

Player	Position	Second Team Year
Teresa Cherry	P	1988
Nicki Dennis	3B	1990
Julie Jones	DP	1990
Julie Jones (2)	1B	1991
Jamie Heggen	CF	1992
Susie Parra	P	1992
Amy Chellevold (2)	1B	1993
Laura Espinoza	SS	1993
Jody Miller-Pruit (2)	C	1993
Krista Gomez	P	1996
Carrie Dolan (2)	3B	1996
Brandi Shriver	LF	1996
Lauren Bauer (3)	LF	2000
Nicole Giordano (2)	LF	2000
Toni Mascarenas (2)	3B	2000
Courtney Fossatti	RF	2003
Alicia Hollowell (3)	P	2005
Alicia Hollowell (4)	P	2006
Taryne Mowatt	P	2007
K’Lee Arredondo	SS	2010
Stacie Chambers (2)	C	2010
Brigette Del Ponte	3B	2011
Kenzie Fowler (2)	P	2011
Chelsea Goodacre	C	2015
Katiyana Mauga (2)	3B	2017
Mo Mercado	SS	2017
Reyna Carranco	2B	2019
Jessie Harper (2)	1B	2019
Allie Skagg	2B	2022
Allie Skagg (2)	2B	2023
Sydney Stewart	C	2025
Devyn Netz	P	2025

Player	Position	Third Team Year
Debby Day	P	1991
Amy Chellevold	1B	1992
Lauren Bauer (2)	LF	1999
Nicole Giordano	LF	1999
Becky Lemke	P	1999
Lindsey Collins	C	2000
Nicole Giordano (3)	LF	2001
Brittany Lastrapes	LF	2008
Laine Roth	1B	2008
Stacie Chambers	C	2009
Jenae Leles	3B	2009
Kellie Fox	SS	2014
Kellie Fox (2)	SS	2015
Katiyana Mauga	RF	2015
Jessie Harper (3)	SS	2021
Alyssa Denham	P	2021
Janelle Meoño	LF	2021
Dakota Kennedy	LF	2024
Dakota Kennedy (2)	LF	2025

== Head coaches ==
Name	Years	Seasons	Won	Lost	Tie	Pct.
Judy Spray	1974–1976	3	45	18	0	.714
Ginny Parrish	1977–1979	3	82	40	0	.672
Rocky LaRose	1980	1	23	23	0	.500
Paula Noel	1981–1985	5	103	93	0	.526
Larry Ray (Interim)	2004, 2008	2	96	25	0	.793
Mike Candrea	1986–2021	36	1,674	436	2	.793
Caitlin Lowe-Nagy	2022–present	5	190	96	1	.664
All-Time		52	2,208	730	3	.751

== Year-by-year results ==
Season	Coach	Record		Notes
Season	Coach	**Overall**	**Conference**	Notes
**Intermountain Conference**
1974	Judy Spray	11–3	—	**AIAW College World Series**
1975	Judy Spray	13–8	—	**AIAW College World Series**
1976	Judy Spray	21–7	—	
1977	Ginny Parrish	22–14	6–2	**AIAW College World Series**
1978	Ginny Parrish	16–11	3–6	
1979	Ginny Parrish	44–15	15–3	**AIAW College World Series**
**Western Collegiate Athletic Association**
1980	Rocky LaRose	23–23	2–14	
1981	Paula Noel	24–20	5–11	
1982	Paula Noel	21–20	6–14	
1983	Paula Noel	20–24	7–12	
1984	Paula Noel	28–16	5–5	
1985	Paula Noel	17–16	5–7	
**Pacific West Conference**
1986	Mike Candrea	27–13–1	5–6–1	
**Pacific-10/12 Conference**
1987	Mike Candrea	42–18	6–4	NCAA Regional
1988	Mike Candrea	54–18	15–5	**Women's College World Series**
1989	Mike Candrea	48–19	11–9	**Women's College World Series**
1990	Mike Candrea	49–17	12–6	**Women's College World Series**
1991	Mike Candrea	56–16	11–9	**Women's College World Series Champions**
1992	Mike Candrea	58–7	16–2	**Pac-10 Champions, Women's College World Series**
1993	Mike Candrea	44–8	15–3	**Women's College World Series Champions**
1994	Mike Candrea	64–3	23–1	**Pac-10 Champions, Women's College World Series Champions**
1995	Mike Candrea	66–6	24–4	**Pac-10 Champions, Women's College World Series**
1996	Mike Candrea	58–9	23–5	**Women's College World Series Champions**
1997	Mike Candrea	61–5	26–1	**Pac-10 Champions, Women's College World Series Champions**
1998	Mike Candrea	67–4	27–1	**Pac-10 Champions, Women's College World Series**
1999	Mike Candrea	53–16	19–9	**Women's College World Series**
2000	Mike Candrea	59–9	16–4	**Women's College World Series**
2001	Mike Candrea	65–4	19–2	**Pac-10 Champions, Women's College World Series Champions**
2002	Mike Candrea	55–12	15–6	**Women's College World Series**
2003	Mike Candrea	56–7	19–2	**Pac-10 Champions, Women's College World Series**
2004	Larry Ray	55–6	17–3	**Pac-10 Champions, NCAA Regional**
2005	Mike Candrea	45–12	13–8	**Pac-10 Champions, Women's College World Series**
2006	Mike Candrea	54–11	15–6	**Women's College World Series Champions**
2007	Mike Candrea	50–14–1	15–5–1	**Pac-10 Champions, Women's College World Series Champions**
2008	Larry Ray	41–19	13–8	**Women's College World Series**
2009	Mike Candrea	46–17	13–7	**Women's College World Series**
2010	Mike Candrea	52–14	12–8	**Women's College World Series**
2011	Mike Candrea	43–18	11–10	**NCAA Super Regional**
2012	Mike Candrea	44–16	12–12	**NCAA Super Regional**
2013	Mike Candrea	33–24	9–15	**NCAA Regional**
2014	Mike Candrea	44–16	14–10	**NCAA Super Regional**
2015	Mike Candrea	41–20	13–11	**NCAA Super Regional**
2016	Mike Candrea	40–21	13–11	**NCAA Super Regional**
2017	Mike Candrea	52–9	18–6	**Pac-12 Champions,** NCAA Super Regional
2018	Mike Candrea	43–14	13–11	NCAA Super Regional
2019	Mike Candrea	48–14	19–5	**Women's College World Series**
2020	Mike Candrea	22–3	0–0	Cancelled due to the COVID-19 pandemic
2021	Mike Candrea	41–15	12–10	**Women's College World Series**
2022	Caitlin Lowe-Nagy	39–22	8–16	**Women's College World Series**
2023	Caitlin Lowe-Nagy	29–25	6–18	
2024	Caitlin Lowe-Nagy	37–18–1	13–11	NCAA Super Regional
**Big 12 Conference**
2025	Caitlin Lowe-Nagy	48–13	17–7	NCAA Regional
2026	Caitlin Lowe-Nagy	37–18	15–6	NCAA Regional

=== NCAA Tournament seeding history ===
National seeding began in 2005. The Arizona Wildcats have been a national seed 14 of the 16 tournaments. Seeds in bold were national title seasons.

Years →	'93	'94	'95	'96	'97	'01	'02	'03	'05	'06	'07	'08	'09	'10	'11	'12	'14	'15	'17	'18	'19	'21	'25
**Seeds →**	**3**	**1**	1	**2**	**1**	**1**	2	1	3	**2**	**1**	7	9	10	8	13	11	12	2	14	6	11	13

== National championships ==
Arizona Wildcats Softball
National Champions 1991 50–15	National Champions 1993 44–8	National Champions 1994 64–3	National Champions 1996 58–9	National Champions 1997 61–5	National Champions 2001 65–4	National Champions 2006 54–11	National Champions 2007 50–14–1

=== Women's College World Series Most Outstanding Player ===
Player
Jenny Dalton 1996	Nancy Evans 1996	Jennie Finch 2001	Alicia Hollowell 2006	Taryne Mowatt 2007

== Retired jerseys ==
Retired Softball Jerseys

Jenny Dalton 16	Nancy Evans 13	Jennie Finch 27	Susie Parra 1	Julie Reitan 10

== Wildcats of note ==
Name	Seasons as Wildcat	Position	Accomplishment
Leah Braatz	1994–98	Catcher	Four Time 1st Team All American, Two Time National Champion (1994, 1996)
Jenny Dalton	1993–96	2nd Base	All-Time NCAA Career RBI (328) leader, Single Season Runs Scored (101) leader, Three Time 1st Team All American, Three Time National Champion (1993, 1994, 1996)
Laura Espinoza	1992–95	Shortstop	All-Time NCAA Single Season Home Run (37), RBI (128) & Total Bases (232) Record, Two Time 1st Team All American, Two Time National Champion (1993, 1994)
Nancy Evans	1994–98	Pitcher	NCAA Highest Career (Min 75 decisions) Winning Percentage (.939, 124−8), Two Time 1st Team All American, Three Time National Champion (1994, 1996, 1997)
Jennie Finch	1999–02	Pitcher	NCAA Consecutive Victory Record (60), Perfect Season Record (32−0), Three Time 1st Team All American, Olympic Gold Medal (2004), National Champion (2001)
Alicia Hollowell	2003–06	Pitcher	All Time Arizona Wins Leader (144), 17 Career No−Hitters, 4 Perfect Games, Two Time 1st Team All American, Olympic Silver Medal (2008), National Champion (2006)
Brittany Lastrapes	2008–11	Outfield	Three Time 1st Team All American
Caitlin Lowe	2004–07	Centerfield	Arizona All Time Steals Leader (156), Committed 0 Errors (234 Games), Four Time 1st Team All American, Olympic Silver Medal (2008), Two Time National Champion (2006, 2007)
Alison McCutcheon	1995–98	Outfield	Three Time 1st Team All American, All-Time NCAA Single Season (132) & Career Hits (405) leader, Two Time National Champion (1996, 1997)
Leah O'Brien	1993–97	Centerfield	Three Time 1st Team All American, Three Time National Champion (1993, 1994, 1997), Olympic Gold Medal (1996, 2000, 2004)

=== National awards ===
Honda Softball Award

- 1993-94 – Susie Parra
- 1995-96 – Jenny Dalton
- 1997-98 – Nancy Evans
- 2000-01 – Jennie Finch
- 2001-02 – Jennie Finch

USA Softball Female Athlete of the Year

- 2009 Jennie Finch
- 2015 Kellie Fox
- 2015 Alyssa Palomino-Cardoza (Junior Athlete of the Year)

ESPY Award

- 2007 Taryne Mowatt - Best Female Athlete, Best Female College Athlete

Lowe's Senior Class Award

- 2007 Caitlin Lowe

NFCA Golden Shoe Award

- 2007 Caitlin Lowe

NFCA Catcher of the Year

- 1997 Leah Braatz
- 1998 Leah Braatz
- 2019 Dejah Mulipola
- 2021 Dejah Mulipola

Coach of the Year

- 1986 Mike Candrea, Pacific-West co-honor
- 1987 Mike Candrea, Pac-10
- 1988 Mike Candrea, Northwest Region, Pac-10
- 1994 Mike Candrea, NSCA Div. I, National Coach of the Year, Pacific Region, Pac-10
- 1995 Mike Candrea, Pacific Region
- 1996 Mike Candrea, Speedline/NFCA Division I, National Coach of the Year
- 1997 Mike Candrea, Speedline/NFCA Division I, National Coach of the Year, Pac-10, Pacific-Region
- 1998 Mike Candrea, Pac-10
- 2000 Mike Candrea, Pac-10 co-honor
- 2001 Mike Candrea, Pac-10 co-honor
- 2002 Mike Candrea, Pac-10
- 2003 Mike Candrea, Pac-10
- 2007 Mike Candrea, Pac-10 Staff, NFCA Division I
- 2017 Mike Candrea, Pac-12 Staff, NFCA West Region

=== Conference awards ===
Pac-10 Conference Medal

- 1989 Stacy Engel
- 1995 Amy Chellevold
- 1996 Jenny Dalton
- 1997 Leah O'Brien
- 1998 Nancy Evans
- 2001 Lauren Bauer
- 2002 Jennie Finch
- 2003 Lovie Jung
- 2004 Wendy Allen

Pac-12 Player of the Year

- 1994 Susie Parra
- 1995 Laura Espinoza
- 1996 Jenny Dalton
- 1997 Alison McCutcheon
- 1998 Alison McCutcheon
- 2005 Caitlin Lowe
- 2017 Katiyana Mauga

Pac-12 Pitcher of the Year

- 2001 Jennie Finch
- 2002 Jennie Finch
- 2004 Alicia Hollowell
- 2017 Danielle O'Toole

Pac-12 Freshman of the Year

- 1994 Leah Braatz
- 1998 Toni Mascarenas
- 2002 Lovie Jung
- 2003 Alicia Hollowell
- 2004 Caitlin Lowe
- 2014 Katiyana Mauga
- 2021 Janelle Meoño

Pac-12 Defensive Player of the Year

- 2007 Caitlin Lowe
- 2014 Kellie Fox
- 2015 Hallie Wilson
- 2023 Allie Skaggs
- 2024 Tayler Biehl

Pac-12 Scholar Athlete of the Year

- 2007 Kelsey Rodriguez
- 2024 Allie Skaggs

Big 12 Player of the Year

- 2025 Devyn Netz
- 2026 Sydney Stewart

Big 12 Defensive Player of the Year

- 2026 Regan Shockey, Arizona

CoSIDA Academic All-Americans

- 1984 Kathy Jo Lanford
- 1985 Lisa Bernstein
- 1985 Kathy Jo Lanford
- 1986 Lisa Bernstein (2)
- 1994 Leah O'Brien
- 1995 Jenny Dalton
- 1995 Leah O'Brien (2)
- 1996 Jenny Dalton (2)
- 1997 Leah O'Brien (3)
- 1998 Nancy Evans
- 2004 Wendy Allen
- 2006 Autumn Champion
- 2010 K'Lee Arredondo
- 2019 Tamara Statman
- 2020 Jessie Harper
- 2021 Jessie Harper (2)
- 2021 Janelle Meoño
- 2023 Allie Skaggs
- 2024 Allie Skaggs (2)
- 2024 Dakota Kennedy
- 2025 Dakota Kennedy (2)

=== Record vs. Big opponents ===
The Arizona Wildcats lead the all-time series regardless of conference affiliation vs. ten other Big 12 opponents(Cincinnati, Colorado, Kansas State, TCU & West Virginia do not field a softball teams), trailing only UCLA.

Opponent	Wins	Losses	Ties	Pct.	Streak
Arizona State	109	64	1	(.629)	Arizona State 1
Baylor	18	9	0	(.667)	Arizona 3
BYU	14	2	0	(.875)	Arizona 3
Houston	10	0	0	(1.000)	Arizona 10
Iowa State	12	1	0	(.923)	Iowa State 1
Kansas	17	1	0	(.944)	Arizona 5
Kansas State	1	1	0	(.500)	Kansas State 1
Oklahoma State	23	16	0	(.590)	Oklahoma State 1
Texas Tech	13	7	0	(.650)	Texas Tech 2
UCF	3	3	0	(.500)	Arizona 2
Utah	52	18	0	(.743)	Utah 2

- Total (272–122–1, .690)
- Note all-time series includes non-conference matchups, Big 12 Tournament & Women's College World Series.

=== Record vs. Pac-12 opponents ===
The Arizona Wildcats lead the all-time series regardless of conference affiliation vs. eight other Pac-12 opponents(Colorado, USC & Washington State do not field a softball teams), trailing only UCLA.

Opponent	Wins	Losses	Ties	Pct.	Streak
Arizona State	109	64	1	(.629)	Arizona State 1
California	91	38	0	(.705)	California 2
Oregon	92	38	0	(.708)	Arizona 1
Oregon State	117	18	0	(.867)	Arizona 4
Stanford	88	19	1	(.819)	Stanford 3
UCLA	62	98	0	(.388)	Arizona 1
Utah	52	18	0	(.743)	Utah 2
Washington	73	47	0	(.608)	Arizona 1

- Total (684–340–2, .663)
- Note all-time series includes non-conference matchups, Pac-12 Tournament & Women's College World Series.

=== All-Time Statistical leaders ===
Batting Average, Career (225 AB)
Name	Years	Batting Average
Alison McCutcheon	1997–98	.466†
Caitlin Lowe	2004–07	.446
Leah O'Brien	1993–97	.428
Brittany Lastrapes	2008–11	.417
Autumn Champion	2003–06	.417

Hits, Career
Name	Years	Hits
Alison McCutcheon	1995–98	405†‡
Amy Chellevold	1992–95	371
Nicole Giordano	1998–01	359
Caitlin Lowe	2004–07	351
Lauren Bauer	1998–01	349

Home Runs, Career
Name	Years	Home Runs
Kaityana Mauga	2014–17	92†
Jessie Harper	2017–21	92†
Stacie Chambers	2008–11	87
Laura Espinoza	1992–95	85
Leah Braatz	1994–98	85

Runs Batted In, Career
Name	Years	RBI
Jenny Dalton	1993–96	328†‡
Leah Braatz	1994–98	322
Laura Espinoza	1992–95	314
Stacie Chambers	2008–11	293
Kaityana Mauga	2014–17	257

Runs Scored, Career
Name	Years	Runs
Jenny Dalton	1993–96	293†
Alison McCutcheon	1995–98	289
Brittany Lastrapes	2008–11	253
Amy Chellevold	1992–95	252
Leah Braatz	1994–98	250

Stolen Bases, Career
Name	Years	Stolen Bases
Caitlin Lowe	2004–07	156
Alison McCutcheon	1995–98	148
Lauren Bauer	1998–01	133
Vivian Holm	1987–90	129
Amy Chellevold	1992–95	113

Walks, Career
Name	Years	Walks
Jenny Dalton	1993–96	178
Leah Braatz	1994–98	173
Stacie Chambers	2008–11	158
Kaityana Mauga	2014–17	158
Brittany Lastrapes	2008–11	137

Games Played, Career
Name	Years	Walks
Julie Standering	1988–91	277
Toni Mascarenas	1998–01	276
Leah Braatz	1994–98	271
Nancy Evans	1994–98	271
Jennie Finch	1999–02	270

Earned Run Average, Career
Name	Years	ERA
Debbie Day	1991–92	0.44
Susie Parra	1991–94	0.63
Pam Stone	1982–84	0.73
Ginnie Scheller	1987–90	0.81
Julie Jones	1987–90	0.85

Victories, Career
Name	Years	W–L
Alicia Hollowell	2003–06	144–23
Nancy Evans	1994–98	124–8
Jennie Finch	1999–02	119–16
Carrie Dolan	1994–97	103–13
Becky Lemke	1998–01	103–19

Strikeouts, Career
Name	Years	Strikeouts
Alicia Hollowell	2003–06	1,768
Taryne Mowatt	2005–08	1,267
Jennie Finch	1999–02	1,028
Becky Lemke	1998–01	916
Susie Parra	1991–94	874

Career Shutouts(Solo/Combined)
Name	Years	Shutouts
Alicia Hollowell	2003–06	81/8
Jennie Finch	1999–02	64/7
Susie Parra	1991–94	61/1
Nancy Evans	1994–98	53/2
Becky Lemke	1998–01	44/9

Career No-Hitters(Solo/Combined)
Name	Years	No-Hitters
Alicia Hollowell	2003–06	16/1
Susie Parra	1991–94	8
Jennie Finch	1999–02	8
Taryne Mowatt	2005–08	6/1
Debbie Day	1991–92	6

† indicates Pac-12 record

‡ indicates NCAA record

== See also ==
- 2006 Women's College World Series
- 2007 Women's College World Series
- List of NCAA Division I softball programs
