= 2017 Oklahoma Sooners softball team =

American college softball season

2017 Oklahoma Sooners softball

National Champion NCAA Auburn Super Regional champion NCAA Norman Regional champion Big 12 tournament champion Big 12 regular season champion
- Conference: Big 12 Conference
- Record: 61–9 (17–1 Big 12)
- Head coach: Patty Gasso (23rd season)
- Home stadium: OU Softball Complex

2017 Big 12 Conference softball standings
	Conf.				Overall
Team	W		L	PCT	W		L	PCT
No. 1 Oklahoma ‍†‍‡‍^{y}	17	–	1	.944	61	–	9	.871
No. 7 Baylor ‍‍‍^{y}	13	–	5	.722	48	–	15	.762
Oklahoma State ‍‍‍^{y}	12	–	6	.667	38	–	25	.603
Texas ‍‍‍^{y}	7	–	10	.412	33	–	26	.559
Iowa State ‍‍‍	6	–	12	.333	23	–	35	.397
Texas Tech ‍‍‍	4	–	14	.222	19	–	36	.345
Kansas ‍‍‍	3	–	14	.176	24	–	28	.462
† – Conference champion ‡ – Tournament champion y – Invited to the NCAA tournament Rankings from NFCA

The 2017 Oklahoma Sooners softball team represented the University of Oklahoma in the 2017 NCAA Division I softball season. The Sooners were coached by Patty Gasso, who led her twenty-third season. The Sooners finished with a record of 61–9. They played their home games at OU Softball Complex and competed in the Big 12 Conference, where they finished first with a 17–1 record.

The Sooners were invited to the 2017 NCAA Division I softball tournament, where they swept the West Regional and then completed a run through the Women's College World Series to claim the NCAA Women's College World Series Championship.

== Roster ==
2017 Oklahoma Sooners roster
Pitchers: 8 – Paige Parker – junior; 14 – Paige Lowary – junior; 18 – Melanie Olmos – freshman; 42 – Mariah Lopez - Freshman; Catchers: 4 – Hannah Sparks – junior; 15 – Lea Wodach – junior	Infielders: 2 - Sydney Romero – sophomore; 3 – Kelsey Arnold – junior; 17 - Shay Knighten – sophomore; 20 – Caleigh Clifton – sophomore	Outfielders: 1 – Nicole Pendley – junior; 24 – Raegan Rogers – sophomore; 27 – Kylie Lundberg – sophomore; 33 – Vanessa Taukeiaho – freshman; 34 – Falepolima Aviu – sophomore; Utility: 6 – Macey Hatfield – senior; 11 - Nicole Mendes – freshman; 22 – Alissa Dalton – freshman

== Schedule ==
Legend
	Oklahoma win
	Oklahoma loss
*	Non-Conference game

2017 Oklahoma Sooners softball game log
Regular season

February
Date	Opponent	Site/stadium	Score	Overall record	Big 12 Record
Feb 9	vs No. 2 Auburn*	Nancy Almaraz Stadium • Puerto Vallarta, Mexico (Puerto Vallarta College Challenge)	L 2–3	0–1	
Feb 9	vs BYU*	Nancy Almaraz Stadium • Puerto Vallarta, Mexico (Puerto Vallarta College Challenge)	W 7–1	1–1	
Feb 10	vs Nebraska*	Nancy Almaraz Stadium • Puerto Vallarta, Mexico (Puerto Vallarta College Challenge)	W 6–0	2–1	
Feb 11	vs No. 13 Washington*	Nancy Almaraz Stadium • Puerto Vallarta, Mexico (Puerto Vallarta College Challenge)	L 0–1	2–2	
Feb 17	vs Incarnate Word*	Cougar Softball Stadium • Houston, TX (Houston Classic)	W 14–0^{5}	3–2	
Feb 17	vs Ole Miss*	Cougar Softball Stadium • Houston, TX (Houston Classic)	W 11–8	4–2	
Feb 18	at Houston*	Cougar Softball Stadium • Houston, TX (Houston Classic)	W 7–5^{8}	5–2	
Feb 18	at Houston*	Cougar Softball Stadium • Houston, TX (Houston Classic)	W 2–1^{8}	6–2	
Feb 23	vs Louisville*	Big League Dreams • Palm Springs, CA (Mary Nutter Classic)	W 2–1	7–2	
Feb 23	vs No. 15 Tennessee*	Big League Dreams • Palm Springs, CA (Mary Nutter Classic)	L 1–2	7–3	
Feb 24	vs NC State*	Big League Dreams • Palm Springs, CA (Mary Nutter Classic)	W 7–5	8–3	
Feb 24	vs No. 6 UCLA*	Big League Dreams • Palm Springs, CA (Mary Nutter Classic)	W 10–1^{5}	9–3	
Feb 25	vs Notre Dame*	Big League Dreams • Palm Springs, CA (Mary Nutter Classic)	L 4–5	9–4	

March
Date	Opponent	Site/stadium	Score	Overall record	Big 12 Record
Mar 1	at Wichita State*	Wilkins Stadium • Wichita, KS	W 7–3	10–4	
Mar 3	Northwestern State*	OU Softball Complex • Norman, OK (Courtyard Marriott Tournament)	W 3–0	11–4	
Mar 3	Evansville*	OU Softball Complex • Norman, OK (Courtyard Marriott Tournament)	W 13–3^{5}	12–4	
Mar 4	Western Kentucky*	OU Softball Complex • Norman, OK (Courtyard Marriott Tournament)	W 9–0^{5}	13–4	
Mar 4	Evansville*	OU Softball Complex • Norman, OK (Courtyard Marriott Tournament)	W 5–4	14–4	
Mar 5	Western Kentucky*	OU Softball Complex • Norman, OK (Courtyard Marriott Tournament)	W 2–1	15–4	
Mar 8	Tulsa*	OU Softball Complex • Norman, OK	W 1–0^{10}	16–4	
Mar 10	Omaha*	OU Softball Complex • Norman, OK (OU Tournament)	W 9–1^{5}	17–4	
Mar 10	Omaha*	OU Softball Complex • Norman, OK (OU Tournament)	W 8–0^{5}	18–4	
Mar 11	UIC*	OU Softball Complex • Norman, OK (OU Tournament)	W 16–1^{5}	19–4	
Mar 12	UIC*	OU Softball Complex • Norman, OK (OU Tournament)	W 8–0^{6}	20–4	
Mar 14	vs No. 5 Arizona*	49er Softball Complex • Long Beach, CA (Long Beach State Tournament)	L 3–4	20–5	
Mar 14	at Long Beach State*	49er Softball Complex • Long Beach, CA (Long Beach State Tournament)	W 14–0	21–5	
Mar 16	vs UC Santa Barbara*	Smith Field • Los Angeles, CA; LMU Tournament	W 8–1	22–5	
Mar 16	at Loyola Marymount*	Smith Field • Los Angeles, CA; LMU Tournament	W 6–4	23–5	
Mar 17	vs Cal Poly*	Smith Field • Los Angeles, CA; LMU Tournament	L 1–3	23–6	
Mar 18	vs Cal Poly*	Smith Field • Los Angeles, CA; LMU Tournament	L 1–3	23–7	
Mar 18	vs DePaul*	Smith Field • Los Angeles, CA; LMU Tournament	W 6–0	24–7	
Mar 24	Mississippi State*	OU Softball Complex • Norman, OK (College Preview Tournament)	W 5–3	25–7	
Mar 25	vs Louisiana Tech*	ASA Hall of Fame Stadium • Oklahoma City, OK (College Preview Tournament)	W 5–1	26–7	
Mar 25	vs UAB*	ASA Hall of Fame Stadium • Oklahoma City, OK (College Preview Tournament)	W 5–2	27–7	
Mar 26	UAB*	OU Softball Complex • Norman, OK (College Preview Tournament)	W 15–0^{5}	28–7	
Mar 31	Iowa State	OU Softball Complex • Norman, OK	W 7–1	29–7	1–0
Mar 31	Iowa State	OU Softball Complex • Norman, OK	W 20–0^{5}	30–7	2–0

April
Date	Opponent	Site/stadium	Score	Overall record	Big 12 Record
Apr 1	Iowa State	OU Softball Complex • Norman, OK	W 13–4^{6}	31–7	3–0
Apr 5	No. 25 Arkansas*	OU Softball Complex • Norman, OK	W 4–2	32–7	
Apr 7	at Texas	Red and Charline McCombs Field • Austin, TX	W 3–2	33–7	4–0
Apr 8	at Texas	Red and Charline McCombs Field • Austin, TX	W 3–1	34–7	5–0
Apr 9	at Texas	Red and Charline McCombs Field • Austin, TX	W 6–0	35–7	6–0
Apr 13	at Kansas	Arrocha Ballpark • Lawrence, KS	W 4–1	36–7	7–0
Apr 14	at Kansas	Arrocha Ballpark • Lawrence, KS	W 16–7^{5}	37–7	8–0
Apr 15	at Kansas	Arrocha Ballpark • Lawrence, KS	W 6–2	38–7	9–0
Apr 18	North Texas*	OU Softball Complex • Norman, OK	W 8–0	39–7	
Apr 22	No. 15 Baylor	OU Softball Complex • Norman, OK	W 3–2^{10}	40–7	10–0
Apr 23	No. 15 Baylor	OU Softball Complex • Norman, OK	L 3–4	40–8	10–1
Apr 23	No. 15 Baylor	OU Softball Complex • Norman, OK	W 6–0	41–8	11–1
Apr 28	at Texas Tech	Rocky Johnson Field • Lubbock, TX	W 4–2	42–8	12–1
Apr 29	at Texas Tech	Rocky Johnson Field • Lubbock, TX	W 12–0^{5}	43–8	13–1
Apr 30	at Texas Tech	Rocky Johnson Field • Lubbock, TX	W 14–3^{5}	44–8	14–1

May
Date	Opponent	Site/stadium	Score	Overall record	Big 12 Record
May 3	at Oklahoma State	Cowgirl Stadium • Stillwater, OK	W 3–0	45–8	15–1
May 5	Oklahoma State	OU Softball Complex • Norman, OK	W 6–2	46–8	16–1
May 6	at Oklahoma State	Cowgirl Stadium • Stillwater, OK	W 1–0	47–8	17–1

Postseason

Big 12 Tournament
Date	Opponent	Rank	Site/stadium	Score	Overall record	B12T Record
May 12	(4) Texas	(1)	ASA Hall of Fame Stadium • Oklahoma City, OK	W 2–0	48–8	1–0
May 12	(6) Texas Tech	(1)	ASA Hall of Fame Stadium • Oklahoma City, OK	W 8–0	49–8	2–0
May 13	(3) Oklahoma State	(1)	ASA Hall of Fame Stadium • Oklahoma City, OK	W 2–0	50–8	3–0

NCAA Norman Regional
Date	Opponent	Site/stadium	Score	Overall record	Reg. Record
May 19	North Dakota State	OU Softball Complex • Norman, OK	L 2–3^{9}	50–9	0–1
May 20	Arkansas	OU Softball Complex • Norman, OK	W 5–3	51–9	1–1
May 21	North Dakota State	OU Softball Complex • Norman, OK	W 10–2^{6}	52–9	2–1
May 21	Tulsa	OU Softball Complex • Norman, OK	W 6–4^{10}	53–9	3–1
May 22	Tulsa	OU Softball Complex • Norman, OK	W 3–0	54–9	4–1

NCAA Auburn Super Regional
Date	Opponent	Site/stadium	Score	Overall record	SR Record
May 26	(7) Auburn	Jane B. Moore Field • Auburn, AL	W 4–0	55–9	1–0
May 27	(7) Auburn	Jane B. Moore Field • Auburn, AL	W 5–2	56–9	2–0

NCAA Women's College World Series
Date	Opponent	Site/stadium	Score	Overall record	WCWS Record
June 1	(15) Baylor	ASA Hall of Fame Stadium • Oklahoma City, OK	W 6–3	57–9	1–0
June 2	(6) Washington	ASA Hall of Fame Stadium • Oklahoma City, OK	W 3–1	58–9	2–0
June 4	(3) Oregon	ASA Hall of Fame Stadium • Oklahoma City, OK	W 4–2	59–9	3–0
June 5	(1) Florida	ASA Hall of Fame Stadium • Oklahoma City, OK	W 7–5^{17}	60–9	4–0
June 6	(1) Florida	ASA Hall of Fame Stadium • Oklahoma City, OK	W 5–4	61–9	5–0
