= 2017 Big 12 Conference softball tournament =

- Teams: 6
- Finals site: ASA Hall of Fame Stadium; Oklahoma City, OK
- Champions: Oklahoma (5th title)
- Runner-up: Oklahoma State (3rd title game)
- Winning coach: Patty Gasso (5th title)
- MVP: Paige Parker (Oklahoma)
- Attendance: 3,172

2017 Big 12 Conference softball standings
	Conf.				Overall
Team	W		L	PCT	W		L	PCT
No. 1 Oklahoma ‍†‍‡‍^{y}	17	–	1	.944	61	–	9	.871
No. 7 Baylor ‍‍‍^{y}	13	–	5	.722	48	–	15	.762
Oklahoma State ‍‍‍^{y}	12	–	6	.667	38	–	25	.603
Texas ‍‍‍^{y}	7	–	10	.412	33	–	26	.559
Iowa State ‍‍‍	6	–	12	.333	23	–	35	.397
Texas Tech ‍‍‍	4	–	14	.222	19	–	36	.345
Kansas ‍‍‍	3	–	14	.176	24	–	28	.462
† – Conference champion ‡ – Tournament champion y – Invited to the NCAA tournament Rankings from NFCA

The 2017 Big 12 Conference softball tournament was held at ASA Hall of Fame Stadium in Oklahoma City, OK from May 12 through May 13, 2017. It was the first Big 12 softball tournament since 2010. Oklahoma won their fifth conference tournament and earned the Big 12 Conference's automatic bid to the 2017 NCAA Division I softball tournament.

Oklahoma, Baylor, Oklahoma State and Texas received bids to the NCAA tournament. Oklahoma and Baylor would go on to play in the 2017 Women's College World Series.

Oklahoma went on to win the 2017 National Championship.

== Standings ==
Place	Seed	Team	Conference			Overall		
Place	Seed	Team	W	L	%	W	L	%
1	1	Oklahoma	17	1	.944	61	9	.871
2	2	Baylor	13	5	.722	48	15	.762
3	3	Oklahoma State	12	6	.667	38	25	.603
4	4	Texas	7	10	.412	33	26	.559
5	5	Iowa State	6	12	.333	23	35	.397
6	6	Texas Tech	4	14	.222	19	36	.345
7		Kansas	3	14	.176	24	28	.462

- Kansas did not participate in the tournament

== Schedule ==
Game	Time	Matchup	Location	Attendance
Day 1 – Friday, May 12
1	11:05 a.m.	#3 Oklahoma State 2, #2 Baylor 1	ASA Hall of Fame Stadium	600
2	11:03 a.m.	#4 Texas 7, #6 Texas Tech 1	Integris Field	600
3	2:05 p.m.	#1 Oklahoma 3, #4 Texas 0	ASA Hall of Fame Stadium	1,157
4	2:00 p.m.	#3 Oklahoma State 10, #5 Iowa State 0 (5)	Integris Field	1,157
5	5:05 p.m.	#2 Baylor 4, #5 Iowa State 0 (9)	ASA Hall of Fame Stadium	1,157
6	7:30 p.m.	#1 Oklahoma 8, #6 Texas Tech 0	ASA Hall of Fame Stadium	1,157
Day 2 – Saturday, May 13
7	11:00 a.m.	#6 Texas Tech 1, #5 Iowa State 0	ASA Hall of Fame Stadium	1,415
8	1:40 p.m.	#2 Baylor 7, #4 Texas 0 (11)	ASA Hall of Fame Stadium	1,415
9	4:32 p.m.	#1 Oklahoma 2, #3 Oklahoma State 0	ASA Hall of Fame Stadium	1,415
Game times in CDT. Rankings denote tournament seed.

== All-Tournament Team ==
Position	Player	School
MOP	Paige Parker	Oklahoma
1B	Shelby Friudenberg	Baylor
2B	Caleigh Clifton	Oklahoma
3B	Sydney Romero	Oklahoma
CF	Jessie Scroggins	Baylor
CF	Nicole Pendley	Oklahoma
CF	Maddi Holcomb	Oklahoma State
RF	Nicole Mendes	Oklahoma
RF	Taylor Lynch	Oklahoma State
P	Kelsee Selman	Baylor
P	Paige Parker	Oklahoma
P	Brandi Needham	Oklahoma State
