= 1982 college softball season =

American college softball season

Tournament

Women's College World Series
- Champions: Texas A&M (AIAW); UCLA (NCAA )
- Runners-up: Oklahoma State (AIAW); Fresno State (NCAA)
- Winning Coach: Bob Brock (AIAW); Sharron Backus (NCAA)

Seasons
- ← 1981 1983 →

The 1982 college softball season, play of college softball in the United States began in February 1982. Two organizations sponsored end of season tournaments crowning a national champion: the AIAW and the NCAA. Both ended in an event called the Women's College World Series. The season progressed through the regular season, many conference tournaments and championship series, and concluded with the dueling tournaments in May 1982.

1982 was the final season of AIAW sports, and the first of NCAA-sanctioned women's sports.

The AIAW title was claimed by Texas A&M while the NCAA event crowned UCLA as champion. Following the season, the NCAA became the sole sponsor of top-level women's college athletics, as the AIAW folded.

== Conference standings ==
1982 Western Collegiate Athletic Association softball standings
	Conf.						Overall
Team	W		L		T	PCT	W		L		T	PCT
Cal State Fullerton ^{†y} ‍‍‍	17	–	3	–	0	.850	55	–	6	–	2	.889
UCLA ‍‍‍^{y}	15	–	4	–	1	.775	33	–	7	–	2	.810
Arizona State ‍‍‍^{y}	11	–	9	–	0	.550	34	–	18	–	0	.654
Arizona ‍‍‍	6	–	14	–	0	.300	14	–	17	–	0	.452
San Diego State ‍‍‍	6	–	14	–	0	.300	15	–	22	–	0	.405
Long Beach State ‍‍‍	3	–	17	–	0	.150	18	–	36	–	0	.333
† – Conference champion y – Invited to the NCAA tournament As of June 30, 1982; Rankings from Coaches' Poll

== AIAW Women's College World Series ==
The 1982 AIAW Women's College World Series took place from May 20 to May 25, 1982 in Norman, Oklahoma.

Upper round 1	Upper round 2	Upper round 3	Upper final	Final
Texas A&M	0
Ohio State	0	US International	1*^{8}
US International	1
US International	1
Michigan	2
Michigan	4
Oklahoma	0	Rhode Island	1
Michigan	1
Rhode Island	2
Oklahoma State	2
California	5
Southwest Missouri State	0	Central Michigan	0
California	0
Central Michigan	7
Oklahoma State	3
Utah	0
Western Illinois	0	Oklahoma State	2
Oklahoma State	7	Oklahoma State	1	3
Texas A&M	4	5^{8}
Lower round 1	Lower round 2	Lower round 3	Lower round 4	Lower final
Southwest Missouri State	0
Texas A&M	5
Texas A&M	2
Texas A&M	1	California	0
Western Illinois	0	Texas A&M	5
Western Illinois	2
Texas A&M	2	Michigan	0
Rhode Island	1
Central Michigan	0
Ohio State	0
Central Michigan	1^{10}
Central Michigan	1^{15}
Central Michigan	3^{8}	US International	0
Oklahoma	1
Oklahoma	4
Utah	2

== NCAA Women's College World Series ==
The 1982 NCAA Women's College World Series took place from May 27 to May 30, 1982 in Omaha, Nebraska.

Upper round 1
Arizona State	2^{9}
Cal State Fullerton	0
Creighton	2
Nebraska	3^{8}
Oklahoma State	1
UCLA	2^{13}
Fresno State	0
Western Michigan	5

Upper round 2
Arizona State	2
Nebraska	0
UCLA	1
Western Michigan	0
Lower round 1
Cal State Fullerton	4^{8}
Creighton	1
Oklahoma State	0
Fresno State	1^{14}

Upper final
Arizona State	0
UCLA	1
Lower round 2
Western Michigan	0
Cal State Fullerton	1^{8}
Nebraska	0
Fresno State	1

Semifinals
UCLA	1^{10}
Cal State Fullerton	0
Arizona State	1
Fresno State	4

Final
UCLA	2^{8}
Fresno State	0

== Season leaders ==
Batting

- Batting average: .470 – Cindy Bogucki, Evansville Purple Aces
- RBIs: 50 – Sue Lewis, Cal State Fullerton Titans
- Home runs: 9 – Sue Lewis, Cal State Fullerton Titans

Pitching

- Wins: 35-1 – Kathy Van Wyk, Cal State Fullerton Titans
- ERA: 0.15 (3 ER/137.1 IP) – Bonni Kinne, Western Michigan Broncos
- Strikeouts: 344 – Rhonda Clarke, Kansas Jayhawks

== Records ==
NCAA Division I season consecutive wins streak: 33 – Kathy Van Wyk, Cal State Fullerton Titans; January 30-May 27, 1982

Freshman class single game hits: 6 – Ann Schroeder, Nebraska Cornhuskers; May 8, 1982

Junior class single game hits: 6 – Cindy Aerni, Nebraska Cornhuskers; May 8, 1982

Senior class winning percentage: 35-1 (97%) – Kathy Van Wyk, Cal State Fullerton Titans
