= 2010 Big 12 Conference softball tournament =

- Teams: 10
- Finals site: ASA Hall of Fame Stadium; Oklahoma City, OK
- Champions: Oklahoma (4th title)
- Runner-up: Missouri (3rd title game)
- Winning coach: Patty Gasso (4th title)
- MVP: Keilani Ricketts (Oklahoma)
- Attendance: 3,916

2010 Big 12 Conference softball standings
	Conf.				Overall
Team	W		L	PCT	W		L	PCT
No. 18 Texas ‍†‍‍^{y}	14	–	2	.875	43	–	15	.741
No. 11 Oklahoma ‍‍‡‍^{y}	13	–	3	.813	47	–	12	.797
No. 20 Texas A&M ‍‍‍^{y}	12	–	6	.667	44	–	16	.733
No. 23 Oklahoma State ‍‍‍^{y}	12	–	6	.667	44	–	16	.733
No. 8 Missouri ‍‍‍^{y}	11	–	7	.611	51	–	13	.797
Nebraska ‍‍‍^{y}	7	–	11	.389	30	–	29	.508
Texas Tech ‍‍‍^{y}	7	–	11	.389	38	–	18	.679
Baylor ‍‍‍	6	–	12	.333	28	–	25	.528
Iowa State ‍‍‍	4	–	14	.222	26	–	29	.473
Kansas ‍‍‍	2	–	16	.111	21	–	35	.375
† – Conference champion ‡ – Tournament champion y – Invited to the NCAA tournament Rankings from NFCA

The 2010 Big 12 Conference softball tournament was held at ASA Hall of Fame Stadium in Oklahoma City, OK from May 15 through May 16, 2010. Oklahoma won their fourth conference tournament and earned the Big 12 Conference's automatic bid to the 2010 NCAA Division I softball tournament.

Texas, Oklahoma, Texas A&M, Oklahoma State, Missouri, Nebraska and Texas Tech received bids to the NCAA tournament. Missouri would go on to play in the 2010 Women's College World Series.

After the 2010 season, the Big 12 would discontinue to the softball conference tournament. It would not return until 2017.

== Standings ==
Place	Seed	Team	Conference			Overall		
Place	Seed	Team	W	L	%	W	L	%
1	1	Texas	14	2	.875	43	15	.741
2	2	Oklahoma	13	3	.813	47	12	.797
3	3	Texas A&M	12	6	.667	44	16	.733
3	4	Oklahoma State	12	6	.667	44	16	.733
5	5	Missouri	11	7	.611	51	13	.797
6	6	Nebraska	7	11	.389	30	29	.508
6	7	Texas Tech	7	11	.389	38	18	.679
8	8	Baylor	6	12	.333	28	25	.528
9	9	Iowa State	4	14	.222	26	29	.473
10	10	Kansas	2	16	.111	21	35	.375

== Schedule ==
Game	Time	Matchup	Location	Attendance
Day 1 – Saturday, May 15
1	11:00 a.m.	#7 Texas Tech 5, #10 Kansas 3	Hall of Fame Stadium	1,171
2	11:00 a.m.	#8 Baylor 15, #9 Iowa State 4 (5)	Field 4	1,171
3	1:53 p.m.	#2 Oklahoma 2, #7 Texas Tech 0	Field 4	1,171
5	1:55 p.m.	#1 Texas 3, #8 Baylor 2 (9)	Hall of Fame Stadium	1,171
4	5:00 p.m.	#3 Texas A&M 5, #6 Nebraska 0	Hall of Fame Stadium	1,512
6	5:00 p.m.	#5 Missouri 5, #4 Oklahoma State 0	Field 4	1,512
7	7:36 p.m.	#2 Oklahoma 5, #3 Texas A&M 1	Field 4	1,512
8	7:35 p.m.	#5 Missouri 11, #1 Texas 6 (11)	Hall of Fame Stadium	1,512
Day 2 – Sunday, May 16
9	12:00 p.m.	#2 Oklahoma 9, #5 Missouri 0 (6)	Hall of Fame Stadium	1,233
Game times in CDT. Rankings denote tournament seed.

== All-Tournament Team ==
Position	Player	School
MOP	Keilani Ricketts	Oklahoma
1B	Ashley Fleming	Missouri
1B	Jessica Shults	Oklahoma
2B	Amber Flores	Oklahoma
IF	Megan Turk	Baylor
IF	Jenna JJ Marston	Missouri
C	Courtney Nieten	Baylor
C	Lindsey Vandever	Oklahoma
C	Meagan May	Texas A&M
C	Holley Gentsch	Texas Tech
CF	Rhea Taylor	Missouri
P	Keilani Ricketts	Oklahoma
P	Jana Hainey	Missouri
P	Melissa Dumezich	Texas A&M
