= 2017 UCLA Bruins softball team =

American college softball season

2017 UCLA Bruins softball

NCAA Los Angeles Super Regional champion NCAA Los Angeles Regional champion

Women's College World Series, 1–2
- Conference: Pac-12 Conference
- Record: 48–15 (16–8 Pac-12)
- Head coach: Kelly Inouye-Perez (11th season)
- Home stadium: Easton Stadium

2017 Pac-12 Conference softball standings
	Conf.				Overall
Team	W		L	PCT	W		L	PCT
No. 9 Arizona ‍†‍‍^{y}	18	–	6	.750	52	–	9	.852
No. 4 Oregon ‍‍‍^{y}	17	–	6	.739	54	–	8	.871
No. 3 Washington ‍‍‍^{y}	16	–	8	.667	50	–	14	.781
No. 5 UCLA ‍‍‍^{y}	16	–	8	.667	48	–	15	.762
No. 14 Utah ‍‍‍^{y}	13	–	9	.591	37	–	16	.698
No. 23 Arizona State ‍‍‍^{y}	9	–	15	.375	31	–	22	.585
Oregon State ‍‍‍^{y}	9	–	15	.375	28	–	27	.509
California ‍‍‍^{y}	6	–	17	.261	31	–	24	.564
Stanford ‍‍‍	2	–	22	.083	19	–	32	.373
† – Conference champion y – Invited to the NCAA tournament As of June 30, 2017; Rankings from NFCA/USA Today

The 2017 UCLA Bruins softball team represented the University of California, Los Angeles in the 2017 NCAA Division I softball season. The Bruins were coached by Kelly Inouye-Perez, in her eleventh season as head coach. The Bruins played their home games at Easton Stadium and finished with a record of 48–15. They competed in the Pac-12 Conference, where they finished tied for third with a 16–8 record.

The Bruins were invited to the 2017 NCAA Division I softball tournament, where they won the Los Angeles Regional and Super Regional to advance to the Women's College World Series. They finished tied for fifth place with a win against Texas A&M and losses to LSU and Washington.

== Personnel ==
=== Roster ===
2017 UCLA Bruins roster
Pitchers: 00 - Rachel Garcia - (redshirt) Freshman; 15 - Johanna Grauer - Junior; 18 - Selina Ta'amilo - Junior; 48 - Bubba Nickles - Freshman; 55 - Paige McDuffee - (redshirt) Senior; - Kyla Gendler - Freshman; Catchers: 25 - Paige Halstead - Sophomore; 52 - Maddie Skibitzki - Freshman; 88 - Madeline Jelenicki - Junior	Infielders: 8 - Kylee Perez - Junior; 21 - Taylor Pack - Sophomore; 33 - Brianna Tautalafua - Sophomore; 99 - Delaney Spaulding - Senior; Outfielders: 4 - Gabrielle Maurice - Senior; 12 - Stevie Wisz - Sophomore; 13 - Imani Johnson - Sophomore; 22 - Danae Blodgett - Sophomore; 23 - Aaliyah Jordan - Freshman; 27 - Jacqui Prober - Freshman; 34 - Izzy Ordorica - Junior; 42 - Jelly Felix - (redshirt) Junior	Utility: 7 - Jenna Crawford - Freshman; 46 - Zoe Shaw - Sophomore

=== Coaches ===
2017 UCLA Bruins softball coaching staff
- Kelly Inouye-Perez - Head coach - 11th season
- Lisa Fernandez - Assistant Coach - 19th season
- Kirk Walker - Assistant Coach - 16th season

== Schedule ==
Legend
	UCLA win
	UCLA loss
*	Non-Conference game

2017 UCLA Bruins softball game log
Regular season

February
Date	Opponent	Site/stadium	Score	Overall record	Pac-12 record
Feb 10	vs South Dakota*	SDSU Softball Stadium • San Diego, CA (Stacy Winsberg Memorial Tournament)	W 6–0	1–0	
Feb 10	at San Diego State*	SDSU Softball Stadium • San Diego, CA (Stacy Winsberg Memorial Tournament)	W 8–0 ^{(6)}	2–0	
Feb 11	Weber State*	Easton Stadium • Los Angeles, CA (Stacy Winsberg Memorial Tournament)	W 4–1	3–0	
Feb 11	Weber State*	Easton Stadium • Los Angeles, CA (Stacy Winsberg Memorial Tournament)	W 22–1 ^{(5)}	4–0	
Feb 12	Notre Dame*	Easton Stadium • Los Angeles, CA (Stacy Winsberg Memorial Tournament)	W 8–0 ^{(5)}	5–0	
Feb 15	Kentucky*	Easton Stadium • Los Angeles, CA	W 6–2	6–0	
Feb 15	Kentucky*	Easton Stadium • Los Angeles, CA	L 1–2 ^{(11)}	6–1	
Feb 17	vs Cal Poly*	Big League Dreams Sports Park • Cathedral City, CA (Mary Nutter Collegiate Classic I)	W 3–1	7–1	
Feb 17	vs UCF*	Big League Dreams Sports Park • Cathedral City, CA (Mary Nutter Collegiate Classic I)	W 1–0	8–1	
Feb 19	vs UC Davis*	Big League Dreams Sports Park • Cathedral City, CA (Mary Nutter Collegiate Classic I)	W 9–1 ^{(6)}	9–1	
Feb 19	vs Liberty*	Big League Dreams Sports Park • Cathedral City, CA (Mary Nutter Collegiate Classic I)	W 7–1	10–1	
Feb 23	vs Georgia*	Big League Dreams Sports Park • Cathedral City, CA (Mary Nutter Collegiate Classic II)	W 10–5	11–1	
Feb 23	vs NC State*	Big League Dreams Sports Park • Cathedral City, CA (Mary Nutter Collegiate Classic II)	W 8–3	12–1	
Feb 24	vs Oklahoma*	Big League Dreams Sports Park • Cathedral City, CA (Mary Nutter Collegiate Classic II)	L 1–10 ^{(5)}	12–2	
Feb 25	vs LSU*	Big League Dreams Sports Park • Cathedral City, CA (Mary Nutter Collegiate Classic II)	W 6–5 ^{(8)}	13–2	
Feb 26	vs Florida State*	Big League Dreams Sports Park • Cathedral City, CA (Mary Nutter Collegiate Classic II)	L 1–2	13–3	

March
Date	Opponent	Site/stadium	Score	Overall record	Pac-12 record
Mar 2	vs Michigan*	Anderson Family Field • Fullerton, CA (Judi Garman Classic)	W 4–0	14–3	
Mar 3	vs Florida*	Anderson Family Field • Fullerton, CA (Judi Garman Classic)	L 4–9	14–4	
Mar 4	at Cal State Fullerton*	Anderson Family Field • Fullerton, CA (Judi Garman Classic)	W 2–0	15–4	
Mar 5	vs South Carolina*	Anderson Family Field • Fullerton, CA (Judi Garman Classic)	W 5–2	16–4	
Mar 5	vs Baylor*	Anderson Family Field • Fullerton, CA (Judi Garman Classic)	L 6–11	16–5	
Mar 10	vs Eastern Michigan*	LBSU Softball Complex • Long Beach, CA (Louisville Slugger Invitational)	W 8–0 ^{(5)}	17–5	
Mar 10	vs Longwood*	LBSU Softball Complex • Long Beach, CA (Louisville Slugger Invitational)	W 8–0 ^{(5)}	18–5	
Mar 11	vs Boston University*	LBSU Softball Complex • Long Beach, CA (Louisville Slugger Invitational)	W 6–1	19–5	
Mar 11	at Long Beach State*	LBSU Softball Complex • Long Beach, CA (Louisville Slugger Invitational)	W 1–0	20–5	
Mar 12	Texas*	Easton Stadium • Los Angeles, CA	W 3–2	21–5	
Mar 17	Utah	Easton Stadium • Los Angeles, CA	L 1–2	21–6	0–1
Mar 18	Utah	Easton Stadium • Los Angeles, CA	L 2–7	21–7	0–2
Mar 19	Utah	Easton Stadium • Los Angeles, CA	L 0–4	21–8	0–3
Mar 25	BYU*	Easton Stadium • Los Angeles, CA	W 1–0	22–8	
Mar 25	BYU*	Easton Stadium • Los Angeles, CA	W 4–2	23–8	
Mar 26	Dartmouth*	Easton Stadium • Los Angeles, CA	W 4–2	24–8	
Mar 31	at Washington	Husky Softball Stadium • Seattle, WA	W 6–2	25–8	1–3

April
Date	Opponent	Site/stadium	Score	Overall record	Pac-12 record
Apr 1	at Washington	Husky Softball Stadium • Seattle, WA	W 9–8	26–8	2–3
Apr 2	at Washington	Husky Softball Stadium • Seattle, WA	L 7–12	26–9	2–4
Apr 7	Oregon	Easton Stadium • Los Angeles, CA	W 2–0	27–9	3–4
Apr 8	Oregon	Easton Stadium • Los Angeles, CA	W 1–0 ^{(9)}	28–9	4–4
Apr 9	Oregon	Easton Stadium • Los Angeles, CA	L 4–11	28–10	4–5
Apr 13	at Oregon State	Oregon State Softball Complex • Corvallis, OR	L 0–8 ^{(8)}	28–11	4–6
Apr 14	at Oregon State	Oregon State Softball Complex • Corvallis, OR	W 7–5	29–11	5–6
Apr 15	at Oregon State	Oregon State Softball Complex • Corvallis, OR	L 5–8	29–12	5–7
Apr 18	Cal State Fullerton*	Easton Stadium • Los Angeles, CA	W 7–3	30–12	
Apr 21	California	Easton Stadium • Los Angeles, CA	W 3–2	31–12	6–7
Apr 22	California	Easton Stadium • Los Angeles, CA	W 3–1	32–12	7–7
Apr 23	California	Easton Stadium • Los Angeles, CA	W 8–1	33–12	8–7
Apr 26	at Cal State Northridge*	Matador Diamond • Northridge, CA	W 5–0	34–12	
Apr 28	at Stanford	Boyd & Jill Smith Family Stadium • Stanford, CA	W 13–8	35–12	9–7
Apr 29	at Stanford	Boyd & Jill Smith Family Stadium • Stanford, CA	W 6–5	36–12	10–7
Apr 30	at Stanford	Boyd & Jill Smith Family Stadium • Stanford, CA	W 8–1	37–12	11–7

May
Date	Opponent	Site/stadium	Score	Overall record	Pac-12 record
May 5	Arizona	Easton Stadium • Los Angeles, CA	W 8–0 ^{(5)}	38–12	12–7
May 6	Arizona	Easton Stadium • Los Angeles, CA	W 6–0	39–12	13–7
May 7	Arizona	Easton Stadium • Los Angeles, CA	L 2–7	39–13	13–8
May 11	at Arizona State	Alberta B. Farrington Softball Stadium • Tempe, AZ	W 4–3	40–13	14–8
May 12	at Arizona State	Alberta B. Farrington Softball Stadium • Tempe, AZ	W 13–3	41–13	15–8
May 13	at Arizona State	Alberta B. Farrington Softball Stadium • Tempe, AZ	W 12–3 ^{(5)}	42–13	16–8

Postseason

NCAA Los Angeles Regional
Date	Opponent	Seed	Site/stadium	Score	Overall record	Reg record
May 19	Lehigh	(5)	Easton Stadium • Los Angeles, CA	W 8–0 ^{(5)}	43–13	1–0
May 20	San Diego State	(5)	Easton Stadium • Los Angeles, CA	W 10–2 ^{(6)}	44–13	2–0
May 21	Cal State Fullerton	(5)	Easton Stadium • Los Angeles, CA	W 9–1	45–13	3–0

NCAA Los Angeles Super Regional
Date	Opponent	Seed	Site/stadium	Score	Overall record	SR record
May 25	Ole Miss	(5)	Easton Stadium • Los Angeles, CA	W 8–7 ^{(11)}	46–13	1–0
May 26	Ole Miss	(5)	Easton Stadium • Los Angeles, CA	W 1–0	47–13	2–0

NCAA Women's College World Series
Date	Opponent	Seed	Site/stadium	Score	Overall record	WCWS Record
June 1	(13) LSU	(5)	ASA Hall of Fame Stadium • Oklahoma City, OK	L 1–2	47–14	0–1
June 3	(9) Texas A&M	(5)	ASA Hall of Fame Stadium • Oklahoma City, OK	W 8–2	48–14	1–1
June 3	(6) Washington	(5)	ASA Hall of Fame Stadium • Oklahoma City, OK	L 0–1	48–15	1–2
