= 1993 Big East Conference softball tournament =

- Teams: 4
- Format: Single-elimination tournament
- Finals site: Connecticut Softball Stadium; Storrs, Connecticut
- Champions: Connecticut (4th title)
- Winning coach: Karen Mullins (4th title)
- MVP: Janna Venice (Connecticut)

1993 Big East Conference softball standings
	Conf.				Overall
Team	W		L	PCT	W		L	PCT
Connecticut ‍†‍‡‍^{y}	17	–	1	.944	45	–	14	.763
Providence ‍‍‍	13	–	5	.722	34	–	18	.654
Boston College ‍‍‍	7	–	9	.438	15	–	21	.417
Villanova ‍‍‍	7	–	11	.389	20	–	20	.500
St. John's ‍‍‍	7	–	13	.350	11	–	25	.306
Seton Hall ‍‍‍	3	–	15	.167	17	–	26	.395
† – Conference champion ‡ – Tournament champion y – Invited to the NCAA tournament As of June 30, 1993; Rankings from Coaches' Poll

The 1993 Big East Conference softball tournament was held at Connecticut Softball Stadium in Storrs, Connecticut. The tournament, hosted by the University of Connecticut, ran April 23 and April 24, 1993 and determined the champion for the Big East Conference for the 1993 NCAA Division I softball season. Top-seeded Connecticut won the tournament for the fourth time and earned the Big East Conference's automatic bid to the 1993 NCAA Division I softball tournament.

== Format and seeding ==
The top four teams from the conference's round-robin regular season qualified for the tournament, and were seeded one through four. They played a double-elimination tournament.

Team	W	L	Pct.	GB	Seed
Connecticut	17	1	.944	—	1
Providence	13	5	.722	4	2
Boston College	7	9	.438	9	3
Villanova	7	11	.389	10	4
St. John's	7	13	.350	11	—
Seton Hall	3	15	.167	14	—

== Tournament ==
First Round
1	Connecticut	2^{12}
4	Villanova	1
3	Boston College	3
2	Providence	4^{9}
Lower round 1
4	Villanova	1
3	Boston College	0

Semi-Finals
1	Connecticut	7
2	Providence	1
Lower final
2	Providence	0
4	Villanova	1

Finals
1	Connecticut	9	—
4	Villanova	0	—

== Most Outstanding Player ==
Janna Venice was named Tournament Most Outstanding Player. Venice was an outfielder for Connecticut.
