= Kenny Gajewski =

American softball coach

Current position
- Title: Head coach
- Team: Oklahoma State
- Conference: Big 12
- Record: 441–186 (.703)

Biographical details
- Born: October 23, 1971 (age 55); Los Alamitos, California, U.S.
- Education: Oklahoma (Class of 1994)

Playing career
- 1991: Cerritos College
- 1992–1993: Cal State Dominguez Hills
- 1994: Oklahoma

Coaching career (HC unless noted)
- 1995: Oklahoma (Graduate asst.)
- 1996: Kansas State (Volunteer asst.)
- 2013–2015: Florida (asst.)
- 2016–present: Oklahoma State

Administrative career (AD unless noted)
- 1997–2006: Oklahoma (Turf/Maintenance Dir.)
- 2011–2012: Tennessee (Dir. of Baseball Operations)

Head coaching record
- Overall: 441–186 (.703)
- Tournaments: NCAA: 33–18 (.647)

Accomplishments and honors

Championships
- As a player: College World Series (1994); As an assistant coach: 2× Women's College World Series (2014, 2015)

Awards
- NFCA Midwest Regional Coaching Staff of the Year (2019)

Kenny Gajewski (born October 23, 1971) is an American softball coach who is the current head coach at Oklahoma State.

== Early life and education ==
Gajewski graduated from the University of Oklahoma. He played baseball for the 1994 Oklahoma baseball team that won the national championship.

== Coaching career ==
=== Florida (asst.) ===
On July 13, 2012, Florida added Gajewski to the softball staff as an assistant coach under head coach Tim Walton.

=== Oklahoma State ===
On July 13, 2015, Kenny Gajewski was announced as the new head coach of the Oklahoma State softball program.

== Head coaching record ==
=== College ===
Record table
Season	Team	Overall	Conference	Standing	Postseason
Oklahoma State Cowgirls (Big 12 Conference) (2016–Present)
2016	Oklahoma State	32–26	6–11	5th	NCAA Athens Regional
2017	Oklahoma State	38–25	12–6	3rd	NCAA Gainesville Regional
2018	Oklahoma State	39–22	12–6	T-2nd	NCAA Fayetteville Regional
2019	Oklahoma State	45–17	13–5	2nd	Women's College World Series
2020	Oklahoma State	19–5	0–0		Season canceled due to COVID-19
2021	Oklahoma State	48–12	15–3	2nd	Women's College World Series
2022	Oklahoma State	48–14	14–4	2nd	Women's College World Series
2023	Oklahoma State	47–16	10–8	3rd	Women's College World Series
2024	Oklahoma State	49–12	21–6	3rd	Women's College World Series
2025	Oklahoma State	35-20	13-9	4th	NCAA Fayetteville Regional
2026	Oklahoma State	41-17	16-8	T-2nd	
Oklahoma State:		441–186 (.703)	131–66 (.665)		
Total:		441–186 (.703)			
National champion Postseason invitational champion Conference regular season champion Conference regular season and conference tournament champion Division regular season champion Division regular season and conference tournament champion Conference tournament champion
