= Taylor Lynch =

American softball player

Personal information
- Born: 1997 (age 28–29) Plano, Texas, U.S.
- Height: 5 ft 3 in (1.60 m)

Sport
- Country: USA
- Sport: Softball
- College team: Oklahoma State Cowgirls

Taylor Lee Lynch (born 1997) is an American softball player. She attended Red Oak High School in Red Oak, Texas. She later attended Oklahoma State University–Stillwater, where she played on the Oklahoma State Cowgirls softball team. In her senior year, Lynch played the entire season with a torn ACL in her right knee, while she led the Cowgirls to a berth in the 2019 Women's College World Series second round, where they lost to Washington, 1–0.
