= 1982 UCLA Bruins softball team =

American college softball season

1982 UCLA Bruins softball

National Champion NCAA Central Regional champion
- Conference: Western Collegiate Athletic Association
- Record: 33–7–2 (15–4–1 WCAA)
- Head coach: Sharron Backus (8th season)
- Home stadium: Sunset Field

1982 Western Collegiate Athletic Association softball standings
	Conf.						Overall
Team	W		L		T	PCT	W		L		T	PCT
Cal State Fullerton ^{†y} ‍‍‍	17	–	3	–	0	.850	55	–	6	–	2	.889
UCLA ‍‍‍^{y}	15	–	4	–	1	.775	33	–	7	–	2	.810
Arizona State ‍‍‍^{y}	11	–	9	–	0	.550	34	–	18	–	0	.654
Arizona ‍‍‍	6	–	14	–	0	.300	14	–	17	–	0	.452
San Diego State ‍‍‍	6	–	14	–	0	.300	15	–	22	–	0	.405
Long Beach State ‍‍‍	3	–	17	–	0	.150	18	–	36	–	0	.333
† – Conference champion y – Invited to the NCAA tournament

The 1982 UCLA Bruins softball team represented the University of California, Los Angeles in the 1982 college softball season. The Bruins were coached by Sharron Backus, who led her eighth season. The Bruins played their home games at Sunset Field and finished with a record of 33–7–2. They competed in the Western Collegiate Athletic Association, where they finished second with a 15–4–1 record.

The Bruins were invited to the 1982 NCAA Division I softball tournament, where they swept the Central Regional and then completed an undefeated run through the Women's College World Series to claim the first NCAA Women's College World Series Championship. The Bruins had earlier claimed an AIAW title in 1978.

== Personnel ==
=== Roster ===
1982 UCLA Bruins roster
Pitchers: 3 – Tracy Compton – freshman; 6 – Karen Andrews – senior; 11 – Lori Warkentin – junior; 17 - Debbie Doom – freshman; Catchers: 4 – Michelle Aguilar – junior; 19 – Barbara Booth – junior	Infielders: 1 - Dot Richardson – junior; 7 – Sue Eskiersi – junior; 13 – Stacy Winsberg – freshman; 15 – Debbie Hauer – senior; 16 – Sheila Cornell – sophomore	Outfielders: 2 – Gina Vecchione – senior; 8 – Barbara Young – sophomore; 9 – Karen Owens – senior; 12 – Leslie Rover – freshman

=== Coaches ===
1982 UCLA Bruins softball coaching staff
- Sharron Backus - 8th season
- Sue Enquist - 3rd season

== Schedule ==
Legend
	UCLA win
	UCLA loss
	Tie
*	Non-Conference game

1982 UCLA Bruins softball game log
Regular season

February/March
Date	Opponent	Site/stadium	Score	Overall record	WCAA Record
February 23	Cal State Northridge*	Sunset Field • Los Angeles, CA	L 0–1	0–1	
February 23	Cal State Northridge*	Sunset Field • Los Angeles, CA	W 3–0	1–1	
March 6	San Diego State	Sunset Field • Los Angeles, CA	W 4–0	2–1	1–0
March 6	San Diego State	Sunset Field • Los Angeles, CA	W 2–1	3–1	2–0
March 8	Creighton*	Sunset Field • Los Angeles, CA	L 2–3	3–2	
March 8	Creighton*	Sunset Field • Los Angeles, CA	W 1–0	4–2	
March 9	Cal Poly Pomona*	Sunset Field • Los Angeles, CA	L 1–2^{9}	4–3	
March 9	Cal Poly Pomona*	Sunset Field • Los Angeles, CA	W 1–0^{13}	5–3	
March 12	at Arizona	Tucson, AZ	W 2–0^{14}	6–3	3–0
March 12	at Arizona	Tucson, AZ	W 5–0	7–3	4–0
March 13	at Arizona State	Tempe, AZ	W 1–0^{14}	8–3	5–0
March 13	at Arizona State	Tempe, AZ	W 1–0	9–3	6–0
March 24	Weber State*	Sunset Field • Los Angeles, CA	W 1–0	10–3	
March 24	Weber State*	Sunset Field • Los Angeles, CA	W 1–0	11–3	
March 31	California*	Sunset Field • Los Angeles, CA	W 3–0	12–3	

April
Date	Opponent	Site/stadium	Score	Overall record	WCAA Record
April 8	Long Beach State	Sunset Field • Los Angeles, CA	W 2–0	13–3	7–0
April 8	Long Beach State	Sunset Field • Los Angeles, CA	W 4–0	14–3	8–0
April 14	at San Diego State	San Diego, CA	W 1–0	15–3	9–0
April 14	at San Diego State	San Diego, CA	W 3–0	16–3	10–0
April 16	US International*	Sunset Field • Los Angeles, CA	W 2–0	17–3	
April 16	US International*	Sunset Field • Los Angeles, CA	W 1–0	18–3	
April 20	Cal State Fullerton	Sunset Field • Los Angeles, CA	L 1–3	18–4	10–1
April 20	Cal State Fulerton	Sunset Field • Los Angeles, CA	T 0–0^{17}	18–4–1	10–1–1
April 23	Arizona State	Sunset Field • Los Angeles, CA	W 1–0	19–4–1	11–1–1
April 23	Arizona State	Sunset Field • Los Angeles, CA	W 1–0^{8}	20–4–1	12–1–1
April 24	Arizona	Sunset Field • Los Angeles, CA	L 1–2	20–5–1	12–2–1
April 24	Arizona	Sunset Field • Los Angeles, CA	W 1–0	21–5–1	13–2–1
April 28	at Cal State Fullerton	Lions Field • Fullerton, CA	L 1–2^{17}	21–6–1	13–3–1
April 28	at Cal State Fullerton	Lions Field • Fullerton, CA	L 0–1	21–7–1	13–4–1
April 30	at Long Beach State	Long Beach, CA	W 4–0	22–7–1	14–4–1
April 30	at Long Beach State	Long Beach, CA	W 6–1	23–7–1	15–4–1

May
Date	Opponent	Site/stadium	Score	Overall record	WCAA Record
May 3	at Cal Poly Pomona*	Pomona, CA	W 2–0	24–7–1	
May 3	at Cal Poly Pomona*	Pomona, CA	T 0–0^{18}	24–7–2	
May 5	UC Santa Barbara	Sunset Field • Los Angeles, CA	W 3–0	25–7–2	
May 5	UC Santa Barbara	Sunset Field • Los Angeles, CA	W 6–1	26–7–2	

Postseason

NCAA Central Regional
Date	Opponent	Site/stadium	Score	Overall record	NCAAT record
May 14	Wyoming	Mayfair Park • Lakewood, CA	W 4–0	27–7–2	1–0
May 15	Wyoming	Mayfair Park • Lakewood, CA	W 5–0	28–7–2	2–0

NCAA Women's College World Series
Date	Opponent	Site/stadium	Score	Overall record	WCWS Record
May 27	Oklahoma State	Seymour Smith Park • Omaha, NE	W 2–1^{13}	29–7–2	1–0
May 29	Western Michigan	Seymour Smith Park • Omaha, NE	W 1–0	30–7–2	2–0
May 29	Arizona State	Seymour Smith Park • Omaha, NE	W 1–0	31–7–2	3–0
May 30	Cal State Fullerton	Seymour Smith Park • Omaha, NE	W 1–0^{10}	32–7–2	4–0
May 31	Fresno State	Seymour Smith Park • Omaha, NE	W 2–0^{8}	33–7–2	5–0
