= 1982 Fresno State Bulldogs softball team =

American college softball season

1982 Fresno State Bulldogs softball

NCAA Northwest Regional champion NCAC champion

Women's College World Series, runner-up
- Conference: Northern California Athletic Conference
- Record: 43–11 (17–3 NCAC)
- Head coach: Donna Pickel (5th season)

The 1982 Fresno State Bulldogs softball team represented California State University, Fresno in the 1982 NCAA Division I softball season. The Bulldogs were coached by Donna Pickel, who led her fifth season. The Bulldogs finished with a record of 43–11. They competed in the Northern California Athletic Conference, where they finished first with a 17–3 record.

The Bulldogs were invited to the 1982 NCAA Division I Softball Tournament, where they swept the Northwest Regional and then completed a run to the title game of the Women's College World Series where they fell to champion UCLA.

== Roster ==
1982 Fresno State Bulldogs roster
Pitchers: 42 - Barbara Cambria; 38 - Ella Vilche; 19 - Wende Ward; Catchers: 15 - Mickie Anacleto; 25 - Denise Fabris; 40 - Denise Ketcham; 35 - Sandra Taylor; 20 - Shell Voorhees	Infielders: 5 - Debbie Camacho; 28 - Edna Figueroa; 3 - Roberta Garcia; 7 - Kim Muratore; 41 - Rene Polanco; 30 - Rhonda Williams	Outfielders: 44 - Caroline Mullin; 10 - Alyce Rodriguez

== Schedule ==
Legend
	Fresno State win
	Fresno State loss
*	Non-Conference game

1982 Fresno State Bulldogs softball game log
Regular season

Date	Opponent	Site/stadium	Score	Overall record
	USC	Bulldog Diamond • Fresno, CA	W 7–0	1–0
	USC	Bulldog Diamond • Fresno, CA	W 9–0	2–0
	Cal State Northridge	Bulldog Diamond • Fresno, CA	W 4–0	3–0
	Cal State Northridge	Bulldog Diamond • Fresno, CA	W 2–0	4–0
	at Stanford	Stanford, CA	W 6–3	5–0
	at Stanford	Stanford, CA	W 5–0	6–0
	at Santa Clara	Santa Clara, CA	W 9–0	7–0
	at Santa Clara	Santa Clara, CA	W 13–1	8–0
	vs Pacific		W 2–1	9–0
	at Sacramento State	Sacramento, CA	W 9–0	10–0
	at Sacramento State	Sacramento, CA	W 7–4	11–0
	US International	Bulldog Diamond • Fresno, CA	W 2–1	12–0
	US International	Bulldog Diamond • Fresno, CA	W 4–0	13–0
	Stanislaus State	Bulldog Diamond • Fresno, CA	W 14–0	14–0
	Stanislaus State	Bulldog Diamond • Fresno, CA	W 10–0	15–0
	Santa Clara	Bulldog Diamond • Fresno, CA	W 18–0	16–0
	Santa Clara	Bulldog Diamond • Fresno, CA	W 11–0	17–0
	vs Arizona		L 0–1	17–1
	vs Texas A&M		L 1–3	17–2
	vs Cal State Dominguez Hills		W 3–2	18–2
	vs UC Santa Barbara		L 0–2	18–3
	vs San Francisco		L 0–2	18–4
	UC Santa Barbara	Bulldog Diamond • Fresno, CA	W 1–0	19–4
	UC Santa Barbara	Bulldog Diamond • Fresno, CA	W 3–1	20–4
	vs Cal State Dominguez Hills		W 4–3	21–4
	vs UNLV		W 12–0	22–4
	vs UNLV		W 16–6	23–4
	vs California		W 3–1	24–4
	vs Cal State Northridge		W 7–5	25–4
	at Cal Poly	San Luis Obispo, CA	W 4–0	26–4
	at Cal Poly	San Luis Obispo, CA	L 1–3	26–5
	San Francisco State	Bulldog Diamond • Fresno, CA	W 4–0	27–5
	San Francisco State	Bulldog Diamond • Fresno, CA	W 4–0	28–5
	Stanford	Bulldog Diamond • Fresno, CA	W 11–0	29–5
	Stanford	Bulldog Diamond • Fresno, CA	W 7–1	30–5
	at California	Berkeley, CA	W 1–0	31–5
	at California	Berkeley, CA	W 6–0	32–5
	at Pacific		L 0–1	32–6
	at Pacific		L 4–5	32–7
	at San Francisco	San Francisco, CA	W 4–2	33–7
	at San Francisco	San Francisco, CA	W 4–0	34–7
	California	Bulldog Diamond • Fresno, CA	L 0–1	34–8
	California	Bulldog Diamond • Fresno, CA	W 2–1	35–8
	at San Francisco	San Francisco, CA	W 4–2	36–8
	at San Francisco	San Francisco, CA	W 4–0	37–8
	Pacific	Bulldog Diamond • Fresno, CA	W 3–1	38–8

Postseason

NCAA Northwest Regional
Date	Opponent	Site/stadium	Score	Overall record	NCAAT record
	Pacific	Bulldog Diamond • Fresno, CA	W 2–0	39–8	1–0
	Pacific	Bulldog Diamond • Fresno, CA	L 1–5	39–9	1–1
	Pacific	Bulldog Diamond • Fresno, CA	W 4–0	40–9	2–1

NCAA Women's College World Series
Date	Opponent	Site/stadium	Score	Overall record	WCWS Record
May 27	Western Michigan	Seymour Smith Park • Omaha, NE	L 0–5	40–10	0–1
May 29	Oklahoma State	Seymour Smith Park • Omaha, NE	W 1–0	41–10	1–1
May 29	Nebraska	Seymour Smith Park • Omaha, NE	W 1–0	42–10	2–1
May 30	Arizona State	Seymour Smith Park • Omaha, NE	W 4–1	43–10	3–1
May 31	UCLA	Seymour Smith Park • Omaha, NE	L 0–2	43–11	3–2
