= 1993 Connecticut Huskies softball team =

American college softball season

1993 Connecticut Huskies softball

Big East Conference champion Big East tournament champion NCAA Regional champion

Women's College World Series, 1–2
- Conference: Big East Conference (1979–2013)
- Record: 45–14 (17–1 Big East)
- Head coach: Karen Mullins (10th season)
- Home stadium: Connecticut Softball Stadium

1993 Big East Conference softball standings
	Conf.				Overall
Team	W		L	PCT	W		L	PCT
Connecticut ‍†‍‡‍^{y}	17	–	1	.944	45	–	14	.763
Providence ‍‍‍	13	–	5	.722	34	–	18	.654
Boston College ‍‍‍	7	–	9	.438	15	–	21	.417
Villanova ‍‍‍	7	–	11	.389	20	–	20	.500
St. John's ‍‍‍	7	–	13	.350	11	–	25	.306
Seton Hall ‍‍‍	3	–	15	.167	17	–	26	.395
† – Conference champion ‡ – Tournament champion y – Invited to the NCAA tournament

The 1993 Connecticut Huskies softball team represented the University of Connecticut in the 1993 NCAA Division I softball season. The Huskies were led by Karen Mullins in her 10th year as head coach, and played as part of the Big East Conference. Connecticut posted a 45–14 record (17–1 in conference) and earned an invitation to the 1993 NCAA Division I softball tournament. They won their regional with victories over Hofstra and UNLV to earn a berth in the Women's College World Series, their first appearance in the ultimate college softball event. The Huskies lost their first game against eventual runner-up UCLA, defeated Florida State and were eliminated by eventual third-place finisher Southwestern Louisiana.

== Roster ==
1993 Connecticut Huskies roster
- Dina Adams; - Heather Baehre; - Wendy Farrar; - Tricia Fiut; - Kathy Flores; - Tabitha Lyons; - Ericka Nole; - Joanne Smith; - Kimberly Staehle; - Chris Woodman	Pitchers: - Kara Chanasyk; 23 – Pat Conlan	Catchers: - Khristen Andrade; Infielders: - Shari Blackman; - Donna Fagan; - Chris Wajda; Outfielders: - Andrea D'Innocenzo; 16 – Janna Venice

== Schedule ==
1993 Connecticut Huskies Softball Game Log
Regular season

March
Date	Opponent	Site/stadium	Score	Overall record	BE Record
Mar 12	vs Miami (OH)*	USF Softball Field • Tampa, FL	W 7–3	1–0	
Mar 12	vs Notre Dame*	USF Softball Field • Tampa, FL	L 2–3	1–1	
Mar 13	vs Temple*	USF Softball Field • Tampa, FL	W 11–1	2–1	
Mar 14	vs North Carolina*	USF Softball Field • Tampa, FL	W 3–0	3–1	
Mar 14	vs Sam Houston State*	USF Softball Field • Tampa, FL	L 3–1	3–2	
Mar 16	at Florida State*	Tallahassee, FL	L 0–1^{8}	3–3	
Mar 16	at Florida State*	Tallahassee, FL	L 0–8	3–4	
Mar 19	vs Rider*	Tallahassee, FL	W 4–1	4–4	
Mar 19	vs Northern Iowa*	Tallahassee, FL	W 7–0	5–4	
Mar 19	vs Northeast Louisiana*	Tallahassee, FL	W 2–0	6–4	
Mar 20	vs Furman*	Tallahassee, FL	W 4–1	7–4	
Mar 20	vs Kent State*	Tallahassee, FL	L 0–2	7–5	
Mar 20	vs Nicholls State*	Tallahassee, FL	L 0–4	7–6	
Mar 27	vs Rutgers*	Philadelphia, PA	W 2–1^{8}	9–6	
Mar 27	vs Rutgers*	Philadelphia, PA	W 7–3	9–6	
Mar 28	at Temple*	Philadelphia, PA	L 0–1^{8}	9–7	
Mar 28	at Temple*	Philadelphia, PA	W 10–5	10–7	
Mar 30	at Providence	Providence, RI	W 1–0	11–7	1–0
Mar 30	at Providence	Providence, RI	W 6–1	12–7	2–0
Mar 31	Boston College	Connecticut Softball Stadium • Storrs, CT	W 2–0	13–7	3–0
Mar 31	Boston College	Connecticut Softball Stadium • Storrs, CT	W 6–1	14–7	4–0

April
Date	Opponent	Site/stadium	Score	Overall record	BE Record
Apr 3	Seton Hall	Connecticut Softball Stadium • Storrs, CT	W 11–1	15–7	5–0
Apr 3	Seton Hall	Connecticut Softball Stadium • Storrs, CT	W 10–5	16–7	6–0
Apr 4	Villanova	Connecticut Softball Stadium • Storrs, CT	W 3–0	17–7	7–0
Apr 4	Villanova	Connecticut Softball Stadium • Storrs, CT	W 8–1	18–7	8–0
Apr 5	St. John's	Connecticut Softball Stadium • Storrs, CT	W 5–2	19–7	9–0
Apr 5	St. John's	Connecticut Softball Stadium • Storrs, CT	W 2–0	20–7	10–0
Apr 8	UMass*	Connecticut Softball Stadium • Storrs, CT	W 4–0	21–7	
Apr 8	UMass*	Connecticut Softball Stadium • Storrs, CT	W 2–0	22–7	
Apr 13	Providence	Connecticut Softball Stadium • Storrs, CT	W 3–0	23–7	11–0
Apr 13	Providence	Connecticut Softball Stadium • Storrs, CT	L 0–1	23–8	11–1
Apr 14	at Boston College	Chestnut Hill, MA	W 9–0	24–8	12–1
Apr 14	at Boston College	Chestnut Hill, MA	W 12–0	25–8	13–1
Apr 17	at Seton Hall	South Orange, NJ	W 6–0	26–8	14–1
Apr 17	at Seton Hall	South Orange, NJ	W 5–2	27–8	15–1
Apr 18	at St. John's	Jamaica, NY	W 12–0	28–8	16–1
Apr 18	at St. John's	Jamaica, NY	W 10–0	29–8	17–1

Postseason

Big East Tournament
Date	Opponent	Site/stadium	Score	Overall record	BET Record
Apr 24	(4) Villanova	Connecticut Softball Stadium • Storrs, CT	W 2–1	30–8	1–0
Apr 24	(2) Providence	Connecticut Softball Stadium • Storrs, CT	W 7–1	31–8	2–0
Apr 25	(4) Villanova	Connecticut Softball Stadium • Storrs, CT	W 9–0	32–8	3–0

April
Date	Opponent	Site/stadium	Score	Overall record
Apr 27	Adelphi	Connecticut Softball Stadium • Storrs, CT	W 6–1	33–7
Apr 27	Adelphi	Connecticut Softball Stadium • Storrs, CT	W 6–2	34–8
Apr 29	at Central Connecticut	New Britain, CT	W 9–1	35–8
Apr 29	at Central Connecticut	New Britain, CT	W 2–0	36–8

May
Date	Opponent	Site/stadium	Score	Overall record
May 1	vs Florida State	Amherst, MA	W 4–1	37–8
May 1	at UMass	Amherst, MA	W 2–0	38–8
May 2	vs South Florida	Amherst, MA	W 2–1^{8}	39–8
May 3	at UMass	Amherst, MA	W 1–0 (Note: Pat Conlon threw a no-hitter.)	40–8
May 3	at UMass	Amherst, MA	W 2–1	41–8
May 5	at Hofstra	Hempstead, NY	L 1–2	41–9
May 8	Princeton	Connecticut Softball Stadium • Storrs, CT	L 0–1	41–10
May 8	Princeton	Connecticut Softball Stadium • Storrs, CT	L 2–4	41–11

NCAA Regional
Date	Opponent	Site/stadium	Score	Overall record	NCAAT record
May 22	UNLV	Hempstead, NY	L 1–2	41–12	0–1
May 22	Hofstra	Hempstead, NY	W 2–1	42–12	1–1
May 23	UNLV	Hempstead, NY	W 2–0	43–12	2–1
May 23	UNLV	Hempstead, NY	W 2–0	44–12	3–1

Women's College World Series
Date	Opponent	Site/stadium	Score	Overall record	WCWS Record
May 27	(1) UCLA	ASA Hall of Fame Stadium • Oklahoma City, OK	L 0–3	44–13	0–1
May 29	(5) Florida State	ASA Hall of Fame Stadium • Oklahoma City, OK	W 2–1^{8}	45–13	1–1
May 30	(7) Southwestern Louisiana	ASA Hall of Fame Stadium • Oklahoma City, OK	L 0–1	45–14	1–2
