= 1993 NCAA Division I softball season =

American college softball season

- Defending Champions: UCLA

Tournament

Women's College World Series
- Duration: May 27–31, 1993
- Champions: Arizona (2nd title)
- Runners-up: UCLA (11th WCWS Appearance)
- Winning Coach: Mike Candrea (2nd title)

Seasons
- ← 1992 1994 →

The 1993 NCAA Division I softball season, play of college softball in the United States organized by the National Collegiate Athletic Association (NCAA) at the Division I level, began in February 1993. The season progressed through the regular season, many conference tournaments and championship series, and concluded with the 1993 NCAA Division I softball tournament and 1993 Women's College World Series. The Women's College World Series, consisting of the eight remaining teams in the NCAA Tournament and held in Oklahoma City at ASA Hall of Fame Stadium, ended on May 31, 1993.

== Conference standings ==
1993 Big East Conference softball standings
	Conf.				Overall
Team	W		L	PCT	W		L	PCT
Connecticut ‍†‍‡‍^{y}	17	–	1	.944	45	–	14	.763
Providence ‍‍‍	13	–	5	.722	34	–	18	.654
Boston College ‍‍‍	7	–	9	.438	15	–	21	.417
Villanova ‍‍‍	7	–	11	.389	20	–	20	.500
St. John's ‍‍‍	7	–	13	.350	11	–	25	.306
Seton Hall ‍‍‍	3	–	15	.167	17	–	26	.395
† – Conference champion ‡ – Tournament champion y – Invited to the NCAA tournament

1993 Big Ten Conference softball standings
	Conf.						Overall
Team	W		L		T	PCT	W		L		T	PCT
Michigan ‍†‍‍^{y}	21	–	5	–	0	.808	34	–	26	–	0	.567
Iowa ‍‍‍	20	–	7	–	0	.741	39	–	15	–	0	.722
Minnesota ‍‍‍	16	–	9	–	0	.640	32	–	24	–	0	.571
Northwestern ‍‍‍	17	–	11	–	0	.607	34	–	25	–	0	.576
Ohio State ‍‍‍	16	–	12	–	0	.571	31	–	25	–	0	.554
Indiana ‍‍‍	11	–	17	–	0	.393	28	–	23	–	1	.548
Penn State ‍‍‍	4	–	24	–	0	.143	14	–	34	–	0	.292
Michigan State ‍‍‍	4	–	24	–	0	.143	11	–	38	–	0	.224
† – Conference champion y – Invited to the NCAA tournament

1993 Pacific-10 Conference softball standings
	Conf.				Overall
Team	W		L	PCT	W		L	PCT
UCLA ‍†‍‍^{y}	25	–	1	.962	50	–	5	.909
Arizona ‍‍‍^{y}	15	–	3	.833	44	–	8	.846
Arizona State ‍‍‍^{y}	13	–	11	.542	34	–	26	.567
California ‍‍‍^{y}	12	–	10	.545	37	–	20	.649
Oregon ‍‍‍	8	–	8	.500	18	–	16	.529
Oregon State ‍‍‍	6	–	13	.316	13	–	19	.406
Washington ‍‍‍	7	–	18	.280	31	–	27	.534
Stanford ‍‍‍	0	–	22	.000	1	–	41	.024
† – Conference champion y – Invited to the NCAA tournament

1993 Southland Conference softball standings
	Conf.						Overall
Team	W		L		T	PCT	W		L		T	PCT
Sam Houston State ‍†‍‍	24	–	4	–	0	.857	39	–	15	–	0	.722
Texas–Arlington ‍‍‍	18	–	6	–	0	.750	36	–	23	–	0	.610
Nicholls State ‍‍‍	15	–	6	–	1	.705	32	–	14	–	2	.688
McNeese State ‍‍‍	12	–	12	–	1	.500	23	–	28	–	1	.452
Texas–San Antonio ‍‍‍	10	–	16	–	0	.385	21	–	23	–	0	.477
Northwestern Louisiana ‍‍‍	7	–	19	–	0	.269	25	–	28	–	0	.472
Southwest Texas State ‍‍‍	7	–	23	–	0	.233	13	–	32	–	0	.289
Northeast Louisiana* ‍‍‍	9	–	12	–	0	.429	14	–	30	–	1	.322
Stephen F. Austin* ‍‍‍	8	–	12	–	0	.400	9	–	26	–	0	.257
† – Conference champion y – Invited to the NCAA tournament * Northeast Louisiana and Stephen F. Austin not eligible for regular season championship. They did not play the minimum number of conference games required.

== Women's College World Series ==
The 1993 NCAA Women's College World Series took place from May 28 to May 31, 1993 in Oklahoma City.

Upper round 1
1	UCLA	3
8	Connecticut	0
4	Oklahoma State	5
5	Florida State	2
3	Arizona	6
6	Long Beach State	0
2	Cal State Northridge	2
7	Southwestern Louisiana	4

Upper round 2
1	UCLA	0
4	Oklahoma State	1^{13}
3	Arizona	2
7	Southwestern Louisiana	1
Lower round 1
8	Connecticut	2^{8}
5	Florida State	1
6	Long Beach State	2
2	Cal State Northridge	4

Upper final
4	Oklahoma State	0
3	Arizona	1^{9}
Lower round 2
7	Southwestern Louisiana	1
8	Connecticut	0
1	UCLA	2
2	Cal State Northridge	0

Semifinals
3	Arizona	0
7	Southwestern Louisiana	1
4	Oklahoma State	0
1	UCLA	5

Preliminary final
7	Southwestern Louisiana	0
1	UCLA	1

Final
1	UCLA	0
3	Arizona	1

== Season leaders ==
Batting

- Batting average: .521 – La'Tosha Williams, Delaware State Hornets
- RBIs: 66 – Marcelina Smith, Florida A&M Lady Rattlers
- Home runs: 19 – Marcelina Smith, Florida A&M Lady Rattlers

Pitching

- Wins: 33-3 & 33-11 – Lisa Fernandez, UCLA Bruins & Kim Gonzalez, Texas A&M Aggies
- ERA: 0.25 (9 ER/249.2 IP) – Lisa Fernandez, UCLA Bruins
- Strikeouts: 484 – Michele Granger, California Golden Bears

== Records ==
NCAA Division I season no-hitters: 9 – Michele Granger, California Golden Bears

NCAA Division I season consecutive games hit streak: 42 – Cathy Frohnheiser, Furman Paladins; March 4-April 17, 1993

Senior class single game triples: 3 – Karrie Irvin, Southern Illinois Salukis; April 24, 1993

Senior class single game strikeouts: 26 – Michele Granger, California Golden Bears; March 20, 1993

Freshman class batting average: .521 – La'Tosha Williams, Delaware State Hornets

Freshman class perfect games: 3 – Terri Kobata, Notre Dame Fighting Irish

Sophomore class batting average: .583 – Andrea Mollohan, Delaware State Hornets

Junior class stolen bases: 73 – Michelle Ward, East Carolina Pirates

== Awards ==
- Honda Sports Award Collegiate Woman Athlete of The Year:

Lisa Fernandez, UCLA Bruins

- Honda Sports Award Softball:

Lisa Fernandez, UCLA Bruins

YEAR	W	L	GP	GS	CG	SHO	SV	IP	H	R	ER	BB	SO	ERA	WHIP
1993	33	3	36	33	33	28	0	249.2	80	10	9	46	348	0.25	0.50

YEAR	G	AB	R	H	BA	RBI	HR	3B	2B	TB	SLG	BB	SO	SB	SBA
1993	54	157	43	80	.509	45	11	2	12	129	.821%	35	3	0	0

== All America Teams ==
The following players were members of the All-American Teams.

First Team

Position	Player	Class	School
P	Susie Parra	JR.	Arizona Wildcats
P	Melanie Roche	JR.	Oklahoma State Cowgirls
P	Michele Granger	SR.	California Golden Bears
C	Gillian Boxx	SO.	California Golden Bears
1B	Cyndi Parus	SO.	UNLV Rebels
2B	Lisa Davidson	JR.	FSU Seminoles
3B	Cathy Frohnheiser	JR.	Furman Paladins
SS	Jennifer McFalls	JR.	Texas A&M Aggies
OF	Patti Benedict	SR.	Michigan Wolverines
OF	Beth Calcante	JR.	CSUN Matadors
OF	Jamie Heggen	SR.	Arizona Wildcats
UT	Lisa Fernandez	SR.	UCLA Bruins

Second Team

Position	Player	Class	School
P	Patricia Conlan	SR.	Connecticut Huskies
P	Karen Jackson	JR.	Iowa Hawkeyes
P	Tami Blunt	FR.	Sacramento State Hornets
C	Jody Miller-Pruitt	SR.	Arizona Wildcats
1B	Amy Chellevold	SO.	Arizona Wildcats
2B	Kelly Howard	FR.	UCLA Bruins
3B	Lynn Britton	FR.	ULL Rajin' Cajuns
SS	Laura Espinoza	SO.	Arizona Wildcats
OF	Jennifer Brewster	SO.	UCLA Bruins
OF	Keri Kropke	SR.	California Golden Bears
OF	Susan Buttery	JR.	FSU Seminoles
DP	Kathy Beasley	FR.	Utah State Aggies
UT	Janna Venice	SR.	Connecticut Huskies
AT-L	Crystal Boyd	JR.	Hofstra Pride

Third Team

Position	Player	Class	School
P	Kathy Blake	SO.	CSUN Matadors
P	Marla Looper	JR.	FSU Seminoles
P	DeAnna Earsley	SR.	Utah State Aggies
C	Sherri Kuchinskas	SR.	UMass Minutewomen
1B	Niki VanHooreweghe	SO.	Northern Illinois Huskies
2B	Tricia Reimche	SR.	UNLV Rebels
3B	Barb Gaines	SR.	Southwest Missouri State Bears
SS	Tiffany Tootle	SR.	South Carolina Gamecocks
OF	Andrea D'Innocenzo	SO.	Connecticut Huskies
OF	K. K. McCoy	JR.	Oklahoma State Cowgirls
OF	Anne Carpenter	JR.	Northwestern Wildcats
DP	Katy Morgan	FR.	Iowa Hawkeyes
UT	Krinon Clark	JR.	Ohio State Buckeyes
AT-L	Denise DeWalt	SR.	Cal State Fullerton Titans
