= 1993 UCLA Bruins softball team =

American college softball season

1993 UCLA Bruins softball

Pac-10 champion NCAA Northwest Regional champion

Women's College World Series, runner-up
- Conference: Pacific-10 Conference
- Record: 50–5 (25–1 Pac-10)
- Head coach: Sharron Backus (19th season) & Sue Enquist (5th season)
- Home stadium: Sunset Field

1993 Pacific-10 Conference softball standings
	Conf.				Overall
Team	W		L	PCT	W		L	PCT
UCLA ‍†‍‍^{y}	25	–	1	.962	50	–	5	.909
Arizona ‍‍‍^{y}	15	–	3	.833	44	–	8	.846
Arizona State ‍‍‍^{y}	13	–	11	.542	34	–	26	.567
California ‍‍‍^{y}	12	–	10	.545	37	–	20	.649
Oregon ‍‍‍	8	–	8	.500	18	–	16	.529
Oregon State ‍‍‍	6	–	13	.316	13	–	19	.406
Washington ‍‍‍	7	–	18	.280	31	–	27	.534
Stanford ‍‍‍	0	–	22	.000	1	–	41	.024
† – Conference champion y – Invited to the NCAA tournament

The 1993 UCLA Bruins softball team represented the University of California, Los Angeles in the 1993 NCAA Division I softball season. The Bruins were coached by Sharron Backus, who led her nineteenth season and Sue Enquist, in her fifth season, in an uncommonly used co-head coach system. The Bruins played their home games at Sunset Field and finished with a record of 50–5. They competed in the Pacific-10 Conference, where they finished first with a 25–1 record.

The Bruins were invited to the 1993 NCAA Division I softball tournament, where they swept the Regional and then completed a run to the title game of the Women's College World Series where they fell to champion Arizona.

== Personnel ==
=== Roster ===
1993 UCLA Bruins roster
Pitchers: 10 – Heather Compton – senior; 16 - Lisa Fernandez – senior; Catchers: 2 - Kelly Inouye - (redshirt) Senior; 7 – Joanne Alchin; 9 – Cindy Valero – sophomore	Infielders: 4 – Kristy Howard – senior; 17 – Nichole Victoria – sophomore; 32 - Jennifer Brundage – sophomore; Outfielders: 3 – Felicia Cruz – sophomore; 22 – Kathi Evans – sophomore	Utility: 12 – Janae Deffenbaugh – junior; 13 – Jenny Brewster – sophomore; - Nicole Anderson; - Kelly Howard – freshman; - Becky Toler

=== Coaches ===
1993 UCLA Bruins softball coaching staff
- Sharron Backus - co-Head coach - 19th season
- Sue Enquist - co-Head coach - 5th season
- Kirk Walker - Assistant Coach - 4th season

== Schedule ==
Legend
	UCLA win
	UCLA loss
*	Non-Conference game

1993 UCLA Bruins softball game log
Regular season

February
Date	Opponent	Site/stadium	Score	Overall record	Pac-10 record
Feb 11	Cal State Northridge*	Sunset Field • Los Angeles, CA	L 1–2	0–1	
Feb 11	Cal State Northridge*	Sunset Field • Los Angeles, CA	W 7–2^{6}	1–1	
Feb 13	at Fresno State*	Tempe, AZ (Arizona State Coke Classic)	W 1–0^{9}	2–1	
Feb 13	at Fresno State*	Tempe, AZ (Arizona State Coke Classic)	W 2–1^{6}	3–1	
Feb 19	vs UNLV*	Tempe, AZ (Arizona State Coke Classic)	W 3–1	4–1	
Feb 19	vs Utah State*	Tempe, AZ (Arizona State Coke Classic)	W 1–0	5–1	
Feb 20	vs Fresno State*	Tempe, AZ (Arizona State Coke Classic)	W 4–0	6–1	
Feb 21	vs Oklahoma State*	Tempe, AZ (Arizona State Coke Classic)	W 7–0	7–1	
Feb 21	vs Illinois State*	Tempe, AZ (Arizona State Coke Classic)	W 3–0	8–1	
Feb 26	vs Utah*	Tempe, AZ (Arizona State Coke Classic)	W 5–0	9–1	
Feb 26	vs Cal State Northridge*	Tempe, AZ (Arizona State Coke Classic)	W 6–0	10–1	

March
Date	Opponent	Site/stadium	Score	Overall record	Pac-10 record
Mar 4	UC Santa Barbara*	Sunset Field • Los Angeles, CA	W 1–0	11–1	
Mar 4	UC Santa Barbara*	Sunset Field • Los Angeles, CA	W 3–0	12–1	
Mar 6	at Cal Poly Pomona*	Pomona, CA	L 0–1	12–2	
Mar 6	at Cal Poly Pomona*	Pomona, CA	W 10–0^{6}	13–2	
Mar 13	at Oregon State	Corvallis, OR	W 16–0^{5}	14–2	1–0
Mar 13	at Oregon State	Corvallis, OR	W 7–1	15–2	2–0
Mar 18	DePaul*	Sunset Field • Los Angeles, CA	W 5–1	16–2	
Mar 18	DePaul*	Sunset Field • Los Angeles, CA	W 7–0	17–2	
Mar 21	Oregon State	Sunset Field • Los Angeles, CA	W 11–1^{6}	18–2	3–0
Mar 21	Oregon State	Sunset Field • Los Angeles, CA	W 4–0	19–2	4–0
Mar 29	Oregon	Sunset Field • Los Angeles, CA	W 3–0	20–2	5–0
Mar 29	Oregon	Sunset Field • Los Angeles, CA	W 2–1	21–2	6–0

April
Date	Opponent	Site/stadium	Score	Overall record	Pac-10 record
Apr 3	at Arizona State	Tempe, AZ	W 3–0	22–2	7–0
Apr 3	at Arizona State	Tempe, AZ	W 6–0	23–2	8–0
Apr 4	at Arizona	Rita Hillenbrand Memorial Stadium • Tucson, AZ	L 0–2	23–3	8–1
Apr 4	at Arizona	Rita Hillenbrand Memorial Stadium • Tucson, AZ	W 5–1	24–3	9–1
Apr 9	Stanford	Sunset Field • Los Angeles, CA	W 12–0^{5}	25–3	10–1
Apr 9	Stanford	Sunset Field • Los Angeles, CA	W 21–0^{5}	26–3	11–1
Apr 10	California	Sunset Field • Los Angeles, CA	W 1–0^{11}	27–3	12–1
Apr 10	California	Sunset Field • Los Angeles, CA	W 5–0	28–3	13–1
Apr 13	Long Beach State*	Sunset Field • Los Angeles, CA	W 1–0	29–3	
Apr 13	Long Beach State*	Sunset Field • Los Angeles, CA	W 2–0	30–3	
Apr 16	at Washington	Hidden Valley Park • Bellevue, WA	W 1–0	31–3	14–1
Apr 16	at Washington	Hidden Valley Park • Bellevue, WA	W 10–2	32–3	15–1
Apr 18	at Washington	Hidden Valley Park • Bellevue, WA	W 3–0	33–3	16–1
Apr 18	at Washington	Hidden Valley Park • Bellevue, WA	W 4–0	34–3	17–1
Apr 24	Arizona State	Sunset Field • Los Angeles, CA	W 9–0	35–3	18–1
Apr 24	Arizona State	Sunset Field • Los Angeles, CA	W 1–0	36–3	19–1
Apr 25	Arizona	Sunset Field • Los Angeles, CA	W 1–0	37–3	20–1
Apr 25	Arizona	Sunset Field • Los Angeles, CA	W 6–5	38–3	21–1
Apr 28	Cal Poly Pomona*	Sunset Field • Los Angeles, CA	W 2–0	39–3	
Apr 28	Cal Poly Pomona*	Sunset Field • Los Angeles, CA	W 7–2	40–3	

May
Date	Opponent	Site/stadium	Score	Overall record	Pac-10 record
May 1	at California	Hearst Field • Berkeley, CA	W 2–0	41–3	22–1
May 1	at California	Hearst Field • Berkeley, CA	W 4–1	42–3	23–1
May 2	at Stanford	Stanford, CA	W 17–0^{5}	43–3	24–1
May 2	at Stanford	Stanford, CA	W 19–0^{5}	44–3	25–1

Postseason

NCAA Regional
Date	Opponent	Site/stadium	Score	Overall record	NCAAT record
May 21	Cal State Fullerton	Sunset Field • Los Angeles, CA	W 2–1^{10}	45–3	1–0
May 22	Cal State Fullerton	Sunset Field • Los Angeles, CA	W 1–0	46–3	2–0

NCAA Women's College World Series
Date	Opponent	Seed	Site/stadium	Score	Overall record	WCWS Record
May 27	(8) Connecticut	(1)	ASA Hall of Fame Stadium • Oklahoma City, OK	W 3–0	47–3	1–0
May 29	(4) Oklahoma State	(1)	ASA Hall of Fame Stadium • Oklahoma City, OK	L 0–1^{13}	47–4	1–1
May 29	(2) Cal State Northridge	(1)	ASA Hall of Fame Stadium • Oklahoma City, OK	W 2–0	48–4	2–1
May 30	(4) Oklahoma State	(1)	ASA Hall of Fame Stadium • Oklahoma City, OK	W 5–0	49–4	4–0
May 31	(7) Southwestern Louisiana	(1)	ASA Hall of Fame Stadium • Oklahoma City, OK	W 1–0	50–4	4–1
May 31	(3) Arizona	(1)	ASA Hall of Fame Stadium • Oklahoma City, OK	L 0–1	50–5	4–2
