= 1993 Arizona Wildcats softball team =

American college softball season

1993 Arizona Wildcats softball

National Champion NCAA Regional champion
- Conference: Pacific-10 Conference
- Record: 44–8 (15–3 Pac-10)
- Head coach: Mike Candrea (8th season)
- Home stadium: Rita Hillenbrand Memorial Stadium

1993 Pacific-10 Conference softball standings
	Conf.				Overall
Team	W		L	PCT	W		L	PCT
UCLA ‍†‍‍^{y}	25	–	1	.962	50	–	5	.909
Arizona ‍‍‍^{y}	15	–	3	.833	44	–	8	.846
Arizona State ‍‍‍^{y}	13	–	11	.542	34	–	26	.567
California ‍‍‍^{y}	12	–	10	.545	37	–	20	.649
Oregon ‍‍‍	8	–	8	.500	18	–	16	.529
Oregon State ‍‍‍	6	–	13	.316	13	–	19	.406
Washington ‍‍‍	7	–	18	.280	31	–	27	.534
Stanford ‍‍‍	0	–	22	.000	1	–	41	.024
† – Conference champion y – Invited to the NCAA tournament

The 1993 Arizona Wildcats softball team represented the University of Arizona in the 1993 NCAA Division I softball season. The Wildcats were coached by Mike Candrea, who led his eighth season. The Wildcats finished with a record of 44–8. They played their home games at Rita Hillenbrand Memorial Stadium and competed in the Pacific-10 Conference, where they finished second with a 15–3 record.

This was the first season playing at Rita Hillenbrand Memorial Stadium, which was completed prior to the season.

The Wildcats were invited to the 1993 NCAA Division I softball tournament, where they swept the West Regional and then completed a run through the Women's College World Series to claim their second NCAA Women's College World Series Championship.

== Roster ==
1993 Arizona Wildcats roster
Pitchers: 1 – Susie Parra – junior; 20 - Leah O'Brien – freshman; Catchers: 4 – Michelle Martinez – junior; 15 – Jody Miller-Pruitt – senior	Infielders: 5 – Susie Duarte – junior; 8 – Krista Gomez – freshman; 13 – Amy Chellevold – sophomore; 16 - Jenny Dalton – freshman; 30 – Laura Espinoza – sophomore	Outfielders: 7 – Valerie Zepeda – junior; 10 – Renee Rosas – senior; 11 – Lisa Guise – senior; 23 – Stacy Redondo – senior; 24 – Jamie Heggen – senior

== Schedule ==
Legend
	Arizona win
	Arizona loss
*	Non-Conference game

1993 Arizona Wildcats softball game log
Regular season

February
Date	Opponent	Site/stadium	Score	Overall record	Pac-10 record
Feb 13	UTSA*	Rita Hillenbrand Memorial Stadium • Tucson, AZ	W 10–0^{5}	1–0	
Feb 13	UTSA*	Rita Hillenbrand Memorial Stadium • Tucson, AZ	W 14–0^{5}	2–0	
Feb 19	vs Fresno State*	Tempe, AZ	W 1–0	3–0	
Feb 20	vs Cal Poly Pomona*	Tempe, AZ	W 13–6	4–0	
Feb 20	vs Oklahoma State*	Tempe, AZ	W 7–0^{5}	5–0	
Feb 21	vs UNLV*	Tempe, AZ	W 4–2	6–0	
Feb 23	Michigan*	Rita Hillenbrand Memorial Stadium • Tucson, AZ	W 4–1	7–0	
Feb 23	Michigan*	Rita Hillenbrand Memorial Stadium • Tucson, AZ	W 12–0^{5}	8–0	

March
Date	Opponent	Site/stadium	Score	Overall record	Pac-10 record
Mar 3	Washington*	Rita Hillenbrand Memorial Stadium • Tucson, AZ	W 11–2	9–0	1–0
Mar 3	Washington*	Rita Hillenbrand Memorial Stadium • Tucson, AZ	W 10–0^{5}	10–0	2–0
Mar 4	Northwestern*	Rita Hillenbrand Memorial Stadium • Tucson, AZ	W 13–2^{5}	11–0	
Mar 4	Fresno State*	Rita Hillenbrand Memorial Stadium • Tucson, AZ	W 8–4	12–0	
Mar 5	Minnesota*	Rita Hillenbrand Memorial Stadium • Tucson, AZ	W 2–1	13–0	
Mar 5	Washington*	Rita Hillenbrand Memorial Stadium • Tucson, AZ	W 7–4	14–0	
Mar 6	Ohio State*	Rita Hillenbrand Memorial Stadium • Tucson, AZ	W 17–2^{5}	15–0	
Mar 6	Northwestern*	Rita Hillenbrand Memorial Stadium • Tucson, AZ	W 13–0^{5}	16–0	
Mar 7	Washington*	Rita Hillenbrand Memorial Stadium • Tucson, AZ	W 3–2	17–0	
Mar 7	Fresno State*	Rita Hillenbrand Memorial Stadium • Tucson, AZ	W 5–1	18–0	
Mar 10	New Mexico State*	Rita Hillenbrand Memorial Stadium • Tucson, AZ	W 10–0^{6}	19–0	
Mar 10	New Mexico State*	Rita Hillenbrand Memorial Stadium • Tucson, AZ	W 12–0^{6}	20–0	
Mar 12	Northern Illinois*	Rita Hillenbrand Memorial Stadium • Tucson, AZ	W 4–0	21–0	
Mar 12	Northern Illinois*	Rita Hillenbrand Memorial Stadium • Tucson, AZ	L 3–9	21–1	
Mar 17	at Fresno State*	Fresno, CA	W 2–0	22–1	
Mar 17	at Fresno State*	Fresno, CA	L 4–6	22–2	
Mar 25	vs Texas A&M*	Titan Softball Complex • Fullerton, CA	W 2–1	23–2	
Mar 25	vs Ohio State*	Titan Softball Complex • Fullerton, CA	W 8–0^{6}	24–2	
Mar 26	vs Cal State Northridge*	Titan Softball Complex • Fullerton, CA	L 1–2	24–3	
Mar 26	at Cal State Fullerton*	Titan Softball Complex • Fullerton, CA	W 5–4^{8}	25–3	
Mar 27	vs Oklahoma State*	Titan Softball Complex • Fullerton, CA	L 0–6	25–4	

April
Date	Opponent	Site/stadium	Score	Overall record	Pac-10 record
Apr 4	UCLA	Rita Hillenbrand Memorial Stadium • Tucson, AZ	W 2–0	26–4	3–0
Apr 4	UCLA	Rita Hillenbrand Memorial Stadium • Tucson, AZ	L 1–5	26–5	3–1
Apr 7	at Arizona State	Tempe, AZ	W 10–0	27–5	4–1
Apr 7	at Arizona State	Tempe, AZ	W 7–1	28–5	5–1
Apr 18	California	Rita Hillenbrand Memorial Stadium • Tucson, AZ	W 1–0	29–5	6–1
Apr 18	California	Rita Hillenbrand Memorial Stadium • Tucson, AZ	W 3–2	30–5	7–1
Apr 21	Arizona State	Rita Hillenbrand Memorial Stadium • Tucson, AZ	W 3–1^{8}	31–5	8–1
Apr 21	Arizona State	Rita Hillenbrand Memorial Stadium • Tucson, AZ	W 5–2	32–5	9–1
Apr 25	at UCLA	Sunset Field • Los Angeles, CA	L 0–1	32–6	9–2
Apr 25	at UCLA	Sunset Field • Los Angeles, CA	L 5–6	32–7	9–3

May
Date	Opponent	Site/stadium	Score	Overall record	Pac-10 record
May 1	Oregon	Rita Hillenbrand Memorial Stadium • Tucson, AZ	W 3–0	33–7	10–3
May 1	Oregon	Rita Hillenbrand Memorial Stadium • Tucson, AZ	W 9–0	34–7	11–3
May 2	Oregon State	Rita Hillenbrand Memorial Stadium • Tucson, AZ	W 10–0	35–7	12–3
May 2	Oregon State	Rita Hillenbrand Memorial Stadium • Tucson, AZ	W 12–2	36–7	13–3
May 4	at Washington	Seattle, WA	W 2–0	37–7	14–3
May 4	at Washington	Seattle, WA	W 7–4	38–7	15–3

Postseason

NCAA Regional
Date	Opponent	Site/stadium	Score	Overall record	NCAAT record
May 21	Arizona State	Rita Hillenbrand Memorial Stadium • Tucson, AZ	W 1–0	39–7	1–0
May 22	Arizona State	Rita Hillenbrand Memorial Stadium • Tucson, AZ	W 7–2	40–7	2–0

NCAA Women's College World Series
Date	Opponent	Site/stadium	Score	Overall record	WCWS Record
May 28	Long Beach State	ASA Hall of Fame Stadium • Oklahoma City, OK	W 6–0	41–7	1–0
May 29	Southwestern Louisiana	ASA Hall of Fame Stadium • Oklahoma City, OK	W 2–1^{10}	42–7	2–0
May 30	Oklahoma State	ASA Hall of Fame Stadium • Oklahoma City, OK	W 1–0^{9}	43–7	3–0
May 30	Southwestern Louisiana	ASA Hall of Fame Stadium • Oklahoma City, OK	L 0–1	43–8	3–1
May 31	UCLA	ASA Hall of Fame Stadium • Oklahoma City, OK	W 1–0	44–8	4–1
