= 1993 NCAA Division I softball tournament =

- Teams: 20
- Finals site: ASA Hall of Fame Stadium; Oklahoma City, Oklahoma
- Champions: Arizona (2nd title)
- Runner-up: UCLA (11th WCWS Appearance)
- Winning coach: Mike Candrea (2nd title)

The 1993 NCAA Division I softball tournament was the twelfth annual tournament to determine the national champion of NCAA women's collegiate softball. Held during May 1993, twenty Division I college softball teams contested the championship. The tournament featured eight regionals of either two or three teams, each in a double elimination format. The 1993 Women's College World Series was held in Oklahoma City, Oklahoma from May 27 through May 31 and marked the conclusion of the 1993 NCAA Division I softball season. Arizona won their second championship by defeating defending champions UCLA 1–0 in the final game.

== Regionals ==
=== Regional No. 1 ===
Team		G1	G2	G3
–	UCLA	2^{10}	1	—
–	Cal State Fullerton	1	0	—

- UCLA qualifies for WCWS, 2–0

=== Regional No. 2 ===
Team		G1	G2	G3
–	Cal State Northridge	2	0	2
–	Fresno State	2	2	0

- Cal State Northridge qualifies for WCWS, 2–1

=== Regional No. 3 ===
Team		G1	G2	G3
–	Arizona	1	7	—
–	Arizona State	0	2	—

- Arizona qualifies for WCWS, 2–0

=== Regional No. 4 ===
Team		G1	G2	G3
–	Oklahoma State	4	4	—
–	Utah State	0	2	—

- Oklahoma State qualifies for WCWS, 2–0

=== Regional No. 5 ===
==== First elimination round ====
- Kansas 1^{10}, Florida State 0
- Kansas 3, Iowa 1
- Florida State 5^{15}, Iowa 3

==== Second elimination round ====
Team		G1	G2
–	Florida State	5^{8}	2
–	Kansas	0	1

- Florida State qualifies for WCWS, 3–1

=== Regional No. 6 ===
==== First elimination round ====
- UNLV 2, Connecticut 1
- Connecticut 2, Hofstra 1
- UNLV 6, Hofstra 0

==== Second elimination round ====
Team		G1	G2
–	Connecticut	2	2
–	UNLV	0	0

- Connecticut qualifies for WCWS, 3–1

=== Regional No. 7 ===
==== First elimination round ====
- Long Beach State 1, Sacramento State 0
- California 1^{9}, Sacramento State 0
- Long Beach State 5, California 2

==== Second elimination round ====
Team		G1	G2
–	Long Beach State	0	2
–	California	1	1

- Long Beach State qualifies for WCWS, 3–1

=== Regional No. 8 ===
==== First elimination round ====
- Southwestern Louisiana 7, Bowling Green 3
- Michigan 8, Bowling Green 2
- Southwestern Louisiana 6, Michigan 5

==== Second elimination round ====
Team		G1	G2
–	Southwestern Louisiana	2	—
–	Michigan	1	—

- Southwestern Louisiana qualifies for WCWS, 3–0

== Women's College World Series ==
=== Participants ===
1. UCLA
2. Cal State Northridge
3. Arizona
4. Oklahoma State
5. Florida State
6. Long Beach State
7. Southwestern Louisiana
8. Connecticut

=== Game results ===
==== Bracket ====
Upper round 1
1	UCLA	3
8	Connecticut	0
4	Oklahoma State	5
5	Florida State	2
3	Arizona	6
6	Long Beach State	0
2	Cal State Northridge	2
7	Southwestern Louisiana	4

Upper round 2
1	UCLA	0
4	Oklahoma State	1^{13}
3	Arizona	2
7	Southwestern Louisiana	1
Lower round 1
8	Connecticut	2^{8}
5	Florida State	1
6	Long Beach State	2
2	Cal State Northridge	4

Upper final
4	Oklahoma State	0
3	Arizona	1^{9}
Lower round 2
7	Southwestern Louisiana	1
8	Connecticut	0
1	UCLA	2
2	Cal State Northridge	0

Semifinals
3	Arizona	0
7	Southwestern Louisiana	1
4	Oklahoma State	0
1	UCLA	5

Preliminary final
7	Southwestern Louisiana	0
1	UCLA	1

Final
1	UCLA	0
3	Arizona	1

=== Championship Game ===
School	Top Batter	Stats.
Arizona Wildcats	Leah O'Brien (DP)	1-3 RBI
UCLA Bruins	Lisa Fernandez (P)	1-2 BB

School	Pitcher	IP	H	R	ER	BB	SO	AB
Arizona Wildcats	Susie Parra (W)	7.0	2	0	0	2	6	22
UCLA Bruins	Lisa Fernandez (L)	6.0	1	1	0	1	4	19

=== All-Tournament Team ===
The following players were named to the All-Tournament Team

Pos	Name	School
P	Lisa Fernandez	UCLA
P	Susie Parra	Arizona
C	Jody Pruitt	Arizona
1B	Amy Chellevold	Arizona
2B	Krista Gomez	Arizona
3B	Nichole Victoria	UCLA
SS	April Austin	Oklahoma State
OF	Stacy Redondo	Arizona
OF	Kathy Morton	Southwestern Louisiana
OF	Andrea D’Innocenzo	Connecticut
AL	Melanie Roche	Oklahoma State
AL	Kyla Hall	Southwestern Louisiana

== See also ==
- 1993 NCAA Division II softball tournament
- 1993 NCAA Division III softball tournament
- 1993 NAIA softball tournament
- 1993 NCAA Division I baseball tournament
