= Cowgirl Stadium =

Softball facility in Stillwater, Oklahoma, US

- Interactive map of Cowgirl Stadium
- Former names: Cowgirl Field
- Location: Stillwater, Oklahoma
- Coordinates: 36.12983°N 97.06358°W
- Owner: Oklahoma State University
- Seating type: Chair backs and Bleachers
- Capacity: 750
- Type: Stadium

Construction
- Opened: 1979
- Renovated: 1999
- Cost: $2 million

Cowgirl Stadium is a softball facility and home field to the Oklahoma State University softball team. The team is an NCAA Division I competitor, and plays in the Big 12 Conference. The stadium is located in Stillwater, Oklahoma, on the northeast corner of the Oklahoma State University campus, north of the corner of Duck and near the men's baseball Allie P. Reynolds Stadium, and Bennett Hall.

== Early history ==
In 1975, the Oklahoma State University Softball Team began playing on a field where later the future stadium would be built. The location was designated as Cowgirl Field. At the time there was no outfield fence or spectator seating. Recognizing the need to support the team with a better facility, the Oklahoma State University Board of Regents authorized improvements with an estimated cost of $45,000 in the fall of 1978. By the spring of 1979 construction began on the facility with the first games being held the following year at the new facility in the spring of 1980. A press box was added in 1981. Development of the facility was divided into three phases: the playing field, parking for players and spectators, and field lighting. The first phase included a dirt infield and grass outfield with a warning track, outfield perimeter fencing, and temporary bleachers. The second phase included the addition of aluminum bleachers to accommodate the growing attendance and a parking area was designated. To complete the third phase of field lighting, funding was sought from gifts through the OSU Foundation for the estimated cost of $38,000.

== Renovation ==
After 20 years, construction for a new facility began on June 14, 1999. Funding for the estimated $2 million construction cost came from the sponsor's money made from the football game between Oklahoma State and Nebraska at Kansas City's Arrowhead Stadium on October 3, 1998. New dugouts, a concession, and restroom facilities were part of the first phase of the renovation. In 2002, other additions included, a locker room, coaches' offices, a player's lounge and training room. A new scoreboard was installed in 2004 and a new infield in 2005. The facility was named Cowgirl Stadium.

== Opening ==
On April 5, 2000 the Cowgirl Stadium opened with the Cowgirls playing in a bedlam a game against the Sooners of the University of Oklahoma. A packed attendance that evening was record setting, filling the stadium to its capacity of 750.
