= 1982 NCAA Division I softball tournament =

- Teams: 16
- Finals site: Seymour Smith Park; Omaha, NE
- Champions: UCLA (1st NCAA (2nd overall) WCWS title)
- Runner-up: Fresno State (1st WCWS Appearance)
- Winning coach: Sharron Backus (1st NCAA (2nd overall) WCWS title)

The finals of the 1982 NCAA Division I softball tournament were held from May 27 through May 30. 16 Division I college softball teams met in the NCAA tournament's first round at campus sites. After having played their way through the regular season and first round (and for Oklahoma State, a conference tournament, an AIAW regional title and double losses to Texas A&M in the AIAW Women's College World Series final on May 25), the eight advancing teams played in the NCAA Women's College World Series in Omaha, Nebraska. UCLA won the title. Historian Bill Plummer III wrote, "With their 77-8 season record, Texas A&M could have been a contender in Omaha − maybe even the top seed − against perennial softball powers like UCLA and Fresno State. The Aggies had been invited to the NCAA's first national tournament, but chose not to go. A&M coach Bob Brock had high respect for the eleven-year-old AIAW, even as the NCAA began to overshadow it. Out of a sense of loyalty to the AIAW, Brock said, his school chose the 1982 Norman championship over the NCAA's first in Omaha."

== Regionals ==
Northeast Regional
Western Michigan	2^{10}	0	7
Adelphi	0	1	0

Western Michigan qualifies for WCWS, 2–1

Atlantic Regional
Cal State Fullerton	4	11	—
Bowling Green	1	0	—

Cal State Fullerton qualifies for WCWS, 2–0.

South Regional
Creighton	7	3	—
South Carolina	0	2	—

Creighton qualifies for WCWS, 2–0.

Mideast Regional
Nebraska	1^{11}	0	4
Missouri	0	1	1

Nebraska qualifies for WCWS, 2–1.

Midwest Regional
Oklahoma State	1^{9}	3^{11}	—
Cal Poly Pomona	0	2	—

Oklahoma State qualifies for WCWS, 2–0.

Central Regional
UCLA	4	5	—
Wyoming	0	0	—

UCLA qualifies for WCWS, 2–0.

West Regional
California	1	1	1
Arizona State	0	3^{8}	2

Arizona State qualifies for WCWS, 2–1.

Northwest Regional
Fresno State	2^{9}	1	4
Pacific	0	5	0

Fresno State qualifies for WCWS, 2–1.

== Women's College World Series ==
=== Participants ===
These eight teams met at Seymour Smith Park to decide the 1982 NCAA Division I Softball Championship:

- Arizona State
- Cal State Fullerton
- Creighton
- Fresno State
- Nebraska
- Oklahoma State
- UCLA
- Western Michigan

=== Bracket ===
Upper round 1
Arizona State	2^{9}
Cal State Fullerton	0
Creighton	2
Nebraska	3^{8}
Oklahoma State	1
UCLA	2^{13}
Fresno State	0
Western Michigan	5

Upper round 2
Arizona State	2
Nebraska	0
UCLA	1
Western Michigan	0
Lower round 1
Cal State Fullerton	4^{8}
Creighton	1
Oklahoma State	0
Fresno State	1^{14}

Upper final
Arizona State	0
UCLA	1
Lower round 2
Western Michigan	0
Cal State Fullerton	1^{8}
Nebraska	0
Fresno State	1

Semifinals
UCLA	1^{10}
Cal State Fullerton	0
Arizona State	1
Fresno State	4

Final
UCLA	2^{8}
Fresno State	0

=== Championship Game ===
School	Top Batter	Stats.
UCLA Bruins	Debbie Hauer (1B)	0-3 RBI 2Ks
Fresno State Bulldogs	Sandi Taylor (2B)	1-2 BB

School	Pitcher	IP	H	R	ER	BB	SO	AB	BF
UCLA Bruins	Debbie Doom (W)	8.0	2	0	0	1	12	26	27
Fresno State Bulldogs	Wende Ward (L)	8.0	1	2	1	4	8	24	28

== See also ==
- 1982 NCAA Division II softball tournament
- 1982 NCAA Division III softball tournament
- 1982 NAIA softball tournament
- 1982 AIAW Women's College World Series
- 1982 AIAW slow-pitch softball tournament
- 1982 NCAA Division I baseball tournament
