= 2017 BYU Cougars softball team =

American college softball season

2017 BYU Cougars softball

2017 WCC Champions

NCAA, SLC Region
- Conference: West Coast Conference
- Record: 45–11 (14–1 WCC)
- Head coach: Gordon Eakin (15th season)
- Assistant coaches: Pete Meredith (4th season); Kristin Delahoussaye (4th season)
- Home stadium: Gail Miller Field

2017 West Coast Conference softball standings
	Conf.						Overall
Team	W		L		T	PCT	W		L		T	PCT
No. 20 BYU ‍†‍‍^{y}	14	–	1	–	0	.933	45	–	11	–	0	.804
Pacific ‍‍‍	10	–	5	–	0	.667	27	–	24	–	0	.529
San Diego ‍‍‍	8	–	7	–	0	.533	22	–	22	–	0	.500
Loyola Marymount ‍‍‍	6	–	9	–	0	.400	20	–	31	–	0	.392
Santa Clara ‍‍‍	4	–	11	–	0	.267	12	–	37	–	0	.245
Saint Mary's ‍‍‍	3	–	12	–	0	.200	17	–	31	–	0	.354
† – Conference champion y – Invited to the NCAA tournament As of May 18, 2017; Rankings from USA Today/NFCA Coaches

The 2017 BYU Cougars softball team represented Brigham Young University in the 2017 NCAA Division I softball season. Gordon Eakin entered the year as head coach of the Cougars for a 15th consecutive season. 2017 is the fourth season for the Cougars as members of the WCC in softball. The Cougars enter 2017 having won their last 8 conference championships and as the favorites in the WCC.

== 2017 roster ==
2017 BYU Cougars roster
Pitchers: 5 McKenna Bull – senior; 7 Arianna Paulson – junior; 10 Arissa Paulson – freshman; 24 Olivia Sanchez – sophomore; 33 Kerisa Viramontes – freshman; Catchers: 6 Ashley Godfrey – sophomore; 8 Emilee Erickson – sophomore; 21 Libby Sugg – sophomore	Infielders: 3 Ashley Thompson – senior; 7 Arianna Paulson – junior; 9 Lauren Bell – senior; 10 Arissa Paulson – freshman; 12 Briielle Breland – junior; 13 McKenzie St. Clair – senior; 16 Alexa Strid – junior; 18 Caitlyn Larsen Alldredge- Junior; 24 Olivia Sanchez – sophomore	Outfielders: 1 Brooke Wander Heide – freshman; 6 Ashley Godfrey – sophomore; 12 Briielle Breland – junior; 13 McKenzie St. Clair – senior; 18 Caitlyn Larsen Alldredge- Junior; 22 Madison Merrell – junior; 26 Lexi Tarrow – sophomore

== Schedule ==
Date	Time	Opponent	Rank^{#}	Site	Result	Attendance	Winning Pitcher	Losing Pitcher
Puerto Vallarta College Challenge
February 9*	9:00 AM	Nebraska		Nancy Almaraz Stadium • Puerto Vallarta	W 12–1^{(5)}	400	McKenna Bull (1–0)	Kaylan Jablonski (0-1)
February 9*	3:00 PM	#1 Oklahoma		Nancy Almaraz Stadium • Puerto Vallarta	L 1–7	324	Paige Parker (1–0)	Arianna Paulson (0-1)
February 10*	6:00 PM	#13 Washington		Nancy Almaraz Stadium • Puerto Vallarta	W 4–2	1,100	McKenna Bull (2–0)	Madi Schreyer (0–1)
February 11*	9:00 AM	#2 Auburn		Nancy Almaraz Stadium • Puerto Vallarta	L 0–3	656	Makayla Martin (2–1)	Arissa Paulson (0–1)
DeMari Desert Classic
February 16*	5:30 PM	Hawaiʻi	#25	Eller Media Stadium • Las Vegas, NV	W 7–5	200	McKenna Bull (3–0)	Brittany Hitchcock (1–2)
February 17*	11:00 AM	Texas State	#25	Stephanie Lynn Craig Park • Henderson, NV	W 5–3	150	McKenna Bull (4–0)	Jodi Paige Williams (2–1)
February 17*	12:15 PM	Nevada		Stephanie Lynn Craig Park • Henderson, NV	W 8–0^{(5)}	220	Kerisa Viramontes (1–0)	Kali Sargent (2–2)
February 18*	11:00 AM	San Jose State		Eller Media Stadium • Las Vegas, NV	Canceled			
February 18*	3:30 PM	Northern Iowa		Eller Media Stadium • Las Vegas, NV	Canceled			
Mary Nutter Collegiate Classic
February 23*	11:00 AM	#11 Georgia	#23	Big League Dreams Complex • Cathedral City, CA	W 4–0	208	McKenna Bull (5–0)	Brittany Gray (7-1)
February 23*	1:30 PM	#9 Arizona	#23	Big League Dreams Complex • Cathedral City, CA	L 0–9^{(6)}	311	Danielle O'Toole (8-0)	Arissa Paulson (0–2)
February 24*	11:00 AM	Louisville	#23	Big League Dreams Complex • Cathedral City, CA	W 4–0	124	McKenna Bull (6–0)	Maryssa Becker (6-4)
February 24*	4:00 PM	LIU Brooklyn	#23	Big League Dreams Complex • Cathedral City, CA	L 5–10	150	Erynn Sobieski (2-2)	Kerisa Viramontes (1–1)
February 25*	10:30 AM	#18 Texas A&M	#23	Big League Dreams Complex • Cathedral City, CA	L 1–11	472	Samantha Show (6–0)	McKenna Bull (6–2)
San Diego Classic 1
March 2*	2:00 PM	McNeese State		SDSU Softball Stadium • San Diego, CA	W 3–6	166	Rachel Smith (3-3)	Kerissa Viramontes (1–2)
March 2*	7:00 PM	San Diego State		SDSU Softball Stadium • San Diego, CA	W 5–1	182	McKenna Bull (7–1)	Marissa Moreno (4–2)
March 3*	2:00 PM	Miami (OH)		USD Softball Complex • San Diego, CA	W 6–2	111	McKenna Bull (8–1)	Kelsey Fredericks (2-5)
March 3*	4:30 PM	Detroit		USD Softball Complex • San Diego, CA	W 16–0^{(5)}	135	Arianna Paulson (1–1)	Ashley Mauser (0–5)
March 4*	2:00 PM	Boston		USD Softball Complex • San Diego, CA	W 9–0^{(5)}	212	McKenna Bull (9–1)	Lizzie Annerino (0-1)
Fresno State Invitational
March 10*	1:00 PM	Sacramento State	#25	Bulldog Diamond • Fresno, CA	W 7–1	50	Arissa Paulson (1–2)	Celina Matthias (3-4)
March 10*	3:30 PM	Fresno State	#25	Bulldog Diamond • Fresno, CA	L 1–6	975	Savannah Mchellon (2–3)	McKenna Bull (9–2)
March 11*	11:00 AM	Savannah State	#25	Bulldog Diamond • Fresno, CA	W 9–4	102	Arianna Paulson (2–1)	Savanna Corr (1–1)
March 11*	4:30 PM	Fresno State	#25	Bulldog Diamond • Fresno, CA	W 8–6	992	McKenna Bull (10-2)	Kamalani Dung (10-5)
Regular Season
March 15*	4:00 PM	Maine	#25	Gail Miller Field • Provo, UT	W 8–0^{(5)}	320	McKenna Bull (11–2)	Erin Bogdanovich (1-6)
March 15*	6:30 PM	Maine	#25	Gail Miller Field • Provo, UT	W 10–4	459	Arianna Paulson (3–1)	Molly Flowers (1–5)
March 16*	4:00 PM	Wagner	#25	Gail Miller Field • Provo, UT	W 7–1	395	McKenna Bull (12–2)	McKaleigh Goodale (0-7)
March 16*	6:30 PM	Wagner	#25	Gail Miller Field • Provo, UT	W 5–4	395	McKenna Bull (13–2)	McKaleigh Goodale (0-8)
Deseret First Duel
March 22*	5:00 PM	#11 Utah		Gail Miller Field • Provo, UT	W 4–3	804	McKenna Bull (14–2)	Katie Donovan (11-5)
UCLA Invitational
March 24*	1:00 PM	Dartmouth		Easton Stadium • Los Angeles, CA	W 4–0	126	McKenna Bull (15–2)	Morgan Ebow (0–6)
March 24*	3:30 PM	Dartmouth		Easton Stadium • Los Angeles, CA	W 5–1	126	Arissa Paulson (2-2)	Breanna Ethridge (0-9)
March 25*	1:00 PM	#15 UCLA		Easton Stadium • Los Angeles, CA	L 0–1	612	Rachel Garcia (8-4)	McKenna Bull (15-3)
March 25*	3:30 PM	#15 UCLA		Easton Stadium • Los Angeles, CA	L 2–4	612	Johanna Grauer (8–3)	Arissa Paulson (2–3)
Regular Season
March 30*	6:30 PM	#1 Oregon	#25	Jane Sanders Stadium • Eugene, OR	L 0–1	1,987	Maggie Balint (14-0)	McKenna Bull (15-4)
March 31*	2:00 PM	Oregon State	#25	OSU Softball Complex • Corvallis, OR	W 4–2	238	Arianna Paulson (3-3)	Nerissa Eason (7-9)
April 1*	1:00 PM	Oregon State	#25	OSU Softball Complex • Corvallis, OR	W 2–1	222	McKenna Bull (16-4)	Taylor Cotton (6-4)
April 5*	4:00 PM	Utah State	#22	LaRee & LeGrand Johnson Field • Logan, UT	W 8–6	603	McKenna Bull (17-4)	April Brown (9-3)
April 7	3:00 PM	Loyola Marymount	#22	Smith Field • Los Angeles, CA	W 8–0^{(6)}	50	McKenna Bull (18–4)	Rachael Farrington (5-11)
April 8	1:00 PM	Loyola Marymount	#22	Smith Field • Los Angeles, CA	W 5–1	406	Arissa Paulson (4–3)	Andy Wellins (4-9)
April 8	3:30 PM	Loyola Marymount	#22	Smith Field • Los Angeles, CA	W 2–0	2,552	McKenna Bull (19–4)	Rachael Farrington (5-12)
April 11*	2:00 PM	Southern Utah	#19	Kathryn Berg Field • Cedar City, UT	W 13–3^{(5)}	100	Arissa Paulson (5-3)	Kirsten Hostetler (5-6)
April 14	5:00 PM	Pacific	#20	Gail Miller Field • Provo, UT	W 10–0^{(5)}	2,386	McKenna Bull (20–4)	Hailey Reed (5-6)
April 14	7:30 PM	Pacific	#20	Gail Miller Field • Provo, UT	W 5–0	2,386	Arissa Paulson (6–3)	Marissa Young (5-5)
April 15	1:00 PM	Pacific	#20	Gail Miller Field • Provo, UT	W 14–0^{(5)}	700	McKenna Bull (21–4)	Marissa Young (5-6)
April 19*	6:00 PM	Southern Utah	#20	Gail Miller Field • Provo, UT	W 4–0	436	Arissa Paulson (7–3)	Samantha Guile (3-6)
UCCU Crosstown Clash
April 26*	6:00 PM	Utah Valley	#20	Gail Miller Field • Provo, UT	W 12–4^{(6)}	212	McKenna Bull (22–4)	Makayla Shadle (1-3)
Regular Season
April 28	5:00 PM	San Diego	#20	Gail Miller Field • Provo, UT	W 9–0^{(5)}	1,188	McKenna Bull (23–4)	Megan Sabbatini (10-10)
April 28	7:00 PM	San Diego	#20	Gail Miller Field • Provo, UT	W 10–1^{(5)}	1,188	Arissa Paulson (8–3)	Megan Sabbatini (10-11)
April 29	1:00 PM	San Diego	#20	Gail Miller Field • Provo, UT	W 11–0^{(5)}	480	McKenna Bull (24–4)	Megan Sabbatini (10-12)
May 3*	5:00 PM	Grand Canyon	#20	Gail Miller Field • Provo, UT	W 6–0	363	McKenna Bull (25–4)	Brianna Aguilar-Beaucage (12-7)
May 5	5:00 PM	Santa Clara	#20	SCU Softball Field • Santa Clara, CA	W 5–0	150	McKenna Bull (26-4)	Micaela Vierra (5-13)
May 5	8:00 PM	Santa Clara	#20	SCU Softball Field • Santa Clara, CA	W 3–1	150	McKenna Bull (27–4)	Aubree Kim (3-12)
May 6	8:30 PM	Santa Clara	#20	SCU Softball Field • Santa Clara, CA	W 19–5^{(5)}	150	Kerisa Viramontes (2-2)	Clara Gonzales (3–7)
UCCU Crosstown Clash
May 8*	5:00 PM	Utah Valley	#20	Gail Miller Field • Provo, UT	W 10–2^{(6)}	503	Arissa Paulson (9–3)	Bailey Moore (2-9)
Regular Season
May 9*	5:00 PM	Utah State	#20	Gail Miller Field • Provo, UT	W 4–1	2,392	McKenna Bull (28-4)	April Brown (13-7)
May 12	3:00 PM	Saint Mary's	#20	Cottrell Field • Moraga, CA	W 4–0	101	McKenna Bull (29–4)	Katie Moss (8–13)
May 13	1:00 PM	Saint Mary's	#20	Cottrell Field • Moraga, CA	L 0–1	122	Katie Moss (9-13)	McKenna Bull (29-5)
May 13	3:00 PM	Saint Mary's	#20	Cottrell Field • Moraga, CA	W 4–1	113	Arissa Paulson (10–3)	Katlyn Whitt (6-10)
2017 NCAA Division I softball tournament
May 18*	4:00 PM	Mississippi State	#20	Dumke Family Softball Stadium • Salt Lake City, UT	W 8–0^{(6)}	1,172	McKenna Bull (30–5)	Alexis Silkwood (15–7)
May 18*	1:00 PM	#13 Utah	#20	Dumke Family Softball Stadium • Salt Lake City, UT				
*Non-Conference Game. All times are in Mountain Time Zone.

== TV, radio, and streaming information ==
- Feb. 9:
- Feb. 9:
- Feb. 23:
- Feb. 23:
- Feb. 24:
- Feb. 24:
- Feb. 25:
- Mar. 2:
- Mar. 15: Spencer Linton & Gary Sheide
- Mar. 15: Spencer Linton & Gary Sheide
- Mar. 16:
- Mar. 16:
- Mar. 22: Spencer Linton & Gary Sheide
- Mar. 25:
- Mar. 25:
- Mar. 30:
- Apr. 5:
- Apr. 11:
- Apr. 14: Spencer Linton & Gary Sheide
- Apr. 14: Spencer Linton & Gary Sheide
- Apr. 15: Spencer Linton & Gary Sheide
- Apr. 19: Spencer Linton & Gary Sheide
- Apr. 26: Spencer Linton & Gary Sheide
- Apr. 28:
- Apr. 28:
- Apr. 29: Spencer Linton & Gary Sheide
- May 3:
- May 8:
- May 9:
- May 18:
