= Oklahoma State Cowgirls softball =

- Founded: 1975 (51 years ago)
- University: Oklahoma State University–Stillwater
- Head coach: Kenny Gajewski (11th season)
- Conference: Big 12
- Location: Stillwater, Oklahoma, US
- Home stadium: Cowgirl Stadium (capacity: 750)
- Nickname: Cowgirls
- Colors: Orange and black

NCAA WCWS appearances
- 1982, 1989, 1990, 1993, 1994, 1998, 2011, 2019, 2021, 2022, 2023, 2024

AIAW WCWS appearances
- 1977, 1980, 1981, 1982

NCAA super regional appearances
- 2011, 2019, 2021, 2022, 2023, 2024, 2026

NCAA Tournament appearances
- 1982, 1984, 1988, 1989, 1990, 1991, 1992, 1993, 1994, 1995, 1996, 1997, 1998, 2003, 2005, 2009, 2010, 2011, 2016, 2017, 2018, 2019, 2021, 2022, 2023, 2024, 2025, 2026

Conference tournament championships
- Big Eight; 1980, 1981, 1989, 1990, 1991, 1992 Big 12; 2022

Regular-season conference championships
- Big Eight; 1980, 1981, 1989, 1990, 1991, 1992, 1993, 1994, 1995

The Oklahoma State Cowgirls softball team represents Oklahoma State University–Stillwater in NCAA Division I college softball. The team participates in the Big 12 Conference. The Cowgirls are currently led by their head coach Kenny Gajewski. The team plays home games at Cowgirl Stadium which is located on the university's campus.

== History ==
=== 1977 AIAW College World Series ===
The 1977 Oklahoma State softball team was the first Oklahoma State team to reach the Women's College World Series, going 25–13 and representing the Big Eight Conference in Omaha. The Cowgirls fell in the opening game to Kansas before rebounding to defeat Southern Illinois for the first Women's College World Series win in program history. The Cowgirls were eliminated from the tournament after a loss to Missouri State.

=== 1980 AIAW College World Series ===
The 1980 Oklahoma State softball team won the Big Eight tournament title en route to a 34–20 record and second Women's College World Series qualification. In Norman, the Cowgirls rattled off two quick wins against Western Michigan and Cal Poly Pomona to move into the national quarterfinals. After being shutout by Indiana, Oklahoma State was eliminated after falling in a rematch against Western Michigan.

=== 1981 AIAW College World Series ===
The 1981 Oklahoma State softball team was the first team in the history of the program to win 40 games in a season, going 40–16 and winning another Big Eight tournament title. At the program's third Women's College World Series, the Cowgirls opened with a win over Michigan State before being defeated by Missouri. Oklahoma State was then unable to stave off elimination, falling to UCLA to end the season.

=== 1982 AIAW College World Series ===
The 1982 Oklahoma State softball team qualified for both the AIAW Women's College World Series and the NCAA Women's College World Series with a 35–19 record. In Norman for the program's fourth Women's College World Series trip, the Cowgirls cruised through the first three games, notching shutout wins against Western Illinois, Utah and California to earn a spot in the national semifinals. Oklahoma State would then punch their ticket to the national championship series with a one-run victory over Michigan. Facing off in the national championship series against Texas A&M, the Cowgirls needed just one win to claim the national title. Oklahoma State was unable to find it though, falling to the Aggies twice and being forced to settle for a national runner–up finish.

=== 1982 Women's College World Series ===
Just two days after a heartbreaking national runner–up finish in Norman, Oklahoma State competed in the inaugural NCAA Women's College World Series in Omaha. The program's fifth Women's College World Series trip was a short one however, falling in extra inning contests to eventual national champion UCLA and Fresno State to end the season.

=== 1989 Women's College World Series ===
The 1989 Oklahoma State softball team was one of the most dominant in school history, going 46–6 en route to winning both Big Eight regular season and tournament titles. In the Stillwater Regional, the Cowgirls swept Wichita State in two games to punch their sixth trip to the Women's College World Series. In Sunnyvale, Oklahoma State began their tournament with a win over Toledo before picking up another win over Arizona in extra innings. The Cowgirls were unable to find the win column again, dropping a close game to eventual national champion UCLA before being eliminated with a blowout loss to Fresno State.

=== 1990 Women's College World Series ===
The 1990 Oklahoma State softball team went 43–11 and won both Big Eight regular season and tournament titles for the second straight year. The Cowgirls would punch their seventh ticket to the Women's College World Series in Oklahoma City with a win over Adelphi in the Storrs Regional. In the Women's College World Series, the Cowgirls picked up two quick wins over Arizona and Florida State to move into the national semifinals. In a repeat of the previous year, Oklahoma State would again be eliminated from the tournament after a loss to eventual national champion UCLA and then to Fresno State in extra innings.

=== 1993 Women's College World Series ===
The 1993 Oklahoma State softball team went 50–9, becoming the second team in program history to reach 50 wins en route to winning the Big Eight regular season title. The Cowgirls would sweep Utah State in the Stillwater Regional to clinch the eighth Women's College World Series appearance in program history. In Oklahoma City, Oklahoma State began their tournament run with a win over Florida State in the opening game. The Cowgirls would continue with a victory in extra innings over top-seeded UCLA, before falling in extra innings to eventual national champion Arizona. Oklahoma State would then be eliminated after being shutout by UCLA in a rematch.

=== 1994 Women's College World Series ===
The 1994 Oklahoma State softball team went 46–12, winning another Big Eight regular season title with a dominant 15–3 conference record. In the Stillwater Regional, the Cowgirls would win three one-run games over Providence and rival Oklahoma to clinch the program's ninth Women's College World Series appearance. In Oklahoma City, a loss in extra innings to Utah would push Oklahoma State to the edge of elimination. However, the Cowgirls would battle back, grabbing wins over Missouri and Fresno State to make their way back to the national semifinals. Needing two wins against Cal State Northridge to stay alive, Oklahoma State notched a victory in 15 innings before losing a close game to the Matadors, and were eliminated.

=== 1998 Women's College World Series ===
The 1998 Oklahoma State softball team went 42–19 with a 9–7 conference record. The Cowgirls hosted the Stillwater Regional and opened with a pair of shutout victories over Florida State and Missouri State. Oklahoma State would notch their third–straight shutout victory in a win over Stanford, punching their ticket to the Women's College World Series for the 10th time in program history. In Oklahoma City, the Cowgirls opened the tournament with a one-run loss to Arizona to enter the losers bracket. Oklahoma State would stave off elimination twice, blowing out UMass and winning a close game over Michigan to fight their way into the national semifinals. Needing to beat Arizona twice, the Cowgirls failed to win once, being eliminated with a shutout loss to the Wildcats.

=== 2011 Women's College World Series ===
The 2011 Oklahoma State softball team went 42–20 with an 8–10 conference record. In the Knoxville Regional, the Cowgirls began their postseason run with a one-run win over Georgia Tech before knocking off host Tennessee twice to advance to the Stillwater Super Regional. Oklahoma State would defeat Houston in three games to advance to Oklahoma City for the 11th time. In the Women's College World Series, the Cowgirls would lose a one-run contest against Big 12 rival Baylor before being eliminated with a blowout loss to California.

=== 2019 Women's College World Series ===
The 2019 Oklahoma State softball team went 45–17 with a 13–5 conference record. Hosting the Stillwater Regional, the Cowgirls began their tournament with a tight win over BYU before knocking off rival Tulsa twice to advance. In the Tallahassee Super Regional against Florida State, Oklahoma State won an extremely competitive series in three games and advanced to the Women's College World Series for the 12th time in program history. In Oklahoma City, the Cowgirls continued their run with an upset win over Florida before a Bedlam showdown with Oklahoma. The Sooners would cruise to an easy win, and Oklahoma State was later eliminated after a one-run loss to Washington.

=== 2021 Women's College World Series ===
The 2021 Oklahoma State softball team went 48–12 with a 15–3 conference record. Hosting the Stillwater Regional as the 5th seed nationally, the Cowgirls cruised with a dominant win over Campbell and a pair of blowout victories over Mississippi State. In the Stillwater Super Regional, Oklahoma State would outlast Texas in three games to punch their ticket to Oklahoma City for the 13th time. In the Women's College World Series, the Cowgirls began their run with a win over Georgia before suffering a major upset loss at the hands of James Madison. Oklahoma State would lose again in a close game to Florida State, ending their season.

=== 2022 Women's College World Series ===
The 2022 Oklahoma State softball team went 48–14 with a 14–4 conference record, winning the first Big 12 conference tournament title with a victory over Bedlam rival Oklahoma. In the Stillwater Regional, the Cowgirls picked up a blowout win over Fordham before adding a pair of victories over Nebraska and North Texas to advance. In the Stillwater Super Regional, Oklahoma State swept Clemson in two games to advance to the 14th Women's College World Series in program history. In Oklahoma City, the Cowgirls opened with a pair of close wins over Arizona and Florida, moving just one win away from the national championship series. Oklahoma State was unable to find it, falling to Texas twice and being eliminated in heartbreaking fashion.

=== 2023 Women's College World Series ===
The 2023 Oklahoma State softball team went 47–16 with a 10–8 conference record. The Cowgirls opened the Stillwater Regional with a pair of shutout victories over UMBC and Wichita State before defeating Nebraska to advance. In the Stillwater Super Regional, Oklahoma State would demolish Oregon, outscoring them 17–1 over two games and punching their ticket to Oklahoma City for the 15th time. In the Women's College World Series, the Cowgirls suffered a blowout loss to Florida State to enter the losers bracket. Oklahoma State would stave off elimination against Utah in a dominant victory, but would be eliminated after a close loss to Tennessee.

=== 2024 Women's College World Series ===
The 2024 Oklahoma State softball team went 49–12 with a 21–6 conference record. In the Stillwater Regional, the Cowgirls would open with a shutout win over Northern Colorado before adding two comfortable wins over Kentucky and Michigan to advance. In the Stillwater Super Regional, Oklahoma State would once again find complete dominance, cruising by Arizona in two games to reach the program's 16th Women's College World Series. The Cowgirls would struggle to find scoring in Oklahoma City, falling in a pitchers' duel to Florida before being obliterated by Stanford in a shutout loss, ending the season.

=== Coaching history ===
Years	Coach	Record	%
1975–1976	Pauline Winter	27–6	.818
1977	Brenda Johnson	25–13	.658
1978	Paula Jantz	24–16	.600
1979–2001	Sandy Fischer	901–374–3	.706
2002–2006	Margaret Rebenar	151–119	.559
2007–2015	Rich Wieligman	275–227	.548
2016–present	Kenny Gajewski	400–169	.703

=== Current coaching staff ===
Name	Position coached	Consecutive season at Oklahoma State	Consecutive season in current position
Kenny Gajewski	Head coach	9th	9th
Carrie Eberle	Assistant coach / Pitching Coach	1st	1st
Vanessa Shippy-Fletcher	Assistant coach / Recruiting Coordinator	4th	1st
Greg Bergeron	Assistant coach / Defensive Coordinator	1st	1st
Katie Norris	Director of Operations and Player Development	3rd	3rd
Chance Marek	Strength & Conditioning Coach	3rd	3rd
Mike Barlow	Athletic Trainer	2nd	1st
Jesse Martin	Senior Associate AD / External Affairs / Sport Administrator	17th	10th

== Season-by-season results ==
Record
Big Eight (1975–1996)
Year	Head Coach	Overall Record	Conference Record	Conference Standing	Postseason	Final Ranking
1975	Pauline Winter	9–5	–	–	–	–
1976	Pauline Winter	18–1	–	–	–	–
1977	Brenda Johnson	25–13	–	–	AIAW WCWS	–
1978	Paula Jantz	24–16	–	6th	–	–
1979 (Spring)	Sandy Fischer	24–17	–	2nd	–	–
1979 (Fall)	Sandy Fischer	10–6	–	–	–	–
1980 (Spring)	Sandy Fischer	34–20	–	1st	AIAW WCWS	–
1980 (Fall)	Sandy Fischer	16–7	–	–	–	–
1981 (Spring)	Sandy Fischer	40–16	–	1st	AIAW WCWS	–
1981 (Fall)	Sandy Fischer	22–3	–	–	–	–
1982	Sandy Fischer	35–19	2–0	6th	AIAW WCWS Women's College World Series	–
1983	Sandy Fischer	34–13–1	4–2	2nd	–	–
1984	Sandy Fischer	31–11	6–2	2nd	Midwest Regional	–
1985	Sandy Fischer	30–15	6–6	5th	–	–
1986	Sandy Fischer	27–18–1	6–7	4th	–	–
1987	Sandy Fischer	37–16	6–4	5th	–	–
1988	Sandy Fischer	51–9	10–0	2nd	Northeast Regional	–
1989	Sandy Fischer	46–6	10–2	1st	Women's College World Series	2
1990	Sandy Fischer	43–11	5–4	1st	Women's College World Series	6
1991	Sandy Fischer	36–10–1	6–2	1st	Regional No. 1	10
1992	Sandy Fischer	48–14	6–2	1st	Regional No. 6	6
1993	Sandy Fischer	50–9	16–2	1st	Women's College World Series	4
1994	Sandy Fischer	46–12	15–3	1st	Women's College World Series	4
1995	Sandy Fischer	36–16	13–3	1st	Regional No. 7	15
Big 12 (1996–Present)
Year	Head Coach	Overall Record	Conference Record	Conference Standing	Postseason	Final Ranking
1996	Sandy Fischer	37–20	14–5	2nd	Regional No. 8	15
1997	Sandy Fischer	40–22	10–7	5th	Regional No. 7	10
1998	Sandy Fischer	42–19	9–7	5th	Women's College World Series	4
1999	Sandy Fischer	21–24	4–8	8th	–	–
2000	Sandy Fischer	33–22	8–10	5th	–	–
2001	Sandy Fischer	28–23	8–8	5th	–	–
2002	Margaret Rebenar	29–23	8–10	6th	–	–
2003	Margaret Rebenar	39–15	13–5	2nd	Regional No. 6	14
2004	Margaret Rebenar	27–28	7–10	6th	–	–
2005	Margaret Rebenar	35–24	7–11	8th	Tucson Regional	–
2006	Margaret Rebenar	21–29	5–13	9th	–	–
2007	Rich Weiligman	25–33	3–15	9th	–	–
2008	Rich Weiligman	26–25	9–9	5th	–	–
2009	Rich Weiligman	36–22	8–10	7th	Tallahassee Regional	–
2010	Rich Weiligman	44–16	12–6	4th	Tucson Regional	23
2011	Rich Weiligman	42–20	8–10	7th	Women's College World Series	8
2012	Rich Weiligman	25–26	8–16	7th	–	–
2013	Rich Weiligman	30–16	6–12	5th	–	–
2014	Rich Weiligman	26–28	5–13	6th	–	–
2015	Rich Weiligman	21–31	3–13	6th	–	–
2016	Kenny Gajewski	32–26	6–11	5th	Athens Regional	–
2017	Kenny Gajewski	38–25	12–6	3rd	Gainesville Regional	25
2018	Kenny Gajewski	39–22	12–6	2nd	Fayetteville Regional	–
2019	Kenny Gajewski	45–17	13–5	2nd	Women's College World Series	6
2020	Kenny Gajewski	19–5	–	–	Canceled due to the COVID-19 pandemic	12
2021	Kenny Gajewski	48–12	15–3	2nd	Women's College World Series	6
2022	Kenny Gajewski	48–14	14–4	2nd	Women's College World Series	4
2023	Kenny Gajewski	47–16	10–8	3rd	Women's College World Series	6
2024	Kenny Gajewski	49–12	21–6	3rd	Women's College World Series	7
2025	Kenny Gajewski	35–20	13–9	4th	Fayetteville Regional	25
2026	Kenny Gajewski	41–17	16–8	2nd	Lincoln Super Regional	14
Total	–	1,757-915-3	363–290	–	–	–

=== NCAA Tournament seeding history ===
National seeding began in 2005. The Oklahoma State Cowgirls have been a national seed six times.

Years →	'19	'21	'22	'23	'24	'26
Seeds →	13	5	7	6	5	13

== Championships ==
=== Conference championships ===
Season	Conference	Record	Head coach
1980	Big Eight Conference	—	Sandy Fischer
1981	Big Eight Conference	—	Sandy Fischer
1989	Big Eight Conference	10–2	Sandy Fischer
1990	Big Eight Conference	5–4	Sandy Fischer
1991	Big Eight Conference	6–2	Sandy Fischer
1992	Big Eight Conference	6–2	Sandy Fischer
1993	Big Eight Conference	16–2	Sandy Fischer
1994	Big Eight Conference	15–3	Sandy Fischer
1995	Big Eight Conference	13–3	Sandy Fischer

=== Conference tournament championships ===
Year	Conference	Tournament Location	Head coach
1980	Big Eight Conference	Columbia, MO	Sandy Fischer
1981	Big Eight Conference	Stillwater, OK	Sandy Fischer
1989	Big Eight Conference	Oklahoma City, OK	Sandy Fischer
1990	Big Eight Conference	Oklahoma City, OK	Sandy Fischer
1991	Big Eight Conference	Oklahoma City, OK	Sandy Fischer
1992	Big Eight Conference	Oklahoma City, OK	Sandy Fischer
2022	Big 12 Conference	Oklahoma City, OK	Kenny Gajewski

== Notable players ==
=== Conference awards ===
Big 12 Player of the Year

- Lauren Bay, 2003
- Vanessa Shippy, 2016, 2018

Big 12 Pitcher of the Year

- Carrie Eberle, 2021
- Kelly Maxwell, 2022
- Lexi Kilfoyl, 2024

Big 12 Freshman of the Year

- Jaime Foutch, 1996

Big 12 Newcomer of the Year

- Leanne Tyler, 1996
- Shelly Graham, 1999

Big 12 Scholar-Athlete of the Year

- Vanessa Shippy, 2017, 2018
