= List of California Golden Bears softball seasons =

The following is a list of California Golden Bears softball seasons. The University of California, Berkeley is a member of the Atlantic Coast Conference of the NCAA Division I. The Golden Bears have won seven conference championships, appeared in the NCAA Division I softball tournament 32 times, and in the Women's College World Series 15 times, including three under the authority of the AIAW. The Bears won the National Championship in 2002, and appeared in the finals twice more.

National champions	WCWS Appearance	NCAA Tournament appearance	Conference champions

Season	Head coach	Conference	Season results									Postseason result
Season	Head coach	Conference	Overall				Conference					Postseason result
Season	Head coach	Conference	Wins	Losses	Ties	%	Wins	Losses	Ties	%	Finish	Postseason result
1972	Debbie Gebhardt	Independent	2	4	0	.333	N/A					—
1973	Debbie Gebhardt	NCIAC	2	4	0	.333	Not available				4th	—
1974	Coni Staff	NCIAC	5	4	0	.556	Not available				5th	—
1975	Coni Staff	NCIAC	4	3	0	.571	Not available				3rd	—
1976	Myrtle Baker	NCIAC	9	6	0	.600	Not available				3rd	—
1977	Myrtle Baker	NorCal	12	9	0	.571	5	3	0	.625	4th	
1978	Bonnie Johnson	NorCal	19	19	1	.500	Not available				2nd	—
1979	Bonnie Johnson	NorCal	37	9	0	.804	Not available				1st	—
1980	Bonnie Johnson	NorCal	46	11	0	.807	Not available				1st	Women's College World Series
1981	Bonnie Johnson	NorCal	47	13	0	.783	Not available				1st	Women's College World Series
1982	Bonnie Johnson	NorCal	37	17	1	.682	Not available				2nd	AIAW Women's College World Series
1983	Donna Terry	NorPac	26	21	0	.553	6	6	0	.500	4th	—
1984	Donna Terry	NorPac	27	19	1	.585	8	4	0	.667	3rd	—
1985	Donna Terry	NorPac	35	25	0	.583	6	4	0	.600	4th	—
1986	Donna Terry	NorPac	43	17	0	.717	8	2	0	.800	T-1st	Women's College World Series
1987	Donna Terry	Pac-12	34	15	0	.694	8	2	0	.800	1st	NCAA Regional
1988	Diane Ninemire	Pac-12	39	24	0	.619	7	11	0	.389	5th	NCAA Regional
1989	Diane Ninemire	Pac-12	38	26	0	.594	10	10	0	.500	4th	NCAA Regional
1990	Diane Ninemire	Pac-12	41	28	0	.594	9	9	0	.500	T-3rd	NCAA Regional
1991	Diane Ninemire	Pac-12	48	20	0	.706	14	6	0	.700	3rd	NCAA Regional
1992	Diane Ninemire	Pac-12	47	16	0	.746	8	8	0	.500	3rd	Women's College World Series
1993	Diane Ninemire	Pac-12	37	20	0	.649	12	10	0	.545	3rd	NCAA Regional
1994	Diane Ninemire	Pac-12	40	21	0	.656	10	12	0	.455	5th	NCAA Regional
1995	Diane Ninemire	Pac-12	41	21	0	.661	20	8	0	.714	3rd	NCAA Regional
1996	Diane Ninemire	Pac-12	41	23	0	.641	14	12	0	.538	4th	Women's College World Series
1997	Diane Ninemire	Pac-12	36	26	0	.581	13	14	0	.481	4th	NCAA Regional
1998	Diane Ninemire	Pac-12	35	27	0	.565	12	14	0	.462	4th	NCAA Regional
1999	Diane Ninemire	Pac-12	51	22	0	.699	13	14	0	.481	5th	Women's College World Series
2000	Diane Ninemire	Pac-12	49	25	0	.662	6	15	0	.286	T-7th	Women's College World Series
2001	Diane Ninemire	Pac-12	54	18	0	.750	6	14	0	.300	7th	Women's College World Series
2002	Diane Ninemire	Pac-12	56	19	0	.747	12	9	0	.571	4th	National Champions
2003	Diane Ninemire	Pac-12	49	20	0	.710	10	11	0	.476	3rd	Women's College World Series Runners-up
2004	Diane Ninemire	Pac-12	53	13	0	.803	13	8	0	.619	T-2nd	Women's College World Series Runners-up
2005	Diane Ninemire	Pac-12	52	15	0	.776	13	8	0	.619	T-1st	Women's College World Series
2006	Diane Ninemire	Pac-12	48	14	0	.774	12	9	0	.571	3rd	NCAA Regional
2007	Diane Ninemire	Pac-12	34	32	0	.515	7	14	0	.333	8th	NCAA Regional
2008	Diane Ninemire	Pac-12	43	27	0	.614	7	14	0	.333	5th	NCAA Regional
2009	Diane Ninemire	Pac-12	38	20	0	.655	10	10	0	.500	5th	NCAA Regional
2010	Diane Ninemire	Pac-12	44	17	0	.721	10	11	0	.476	4th	NCAA Regional
2011	Diane Ninemire	Pac-12	45	13	0	.776	15	6	0	.714	2nd	Women's College World Series
2012	Diane Ninemire	Pac-12	58	7	0	.892	21	2	0	.913	1st	Women's College World Series
2013	Diane Ninemire	Pac-12	38	19	0	.667	10	14	0	.417	T-5th	NCAA Regional
2014	Diane Ninemire	Pac-12	23	29	0	.442	4	18	0	.182	9th	—
2015	Diane Ninemire	Pac-12	39	18	0	.684	10	14	0	.417	7th	NCAA Regional
2016	Diane Ninemire	Pac-12	33	24	1	.578	11	11	1	.500	6th	NCAA Regional
2017	Diane Ninemire	Pac-12	32	24	0	.571	6	17	0	.261	8th	NCAA Regional
2018	Diane Ninemire	Pac-12	35	21	0	.625	7	16	0	.304	7th	NCAA Regional
2019	Diane Ninemire	Pac-12	28	27	0	.509	5	11	0	.313	8th	—
2020	Diane Ninemire/Tammy Lohmann	Pac-12	13	11	0	.542	Season cancelled due to COVID-19					
2021	Chelsea Spencer	Pac-12	17	20	0	.459	3	11	0	.214	8th	—
2022	Chelsea Spencer	Pac-12	28	27	1	.509	8	16	0	.333	T-8th	—
2023	Chelsea Spencer	Pac-12	35	21	1	.623	9	14	1	.396	6th	NCAA Regional
2024	Chelsea Spencer	Pac-12	37	19	0	.661	9	13	0	.409	7th	NCAA Regional
2025	Chelsea Spencer	ACC	37	21	0	.638	11	19	0	.367	9th	NCAA Regional
2026	Steve Singleton	ACC	15	37	0	.288	5	19	0	.208	13th	—
