= List of California Golden Bears head softball coaches =

The California Golden Bears softball program is a college softball team that represents the University of California, Berkeley in the Pac-12 Conference in the National Collegiate Athletic Association. The team has had six head coaches since it started playing organized softball in the 1972 season.

== Key ==
General
#	Number of coaches (Note: A running total of the number of head coaches.)
GC	Games coached

Overall
OW	Wins
OL	Losses
OT	Ties
O%	Winning percentage

Conference (Note: Cal played as an independent in their first season before joining the NCIAC from 1973 to 1976. They then were members of the Northern California Athletic Conference from 1977 through 1982 and the Northern Pacific Conference from 1983 to 1986. The Pac-12 Conference, then known as the Pac-10, began sponsoring women's sports in 1987. They joined the ACC in 2025.)
CW	Wins
CL	Losses
CT	Ties
C%	Winning percentage

Postseason (Note: Postseason play involving the NCAA Division I Softball Championship or AIAW Women's College World Series.)
PA	Total Appearances (Note: Postseason appearances include seasons with NCAA Division I Softball Championship bids since the tournament began in 1982.)
PW	Total Wins
PL	Total Losses
WA	Women's College World Series appearances (Note: Women's College World Series appearances include seasons with WCWS bids since the tournament began in 1969.)
WW	Women's College World Series wins
WL	Women's College World Series losses

Championships
CC	Conference regular season
NC	National championships (Note: Women's College World Series sponsored by either the AIAW or NCAA.)

== Coaches ==
List of head softball coaches showing season(s) coached, overall records, conference records, postseason records, championships and selected awards (Note: Statistics correct as of the end of the 2021 NCAA Division I softball season.)
#	Name	Term	GC	OW	OL	OT	O%	CW	CL	CT	C%	PA	WA	CCs	NCs
1	Debbie Gebhardt	1972–1973	12	4	8	0	.333	Not Available				—	0	0	0
2	Coni Staff	1974–1975	16	9	7	0	.563	Not Available				—	0	0	0
3	Myrtle Baker	1976–1977	36	21	15	0	.583	5	3	0	.625 (Note: Only one season of conference records are available)	—	0	0	0
4	Bonnie Johnson	1978–1982	256	185	69	2	.727	Not Available				—	3	3	0
5	Donna Terry	1983–1987	264	168	95	1	.638	36	18	0	.667	2	1	1	0
6	Diane Ninemire	1988–2020	2,043	1,355	687	1	.663	337	367	1	.479	30	11	1	1
7	Tammy Lohmann (Interim)	2020	24	13	11	0	.542	0	0	0	.000	—	—	—	—
8	Chelsea Spencer	2021–present	264	154	108	2	.587	40	67	1	.375	3	0	0	0
