= 2002 NCAA Division I softball rankings =

2002 NCAA Division I softball season
- Defending Champions: Arizona

Tournament

Women's College World Series
- Champions: California (1st title)
- Runners-up: Arizona (15th WCWS Appearance)
- Winning Coach: Diane Ninemire (1st title)
- WCWS MOP: Jocelyn Forest (California)

Seasons
- ← 2001 2003 →

The following human polls make up the 2002 NCAA Division I women's softball rankings. The NFCA/USA Today Poll is voted on by a panel of 32 Division I softball coaches and ranks to top 25 teams nationally.

== Legend ==
	Increase in ranking
	Decrease in ranking
	Not ranked previous week
Italics	Number of first place votes
(#–#)	Win-loss record
т	Tied with team above or below also with this symbol

== NFCA/USA Today ==
	Week 0 Pre	Week 1	Week 2	Week 3	Week 4	Week 5	Week 6	Week 7	Week 8	Week 9	Week 10	Week 11	Week 12	Week Final	
1.	Arizona (20)	UCLA (24)	UCLA (27)	UCLA (22)	UCLA	UCLA (27)	UCLA (26)	UCLA (16)	Arizona (22)	Arizona (26)	UCLA (25)	UCLA (27)	UCLA (23)	California (27)	1.
2.	UCLA (7)	Stanford (1)	Arizona	Arizona (5)	Airzona	Stanford	Arizona (1)	Arizona (11)	UCLA (5)	UCLA (1)	Arizona (2)	Arizona	Arizona (4)	Arizona	2.
3.	Stanford	Arizona (2)	Stanford	Stanford	Stanford	Arizona	Stanford	Stanford	Stanford	Stanford	LSU	LSU	LSU	Arizona State	3.
4.	LSU	Oklahoma	Nebraska	LSU	LSU	Nebraska	Nebraska	Nebraska	Nebraska	Nebraska	Nebraska	Arizona State	Arizona State	Florida State	4.
5.	California	LSU	LSU	Nebraska	Nebraska	LSU	LSU	LSU	LSU	LSU	Arizona State	California	California	UCLA	5.
6.	Iowa	Washington	California	California	Oklahoma	Arizona State	Arizona State	California	Arizona State	Arizona State	California	Washington	Washington	Nebraska	6.
7.	Oklahoma	California	Oklahoma	Arizona State	California	Cal State Fullerton	Cal State Fullerton	Cal State Fullerton	Cal State Fullerton	Cal State Fullerton	Stanford	Nebraska	Nebraska	Michigan	7.
8.	Arizona State	Arizona State	Michigan	Michigan	Arizona State	California	California	Arizona State	California	California	Washington	Stanford	Stanford	Oklahoma	8.
9.	Washington	Nebraska	Arizona State	Oklahoma	Cal State Fullerton	Oklahoma	Oklahoma	Oklahoma	Oklahoma	Washington	Cal State Fullerton	Cal State Fullerton	Cal State Fullerton	LSU	9.
10.	Cal State Fullerton	Michigan	Pacific	Fresno State	Fresno State	Fresno State	Florida Atlantic	Washington	Washington	Florida Atlantic	Florida Atlantic	Florida Atlantic	Texas	Cal State Fullerton	10.
11.	Michigan	Oregon State	Oregon State	Cal State Fullerton	Florida Atlantic	Florida Atlantic	Fresno State	Florida Atlantic	Florida Atlantic	Oklahoma	Michigan	Michigan	Michigan	DePaul	11.
12.	Nebraska	Pacific	Washington	Washington	Michigan	Washington	Washington	Fresno State	Fresno State	Michigan	Oklahoma	Oklahoma	Florida Atlantic	South Carolina	12.
13.	Alabama	Fresno State	Fresno State	Florida Atlantic	Washington	Michigan	Michigan	Michigan	Michigan	Fresno State	Fresno State	Texas	Oklahoma	Ohio State	13.
14.	Notre Dame	Cal State Fullerton	Alabama	Oregon State	DePaul	Iowa	Oregon State	Oregon State	Oregon State	Oregon State	Texas	Fresno State	Fresno State	Washington	14.
15.	Florida State	DePaul	DePaul	DePaul	Oregon State	Oregon State	Alabama	Alabama	Alabama	Alabama	Alabama	Alabama	Oregon State	Stanford	15.
16.	Fresno State	Iowa	Iowa	Alabama	Iowa	DePaul	DePaul	DePaul	DePaul	Texas	Oregon State	Oregon State	DePaul	Texas	16.
17.	Texas State	Florida State	Cal State Fullerton	Iowa	Alabama	Alabama	Louisiana–Lafayette	Louisiana–Lafayette	Pacific	DePaul	Pacific	Pacific	Pacific	Fresno State	17.
18.	Oregon State	Alabama	Florida State	Pacific	Louisiana–Lafayette	Louisiana–Lafayette	Pacific	Pacific	Texas	Pacific	DePaul	DePaul	Alabama	Georgia Tech	18.
19.	DePaul т	Notre Dame	Louisiana–Lafayette	Louisiana–Lafayette	Pacific	Pacific	Iowa	Iowa	Louisiana–Lafayette	Louisiana–Lafayette	Louisiana–Lafayette	Ohio State	Louisiana–Lafayette	Notre Dame	19.
20.	Pacific т	South Carolina	Florida Atlantic	Georgia	Texas A&M	Florida State	Florida State	Texas	Iowa	Florida State	Ohio State	Louisiana–Lafayette	Ohio State	Pacific	20.
21.	Louisiana–Lafayette	Florida Atlantic	Georgia	Texas A&M	Georgia	Georgia	Georgia	Florida State	Florida State	Iowa	Florida State	Florida State	Florida State	Texas A&M	21.
22.	South Carolina	Louisiana–Lafayette	Mississippi State	Florida State	Florida State	Texas A&M	Texas A&M	Texas A&M	Baylor	Ohio State	Baylor	Iowa	Iowa	Georgia	22.
23.	San Diego State	Georgia	Texas A&M	Mississippi State	Minnesota	Minnesota	Texas	Georgia	Georgia	Baylor	Iowa	Baylor	Texas A&M	UMass	23.
24.	UMass	Mississippi State	Notre Dame	South Carolina	South Carolina	South Carolina	Minnesota	Baylor	Texas A&M	Texas A&M	Texas A&M	Texas A&M	Baylor	Oregon State	24.
25.	South Florida	UMass	South Carolina	Wisconsin	Oklahoma State т Wisconsin т	Wisconsin	Ohio State	Minnesota	Ohio State	Georgia	Georgia	Georgia	Georgia	Florida Atlantic	25.
	Week 0 Pre	Week 1	Week 2	Week 3	Week 4	Week 5	Week 6	Week 7	Week 8	Week 9	Week 10	Week 11	Week 12	Week Final	
		Dropped: 17 Texas State; 23. San Diego State; 25. South Florida	Dropped: 25. UMass	Dropped: 24. Notre Dame	Dropped: 23. Mississippi State	Dropped: 25. Oklahoma State	Dropped: 24. South Carolina; 25. Wisconsin	Dropped: 25. Ohio State	Dropped: 25. Minnesota	None	None	None	None	Dropped: 18. Alabama; 19. Louisiana–Lafayette; 22. Iowa; 24. Baylor	
