= 2002 California Golden Bears softball team =

American college softball season

2002 California Golden Bears softball

National Champion NCAA Fresno Regional champion
- Conference: Pacific-10 Conference
- Record: 56–19 (12–9 Pac-10)
- Head coach: Diane Ninemire (15th season)
- Home stadium: Levine-Fricke Field

2002 Pacific-10 Conference softball standings
	Conf.				Overall
Team	W		L	PCT	W		L	PCT
No. 5 UCLA ‍†‍‍^{y}	18	–	3	.857	55	–	9	.859
No. 2 Arizona ‍‍‍^{y}	15	–	6	.714	55	–	12	.821
No. 14 Washington ‍‍‍^{y}	13	–	8	.619	46	–	18	.719
No. 1 California ‍‍‍^{y}	12	–	9	.571	56	–	19	.747
No. 3 Arizona State ‍‍‍^{y}	10	–	11	.476	46	–	20	.697
No. 15 Stanford ‍‍‍^{y}	7	–	14	.333	44	–	20	.688
No. 24 Oregon State ‍‍‍^{y}	7	–	14	.333	40	–	25	.615
Oregon ‍‍‍	2	–	19	.095	24	–	30	.444
† – Conference champion y – Invited to the NCAA tournament As of June 30, 2002; Rankings from NFCA/USA Today

The 2002 California Golden Bears softball team represented the University of California, Berkeley in the 2002 NCAA Division I softball season. The Golden Bears were coached by Diane Ninemire, who led her fifteenth season. The Golden Bears finished with a record of 56–19. They played their home games at Levine-Fricke Field and competed in the Pacific-10 Conference, where they finished fourth with a 12–9 record.

The Golden Bears were invited to the 2002 NCAA Division I softball tournament, where they swept the West Regional and then completed a run through the Women's College World Series to claim their first NCAA Women's College World Series Championship.

== Roster ==
2002 California Golden Bears roster
Pitchers: Kelly Anderson; Cassie Bobrow; Jen Deering; Jocelyn Forest – senior; Catchers: Courtney Scott	Infielders: 4 – Candace Harper – senior; Veronica Nelson; Jessica Pamanian; Chelsea Spencer – freshman; Jessica Vernaglia	Outfielders: Kristen Bayless; Kaleo Eldredge; Kristen Morley; Roni Rodrigues; Unknown: LeAnna Hoglen; Eryn Manahan; Mikella Pedretti; Jennifer Reichhoff

== Schedule ==
Legend
	California win
	California loss
*	Non-Conference game

2002 California Golden Bears softball game log
Regular season

February
Date	Opponent	Rank	Site/stadium	Score	Overall record	Pac-10 record
Feb 2	Sacramento State*	No. 5	Levine-Fricke Field • Berkeley, CA	W 3–2	1–0	
Feb 2	Sacramento State*	No. 5	Levine-Fricke Field • Berkeley, CA	W 4–0	2–0	
Feb 3	at Pacific*	No. 5	Stockton, CA	L 0–4	2–1	
Feb 8	vs Fresno State*	No. 5	Alberta B. Farrington Softball Stadium • Tempe, AZ	L 0–1	2–2	
Feb 8	vs Kansas*	No. 5	Alberta B. Farrington Softball Stadium • Tempe, AZ	W 6–2	3–2	
Feb 9	vs Texas*	No. 5	Alberta B. Farrington Softball Stadium • Tempe, AZ	L 1–2	3–3	
Feb 9	vs UNLV*	No. 5	Alberta B. Farrington Softball Stadium • Tempe, AZ	W 5–0	4–3	
Feb 10	vs Southwest Texas State*	No. 5	Alberta B. Farrington Softball Stadium • Tempe, AZ	L 2–3	4–4	
Feb 15	vs BYU*	No. 7	Eller Media Stadium • Paradise, NV	W 5–2	5–4	
Feb 15	vs UC Riverside*	No. 7	Eller Media Stadium • Paradise, NV	W 3–0	6–4	
Feb 16	vs Kent State*	No. 7	Eller Media Stadium • Paradise, NV	W 10–2	7–4	
Feb 16	vs No. 5 LSU*	No. 7	Eller Media Stadium • Paradise, NV	W 3–0	8–4	
Feb 17	vs Portland State*	No. 7	Eller Media Stadium • Paradise, NV	W 8–0	9–4	
Feb 17	vs Kansas*	No. 7	Eller Media Stadium • Paradise, NV	W 8–4	10–4	
Feb 22	vs Santa Clara*	No. 6	Santa Barbara, CA	W 7–2	11–4	
Feb 22	vs BYU*	No. 6	Santa Barbara, CA	W 1–0	12–4	
Feb 23	at UC Santa Barbara*	No. 6	Santa Barbara, CA	W 3–1	13–4	
Feb 23	vs Cal Poly*	No. 6	Santa Barbara, CA	W 4–1	14–4	
Feb 24	vs Illinois*	No. 6	Santa Barbara, CA	W 8–0	15–4	

March
Date	Opponent	Rank	Site/stadium	Score	Overall record	Pac-10 record
Mar 1	vs Oklahoma State*	No. 6	Anderson Family Field • Fullerton, CA	L 0–1	15–5	
Mar 1	vs San Diego State*	No. 6	Anderson Family Field • Fullerton, CA	W 5–4	16–5	
Mar 2	vs Ohio State*	No. 6	Anderson Family Field • Fullerton, CA	W 4–0	17–5	
Mar 2	at Cal State Fullerton*	No. 6	Anderson Family Field • Fullerton, CA	L 1–2	17–6	
Mar 3	vs Minnesota*	No. 6	Anderson Family Field • Fullerton, CA	W 2–1	18–6	
Mar 3	vs Portland State*	No. 6	Anderson Family Field • Fullerton, CA	W 9–1	19–6	
Mar 8	vs Miami (OH)*	No. 7	Pleasanton, CA	W 12–1	20–6	
Mar 8	vs Santa Clara*	No. 7	Pleasanton, CA	W 6–3	21–6	
Mar 8	vs Virginia*	No. 7	Pleasanton, CA	W 7–1	22–6	
Mar 9	vs No. 17 Iowa*	No. 7	Pleasanton, CA	L 1–4	22–7	
Mar 9	vs Northern Iowa*	No. 7	Pleasanton, CA	W 6–1	23–7	
Mar 9	vs Long Beach State*	No. 7	Pleasanton, CA	L 0–1	23–8	
Mar 14	vs San Jose State*	No. 8	Shea Stadium • Sacramento, CA	W 6–1	24–8	
Mar 14	vs Miami (OH)*	No. 8	Shea Stadium • Sacramento, CA	W 9–0	25–8	
Mar 15	vs Kansas*	No. 8	Shea Stadium • Sacramento, CA	W 1–0	26–8	
Mar 15	vs Syracuse*	No. 8	Shea Stadium • Sacramento, CA	W 8–0	27–8	
Mar 16	at Sacramento State*	No. 8	Shea Stadium • Sacramento, CA	W 6–2	28–8	
Mar 17	vs Wisconsin*	No. 8	Shea Stadium • Sacramento, CA	W 1–0	29–8	
Mar 17	vs Nebraska*	No. 8	Shea Stadium • Sacramento, CA	L 3–4	29–9	
Mar 21	at Hawaii*	No. 8	Rainbow Wahine Softball Stadium • Honlulu, HI	W 4–0	30–9	
Mar 22	vs Hofstra*	No. 8	Rainbow Wahine Softball Stadium • Honolulu, HI	W 4–2	31–9	
Mar 23	vs Northwestern*	No. 8	Rainbow Wahine Softball Stadium • Honolulu, HI	L 0–1	31–10	
Mar 24	vs Hofstra*	No. 8	Rainbow Wahine Softball Stadium • Honolulu, HI	W 15–2	32–10	
Mar 24	vs Northwestern*	No. 8	Rainbow Wahine Softball Stadium • Honolulu, HI	W 9–0	33–10	
Mar 29	No. 3 Stanford	No. 6	W 3–2	34–10	1–0	
Mar 30	at No. 3 Stanford	No. 6	Boyd & Jill Smith Family Stadium • Stanford, CA	L 0–6	34–11	1–1
Mar 31	at No. 3 Stanford	No. 6	Boyd & Jill Smith Family Stadium • Stanford, CA	W 7–6	35–11	2–1

April
Date	Opponent	Rank	Site/stadium	Score	Overall record	Pac-10 record
Apr 5	No. 14 Oregon State	No. 8	Levine-Fricke Field • Berkeley, CA	L 3–2	35–12	2–2
Apr 6	Oregon	No. 8	Levine-Fricke Field • Berkeley, CA	W 3–2	36–12	3–2
Apr 7	Oregon	No. 8	Levine-Fricke Field • Berkeley, CA	W 7–0	37–12	4–2
Apr 10	San Jose State*	No. 8	Levine-Fricke Field • Berkeley, CA	W 7–0	38–12	
Apr 12	at No. 10 Washington	No. 8	Husky Softball Stadium • Seattle, WA	W 4–1	39–12	5–2
Apr 13	at No. 2 UCLA	No. 8	Easton Stadium • Los Angeles, CA	L 0–3	39–13	5–3
Apr 14	at No. 2 UCLA	No. 8	Easton Stadium • Los Angeles, CA	L 0–1	39–14	5–4
Apr 19	No. 5 Arizona State	No. 6	Levine-Fricke Field • Berkeley, CA	W 3–2	40–14	6–4
Apr 20	No. 2 Arizona	No. 6	Levine-Fricke Field • Berkeley, CA	W 5–2	41–14	7–4
Apr 21	No. 2 Arizona	No. 6	Levine-Fricke Field • Berkeley, CA	W 2–1	42–14	8–4
Apr 24	at Saint Mary's*	No. 5	Moraga, CA	W 3–0	43–14	
Apr 24	at Saint Mary's*	No. 5	Moraga, CA	W 4–0	44–14	
Apr 26	No. 1 UCLA	No. 5	Levine-Fricke Field • Berkeley, CA	L 0–3	44–15	8–5
Apr 27	No. 6 Washington	No. 5	Levine-Fricke Field • Berkeley, CA	L 3–6	44–16	8–6
Apr 28	No. 6 Washington	No. 5	Levine-Fricke Field • Berkeley, CA	W 3–2	45–16	9–6

May
Date	Opponent	Rank	Site/stadium	Score	Overall record	Pac-10 record
May 3	at No. 2 Arizona	No. 5	Rita Hillenbrand Memorial Stadium • Tucson, AZ	L 0–3	45–17	9–7
May 4	at No. 4 Arizona State	No. 5	Alberta B. Farrington Softball Stadium • Tempe, AZ	L 4–8	45–18	9–8
May 5	at No. 4 Arizona State	No. 5	Alberta B. Farrington Softball Stadium • Tempe, AZ	L 1–2	45–19	9–9
May 10	Oregon	No. 5	Levine-Fricke Field • Berkeley, CA	W 3–2	46–19	10–9
May 11	No. 15 Oregon State	No. 5	Levine-Fricke Field • Berkeley, CA	W 6–1	47–19	11–9
May 11	No. 15 Oregon State	No. 5	Levine-Fricke Field • Berkeley, CA	W 10–7	48–19	12–9

Postseason

NCAA Fresno Regional
Date	Opponent	Rank	Site/stadium	Score	Overall record	NCAAT record
May 16	No. 14 Fresno State	No. 5	Bulldog Diamond • Fresno, CA	W 4–2	49–19	1–0
May 17	No. 8 Stanford	No. 5	Bulldog Diamond • Fresno, CA	W 8–0^{6}	50–19	2–0
May 18	No. 9 Cal State Fullerton	No. 5	Bulldog Diamond • Fresno, CA	W 5–4	51–19	3–0
May 19	No. 9 Cal State Fullerton	No. 5	Bulldog Diamond • Fresno, CA	W 6–2	52–19	4–0

NCAA Women's College World Series
Date	Opponent	Rank (Seed)	Site/stadium	Score	Overall record	WCWS record
May 24	No. 13 (5) Oklahoma	No. 5 (4)	ASA Hall of Fame Stadium • Oklahoma City, OK	W 3–2	53–19	1–0
May 25	No. 21 (8) Florida State	No. 5 (4)	ASA Hall of Fame Stadium • Oklahoma City, OK	W 5–4	54–19	2–0
May 27	No. 4 (3) Arizona State	No. 5 (4)	ASA Hall of Fame Stadium • Oklahoma City, OK	W 1–0	55–19	3–0
May 28	No. 2 (2) Arizona	No. 5 (4)	ASA Hall of Fame Stadium • Oklahoma City, OK	W 1–0	56–19	4–0

== Ranking movements ==
Ranking movements Legend: ██ Increase in ranking ██ Decrease in ranking
	Week													
Poll	Pre	1	2	3	4	5	6	7	8	9	10	11	12	Final
NFCA/USA Today	5	7	6	6	7	8	8	6	8	8	6	5	5	1
