= 2002 Big 12 Conference softball tournament =

- Teams: 10
- Finals site: ASA Hall of Fame Stadium; Oklahoma City, OK
- Champions: Texas (2nd title)
- Runner-up: Nebraska (3rd title game)
- Winning coach: Connie Clark (2nd title)
- MVP: Cat Osterman (Texas)
- Attendance: 5,500

2002 Big 12 Conference softball standings
	Conf.				Overall
Team	W		L	PCT	W		L	PCT
No. 16 Texas ‍†‍‡‍^{y}	17	–	1	.944	50	–	13	.794
No. 8 Oklahoma ‍‍‍^{y}	14	–	2	.875	49	–	16	.754
No. 6 Nebraska ‍‍‍^{y}	11	–	5	.688	50	–	14	.781
Baylor ‍‍‍	10	–	8	.556	46	–	18	.719
No. 21 Texas A&M ‍‍‍^{y}	9	–	9	.500	40	–	18	.690
Oklahoma State ‍‍‍	8	–	10	.444	29	–	22	.569
Kansas ‍‍‍	7	–	11	.389	33	–	25	.569
Iowa State ‍‍‍	6	–	12	.333	19	–	25	.432
Missouri ‍‍‍	4	–	14	.222	29	–	33	.468
Texas Tech ‍‍‍	2	–	16	.111	13	–	40	.245
† – Conference champion ‡ – Tournament champion y – Invited to the NCAA tournament Rankings from NFCA/USA Today

The 2002 Big 12 Conference softball tournament was held at ASA Hall of Fame Stadium in Oklahoma City, OK from May 2 through May 5, 2002. Texas won their second conference tournament and earned the Big 12 Conference's automatic bid to the 2002 NCAA Division I softball tournament.

Texas, Oklahoma, Nebraska and Texas A&M received bids to the NCAA tournament. Oklahoma and Nebraska would go on to play in the 2002 Women's College World Series.

== Standings ==
Place	Seed	Team	Conference			Overall		
Place	Seed	Team	W	L	%	W	L	%
1	1	Texas	17	1	.944	50	13	.794
2	2	Oklahoma	14	2	.875	49	16	.754
3	3	Nebraska	11	5	.688	50	14	.781
4	4	Baylor	10	8	.556	46	18	.719
5	5	Texas A&M	9	9	.500	40	18	.690
6	6	Oklahoma State	8	10	.444	29	22	.569
7	7	Kansas	7	11	.389	33	25	.569
8	8	Iowa State	6	12	.333	19	25	.432
9	9	Missouri	4	14	.222	29	33	.468
10	10	Texas Tech	2	16	.111	13	40	.245

== Schedule ==
Game	Time	Matchup	Location	Attendance
Day 1 – Thursday, May 2
1	5:00 p.m.	#8 Iowa State 1, #9 Missouri 0	Hall of Fame Stadium	
2	5:00 p.m.	#7 Kansas 2, #10 Texas Tech 1	Field 2	
3	7:30 p.m.	#1 Texas 8, #8 Iowa State 0 (5)	Hall of Fame Stadium	
4	7:30 p.m.	#7 Kansas 3, #2 Oklahoma 1	Field 2	
Day 2 – Friday, May 3
5	11:00 a.m.	#5 Texas A&M 5, #4 Baylor 1	Hall of Fame Stadium	1,358
6	11:00 a.m.	#3 Nebraska 2, #6 Oklahoma State 0	Field 2	1,358
7	1:53 a.m.	#2 Oklahoma 5, #8 Iowa State 1	Hall of Fame Stadium	1,358
8	3:30 p.m.	#4 Baylor 4, #6 Oklahoma State 0	Hall of Fame Stadium	1,358
9	5:00 p.m.	#1 Texas 2, #5 Texas A&M 1 (8)	Hall of Fame Stadium	1,358
10	8:05 p.m.	#3 Nebraska 7, #7 Kansas 5	Hall of Fame Stadium	1,358
Day 3 – Saturday, May 4
11	11:00 a.m.	#2 Oklahoma 10, #7 Kansas 0 (5)	Hall of Fame Stadium	1,477
12	1:27 p.m.	#5 Texas A&M 1, #4 Baylor 0	Hall of Fame Stadium	1,477
13	5:04 p.m.	#3 Nebraska 6, #5 Texas A&M 2	Hall of Fame Stadium	1,477
14	7:47 p.m.	#2 Oklahoma 4, #1 Texas 0	Hall of Fame Stadium	1,477
Day 4 – Sunday, May 5
15	10:00 a.m.	#1 Texas 2, #2 Oklahoma 0	Hall of Fame Stadium	969
16	2:36 p.m.	#1 Texas 1, #3 Nebraska 0	Hall of Fame Stadium	977
Game times in CDT. Rankings denote tournament seed.

== All-Tournament Team ==
Position	Player	School
MOP	Cat Osterman	Texas
1B/OF	Nicole Trimboli	Nebraska
2B	Lindsay Gardner	Texas
SS	Amanda Buchholz	Nebraska
IF	Kelli Braitsch	Oklahoma
C	Marlo Hanks	Texas
CF	Shelly Musser	Kansas
OF	Sarah Caudle	Baylor
OF/P	Lisa Wangler	Nebraska
OF	Cheryl Fowler	Texas A&M
P	Cat Osterman	Texas
P/1B	Peaches James	Nebraska
P/DP	Kami Keiter	Oklahoma
