= 1992 Arizona Wildcats softball team =

American college softball season

1992 Arizona Wildcats softball

Pac-10 champion NCAA Regional champion

Women's College World Series, runner-up
- Conference: Pacific-10 Conference
- Record: 58–7 (16–2 Pac-10)
- Head coach: Mike Candrea (7th season)

1992 Pacific-10 Conference softball standings
	Conf.				Overall
Team	W		L	PCT	W		L	PCT
Arizona ‍†‍‍^{y}	16	–	2	.889	58	–	7	.892
UCLA ‍‍‍^{y}	14	–	2	.875	54	–	2	.964
California ‍‍‍^{y}	8	–	8	.500	47	–	16	.746
Arizona State ‍‍‍	7	–	9	.438	21	–	21	.500
Oregon ‍‍‍	5	–	13	.278	26	–	28	.481
Oregon State ‍‍‍	2	–	18	.100	13	–	28	.317
† – Conference champion y – Invited to the NCAA tournament

The 1992 Arizona Wildcats softball team represented the University of Arizona in the 1992 NCAA Division I softball season. The Wildcats were coached by Mike Candrea, who led his seventh season. The Wildcats finished with a record of 58–7. They competed in the Pacific-10 Conference, where they finished first with a 16–2 record.

The Wildcats were invited to the 1992 NCAA Division I softball tournament, where they swept the Regional and then completed a run to the title game of the Women's College World Series where they fell to champion UCLA.

== Personnel ==
=== Roster ===
1992 Arizona Wildcats roster
Pitchers: 1 – Susie Parra – sophomore; 32 – Debby Day – senior; Catchers: 10 – Renee Rosas – junior; 15 – Jody Miller-Pruitt – junior	Infielders: 3 – Stephanie Salcido – senior; 5 – Susie Duarte – sophomore; 8 – Amy Chellevold – freshman; 11 – Lisa Guise – junior; 20 – Laura Espinoza – freshman	Outfielders: 4 – Jennifer Martinez – freshman; 7 – Valerie Zepeda – sophomore; 18 – Amanda Colvin – freshman; 23 – Stacy Redondo – junior; 24 – Jamie Heggen – junior

=== Coaches ===
1992 Arizona Wildcats softball coaching staff
- Mike Candrea - Head coach - 7th season
- Larry Ray - Assistant coach - 7th season
- Bill Barth - Assistant coach - 1st season

== Schedule ==
Legend
	Arizona win
	Arizona loss
*	Non-Conference game

1992 Arizona Wildcats softball game log
Regular season

February
Date	Opponent	Site/stadium	Score	Overall record	Pac-10 record
Feb 8	Western New Mexico*	UA Softball Field • Tucson, AZ	W 2–0	1–0	
Feb 8	Western New Mexico*	UA Softball Field • Tucson, AZ	W 8–0	2–0	
Feb 9	UIC*	UA Softball Field • Tucson, AZ	W 2–0	3–0	
Feb 9	UIC*	UA Softball Field • Tucson, AZ	W 12–0^{5}	4–0	
Feb 12	Ohio State*	UA Softball Field • Tucson, AZ	W 1–0	5–0	
Feb 14	New Mexico State*	UA Softball Field • Tucson, AZ	W 3–0	6–0	
Feb 14	Pacific*	UA Softball Field • Tucson, AZ	W 2–0	7–0	
Feb 14	No. 5 Cal State Fullerton*	UA Softball Field • Tucson, AZ	W 6–2	8–0	
Feb 15	No. 17 Minnesota*	UA Softball Field • Tucson, AZ	W 4–0	9–0	
Feb 15	No. 10 Texas A&M*	UA Softball Field • Tucson, AZ	W 4–1	10–0	
Feb 16	No. 12 Long Beach State*	UA Softball Field • Tucson, AZ	W 3–2	11–0	
Feb 20	Colorado State*	UA Softball Field • Tucson, AZ	W 1–0^{8}	12–0	
Feb 20	Colorado State*	UA Softball Field • Tucson, AZ	W 1–0	13–0	
Feb 21	vs No. 7 Iowa*	Tempe, AZ	W 6–1	14–0	
Feb 22	vs No. 5 UNLV*	Tempe, AZ	W 1–0^{8}	15–0	
Feb 22	vs No. 19 Oklahoma State*	Tempe, AZ	W 4–3	16–0	
Feb 23	vs Northwestern*	Tempe, AZ	W 2–0	17–0	

March
Date	Opponent	Site/stadium	Score	Overall record	Pac-10 record
Mar 5	vs San Diego State*	Las Cruces, NM	W 10–0^{5}	18–0	
Mar 5	vs New Mexico*	Las Cruces, NM	W 12–0^{6}	19–0	
Mar 6	vs Western Michigan*	Las Cruces, NM	W 3–0	20–0	
Mar 6	vs Northwestern*	Las Cruces, NM	W 11–0^{5}	21–0	
Mar 6	vs Utah*	Las Cruces, NM	W 8–0	22–0	
Mar 7	vs Creighton*	Las Cruces, NM	W 8–0^{5}	23–0	
Mar 7	at New Mexico State*	Las Cruces, NM	W 6–2	24–0	
Mar 7	vs No. 2 Fresno State*	Las Cruces, NM	L 1–2	24–1	
Mar 10	New Mexico*	UA Softball Field • Tucson, AZ	W 5–0	25–1	
Mar 10	New Mexico*	UA Softball Field • Tucson, AZ	W 5–3	26–1	
Mar 13	No. 10 Arizona State	UA Softball Field • Tucson, AZ	W 1–0	27–1	1–0
Mar 13	No. 10 Arizona State	UA Softball Field • Tucson, AZ	W 1–0	28–1	2–0
Mar 26	vs No. 11 Minnesota*	Titan Softball Complex • Fullerton, CA	W 4–0	29–1	
Mar 26	vs No. 6 Oklahoma State*	Titan Softball Complex • Fullerton, CA	L 0–1	29–2	
Mar 27	vs No. 13 Cal Poly Pomona*	Titan Softball Complex • Fullerton, CA	W 1–0	30–2	
Mar 28	vs No. 14 Florida State*	Titan Softball Complex • Fullerton, CA	W 2–0	31–2	
Mar 28	vs No. 8 UNLV*	Titan Softball Complex • Fullerton, CA	W 1–0	32–2	
Mar 29	vs No. 13 Cal Poly Pomona*	Titan Softball Complex • Fullerton, CA	W 2–1	33–2	
Mar 29	at Cal State Fullerton*	Titan Softball Complex • Fullerton, CA	L 1–2	33–3	

April/May
Date	Opponent	Site/stadium	Score	Overall record	Pac-10 record
Apr 4	No. 3 California	UA Softball Field • Tucson, AZ	W 3–1	34–3	3–0
Apr 4	No. 3 California	UA Softball Field • Tucson, AZ	W 2–1^{13}	35–3	4–0
Apr 5	New Mexico State*	UA Softball Field • Tucson, AZ	W 5–1	36–3	
Apr 5	New Mexico State*	UA Softball Field • Tucson, AZ	W 3–1	37–3	
Apr 7	at No. 1 UCLA	Sunset Field • Los Angeles, CA	W 1–0	38–3	5–0
Apr 7	at No. 1 UCLA	Sunset Field • Los Angeles, CA	L 0–1	38–4	5–1
Apr 8	at No. 9 Cal State Northridge*	Northridge, CA	W 6–1	39–4	
Apr 8	at No. 9 Cal State Northridge*	Northridge, CA	W 2–1	40–4	
Apr 11	Oregon State	UA Softball Field • Tucson, AZ	W 8–0	41–4	6–1
Apr 11	Oregon State	UA Softball Field • Tucson, AZ	W 10–0^{6}	42–4	7–1
Apr 12	Oregon	UA Softball Field • Tucson, AZ	W 6–0	43–4	8–1
Apr 12	Oregon	UA Softball Field • Tucson, AZ	W 3–2	44–4	9–1
Apr 17	vs Southern Utah*	Salt Lake City, UT	W 11–0^{5}	45–4	
Apr 17	vs Southern Utah*	Salt Lake City, UT	W 13–0^{6}	46–4	
Apr 22	at No. 20 Arizona State	Tempe, AZ	W 6–0	47–4	10–1
Apr 22	at No. 20 Arizona State	Tempe, AZ	W 4–1	48–4	11–1
Apr 24	at Oregon State	Corvallis, OR	W 3–0	49–4	12–1
Apr 24	at Oregon State	Corvallis, OR	W 6–0	50–4	13–1
Apr 25	at Oregon	Howe Field • Eugene, OR	W 6–0	51–4	14–1
Apr 25	at Oregon	Howe Field • Eugene, OR	W 1–0	52–4	15–1
May 9	No. 1 UCLA	UA Softball Field • Tucson, AZ	L 0–1	52–5	15–2
May 9	No. 1 UCLA	UA Softball Field • Tucson, AZ	W 7–0	53–5	16–2

Postseason

NCAA Regional
Date	Opponent	Site/stadium	Score	Overall record	NCAAT record
May 16	Michigan	UA Softball Field • Tucson, AZ	W 1–0	54–5	1–0
May 17	Michigan	UA Softball Field • Tucson, AZ	W 8–0	55–5	2–0

NCAA Women's College World Series
Date	Opponent	Site/stadium	Score	Overall record	WCWS Record
May 22	Long Beach State	ASA Hall of Fame Stadium • Oklahoma City, OK	L 0–1	55–6	0–1
May 23	Kansas	ASA Hall of Fame Stadium • Oklahoma City, OK	W 1–0^{17}	56–6	1–1
May 23	California	ASA Hall of Fame Stadium • Oklahoma City, OK	W 2–1	57–6	2–1
May 24	Fresno State	ASA Hall of Fame Stadium • Oklahoma City, OK	W 1–0	58–6	3–1
May 25	UCLA	ASA Hall of Fame Stadium • Oklahoma City, OK	L 0–2	58–7	3–2
