= 2002 UCLA Bruins softball team =

American college softball season

2002 UCLA Bruins softball

NCAA Regional No. 1 champion Pac-10 champion

Women's College World Series, 1–2
- Conference: Pacific-10 Conference
- Record: 55–9 (18–3 Pac-10)
- Head coach: Sue Enquist (14th season)
- Home stadium: Easton Stadium

2002 Pacific-10 Conference softball standings
	Conf.				Overall
Team	W		L	PCT	W		L	PCT
No. 5 UCLA ‍†‍‍^{y}	18	–	3	.857	55	–	9	.859
No. 2 Arizona ‍‍‍^{y}	15	–	6	.714	55	–	12	.821
No. 14 Washington ‍‍‍^{y}	13	–	8	.619	46	–	18	.719
No. 1 California ‍‍‍^{y}	12	–	9	.571	56	–	19	.747
No. 3 Arizona State ‍‍‍^{y}	10	–	11	.476	46	–	20	.697
No. 15 Stanford ‍‍‍^{y}	7	–	14	.333	44	–	20	.688
No. 24 Oregon State ‍‍‍^{y}	7	–	14	.333	40	–	25	.615
Oregon ‍‍‍	2	–	19	.095	24	–	30	.444
† – Conference champion y – Invited to the NCAA tournament As of June 30, 2002; Rankings from NFCA/USA Today

The 2002 UCLA Bruins softball team represented the University of California, Los Angeles in the 2002 NCAA Division I softball season. The Bruins were coached by Sue Enquist, in her fourteenth season as head coach. The Bruins played their home games at Easton Stadium and finished with a record of 55–9. They competed in the Pacific-10 Conference, where they finished first with a 18–3 record.

The Bruins were invited to the 2002 NCAA Division I softball tournament, where they won the Regional to advance to the Women's College World Series. They finished tied for fifth place with a win against Oklahoma losses to eventual semifinalists Florida State and Arizona State.

== Personnel ==
=== Roster ===
2002 UCLA Bruins roster
Pitchers: 7 - Amanda Freed - Senior; 14 - Kiera Goerl - Sophomore; Catchers: 22 - Nicole Sandberg - Freshman; 23 - Toria Auelua - Junior; 33 - Stacey Nuveman - Graduate	Infielders: 3 - Allison Chislock - Freshman; 10 - Crissy Buck - Senior; 11 - Monique Mejia - Junior; 13 - Julie Hoshizaki - Sophomore; 20 - Claire Sua - Sophomore; 21 - Tairia Mims - Junior; 27 - Natasha Watley - Junior; Utility: 5 - Casey Hiraiwa - Graduate	Outfielders: 2 - Erin Rahn - Senior; 9 - Amanda Simpson - Sophomore; 44 - Stephanie Ramos - Sophomore

=== Coaches ===
2002 UCLA Bruins softball coaching staff
- Sue Enquist - Head coach - 14th season
- Kelly Inouye-Perez - Assistant Coach - 9th season
- Lisa Fernandez - Assistant Coach - 7th season
- Gina Vecchione - Assistant Coach - 3rd season

== Schedule ==
Legend
	UCLA win
	UCLA loss
*	Non-Conference game

2002 UCLA Bruins softball game log
Regular season

February
Date	Opponent	Rank	Site/stadium	Score	Overall record	Pac-10 record
Feb 1	Louisiana–Monroe*	No. 2	Easton Stadium • Los Angeles, CA (Northridge Early Bird Classic)	W 8–0 ^{(5)}	1–0	
Feb 2	No. 23 San Diego State*	No. 2	Easton Stadium • Los Angeles, CA (Northridge Early Bird Classic)	W 8–0 ^{(5)}	2–0	
Feb 3	San Jose State*	No. 2	Easton Stadium • Los Angeles, CA (Northridge Early Bird Classic)	W 3–0	3–0	
Feb 8	vs Texas Tech*	No. 1	Alberta B. Farrington Softball Stadium • Tempe, AZ (Fiesta Bowl Classic)	W 11–0 ^{(5)}	4–0	
Feb 8	vs Texas A&M*	No. 1	Alberta B. Farrington Softball Stadium • Tempe, AZ (Fiesta Bowl Classic)	W 9–1 ^{(5)}	5–0	
Feb 9	vs Texas*	No. 1	Alberta B. Farrington Softball Stadium • Tempe, AZ (Fiesta Bowl Classic)	W 14–0 ^{(5)}	6–0	
Feb 9	vs No. 9 Nebraska*	No. 1	Alberta B. Farrington Softball Stadium • Tempe, AZ (Fiesta Bowl Classic)	W 6–1	7–0	
Feb 10	vs Utah State*	No. 1	Alberta B. Farrington Softball Stadium • Tempe, AZ (Fiesta Bowl Classic)	W 9–0 ^{(6)}	8–0	
Feb 10	vs Texas State*	No. 1	Alberta B. Farrington Softball Stadium • Tempe, AZ (Fiesta Bowl Classic)	W 4–0	9–0	
Feb 15	vs Texas Tech*	No. 1	Eller Media Stadium • Paradise, NV (UNLV Classic)	W 13–2 ^{(5)}	10–0	
Feb 15	vs No. 14 Alabama*	No. 1	Eller Media Stadium • Paradise, NV (UNLV Classic)	W 9–1	11–0	
Feb 16	vs BYU*	No. 1	Eller Media Stadium • Paradise, NV (UNLV Classic)	W 10–2^{(5)}	12–0	
Feb 16	vs No. 4 Nebraska*	No. 1	Eller Media Stadium • Paradise, NV (UNLV Classic)	W 11–2 ^{(5)}	13–0	
Feb 17	vs No. 5 LSU*	No. 1	Eller Media Stadium • Paradise, NV (UNLV Classic)	W 7–0	14–0	
Feb 20	UC Riverside*	No. 1	Easton Stadium • Los Angeles, CA	W 14–0 ^{(5)}	15–0	
Feb 20	UC Riverside*	No. 1	Easton Stadium • Los Angeles, CA	W 6–0	16–0	
Feb 23	at Long Beach State*	No. 1	LBSU Softball Complex • Long Beach, CA	L 2–3 ^{(9)}	16–1	
Feb 23	at Long Beach State*	No. 1	LBSU Softball Complex • Long Beach, CA	W 10–0	17–1	
Feb 27	No. 11 Cal State Fullerton*	No. 1	Easton Stadium • Los Angeles, CA	L 1–3	17–2	
Feb 27	No. 11 Cal State Fullerton*	No. 1	Easton Stadium • Los Angeles, CA	W 5–2	18–2	

March
Date	Opponent	Rank	Site/stadium	Score	Overall record	Pac-10 record
Mar 1	Texas A&M–Corpus Christi*	No. 1	Easton Stadium • Los Angeles, CA (Stacy Winsburg Memorial Tournament)	W 9–1 ^{(5)}	19–2	
Mar 1	Texas A&M–Corpus Christi*	No. 1	Easton Stadium • Los Angeles, CA (Stacy Winsburg Memorial Tournament)	W 8–0 ^{(5)}	20–2	
Mar 2	Purdue*	No. 1	Easton Stadium • Los Angeles, CA (Stacy Winsburg Memorial Tournament)	W 4–2	21–2	
Mar 2	Purdue*	No. 1	Easton Stadium • Los Angeles, CA (Stacy Winsburg Memorial Tournament)	W 4–2	22–2	
Mar 3	Florida*	No. 1	Easton Stadium • Los Angeles, CA (Stacy Winsburg Memorial Tournament)	W 11–1	23–2	
Mar 8	vs Long Beach State*	No. 1	Pleasanton Softball Complex • Pleasanton, CA (National Invitational Softball Tournament)	W 4–1	24–2	
Mar 8	vs UNC Greensboro*	No. 1	Pleasanton Softball Complex • Pleasanton, CA (National Invitational Softball Tournament)	W 8–0 ^{(6)}	25–2	
Mar 8	vs No. 14 Iowa*	No. 1	Pleasanton Softball Complex • Pleasanton, CA (National Invitational Softball Tournament)	W 4–0	26–2	
Mar 9	vs Virginia*	No. 1	Pleasanton Softball Complex • Pleasanton, CA (National Invitational Softball Tournament)	W 2–0	27–2	
Mar 9	vs No. 14 Iowa*	No. 1	Pleasanton Softball Complex • Pleasanton, CA (National Invitational Softball Tournament)	L 0–1	27–3	
Mar 9	vs Virginia*	No. 1	Pleasanton Softball Complex • Pleasanton, CA (National Invitational Softball Tournament)	W 2–0	28–3	
Mar 13	UC Santa Barbara*	No. 1	Easton Stadium • Los Angeles, CA	W 7–1	29–3	
Mar 13	UC Santa Barbara*	No. 1	Easton Stadium • Los Angeles, CA	W 4–0	30–3	
Mar 25	No. 12 Fresno State*	No. 1	Easton Stadium • Los Angeles, CA	W 1–0	31–3	
Mar 25	No. 12 Fresno State*	No. 1	Easton Stadium • Los Angeles, CA	W 7–0	32–3	
Mar 29	at No. 10 Washington	No. 1	Husky Softball Stadium • Seattle, WA	W 2–0	33–3	1–0
Mar 30	at No. 10 Washington	No. 1	Husky Softball Stadium • Seattle, WA	L 6–9	33–4	1–1

April
Date	Opponent	Rank	Site/stadium	Score	Overall record	Pac-10 record
Apr 5	at No. 6 Arizona State	No. 2	Alberta B. Farrington Softball Stadium • Tempe, AZ	L 2–3	33–5	1–2
Apr 6	at No. 1 Arizona	No. 2	Rita Hillenbrand Memorial Stadium • Tucson, AZ	L 2–3	33–6	1–3
Apr 7	at No. 1 Arizona	No. 2	Rita Hillenbrand Memorial Stadium • Tucson, AZ	W 6–5	34–6	2–3
Apr 12	No. 3 Stanford	No. 2	Easton Stadium • Los Angeles, CA	W 3–2	35–6	3–3
Apr 13	No. 8 California	No. 2	Easton Stadium • Los Angeles, CA	W 3–0	36–6	4–3
Apr 14	No. 8 California	No. 2	Easton Stadium • Los Angeles, CA	W 1–0 ^{(10)}	37–6	5–3
Apr 19	No. 16 Oregon State	No. 1	Easton Stadium • Los Angeles, CA	W 7–0	38–6	6–3
Apr 20	Oregon	No. 1	Easton Stadium • Los Angeles, CA	W 7–0	39–6	7–3
Apr 21	Oregon	No. 1	Easton Stadium • Los Angeles, CA	W 3–1	40–6	8–3
Apr 24	No. 6 Washington	No. 1	Easton Stadium • Los Angeles, CA	W 5–3	41–6	9–3
Apr 26	at No. 5 California	No. 1	Levine-Fricke Field • Berkeley, CA	W 3–0	42–6	10–3
Apr 27	at No. 8 Stanford	No. 1	Boyd & Jill Smith Family Stadium • Stanford, CA	W 13–2 ^{(5)}	43–6	11–3
Apr 28	at No. 8 Stanford	No. 1	Boyd & Jill Smith Family Stadium • Stanford, CA	W 2–0	44–6	12–3

May
Date	Opponent	Rank	Site/stadium	Score	Overall record	Pac-10 record
May 3	at Oregon	No. 1	Howe Field • Eugene, OR	W 2–1	45–6	13–3
May 4	at No. 15 Oregon State	No. 1	Oregon State Softball Complex • Corvallis, OR	W 10–1	46–6	14–3
May 5	at No. 15 Oregon State	No. 1	Oregon State Softball Complex • Corvallis, OR	W 8–0	47–6	15–3
May 10	No. 2 Arizona	No. 1	Easton Stadium • Los Angeles, CA	W 4–2	48–6	16–3
May 11	No. 4 Arizona State	No. 1	Easton Stadium • Los Angeles, CA	W 4–1	49–6	17–3
May 11	No. 4 Arizona State	No. 1	Easton Stadium • Los Angeles, CA	W 6–1	50–6	18–3

Postseason

NCAA Regional No. 1
Date	Opponent	Rank	Site/stadium	Score	Overall record	NCAAT record
May 16	Liberty	No. 1	Beckham Field • Columbia, SC	W 3–0	51–6	1–0
May 17	Eastern Kentucky	No. 1	Beckham Field • Columbia, SC	W 10–0 ^{(5)}	52–6	2–0
May 18	No. 25 Georgia	No. 1	Beckham Field • Columbia, SC	W 2–1 ^{(8)}	53–6	3–0
May 19	South Carolina	No. 1	Beckham Field • Columbia, SC	L 1–2	53–7	3–1
May 19	South Carolina	No. 1	Beckham Field • Columbia, SC	W 1–0	54–7	4–1

NCAA Women's College World Series
Date	Opponent	Rank (Seed)	Site/stadium	Score	Overall record	WCWS Record
May 23	No. 21 (8) Florida State	No. 1 (1)	ASA Hall of Fame Stadium • Oklahoma City, OK	L 1–2	54–8	0–1
May 25	No. 13 (5) Oklahoma	No. 1 (1)	ASA Hall of Fame Stadium • Oklahoma City, OK	W 2–0	55–8	1–1
May 25	No. 4 (3) Arizona State	No. 1 (1)	ASA Hall of Fame Stadium • Oklahoma City, OK	L 2–8	55–9	1–2

== Ranking movements ==
Ranking movements Legend: ██ Increase in ranking ██ Decrease in ranking
	Week													
Poll	Pre	1	2	3	4	5	6	7	8	9	10	11	12	Final
NFCA/USA Today	2	1	1	1	1	1	1	1	2	2	1	1	1	5
