= 1992 UCLA Bruins softball team =

American college softball season

1992 UCLA Bruins softball

National Champion NCAA Regional champion
- Conference: Pacific-10 Conference
- Record: 54–2 (14–2 Pac-10)
- Head coach: Sharron Backus (18th season) & Sue Enquist (4th season)
- Home stadium: Sunset Field

1992 Pacific-10 Conference softball standings
	Conf.				Overall
Team	W		L	PCT	W		L	PCT
Arizona ‍†‍‍^{y}	16	–	2	.889	58	–	7	.892
UCLA ‍‍‍^{y}	14	–	2	.875	54	–	2	.964
California ‍‍‍^{y}	8	–	8	.500	47	–	16	.746
Arizona State ‍‍‍	7	–	9	.438	21	–	21	.500
Oregon ‍‍‍	5	–	13	.278	26	–	28	.481
Oregon State ‍‍‍	2	–	18	.100	13	–	28	.317
† – Conference champion y – Invited to the NCAA tournament

The 1992 UCLA Bruins softball team represented the University of California, Los Angeles in the 1992 NCAA Division I softball season. The Bruins were coached by Sharron Backus, who led her eighteenth season and Sue Enquist, in her fourth season, in an uncommonly used co-head coach system. The Bruins played their home games at Sunset Field and finished with a record of 54–2. They competed in the Pacific-10 Conference, where they finished second with a 14–2 record.

The Bruins were invited to the 1992 NCAA Division I softball tournament, where they swept the West Regional and then completed a run through the Women's College World Series to claim their sixth NCAA Women's College World Series Championship. The Bruins had earlier claimed an AIAW title in 1978 and NCAA titles in 1982, 1984, 1988, 1989, and 1990.

== Personnel ==
=== Roster ===
1992 UCLA Bruins roster
Pitchers: 5 – DeeDee Weiman – junior; 10 – Heather Compton – junior; 16 - Lisa Fernandez – junior; Catchers: 2 - Kelly Inouye – junior; 7 – Joanne Alchin – freshman; 9 – Cindy Valero – freshman	Infielders: 4 – Kristy Howard – junior; 17 – Nichole Victoria – sophomore; 32 - Jennifer Brundage – freshman; Utility: 12 – Janae Deffenbaugh – sophomore; 13 – Jenny Brewster – freshman	Outfielders: 3 – Felicia Cruz – freshman; 8 – Yvonne Gutierrez – senior; 22 – Kathi Evans – freshman

=== Coaches ===
1992 UCLA Bruins softball coaching staff
- Sharron Backus - co-Head coach - 18th season
- Sue Enquist - co-Head coach - 4th season
- Kirk Walker - Assistant Coach - 3rd season
- Kerry Dienelt - Graduate Assistant Coach - 1st season

== Schedule ==
Legend
	UCLA win
	UCLA loss
*	Non-Conference game

1992 UCLA Bruins softball game log
Regular season

February
Date	Opponent	Site/stadium	Score	Overall record	Pac-10 record
Feb 5	Cal State Northridge*	Sunset Field • Los Angeles, CA	W 3–0	1–0	
Feb 5	Cal State Northridge*	Sunset Field • Los Angeles, CA	W 2–0	2–0	
Feb 14	vs Pacific*	Tucson, AZ	W 10–0^{5}	3–0	
Feb 14	vs Minnesota*	Tucson, AZ	W 6–0	4–0	
Feb 14	vs Texas A&M*	Tucson, AZ	W 5–3	5–0	
Feb 15	vs New Mexico State*	Tucson, AZ	W 15–0^{5}	6–0	
Feb 15	vs Long Beach State*	Tucson, AZ	W 3–1	7–0	
Feb 16	vs Ohio State*	Tucson, AZ	W 1–0	8–0	
Feb 20	vs Minnesota*	Escondido, CA	W 1–0	9–0	
Feb 20	vs Saint Mary's*	Escondido, CA	W 9–0	10–0	
Feb 21	vs Long Beach State*	Escondido, CA	W 4–3	11–0	
Feb 21	vs Cal State Northridge*	Escondido, CA	W 3–0	12–0	
Feb 21	vs San Diego State*	Escondido, CA	W 9–0^{5}	13–0	
Feb 22	vs South Florida*	Escondido, CA	W 6–0	14–0	
Feb 23	vs Minnesota*	Escondido, CA	W 5–0	15–0	
Feb 23	vs Long Beach State*	Escondido, CA	W 4–3	16–0	
Feb 29	at Long Beach State*	Long Beach, CA	W 2–0	17–0	
Feb 29	at Long Beach State*	Long Beach, CA	W 4–0	18–0	

March
Date	Opponent	Site/stadium	Score	Overall record	Pac-10 record
Mar 4	at Cal Poly Pomona*	Pomona, CA	W 2–0	19–0	
Mar 4	at Cal Poly Pomona*	Pomona, CA	W 6–0	20–0	
Mar 7	Arizona State	Sunset Field • Los Angeles, CA	W 6–2	21–0	1–0
Mar 7	Arizona State	Sunset Field • Los Angeles, CA	W 1–0	22–0	2–0
Mar 24	Oregon State	Sunset Field • Los Angeles, CA	W 1–0^{8}	23–0	3–0
Mar 24	Oregon State	Sunset Field • Los Angeles, CA	W 4–0	24–0	4–0
Mar 26	vs San Diego State*	San Jose, CA	W 6–1	25–0	
Mar 27	vs New Mexico*	San Jose, CA	W 6–0	26–0	
Mar 27	vs Nebraska*	San Jose, CA	W 6–1	27–0	
Mar 27	vs Utah State*	San Jose, CA	W 1–0^{9}	28–0	
Mar 28	vs California*	San Jose, CA	W 6–1	29–0	
Mar 28	vs Kansas*	San Jose, CA	W 10–0^{6}	30–0	
Mar 29	vs Kansas*	San Jose, CA	W 14–2	31–0	

April
Date–	Opponent	Site/stadium	Score	Overall record	Pac-10 record
Apr 2	Hawaii*	Sunset Field • Los Angeles, CA	W 2–0	32–0	
Apr 2	Hawaii*	Sunset Field • Los Angeles, CA	W 3–0	33–0	
Apr 7	Arizona	Sunset Field • Los Angeles, CA	L 0–1	33–1	4–1
Apr 7	Arizona	Sunset Field • Los Angeles, CA	W 1–0	34–1	5–1
Apr 11	at California	Hearst Field • Berkeley, CA	W 2–0	35–1	6–1
Apr 11	at California	Hearst Field • Berkeley, CA	W 3–1^{9}	36–1	7–1
Apr 18	at Oregon State	Corvallis, OR	W 2–0	37–1	8–1
Apr 18	at Oregon State	Corvallis, OR	W 6–0	38–1	9–1
Apr 19	at Oregon	Howe Field • Eugene, OR	W 4–1	39–1	10–1
Apr 19	at Oregon	Howe Field • Eugene, OR	W 4–1	40–1	11–1
Apr 21	Cal Poly Pomona*	Sunset Field • Los Angeles, CA	W 3–0	41–1	
Apr 21	Cal Poly Pomona*	Sunset Field • Los Angeles, CA	W 17–0	42–1	
Apr 25	California	Sunset Field • Los Angeles, CA	W 2–0	43–1	12–1
Apr 25	California	Sunset Field • Los Angeles, CA	W 4–3^{12}	44–1	13–1
Apr 26	Sacramento State*	Sunset Field • Los Angeles, CA	W 4–0	45–1	
Apr 26	Sacramento State*	Sunset Field • Los Angeles, CA	W 7–0	46–1	

May
Date	Opponent	Site/stadium	Score	Overall record	Pac-10 record
May 9	at Arizona	Tucson, AZ	W 1–0	47–1	14–1
May 9	at Arizona	Tucson, AZ	L 0–7	47–2	14–2

Postseason

NCAA Regional
Date	Opponent	Site/stadium	Score	Overall record	NCAAT record
May 15	Utah	Sunset Field • Los Angeles, CA	W 1–0	48–2	1–0
May 16	Utah	Sunset Field • Los Angeles, CA	W 7–2^{10}	49–2	2–0

NCAA Women's College World Series
Date	Opponent	Site/stadium	Score	Overall record	WCWS Record
May 21	UMass	ASA Hall of Fame Stadium • Oklahoma City, OK	W 4–0	50–2	1–0
May 23	California	ASA Hall of Fame Stadium • Oklahoma City, OK	W 10–0^{5}	51–2	2–0
May 24	Fresno State	ASA Hall of Fame Stadium • Oklahoma City, OK	W 4–0	52–2	3–0
May 24	UMass	ASA Hall of Fame Stadium • Oklahoma City, OK	W 11–1^{5}	53–2	4–0
May 25	Arizona	ASA Hall of Fame Stadium • Oklahoma City, OK	W 2–0	54–2	5–0
