= 2002 Arizona Wildcats softball team =

American college softball season

2002 Arizona Wildcats softball

NCAA Regional champion

Women's College World Series, runner-up
- Conference: Pacific-10 Conference
- Record: 55–12 (15–6 Pac-10)
- Head coach: Mike Candrea (17th season)

2002 Pacific-10 Conference softball standings
	Conf.				Overall
Team	W		L	PCT	W		L	PCT
No. 5 UCLA ‍†‍‍^{y}	18	–	3	.857	55	–	9	.859
No. 2 Arizona ‍‍‍^{y}	15	–	6	.714	55	–	12	.821
No. 14 Washington ‍‍‍^{y}	13	–	8	.619	46	–	18	.719
No. 1 California ‍‍‍^{y}	12	–	9	.571	56	–	19	.747
No. 3 Arizona State ‍‍‍^{y}	10	–	11	.476	46	–	20	.697
No. 15 Stanford ‍‍‍^{y}	7	–	14	.333	44	–	20	.688
No. 24 Oregon State ‍‍‍^{y}	7	–	14	.333	40	–	25	.615
Oregon ‍‍‍	2	–	19	.095	24	–	30	.444
† – Conference champion y – Invited to the NCAA tournament As of June 30, 2002; Rankings from NFCA/USA Today

The 2002 Arizona Wildcats softball team represented the University of Arizona in the 2002 NCAA Division I softball season. The Wildcats were coached by Mike Candrea, who led his seventeenth season. The Wildcats finished with a record of 55–12. They competed in the Pacific-10 Conference, where they finished second with a 15–6 record.

The Wildcats were invited to the 2002 NCAA Division I softball tournament, where they won their Regional and then completed a run to the title game of the Women's College World Series where they fell to champion California.

== Personnel ==
=== Roster ===
2002 Arizona Wildcats roster
Pitchers: 11 – Marissa Marzan – freshman; 15 – Jenny Gladding – sophomore; 22 – Courtney Fossatti – freshman; 27 - Jennie Finch – senior; Catchers: 52 – Mackenzie Vandergeest – sophomore; 77 – Jackie Coburn – freshman	Infielders: 3 - Lovieanne Jung – junior; 8 – Lisha Ribellia – junior; 9 – Leneah Manuma – sophomore; 20 – Candace Abrams – freshman	Outfielders: 2 – Rebekah Quiroz – freshman; 4 – Carrie Hagen – freshman; 5 – Crystal Farley – freshman; 12 – Allyson Von Liechtenstein – freshman; 21 – Meaghan Finnerty – senior

=== Coaches ===
2002 Arizona Wildcats softball coaching staff
- Mike Candrea - Head coach - 17th season
- Larry Ray - Assistant Coach - 11th season
- Nancy Evans - Assistant Coach - 2nd season

== Schedule ==
Legend
	Arizona win
	Arizona loss
*	Non-Conference game

2002 Arizona Wildcats softball game log
Regular season

February
Date	Opponent	Rank	Site/stadium	Score	Overall record	Pac-10 record
Feb 1	No. 13 Alabama*	No. 1	Rita Hillenbrand Memorial Stadium • Tucson, AZ	W 8–2	1–0	
Feb 2	No. 13 Alabama*	No. 1	Rita Hillenbrand Memorial Stadium • Tucson, AZ	W 13–5^{6}	2–0	
Feb 3	No. 13 Alabama*	No. 1	Rita Hillenbrand Memorial Stadium • Tucson, AZ	W 11–1^{5}	3–0	
Feb 8	vs No. 17 Southwest Texas State*	No. 1	Alberta B. Farrington Softball Stadium • Tempe, AZ	W 10–1^{5}	4–0	
Feb 8	vs Texas*	No. 1	Alberta B. Farrington Softball Stadium • Tempe, AZ	W 3–0	5–0	
Feb 9	vs No. 10 Cal State Fullerton*	No. 1	Alberta B. Farrington Softball Stadium • Tempe, AZ	W 9–1	6–0	
Feb 9	vs Mississippi State*	No. 1	Alberta B. Farrington Softball Stadium • Tempe, AZ	L 1–7	6–1	
Feb 10	vs No. 24 UMass*	No. 1	Alberta B. Farrington Softball Stadium • Tempe, AZ	W 1–0	7–1	
Feb 10	vs Wisconsin*	No. 1	Alberta B. Farrington Softball Stadium • Tempe, AZ	L 0–3	7–2	
Feb 15	Louisville*	No. 3	Rita Hillenbrand Memorial Stadium • Tucson, AZ	W 6–2	8–2	
Feb 15	No. 14 Notre Dame*	No. 3	Rita Hillenbrand Memorial Stadium • Tucson, AZ	W 3–0	9–2	
Feb 16	No. 25 South Florida*	No. 3	Rita Hillenbrand Memorial Stadium • Tucson, AZ	W 10–0^{5}	10–2	
Feb 16	Auburn*	No. 3	Rita Hillenbrand Memorial Stadium • Tucson, AZ	W 4–0	11–2	
Feb 17	New Mexico State*	No. 3	Rita Hillenbrand Memorial Stadium • Tucson, AZ	W 8–0^{6}	12–2	
Feb 22	Eastern Michigan*	No. 2	Rita Hillenbrand Memorial Stadium • Tucson, AZ	W 11–0^{5}	13–2	
Feb 22	San Jose State*	No. 2	Rita Hillenbrand Memorial Stadium • Tucson, AZ	W 8–0^{5}	14–2	
Feb 23	Drake*	No. 2	Rita Hillenbrand Memorial Stadium • Tucson, AZ	W 12–2^{5}	15–2	
Feb 23	Northern Iowa*	No. 2	Rita Hillenbrand Memorial Stadium • Tucson, AZ	W 12–2^{5}	16–2	
Feb 24	Cal State Northridge*	No. 2	Rita Hillenbrand Memorial Stadium • Tucson, AZ	W 6–0	17–2	
Feb 27	Eastern Michigan*	No. 2	Rita Hillenbrand Memorial Stadium • Tucson, AZ	W 10–0^{5}	18–2	

March
Date	Opponent	Rank	Site/stadium	Score	Overall record	Pac-10 record
Mar 1	Southern Miss*	No. 2	Rita Hillenbrand Memorial Stadium • Tucson, AZ	W 18–0^{5}	19–2	
Mar 1	Hawaii*	No. 2	Rita Hillenbrand Memorial Stadium • Tucson, AZ	W 5–1	20–2	
Mar 2	Eastern Michigan*	No. 2	Rita Hillenbrand Memorial Stadium • Tucson, AZ	W 9–0^{6}	21–2	
Mar 2	Evansville*	No. 2	Rita Hillenbrand Memorial Stadium • Tucson, AZ	W 8–0^{5}	22–2	
Mar 3	Long Beach State*	No. 2	Rita Hillenbrand Memorial Stadium • Tucson, AZ	W 4–1	23–2	
Mar 5	Boston College*	No. 2	Rita Hillenbrand Memorial Stadium • Tucson, AZ	W 13–1	24–2	
Mar 6	Boston College*	No. 2	Rita Hillenbrand Memorial Stadium • Tucson, AZ	W 9–0^{5}	25–2	
Mar 14	vs Texas Tech*	No. 2	Anderson Family Field • Fullerton, CA	W 8–0	26–2	
Mar 14	vs Notre Dame*	No. 2	Anderson Family Field • Fullerton, CA	W 7–0	27–2	
Mar 15	vs Cal State Northridge*	No. 2	Anderson Family Field • Fullerton, CA	L 3–4	27–3	
Mar 16	vs No. 18 Louisiana–Lafayette*	No. 2	Anderson Family Field • Fullerton, CA	W 1–0	28–3	
Mar 16	vs No. 8 Arizona State*	No. 2	Anderson Family Field • Fullerton, CA	L 0–3	28–4	
Mar 22	No. 18 Louisiana–Lafayette*	No. 3	Rita Hillenbrand Memorial Stadium • Tucson, AZ	W 6–2	29–4	
Mar 23	No. 18 Louisiana–Lafayette*	No. 3	Rita Hillenbrand Memorial Stadium • Tucson, AZ	W 8–0^{6}	30–4	
Mar 24	No. 18 Louisiana–Lafayette*	No. 3	Rita Hillenbrand Memorial Stadium • Tucson, AZ	W 7–2	31–4	
Mar 29	at No. 6 Arizona State	No. 2	Alberta B. Farrington Softball Stadium • Tempe, AZ	W 2–0	32–4	1–0
Mar 30	at No. 6 Arizona State	No. 2	Alberta B. Farrington Softball Stadium • Tempe, AZ	W 10–1^{5}	33–4	2–0

April
Date	Opponent	Rank	Site/stadium	Score	Overall record	Pac-10 record
Apr 5	No. 10 Washington	No. 2	Rita Hillenbrand Memorial Stadium • Tucson, AZ	W 1–0	34–4	3–0
Apr 6	No. 1 UCLA	No. 2	Rita Hillenbrand Memorial Stadium • Tucson, AZ	W 6–2	35–4	4–0
Apr 7	No. 1 UCLA	No. 2	Rita Hillenbrand Memorial Stadium • Tucson, AZ	L 5–6	35–5	4–1
Apr 12	at No. 14 Oregon State	No. 1	Oregon State Softball Complex • Corvallis, OR	W 4–0	36–5	5–1
Apr 13	at Oregon	No. 1	Howe Field • Eugene, OR	W 2–0	37–5	6–1
Apr 14	at Oregon	No. 1	Howe Field • Eugene, OR	W 8–1	38–5	7–1
Apr 16	Oklahoma State*	No. 1	Rita Hillenbrand Memorial Stadium • Tucson, AZ	W 4–2	39–5	
Apr 17	No. 9 Oklahoma*	No. 1	Rita Hillenbrand Memorial Stadium • Tucson, AZ	W 1–0	40–5	
Apr 19	at No. 3 Stanford	No. 1	Boyd & Jill Smith Family Stadium • Stanford, CA	W 2–1	41–5	8–1
Apr 20	at No. 8 California	No. 1	Levine-Fricke Field • Berkeley, CA	L 2–5	41–6	8–2
Apr 21	at No. 8 California	No. 1	Levine-Fricke Field • Berkeley, CA	L 1–2	41–7	8–3
Apr 26	Oregon	No. 2	Rita Hillenbrand Memorial Stadium • Tucson, AZ	W 11–3^{5}	42–7	9–3
Apr 27	No. 14 Oregon State	No. 2	Rita Hillenbrand Memorial Stadium • Tucson, AZ	W 7–0	43–7	10–3
Apr 28	No. 14 Oregon State	No. 2	Rita Hillenbrand Memorial Stadium • Tucson, AZ	W 2–1	44–7	11–3
Apr 30	No. 5 Arizona State	No. 2	Rita Hillenbrand Memorial Stadium • Tucson, AZ	W 5–3	45–7	12–3

May
Date	Opponent	Rank	Site/stadium	Score	Overall record	Pac-10 record
May 3	No. 6 California	No. 2	Rita Hillenbrand Memorial Stadium • Tucson, AZ	W 3–0	46–7	13–3
May 4	No. 7 Stanford	No. 2	Rita Hillenbrand Memorial Stadium • Tucson, AZ	W 3–2	47–7	14–3
May 5	No. 7 Stanford	No. 2	Rita Hillenbrand Memorial Stadium • Tucson, AZ	W 6–1	48–7	15–3
May 10	at No. 1 UCLA	No. 2	Easton Stadium • Los Angeles, CA	L 2–4	48–8	15–4
May 11	at No. 6 Washington	No. 2	Husky Softball Stadium • Seattle, WA	L 1–3	48–9	15–5
May 11	at No. 6 Washington	No. 2	Husky Softball Stadium • Seattle, WA	L 2–3	48–10	15–6

Postseason

NCAA Regional
Date	Opponent	Rank	Site/stadium	Score	Overall record	NCAAT record
May 16	Boston University	No. 2	Minneapolis, MN	W 4–1	49–10	1–0
May 17	Penn State	No. 2	Minneapolis, MN	W 4–3	50–10	2–0
May 18	No. 16 DePaul	No. 2	Minneapolis, MN	W 2–0	51–10	3–0
May 19	No. 16 DePaul	No. 2	Minneapolis, MN	L 0–6	51–11	3–1
May 19	No. 16 DePaul	No. 2	Minneapolis, MN	W 8–0	52–11	4–1

NCAA Women's College World Series
Date	Opponent	Rank	Site/stadium	Score	Overall record	WCWS Record
May 23	No. 7 (7) Nebraska	No. 2 (2)	ASA Hall of Fame Stadium • Oklahoma City, OK	W 1–0	53–11	1–0
May 25	No. 4 (3) Arizona State	No. 2 (2)	ASA Hall of Fame Stadium • Oklahoma City, OK	W 1–0^{8}	54–11	2–0
May 26	No. 21 (8) Florida State	No. 2 (2)	ASA Hall of Fame Stadium • Oklahoma City, OK	W 6–0^{11}	55–11	3–0
May 27	No. 5 (4) California	No. 2 (2)	ASA Hall of Fame Stadium • Oklahoma City, OK	L 0–6	55–12	3–1

== Ranking movements ==
Ranking movements Legend: ██ Increase in ranking ██ Decrease in ranking
	Week													
Poll	Pre	1	2	3	4	5	6	7	8	9	10	11	12	Final
NFCA/USA Today	1	3	2	2	2	3	2	2	1	1	2	2	2	2
