= 1992 NCAA Division I softball season =

American college softball season

- Defending Champions: Arizona

Tournament

Women's College World Series
- Champions: UCLA (7th (8th overall) title)
- Runners-up: Arizona (5th WCWS Appearance)
- Winning Coach: Sharron Backus & Sue Enquist (7th (8th overall) & 3rd title)

Seasons
- ← 1991 1993 →

The 1992 NCAA Division I softball season, play of college softball in the United States organized by the National Collegiate Athletic Association (NCAA) at the Division I level, began in February 1992. The season progressed through the regular season, many conference tournaments and championship series, and concluded with the 1992 NCAA Division I softball tournament and 1992 Women's College World Series. The Women's College World Series, consisting of the eight remaining teams in the NCAA Tournament and held in Oklahoma City at ASA Hall of Fame Stadium, ended on May 26, 1992.

== Conference standings ==
1992 Big Ten Conference softball standings
	Conf.						Overall
Team	W		L		T	PCT	W		L		T	PCT
Michigan ‍†‍‍^{y}	22	–	6	–	0	.786	37	–	24	–	0	.607
Iowa ‍‍‍	21	–	7	–	0	.750	34	–	10	–	0	.773
Northwestern ‍‍‍	18	–	10	–	0	.643	33	–	25	–	1	.568
Minnesota ‍‍‍	16	–	12	–	0	.571	33	–	28	–	1	.540
Indiana ‍‍‍	14	–	14	–	0	.500	25	–	30	–	0	.455
Ohio State ‍‍‍	11	–	17	–	0	.393	23	–	36	–	0	.390
Penn State ‍‍‍	4	–	22	–	0	.154	10	–	29	–	0	.256
Michigan State ‍‍‍	4	–	22	–	0	.154	6	–	38	–	0	.136
† – Conference champion y – Invited to the NCAA tournament

1992 Pacific-10 Conference softball standings
	Conf.				Overall
Team	W		L	PCT	W		L	PCT
Arizona ‍†‍‍^{y}	16	–	2	.889	58	–	7	.892
UCLA ‍‍‍^{y}	14	–	2	.875	54	–	2	.964
California ‍‍‍^{y}	8	–	8	.500	47	–	16	.746
Arizona State ‍‍‍	7	–	9	.438	21	–	21	.500
Oregon ‍‍‍	5	–	13	.278	26	–	28	.481
Oregon State ‍‍‍	2	–	18	.100	13	–	28	.317
† – Conference champion y – Invited to the NCAA tournament

1992 Southland Conference softball standings
	Conf.						Overall
Team	W		L		T	PCT	W		L		T	PCT
Nicholls State ‍†‍‍	17	–	9	–	0	.654	36	–	16	–	1	.689
Sam Houston State ‍‍‍	18	–	10	–	0	.643	41	–	21	–	0	.661
Northeast Louisiana ‍‍‍	18	–	10	–	0	.643	39	–	35	–	0	.527
Northwestern Louisiana ‍‍‍	16	–	11	–	0	.593	37	–	21	–	1	.636
Texas–Arlington ‍‍‍	16	–	12	–	0	.571	32	–	30	–	0	.516
Southwest Texas State ‍‍‍	11	–	17	–	0	.393	21	–	26	–	0	.447
Stephen F. Austin ‍‍‍	7	–	18	–	0	.280	22	–	30	–	0	.423
McNeese State ‍‍‍	6	–	22	–	0	.214	18	–	36	–	0	.333
Texas–San Antonio* ‍‍‍	0	–	0	–	0	–	15	–	36	–	0	.294
† – Conference champion y – Invited to the NCAA tournament * UTSA did not compete for 1992 conference regular season championship.

== Women's College World Series ==
The 1992 NCAA Women's College World Series took place from May 23 to May 26, 1992, in Oklahoma City.

Upper round 1
UCLA	4
UMass	0
Florida State	0
California	3
Fresno State	4^{8}
Kansas	1
Long Beach State	1
Arizona	0

Upper round 2
UCLA	10^{5}
California	0
Fresno State	4
Long Beach State	0
Lower round 1
UMass	4
Florida State	2
Kansas	0
Arizona	1^{17}

Upper final
UCLA	4
Fresno State	0
Lower round 2
Long Beach State	1
UMass	2^{10}
California	1
Arizona	2

Semifinals
UCLA	11^{5}
UMass	1
Fresno State	0
Arizona	1

Final
UCLA	2
Arizona	0

== Season leaders ==
Batting

- Batting average: .513 – Crystal Boyd, Hofstra Pride
- RBIs: 61 – Dana Fulmore, South Carolina Gamecocks
- Home runs: 11 – Yvonne Gutierrez, UCLA Bruins & Heather Robinson, Sam Houston State Bearkats

Pitching

- Wins: 38-13 – Jenny Parsons, East Carolina Pirates
- ERA: 0.14 (4 ER/196.1 IP) – Lisa Fernandez, UCLA Bruins
- Strikeouts: 329 – Michele Granger, California Golden Bears

== Records ==
Freshman class single game triples: 3 – Melissa Scarborough, UMBC Retrievers; April 3, 1992

Sophomore class single game walks: 5 – Coli Turley, Eastern Illinois Panthers; March 31, 1992

Junior class consecutive games hit streak: 30 – Janna Venice, UConn Huskies; March 13-April 26, 1992

Senior class single game stolen bases: 6 – Ronda Carter, Akron Zips; April 24, 1992

Sophomore class winning percentage: 28-0 (100%) – Rebecca Aase, Florida State Seminoles

Junior class shutouts: 26 – Michele Granger, California Golden Bears

Team winning percentage: 54-2 (96%) – UCLA Bruins

== Awards ==
- Honda Sports Award Softball:

Lisa Fernandez, UCLA Bruins

YEAR	W	L	GP	GS	CG	SHO	SV	IP	H	R	ER	BB	SO	ERA	WHIP
1992	29	0	30	27	27	22	0	196.1	77	7	4	25	220	0.14	0.52

YEAR	G	AB	R	H	BA	RBI	HR	3B	2B	TB	SLG	BB	SO	SB	SBA
1992	56	177	47	71	.401	29	1	4	10	92	.520%	21	5	2	2

== All America Teams ==
The following players were members of the All-American Teams.

First Team

Position	Player	Class	School
P	Debbie Day	SR.	Arizona Wildcats
P	Melanie Roche	JR.	Oklahoma State Cowgirls
P	Michele Granger	JR.	California Golden Bears
C	Jody Miller-Pruitt	JR.	Arizona Wildcats
1B	Joanne Alcin	FR.	UCLA Bruins
2B	Dawn Melfi	SR.	USF Bulls
3B	Camille Spitaleri	SR.	Kansas Jayhawks
SS	Tiffany Tootle	JR.	South Carolina Gamecocks
OF	Yvonne Gutierrez	SR.	UCLA Bruins
OF	Dorsey Steamer	SR.	ULL Rajin' Cajuns
OF	Rachel Brown	SR.	Arizona State Sun Devils
UT	Lisa Fernandez	JR.	UCLA Bruins

Second Team

Position	Player	Class	School
P	Susie Parra	SO.	Arizona Wildcats
P	Stephani Williams	SO.	Kansas Jayhawks
P	Terry Carpenter	SR.	Fresno State Bulldogs
C	Terrie Cissna	JR.	Sacramento State Hornets
1B	Wendee Espinosa	JR.	Pacific Tigers
2B	Cathy Sconzo	SR.	ULL Rajin' Cajuns
3B	Lezlie Weiss	JR.	Minnesota Golden Gophers
SS	Christy Arterburn	SO.	Kansas Jayhawks
OF	Jamie Heggen	JR.	Arizona Wildcats
OF	Kathy Evans	FR.	UCLA Bruins
OF	Pam Stanley	SR.	Central Michigan Chippewas
UT	Gillian Boxx	FR.	California Golden Bears
AT-L	Toni Gutierrez	JR.	FSU Seminoles

Third Team

Position	Player	Class	School
P	Lori Harrigan	SR.	UNLV Rebels
P	Kyla Hall	SO.	ULL Rajin' Cajuns
P	Karen Snelgrove	SR.	Missouri Tigers
P	Kim Mizesko	SR.	Connecticut Huskies
C	Sherri Kuchinskas	JR.	UMass Minutewomen
1B	Amy Chellevold	FR.	Arizona Wildcats
2B	Linda Lunceford	SO.	Long Beach State 49ers
3B	Jackie Tawney	SO.	San Jose State Spartans
SS	Barb Marean	SR.	UMass Minutewomen
OF	Janna Venice	JR.	Connecticut Huskies
OF	Theresa Buscemi	SR.	North Carolina Tar Heels
OF	Patti Benedict	JR.	Michigan Wolverines
OF	Noleana Woodward	JR.	San Jose State Spartans
UT	Holly Aprile	SR.	UMass Minutewomen
AT-L	Denise DeWalt	JR.	Cal State Fullerton Titans
