= 2002 NCAA Division I softball season =

American college softball season

- Defending Champions: Arizona

Tournament

Women's College World Series
- Champions: California (1st title)
- Runners-up: Arizona (15th WCWS Appearance)
- Winning Coach: Diane Ninemire (1st title)
- WCWS MOP: Jocelyn Forest (California)

Seasons
- ← 2001 2003 →

The 2002 NCAA Division I softball season, play of college softball in the United States organized by the National Collegiate Athletic Association (NCAA) at the Division I level, began in February 2002. The season progressed through the regular season, many conference tournaments and championship series, and concluded with the 2002 NCAA Division I softball tournament and 2002 Women's College World Series. The Women's College World Series, consisting of the eight remaining teams in the NCAA Tournament and held in held in Oklahoma City at ASA Hall of Fame Stadium, ended on May 27, 2002.

== Conference standings ==
2002 Big 12 Conference softball standings
	Conf.				Overall
Team	W		L	PCT	W		L	PCT
No. 16 Texas ‍†‍‡‍^{y}	17	–	1	.944	50	–	13	.794
No. 8 Oklahoma ‍‍‍^{y}	14	–	2	.875	49	–	16	.754
No. 6 Nebraska ‍‍‍^{y}	11	–	5	.688	50	–	14	.781
Baylor ‍‍‍	10	–	8	.556	46	–	18	.719
No. 21 Texas A&M ‍‍‍^{y}	9	–	9	.500	40	–	18	.690
Oklahoma State ‍‍‍	8	–	10	.444	29	–	22	.569
Kansas ‍‍‍	7	–	11	.389	33	–	25	.569
Iowa State ‍‍‍	6	–	12	.333	19	–	25	.432
Missouri ‍‍‍	4	–	14	.222	29	–	33	.468
Texas Tech ‍‍‍	2	–	16	.111	13	–	40	.245
† – Conference champion ‡ – Tournament champion y – Invited to the NCAA tournament Rankings from NFCA

2002 Big Ten Conference softball standings
	Conf.						Overall
Team	W		L		T	PCT	W		L		T	PCT
No. 7 Michigan ‍†‍‡‍^{y}	15	–	3	–	0	.833	50	–	11	–	0	.820
No. 13 Ohio State ‍‍‍^{y}	16	–	4	–	0	.800	55	–	14	–	0	.797
Iowa ‍‍‍^{y}	12	–	4	–	0	.750	36	–	20	–	0	.643
Wisconsin ‍‍‍	11	–	6	–	0	.647	31	–	22	–	0	.585
Penn State ‍‍‍^{y}	10	–	9	–	0	.526	34	–	26	–	0	.567
Illinois ‍‍‍	10	–	9	–	0	.526	34	–	24	–	0	.586
Northwestern ‍‍‍	10	–	9	–	0	.526	24	–	18	–	1	.570
Minnesota ‍‍‍^{y}	7	–	8	–	0	.467	38	–	21	–	0	.644
Michigan State ‍‍‍	4	–	15	–	0	.211	24	–	35	–	0	.407
Purdue ‍‍‍	3	–	14	–	0	.176	33	–	26	–	0	.559
Indiana ‍‍‍	0	–	17	–	0	.000	13	–	31	–	1	.300
† – Conference champion ‡ – Tournament champion y – Invited to the NCAA tournament As of May 2002; Rankings from NFCA

2002 Pacific-10 Conference softball standings
	Conf.				Overall
Team	W		L	PCT	W		L	PCT
UCLA ‍†‍‍^{y}	18	–	3	.857	55	–	9	.859
Arizona ‍‍‍^{y}	15	–	6	.714	55	–	12	.821
Washington ‍‍‍^{y}	13	–	8	.619	46	–	18	.719
California ‍‍‍^{y}	12	–	9	.571	56	–	19	.747
Arizona State ‍‍‍^{y}	10	–	11	.476	46	–	20	.697
Stanford ‍‍‍^{y}	7	–	14	.333	44	–	20	.688
Oregon State ‍‍‍^{y}	7	–	14	.333	40	–	25	.615
Oregon ‍‍‍	2	–	19	.095	24	–	30	.444
† – Conference champion y – Invited to the NCAA tournament As of June 30, 2002; Rankings from Coaches' Poll

2002 Southland Conference softball standings
	Conf.						Overall
Team	W		L		T	PCT	W		L		T	PCT
Southwest Texas State ‍†‍‍	23	–	4	–	0	.852	37	–	22	–	0	.627
Northwestern State ‍‍‍^{y}	22	–	5	–	0	.815	45	–	25	–	0	.643
Texas–San Antonio ‍‍‍	19	–	8	–	0	.704	33	–	29	–	0	.532
McNeese State ‍‍‍	17	–	10	–	0	.630	23	–	28	–	0	.451
Southeastern Louisiana ‍‍‍	13	–	14	–	0	.481	30	–	27	–	0	.526
Louisiana–Monroe ‍‍‍	12	–	15	–	0	.444	20	–	32	–	0	.385
Texas–Arlington ‍‍‍	9	–	17	–	0	.346	16	–	30	–	1	.351
Sam Houston State ‍‍‍	9	–	18	–	0	.333	11	–	31	–	0	.262
Nicholls State ‍‍‍	7	–	20	–	0	.259	15	–	42	–	0	.263
Stephen F. Austin ‍‍‍	3	–	23	–	0	.115	9	–	51	–	0	.150
† – Conference champion y – Invited to the NCAA tournament As of May 20, 2002; Rankings from Coaches' Poll

== Women's College World Series ==
The 2002 NCAA Women's College World Series took place from May 23 to May 27, 2002 in Oklahoma City.

First round
1	UCLA	1
8	Florida State	2^{9}
4	California	4
5	Oklahoma	2
1	UCLA	2
5	Oklahoma	0
3	Arizona State	2
6	Michigan	1
7	Nebraska	0
2	Arizona	1
6	Michigan	0
7	Nebraska	1

Second round
8	Florida State	0
4	California	1
1	UCLA	1
3	Arizona State	2
3	Arizona State	0
2	Arizona	1^{8}
7	Nebraska	3
8	Florida State	4

Semifinals
4	California	3	–
3	Arizona State	0	–
2	Arizona	6^{11}	–
8	Florida State	2	–

Finals
4	California	6
2	Arizona	0

== Season leaders ==
Batting

- Batting average: .528 – Stacey Nuveman, UCLA Bruins
- RBIs: 75 – Jaime Clark, Washington Huskies
- Home runs: 21 – Leneah Manuma, Arizona Wildcats

Pitching

- Wins: 36-7 & 36-8 – Nicole Myers, Florida Atlantic Owls & Cat Osterman, Texas Longhorns
- ERA: 0.44 (22 ER/351.2 IP) – Jamie Southern, Fresno State Bulldogs
- Strikeouts: 554 – Cat Osterman, Texas Longhorns

== Records ==
NCAA Division I season walks: 108 – Veronica Nelson, California Golden Bears

NCAA Division I single game home runs: 4 – Jill Iacono, Saint Francis Red Flash; April 5, 2002

Sophomore class stolen bases: 73 – Nicole Barber, Georgia Bulldogs

Junior class doubles: 28 – Barbara Moody, Pacific Tigers

Senior class saves: 14 – Kellie Wilkerson, Mississippi State Bulldogs

Team season of stolen bases: 101-101 – DePaul Blue Demons

== Awards ==
- USA Softball Collegiate Player of the Year:

Stacey Nuveman, UCLA Bruins

YEAR	G	AB	R	H	BA	RBI	HR	3B	2B	TB	SLG	BB	SO	SB	SBA
2002	64	157	42	83	.528	64	20	3	15	164	1.044%	69	10	3	3

- Honda Sports Award Softball:

Jennie Finch, Arizona Wildcats

Year	W	L	GP	GS	CG	SHO	SV	IP	H	R	ER	BB	SO	ERA	WHIP
2002	34	6	43	39	36	21	1	273.1	136	46	38	82	366	0.97	0.80

YEAR	G	AB	R	H	BA	RBI	HR	3B	2B	TB	SLG	BB	SO	SB	SBA
2002	67	190	43	59	.310	56	16	0	8	115	.605%	37	36	1	1

== All America Teams ==
The following players were members of the All-American Teams.

First Team

Position	Player	Class	School
P	Jennie Finch	SR.	Arizona Wildcats
P	Keira Goerl	SO.	UCLA Bruins
P	Jamie Southern	FR.	Fresno State Bulldogs
C	Stacey Nuveman	SR.	UCLA Bruins
1B	Leneah Manuma	SO.	Arizona Wildcats
2B	Brandi Stuart	SR.	FSU Seminoles
3B	Lindsay Wood	SR.	UNI Panthers
SS	Natasha Watley	JR.	UCLA Bruins
OF	Jessica Mendoza	SR.	Stanford Cardinal
OF	Oli Keohohou	SO.	BYU Cougars
OF	Anna Smith	SR.	Ohio State Buckeyes
DP	Ashley Courtney	FR.	Alabama Crimson Tide
UT	Gina Oaks	JR.	Cal State Fullerton Titans
UT	Jaime Clark	JR.	Washington Huskies
AT-L	Britni Sneed	SR.	LSU Tigers
AT-L	Amanda Freed	SR.	UCLA Bruins
AT-L	Phelan Wright	SO.	Arizona State Sun Devils
AT-L	Jenny Topping	JR.	Cal State Fullerton Titans

Second Team

Position	Player	Class	School
P	Lindsay Chouinard	JR.	DePaul Blue Demons
P	Cat Osterman	FR.	Texas Longhorns
P	Nicole Myers	SR.	FAU Owls
C	Kristen Rivera	FR.	Washington Huskies
1B	Jackie McClain	SO.	Alabama Crimson Tide
2B	Liz Bouck	JR.	DePaul Blue Demons
3B	Stafanie Volpe	SR.	Michigan Wolverines
SS	Cara Blumfield	JR.	Boston College Eagles
OF	Nicole Barber	SO.	Georgia Bulldogs
OF	Trena Peel	SR.	LSU Tigers
OF	Tiffany Tolleson	JR.	North Carolina Tar Heels
DP	Geney Orris	SR.	UNLV Rebels
UT	Kristen Dennis	SR.	Virginia Cavaliers
AT-L	Wendy Allen	SO.	Ohio State Buckeyes
AT-L	Sarah Beeson	SR.	Stanford Cardinal
AT-L	Jocelyn Forest	SR.	California Golden Bears
AT-L	Becky McMurtry	JR.	ULL Ragin' Cajuns
AT-L	Kellie Wilkerson	SR.	Mississippi State Bulldogs

Third Team

Position	Player	Class	School
P	Cindy Ball	SR.	Pacific Tigers
P	Jennifer Hadley	SR.	UMass Minutewomen
P	Marissa Young	JR.	Michigan Wolverines
C	Stacy Roth	SR.	Ohio State Buckeyes
1B	Kim Wendland	FR.	Georgia Bulldogs
2B	Jennifer Link	JR.	Ohio State Buckeyes
3B	Andrea Loman	JR.	Notre Dame Fighting Irish
SS	Tara Knudsen	SO.	Georgia Tech Yellowjackets
OF	Yasmin Mossadeghi	SR.	Cal State Fullerton Titans
OF	Christi Musser	SO.	Kansas Jayhawks
OF	Kim Ogee	JR.	Nebraska Cornhuskers
DP	Claire Sua	SO.	UCLA Bruins
UT	Christina Enea	FR.	Oklahoma Sooners
AT-L	Selena Collins	JR.	Texas A&M Aggies
AT-L	Candace Harper	SR.	California Golden Bears
AT-L	Kristin Johnson	JR.	Iowa Hawkeyes
AT-L	Edel Leyden	SR.	UIC Flames
AT-L	Jarrah Myers	SR.	Notre Dame Fighting Irish
AT-L	Nichole Thompson	SR.	Arizona State Sun Devils
