= 1992 NCAA Division I softball tournament =

- Teams: 20
- Finals site: ASA Hall of Fame Stadium; Oklahoma City, Oklahoma
- Champions: UCLA (7th (8th overall) title)
- Runner-up: Arizona (9th WCWS Appearance)
- Winning coach: Sharron Backus & Sue Enquist (7th (8th overall) & 3rd title)

The 1992 NCAA Division I softball tournament was the eleventh annual tournament to determine the national champion of NCAA women's collegiate softball. Held during May 1992, twenty Division I college softball teams contested the championship. The tournament featured eight regionals of either two or three teams, each in a double elimination format. The 1992 Women's College World Series was held in Oklahoma City, Oklahoma from May 23 through May 26 and marked the conclusion of the 1992 NCAA Division I softball season. UCLA won their seventh championship by defeating defending champions Arizona 2–0 in the final game.

== Regionals ==
=== Regional No. 1 ===
Team		G1	G2	G3
–	UCLA	1	7^{10}	—
–	Utah	0	2	—

- UCLA qualifies for WCWS, 2–0

=== Regional No. 2 ===
Team		G1	G2	G3
–	Arizona	1	8	—
–	Michigan	0	0	—

- Arizona qualifies for WCWS, 2–0

=== Regional No. 3 ===
Team		G1	G2	G3
–	Fresno State	3	6	—
–	Cal State Northridge	0	0	—

- Fresno State qualifies for WCWS, 2–0

=== Regional No. 4 ===
Team		G1	G2	G3
–	California	1	6	—
–	San Jose State	0	1	—

- California qualifies for WCWS, 2–0

=== Regional No. 5 ===
==== First elimination round ====
- Long Beach State 2, Toledo 0
- Cal State Fullerton 1, Toledo 0
- Cal State Fullerton 3, Long Beach State 2^{11}

==== Second elimination round ====
Team		G1	G2
–	Long Beach State	2	4
–	Cal State Fullerton	1	0

- Long Beach State qualifies for WCWS, 3–1

=== Regional No. 6 ===
==== First elimination round ====
- Kansas 4, Western Illinois 0
- Oklahoma State 2, Western Illinois 0

==== Second elimination round ====
Team		G1	G2
–	Kansas	1^{8}	4
–	Oklahoma State	0	0

- Kansas qualifies for WCWS, 3–0

=== Regional No. 7 ===
==== First elimination round ====
- Connecticut 5, UMass 1
- UMass 1, Utah State 0
- Connecticut 1, Utah State 0^{8}

==== Second elimination round ====
Team		G1	G2
–	UMass	10^{5}	3
–	Connecticut	0	0

- UMass qualifies for WCWS, 3–1

=== Regional No. 8 ===
==== First elimination round ====
- Florida State 1, Southwestern Louisiana 0^{10}
- Southwestern Louisiana 1, UNLV 0
- Florida State 4, UNLV 0;

==== Second elimination round ====
Team		G1	G2
–	Florida State	1	—
–	Southwestern Louisiana	0	—

- Florida State qualifies for WCWS, 3–0

== Women's College World Series ==
=== Participants ===
- Arizona
- California
- Florida State
- Fresno State
- Kansas
- Long Beach State
- UCLA
- UMass

=== Game results ===
==== Bracket ====
Upper round 1
UCLA	4
UMass	0
Florida State	0
California	3
Fresno State	4^{8}
Kansas	1
Long Beach State	1
Arizona	0

Upper round 2
UCLA	10^{5}
California	0
Fresno State	4
Long Beach State	0
Lower round 1
UMass	4
Florida State	2
Kansas	0
Arizona	1^{17}

Upper final
UCLA	4
Fresno State	0
Lower round 2
Long Beach State	1
UMass	2^{10}
California	1
Arizona	2

Semifinals
UCLA	11^{5}
UMass	1
Fresno State	0
Arizona	1

Final
UCLA	2
Arizona	0

=== Championship Game ===
School	Top Batter	Stats.
UCLA Bruins	Jennifer Brewster (RF)	1-3 2RBIs HR
Arizona Wildcats	Amy Chellevold (1B)	3-3

School	Pitcher	IP	H	R	ER	BB	SO	AB
UCLA Bruins	Lisa Fernandez (W)	7.0	4	0	0	1	6	22
Arizona Wildcats	Debby Day (L)	6.1	6	2	2	1	1	21

=== All-Tournament Team ===
The following players were named to the All-Tournament Team

Pos	Name	School
P	Lisa Fernandez	UCLA
C	Kelly Inouye	UCLA
1B	Amy Chellevold	Arizona
2B	Michelle Bento	Fresno State
3B	Susie Duarte	Arizona
SS	Kim Maher	Fresno State
OF	Yvonne Gutierrez	UCLA
OF	Kathi Evans	UCLA
AL	Susie Parra	Arizona
AL	Holly Aprile	UMass
AL	Debby Day	Arizona

== See also ==
- 1992 NCAA Division II softball tournament
- 1992 NCAA Division III softball tournament
- 1992 NAIA softball tournament
- 1992 NCAA Division I baseball tournament
