= Tammy Lohmann =

American softball coach

Current position
- Title: Head coach
- Team: San Jose State
- Conference: MWC
- Record: 98–137 (.417)

Biographical details
- Education: Arizona State

Playing career
- 1993–1997: Arizona State

Coaching career (HC unless noted)
- 1999–2002: Bradley (asst.)
- 2003–2005: Wisconsin (asst.)
- 2006–2015: California (asst.)
- 2016–2020: California (AHC)
- 2020: California (Interim HC)
- 2021–present: San Jose State

Head coaching record
- Overall: 111–148 (.429)

Accomplishments and honors

Awards
- Orange County Softball Hall of Fame (2020)

Tammy Lohmann is an American collegiate softball shortstop and first baseman and current head coach for San Jose State. She was formerly an assistant coach and interim head coach at California.

== Coaching career ==
=== Wisconsin ===
On September 11, 2002, Lohmann was announced as a new assistant coach for the Wisconsin softball program.

=== California ===
On September 1, 2005, Lohmann was named assistant coach for the California Golden Bears softball team. On March 3, 2020, she was named interim head coach at California when longtime head coach Diane Ninemire stepped down as head coach mid-season.

=== San Jose State ===
On September 3, 2020, Lohmann was named head coach for the San Jose State Spartans softball team.

== Head coaching record ==
=== College ===
Record table
Season	Team	Overall	Conference	Standing	Postseason
California Golden Bears (Pac-12 Conference) (2020)
2020	California	13–11 (Note: Diane Ninemire stepped down after the first 19 games of the season. Lohmann served as acting head coach for the remainder of the season.)	0–0		Season canceled due to COVID-19
California:		13–11 (.542)	0–0 (–)		
San Jose State Spartans (Mountain West Conference) (2021–present)
2021	San Jose State	9–23	5–13		
2022	San Jose State	22–29	7–17	T–7th	
2023	San Jose State	27–30	11–11	4th	NISC
2024	San Jose State	18–27	7–14	8th	
2025	San Jose State	22–28	9–13	6th	
San Jose State:		98–137 (.417)	39–68 (.364)		
Total:		111–148 (.429)			
National champion Postseason invitational champion Conference regular season champion Conference regular season and conference tournament champion Division regular season champion Division regular season and conference tournament champion Conference tournament champion
