= Chelsea Spencer =

American softball player

Biographical details
- Born: May 15, 1983 (age 43); San Leandro, California, U.S.
- Education: University of California, Berkeley (BS)

Playing career
- 2002–2005: California
- 2005: New York/New Jersey Juggernaut
- 2006–2008: Philadelphia Force
- 2009: Rockford Thunder
- 2010: Tennessee Diamonds
- Position: Shortstop

Coaching career (HC unless noted)
- 2006: Alameda HS (JV HC)
- 2008: Holy Names (GA)
- 2007–2010: Chabot Community College
- 2011–2012: Michigan State (asst.)
- 2013–2018: Oregon (asst.)
- 2019–2020: Texas (asst.)
- 2021–2025: California

Head coaching record
- Overall: 117–87–2 (.573)

Chelsea Spencer (born May 15, 1983) is an American former professional softball player, who most recently served as the head coach at California. She played college softball as a shortstop for the California Golden Bears in the Pac-12 Conference, and helped them to the 2002 Women's College World Series national title and two runner-up finishes in 2003 and 2004.

== Playing career ==
After graduating from Arroyo High School in San Lorenzo, California, Spencer played softball at the University of California, Berkeley (UCB) and started at shortstop from 2002 to 2005. During her time at California, she helped the Golden Bears to 4 straight Women's College World Series berths and a Pac-10 Title. Spencer graduated from UCB with a degree in American Studies in 2005.

Spencer was drafted twenty-second overall in the 2005 NPF Draft by the New York/New Jersey Juggernaut of the National Pro Fastpitch league and played for several teams from 2005 to 2010, and won a title in 2009.

== Coaching career ==
=== Texas ===
On July 10, 2018, Spencer was announced as an assistant coach for the Texas Longhorns softball team.

=== California ===
On May 20, 2020, Spencer was announced as the new head coach for the California Golden Bears softball team. She is the first openly LGBT head coach to lead the Cal program.

On June 23, 2025, Spencer resigned after five seasons as head coach at California. She compiled a record of 153–108–2 and reached three consecutive NCAA regionals.

== Statistics ==
California Golden Bears
YEAR	G	AB	R	H	BA	RBI	HR	3B	2B	TB	SLG	BB	SO	SB	SBA
2002	75	228	23	57	.250	32	3	0	15	81	.355%	16	29	1	1
2003	69	200	20	48	.240	25	2	1	3	59	.295%	7	25	4	4
2004	66	190	31	62	.326	36	8	0	9	95	.500%	19	25	17	19
2005	67	191	37	52	.272	25	2	0	9	67	.351%	19	25	15	18
TOTALS	277	809	111	219	.270	118	15	1	36	302	.373%	61	104	37	42

== Head coaching record ==
=== College ===
Record table
Season	Team	Overall	Conference	Standing	Postseason
California Golden Bears (Pac-12 Conference) (2021–2024)
2021	California	17–20	3–11	8th	
2022	California	28–27–1	8–16	T–8th	
2023	California	35–21–1	9–14–1	6th	NCAA Regional
2024	California	37–19	9–13	7th	NCAA Regional
California (Pac-12):		117–87–2 (.573)	29–54–1 (.351)		
California Golden Bears (Atlantic Coast Conference) (2025–2025)
2025	California	37–21	11–13	9th	NCAA Regional
California (ACC):		37–21 (.638)	11–13 (.458)		
Total:		154–108–2 (.587)			
National champion Postseason invitational champion Conference regular season champion Conference regular season and conference tournament champion Division regular season champion Division regular season and conference tournament champion Conference tournament champion
