= Diane Ninemire =

American softball coach

Biographical details
- Born: February 12, 1957 (age 69); Omaha, Nebraska, U.S.

Playing career

Softball
- 1977: Midland Lutheran
- 1978–1980: Nebraska–Omaha

Women's basketball
- 1977–1980: Nebraska–Omaha
- Positions: Shortstop, left fielder, guard

Coaching career (HC unless noted)
- 1981–1982: Texas Woman's
- 1983–1987: California (asst.)
- 1988–2020: California

Head coaching record
- Overall: 1,355-687-1 (.663)
- Tournaments: NCAA Division I: 98–66 (.598)

Accomplishments and honors

Championships
- 2× Pac-10/12 (2005, 2012); Women's College World Series (2002)

Awards
- NFCA Hall of Fame (2009); NFCA Coaching Staff of the Year (2002); 2× Pac-10/12 Coach of the Year (1991, 2012)

Diane Lynn Ninemire (born February 12, 1957) is an American softball coach. She was the head coach of the California Golden Bears softball team from 1988 until March 3, 2020 when she resigned—effective immediately—for health reasons. When she resigned, she ranked ninth all-time in wins in college softball history with a career record of 1,355-687-1.

== Early life and education ==
Born in Omaha, Nebraska, Ninemire grew up in nearby Ralston and graduated from Ralston High School. Playing softball and basketball at Midland Lutheran College (now Midland University) in the 1976–77 season, Ninemire transferred to the University of Nebraska–Omaha after one year, lettering in softball and basketball there as well. On the Nebraska–Omaha softball team, Ninemire played at shortstop and left fielder. Ninemire graduated from Nebraska–Omaha in 1980 and completed a master's degree in physical education at Texas Woman's University in 1987.

== Coaching career ==
In 1981 and 1982, Ninemire was an assistant coach under Donna Terry at Texas Woman's University. Ninemire then followed Terry to the University of California, Berkeley (Cal) in 1983. Ninemire became interim head coach in 1988 after Terry took a medical leave of absence and continued long term after Terry's death in June 1988.

When she resigned, Ninemire had a 1,355-687-1 record in 31 seasons. Cal won the 2002 Women's College World Series, the first national championship for any women's sports team at the school. Ninemire won Coach of the Year honors from the Pac-10 (later Pac-12) Conference in 1991 and 2012, NFCA Coaching Staff of the Year honors in 2002, and an NFCA Hall of Fame induction in 2009. The 2005 team shared the Pac-10 championship, and the 2012 team won the inaugural Pac-12 title.

== Head coaching record ==
Record table
Season	Team	Overall	Conference	Standing	Postseason
California Golden Bears (Pacific-10/Pac-12 Conference) (1988–2020)
1988	California	39–24	7–11	5th	NCAA Regionals
1989	California	38–26	10–10	4th	NCAA Regionals
1990	California	41–28	9–9	T–3rd	NCAA Regionals
1991	California	48–20	14–6	3rd	NCAA Regionals
1992	California	47–16	8–8	3rd	Women's College World Series
1993	California	37–20	12–10	4th	NCAA Regionals
1994	California	40–21	10–12	5th	NCAA Regionals
1995	California	41–21	20–8	3rd	NCAA Regionals
1996	California	41–22	14–12	4th	Women's College World Series
1997	California	36–26	13–14	4th	NCAA Regionals
1998	California	35–27	12–14	4th	NCAA Regionals
1999	California	51–22	13–14	5th	Women's College World Series
2000	California	49–25	6–15	T–7th	Women's College World Series
2001	California	54–18	6–14	7th	Women's College World Series
2002	California	56–19	12–9	4th	WCWS Champions
2003	California	49–20	10–11	3rd	WCWS Runners-up
2004	California	53–13	13–8	T–2nd	WCWS Runners-up
2005	California	52–15	13–8	T–1st	Women's College World Series
2006	California	48–14	12–9	3rd	NCAA Super Regionals
2007	California	34–32	7–14	8th	NCAA Regionals
2008	California	43–27	7–14	5th	NCAA Super Regionals
2009	California	38–20	10–10	5th	NCAA Super Regionals
2010	California	44–19	10–11	T–4th	NCAA Super Regionals
2011	California	45–13	15–6	2nd	Women's College World Series
2012	California	58–7	21–2	1st	Women's College World Series
2013	California	38–19	10–14	T–5th	NCAA Regionals
2014	California	23–29	4–18	9th	
2015	California	39–18	10–14	7th	NCAA Regionals
2016	California	33–24–1	11–11–1	6th	NCAA Regionals
2017	California	32–24	6–17	8th	NCAA Regionals
2018	California	35–21	7–16	7th	NCAA Regionals
2019	California	28-27	5-18	8th	
2020	California	10-9 (Note: Ninemire stepped down after the first 19 games of the season. Tammy Lohmann served as acting head coach for the remainder of the season.)	0-0	NA	NA
California:		1,355-687-1 (.663)	337–367–1 (.479)		
Total:		1,355-687-1 (.663)			
National champion Postseason invitational champion Conference regular season champion Conference regular season and conference tournament champion Division regular season champion Division regular season and conference tournament champion Conference tournament champion

== See also ==
- List of college softball coaches with 1,000 wins
