= 2002 NCAA Division I softball tournament =

- Teams: 48
- Finals site: ASA Hall of Fame Stadium; Oklahoma City, Oklahoma
- Champions: California (1st title)
- Runner-up: Arizona (15th WCWS Appearance)
- Winning coach: Diane Ninemire (1st title)
- MOP: Jocelyn Forest (California)

The 2002 NCAA Division I softball tournament was the twenty-first annual tournament to determine the national champion of NCAA women's collegiate softball. Held during May 2002, forty-eight Division I college softball teams contested the championship. The tournament featured eight regionals of six teams, each in a double elimination format. The 2002 Women's College World Series was held in Oklahoma City, Oklahoma from May 23 through May 27 and marked the conclusion of the 2002 NCAA Division I softball season. California won their first NCAA championship by defeating Arizona 6–0 in the final game. California pitcher Jocelyn Forest was named Women's College World Series Most Outstanding Player.

== Regionals ==
=== Regional No. 1 ===
Opening Round

- UCLA defeated Liberty, 3–0.
- Georgia defeated UMBC, 2–1.
- South Carolina defeated Eastern Kentucky, 2–1 (8 innings).

Loser's Bracket

- UMBC defeated Liberty, 7–1. Liberty eliminated.
- Eastern Kentucky defeated UMBC, 6–1, UMBC eliminated.

Semifinals and Finals

- Georgia defeated South Carolina, 1–0.
- UCLA defeated Eastern Kentucky, 10–0 (5 innings). Eastern Kentucky eliminated.
- UCLA defeated Georgia, 2–1 (8 innings).
- South Carolina defeated Georgia, 9–3. Georgia eliminated.
- South Carolina defeated UCLA, 2–1.
- UCLA defeated South Carolina, 1–0.

UCLA advances to WCWS.

=== Regional No. 2 ===
Opening Round

- Arizona defeated Boston University, 4–1.
- DePaul defeated Penn State, 3–1.
- Minnesota defeated Princeton, 2–1.

Loser's Bracket

- Penn State defeated Boston University, 5–1. Boston University eliminated.
- Penn State defeated Princeton, 3–0. Princeton eliminated.

Semifinals and Finals

- DePaul defeated Minnesota, 2–0 (12 innings).
- Arizona defeated Penn State, 4–3. Penn State eliminated.
- Arizona defeated DePaul, 2–0.
- DePaul defeated Minnesota, 5–3. Minnesota eliminated.
- DePaul defeated Arizona, 6–0.
- Arizona defeated DePaul, 8–0.

Arizona advances to WCWS.

=== Regional No. 3 ===
Opening Round

- LSU defeated Northwestern State, 3–2 (10 innings).
- Arizona State defeated Mississippi State, 4–1.
- UMass defeated Louisiana–Lafayette, 5–3 (13 innings).

Loser's Bracket

- Mississippi State defeated Northwestern State, 9–6. Northwestern State eliminated.
- Louisiana–Lafayette defeated Mississippi State, 10–3. Mississippi State eliminated.

Semifinals and Finals

- Arizona State defeated UMass, 1–0.
- LSU defeated Louisiana–Lafayette, 5–2. Louisiana–Lafayette eliminated.
- Arizona State defeated LSU, 3–2 (8 innings).
- LSU defeated UMass, 1–0. UMass eliminated.
- Arizona State defeated LSU, 4–1.

Arizona State advances to WCWS.

=== Regional No. 4 ===
Opening Round

- Cal State Fullerton defeated Evansville, 3–0.
- Stanford defeated Pacific, 7–0.
- California defeated Fresno State, 2–1 (10 innings).

Loser's Bracket

- Pacific defeated Evansville, 6–0. Evansville eliminated.
- Fresno State defeated Pacific, 1–0. Pacific eliminated.

Semifinals and Finals

- California defeated Stanford, 1–0.
- Cal State Fullerton defeated Fresno State, 1–0. Fresno State eliminated.
- California defeated Cal State Fullerton, 4–2.
- Cal State Fullerton defeated Stanford, 4–1. Stanford eliminated.
- California defeated Cal State Fullerton, 1–0.

California advances to WCWS.

=== Regional No. 5 ===
Opening Round

- Texas defeated Army, 4–0.
- Oklahoma defeated Utah, 6–0.
- Texas A&M defeated Arkansas, 6–2.

Loser's Bracket

- Army defeated Utah, 2–0. Utah eliminated.
- Arkansas defeated Army, 2–0. Army eliminated.

Semifinals and Finals

- Oklahoma defeated Texas A&M, 7–0.
- Texas defeated Arkansas, 6–2. Arkansas eliminated.
- Oklahoma defeated Texas, 4–1.
- Texas A&M defeated Texas, 2–1. Texas eliminated.
- Oklahoma defeated Texas A&M, 8–1.

Oklahoma advances to WCWS.

=== Regional No. 6 ===
Opening Round

- Washington defeated Oakland, 8–0 (5 innings).
- Michigan defeated Canisius, 5–0.
- Ohio State defeated Central Michigan, 7–0.

Loser's Bracket

- Oakland defeated Canisius, 3–1. Canisius eliminated.
- Central Michigan defeated Oakland, 2–1. Oakland eliminated.

Semifinals and Finals

- Michigan defeated Ohio State, 3–0.
- Washington defeated Central Michigan, 4–1. Central Michigan eliminated.
- Michigan defeated Washington, 6–5.
- Ohio State defeated Washington, 2–1. Washington eliminated.
- Michigan defeated Ohio State, 4–0.

Michigan advances to WCWS.

=== Regional No. 7 ===
Opening Round

- Nebraska defeated UIC, 1–0.
- Oregon State defeated Wisconsin, 1–0.
- Notre Dame defeated Iowa, 3–2.

Loser's Bracket

- UIC defeated Wisconsin, 2–0. Wisconsin eliminated.
- Iowa defeated UIC, 3–1. UIC eliminated.

Semifinals and Finals

- Oregon State defeated Notre Dame, 2–0.
- Nebraska defeated Iowa, 3–0. Iowa eliminated.
- Nebraska defeated Oregon State, 7–0.
- Notre Dame defeated Oregon State, 2–0. Oregon State eliminated.
- Nebraska defeated Notre Dame, 5–3.

Nebraska advances to WCWS.

=== Regional No. 8 ===
Opening Round

- Chattanooga Mocs defeated Florida Atlantic, 4–3.
- Georgia Tech defeated Alabama, 3–1 (10 innings).
- Florida State defeated Auburn, 2–1.

Loser's Bracket

- Florida Atlantic defeated Alabama, 2–1. Alabama eliminated.
- Florida Atlantic defeated Auburn, 4–2. Auburn eliminated.

Semifinals and Finals

- Georgia Tech defeated Florida State, 7–0.
- Chattanooga defeated Florida Atlantic, 6–1. Florida Atlantic eliminated.
- Georgia Tech defeated Chattanooga, 3–0.
- Florida State defeated Chattanooga, 1–0 (8 innings). Chattanooga eliminated.
- Florida State defeated Georgia Tech, 3–0.
- Florida State defeated Georgia Tech, 6–1.

Florida State advances to WCWS.

== Women's College World Series ==
=== Participants ===
School	Conference	Record	Head coach	WCWS appearances† (Including 2002 WCWS)
Arizona	Pac-10	52–11	Mike Candrea	15
Arizona State	Pac-10	44–18	Linda Wells	4
California	Pac-10	52–19	Diane Ninemire	8
Florida State	ACC	53–18	JoAnne Graf	6
Michigan	Big Ten	50–9	Carol Hutchins	6
Nebraska	Big 12	49–12	Rhonda Revelle	6*
Oklahoma	Big 12	49–14	Patty Gasso	3
UCLA	Pac-10	54–7	Sue Enquist	19**

*: Excludes Nebraska's vacated 1985 WCWS participation.
**: Excludes UCLA's vacated 1995 WCWS participation.

†: Excludes results of the pre-NCAA Women's College World Series of 1969 through 1981.

=== Results ===
==== Bracket ====
First round
1	UCLA	1
8	Florida State	2^{9}
4	California	4
5	Oklahoma	2
1	UCLA	2
5	Oklahoma	0
3	Arizona State	2
6	Michigan	1
7	Nebraska	0
2	Arizona	1
6	Michigan	0
7	Nebraska	1

Second round
8	Florida State	0
4	California	1
1	UCLA	1
3	Arizona State	2
3	Arizona State	0
2	Arizona	1^{8}
7	Nebraska	3
8	Florida State	4

Semifinals
4	California	3	–
3	Arizona State	0	–
2	Arizona	6^{11}	–
8	Florida State	2	–

Finals
4	California	6
2	Arizona	0

==== Game results ====
Date	Game	Winner	Score	Loser	Notes
5/23/2002	Game 01	Florida State	2 - 1	UCLA	9 Innings
5/23/2002	Game 02	California	4 - 2	Oklahoma	
5/23/2002	Game 03	Arizona State	2 - 1	Michigan	
5/23/2002	Game 04	Arizona	1 - 0	Nebraska	
5/24/2002	Game 05	California	1 - 0	Florida State	
5/24/2002	Game 06	Arizona	1 - 0	Arizona State	8 Innings
5/25/2002	Game 07	UCLA	2 - 0	Oklahoma	Oklahoma eliminated
5/25/2002	Game 08	Nebraska	1 - 0	Michigan	Michigan eliminated
5/25/2002	Game 09	Arizona State	2 - 1	UCLA	UCLA eliminated
5/25/2002	Game 10	Florida State	4 - 3	Nebraska	Nebraska eliminated
5/26/2002	Game 11	California	3 - 0	Arizona State	Arizona State eliminated If Necessary Game (Game 13) not necessary
5/26/2002	Game 12	Arizona	6 - 2	Florida State	11 Innings Florida State eliminated If Necessary Game (Game 14) not necessary
5/26/2002	Game 13	--	--	--	Arizona State / California If Necessary Game (Game 13) not necessary
5/26/2002	Game 14	--	--	--	Florida State / Arizona If Necessary Game (Game 14) not necessary
5/27/2002	Championship game	California	6 - 0	Arizona	California Wins 2002 WCWS

==== Championship game ====
School	Top Batter	Stats.
California	Jessica Pamanian (2B)	2-3 3RBIs 2B
Arizona	Mackenzie Vandergeest (C)	1-3 K

School	Pitcher	IP	H	R	ER	BB	SO	AB	BF
California	Jocelyn Forest (W)	7.0	1	0	0	3	8	20	25
Arizona	Jennie Finch (L)	6.2	5	6	6	8	2	23	33
Arizona	Jenny Gladding	0.1	1	0	0	1	0	2	3

=== All-Tournament Team ===
The following players were members of the All-Tournament Team:

Position	Player	Class	School
Pitcher	Erica Beach	Senior	Arizona State
Pitcher	Jennie Finch	Senior	Arizona
Pitcher	Keira Goerl	Sophomore	UCLA
Pitcher	Leslie Malerich	Senior	Florida State
Catcher	Stacey Nuveman	Senior	UCLA
1st Base	Veronica Nelson	Junior	California
1st Base	Leneah Manuma	Sophomore	Arizona
Shortstop	Chelsea Spencer	Freshman	California
Shortstop	Natasha Watley	Junior	UCLA
3rd Base	Jackie Coburn	Freshman	Arizona
Outfield	Kristin Farber	Sophomore	Arizona State
Most Outstanding Player	Jocelyn Forest	Senior	California
