= Deborah Gebhardt =

American basketball coach

Deborah L Gebhardt is an American scientist focusing on issues related to health, fitness and workplace health safety. Gebhardt was also a college basketball and softball coach. Gebhardt was the first coach for both the softball and women's basketball teams at the University of California, Berkeley. She coached Purdue's first women's basketball team. She was a physical education teacher prior to becoming the head coach in the 1973–74 season. She coached one year and then left Purdue. The Purdue team finished 8–8 and finished third in the Big Ten tournament.

== Biography ==
Deborah Gebhardt attended Hazleton High School, and later graduated from East Stroudsburg State in 1969. She earned her master's degree from the University of Arizona. After earning her master's degree, she started teaching at the University of California, Berkeley. Gebhardt also officiated basketball for nine years. Gebhardt received her PhD in physical education from the University of Maryland Department of Kinesiology in 1979.

In the 1980s, she worked as a vice president for the Advanced Research Resources Organization (ARRO), a company that created employment tests. She has been published in American Psychologist, the Journal of Applied Psychology, Human Performance, Ergonomics, and other publications.

Gebhardt received a Myers Award in 2006 from the Society for Industrial and Organizational Psychology (SIOP).

== Coaching career ==
=== Cal ===
Deborah Gebhardt coached the University of California, Berkeley (Cal) women's basketball team during the 1973–74 season. Gebhardt was the first ever women's basketball coach at Cal. She was the athletic director for women's sports in 1972, and also taught physical education at the university.

Gebhardt was also the first coach ever for the softball team, coaching for two years: 1972 and 1973. Her teams finished with a record of 2–4 both years. In 1973, the team finished fourth in the NCIAC.

=== Purdue ===
Gebhardt began her career at Purdue University as a physical education teacher in 1973. She coached both tennis and women's basketball when they were still considered clubs.

The Boilermakers first win came in overtime against Illinois, winning 78 to 74 on December 2, 1975. Natasha Cender recorded 11.6 rebounds per game, which as of 2001 was still a school record. The team finished in third place in the Big Ten tournament, and ended the season with an 8–8 record.

== Head coaching record ==
Record table
Season	Team	Overall	Conference	Standing	Postseason
Cal (NCIAC) (1973–1974)
1973–74	Cal	5–5	2–3	–	–
Cal:		5–5 (.500)	2–3		
Purdue University (Independent) (1975–1976)
1975–76	Purdue	8–8	–	–	–
Purdue:		8–8 (.500)	–		
Total:		13–13 (.500)			
National champion Postseason invitational champion Conference regular season champion Conference regular season and conference tournament champion Division regular season champion Division regular season and conference tournament champion Conference tournament champion
