= California Golden Bears softball =

College softball team representing the University of California, Berkeley

- 2025 California Golden Bears softball team
- University: University of California, Berkeley
- Head coach: Steve Singleton (1st season)
- Conference: ACC
- Location: Berkeley, California, US
- Home stadium: Levine-Fricke Field (capacity: 1,204)
- Nickname: Golden Bears
- Colors: Blue and gold

NCAA Tournament champions
- 2002

NCAA WCWS runner-up
- 2003, 2004

NCAA WCWS appearances
- 1986, 1992, 1996, 1999, 2000, 2001, 2002, 2003, 2004, 2005, 2011, 2012

AIAW WCWS appearances
- 1980, 1981, 1982

NCAA Tournament appearances
- 1986, 1987, 1988, 1989, 1990, 1991, 1992, 1993, 1994, 1995, 1996, 1997, 1998, 1999, 2000, 2001, 2002, 2003, 2004, 2005, 2006, 2007, 2008, 2009, 2010, 2011, 2012, 2013, 2015, 2016, 2017, 2018, 2023, 2024, 2025

Regular-season conference championships
- 1979, 1980, 1981, 1986, 1987, 2005, 2012

The California Golden Bears softball team is the college softball team representing the University of California, Berkeley in NCAA Division I. The team plays its home games at Levine-Fricke Field, which is located in Strawberry Canyon near California Memorial Stadium. While the stadium was built in 1995, it is not up to the standards of the NCAA, and therefore cannot host NCAA tournament games. California softball is one of the most consistently successful programs at the school, having appeared in 28 consecutive NCAA tournaments from 1986 through 2013, and winning a national championship in 2002.

== History ==
The California Golden Bears softball team has been one of the most consistently successful programs at the University of California since its inaugural season in 1972. Through the program's first forty years (1972–2011), it has had a record of 1,445–705–3 which is a .672 win percentage. The Bears are consistently ranked in the top 25, have reached the postseason for 27 straight years, have reached the Women's College World Series 14 times (11 NCAA, 3 AIAW), and have won 1 Women's College World Series Championship in 2002.

The current head coach is Diane Ninemire, who is currently in her 25th season leading California's softball program. Ninemire holds the California school record for most all-time wins by a coach, and has an overall record of 1,059–509 (.675). The current home field of the California Golden Bears softball program is Levine-Fricke Field located in Strawberry Canyon behind California Memorial Stadium and Witter Rugby Field and the programs offices are located in the Simpson Center for Student Athlete High Performance.

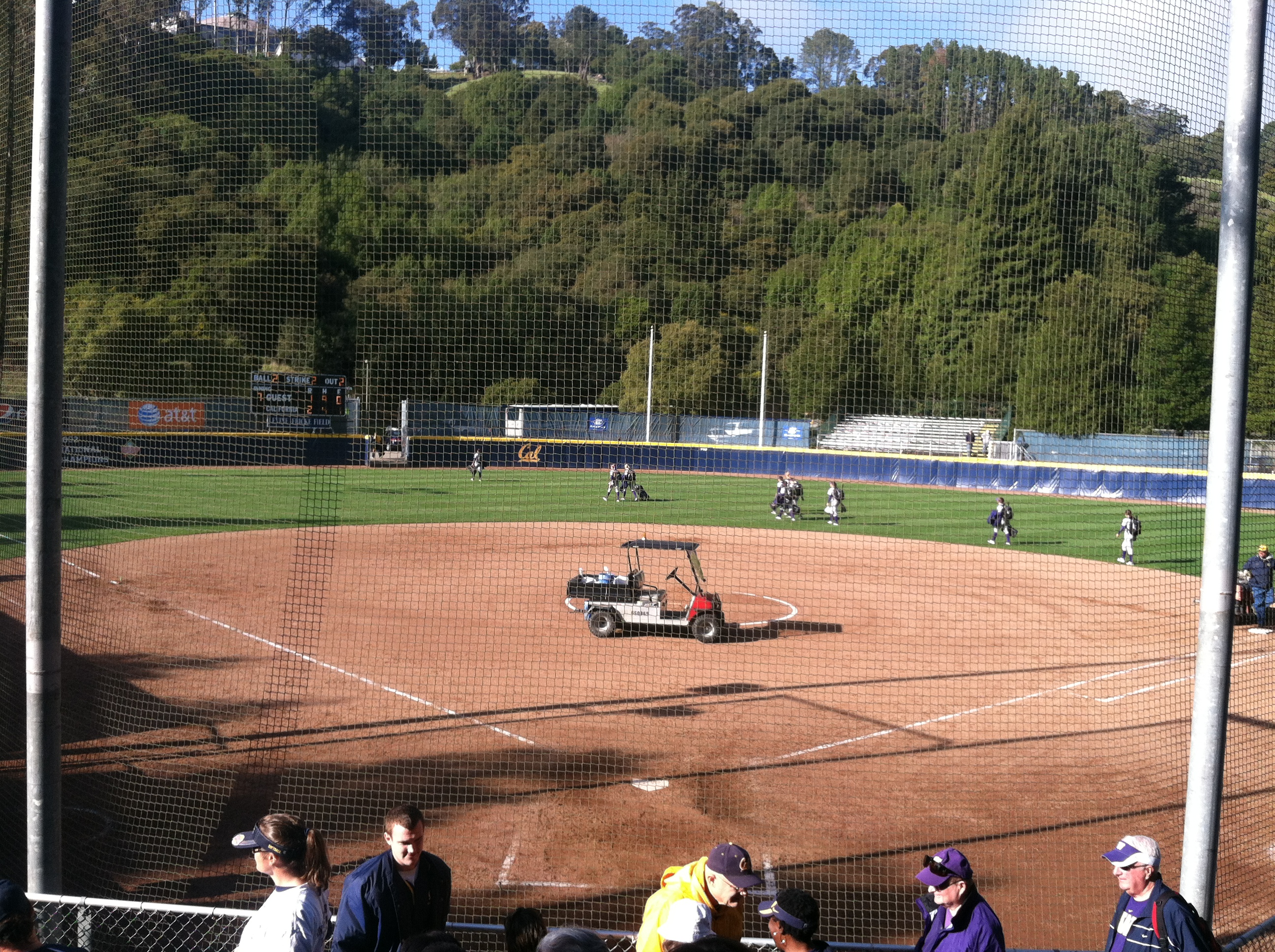
Levine-Fricke Field, home of California softball, pictured in 2012

Levine-Fricke Field opened in 1995 with a capacity of 500 permanent seats and it was announced by the athletic department that the stadium had expanded to 1,204 seats on April 11, 2012.

Despite the fact that Levine-Fricke Field is relatively new (compared to California's other facilities), it is not up to the standards needed to host NCAA Tournament games so even though California has received a national seed multiple times in its history, they have never been able to host a regional or super regional. Before moving into Levine-Fricke Field, softball played at a facility called Strawberry Field right next to the current stadium where Witter Rugby Field is now located, before that, the team played at Hearst Field (now the Hearst Field Annex) near the Hearst Gymnasium.

=== 2002 season ===
In 2002, the California Golden Bears softball program won its first national championship after defeating the defending national champion Arizona Wildcats on May 27, 2002. There were high expectations heading into the 2002 campaign after reaching the Women's College World Series from 1999 to 2001 and with the Bears ranked #5 in the preseason poll. They remained in the national rankings (never falling out of the top 10) until they were the unanimous #1 after clinching the national championship and the Bears finished the 2002 campaign with a 56–19 (12–9, Pac–10), good for 4th in Pacific–10 Conference. After winning the national championship in 2002, the most outstanding player of the tournament was senior RHP Jocelyn Forest and Diane Ninemire and her coaching staff were named the Speedline/NFCA Division I Coaching Staff of the Year.

=== 2012 season ===
The 2012 season began for the Golden Bears with extremely high expectations with head coach Diane Ninemire going as far as comparing her 2012 squad to the 2002 national championship team. The Bears started the season as #3 in the NFCA poll and spent most of the season as the #1 team in the country in both the ESPN and NFCA polls. The Golden Bears compiled a record of 50–4 (21–3 in conference play), received the overall #1 seed in the 2012 NCAA Division I softball tournament, and thanks to upgrades at Levine-Fricke Field, California will be able to host tournament games for the first time since 1993.

=== 2025 season ===
The 2025 season was Cal's first in the ACC after leaving the Pac-12. They helped set an NCAA softball attendance record in their game against rival Stanford at Stanford Stadium. A crowd of 13,207 saw Cal defeat Stanford 10–8 in the "Big Swing".

== Coaching staff ==
Name	Position coached	Consecutive season at California in current position
Steve Singleton	Head coach	1st
Danielle Gibson Whorton	Assistant coach	1st
Chelsea Rex-Singleton	Assistant coach	1st
Camille Corona	Assistant coach	1st

== Season-by-season results ==
Record table
Season	Coach	Overall	Conference	Standing	Postseason
Debbie Gebhardt (NCIAC) (1972–1973)
1972	Debbie Gebhardt	2–4	—	—	—
1973	Debbie Gebhardt	2–4	—	4th (NCIAC)	—
Debbie Gebhardt:		4–8 (.333)	—		
Coni Staff (NCIAC) (1974–1975)
1974	Coni Staff	5–4	—	5th (NCIAC)	—
1975	Coni Staff	4–3	—	3rd (NCIAC)	—
Coni Staff:		9–7 (.563)	—		
Myrtle Baker (NCIAC/NorCal) (1976–1977)
1976	Myrtle Baker	9–6	—	3rd (NCIAC)	—
1977	Myrtle Baker	12–9	5–3	4th (NorCal)	—
Myrtle Baker:		21–15 (.583)	5–3 (.625)		
Bonnie Johnson (NorCal) (1978–1982)
1978	Bonnie Johnson	19–19–1	—	2nd (NorCal)	—
1979	Bonnie Johnson	37–9	—	1st (NorCal)	—
1980	Bonnie Johnson	46–11	—	1st (NorCal)	6–3 (AIAW WCWS, 9th Place)
1981	Bonnie Johnson	48–13	—	1st (NorCal)	4–4 (AIAW WCWS, T–5th Place)
1982	Bonnie Johnson	37–17–1	—	2nd (NorCal)	2–4 (AIAW WCWS, T–3rd Place)
Bonnie Johnson:		187–69–2 (.730)	—		
Donna Terry (NorPac/Pac-10) (1983–1987)
1983	Donna Terry	26–21	6–6	4th (NorPac)	—
1984	Donna Terry	27–19–1	8–4	3rd (NorPac)	—
1985	Donna Terry	35–25	6–4	4th (NorPac)	—
1986	Donna Terry	43–17	8–2	T–1st (NorPac)	4–3 (WCWS, T–3rd Place)
1987	Donna Terry	34–15	8–2	1st (Pac-10)	0–2 (NCAA Regional)
Donna Terry:		165–97–1 (.630)	36–18 (.667)		
Diane Ninemire (Pac-10/Pac-12) (1988–present)
1988	Diane Ninemire	39–24	7–11	5th (Pac-10)	1–2 (NCAA Regional)
1989	Diane Ninemire	38–26	10–10	4th (Pac-10)	0–2 (NCAA Regional)
1990	Diane Ninemire	41–28	9–9	3rd (Pac-10)	2–2 (NCAA Regional)
1991	Diane Ninemire	48–20	14–6	3rd (Pac-10)	0–2 (NCAA Regional)
1992	Diane Ninemire	47–16	8–8	3rd (Pac-10)	3–2 (WCWS, T–5th Place)
1993	Diane Ninemire	37–20	12–10	3rd (Pac-10)	2–2 (NCAA Regional)
1994	Diane Ninemire	40–21	10–12	5th (Pac-10)	1–2 (NCAA Regional)
1995	Diane Ninemire	41–21	20–8	3rd (Pac-10)	1–2 (NCAA Regional)
1996	Diane Ninemire	41–23	14–12	4th (Pac-10)	4–2 (WCWS, T–5th Place)
1997	Diane Ninemire	36–26	13–14	4th (Pac-10)	2–2 (NCAA Regional)
1998	Diane Ninemire	35–27	12–14	4th (Pac-10)	1–2 (NCAA Regional)
1999	Diane Ninemire	51–22	13–14	5th (Pac-10)	7–3 (WCWS, T–3rd Place)
2000	Diane Ninemire	49–25	6–15	T–7th (Pac-10)	4–3 (WCWS, T–7th Place)
2001	Diane Ninemire	54–18	6–14	7th (Pac-10)	5–3 (WCWS, T–5th Place)
2002	Diane Ninemire	56–19	12–9	4th (Pac-10)	8–0 (WCWS Champions)
2003	Diane Ninemire	49–20	10–11	3rd (Pac-10)	8–2 (WCWS, 2nd Place)
2004	Diane Ninemire	53–13	13–8	T–2nd (Pac-10)	7–2 (WCWS, 2nd Place)
2005	Diane Ninemire	52–15	13–8	T–1st (Pac-10)	6–4 (WCWS, T–7th Place)
2006	Diane Ninemire	49–14	12–9	3rd (Pac-10)	4–2 (NCAA Super Regional)
2007	Diane Ninemire	34–32	7–14	8th (Pac-10)	1–2 (NCAA Regional)
2008	Diane Ninemire	43–27	7–14	5th (Pac-10)	3–3 (NCAA Super Regional)
2009	Diane Ninemire	38–20	10–10	5th (Pac-10)	3–2 (NCAA Super Regional)
2010	Diane Ninemire	44–17	10–11	4th (Pac-10)	3–2 (NCAA Super Regional)
2011	Diane Ninemire	45–13	15–6	2nd (Pac-10)	6–3 (WCWS, T–5th Place)
2012	Diane Ninemire	58-7	21–3	1st (Pac-12)	8–3 (WCWS, T-3rd Place)
2013	Diane Ninemire	38–19	10–14	T–5th	2–2 (NCAA Regional)
2014	Diane Ninemire	23–29	4–18	9th	
2015	Diane Ninemire	39–18	10–14	7th	1–2 (NCAA Regional)
2016	Diane Ninemire	33–24–1	11–11–1	6th	2–2 (NCAA Regional)
2017	Diane Ninemire	32–24	6–17	8th	2–2 (NCAA Regional)
2018	Diane Ninemire	35–21	7–16	7th	1–2 (NCAA Regional)
2019	Diane Ninemire	28–27	5–18	8th	
2020	Diane Ninemire	10–9 (Note: Ninemire stepped down after the first 19 games of the season. Tammy Lohmann served as acting head coach for the remainder of the season.)	0–0		
Diane Ninemire:		1,355-687-1 (.663)	337–367–1 (.479)		
Tammy Lohmann (Pac-12 Conference) (2020–2020)
2020	Tammy Lohmann	13–11 (Note: Diane Ninemire stepped down after the first 19 games of the season. Lohmann served as acting head coach for the remainder of the season.)	0–0		Season canceled due to COVID-19
Tammy Lohmann:		13–11 (.542)	0–0 (–)		
Chelsea Spencer (Pac-12 Conference) (2021–2024)
2021	Chelsea Spencer	17–20	3–11	8th	
2022	Chelsea Spencer	28–27–1	8–16	T–8th	
2023	Chelsea Spencer	35–21–1	9–14–1	6th	2–2 (NCAA Regional)
2024	Chelsea Spencer	37–19	9–13	7th	1–2 (NCAA Regional)
Chelsea Spencer (Atlantic Coast Conference) (2025–2025)
2025	Chelsea Spencer	37–21	11–13	9th	2–2 (NCAA Regional)
Chelsea Spencer:		154–108–2 (.587)	40–67–1 (.375)		
Steve Singleton (Atlantic Coast Conference) (2026–present)
2026	Steve Singleton	0–0	0–0		
Steve Singleton:		0–0–0 (–)	0–0–0 (–)		
Total:		1,908–1,002–6 (.654)			
National Champions College World Series Participants Conference Champions

Source: 2012 Golden Bears Record Book

== Coaches ==
Head Coach	Years	Win–loss	Pct.
Debbie Gebhardt	1972–1973	4–3	.333
Coni Staff	1974–1975	9–7	.563
Myrtle Baker	1976–1977	21–15	.583
Bonnie Johnson	1978–1982	187–69–2	.729
Donna Terry	1983–1987	165–97–1	.629
Diane Ninemire	1988–2020	1,355–687–1	.663
Tammy Lohmann	2020	13–11	.542
Chelsea Spencer	2020–2025	154–108–2	.587
Steve Singleton	2026–present	0–0–0	–

- University of California Athletic Department

== Notable players ==
=== National awards ===
NFCA Catcher of the Year

- Haley Woods (2006)

=== Conference awards ===
Pac-12 Player of the Year

- Valerie Arioto (2012)

Pac-12 Pitcher of the Year

- Kristina Thorson (2006)
- Jolene Henderson (2011, 2012)

Pac-12 Coach of the Year

- Donna Terry (1987)
- Diane Ninemire (1991, 2012)

== See also ==
- List of NCAA Division I softball programs
