= List of UCLA Bruins softball seasons =

The following is a list of UCLA Bruins softball seasons. The University of California, Los Angeles is a member of the Pac-12 Conference of the NCAA Division I. The Bruins are fourteen time Women's College World Series champions, (Note: Includes the 1995 championship, which was later vacated by the NCAA.) with the first of those titles coming during the AIAW years, and the remaining 13 under NCAA organization. UCLA has also appeared in the final event 34 times - 3 under the AIAW and 31 under the NCAA. The team played its first season in 1975.

National champions	WCWS Appearance	NCAA Tournament appearance	Conference champions

Season	Head coach	Conference	Season results									Postseason result
Season	Head coach	Conference	Overall				Conference					Postseason result
Season	Head coach	Conference	Wins	Losses	Ties	%	Wins	Losses	Ties	%	Finish	Postseason result
1975	Sharron Backus	SCWIAC	14	6	0	.700	9	0	0	1.000	1st	—
1976	Sharron Backus	SCWIAC	13	4	0	.765	9	1	0	.900	1st	—
1977	Sharron Backus	Independent	17	10	0	.630	—	—	—	—	—	—
1978	Sharron Backus	Independent	31	13	0	.705	—	—	—	—	—	National Champions
1979	Sharron Backus	Independent	24	9	0	.727	—	—	—	—	—	WCWS Runner-up
1980	Sharron Backus	WCAA	24	13	0	.649	11	5	0	.688	2nd	—
1981	Sharron Backus	WCAA	38	10	0	.792	10	5	0	.667	2nd	WCWS Third Place
1982	Sharron Backus	WCAA	33	7	2	.810	15	4	1	.775	2nd	NCAA National Champions
1983	Sharron Backus	WCAA	40	7	0	.851	17	3	0	.850	1st	WCWS Third Place
1984	Sharron Backus	WCAA	45	6	1	.875	7	3	0	.700	1st	National Champions
1985	Sharron Backus	WCAA	41	9	0	.820	9	3	0	.750	2nd	National Champions
1986	Sharron Backus	WCAA	28	15	0	.651	10	2	0	.833	1st	—
1987	Sharron Backus	Pac-12	50	10	0	.833	7	3	0	.700	2nd	WCWS Runner-up
1988	Sharron Backus	Pac-12	53	8	0	.869	15	3	0	.833	1st	National Champions
1989	Sharron Backus & Sue Enquist	Pac-12	48	4	0	.923	18	2	0	.900	1st	National Champions
1990	Sharron Backus & Sue Enquist	Pac-12	62	7	0	.899	16	2	0	.889	1st	National Champions
1991	Sharron Backus & Sue Enquist	Pac-12	56	7	0	.889	16	4	0	.800	1st	WCWS Runner-up
1992	Sharron Backus & Sue Enquist	Pac-12	54	2	0	.964	14	2	0	.875	2nd	National Champions
1993	Sharron Backus & Sue Enquist	Pac-12	50	5	0	.909	25	1	0	.962	1st	WCWS Runner-up
1994	Sharron Backus & Sue Enquist	Pac-12	43	14	0	.754	16	6	0	.727	2nd	WCWS Fourth Place
1995	Sharron Backus & Sue Enquist	Pac-12	43	6	0	.878	23	4	0	.852	2nd	National Champions (Note: Later vacated by the NCAA.)
1996	Sharron Backus & Sue Enquist	Pac-12	47	11	0	.810	20	7	0	.741	3rd	WCWS Third Place
1997	Sue Enquist	Pac-12	49	14	0	.778	21	7	0	.750	2nd	WCWS Runner-up
1998	Sue Enquist	Pac-12	18	27	0	.400	8	18	0	.308	7th	—
1999	Sue Enquist	Pac-12	63	6	0	.913	22	6	0	.786	1st	National Champions
2000	Sue Enquist	Pac-12	46	12	1	.788	14	7	0	.667	3rd	WCWS Runner-up
2001	Sue Enquist	Pac-12	62	6	0	.912	16	5	0	.762	2nd	WCWS Runner-up
2002	Sue Enquist	Pac-12	55	9	0	.859	18	3	0	.857	1st	WCWS Fifth Place
2003	Sue Enquist	Pac-12	54	7	0	.885	17	4	0	.810	2nd	National Champions
2004	Sue Enquist	Pac-12	47	9	0	.839	12	8	0	.600	4th	National Champions
2005	Sue Enquist	Pac-12	40	20	0	.667	11	10	0	.524	5th	WCWS Runner-up
2006	Sue Enquist	Pac-12	50	9	0	.847	15	5	0	.750	1st	WCWS Fourth Place
2007	Kelly Inouye-Perez	Pac-12	37	18	0	.673	12	9	0	.571	T-3rd	NCAA Tournament
2008	Kelly Inouye-Perez	Pac-12	51	9	0	.850	17	4	0	.810	2nd	WCWS Fifth Place
2009	Kelly Inouye-Perez	Pac-12	45	11	0	.804	16	5	0	.762	1st	NCAA Tournament
2010	Kelly Inouye-Perez	Pac-12	50	11	0	.820	14	7	0	.667	2nd	National Champions
2011	Kelly Inouye-Perez	Pac-12	36	19	0	.655	9	12	0	.429	T-6th	NCAA Tournament
2012	Kelly Inouye-Perez	Pac-12	36	20	0	.643	12	12	0	.500	T-4th	NCAA Tournament
2013	Kelly Inouye-Perez	Pac-12	40	20	0	.667	10	14	0	.417	T-5th	NCAA Tournament
2014	Kelly Inouye-Perez	Pac-12	52	8	0	.867	19	5	0	.792	2nd	NCAA Tournament
2015	Kelly Inouye-Perez	Pac-12	51	12	0	.810	19	5	0	.792	2nd	WCWS Fifth Place
2016	Kelly Inouye-Perez	Pac-12	40	16	1	.711	16	5	1	.750	2nd	WCWS Seventh Place
2017	Kelly Inouye-Perez	Pac-12	48	15	0	.762	16	8	0	.667	T-3rd	WCWS Fifth Place
2018	Kelly Inouye-Perez	Pac-12	57	7	0	.891	20	4	0	.833	2nd	WCWS Third Place
2019	Kelly Inouye-Perez	Pac-12	56	6	0	.903	20	4	0	.833	T-1st	National Champions
2020	Kelly Inouye-Perez	Pac-12	25	1	0	.962	0	0	0	–	–	Covid-19 Season
2021	Kelly Inouye-Perez	Pac-12	47	7	0	.870	19	2	0	.905	1st	WCWS Fifth Place
2022	Kelly Inouye-Perez	Pac-12	51	10	0	.836	19	5	0	.792	2nd	WCWS Fifth Place
2023	Kelly Inouye-Perez	Pac-12	52	7	0	.881	21	3	0	.875	1st	NCAA Tournament
2024	Kelly Inouye-Perez	Pac-12	43	12	0	.782	17	4	0	.810	1st	WCWS Fifth Place
2025	Kelly Inouye-Perez	Big Ten	55	13	0	.809	17	5	0	.773	T-2nd	WCWS Fifth Place
2026	Kelly Inouye-Perez	Big Ten	53	10	0	.841	20	4	0	.833	T-2nd	WCWS Fifth Place
