= List of UCLA Bruins head softball coaches =

The UCLA Bruins softball program is a college softball team that represents the University of California, Los Angeles in the Big Ten Conference in the National Collegiate Athletic Association. The team has had 3 head coaches since it started playing organized softball in the 1975 season. The current coach is Kelly Inouye-Perez, who took over the head coaching position in 2007.

UCLA's first coach, Sharron Backus, led the team from 1975–1988 before becoming co-head coach with Sue Enquist. The two jointly led the team from 1989 through 1996, when Backus retired. Enquist then served as head coach by herself from 1997 to 2006.

== Key ==
General
#	Number of coaches (Note: A running total of the number of head coaches.)
GC	Games coached

Overall
OW	Wins
OL	Losses
OT	Ties
O%	Winning percentage

Conference (Note: UCLA was a member of the Southern California Women's Intercollegiate Athletic Conference in 1975 and 1976, and then an independent for three years. They then participated in the Western Collegiate Athletic Association in 1980. The Pac-12 Conference, then known as the Pac-10, began sponsoring women's sports in 1987. UCLA joined the Big Ten Conference before the 2025 season.)
CW	Wins
CL	Losses
CT	Ties
C%	Winning percentage

Postseason (Note: Postseason play involving the NCAA Division I Softball Championship or AIAW Women's College World Series.)
PA	Total Appearances (Note: Postseason appearances include seasons with NCAA Division I Softball Championship bids since the tournament began in 1982.)
PW	Total Wins
PL	Total Losses
WA	Women's College World Series appearances (Note: College World Series appearances include seasons with WCWS bids since the tournament began in 1969.)
WW	Women's College World Series wins
WL	Women's College World Series losses

Championships
CC	Conference regular season
NC	National championships (Note: Women's College World Series sponsored by either the AIAW or NCAA.)

== Coaches ==
List of head softball coaches showing season(s) coached, overall records, conference records, postseason records, championships and selected awards (Note: Statistics correct as of the end of the 2026 NCAA Division I softball season.)
#	Name	Term	GC	OW	OL	OT	O%	CW	CL	CT	C%	PA	WA	CCs	NCs
1	Sharron Backus	1975–1989	571	451	117	3	.792	119	32	1	.786	9	9	6	5
2	Backus/Enquist	1989–1996	459	403	56	0	.878	148	28	0	.841	8	8	4	4
3	Sue Enquist	1996–2006	604	484	119	1	.802	154	73	0	.678	10	10	3	3
4	Kelly Inouye-Perez	2007–present	1120	895	225	1	.799	296	112	1	.725	19	12	5	2
