= 2010 NCAA Division I softball season =

American college softball season

- Defending Champions: Washington

Tournament

Women's College World Series
- Champions: UCLA (12th (14th overall) title)
- Runners-up: Arizona (22nd WCWS Appearance)
- Winning Coach: Kelly Inouye-Perez (1st title)
- WCWS MOP: Megan Langenfeld (UCLA)

Seasons
- ← 2009 2011 →

The 2010 NCAA Division I softball season, play of college softball in the United States organized by the National Collegiate Athletic Association (NCAA) at the Division I level, began in February 2010. The season progressed through the regular season, many conference tournaments and championship series, and concluded with the 2010 NCAA Division I softball tournament and 2010 Women's College World Series. The Women's College World Series, consisting of the eight remaining teams in the NCAA Tournament and held in Oklahoma City at ASA Hall of Fame Stadium, ended on June 7, 2010.

== Conference standings ==
2010 Big 12 Conference softball standings
	Conf.				Overall
Team	W		L	PCT	W		L	PCT
No. 18 Texas ‍†‍‍^{y}	14	–	2	.875	43	–	15	.741
No. 11 Oklahoma ‍‍‡‍^{y}	13	–	3	.813	47	–	12	.797
No. 20 Texas A&M ‍‍‍^{y}	12	–	6	.667	44	–	16	.733
No. 23 Oklahoma State ‍‍‍^{y}	12	–	6	.667	44	–	16	.733
No. 8 Missouri ‍‍‍^{y}	11	–	7	.611	51	–	13	.797
Nebraska ‍‍‍^{y}	7	–	11	.389	30	–	29	.508
Texas Tech ‍‍‍^{y}	7	–	11	.389	38	–	18	.679
Baylor ‍‍‍	6	–	12	.333	28	–	25	.528
Iowa State ‍‍‍	4	–	14	.222	26	–	29	.473
Kansas ‍‍‍	2	–	16	.111	21	–	35	.375
† – Conference champion ‡ – Tournament champion y – Invited to the NCAA tournament Rankings from NFCA

2010 Big Ten Conference softball standings
	Conf.				Overall
Team	W		L	PCT	W		L	PCT
No. 10 Michigan ‍†‍‍^{y}	18	–	1	.947	49	–	8	.860
No. 25 Illinois ‍‍‍^{y}	16	–	2	.889	45	–	8	.849
No. 22 Ohio State ‍‍‍^{y}	16	–	2	.889	39	–	14	.736
Northwestern ‍‍‍	16	–	3	.842	50	–	15	.769
Iowa ‍‍‍	10	–	9	.526	25	–	23	.521
Purdue ‍‍‍	8	–	10	.444	27	–	27	.500
Penn State ‍‍‍	8	–	11	.421	29	–	22	.569
Wisconsin ‍‍‍	8	–	11	.421	20	–	31	.392
Michigan State ‍‍‍	5	–	15	.250	21	–	31	.404
Indiana ‍‍‍	4	–	14	.222	12	–	36	.250
Minnesota ‍‍‍	2	–	17	.105	16	–	37	.302
† – Conference champion y – Invited to the NCAA tournament As of May 28, 2010; Rankings from NFCA

2010 Pacific-10 Conference softball standings
	Conf.				Overall
Team	W		L	PCT	W		L	PCT
Washington ‍†‍‍^{y}	17	–	4	.810	50	–	9	.847
UCLA ‍‍‍^{y}	14	–	7	.667	50	–	11	.820
Arizona ‍‍‍^{y}	13	–	8	.619	52	–	14	.788
Arizona State ‍‍‍^{y}	10	–	11	.476	44	–	17	.721
California ‍‍‍^{y}	10	–	11	.476	44	–	19	.698
Stanford ‍‍‍^{y}	8	–	13	.381	37	–	19	.661
Oregon ‍‍‍^{y}	8	–	13	.381	36	–	21	.632
Oregon State ‍‍‍	4	–	17	.190	24	–	31	.436
† – Conference champion y – Invited to the NCAA tournament As of June 30, 2010; Rankings from Coaches' Poll

2010 Southland Conference softball standings
	Conf.				Overall
Team	W		L	PCT	W		L	PCT
Stephen F. Austin ** ‍‍‍	20	–	10	.667	29	–	20	.592
Texas State ‍‍‍	20	–	10	.667	27	–	26	.509
Texas–Arlington ‍‍‍	16	–	12	.571	29	–	25	.537
McNeese State ‡ ‍‍‍	17	–	13	.567	38	–	27	.585
Texas A&M–Corpus Christi ‍‍‍	16	–	14	.533	35	–	22	.614
Nicholls ‍‍‍	16	–	14	.533	25	–	22	.532
Texas–San Antonio ‍‍‍	15	–	15	.500	23	–	29	.442
Central Arkansas ‍‍‍	13	–	16	.448	25	–	31	.446
Sam Houston ‍‍‍	13	–	16	.448	21	–	28	.429
Northwestern State ‍‍‍	13	–	17	.433	27	–	27	.500
Southeastern Louisiana ‍‍‍	3	–	25	.107	11	–	37	.229
‡ – SLC Tournament Champion; **Southland Tournament #1 seed champion As of May 22, 2011; Rankings from USA Today/NFCA Coaches

2010 Sun Belt Conference softball standings
	Conf.				Overall
Team	W		L	PCT	W		L	PCT
No. 16 Louisiana–Lafayette ‍†‍‡‍^{y}	19	–	5	.792	45	–	18	.714
FIU ‍‍‍^{y}	17	–	7	.708	38	–	21	.644
North Texas ‍‍‍	12	–	9	.571	29	–	20	.592
Florida Atlantic ‍‍‍	12	–	10	.545	28	–	26	.519
South Alabama ‍‍‍	8	–	10	.444	21	–	23	.477
Troy ‍‍‍	10	–	13	.435	27	–	29	.482
Louisiana-Monroe ‍‍‍	9	–	14	.391	24	–	26	.480
Middle Tennessee ‍‍‍	7	–	17	.292	22	–	32	.407
Western Kentucky ‍‍‍	6	–	15	.286	27	–	25	.519
† – Conference champion ‡ – Tournament champion y – Invited to the NCAA tournament As of June 2010; Rankings from

== Women's College World Series ==
The 2010 NCAA Women's College World Series took place from June 3 to June 7, 2010 in Oklahoma City.

First round
16	Hawaii	3
9	Missouri	2
4	Florida	3
5	UCLA	16
9	Missouri	0
4	Florida	5
3	Washington	3
6	Georgia	6
10	Arizona	0
15	Tennessee	9
10	Arizona	4
3	Washington	3

Second round
16	Hawaii	2
5	UCLA	5
6	Georgia	3
4	Florida	2
6	Georgia	5
15	Tennessee	7
16	Hawaii	1
10	Arizona	5

Semifinals
5	UCLA	5	—
6	Georgia	2	—
15	Tennessee	0	2
10	Arizona	8	5

Finals
5	UCLA	6	15	—
10	Arizona	5	9	—

== Season leaders ==
Batting

- Batting average: .567 – Jen Yee, Georgia Tech Yellow Jackets
- RBIs: 90 – Angeline Quiocho, BYU Cougars
- Home runs: 30 – Kelly Majam, Hawaii Rainbow Wahine

Pitching

- Wins: 40-5 – Danielle Lawrie, Washington Huskies
- ERA: 0.94 (32 ER/237.0 IP) – Whitney Kiihnl, Lipscomb Bisons
- Strikeouts: 556 – Sara Plourde, UMass Minutewomen

== Records ==
NCAA Division I season SEASON slugging percentage: 1.270% – Jen Yee, Georgia Tech Yellow Jackets

NCAA Division I season intentional walks: 31 – Jen Yee, Georgia Tech Yellow Jackets

Sophomore class single game home runs: 4 – Rebecca Magett, Hampton Lady Pirates; April 2, 2010

Freshman class home runs: 30 – Kelly Majam, Hawaii Rainbow Wahine

== Awards ==
- USA Softball Collegiate Player of the Year:

Danielle Lawrie, Washington Huskies

- Honda Sports Award Softball:

Danielle Lawrie, Washington Huskies

YEAR	W	L	GP	GS	CG	SHO	SV	IP	H	R	ER	BB	SO	ERA	WHIP
2010	40	5	48	44	41	24	2	302.1	169	53	48	46	495	1.11	0.71

YEAR	G	AB	R	H	BA	RBI	HR	3B	2B	TB	SLG	BB	SO	SB	SBA
2010	59	169	33	53	.313	57	15	0	5	103	.609%	28	23	1	1

== All America Teams ==
The following players were members of the All-American Teams.

First Team

Position	Player	Class	School
P	Kenzie Fowler	FR.	Arizona Wildcats
P	Danielle Lawrie	SR.	Washington Huskies
P	Jen Mineau	SO.	Fordham Rams
C	Chelsea Bramlett	SR.	Mississippi State Bulldogs
1B	Meredith Hackett	SO.	Illinois Fighting Illini
2B	Jen Yee	SR.	Georgia Tech Yellowjackets
3B	Melissa Gonzalez	JR.	Hawaii Rainbow Wahine
SS	Katelyn Boyd	SO.	Arizona State Sun Devils
OF	Alissa Haber	SR.	Stanford Cardinal
OF	Brittany Lastrapes	JR.	Arizona Wildcats
OF	April Setterlund	JR.	Boston Terriers
UT	Megan Langenfeld	SR.	UCLA Bruins
UT	Nikia Williams	SO.	Washington Huskies
AT-L	Valerie Arioto	JR.	California Golden Bears
AT-L	GiOnna DiSalvatore	JR.	UCLA Bruins
AT-L	Jenn Salling	JR.	Washington Huskies
AT-L	Kristen Shortridge	SR.	LSU Tigers
AT-L	Danielle Spaulding	SR.	North Carolina Tar Heels

Second Team

Position	Player	Class	School
P	Blaire Luna	FR.	Texas Longhorns
P	Keilani Ricketts	FR.	Oklahoma Sooners
P	Jordan Taylor	JR.	Michigan Wolverines
C	Stacie Chambers	JR.	Arizona Wildcats
1B	Dorian Shaw	JR.	Michigan Wolverines
2B	Amber Flores	SR.	Oklahoma Sooners
3B	Maggie Viefhaus	SR.	Michigan Wolverines
SS	K'Lee Arredondo	SR.	Arizona Wildcats
OF	Kelly Majam	FR.	Hawaii Rainbow Wahine
OF	Taylor Schlopy	JR.	Georgia Bulldogs
OF	Francesca Enea	SR.	Florida Gators
UT	Charlotte Morgan	SR.	Alabama Crimson Tide
UT	Jessica Shults	FR.	Oklahoma Sooners
AT-L	Kayla Braud	FR.	Alabama Crimson Tide
AT-L	Alisa Goler	JR.	Georgia Bulldogs
AT-L	Meagan May	FR.	Texas A&M Aggies
AT-L	Nikki Nemitz	SR.	Michigan Wolverines
AT-L	Melissa Roth	SR.	Louisville Cardinals

Third Team

Position	Player	Class	School
P	Whitney Kiihnl	SO.	Lipscomb Bisons
P	Toni Paisley	JR.	East Carolina Pirates
P	Sara Plourde	SO.	UMass Minutewomen
C	Samantha Marder	SR.	Ohio State Buckeyes
1B	Renae Sinkler	SR.	Creighton Bluejays
2B	Kara Nelson	JR.	Illinois State Redbirds
3B	Abby Olson	JR.	Illinois State Redbirds
SS	Lauren Grill	SR.	Mississippi Rebels
OF	Raven Chavanne	FR.	Tennessee Lady Vols
OF	Lauren Lindsay	SR.	Tulsa Golden Hurricanes
OF	Rhea Taylor	JR.	Missouri Tigers
DP	Hope Rush	FR.	Georgia Tech Yellowjackets
UT	Miranda Dixon	SR.	Arkansas Razorbacks
AT-L	Samantha Beasley	JR.	San Diego State Aztecs
AT-L	Stephanie Brombacher	JR.	Florida Gators
AT-L	Kat Dotson	FR.	Tennessee Lady Vols
AT-L	Kelsi Dunne	JR.	Alabama Crimson Tide
AT-L	Katie Fleury	JR.	Notre Dame Fighting Irish
