= 1987 UCLA Bruins softball team =

American college softball season

1987 UCLA Bruins softball

NCAA Northwest Regional champion

Women's College World Series, runner-up
- Conference: Pacific-10 Conference
- Record: 50–10 (7–3 Pac-10)
- Head coach: Sharron Backus (13th season)
- Home stadium: Sunset Field

1987 Pacific-10 Conference softball standings
	Conf.				Overall
Team	W		L	PCT	W		L	PCT
California ‍†‍‍^{y}	8	–	2	.800	34	–	15	.694
UCLA ‍‍‍^{y}	7	–	3	.700	50	–	10	.833
Arizona ‍‍‍^{y}	6	–	4	.600	42	–	16	.724
Arizona State ‍‍‍^{y}	6	–	4	.600	41	–	15	.732
Oregon ‍‍‍	2	–	8	.200	23	–	30	.434
Oregon State ‍‍‍	1	–	9	.100	16	–	21	.432
† – Conference champion y – Invited to the NCAA tournament

The 1987 UCLA Bruins softball team represented the University of California, Los Angeles in the 1987 NCAA Division I softball season. The Bruins were coached by Sharron Backus, who led her thirteenth season. The Bruins played their home games at Sunset Field and finished with a record of 50–10. They competed in the Pacific-10 Conference, where they finished second with a 7–3 record.

The Bruins were invited to the 1987 NCAA Division I softball tournament, where they swept the Northwest Regional and then completed a run to the title game of the Women's College World Series where they fell to champion Texas A&M.

== Personnel ==
=== Roster ===
1987 UCLA Bruins roster
Pitchers: 4 – Samantha Ford – sophomore; 9 – Lisa Longaker – freshman; - Michelle Phillips – sophomore; Catchers: 18 – Shauna Wattenberg – senior; 21 – Stacy Sunny; 22 – Monica Tourville	Infielders: 24 – Lisa Hankerd – junior; - Gina Holmstrom – senior; - Janice Parks – sophomore	Outfielders: 10 – Michelle Montgomery; 17 – Karen Walker – sophomore; - Sara Arledge – senior; Unknown: - Cindy Bird; - Diana Forman; - Donna Forman; - Kathy Lorenz

=== Coaches ===
1987 UCLA Bruins softball coaching staff
- Sharron Backus - 13th season
- Sue Enquist - 8th season

== Schedule ==
Legend
	UCLA win
	UCLA loss
*	Non-Conference game

1987 UCLA Bruins softball game log
Regular season

February
Date	Opponent	Site/stadium	Score	Overall record	Pac-10 record
Feb 11	at Loyola Marymount*	Los Angeles, CA	W 10–0^{5}	1–0	
Feb 11	at Loyola Marymount*	Los Angeles, CA	W 12–0	2–0	
Feb 20	at US International*		W 8–0	3–0	
Feb 20	at US International*		W 7–1	4–0	
Feb 25	UC Santa Barbara*	Sunset Field • Los Angeles, CA	W 2–1	5–0	
Feb 25	UC Santa Barbara*	Sunset Field • Los Angeles, CA	W 2–1	6–0	
Feb 27	San Diego State*	Sunset Field • Los Angeles, CA	W 4–0	7–0	
Feb 27	San Diego State*	Sunset Field • Los Angeles, CA	W 3–0	8–0	

March
Date	Opponent	Site/stadium	Score	Overall record	Pac-10 record
Mar 4	Pacific*	Sunset Field • Los Angeles, CA	W 1–0	9–0	
Mar 4	Pacific*	Sunset Field • Los Angeles, CA	W 6–2	10–0	
Mar 6	vs Colorado State*	Rebel Softball Diamond • Paradise, NV	W 4–0	11–0	
Mar 6	vs Nevada*	Rebel Softball Diamond • Paradise, NV	W 5–2	12–0	
Mar 6	at UNLV*	Rebel Softball Diamond • Paradise, NV	W 9–0	13–0	
Mar 8	vs Oregon*	Rebel Softball Diamond • Paradise, NV	W 7–0	14–0	
Mar 23	Utah State*	Sunset Field • Los Angeles, CA	L 0–2	14–1	
Mar 23	Utah State*	Sunset Field • Los Angeles, CA	W 3–2	15–1	
Mar 25	Michigan*	Sunset Field • Los Angeles, CA	W 10–2	16–1	
Mar 25	Michigan*	Sunset Field • Los Angeles, CA	W 4–0	17–1	
Mar 27	vs Oklahoma State*	San Jose, CA (National Invitational softball tournament)	W 2–0	18–1	
Mar 27	vs New Mexico*	San Jose, CA (National Invitational softball tournament)	W 3–0	19–1	
Mar 27	vs Santa Clara*	San Jose, CA (National Invitational softball tournament)	W 8–1	20–1	
Mar 28	vs Utah*	San Jose, CA (National Invitational softball tournament)	W 6–0	21–1	
Mar 28	vs California*	San Jose, CA (National Invitational softball tournament)	W 3–1	22–1	
Mar 29	vs Nebraska*	San Jose, CA (National Invitational softball tournament)	L 1–3	22–2	
Mar 31	Long Beach State*	Sunset Field • Los Angeles, CA	W 4–0	23–2	
Mar 31	Long Beach State*	Sunset Field • Los Angeles, CA	W 4–0	24–2	

April
Date	Opponent	Site/stadium	Score	Overall record	Pac-10 record
Apr 3	Northwestern*	Sunset Field • Los Angeles, CA	L 0–2	24–3	
Apr 3	Northwestern*	Sunset Field • Los Angeles, CA	W 3–2^{8}	25–3	
Apr 5	Fresno State*	Sunset Field • Los Angeles, CA	W 5–0	26–3	
Apr 5	Fresno State*	Sunset Field • Los Angeles, CA	W 3–0	27–3	
Apr 10	at California	Hearst Field • Berkeley, CA	L 0–3	27–4	0–1
Apr 10	at California	Hearst Field • Berkeley, CA	L 0–1	27–5	0–2
Apr 12	Nevada*	Sunset Field • Los Angeles, CA	W 3–0	28–5	
Apr 12	Nevada*	Sunset Field • Los Angeles, CA	W 7–0	29–5	
Apr 15	at Cal Poly Pomona*	Pomona, CA	W 6–2^{10}	30–5	
Apr 15	at Cal Poly Pomona*	Pomona, CA	L 3–4^{10}	30–6	
Apr 18	US International*	Sunset Field • Los Angeles, CA	W 2–0	31–6	
Apr 18	US International*	Sunset Field • Los Angeles, CA	W 1–0^{8}	32–6	
Apr 23	at Cal State Fullerton*	Lions Field • Fullerton, CA	W 3–1	33–6	
Apr 23	at Cal State Fullerton*	Lions Field • Fullerton, CA	L 0–2	33–7	
Apr 26	at Oregon State	Corvallis, OR	W 3–1	34–7	1–2
Apr 26	at Oregon State	Corvallis, OR	W 4–0	35–7	2–2
Apr 27	at Oregon	Howe Field • Eugene, OR	W 6–3	36–7	3–2
Apr 27	at Oregon	Howe Field • Eugene, OR	W 2–0	37–7	4–2
Apr 30	Arizona	Sunset Field • Los Angeles, CA	W 1–0	38–7	5–2
Apr 30	Arizona	Sunset Field • Los Angeles, CA	L 1–2	38–8	5–3

May
Date	Opponent	Site/stadium	Score	Overall record	Pac-10 record
May 2	Arizona State	Sunset Field • Los Angeles, CA	W 3–0	39–8	6–3
May 2	Arizona State	Sunset Field • Los Angeles, CA	W 2–0	40–8	7–3
May 4	Cal Poly Pomona*	Sunset Field • Los Angeles, CA	W 6–0	41–8	
May 4	Cal Poly Pomona*	Sunset Field • Los Angeles, CA	W 2–1	42–8	
May 6	Loyola Marymount*	Sunset Field • Los Angeles, CA	W 8–1	43–8	
May 6	Loyola Marymount*	Sunset Field • Los Angeles, CA	W 10–0^{5}	44–8	

Postseason

NCAA Northwest Regional
Date	Opponent	Site/stadium	Score	Overall record	NCAAT record
May 15	Long Beach State	Sunset Field • Los Angeles, CA	W 1–0	45–8	1–0
May 16	Long Beach State	Sunset Field • Los Angeles, CA	W 2–0	46–8	2–0

NCAA Women's College World Series
Date	Opponent	Site/stadium	Score	Overall record	WCWS Record
May 20	Arizona	Seymour Smith Park • Omaha, NE	W 1–0^{9}	47–8	1–0
May 22	Nebraska	Seymour Smith Park • Omaha, NE	W 3–0	48–8	2–0
May 23	Texas A&M	Seymour Smith Park • Omaha, NE	W 1–0	49–8	3–0
May 23	Cal State Fullerton	Seymour Smith Park • Omaha, NE	W 1–0	50–8	4–0
May 24	Texas A&M	Seymour Smith Park • Omaha, NE	L 0–1	50–9	4–1
May 24	Texas A&M	Seymour Smith Park • Omaha, NE	L 1–4	50–10	4–2
