= 2010 UCLA Bruins softball team =

American college softball season

2010 UCLA Bruins softball

National Champion NCAA Los Angeles Super Regional champion NCAA Los Angeles Regional champion
- Conference: Pacific-10 Conference
- Record: 50–11 (14–7 Pac-10)
- Head coach: Kelly Inouye-Perez (4th season)
- Home stadium: Easton Stadium

2010 Pacific-10 Conference softball standings
| | Conf. | | | | Overall |
| Team | W | | L | PCT | W | | L | PCT |
|---|---|---|---|---|---|---|---|---|
| Washington ‍†‍‍^{y} | 17 | – | 4 | .810 | 50 | – | 9 | .847 |
| UCLA ‍‍‍^{y} | 14 | – | 7 | .667 | 50 | – | 11 | .820 |
| Arizona ‍‍‍^{y} | 13 | – | 8 | .619 | 52 | – | 14 | .788 |
| Arizona State ‍‍‍^{y} | 10 | – | 11 | .476 | 44 | – | 17 | .721 |
| California ‍‍‍^{y} | 10 | – | 11 | .476 | 44 | – | 19 | .698 |
| Stanford ‍‍‍^{y} | 8 | – | 13 | .381 | 37 | – | 19 | .661 |
| Oregon ‍‍‍^{y} | 8 | – | 13 | .381 | 36 | – | 21 | .632 |
| Oregon State ‍‍‍ | 4 | – | 17 | .190 | 24 | – | 31 | .436 |
† – Conference champion y – Invited to the NCAA tournament As of June 30, 2010; Rankings from Coaches' Poll

The 2010 UCLA Bruins softball team represented the University of California, Los Angeles in the 2010 college softball season. The Bruins were coached by Kelly Inouye-Perez, in her fourth season. The Bruins played their home games at Easton Stadium and finished with a record of 50–11. They competed in the Pacific-10 Conference, where they finished second with a 14–7 record.

The Bruins were invited to the 2010 NCAA Division I softball tournament, where they swept the Los Angeles Regional and Super Regional and then completed a run through the Women's College World Series to claim their eleventh Women's College World Series Championship. The Bruins had earlier claimed an AIAW title in 1978 and NCAA titles in 1982, 1984, 1988, 1989, 1990, 1992, 1995, 1999, 2003, and 2004. The 1995 championship was vacated by the NCAA.

== Personnel ==
=== Roster ===
2010 UCLA Bruins roster
| Pitchers: 5 Donna Kerr – junior; 11 Whitney Baker – junior; 13 Destiny Rodino – freshman; 24 Aleah Macon – sophomore; 31 Megan Langenfeld – senior; Catchers: 9 Kaila Shull – senior; 17 Charlotte Dolan – freshman; 20 Brooke Finley – sophomore; 44 Dani Yudin – sophomore | Infielders: 14 Julie Burney – senior; 18 Monica Harrison – junior; Utility: 3 GiOnna DiSalvatore – junior; 4 Marti Reed – sophomore; 7 Samantha Camuso – sophomore; 21 Grace Murray – junior; 23 Amy Crawford – junior | Outfielders: 8 Andrea Harrison – sophomore; 19 B.B. Bates – freshman; 29 Katie Schroeder – junior; 42 Devon Lindvall – freshman |

=== Coaches ===
2010 UCLA Bruins softball coaching staff
- Kelly Inouye-Perez – Head coach – 4th season
- Lisa Fernandez – Assistant coach – 14th season
- Gina Vecchione – Assistant coach – 11th season
- Natasha Watley – Volunteer assistant coach – 5th season

== Schedule ==
Legend
| | UCLA win |
| | UCLA loss |
| * | Non-Conference game |

2010 UCLA Bruins softball game log
Regular season

February
| Date | Opponent | Site/stadium | Score | Overall record | Pac-10 record |
|---|---|---|---|---|---|
| Feb 13 | vs Florida Atlantic* | Clermont, FL | W 11–0^{5} | 1–0 | |
| Feb 13 | vs Tennessee Volunteers* | Clermont, FL | W 11–1^{6} | 2–0 | |
| Feb 14 | vs Michigan* | Clermont, FL | L 2–4^{13} | 2–1 | |
| Feb 14 | vs Georgia* | Clermont, FL | W 3–2 | 3–1 | |
| Feb 17 | at UC Santa Barbara* | Santa Barbara, CA | W 14–0^{5} | 4–1 | |
| Feb 17 | at UC Santa Barbara* | Santa Barbara, CA | W 11–1^{6} | 5–1 | |
| Feb 19 | Cal State Northridge* | Easton Stadium • Los Angeles, CA | W 9–0^{5} | 6–1 | |
| Feb 19 | Cal Poly* | Easton Stadium • Los Angeles, CA | W 8–0^{5} | 7–1 | |
| Feb 20 | UC Davis* | Easton Stadium • Los Angeles, CA | W 8–0^{6} | 8–1 | |
| Feb 20 | Cal State Northridge* | Easton Stadium • Los Angeles, CA | W 7–2 | 9–1 | |
| Feb 21 | Portland State* | Easton Stadium • Los Angeles, CA | W 11–0^{6} | 10–1 | |
| Feb 24 | Cal State Fullerton* | Easton Stadium • Los Angeles, CA | W 9–6 | 11–1 | |
| Feb 26 | vs Colorado State* | Big League Dreams Sports Park • Cathedral City, CA | W 4–3 | 12–1 | |
| Feb 26 | vs Texas* | Big League Dreams Sports Park • Cathedral City, CA | W 9–1 | 13–1 | |
| Feb 27 | vs Baylor* | Big League Dreams Sports Park • Cathedral City, CA | L 5–7 | 13–2 | |
| Feb 27 | vs Northwestern* | Big League Dreams Sports Park • Cathedral City, CA | W 10–5^{8} | 14–2 | |
| Feb 28 | vs Ohio State* | Big League Dreams Sports Park • Cathedral City, CA | L 0–7 | 14–3 | |

March
| Date | Opponent | Site/stadium | Score | Overall record | Pac-10 record |
|---|---|---|---|---|---|
| Mar 3 | at UC Riverside* | Amy S. Harrison Field • Riverside, CA | L 2–3 | 14–4 | |
| Mar 5 | vs Fresno State* | San Diego, CA | W 5–4 | 15–4 | |
| Mar 6 | vs UTEP* | San Diego, CA | W 6–0 | 16–4 | |
| Mar 10 | North Carolina* | Easton Stadium • Los Angeles, CA | W 1–0 | 17–4 | |
| Mar 21 | at Cal State Bakersfield* | CSUB Softball Complex • Bakersfield, CA | W 8–0^{6} | 18–4 | |
| Mar 21 | at Cal State Bakersfield* | CSUB Softball Complex • Bakersfield, CA | W 7–0 | 19–4 | |
| Mar 23 | at Cal Poly* | Bob Janssen Field • San Luis Obispo, CA | W 5–3 | 20–4 | |
| Mar 23 | at Cal Poly* | Bob Janssen Field • San Luis Obispo, CA | W 4–1 | 21–4 | |
| Mar 26 | Long Beach State* | Easton Stadium • Los Angeles, CA | W 11–3^{6} | 22–4 | |
| Mar 27 | UNLV* | Easton Stadium • Los Angeles, CA | W 8–0^{5} | 23–4 | |
| Mar 27 | UNLV* | Easton Stadium • Los Angeles, CA | W 11–3^{5} | 24–4 | |
| Mar 28 | at Loyola Marymount* | Smith Field • Los Angeles, CA | W 8–2 | 25–4 | |
| Mar 28 | at Loyola Marymount* | Smith Field • Los Angeles, CA | W 5–0^{5} | 26–4 | |

April
| Date | Opponent | Site/stadium | Score | Overall record | Pac-10 record |
|---|---|---|---|---|---|
| Apr 1 | at Washington | Husky Softball Stadium • Seattle, WA | W 1–0 | 27–4 | 1–0 |
| Apr 2 | at Washington | Husky Softball Stadium • Seattle, WA | L 1–3 | 27–5 | 1–1 |
| Apr 3 | at Washington | Husky Softball Stadium • Seattle, WA | L 2–7 | 27–6 | 1–2 |
| Apr 9 | Arizona State | Easton Stadium • Los Angeles, CA | L 5–8 | 27–7 | 1–3 |
| Apr 10 | Arizona State | Easton Stadium • Los Angeles, CA | L 2–4 | 27–8 | 1–4 |
| Apr 11 | Arizona State | Easton Stadium • Los Angeles, CA | L 1–2 | 27–9 | 1–5 |
| Apr 16 | at Oregon State | Oregon State Softball Complex • Corvallis, OR | W 12–0^{5} | 28–9 | 2–5 |
| Apr 17 | at Oregon State | Oregon State Softball Complex • Corvallis, OR | W 4–2 | 29–9 | 3–5 |
| Apr 18 | at Oregon State | Oregon State Softball Complex • Corvallis, OR | W 10–6 | 30–9 | 4–5 |
| Apr 23 | at Stanford | Boyd & Jill –Smith Family Stadium • Stanford, CA | W 10–0^{5} | 31–9 | 5–5 |
| Apr 24 | at Stanford | Boyd & Jill Smith Family Stadium • Stanford, CA | W 7–3 | 32–9 | 6–5 |
| Apr 25 | at Stanford | Boyd & Jill Smith Family Stadium • Stanford, CA | W 10–1^{6} | 33–9 | 7–5 |
| Apr 30 | Oregon | Easton Stadium • Los Angeles, CA | W 11–4 | 34–9 | 8–5 |

May
| Date | Opponent | Site/stadium | Score | Overall record | Pac-10 record |
|---|---|---|---|---|---|
| May 1 | Oregon | Easton Stadium • Los Angeles, CA | W 10–2^{5} | 35–9 | 9–5 |
| May 2 | Oregon | Easton Stadium • Los Angeles, CA | W 10–2^{6} | 36–9 | 10–5 |
| May 7 | California | Easton Stadium • Los Angeles, CA | W 4–2 | 37–9 | 11–5 |
| May 8 | California | Easton Stadium • Los Angeles, CA | W 3–1 | 38–9 | 12–5 |
| May 9 | California | Easton Stadium • Los Angeles, CA | L 2–4 | 38–10 | 12–6 |
| May 13 | at Arizona | Rita Hillenbrand Memorial Stadium • Tucson, AZ | W 6–5^{8} | 39–10 | 13–6 |
| May 14 | at Arizona | Rita Hillenbrand Memorial Stadium • Tucson, AZ | L 3–5 | 39–11 | 13–7 |
| May 15 | at Arizona | Rita Hillenbrand Memorial Stadium • Tucson, AZ | W 6–4 | 40–11 | 14–7 |

Postseason

NCAA Los Angeles Regional
| Date | Opponent | Site/stadium | Score | Overall record | NCAAT record |
|---|---|---|---|---|---|
| May 21 | Saint Mary's | Easton Stadium • Los Angeles, CA | W 11–4 | 41–11 | 1–0 |
| May 22 | San Diego State | Easton Stadium • Los Angeles, CA | W 4–3 | 42–11 | 2–0 |
| May 23 | Fresno State | Easton Stadium • Los Angeles, CA | W 7–2 | 43–11 | 3–0 |

NCAA Los Angeles Super Regional
| Date | Opponent | Site/stadium | Score | Overall record | SR Record |
|---|---|---|---|---|---|
| May 29 | Louisiana–Lafayette | Easton Stadium • Los Angeles, CA | W 10–2^{5} | 44–11 | 1–0 |
| May 30 | Louisiana–Lafayette | Easton Stadium • Los Angeles, CA | W 10–1^{5} | 45–11 | 2–0 |

NCAA Women's College World Series
| Date | Opponent | Rank | Site/stadium | Score | Overall record | WCWS Record |
|---|---|---|---|---|---|---|
| June 3 | (4) Florida | (5) | ASA Hall of Fame Stadium • Oklahoma City, OK | W 5–0 | 46–11 | 1–0 |
| June 4 | (16) Hawaii | (5) | ASA Hall of Fame Stadium • Oklahoma City, OK | W 5–2 | 47–11 | 2–0 |
| June 6 | (6) Georgia | (5) | ASA Hall of Fame Stadium • Oklahoma City, OK | W 5–2 | 48–11 | 3–0 |
| June 7 | (10) Arizona | (5) | ASA Hall of Fame Stadium • Oklahoma City, OK | W 6–5 | 49–11 | 4–0 |
| June 7 | (10) Arizona | (5) | ASA Hall of Fame Stadium • Oklahoma City, OK | W 15–9 | 50–11 | 5–0 |
