= 1987 NCAA Division I softball season =

American college softball season

- Defending Champions: Cal State Fullerton

Tournament

Women's College World Series
- Champions: Texas A&M (2nd NCAA (3rd overall) WCWS title)
- Runners-up: UCLA (5th WCWS Appearance)
- Winning Coach: Bob Brock (2nd title)

Seasons
- ← 1986 1988 →

The 1987 NCAA Division I softball season, play of college softball in the United States organized by the National Collegiate Athletic Association (NCAA) at the Division I level, began in February 1987. The season progressed through the regular season, many conference tournaments and championship series, and concluded with the 1987 NCAA Division I softball tournament and 1987 Women's College World Series. The Women's College World Series, consisting of the eight remaining teams in the NCAA Tournament and held in Omaha, Nebraska at Seymour Smith Park, ended on May 24, 1987.

== Conference standings ==
1987 Big Ten Conference softball standings
	Conf.						Overall
Team	W		L		T	PCT	W		L		T	PCT
Northwestern ‍†‍‍^{y}	18	–	6	–	0	.750	25	–	23	–	0	.521
Michigan ‍‍‍	17	–	7	–	0	.708	43	–	13	–	0	.768
Indiana ‍‍‍	15	–	9	–	0	.625	37	–	23	–	0	.617
Iowa ‍‍‍	12	–	12	–	0	.500	30	–	26	–	1	.535
Ohio State ‍‍‍	10	–	14	–	0	.417	22	–	25	–	0	.468
Minnesota ‍‍‍	8	–	16	–	0	.333	21	–	36	–	0	.368
Michigan State ‍‍‍	4	–	20	–	0	.167	13	–	34	–	0	.277
† – Conference champion y – Invited to the NCAA tournament Rankings from Coaches' Poll

1987 Pacific-10 Conference softball standings
	Conf.				Overall
Team	W		L	PCT	W		L	PCT
California ‍†‍‍^{y}	8	–	2	.800	34	–	15	.694
UCLA ‍‍‍^{y}	7	–	3	.700	50	–	10	.833
Arizona ‍‍‍^{y}	6	–	4	.600	42	–	16	.724
Arizona State ‍‍‍^{y}	6	–	4	.600	41	–	15	.732
Oregon ‍‍‍	2	–	8	.200	23	–	30	.434
Oregon State ‍‍‍	1	–	9	.100	16	–	21	.432
† – Conference champion y – Invited to the NCAA tournament As of May 31, 1987; Rankings from Coaches' Poll

1987 Southland Conference softball standings
	Conf.				Overall
Team	W		L	PCT	W		L	PCT
Southwestern Louisiana ‍†‍‡‍	10	–	2	.833	31	–	18	.633
Texas–Arlington ‍‍‍	9	–	3	.750	36	–	27	.571
McNeese State ‍‍‍	8	–	4	.667	23	–	14	.622
Northeast Louisiana ‍‍‍	8	–	4	.667	19	–	26	.422
Lamar ‍‍‍	3	–	9	.250	9	–	26	.257
North Texas ‍‍‍	3	–	9	.250	15	–	32	.319
Arkansas State ‍‍‍	1	–	11	.083	3	–	23	.115
† – Conference champion ‡ – Tournament champion y – Invited to the NCAA tournament As of May 20, 1987; Rankings from Coaches' Poll

== Women's College World Series ==
The 1987 NCAA Women's College World Series took place from May 20 to May 24, 1987 in Omaha, Nebraska.

Upper round 1
UCLA	1^{9}
Arizona State	0
Nebraska	1
Fresno State	0
Cal State Fullerton	3
Florida State	0
Texas A&M	3
Central Michigan	0

Upper round 2
UCLA	3
Nebraska	0
Cal State Fullerton	1
Texas A&M	2^{13}
Lower round 1
Arizona State	0
Fresno State	3
Florida State	0
Central Michigan	1

Upper final
UCLA	1
Texas A&M	0
Lower round 2
Cal State Fullerton	2
Fresno State	1
Nebraska	2
Central Michigan	1

Semifinals
UCLA	2
Cal State Fullerton	1
Texas A&M	4
Nebraska	0

Final
UCLA	0	1
Texas A&M	1	4

== Season leaders ==
Batting

- Batting average: .503 – Jill Justin, Northern Illinois Huskies
- RBIs: 45 – Jeanne Weinsheim, San Diego Toreros
- Home runs: 10 – Tiffany Daniels, Florida State Seminoles

Pitching

- Wins: 36-6 – Shawn Andaya, Texas A&M Aggies
- ERA: 0.30 (8 ER/185.1 IP) – Kristen Peterson, Adelphi Panthers
- Strikeouts: 326 – Shawn Andaya, Texas A&M Aggies

== Awards ==
- Honda Sports Award Softball:

Connie Clark, Cal State Fullerton Titans

YEAR	W	L	GP	GS	CG	SHO	SV	IP	H	R	ER	BB	SO	ERA	WHIP
1987	33	5	47	36	32	21	4	283.0	133	29	19	70	261	0.47	0.71

== All America Teams ==
The following players were members of the All-American Teams.

First Team

Position	Player	Class	School
P	Lisa Longaker	JR.	UCLA Bruins
P	Connie Clark	SR.	Cal State Fullerton Titans
P	Shawn Andaya	SR.	Texas A&M Aggies
C	Karen Sanchelli	JR.	South Carolina Gamecocks
1B	Gena Strang	JR.	Fresno State Bulldogs
2B	Julie Smith	FR.	Texas A&M Aggies
3B	Janice Parks	SO.	UCLA Bruins
SS	Liz Mizeria	JR.	Texas A&M Aggies
OF	Jill Justin	SO.	Northern Illinois Huskies
OF	Sheila Connelly	SR.	Kansas Jayhawks
OF	Chenita Rogers	SR.	Cal State Fullerton Titans
UT	Kristie Skoglund	SR.	Utah State Aggies

Second Team

Position	Player	Class	School
P	Lori Sippel	JR.	Nebraska Cornhuskers
P	Lisa Ishikawa	SR.	Northwestern Wildcats
P	Lori Romeiro-Gardner	SR.	Fresno State Bulldogs
C	Alicia Seegert	SR.	Michigan Wolverines
1B	Jodi Rathburn	SR.	Arizona State Sun Devils
2B	Lori Richins	SR.	Nebraska Cornhuskers
3B	Lisa Wunar	SO.	USF Bulls
SS	Tiffany Daniels	SO.	FSU Seminoles
OF	Sandra Arledge	SR.	UCLA Bruins
OF	Pipi Hollingsworth	SR.	Utah Utes
OF	Alison Stowell	JR.	Cal Poly Pomona Broncos
UT	Vicki Morrow	SR.	Michigan Wolverines
