= 2010 Louisiana–Lafayette Ragin' Cajuns softball team =

American college softball season

2010 Louisiana–Lafayette Ragin' Cajuns softball

Los Angeles Super Regionals appearance Baton Rouge Regionals champions

Sun Belt Conference tournament champions Sun Belt Conference regular-season champions
- Conference: Sun Belt Conference

Ranking
- Coaches: No. 16
- Record: 45–18 (19–5 SBC)
- Head coach: Michael Lotief (10th season); Stefni Lotief (11th season)
- Assistant coach: Chris Malveaux
- Home stadium: Lamson Park

2010 Sun Belt Conference softball standings
	Conf.				Overall
Team	W		L	PCT	W		L	PCT
No. 16 Louisiana–Lafayette ‍†‍‡‍^{y}	19	–	5	.792	45	–	18	.714
FIU ‍‍‍^{y}	17	–	7	.708	38	–	21	.644
North Texas ‍‍‍	12	–	9	.571	29	–	20	.592
Florida Atlantic ‍‍‍	12	–	10	.545	28	–	26	.519
South Alabama ‍‍‍	8	–	10	.444	21	–	23	.477
Troy ‍‍‍	10	–	13	.435	27	–	29	.482
Louisiana-Monroe ‍‍‍	9	–	14	.391	24	–	26	.480
Middle Tennessee ‍‍‍	7	–	17	.292	22	–	32	.407
Western Kentucky ‍‍‍	6	–	15	.286	27	–	25	.519
† – Conference champion ‡ – Tournament champion y – Invited to the NCAA tournament As of June 2010; Rankings from

The 2010 Louisiana–Lafayette Ragin' Cajuns softball team represented the University of Louisiana at Lafayette in the 2010 NCAA Division I softball season. The Ragin' Cajuns played their home games at Lamson Park and were led by tenth and eleventh year husband and wife head coaching duo Michael and Stefni Lotief, respectively.

== Roster ==
2010 Louisiana–Lafayette Ragin' Cajuns roster
Pitchers: 00 Ashley Brignac – Junior; 10 Brittany Cuevas – Senior; 21 Donna Bourgeois – Junior; 28 Paige Cavallin – Redshirt Freshman; Utility Players: 3 Ashley Ray – Sophomore; 8 Megan Waterman – Redshirt Freshman; 12 Christi Orgeron – Sophomore; 17 Callie Philen – Redshirt Freshman; Catchers: 6 Lana Bowers – Senior; 24 Sarah Draheim – Redshirt Freshman	Infielders: 4 Kelly Cormier – Senior; 7 Britni Soria – Redshirt Freshman; 9 Taryn Broussard – Sophomore; 15 Nerissa Myers – Freshman; 16 Melissa Verde – Senior; 19 Courtney Trahan – Senior; 22 Jennifer Martin – Redshirt Freshman; 25 Gabriele Bridges – Junior; 27 Jessica Dupont – Senior; 29 Megan Granger – Sophomore; 31 Paige Cormier – Sophomore; Outfielders: 5 Jensen Tydelski – Freshman; 8 Megan Waterman - Freshman; 13 Erikka Murphy – Sophomore; 14 Vallie Gaspard – Senior; 20 Katie Smith – Junior; 23 Brianna Cherry – Freshman

=== Coaching staff ===
2010 Louisiana–Lafayette Ragin' Cajuns coaching staff
- Michael Lotief – Co-Head Coach – 10th year
- Stefni Lotief – Co-Head Coach – 11th year
- Chris Malveaux - Assistant coach - 2nd year

== Schedule and results ==
Legend
	Louisiana-Lafayette win
	Louisiana-Lafayette loss
	Postponement
**Bold**	Louisiana-Lafayette team member

2010 Louisiana–Lafayette Ragin' Cajuns Softball Game Log
Regular season (38–16)

February (10–5)
Date	Opponent	Ranking	Site/stadium	Score	TV	Overall record	SBC record
Louisiana Classics
Feb. 12	vs. Bryant	No. 16	Lamson Park • Lafayette, LA	**W** 16–0		1–0	
Feb. 13	vs. Bradley	No. 16	Lamson Park • Lafayette, LA	**W** 8–0		2–0	
Feb. 13	vs. Syracuse	No. 16	Lamson Park • Lafayette, LA	**W** 9–0		3–0	
Feb. 14	vs. Bradley	No. 16	Lamson Park • Lafayette, LA	**W** 9–0		4–0	
Feb. 14	vs. Syracuse	No. 16	Lamson Park • Lafayette, LA	**W** 10–4		5–0	
Houston Marriott Classic
Feb. 19	vs. Iowa State	No. 16	Cougar Softball Stadium • Houston, TX	**W** 6–5		6–0	
Feb. 19	vs. Houston	No. 16	Cougar Softball Stadium • Houston, TX	**L** 1–2		6–1	
Feb. 20	vs. Texas	No. 16	Cougar Softball Stadium • Houston, TX	**L** 1–7		6–2	
Feb. 20	vs. UTSA	No. 16	Cougar Softball Stadium • Houston, TX	**W** 3–1		7–2	
Feb. 21	vs. Purdue	No. 16	Cougar Softball Stadium • Houston, TX	**W** 7–6		8–2	
NFCA Leadoff Classic
Feb. 26	vs. Radford	No. 18	South Commons Softball Complex • Columbus, GA	**W** 8–0		9–2	
Feb. 26	vs. No. 4 Michigan	No. 18	South Commons Softball Complex • Columbus, GA	**L** 0–6		9–3	
Feb. 27	vs. No. 6 Missouri	No. 18	South Commons Softball Complex • Columbus, GA	**L** 6–11		9–4	
Feb. 27	vs. No. 11 Georgia Tech	No. 18	South Commons Softball Complex • Columbus, GA	**L** 1–7		9–5	
Feb. 28	vs. UMass	No. 18	South Commons Softball Complex • Columbus, GA	**W** 14–0		10–5	

March (11–6)
Date	Opponent	Ranking	Site/stadium	Score	TV	Overall record	SBC record
Razorback Invitational
Mar. 5	vs. Drake	No. 19	Bogle Park • Fayetteville, AR	**L** 1–2		10–6	
Mar. 5	vs. Arkansas	No. 19	Bogle Park • Fayetteville, AR	**W** 5–2		11–6	
Mar. 6	vs. Eastern Illinois	No. 19	Bogle Park • Fayetteville, AR	**W** 11–0		12–6	
Mar. 6	vs. Southern Miss	No. 19	Bogle Park • Fayetteville, AR	**W** 7–3		13–6	
Mar. 7	vs. Iowa State	No. 19	Bogle Park • Fayetteville, AR	**W** 4–1		14–6	
Mar. 11	McNeese State	No. 22	Lamson Park • Lafayette, LA	**W** 9–1		15–6	
Mar. 11	McNeese State	No. 22	Lamson Park • Lafayette, LA	**L** 1–3		15–7	
Judi Garman Classic
Mar. 18	vs. Virginia	No. 23	Anderson Family Field • Fullerton, CA	**L** 4–10		15–8	
Mar. 18	vs. Fresno State	No. 23	Anderson Family Field • Fullerton, CA	**W** 7–5		16–8	
Mar. 19	vs. Washington	No. 23	Anderson Family Field • Fullerton, CA	**L** 0–8		16–9	
Mar. 20	vs. Purdue	No. 23	Anderson Family Field • Fullerton, CA	**L** 7–14		16–10	
Mar. 21	vs. Cal State Fullerton	No. 23	Anderson Family Field • Fullerton, CA	**L** 6–9		16–11	
Mar. 27	at Western Kentucky		WKU Softball Complex • Bowling Green, KY	**W** 7–4		17–11	1–0
Mar. 27	at Western Kentucky		WKU Softball Complex • Bowling Green, KY	**W** 8–1		18–11	2–0
Mar. 28	at Western Kentucky		WKU Softball Complex • Bowling Green, KY	**W** 6–2		19–11	3–0
Mar. 30	Houston		Lamson Park • Lafayette, LA	**W** 6–0		20–11	
Mar. 30	Houston		Lamson Park • Lafayette, LA	**W** 4–0		21–11	

April (12–4)
Date	Opponent	Ranking	Site/stadium	Score	TV	Overall record	SBC record
Apr. 6	at Middle Tennessee		Blue Raider Softball Field • Murfreesboro, TN	**L** 1–4		21–12	3–1
Apr. 6	at Middle Tennessee		Blue Raider Softball Field • Murfreesboro, TN	**W** 2–1		22–12	4–1
Apr. 7	at Middle Tennessee		Blue Raider Softball Field • Murfreesboro, TN	**W** 10–4		23–12	5–1
Apr. 10	at FIU		FIU Softball Stadium • Miami, FL	**L** 2–6		23–13	5–2
Apr. 10	at FIU		FIU Softball Stadium • Miami, FL	**L** 3–4		23–14	5–3
Apr. 11	at FIU		FIU Softball Stadium • Miami, FL	**W** 9–5		24–14	6–3
Apr. 14	at McNeese State		Joe Miller Field at Cowgirl Diamond • Lake Charles, LA	**W** 11–1		25–14	
Apr. 17	South Alabama		Lamson Park • Lafayette, LA	**W** 9–0		26–14	7–3
Apr. 17	South Alabama		Lamson Park • Lafayette, LA	**W** 4–3		27–14	8–3
Apr. 18	South Alabama		Lamson Park • Lafayette, LA	**W** 2–1		28–14	9–3
Apr. 20	Florida Atlantic		Lamson Park • Lafayette, LA	**W** 6–4		29–14	10–3
Apr. 20	Florida Atlantic		Lamson Park • Lafayette, LA	**W** 4–2		30–14	11–3
Apr. 21	Florida Atlantic		Lamson Park • Lafayette, LA	**W** 2–1		31–14	12–3
Apr. 24	at Troy	No. 17	Troy Softball Complex • Troy, AL	**W** 6–3		32–14	13–3
Apr. 25	at Troy		Troy Softball Complex • Troy, AL	**W** 5–0		33–14	14–3
Apr. 25	at Troy		Troy Softball Complex • Troy, AL	**L** 4–5		33–15	14–4
Apr. 27	Grambling State		Lamson Park • Lafayette, LA	Game canceled			
Apr. 27	Grambling State		Lamson Park • Lafayette, LA	Game canceled			

May (4–1)
Date	Opponent	Ranking	Site/stadium	Score	TV	Overall record	SBC record
May 1	North Texas		Lamson Park • Lafayette, LA	**W** 2–0		34–15	15–4
May 1	North Texas		Lamson Park • Lafayette, LA	**W** 2–1		35–15	16–4
May 2	North Texas		Lamson Park • Lafayette, LA	**W** 9–0		36–15	17–4
May 8	Louisiana–Monroe		Lamson Park • Lafayette, LA	**W** 9–1		37–15	18–4
May 8	Louisiana–Monroe		Lamson Park • Lafayette, LA	**W** 11–0		38–15	19–4
May 9	Louisiana–Monroe		Lamson Park • Lafayette, LA	**L** 1–2		38–16	19–5

Post-Season (7–2)

SBC tournament (4–0)
Date	Opponent	Ranking	Site/stadium	Score	TV	Overall record	SBC record
May 12	vs. Middle Tennessee (first round)	No. 17	Jaguar Field • Mobile, AL	**W** 3–1		39–16	
May 13	vs. Florida Atlantic (quarterfinals)	No. 17	Jaguar Field • Mobile, AL	**W** 1–0		40–16	
May 14	vs. Louisiana–Monroe (semifinals)	No. 17	Jaguar Field • Mobile, AL	**W** 6–1		41–16	
May 15	vs. Troy (championship)	No. 17	Jaguar Field • Mobile, AL	**W** 8–0		42–16	

NCAA Division I Softball Championship (3–2)
Date	Opponent	Ranking	Site/stadium	Score	TV	Overall record	SBC record
Baton Rouge Regionals
May 21	vs. No. 18 Texas A&M	No. 17	Tiger Park • Baton Rouge, LA	**W** 5–0		43–16	
May 22	vs. No. 16 LSU	No. 17	Tiger Park • Baton Rouge, LA	**W** 1–0		44–16	
May 23	vs. No. 18 Texas A&M	No. 17	Tiger Park • Baton Rouge, LA	**W** 6–1		45–16	
Los Angeles Super Regionals
May 29	vs. No. 5 UCLA	No. 17	Easton Stadium • Los Angeles, CA	**L** 2–10		45–17	
May 30	vs. No. 5 UCLA	No. 17	Easton Stadium • Los Angeles, CA	**L** 1–10		45–18	

Schedule source:

== Baton Rouge Regional ==
Baton Rouge Regional Teams
(1) LSU Lady Tigers	(2) Louisiana–Lafayette Ragin' Cajuns	(3) Texas A&M Aggies	(4) McNeese State Cowgirls

First Round
12	LSU	6
McNeese State	0
Texas A&M	0
Louisiana–Lafayette	5
Lower round 1
McNeese State	0
Texas A&M	2

Semi-finals
12	LSU	0
Louisiana–Lafayette	1
Lower final
12	LSU	0
Texas A&M	1

Finals
Louisiana–Lafayette	6	–
Texas A&M	1	–

== Los Angeles Super Regional ==
Los Angeles Super Regional Teams
(1) UCLA Bruins	(2) Louisiana–Lafayette Ragin' Cajuns

Game 1
Rank	Team	Score
	Louisiana–Lafayette	2
5	UCLA	10

Game 2
Rank	Team	Score
	Louisiana–Lafayette	1
5	UCLA	10
