= 2010 Arizona Wildcats softball team =

American college softball season

2010 Arizona Wildcats softball

NCAA Tucson Regional champion NCAA Tucson Super Regional champion

Women's College World Series, runner-up
- Conference: Pacific-10 Conference
- Record: 52–14 (12–8 Pac-10)
- Head coach: Mike Candrea (23rd season)

2010 Pacific-10 Conference softball standings
	Conf.				Overall
Team	W		L	PCT	W		L	PCT
Washington ‍†‍‍^{y}	17	–	4	.810	50	–	9	.847
UCLA ‍‍‍^{y}	14	–	7	.667	50	–	11	.820
Arizona ‍‍‍^{y}	13	–	8	.619	52	–	14	.788
Arizona State ‍‍‍^{y}	10	–	11	.476	44	–	17	.721
California ‍‍‍^{y}	10	–	11	.476	44	–	19	.698
Stanford ‍‍‍^{y}	8	–	13	.381	37	–	19	.661
Oregon ‍‍‍^{y}	8	–	13	.381	36	–	21	.632
Oregon State ‍‍‍	4	–	17	.190	24	–	31	.436
† – Conference champion y – Invited to the NCAA tournament As of June 30, 2010; Rankings from Coaches' Poll

The 2010 Arizona Wildcats softball team represented the University of Arizona in the 2010 NCAA Division I softball season. The Wildcats were coached by Mike Candrea, who led his twenty-third season. The Wildcats finished with a record of 52–14. They competed in the Pacific-10 Conference, where they finished third with a 12–8 record.

The Wildcats were invited to the 2010 NCAA Division I softball tournament, where they swept the Regional and then completed a run to the title game of the Women's College World Series where they fell to champion UCLA.

== Personnel ==
=== Roster ===
2010 Arizona Wildcats roster
Pitchers: 3 – Sarah Akamine – senior; 19 – Kenzie Fowler – freshman; 20 – Ashley Ralston-Alvarez – senior; Catchers: 12 – Shannon Tinsley – freshman; 21 – Stacie Chambers – junior; 90 – Lini Koria – sophomore	Infielders: 2 – Baillie Kirker – freshman; 5 – Kristen Arriola – sophomore; 7 – K’Lee Arredondo – senior; 9 – Matte Haack – freshman; 17 – Victoria Kemp – junior; 42 – Alicia Banks – sophomore	Outfielders: 00 – Nicole Bryan – junior; 8 – Becca Tikey – freshman; 15 – Karissa Buchanan – sophomore; 22 – Lauren Schutzler – junior; 35 – Brittany Lastrapes – junior; Utility: 4 – Brigette Del Ponte – freshman

=== Coaches ===
2010 Arizona Wildcats softball coaching staff
- Mike Candrea - Head coach - 25th season
- Larry Ray - Assistant Coach - 19th season
- Teresa Wilson - Assistant Coach - 2nd season

== Schedule ==
Legend
	Arizona win
	Arizona loss
*	Non-Conference game

2010 Arizona Wildcats softball game log
Regular season

February
Date	Opponent	Rank	Site/stadium	Score	Overall record	Pac-10 record
Feb 12	vs Western Michigan*	Alberta B. Farrington Softball Stadium • Tempe, AZ	W 13–0^{5}	1–0		
Feb 12	vs Purdue*	Alberta B. Farrington Softball Stadium • Tempe, AZ	W 10–0^{5}	2–0		
Feb 13	vs No. 15 Northwestern*	Alberta B. Farrington Softball Stadium • Tempe, AZ	W 4–3	3–0		
Feb 13	vs North Dakota State*	Alberta B. Farrington Softball Stadium • Tempe, AZ	W 6–0	4–0		
Feb 14	vs Nevada*	Alberta B. Farrington Softball Stadium • Tempe, AZ	W 10–5	5–0		
Feb 14	at Cal State Fullerton*	Alberta B. Farrington Softball Stadium • Tempe, AZ	W 8–1	6–0		
Feb 21	No. 6 Missouri*	Rita Hillenbrand Memorial Stadium • Tucson, AZ	W 5–0	7–0		
Feb 21	No. 6 Missouri*	Rita Hillenbrand Memorial Stadium • Tucson, AZ	L 5–10	7–1		
Feb 26	vs BYU*	Palm Springs, CA	W 8–0^{5}	8–1		
Feb 26	vs No. 19 Fresno State*	Palm Springs, CA	W 11–0^{5}	9–1		
Feb 27	vs Hawaii*	Palm Springs, CA	W 8–3	10–1		
Feb 28	vs Baylor*	Palm Springs, CA	W 3–2	11–1		
Feb 28	vs Cal Poly*	Palm Springs, CA	W 7–3	12–1		

March
Date	Opponent	Rank	Site/stadium	Score	Overall record	Pac-10 record
Mar 3	New Mexico State*	Rita Hillenbrand Memorial Stadium • Tucson, AZ	W 8–0^{5}	13–1		
Mar 3	New Mexico State*	Rita Hillenbrand Memorial Stadium • Tucson, AZ	W 9–0^{5}	14–1		
Mar 4	Northern Iowa*	Rita Hillenbrand Memorial Stadium • Tucson, AZ	W 4–1	15–1		
Mar 7	St. John's*	Rita Hillenbrand Memorial Stadium • Tucson, AZ	W 13–5^{5}	16–1		
Mar 11	St. John's*	Rita Hillenbrand Memorial Stadium • Tucson, AZ	W 13–0^{5}	17–1		
Mar 12	Northern Colorado*	Rita Hillenbrand Memorial Stadium • Tucson, AZ	W 4–1	18–1		
Mar 12	UIC*	Rita Hillenbrand Memorial Stadium • Tucson, AZ	W 8–0^{5}	19–1		
Mar 13	St. John's*	Rita Hillenbrand Memorial Stadium • Tucson, AZ	W 16–1^{5}	20–1		
Mar 13	Creighton*	Rita Hillenbrand Memorial Stadium • Tucson, AZ	W 6–0	21–1		
Mar 14	Minnesota*	Rita Hillenbrand Memorial Stadium • Tucson, AZ	W 12–0^{5}	22–1		
Mar 18	vs No. 24 Louisville*	Anderson Family Field • Fullerton, CA	W 11–3	23–1		
Mar 18	vs No. 4 Michigan*	Anderson Family Field • Fullerton, CA	L 0–1^{8}	23–2		
Mar 19	vs No. 11 Oklahoma*	Anderson Family Field • Fullerton, CA	W 4–3	24–2		
Mar 20	vs New Mexico*	Anderson Family Field • Fullerton, CA	W 9–3	25–2		
Mar 21	vs Virginia*	Anderson Family Field • Fullerton, CA	L 1–2	25–3		
Mar 26	at New Mexico*	Lobo Softball Field • Albuquerque, NM	W 8–0^{5}	26–3		
Mar 27	at New Mexico*	Lobo Softball Field • Albuquerque, NM	W 10–2^{6}	27–3		
Mar 28	at New Mexico*	Lobo Softball Field • Albuquerque, NM	W 14–0^{5}	28–3		

April
Date	Opponent	Rank	Site/stadium	Score	Overall record	Pac-10 record
Apr 1	at No. 7 Arizona State	Alberta B. Farrington Softball Stadium • Tempe, AZ	W 12–6	29–3	1–0	
Apr 2	at No. 7 Arizona State	Alberta B. Farrington Softball Stadium • Tempe, AZ	L 1–11^{11}	29–4	1–1	
Apr 3	at No. 7 Arizona State	Alberta B. Farrington Softball Stadium • Tempe, AZ	W 14–2^{5}	30–4	2–1	
Apr 7	UTEP*	Rita Hillenbrand Memorial Stadium • Tucson, AZ	W 8–0^{5}	31–4		
Apr 7	UTEP*	Rita Hillenbrand Memorial Stadium • Tucson, AZ	W 10–0^{5}	32–4		
Apr 9	at No. 1 Washington	Husky Softball Stadium • Seattle, WA	L 1–2	32–5	2–2	
Apr 10	at No. 1 Washington	Husky Softball Stadium • Seattle, WA	L 0–7	32–6	2–3	
Apr 11	at No. 1 Washington	Husky Softball Stadium • Seattle, WA	L 3–9	32–7	2–4	
Apr 16	No. 8 Stanford	Rita Hillenbrand Memorial Stadium • Tucson, AZ	W 3–2	33–7	3–4	
Apr 17	No. 8 Stanford	Rita Hillenbrand Memorial Stadium • Tucson, AZ	W 10–2^{6}	34–7	4–4	
Apr 18	No. 8 Stanford	Rita Hillenbrand Memorial Stadium • Tucson, AZ	W 5–4	35–7	5–4	
Apr 23	Oregon State	Rita Hillenbrand Memorial Stadium • Tucson, AZ	W 20–1^{5}	36–7	6–4	
Apr 24	Oregon State	Rita Hillenbrand Memorial Stadium • Tucson, AZ	W 8–0^{5}	37–7	7–4	
Apr 25	Oregon State	Rita Hillenbrand Memorial Stadium • Tucson, AZ	W 9–1^{5}	38–7	8–4	
Apr 30	at No. 13 California	Levine-Fricke Field • Berkeley, CA	W 8–0^{5}	39–7	9–4	

May
Date	Opponent	Rank	Site/stadium	Score	Overall record	Pac-10 record
May 1	at No. 13 California	Levine-Fricke Field • Berkeley, CA	W 4–2^{9}	40–7	10–4	
May 2	at No. 13 California	Levine-Fricke Field • Berkeley, CA	L 0–8^{6}	40–8	10–5	
May 7	at No. 22 Oregon	Howe Field • Eugene, OR	W 8–	41–8	11–5	
May 8	at No. 22 Oregon	Howe Field • Eugene, OR	L 1–2^{11}	41–9	11–6	
May 9	at No. 22 Oregon	Howe Field • Eugene, OR	W 11–0^{5}	42–9	12–6	
May 13	No. 5 UCLA	Rita Hillenbrand Memorial Stadium • Tucson, AZ	L 5–6^{8}	42–10	12–7	
May 14	No. 5 UCLA	Rita Hillenbrand Memorial Stadium • Tucson, AZ	W 5–3	43–10	13–7	
May 15	No. 5 UCLA	Rita Hillenbrand Memorial Stadium • Tucson, AZ	L 4–6	43–11	13–8	

Postseason

NCAA Tucson Regional
Date	Opponent	Rank	Site/stadium	Score	Overall record	NCAAT record
May 21	Cornell		Rita Hillenbrand Memorial Stadium • Tucson, AZ	W 9–0	44–11	1–0
May 22	Hofstra		Rita Hillenbrand Memorial Stadium • Tucson, AZ	W 6–0	45–11	2–0
May 23	Hofstra		Rita Hillenbrand Memorial Stadium • Tucson, AZ	W 10–6	46–11	3–0

NCAA Tucson Super Regional
Date	Opponent	Rank	Site/stadium	Score	Overall record	NCAAT record
May 28	BYU	(10)	Rita Hillenbrand Memorial Stadium • Tucson, AZ	W 2–1	47–11	1–0
May 29	BYU	(10)	Rita Hillenbrand Memorial Stadium • Tucson, AZ	W 10–2	48–11	2–0

NCAA Women's College World Series
Date	Opponent	Rank	Site/stadium	Score	Overall record	WCWS Record
June 3	(15) Tennessee	(10)	ASA Hall of Fame Stadium • Oklahoma City, OK	W 1–0	48–12	0–1
June 5	(3) Washington	(10)	ASA Hall of Fame Stadium • Oklahoma City, OK	W 1–0^{8}	49–12	1–1
June 5	(16) Hawaii	(10)	ASA Hall of Fame Stadium • Oklahoma City, OK	W 5–1	50–12	2–1
June 6	Tennessee	(10)	ASA Hall of Fame Stadium • Oklahoma City, OK	W 8–0^{5}	51–12	3–1
June 6	Tennessee	(10)	ASA Hall of Fame Stadium • Oklahoma City, OK	W 5–2	52–12	4–1
June 7	(5) UCLA	(10)	ASA Hall of Fame Stadium • Oklahoma City, OK	L 5–6	52–13	4–2
June 8	(5) UCLA	(10)	ASA Hall of Fame Stadium • Oklahoma City, OK	L 9–15	52–14	4–3
