= Pac-12 Conference Softball Coach of the Year =

Pac-12 Conference Coach of the Year
- Awarded for: the most outstanding college softball coach in the Pac-12 Conference
- Country: United States

History
- First award: 1987
- Most recent: Kelly Inouye-Perez, UCLA

The Pac-12 Conference Softball Coach of the Year is a college softball award given to the Pac-12 Conference's most outstanding coach. The award has been given annually since 1987. The conference was known as the Pacific-10 before becoming the Pac-12 in 2011. Mike Candrea has won the award a record eleven times.

== Winners ==
Season	Player	School	Reference
1987	Mike Candrea; Donna Terry	Arizona; California	
1988	Mike Candrea (2)	Arizona	
1989	Teresa Wilson	Oregon	
1990	Sharron Backus	UCLA	
1991	Diane Ninemire	California	
1992	Sharron Backus (2)	UCLA	
1993	Sharron Backus (3)	UCLA	
1994	Mike Candrea (3)	Arizona	
1995	Sharron Backus (4); Sue Enquist	UCLA	
1996	Teresa Wilson (2)	Washington	
1997	Mike Candrea (4)	Arizona	
1998	Mike Candrea (5)	Arizona	
1999	Sue Enquist (2); Kirk Walker	UCLA; Oregon State	
2000	Mike Candrea (6); Teresa Wilson (3)	Arizona; Washington	
2001	Mike Candrea (7); John Rittman	Arizona; Stanford	
2002	Mike Candrea (8)	Arizona	
2003	Mike Candrea (9)	Arizona	
2004	John Rittman (2)	Stanford	
2005	Kirk Walker	Oregon State	
2006	Sue Enquist (3)	UCLA	
2007	Mike Candrea (10)	Arizona	
2008	Clint Myers	Arizona State	
2009	Kelly Inouye-Perez	UCLA	
2010	Heather Tarr	Washington	
2011	Clint Myers (2)	Arizona State	
2012	Diane Ninemire (2)	California	
2013	Mike White	Oregon	
2014	Mike White (2)	Oregon	
2015	Amy Hogue	Utah	
2016	Mike White (3)	Oregon	
2017	Mike Candrea (11)	Arizona	
2018	Trisha Ford	Arizona State	
2019	Jessica Allister	Stanford	
2021	Kelly Inouye-Perez (2)	UCLA	
2022	Trisha Ford (2)	Arizona State	
2023	Kelly Inouye-Perez (3)	UCLA	
2024	Kelly Inouye-Perez (4)	UCLA	

== Winners by school ==
School	Winners	Years
Arizona	11	1987, 1988, 1994, 1997, 1998, 2000, 2001, 2002, 2003, 2007, 2017
UCLA	9	1990, 1992, 1993, 1995, 1999, 2006, 2021, 2023, 2024
Arizona State	5	2006, 2008, 2011, 2018, 2022
Oregon	4	1989, 2013, 2014, 2016
California	3	1987, 1991, 2012
Stanford	3	2001, 2004, 2019
Washington	3	1996, 2000, 2010
Oregon State	2	1999, 2005
Utah	1	2015
