= 1987 Texas A&M Aggies softball team =

Softball varsity team

1987 Texas A&M Aggies softball

National Champion NCAA Central Regional champion
- Conference: Independent
- Record: 56–8
- Head coach: Bob Brock (6th season)

The 1987 Texas A&M Aggies softball team represented Texas A&M University in the 1987 NCAA Division I softball season. The Aggies were coached by Bob Brock, who led his sixth season at Texas A&M. The Aggies finished with a record of 56–8.

The Aggies were invited to the 1987 NCAA Division I softball tournament, where they swept the Central Regional and then completed a run through the Women's College World Series to claim the NCAA Women's College World Series Championship for the second time. Texas A&M had won the 1983 Women's College World Series and the 1982 AIAW Women's College World Series, and did not participate in the 1982 NCAA Women's College World Series.

== Roster ==
1987 Texas A&M Aggies roster
Pitchers: - Shawn Andaya – senior; - Julie Carpenter – sophomore; Catchers: - Erika Eriksson – sophomore	Infielders: - Liz Mizera – junior; - Julie Smith – freshman; - Judy Trussell – senior	Outfielders: - Erin Newkirk – sophomore; - Tory Parks – sophomore; Utility: - Renee Blaha – freshman

== Schedule ==
Legend
	Texas A&M win
	Texas A&M loss
*	Non-Conference game

1987 Texas A&M Aggies softball game log
Regular season

March
Date	Opponent	Site/stadium	Score	Overall record
Mar 1	vs Texas–Arlington	Yvette Girouard Field at Lamson Park • Lafayette, LA	W 2–0	1–0
Mar 1	at Southwestern Louisiana	Yvette Girouard Field at Lamson Park • Lafayette, LA	W 4–0	2–0
Mar 6	Baylor	College Station, TX	W 9–2	3–0
Mar 6	Oklahoma State	College Station, TX	W 3–0	4–0
Mar 6	South Carolina	College Station, TX	W 2–1	5–0
Mar 7	Sam Houston State	College Station, TX	W 1–0	6–0
Mar 7	Louisiana Tech	College Station, TX	L 0–4	6–1
Mar 7	Cal State Fullerton	College Station, TX	L 0–5	6–2
Mar 11	vs Creighton	Norman, OK	W 1–0	7–2
Mar 11	vs Creighton	Norman, OK	W 6–2	8–2
Mar 12	vs Northern Illinois	Norman, OK	W 2–0	9–2
Mar 12	vs Baylor	Norman, OK	W 15–1	10–2
Mar 12	vs Oklahoma State	Norman, OK	W 3–0	11–2
Mar 13	vs Central Michigan	Norman, OK	W 4–2	12–2
Mar 13	vs Northeast Louisiana	Norman, OK	W 8–0	13–2
Mar 14	vs New Mexico	Norman, OK	W 5–0	14–2
Mar 14	vs Central Michigan	Norman, OK	W 6–1	15–2
Mar 14	vs Illinois State	Norman, OK	W 2–0	16–2
Mar 17	vs Kansas	Lake Jackson, TX	W 5–0	17–2
Mar 17	vs Kansas	Lake Jackson, TX	W 10–3^{11}	18–2
Mar 18	vs Indiana	Houston, TX	W 2–1	19–2
Mar 19	vs Colorado State	Houston, TX	W 6–4	20–2
Mar 19	vs Baylor	Houston, TX	W 6–0	21–2
Mar 19	vs Kansas	Houston, TX	W 7–1	22–2
Mar 20	vs Texas–Arlington	Houston, TX	W 4–0	23–2
Mar 20	vs Oklahoma City	Houston, TX	W 7–0	24–2
Mar 21	vs Nebraska	Houston, TX	W 1–0^{9}	25–2
Mar 21	vs Arizona State	Houston, TX	W 9–1	26–2
Mar 23	Nebraska	College Station, TX	L 2–3	26–3
Mar 23	Nebraska	College Station, TX	W 2–1^{9}	27–3
Mar 26	vs Cal Poly Pomona	Lions Field • Fullerton, CA	W 3–0	28–3
Mar 27	vs San Diego State	Lions Field • Fullerton, CA	W 7–2	29–3
Mar 27	vs Michigan	Lions Field • Fullerton, CA	W 5–1	30–3
Mar 28	vs Arizona	Lions Field • Fullerton, CA	L 0–1^{10}	30–4
Mar 31	Texas–Arlington	College Station, TX	W 2–0	31–4
Mar 31	Texas–Arlington	College Station, TX	W 1–0^{8}	32–4

April/May
Date	Opponent	Site/stadium	Score	Overall record
Apr 2	Utah State	College Station, TX	L 0–1	32–5
Apr 4	Utah State	College Station, TX	W 2–0	33–5
Apr 4	Utah State	College Station, TX	L 1–2	33–6
Apr 7	Southwest Texas State	College Station, TX	W 2–0	34–6
Apr 7	Southwest Texas State	College Station, TX	W 5–0	35–6
Apr 16	at Sam Houston State	Huntsville, TX	W 6–0	36–6
Apr 16	at Sam Houston State	Huntsville, TX	W 7–0	37–6
Apr 18	at Northeast Louisiana	Geo-Surfaces Field at the ULM Softball Complex • Monroe, LA	W 3–0	38–6
Apr 18	at Northeast Louisiana	Geo-Surfaces Field at the ULM Softball Complex • Monroe, LA	W 4–0	39–6
Apr 19	at Louisiana Tech	Ruston, LA	W 7–1	40–6
Apr 19	at Louisiana Tech	Ruston, LA	L 4–6	40–7
Apr 24	vs Arizona State	Albuquerque, NM	W 5–4	41–7
Apr 24	vs Arizona	Albuquerque, NM	W 9–3	42–7
Apr 25	at New Mexico	Albuquerque, NM	W 3–0	43–7
Apr 25	at New Mexico	Albuquerque, NM	W 9–4	44–7
Apr 26	vs South Florida	Albuquerque, NM	W 7–2	45–7
Apr 26	vs New Mexico State	Albuquerque, NM	W 1–0	46–7
Apr 29	at Baylor	Waco, TX	W 8–0	47–7
Apr 29	at Baylor	Waco, TX	W 4–1	48–7
May 5	Sam Houston State	College Station, TX	W 2–0	49–7

Post-Season

NCAA Central Regional
Date	Opponent	Site/stadium	Score	Overall record	Reg. Record
May 15	Louisiana Tech	College Station, TX	W 4–0	50–7	1–0
May 16	Louisiana Tech	College Station, TX	W 2–1	51–7	2–0

NCAA Women's College World Series
Date	Opponent	Site/stadium	Score	Overall record	WCWS record
May 21	Central Michigan	Seymour Smith Park • Omaha, NE	W 3–0	52–7	1–0
May 22	Cal State Fullerton	Seymour Smith Park • Omaha, NE	W 2–1^{13}	53–7	2–0
May 23	UCLA	Seymour Smith Park • Omaha, NE	L 0–1	53–8	2–1
May 23	Nebraska	Seymour Smith Park • Omaha, NE	W 4–0	54–8	3–1
May 24	UCLA	Seymour Smith Park • Omaha, NE	W 1–0	55–8	4–1
May 24	UCLA	Seymour Smith Park • Omaha, NE	W 4–1	56–8	5–1
