= 1978 Women's College World Series =

The 1978 AIAW Women's College World Series (WCWS) was held in Omaha, Nebraska on May 25–28. Sixteen fastpitch softball teams emerged from regional tournaments to meet in the national collegiate softball championship.

UCLA won its first national championship in its first tournament appearance by holding all five of its opponents scoreless through the tournament and beating Northern Colorado, 3-0, in the final game. Lady Bruins' center fielder Sue Enquist, who later coached the Bruins' softball team to ten more titles as head coach and co-head coach, was named the Most Outstanding Player of the tournament.

== Teams ==
The double-elimination tournament included these teams:

| Team | Appearance |
|---|---|
| Arizona State | 6th |
| Cal Poly Pomona | 1st |
| Illinois State | 7th |
| Massachusetts | 2nd |
| Minnesota | 2nd |
| Nebraska–Omaha | 9th |
| Northern Colorado | 10th |
| Oregon State | 2nd |
| Portland State | 1st |
| South Carolina | 5th |
| Southern Illinois | 4th |
| Southwest Missouri State | 8th |
| Stephen F. Austin | 1st |
| Texas Woman's | 2nd |
| UCLA | 1st |
| Utah State | 1st |

== Bracket ==
Upper round 1 | Upper round 2 | Upper round 3 | Upper final | Final
Southwest Missouri State | 11
Massachusetts | 2
Southwest Missouri State | 0
UCLA | 1
Texas Woman's | 0
UCLA | 4
UCLA | 7
Utah State | 0
Arizona State | 10
Portland State | 0
Arizona State | 0
Utah State | 2
South Carolina | 0
Utah State | 11
UCLA | 3^{(11)}
Minnesota | 0
Southern Illinois | 2
Stephen F. Austin | 1
Southern Illinois | 2
Minnesota | 6
Cal Poly–Pomona | 1
Minnesota | 2
Minnesota | 4
Northern Colorado | 1
Nebraska–Omaha | 2
Illinois State | 1
Nebraska–Omaha | 2 | UCLA | 3
Northern Colorado | 3 | Northern Colorado | 0
Oregon State | 0
Northern Colorado | 3
Lower round 1 | Lower round 2 | Lower round 3 | Lower round 4 | Lower round 5 | Lower final
Nebraska–Omaha | 0
Utah State | 0
Massachusetts | 0 | Texas Woman's | 4
Texas Woman's | 3 | Texas Woman's | 3
Texas Woman's | 1
Southern Illinois | 1 | Minnesota | 1
Southern Illinois | 4
Texas Woman's | 3 | Northern Colorado | 3
Portland State | 10 | Portland State | 1
Northern Colorado | 7
South Carolina | 7
Arizona State | 0
Northern Colorado | 4
Stephen F. Austin | 1 | Cal Poly–Pomona | 1
Cal Poly–Pomona | 1 | Cal Poly–Pomona | 3
Cal Poly–Pomona | 2
Southwest Missouri State | 0
Southwest Missouri State | 1
Illinois State | 2 | Oregon State | 0
Oregon State | 4

== Ranking ==
| Place | School | WCWS Record |
|---|---|---|
| 1st | UCLA | 5–0 |
| 2nd | Northern Colorado | 5–2 |
| 3rd | Minnesota | 3–2 |
| 4th | Texas Woman's | 4–2 |
| 5th | Cal Poly–Pomona | 3–2 |
| 5th | Utah State | 2–2 |
| 7th | Southern Illinois | 2–2 |
| 7th | Southwest Missouri State | 2–2 |
| 9th | Arizona State | 1–2 |
| 9th | Oregon State | 1–2 |
| 9th | Portland State | 1–2 |
| 9th | Nebraska–Omaha | 1–2 |
| 13th | Illinois State | 0–2 |
| 13th | Massachusetts | 0–2 |
| 13th | Stephen F. Austin | 0–2 |
| 13th | South Carolina | 0–2 |
