= 1987 NCAA Division I softball tournament =

- Teams: 16
- Finals site: Seymour Smith Park; Omaha, NE
- Champions: Texas A&M (2nd NCAA (3rd overall) title)
- Runner-up: UCLA (5th WCWS Appearance)
- Winning coach: Bob Brock (2nd NCAA (3rd overall) title)

The 1987 NCAA Division I softball tournament was held in May as the conclusion of the 1987 NCAA Division I softball season. Sixteen Division I college softball teams competed in the NCAA tournament's first round, which consisted of eight regionals with two teams each. The winner of each region, a total of eight teams, advanced to the 1987 Women's College World Series in Omaha, Nebraska. The event, held from May 20 to 24, was the sixth NCAA-sponsored championship in the sport of college softball at the Division I level. Texas A&M won the championship by defeating UCLA 4–1 in the final game.

== Regionals ==
At-Large Regional
–	Arizona State	5	5	—
–	Arizona	3	0	—

- Arizona State qualifies for WCWS, 2–0

Northwest Regional
–	UCLA	1	2	—
–	Long Beach State	0	0	—

- UCLA qualifies for WCWS, 2–0

Northeast Regional
–	Fresno State	3	5	—
–	California	0	2	—

- Fresno State qualifies for WCWS, 2–0

Midwest Regional
–	Nebraska	6	3^{9}	—
–	Utah	0	2	—

- Nebraska qualifies for WCWS, 2–0

West Regional
–	Cal State Fullerton	2	3	—
–	Cal Poly Pomona	1	0	—

- Cal State Fullerton qualifies for WCWS, 2–0

South Regional
–	Florida State	1^{9}	3^{13}	—
–	Adelphi	0	1	—

- Florida State qualifies for WCWS, 2–0

Central Regional
–	Texas A&M	4	2	—
–	Louisiana Tech	0	1	—

- Texas A&M qualifies for WCWS, 2–0

Mideast Regional
–	Central Michigan	0	7	5^{11}
–	Northwestern	2	0	4

- Central Michigan qualifies for WCWS, 2–1

== Women's College World Series ==
=== Participants ===
- Arizona State
- Cal State Fullerton
- Central Michigan
- Florida State
- Fresno State
- Nebraska
- Texas A&M
- UCLA

=== Game results ===
==== Bracket ====
Upper round 1
UCLA	1^{9}
Arizona State	0
Nebraska	1
Fresno State	0
Cal State Fullerton	3
Florida State	0
Texas A&M	3
Central Michigan	0

Upper round 2
UCLA	3
Nebraska	0
Cal State Fullerton	1
Texas A&M	2^{13}
Lower round 1
Arizona State	0
Fresno State	3
Florida State	0
Central Michigan	1

Upper final
UCLA	1
Texas A&M	0
Lower round 2
Cal State Fullerton	2
Fresno State	1
Nebraska	2
Central Michigan	1

Semifinals
UCLA	2
Cal State Fullerton	1
Texas A&M	4
Nebraska	0

Final
UCLA	0	1
Texas A&M	1	4

==== Game log ====
Date	Game	Winning team	Score	Losing team	Notes
May 20	Game 1	UCLA	1–0^{9}	Arizona State	
May 20	Game 2	Nebraska	1–0	Fresno State	
May 21	Game 3	Cal State Fullerton	3–0	Florida State	
May 21	Game 4	Texas A&M	3–0	Central Michigan	
May 22	Game 5	Fresno State	3–0	Arizona State	Arizona State eliminated
May 22	Game 6	Central Michigan	1–0	Florida State	Florida State eliminated
May 22	Game 7	UCLA	3–0	Nebraska	
May 22	Game 8	Texas A&M	2–1^{13}	Cal State Fullerton	
May 23	Game 9	Nebraska	2–1	Central Michigan	Central Michigan eliminated
May 23	Game 10	Cal State Fullerton	2–1	Fresno State	Fresno State eliminated
May 23	Game 11	UCLA	1–0	Texas A&M	
May 23	Game 12	Texas A&M	4–0	Nebraska	Nebraska eliminated
May 23	Game 13	UCLA	1–0	Cal State Fullerton	Cal State Fullerton eliminated
May 24	Game 14	Texas A&M	1–0	UCLA	
May 24	Game 15	Texas A&M	4–1	UCLA	Texas A&M wins WCWS

=== Championship Game ===
School	Top Batter	Stats.
Texas A&M Aggies	Shawn Andaya (P)	1-3 2RBIs
UCLA Bruins	Janice Parks (3B)	1-3 RBI K

School	Pitcher	IP	H	R	ER	BB	SO	AB	BF
Texas A&M Aggies	Shawn Andaya (W)	7.0	2	1	1	1	6	24	25
UCLA Bruins	Michelle Phillips (L)	0.0	3	1	1	1	0	3	4
UCLA Bruins	Samantha Ford	6.0	7	3	3	0	1	25	25

=== All-Tournament Team ===
The following players were named to the All-Tournament Team

Pos	Name	School
P	Shawn Andaya	Texas A&M
P	Lisa Longaker	UCLA
1B	Gena Strang	Fresno State
2B	Julie Smith	Texas A&M
3B	Janice Parks	UCLA
SS	Liz Mizera	Texas A&M
OF	Karen Walker	UCLA
OF	Sandra Arledge	UCLA
OF	Chenita Rogers	Cal State Fullerton
C	Kris Tipmore	Central Michigan
AL	Lisa Hankerd	UCLA
AL	Shauna Wattenberg	UCLA

== See also ==
- 1987 NCAA Division II softball tournament
- 1987 NCAA Division III softball tournament
- 1987 NAIA softball tournament
- 1987 NCAA Division I baseball tournament
