= 2010 NCAA Division I softball tournament =

- Teams: 64
- Finals site: ASA Hall of Fame Stadium; Oklahoma City
- Champions: UCLA (12th NCAA (13th overall) title)
- Runner-up: Arizona (22nd WCWS Appearance)
- Winning coach: Kelly Inouye-Perez (1st title)
- MOP: Megan Langenfeld (UCLA)

The 2010 NCAA Division 1 softball tournament was held from May 20 through June 8, 2010 and is part of the 2010 NCAA Division 1 softball season. The 64 NCAA Division 1 college softball teams were selected out of an eligible 284 teams on May 16, 2010. 30 teams were awarded an automatic bid as champions of their conference, and 34 teams were selected at-large by the NCAA Division 1 Softball Selection Committee. The tournament culminated with eight teams playing in the 2010 Women's College World Series at ASA Hall of Fame Stadium in Oklahoma City, Oklahoma. UCLA won their record 11th championship, defeating Arizona in the final.

== Automatic bids ==
Conference	Champion
ACC	Georgia Tech
America East	Boston University
Atlantic 10	UMass
Atlantic Sun	Lipscomb
Big 10	Michigan
Big 12	Oklahoma
Big East	Syracuse
Big South	Radford
Big West	UC Davis
Colonial	Hofstra
Conference-USA	East Carolina
Horizon	Wright State
Ivy	Cornell
Mid-American	Ball State
Metro Atlantic	Iona
Mid-Eastern	Bethune–Cookman
Missouri Valley	Creighton
Mountain West	BYU
Northeast	Long Island
Ohio Valley	Jacksonville State
Pac-10	Washington
Pacific Coast	Saint Mary's
Patriot	Bucknell
SEC	Alabama
Southern	Elon
Southland	McNeese State
SWAC	Alcorn State
Summit	North Dakota State
Sun Belt	Louisiana–Lafayette
WAC	Hawaii

== National seeds ==
Teams in "italics" advanced to super regionals. Teams in "bold" advanced to Women's College World Series.

1. Alabama
2. Michigan
3. Washington
4. Florida
5. UCLA
6. Georgia
7. Texas
8. Georgia Tech
9. Missouri
10. Arizona
11. California
12. LSU
13. Arizona State
14. Oklahoma
15. Tennessee
16. Hawaii

== Regionals and super regionals ==
=== Tuscaloosa Super Regional ===
First round	Round 2
1	Alabama	9
Alcorn State	0
1	Alabama	5
Lipscomb	2
Lipscomb	4
UAB	1
Tuscaloosa Regional
Alcorn State	1
UAB	10
Lipscomb	7
UAB	6
16	Hawaii	10
UC Davis	2
16	Hawaii	6
Stanford	3
Stanford	5
Texas Tech	4
Stanford Regional
UC Davis	0
Texas Tech	1
Stanford	3
Texas Tech	6

Regional finals
1	Alabama	6	—
Lipscomb	0	—
16	Hawaii	7	—
Texas Tech	1	—

Super regionals
1	Alabama	8	7	4
16	Hawaii	0	8	5

=== Columbia Super Regional ===
First round	Round 2
8	Georgia Tech	5
Jacksonville State	3
8	Georgia Tech	2
Oregon	11
Oregon	1
Auburn	0
Atlanta Regional
Jacksonville State	1
Auburn	15
8	Georgia Tech	4
Auburn	1
9	Missouri	3
Creighton	2
9	Missouri	3
Illinois	1
DePaul	2
Illinois	4
Columbia Regional
Creighton	2
DePaul	3
Illinois	9
DePaul	1

Regional finals
Oregon	4	—
8	Georgia Tech	3	—
9	Missouri	4	—
Illinois	2	—

Super regionals
Oregon	0	2	—
9	Missouri	1	7	—

=== Los Angeles Super Regional ===
Round 1	Round 2
5	UCLA	11
Saint Mary's	4
5	UCLA	4
San Diego State	3
Fresno State	2
San Diego State	3
Los Angeles Regional
Saint Mary's	0
Fresno State	6
San Diego State	3
Fresno State	4
12	LSU	6
McNeese State	0
12	LSU	0
Louisiana–Lafayette	1
Texas A&M	0
Louisiana–Lafayette	5
Baton Rouge Regional
McNeese State	0
Texas A&M	2
12	LSU	0
Texas A&M	1

Regional finals
5	UCLA	7	—
Fresno State	2	—
Louisiana–Lafayette	6	—
Texas A&M	1	—

Super regionals
5	UCLA	10	10	—
Louisiana–Lafayette	2	1	—

=== Gainesville Super Regional ===
Round 1	Round 2
4	Florida	6
Bethune–Cookman	0
4	Florida	6
UCF	0
UCF	7
FIU	1
Gainesville Regional
Bethune–Cookman	0
FIU	2
UCF	0
FIU	7
13	Arizona State	6
Boston University	1
13	Arizona State	3
Long Island	2
Long Island	3
UMass	1
Amherst Regional
Boston University	10
UMass	4
Long Island	5
Boston University	4

Regional finals
4	Florida	13	—
FIU	3	—
13	Arizona State	9	—
Long Island	1	—

Super regionals
4	Florida	8	5	—
13	Arizona State	0	2	—

=== Seattle Super Regional ===
Round 1	Round 2
3	Washington	3
North Dakota State	0
3	Washington	1
North Carolina	0
Nebraska	0
North Carolina	1
Seattle Regional
North Dakota State	1
Nebraska	5
North Carolina	1
Nebraska	0
14	Oklahoma	10
Syracuse	0
14	Oklahoma	1
Fordham	0
Fordham	2
Maryland	1
College Park Regional
Syracuse	1
Maryland	4
Fordham	5
Maryland	2

Regional finals
3	Washington	2	—
North Carolina	1	—
14	Oklahoma	2	—
Fordham	0	—

Super regionals
3	Washington	1	3	4
14	Oklahoma	6	0	0

=== Athens Super Regional ===
Round 1	Round 2
6	Georgia	10
Elon	4
6	Georgia	5
Florida State	2
Florida State	10
Radford	1
Athens Regional
Elon	0
Radford	8
Florida State	2
Radford	3
11	California	10
Bucknell	0
11	California	1
Kentucky	0
Kentucky	6
Ohio State	5
Columbus Regional
Bucknell	0
Ohio State	6
Kentucky	3
Ohio State	5

Regional finals
6	Georgia	8	—
Radford	1	—
11	California	7	—
Ohio State	0	—

Super regionals
6	Georgia	7	10	—
11	California	0	1	—

=== Tucson Super Regional ===
Round 1	Round 2
7	Texas	6
Iona	0
7	Texas	8
BYU	9
East Carolina	0
BYU	1
Austin Regional
Iona	0
East Carolina	3
7	Texas	0
East Carolina	1
10	Arizona	9
Cornell	0
10	Arizona	6
Hofstra	0
Oklahoma State	6
Hofstra	8
Tucson Regional
Cornell	0
Oklahoma State	7
Hofstra	5
Oklahoma State	2

Regional finals
BYU	8	—
East Carolina	3	—
10	Arizona	10	—
Hofstra	6	—

Super regionals
BYU	1	2	—
10	Arizona	2	10	—

=== Ann Arbor Super Regional ===
Round 1	Round 2
2	Michigan	11
Wright State	2
2	Michigan	8
Notre Dame	0
Notre Dame	1
Illinois State	0
Ann Arbor Regional
Wright State	10
Illinois State	8
Notre Dame	6
Wright State	5
15	Tennessee	5
Ball State	0
15	Tennessee	11
Virginia	2
Virginia	1
Louisville	0
Knoxville Regional
Ball State	1
Louisville	5
Virginia	4
Louisville	7

Regional finals
2	Michigan	12	—
Notre Dame	2	—
15	Tennessee	3	—
Louisville	1	—

Super regionals
2	Michigan	0	3	—
15	Tennessee	5	4	—

== Women's College World Series ==
=== Rule changes ===
==== Field dimensions ====
Whereas in previous years, the outfield fence was set at 190 feet from home plate and standing four feet in height, the fence was moved back to 200 feet and raised to a height of six feet for this year's tournament. Despite the change, the 2010 Series saw a record-breaking number of home runs resulting from "some of the power brought into the game by composite-barreled bats."

==== Illegal pitching ====
The 2010 WCWS was marked by a proliferation of illegal pitch calls, following a memo by NCAA Softball Secretary Rules Editor Dee Abrahamson outlining an increased emphasis on legal pitching. Arizona Wildcats pitcher Kenzie Fowler, in particular, was cited for eight illegal pitches in Arizona's first-round 9-0 loss to Tennessee, and a further eight illegal pitches in Arizona's second-round 4-3 win over Washington; Fowler was cited for 16 of the 22 illegal pitches called in the first eight games of the tournament. Wildcats coach Mike Candrea reacted by saying that "the officials were way too involved in [the Tennessee] game," and that the citation of illegal pitches was "sporadic."

=== Participants ===
School	Conference	Record (conference)	Head coach	WCWS appearances† (including 2010 WCWS)	WCWS best finish†	WCWS W–L record† (excluding 2010 WCWS)
Arizona	Pacific-10	48–11 (13–8)	Mike Candrea	22 (last: 2009)	1st (1991, 1993, 1994, 1996, 1997, 2001, 2006, 2007)	57–29
Florida	Southeastern	48–8 (20–4)	Tim Walton	3 (last: 2009)	2nd (2009)	6–4
Georgia	Southeastern	48–11 (18–8)	Lu Harris-Champer	2 (last: 2009)	3rd (2009)	3–2
Hawaii	WAC	49–15 (19–1)	Bob Coolen	1	-	-
Missouri	Big 12	56–11 (11–7)	Ehren Earleywine	5 (last: 2009)	5th (1991)	1–8
Tennessee	Southeastern	47–13 (17–8)	Ralph Weekly; Karen Weekly	4 (last: 2007)	2nd (2007)	10–6
UCLA	Pacific-10	45–11 (14–7)	Kelly Inouye-Perez	25 (last: 2008)	1st (1982, 1984, 1985, 1988, 1989, 1990, 1992, 1999, 2003, 2004)	89–29
Washington	Pacific-10	50–7 (17–4)	Heather Tarr	9 (last: 2009)	1st (2009)	20–15

† Excludes results of the pre-NCAA Women's College World Series of 1969 through 1981.

=== Results ===
==== Bracket ====
First round
16	Hawaii	3
9	Missouri	2
4	Florida	3
5	UCLA	16
9	Missouri	0
4	Florida	5
3	Washington	3
6	Georgia	6
10	Arizona	0
15	Tennessee	9
10	Arizona	4
3	Washington	3

Second round
16	Hawaii	2
5	UCLA	5
6	Georgia	3
4	Florida	2
6	Georgia	5
15	Tennessee	7
16	Hawaii	1
10	Arizona	5

Semifinals
5	UCLA	5	—
6	Georgia	2	—
15	Tennessee	0	2
10	Arizona	8	5

Finals
5	UCLA	6	15	—
10	Arizona	5	9	—

==== Game results ====
Date	Game	Winner	Score	Loser	Notes
June 3, 2010	Game 1	Hawaii	3–2	Missouri	Alexandra Aguirre and Traci Yoshikawa homered for HI; Rhea Taylor homered for MO
June 3, 2010	Game 2	UCLA	16–3 (6 inn)	Florida	Andrea Harrison homered twice and Megan Langenfeld homered for UCLA
June 3, 2010	Game 3	Tennessee	9–0 (5 inn)	Arizona	Kenzie Fowler called for eight illegal pitches; Ivy Renfroe pitched a 3-hit shutout
June 3, 2010	Game 4	Georgia	6–3	Washington	Kristyn Sandberg and Megan Wiggins homered for GA
June 4, 2010	Game 5	UCLA	5–2	Hawaii	Samantha Camuso, Julie Burney, and Andrea Harrison hit home runs for UCLA; Alexandra Aguirre homered for HI
June 4, 2010	Game 6	Tennessee	7–5	Georgia	Erinn Webb hit a grand slam for TN; Ashley Razey homered for GA
June 5, 2010	Game 7	Florida	5–0	Missouri	Brittany Schutte homered twice and Kelsey Bruder homered for FL
June 5, 2010	Game 8	Arizona	4–3	Washington	Kenzie Fowler called for eight illegal pitches; Danielle Lawrie's final collegiate performance
June 5, 2010	Game 9	Georgia	3–2	Florida	Alisa Goler homered for GA; Brittany Schutte homered for FL; Kristyn Sandberg left with knee sprain
June 5, 2010	Game 10	Arizona	5–1	Hawaii	Kenzie Fowler called for five illegal pitches; Traci Yoshikawa homered for HI
June 6, 2010	Game 11	UCLA	5–2	Georgia	B. B. Bates and Samantha Camuso homered for UCLA
June 6, 2010	Game 12	Arizona	8–0 (5 inn)	Tennessee	Game ended by run-ahead rule
June 6, 2010	Game 13	Arizona	5–2	Tennessee	Stacie Chambers and K'Lee Arredondo homered for AZ
June 7, 2010	Finals game 1	UCLA	6–5 (8 inn)	Arizona	Seventh World Series between UCLA and Arizona; Megan Langenfeld homered twice for UCLA; K'Lee Arredondo and Stacie Chambers homered for AZ
June 8, 2010	Finals game 2	UCLA	15–9	Arizona	Andrea Harrison hit a grand slam and Megan Langenfeld, Julie Burney and Samantha Camuso homered for UCLA; Stacie Chambers homered twice and Lini Koria homered for AZ

==== Championship game ====
School	Top Batter	Stats.
UCLA	Julie Burney (3B)	3-5 3RBIs HR K
Arizona	Stacie Chambers (C)	2-3 4RBIs 2HRs BB K

School	Pitcher	IP	H	R	ER	BB	SO	AB	BF
UCLA	Aleah Macon (W)	4.1	6	6	6	3	7	18	23
UCLA	Donna Kerr	2.2	4	3	3	2	4	12	15
Arizona	Kenzie Fowler (L)	1.0	2	3	3	3	0	5	9
Arizona	Sarah Akamine	4.0	15	11	11	3	3	27	31
Arizona	Ashley Ralston	2.0	2	1	1	1	2	8	9

==== Final standings ====
Place	School	WCWS record
1st	UCLA	5–0
2nd	Arizona	4–3
3rd	Tennessee	2–2
3rd	Georgia	2–2
5th	Florida	1–2
5th	Hawaii	1–2
7th	Washington	0–2
7th	Missouri	0–2

=== WCWS records ===
- Home runs, game (individual), 2 - tied with Yvonne Gutierrez (UCLA, 1992), Lindsey Collins (Arizona, 1999), & Francesca Enea (Florida, 2008)

In Game 2, Andrea Harrison hit two home runs in UCLA's 16-3 win over Florida.
In Game 7, Brittany Schutte hit two home runs in Florida's 5-0 win over Missouri.
In Game 14, Megan Langenfeld hit two home runs in UCLA's 8-inning 6-5 win over Arizona.
In Game 15, Stacie Chambers hit two home runs in Arizona's game against UCLA.

- Home runs, Series (individual), 4 - new record, surpassing former record of 3 (Gutierrez in 1992; Toni Mascarenas in 2001; Tairia Mims in 2003)

Megan Langenfeld hit one home run in Game 2, two home runs in Game 14, and one home run in Game 15.
Andrea Harrison hit two home runs in Game 2, one home run in Game 5, and a grand slam in Game 15.
Stacie Chambers hit one home run in Game 13, one home run in Game 14, and two home runes in Game 15.

- Multi-home run games, Series (total), 4 - new record, surpassing former record of one (Gutierrez in 1992, Collins in 1999, & Enea in 2008)
- Multi-home run games, Series (team), 2 by UCLA - new record, surpassing former record of one (UCLA in 1992, Arizona in 1999, Florida in 2008)
- Home runs, Series (team), 14 by UCLA - new record

Samantha Camuso hit UCLA's 14th home run of the Series in Game 15.

- Home runs, Series (total), 35 - new record, surpassing former record of 24 (2009)

K'Lee Arredondo hit the 24th home run of the Series in Game 13
Megan Langenfeld hit the 25th home run of the Series in Game 14.
Stacie Chambers hit the 35th home run of the Series in Game 15.

- RBI, Series (individual), 11 - new record, surpassing former record of 7 (Niki Williams in 2009)

In Game 15, Andrea Harrison hit a grand slam to collect her 8th, 9th, 10th, and 11th RBI

- Runs, Series (total), 141 - new record, surpassing former record of 120 (2010)

In Game 15, UCLA scored the Tournament's 120th, 121st, 122nd and 123rd runs in a 4-run second inning, while Arizona scored the Tournament's 141st run in the bottom of the ninth inning.

==== Championship game records ====
- Home runs (total), 7 by UCLA and Arizona (4 and 3 in Game 2) - new record, surpassing former record of 3
- Grand slams (individual), 1 (Andrea Harrison in Game 2) - new record
- Grand slams (team), 1 (UCLA in Game 2) - new record
- Runs (team), 15 by UCLA (Game 2) - new record, surpassing former record of 11 (ASU, 2008 Game 2)
- Runs (total), 24 by UCLA and Arizona (15 and 9 in Game 2) - new record, surpassing former record of 19
- Hits (team), 19 by UCLA (Game 2) - new record, surpassing former record of 17 (Iowa, May 27, 1995)
- RBI (team), 15 by UCLA (Game 2) - new record, surpassing former record of 11 (ASU, 2008 Game 2)

Note: The above records exclude those of the pre-NCAA Women's College World Series of 1969 through 1981.

=== Most Outstanding Player ===
Megan Langenfeld was unanimously voted the tournament's Most Outstanding Player. She batted .705, going 12-for-17 with four home runs and nine RBIs, as well as reaching base in 18 of 23 plate appearances for an OBP of .782 with four walks and two hit by pitch.
