= Kelly Inouye-Perez =

American softball player and coach

Current position
- Title: Head coach
- Team: UCLA
- Conference: Big Ten
- Record: 895–225–1 (.799)

Biographical details
- Born: January 2, 1970 (age 56); Los Angeles, California, U.S.

Playing career
- 1989–1993: UCLA
- Position: Catcher

Coaching career (HC unless noted)
- 1994–2006: UCLA (asst.)
- 2007–present: UCLA

Head coaching record
- Overall: 895–225–1 (.799)
- Tournaments: NCAA Division I: 84–32 (.724)

Accomplishments and honors

Championships
- As coach: 2× Women's College World Series (2010, 2019); 4× Pac-10/12 regular season (2009, 2019, 2021, 2023); As player: 3× Women's College World Series (1989, 1990, 1992)

Awards
- NFCA National Coaching Staff of the Year (2019); NFCA West Regional Coaching Staff of the Year (2019); 4× Pac-12 Coach of the Year (2009, 2021, 2023, 2024); Inducted into the 2022 class of the UCLA Athletics Hall of Fame (2022)

Kelly Keiko Inouye-Perez (born January 2, 1970) is an American former softball player who is the current head coach at UCLA Bruins softball.

She is the only person to have ever won an NCAA Softball Championship as a coach and as a player.

== Playing career ==
As a player, she was a catcher for UCLA and helped her team to three National Championships (1989, 1990 and 1992) and a finish as National Runner-Up in her four playing seasons. She missed the 1991 season due to shoulder surgery.

== Coaching career ==
She is the current head coach at UCLA Bruins softball, having assumed that position prior to the 2007 season. She has led the Bruins to five appearances in the Women's College World Series, including the 2010 National Championship and 2019 National Championship, and led them to an appearance in the NCAA Division I softball tournament each year of her tenure. In 2026 she became the all-time winningest coach of the Bruins, themselves the all-time winningest NCAA Division I softball program.

== Personal life ==
Inouye-Perez is of Japanese and Hawaiian descent. She is married to Gerardo Perez, a current baseball coach who played at Cerritos College and Loyola Marymount University. The couple has two children, Mikey Perez, a former UCLA Bruins baseball player who was drafted by the Minnesota Twins in 2021, and Kylie Perez, a soccer player who played at Long Beach State and the University of San Diego.

== Head coaching record ==
Record table
Season	Team	Overall	Conference	Standing	Postseason
UCLA Bruins (Pacific-10/Pac-12 Conference) (2007–2024)
2007	UCLA	37–18	12–9	T–3rd	NCAA Regionals
2008	UCLA	51–9	17–4	2nd	Women's College World Series
2009	UCLA	45–11	16–5	1st	NCAA Super Regionals
2010	UCLA	50–11	14–7	2nd	WCWS Champions
2011	UCLA	36–19	9–12	T–6th	NCAA Regionals
2012	UCLA	36–20	12–12	T–4th	NCAA Regionals
2013	UCLA	40–20	10–14	T–5th	NCAA Regionals
2014	UCLA	52–8	19–5	2nd	NCAA Super Regionals
2015	UCLA	51–12	19–5	2nd	Women's College World Series
2016	UCLA	40–16–1	16–5–1	2nd	Women's College World Series
2017	UCLA	48–15	16–8	T–3rd	Women's College World Series
2018	UCLA	58–7	20–4	T–3rd	Women's College World Series
2019	UCLA	56–6	20–4	T–1st	WCWS Champions
2020	UCLA	25–1	0–0		Season canceled due to COVID-19
2021	UCLA	47–7	19–2	1st	Women's College World Series
2022	UCLA	51–10	19–5	2nd	Women's College World Series
2023	UCLA	52–7	21–3	1st	NCAA Regionals
2024	UCLA	43–12	17–4	1st	Women's College World Series
UCLA (Pacific-10/Pac-12 Conference):		787–202–1 (.795)	259–103–1 (.715)		
UCLA Bruins (Big Ten Conference) (2025–Present)
2025	UCLA	55–13	17–5	T–2nd	Women's College World Series
2026	UCLA	53–10	20–4	T–2nd	Women's College World Series
UCLA (Big Ten Conference):		108–23 (.824)	37–9 (.804)		
Total:		895–225–1 (.799)			
National champion Postseason invitational champion Conference regular season champion Conference regular season and conference tournament champion Division regular season champion Division regular season and conference tournament champion Conference tournament champion
