= Megan Langenfeld =

American softball player and coach

Current position
- Title: Pitching coach
- Team: UC Riverside
- Conference: Big West

Biographical details
- Born: January 17, 1988 (age 37); Bakersfield, California, U.S.

Playing career
- 2007–2010: UCLA
- 2011: Denso Bright Pegasus
- Position: Pitcher

Coaching career (HC unless noted)
- 2011: UCLA (undergrad. asst.)
- 2014: Arkansas (grad. asst.)
- 2015–2017: Stanford (asst.)
- 2018: UC Riverside (pitching)
- 2019–present: Oregon Ducks softball (asst.)

Accomplishments and honors

Championships
- As player: Women's College World Series (2010); Pac-10 (2009)

Awards
- Women's College World Series MOP (2010); 2× first-team NFCA All-American (2009, 2010); Pac-10 Player of the Year (2010)

Megan Diane Langenfeld (born January 17, 1988) is an American, former collegiate All-American, softball pitcher and current assistant coach. She attended Centennial High School. She played infielder and pitcher for the UCLA Bruins in the Pac-12 Conference and is school career leader in saves. She led the Bruins to a title win at the 2010 Women's College World Series and was named MVP. As a member of the United States women's national softball team she won 2011 World Cup of Softball. Langenfeld is currently an assistant coach for the Oregon Ducks softball.

Langenfeld was inducted into the UCLA Athletics Hall of Fame as a member of the 2022 class.

== Career statistics ==
UCLA Bruins
| YEAR | W | L | GP | GS | CG | SHO | SV | IP | H | R | ER | BB | SO | ERA | WHIP |
| 2007 | 14 | 3 | 26 | 19 | 14 | 7 | 1 | 130.2 | 115 | 35 | 27 | 20 | 93 | 1.45 | 1.03 |
| 2008 | 8 | 2 | 21 | 6 | 2 | 1 | 5 | 66.2 | 41 | 18 | 15 | 12 | 67 | 1.58 | 0.80 |
| 2009 | 17 | 3 | 32 | 15 | 12 | 4 | 3 | 141.2 | 75 | 35 | 25 | 19 | 112 | 1.24 | 0.66 |
| 2010 | 14 | 1 | 25 | 8 | 6 | 1 | 3 | 114.1 | 84 | 32 | 25 | 25 | 76 | 1.53 | 0.95 |
| TOTALS | 53 | 9 | 104 | 48 | 34 | 13 | 12 | 453.1 | 315 | 120 | 92 | 76 | 348 | 1.42 | 0.86 |

UCLA Bruins
| YEAR | G | AB | R | H | BA | RBI | HR | 3B | 2B | TB | SLG | BB | SO | SB | SBA |
| 2007 | 55 | 149 | 21 | 47 | .315 | 41 | 7 | 1 | 12 | 82 | .550% | 24 | 26 | 1 | 1 |
| 2008 | 56 | 152 | 19 | 53 | .348 | 41 | 5 | 0 | 10 | 78 | .513% | 34 | 19 | 0 | 0 |
| 2009 | 50 | 141 | 22 | 52 | .369 | 30 | 7 | 1 | 8 | 83 | .588% | 20 | 16 | 0 | 0 |
| 2010 | 50 | 129 | 50 | 68 | .527 | 58 | 20 | 0 | 12 | 140 | 1.085% | 43 | 15 | 0 | 0 |
| TOTALS | 211 | 571 | 112 | 220 | .385 | 170 | 39 | 2 | 42 | 383 | .670% | 121 | 76 | 1 | 1 |
