= Sharron Backus =

American softball player and coach

Biographical details
- Born: February 12, 1946 (age 80)

Playing career
- 1961–1963: Whittier Gold Sox
- 1964–1966: Orange, CA Lionettes
- 1967–1975: Raybestos Brakettes
- Positions: Shortstop, Third baseman

Coaching career (HC unless noted)
- 1975–1997: UCLA

Head coaching record
- Overall: 847–167–3

Accomplishments and honors

Championships
- 8× Women's College World Series (1978, 1982, 1984, 1985, 1988, 1989, 1990, 1992)

Awards
- 4× Pac-12 Coach of the Year (1990, 1992, 1993, 1995)

Sharron Backus (born February 12, 1946) is a former softball player and coach. She played as a shortstop and third baseman on seven Amateur Softball Association national championship teams from 1961 to 1975. She served as the head softball coach at UCLA from 1975 to 1997 and led her teams to nine national collegiate softball championships. At the time of her retirement in 1997, she was the winningest college softball coach in the history of the sport. Backus has been inducted into both the National Softball Hall of Fame and the National Fastpitch Coaches Association Hall of Fame.

== Softball player ==
Backus attended Cal State Fullerton and played for 15 years as a shortstop and third baseman in the Amateur Softball Association ("ASA") from 1961 to 1975. She played on seven ASA championship teams, including the 1961 national championship with the Whittier Gold Sox and five national championships with the Raybestos Brakettes between 1971 and 1975. She also played on two teams that won international crowns. Backus was a second-team All-American in 1961 with the Gold Sox and a first-team All-American in 1964 and 1966 with the Orange, California Lionettes.

== UCLA ==
Backus began her coaching career at UCLA in 1975. She was the head softball coach at UCLA for 23 years from 1975 to 1997 and led the Bruins to nine national championships.

Backus was hired as a part-time coach by Judith Holland, UCLA senior associate athletic director. Holland recalled, "I had seen her play, and she was probably one of the best shortstops who ever played the game." Backus was a physical education teacher at Western High School in Anaheim, California when she was hired by UCLA and kept her teaching job for the first couple years after being hired at UCLA. Backus taught in Anaheim in the mornings and drove to UCLA for practice and games in the afternoon. Holland recalled that UCLA paid Backus about $1,500 year as a part-time coach, "and I don't think the money even paid for her gas."

In Backus's first three years at UCLA, the team struggled. Between 1975 and 1977, UCLA compiled a record of 44–20. In the formative years of the program, the Bruins played at city parks, where they were "often bumped from fields by recreational softball leagues." Backus moved her team to the UCLA intramural field, but it was not until 1980 that her team got its own field.

In 1978, the Bruins won their first national softball championship with a 31–3 record. After women's softball became an NCAA sport in 1982, Backus's teams won six of the first nine NCAA softball tournaments. In all, Backus led UCLA to eight NCAA tournament championships (in addition to the 1978 pre-NCAA championship) in 1982 (33–7–2), 1984 (45–6–1), 1985 (41–9), 1988 (53–8), 1989 (48–4), 1990 (62–7), 1992 (54–2), and 1995 (50–6).

From 1988 to 1990, the Bruins won three consecutive NCAA championships and compiled a record of 163–19. Backus's success led the Los Angeles Times in 1990 to compare Backus to UCLA's legendary basketball coach John Wooden:

"When you talk about UCLA dynasties, you start with John Wooden, who coached the men's basketball team to 10 NCAA titles. But Backus has built a dynasty of her own. ... In total, the Bruins have won seven national titles, finished second twice and third twice in Backus' 15 seasons."

Commenting on the pressure and anxiety fostered by success, Backus noted, "John Wooden once said that he wished one national championship to his best friends, but four to his enemies."

In December 1995, the UCLA women's softball program was placed on probation after an investigation revealed that UCLA had awarded more scholarships than were permitted under UCLA rules. The Fresno Bee wrote that the penalties "bring shame to college softball and added, "The image of UCLA's softball program won't ever be the same. The Bruins got caught. ... For two seasons, they went over the scholarship limit, the equivalent of cheating on taxes. Now they must pay."

Amid an NCAA probe prompted by a Los Angeles Times investigation into UCLA pitcher Tanya Harding, Backus announced her retirement in January 1997 after 21 years as the team's head coach. Backus compiled a record of 847 wins, 167 losses and 3 ties at UCLA. At the time of her retirement, she was "the winningest college softball coach" in the history of the sport. Backus told the press when she retired, "I've had a great career at UCLA, but it's time for a change. My primary reason for stepping down has to do with the illness and death of my mother in early October. That, plus the ongoing NCAA probe of the softball program have created a level of stress that I feel is best to put behind me at this time."

Backus coached 29 All-Americans and numerous top players at UCLA, including Dot Richardson, Lisa Fernandez (the first softball player to win the Honda-Broderick Cup as the top female collegiate athlete), Sheila Cornell-Douty, Kerry Dienelt, Debbie Doom, Jennifer Brundage, Joanne Brown, Tanya Harding, Sue Enquist, Lisa Longaker (three-time All-American), Samantha Ford, Tiffany Boyd, Lorraine Maynez, DeeDee Weiman, Yvonne Gutierrez, Heather Compton, Tracy Compton, Shanna Flynn, Shelly Montgomery, Missy Phillips, Leslie Rover, Monica Tourville, Lisa Richardson, Jan Jeffers, Karen Andrews, Tricia Mang, Alleah Poulson and Jancie Park.

== Women's Pro Fastpitch ==
In 1998, Backus coached the Orlando Wahoos in the Women's Pro Fastpitch league. WPF league director Rayla Allison said at the time, "With Sharron, we've stepped up the level of professionalism and improved our marketability. Her name will be a big drawing card for fans, players and coaches." Backus noted that her goals were to attract youngsters to the game and to bolster the league so that it might reach the status of the Women's National Basketball Association.

== Honors and recognition ==
Backus was inducted into the Amateur Softball Association's National Softball Hall of Fame in 1985, and the National Fastpitch Coaches Association Hall of Fame in 1991. She has also been inducted into the Women's Sports Foundation Hall of Fame.

== See also ==
- List of college softball coaches with 800 career wins
