= Easton Stadium =

Stadium in Los Angeles, California

- Interactive map of Easton Stadium
- Location: Los Angeles, California; United States
- Coordinates: 34.076186°N 118.45331034°W
- Capacity: 1,328
- Surface: Natural grass
- Field size: 190' LF, 210' CF, 190' RF

Construction
- Opened: 1994; 32 years ago 2004–2005; 21 years ago (renovated)

Tenants
- UCLA Bruins softball - (NCAA); 1994 – present

Easton Stadium is a college softball stadium on the campus of the University of California, Los Angeles. It is the home venue of the UCLA Bruins softball team of the Big Ten Conference. It is named for James Easton, class of 1959, who has provided significant funding for the stadium. Easton Stadium is located on the northwest corner of the campus at Sunset Boulevard and Bellagio Road.

== Sunset Field ==
The original stadium on the site was known as Sunset Field and was constructed in 1979. It was the home of the Bruins through 1993.

== Current stadium ==
The current stadium was completed in 1994 and completely renovated in 2004–05, with chairback seating for 1,328 installed.
