= Sue Enquist =

American softball player and coach

Biographical details
- Born: August 24, 1957 (age 69); Los Angeles County, California, U.S.

Playing career
- 1975–1978: UCLA

Coaching career (HC unless noted)
- 1980–1988: UCLA (asst. coach)
- 1989–1996: UCLA (co-head coach)
- 1997–2006: UCLA (head coach)

Head coaching record
- Overall: 887–175–1 (.835)

Accomplishments and honors

Awards
- 3× Pac-12 Coach of the Year (1995, 1999, 2006)
Medal record
Women's softball
Representing the United States
World Games
Gold medal – first place	1981 Santa Clara	Team competition

Susan Enquist (born August 24, 1957) is an American former softball player and coach. She played softball at UCLA under Sharron Backus from 1975 to 1978. She helped lead UCLA to its first national softball championship in the 1978 Women's College World Series and became UCLA's first All-American softball player.

== Playing career ==
Her career batting average of .401 was the UCLA team record for 24 years. She also played for the Raybestos Brakettes and helped lead the team to Amateur Softball Association national championships in 1976, 1977, 1978, and 1980.

== Coaching career ==
After receiving a bachelor's degree in kinesiology in 1980, Enquist joined the coaching staff of the UCLA softball team. She was an assistant coach under Sharron Backus from 1980 to 1988. In 1989, she was appointed as the co-head coach with Backus, a position she held for eight years from 1989 to 1996. Following Backus's retirement, Enquist became the sole head coach at UCLA in 1997, a position she held for ten years from 1997 to 2006. Enquist retired from UCLA in 2006.

In 18 years as the co-head coach and sole head coach at UCLA, Enquist compiled a record of 887–175–1. Her career winning percentage of .835 is the highest recorded by any of the college softball coaches with 800 career wins. During her years as a player and coach at UCLA, the Bruins softball team won 11 national championships in 1978, 1982, 1984, 1985, 1988, 1989, 1990, 1992, 1999, 2003, and 2004. Enquist has been honored with inductions into the International Women's Sports Hall of Fame in 2008, National Fastpitch Coaches Association Hall of Fame in 2006, the UCLA Hall of Fame in 1993, and the Capistrano Unified School District Hall of Fame in 2000.

== See also ==
- List of college softball coaches with 800 career wins
