= UCLA Bruins softball =

- 2026 UCLA Bruins softball team
- Founded: 1975 (51 years ago)
- University: University of California, Los Angeles
- Head coach: Kelly Inouye-Perez (20th season)
- Conference: Big Ten
- Location: Los Angeles, California
- Home stadium: Easton Stadium (capacity: 1,328)
- Nickname: Bruins
- Colors: Blue and gold

NCAA Tournament champions
- 1982, 1984, 1985, 1988, 1989, 1990, 1992, 1995*, 1999, 2003, 2004, 2010, 2019

AIAW Tournament champions
- 1978

NCAA WCWS runner-up
- 1987, 1991, 1993, 1997, 2000, 2001, 2005

NCAA WCWS appearances
- 1982, 1983, 1984, 1985, 1987, 1988, 1989, 1990, 1991, 1992, 1993, 1994, 1995*, 1996, 1997, 1999, 2000, 2001, 2002, 2003, 2004, 2005, 2006, 2008, 2010, 2015, 2016, 2017, 2018, 2019, 2021, 2022, 2024, 2025, 2026

AIAW WCWS appearances
- 1978, 1979 (runner-up), 1981

NCAA super regional appearances
- 2005, 2006, 2008, 2009, 2010, 2014, 2015, 2016, 2017, 2018, 2019, 2021, 2022, 2024, 2025, 2026

NCAA Tournament appearances
- 1982, 1983, 1984, 1985, 1987, 1988, 1989, 1990, 1991, 1992, 1993, 1994, 1995*, 1996, 1997, 1999, 2000, 2001, 2002, 2003, 2004, 2005, 2006, 2007, 2008, 2009, 2010, 2011, 2012, 2013, 2014, 2015, 2016, 2017, 2018, 2019, 2021, 2022, 2023, 2024, 2025, 2026

Conference tournament championships
- Pac-12: 2024

Regular-season conference championships
- SCWIAC: 1975, 1976; WCAA: 1983, 1984; Pac-10/12: 1987, 1988, 1989, 1990, 1991, 1993, 1999, 2002, 2006, 2009, 2019, 2021, 2023, 2024 *vacated by NCAA

The UCLA Bruins softball team represents the University of California, Los Angeles in NCAA Division I softball. The Bruins are one of the most decorated programs in all of NCAA softball, leading all schools in NCAA championships with 12, 13 overall Women's College World Series championships, championship game appearances with 22, WCWS appearances with 37, and NCAA Tournament wins with 187.

== History ==
=== Sharron Backus era ===
Judith Holland, UCLA senior associate athletic director, hired Sharon Backus as a part-time coach upon the program's founding in 1975. Holland recalled, "I had seen her play, and she was probably one of the best shortstops who ever played the game." Backus was a physical education teacher at a high school in Anaheim, California when she was hired by UCLA and kept her teaching job for the first couple years after being hired at UCLA. Backus taught in Anaheim in the mornings and drove to UCLA for practice and games in the afternoon. Holland recalled that UCLA paid Backus about $1,500 per year as a part-time coach, "and I don't think the money even paid for her gas."

In Backus's first three years at UCLA, the team struggled. Between 1975 and 1977, UCLA compiled a record of 44–20. In the formative years of the program, the Bruins played at city parks, where they were "often bumped from fields by recreational softball leagues." Backus moved her team to the UCLA intramural field, but it was not until 1980 that her team got its own field. Sunset Field and was constructed in 1979, and was the home of the Bruins through 1993.

In 1978, the Bruins won their first AIAW national softball championship with a 31–3 record. After women's softball became an NCAA sport in 1982, Backus's teams won six of the first nine NCAA softball tournaments. In all, Backus led UCLA to eight NCAA tournament championships (in addition to the 1978 pre-NCAA championship) in 1982 (33–7–2), 1984 (45–6–1), 1985 (41–9), 1988 (53–8), 1989 (48–4), 1990 (62–7), 1992 (54–2), and 1995 (50–6).

From 1988 to 1990, the Bruins won three consecutive NCAA championships and compiled a record of 163–19. Backus's success led the Los Angeles Times in 1990 to compare Backus to UCLA's legendary basketball coach John Wooden:

"When you talk about UCLA dynasties, you start with John Wooden, who coached the men's basketball team to 10 NCAA titles. But Backus has built a dynasty of her own. ... In total, the Bruins have won seven national titles, finished second twice and third twice in Backus' 15 seasons."

Commenting on the pressure and anxiety fostered by success, Backus noted, "John Wooden once said that he wished one national championship to his best friends, but four to his enemies."

==== Infractions ====
In December 1995, the UCLA women's softball program was placed on probation after an investigation revealed that UCLA had awarded more scholarships than were permitted under NCAA rules. Amid an NCAA probe prompted by a Los Angeles Times investigation into UCLA pitcher Tanya Harding, Backus announced her retirement in January 1997 after 21 years as the team's head coach. Backus compiled a record of 847 wins, 167 losses and 3 ties at UCLA. At the time of her retirement, she was "the winningest college softball coach" in the history of the sport. Backus told the press when she retired, "I've had a great career at UCLA, but it's time for a change. My primary reason for stepping down has to do with the illness and death of my mother in early October. That, plus the ongoing NCAA probe of the softball program have created a level of stress that I feel is best to put behind me at this time."

=== Sue Enquist era (1997–2006) ===
In 1989, Sue Enquist was appointed co-head coach with Backus, a position they shared through the 1996 season. Enquist played softball at UCLA under Sharron Backus from 1975 to 1978. She helped lead UCLA to its first national softball championship in 1978 and became UCLA's first All-American softball player. Her career batting average of .401 was the UCLA team record for 24 years. Prior to becoming co-head coach, she was an assistant coach under Backus from 1980 to 1988.

Following Backus's retirement, Enquist became the sole head coach at UCLA in 1997, a position she held for ten years from 1997 to 2006. Enquist retired from UCLA in 2006. In 18 years as the co-head coach and sole head coach at UCLA, Enquist compiled a record of 887–175–1. Her career winning percentage of .835 is the highest recorded by any of the college softball coaches with 800 career wins. During her years as a player and coach at UCLA, the Bruins softball team won 11 national championships in 1978, 1982, 1984, 1985, 1988, 1989, 1990, 1992, 1999, 2003 and 2004.

=== Kelly Inouye-Perez era (2007–present) ===
The UCLA Bruins are currently under the coaching of Kelly Inouye-Perez, who started in 2007. A former UCLA catcher, she played under Coach Sue Enquist. She was named First-Team All PAC-10 her freshman year and Second Team All-PAC-10 her sophomore season. She helped lead the Bruins to the 1989 and 1990 National championship before getting shoulder surgery in 1991. She came back the following year and got 2nd team All-PAC-10 honor and won the national championship with a 54-2 record on the season.

Perez was the assistant coach for the Bruins from 1994 to 2006. She helped accumulate a 617-150-1 overall record, three PAC-10 championships, seven championship game appearances, three national championships, and the National Coaching Staff of the Year award. She guided recognizable pitchers and catchers in the game like Stacey Nuveman, who became a three-time PAC-10 Player of the Year, four-time 1st team All-American, and NCAA's all-time single season and career home run leader.

She became only the third coach in UCLA softball history on January 1, 2007. As UCLA head coach, she accumulated 32 NFCA All-American awards, 67 All-Region honors, and 89 All Pacific-10/Pac-12 awards from her players. She brought two national championship back to the university in 2010 and 2019. She accomplished her 600th win of her career when she beat the Oklahoma Sooners in the national championship game in 2019.

Name	Position coached	Consecutive season at UCLA in current position
Kelly Inouye-Perez	Head coach	19th
Lisa Fernandez	Associate head coach	3rd
Mysha Sataraka	Assistant coach	1st
Rob Schweyer	Assistant coach	2nd
Claire Donyanavard	Director of softball operations	6th
Will Oldham	Director of player development & data analytics	3rd

== Head coaches ==
Name	Years	Won	Lost	Tied	Pct.
Sharron Backus	1975–1988	451	117	3	.794
Sharron Backus & Sue Enquist	1989–1996	403	56	0	.878
Sue Enquist	1997–2007	484	119	1	.803
Kelly Inouye-Perez	2007–present	544	166	1	.766

== Year-by-year results ==
Season	Coach	Record		Notes
Season	Coach	Overall	Conference	Notes
Southern California Women's Intercollegiate Athletic Conference
1975	Sharron Backus	14–6	9–0	SCWIAC Champions
1976	Sharron Backus	13–4	9–1	SCWIAC Champions
Independent
1977	Sharron Backus	17–10	—	
1978	Sharron Backus	31–13	—	AIAW National Champions
1979	Sharron Backus	24–9	—	AIAW College World Series (runner-up)
Western Collegiate Athletic Association
1980	Sharron Backus	24–13	11–5	
1981	Sharron Backus	38–10	10–5	AIAW College World Series (3rd place)
1982	Sharron Backus	33–7–2	15–4–1	NCAA Champions
1983	Sharron Backus	40–7	17–3	Women's College World Series (3rd place)
1984	Sharron Backus	45–6–1	7–3	NCAA Champions
1985	Sharron Backus	41–9	9–3	NCAA Champions
1986	Sharron Backus	28–15	10–2	
Pac-10
1987	Sharron Backus	50–10	7–3	Women's College World Series (runner-up)
1988	Sharron Backus	53–8	15–3	NCAA Champions
1989	Backus/Enquist	48–4	18–2	NCAA Champions
1990	Backus/Enquist	62–7	16–2	NCAA Champions
1991	Backus/Enquist	56–7	16–4	Women's College World Series (runner-up)
1992	Backus/Enquist	54–2	14–2	NCAA Champions
1993	Backus/Enquist	50–5	25–1	Women's College World Series (runner-up)
1994	Backus/Enquist	43–14	16–6	Women's College World Series (runner-up)
1995	Backus/Enquist	43–6	23–4	NCAA Champions (vacated by NCAA)
1996	Backus/Enquist	47–11	20–7	Women's College World Series (3rd place)
1997	Sue Enquist	49–14	21–7	Women's College World Series (runner-up)
1998	Sue Enquist	18–27	8–18	
1999	Sue Enquist	63–6	22–6	NCAA Champions
2000	Sue Enquist	46–12–1	14–7	Women's College World Series (runner-up)
2001	Sue Enquist	62–6	16–5	Women's College World Series (runner-up)
2002	Sue Enquist	55–9	18–3	Women's College World Series (5th place)
2003	Sue Enquist	54–7	17–4	NCAA Champions
2004	Sue Enquist	47–9	12–8	NCAA Champions
2005	Sue Enquist	40–20	11–10	Women's College World Series (runner-up)
2006	Sue Enquist	50–9	15–5	Women's College World Series (4th place)
2007	Kelly Inouye-Perez	37–18	12–9	NCAA Regional
2008	Kelly Inouye-Perez	51–9	17–4	Women's College World Series (5th place)
2009	Kelly Inouye-Perez	45–11	16–5	NCAA Super Regional
2010	Kelly Inouye-Perez	50–11	14–7	NCAA Champions
2011	Kelly Inouye-Perez	36–19	9–12	NCAA Regional
Pac-12
2012	Kelly Inouye-Perez	36–20	12–12	NCAA Regional
2013	Kelly Inouye-Perez	40–20	10–4	NCAA Regional
2014	Kelly Inouye-Perez	52–8	19–5	NCAA Super Regional
2015	Kelly Inouye-Perez	51–12	19–5	Women's College World Series (5th place)
2016	Kelly Inouye-Perez	40–16–1	16–5–1	Women's College World Series (8th place)
2017	Kelly Inouye-Perez	48–15	16–8	Women's College World Series (6th place)
2018	Kelly Inouye-Perez	55–5	20–4	Women's College World Series (3rd place)
2019	Kelly Inouye-Perez	56–6	20–4	NCAA Champions
2020	Kelly Inouye-Perez	25–1	0–0	Season cancelled due to COVID-19 pandemic
2021	Kelly Inouye-Perez	47–7	19–2	Women's College World Series (5th place)
2022	Kelly Inouye-Perez	51–10	19–5	Women's College World Series (4th place)
2023	Kelly Inouye-Perez	52–7	21–3	NCAA Regional
2024	Kelly Inouye-Perez	43–12	17–4	Women's College World Series (5th place)
Big Ten
2025	Kelly Inouye-Perez	55–13	17–5	Women's College World Series (6th place)
2026	Kelly Inouye-Perez	53–10	20–4	Women's College World Series (5th place)

=== NCAA Tournament seeding history ===
National seeding began in 2005. The UCLA Bruins have been a national seed in 17 of the 19 tournaments.

Years →	'05	'06	'07	'08	'09	'10	'12	'14	'15	'16	'17	'18	'19	'21	'22	'23	'24	'25
Seeds →	7	1	12	2	2	5	12	3	7	12	5	3	2	2	5	2	6	9

== Notable players ==
=== National awards ===
NFCA National Freshman of the Year

- Rachel Garcia (2017)

NFCA National Player of the Year

- Rachel Garcia (2018, 2021)

NFCA National Pitcher of the Year

- Rachel Garcia (2019)

Softball America Player of the Year

- Rachel Garcia (2019)

Softball America Pitcher of the Year

- Megan Faraimo (2020)

Softball America Freshman of the Year

- Maya Brady (2020)

USA Softball Collegiate Player of the Year

- Rachel Garcia (2018, 2019)

NFCA Catcher of the Year

- Stacey Nuveman (1999, 2001, 2002)

=== Conference awards ===
Pac-12 Player of the Year

- Lisa Longaker (1987, 1988, 1990)
- Lisa Fernandez (1991, 1992, 1993)
- Stacey Nuveman (1999, 2001, 2002)
- Natasha Watley (2003)
- Andrea Duran (2006)
- Megan Langenfeld (2010)
- Ally Carda (2014, 2015)
- Rachel Garcia (2018, 2019, 2021)
- Maya Brady (2023, 2024)

Pac-12 Pitcher of the Year

- Courtney Dale (1999)
- Keira Goerl (2003)
- Rachel Garcia (2019)
- Megan Faraimo (2022, 2023)

Pac-12 Defensive Player of the Year

- Briana Perez (2022)

Pac-12 Freshman of the Year

- Tanya Harding (1995)
- Julie Adams (1996)
- Stacey Nuveman (1997)
- Anjelica Selden (2005)
- Stephany LaRosa (2012)
- Rachel Garcia (2017)
- Aaliyah Jordan (2018)
- Megan Faraimo (2019)
- Jordan Woolery (2023)
- Kaitlyn Terry (2024)

Pac-12 Coach of the Year

- Sharron Backus (1990, 1992, 1993, 1995)
- Sue Enquist (1995, 1999, 2006)
- Kelly Inouye-Perez (2009, 2021, 2023, 2024)

Big Ten Player of the Year

- Jordan Woolery (2026)
