= Oregon State Beavers softball =

College softball team of Oregon State University

- 2023 Oregon State Beavers softball team
- Founded: 1975; 51 years ago
- University: Oregon State University
- Head coach: Laura Berg (11th season)
- Conference: Pac-12
- Location: Corvallis, Oregon, US
- Home stadium: Kelly Field (capacity: 750)
- Nickname: Beavers
- Colors: Orange and black

NCAA WCWS appearances
- 2006, 2022

AIAW WCWS appearances
- 1977, 1978, 1979

NCAA super regional appearances
- 2006, 2022

NCAA Tournament appearances
- 1999, 2000, 2001, 2002, 2003, 2004, 2005, 2006, 2007, 2012, 2013, 2016, 2017, 2018, 2022

Regular-season conference championships
- 2005

The Oregon State Beavers softball team represents Oregon State University in NCAA Division I college softball. The team participates in the Pac-12 Conference. The Beavers are currently led by head coach Laura Berg. The team plays their home games at Kelly Field, formerly known as Oregon State Softball Complex, located on the university's campus.

== History ==
=== Coaching history ===
Years	Coach	Record	%
1975–1976	Diane Thompson	23–13	.639
1977	Rayne Brooks	18–13–1	.578
1978–1980	Rita Emery	55–28–1	.661
1981–1985	Ellen Margolis	145–76–1	.655
1986–1988	Carol Browning	45–80	.360
1989–1994	Vickie Dugan	64–201	.242
1995–2012	Kirk Walker	594–491–3	.547
2013–present	Laura Berg	268-232–1	.536

Kirk Walker came out as gay to the Oregon State Beavers softball team while he was their coach in 2005, and while still the coach of that team, came out to the website Outsports in 2007; he was the first openly gay male coach in NCAA Division I history.

== Championships ==
=== Conference Championships ===
Season	Conference	Record	Head coach
2005	Pac-12 Conference	13–8	Kirk Walker

== Coaching staff ==
Name	Position coached	Consecutive season at Oregon State in current position
Laura Berg	Head coach	11th
Eric Leyba	Associate Head Coach	5th
Jamie Wiggins	Assistant coach	1st
Shelly Prochaska	Player Development	4th
Sarah Hoechlin	Director of Operations	2nd

== Notable players ==
=== Conference awards ===
Pac-12 Pitcher of the Year

- Brianne McGowan (2005)

Pac-12 Coach of the Year

- Kirk Walker (1999, 2005)
