= Mike Rappl =

American softball coach

Biographical details
- Education: Canisius

Coaching career (HC unless noted)

Basketball
- 1981–1986: Canisius (associate coach)
- 1986–1993: Canisius

Softball
- 1980–2014: Canisius

Head coaching record
- Overall: 831–526–2 (.612) (softball)
- Tournaments: 3–22 (.120) (softball)

Accomplishments and honors

Championships
- 13× MAAC regular season (1993–1996, 1997–1999, 2001, 2002, 2006–2008, 2010); 12× MAAC tournament (1993–1997, 2000, 2002, 2004, 2005, 2007–2009)

Awards
- 7× MAAC Softball Coach of the Year (1992–1995, 1998, 2001, 2008); MAAC Women's Basketball Coach of the Year (1992); Buffalo Sports Hall of Fame (2015)

Records
- Most MAAC wins by a coach in league history (253); Most Wins by a coach at Canisius (831); Most NCAA Tournament appearances by a MAAC coach (11)

Michael R. Rappl is an American former basketball and softball coach. From 1980 until 2014, Rappl was the head softball coach at Canisius College. While at Canisius, Rappl helped build the program from a club team into a perennial NCAA tournament team and is considered a legendary figure in Canisius athletics history.

== Coaching career ==
=== Softball ===
After graduating from Canisius in 1977, Rappl was tasked with building the school's softball program in 1980. After posting a 5–9 record in his first season as head coach, Rappl led the program to 22 consecutive winning seasons, spanning from 1981 until 2002. Rappl ultimately led the Golden Griffins to 27 winning seasons in 35 years, winning 831 career games.

Along the way, the Golden Griffins won the Metro Atlantic Athletic Conference (MAAC) regular season championship 13 times, as well as winning the MAAC tournament 12 times, both records. The team qualified for the NCAA Division I softball tournament 11 times. Rappl is one of two MAAC coaches to win a game in the NCAA tournament, the other being former Niagara coach Al Dirschberger.

While at Canisius, Rappl was named MAAC Coach of the Year a record seven times, winning the award each year from 1992 to 1995, 1998, 2001, and for the last time in 2008. His teams qualified for the NCAA tournament 11 times, doing so each year from 1994 to 1997, 2000, 2002, 2004, 2005, and each year from 2007 to 2009. Upon his retirement, Rappl was the most winningest head coach in any sport in MAAC history. He has since been passed in this distinction by former Siena baseball coach Tony Rossi.

=== Basketball ===
While serving as head coach of the Canisius softball team, Rappl also was the head coach of the women's basketball team from the 1986–1987 season until the 1992–1993 season. He finished his time as a basketball coach with a 93–94 record, and was named MAAC Coach of the Year for the 1991–1992 season.

== Head coaching record ==
Record table
Season	Team	Overall	Conference	Standing	Postseason
Canisius Golden Griffins (America East Conference) (1980–1989)
1980	Canisius	5–9			
1981	Canisius	9–4			
1982	Canisius	12–10			
1983	Canisius	12–8			
1984	Canisius	15–8			
1985	Canisius	28–9			
1986	Canisius	20–6–1			
1987	Canisius	17–8			
1988	Canisius	16–9			
1989	Canisius	20–9			
Canisius Golden Griffins (Metro Atlantic Athletic Conference) (1990–2014)
1990	Canisius	21–11–1		4th	
1991	Canisius	27–10	11–2	2nd	
1992	Canisius	22–7	6–0	2nd	
1993	Canisius	36–3	10–0	1st	
1994	Canisius	38–8	11–1	1st	NCAA Regionals
1995	Canisius	28–14	11–1	1st	NCAA Play-In
1996	Canisius	33–7	11–1	1st	NCAA Play-In
1997	Canisius	31–14	10–2	1st	NCAA Play-In
1998	Canisius	22–18	14–2	1st	
1999	Canisius	32–12	14–2	1st	
2000	Canisius	34–23	9–7	4th	NCAA Regionals
2001	Canisius	28–15	14–2	1st	
2002	Canisius	33–16	13–3	2nd	NCAA Regionals
2003	Canisius	15–31	6–10	8th	
2004	Canisius	23–30	9–7	3rd	NCAA Regionals
2005	Canisius	22–19	10–6	3rd	NCAA Regionals
2006	Canisius	28–23	13–3	1st	
2007	Canisius	27–21	12–4	1st	NCAA Regionals
2008	Canisius	39–14	15–1	1st	NCAA Regionals
2009	Canisius	26–25	9–7	4th	NCAA Regionals
2010	Canisius	34–19	13–3	1st	
2011	Canisius	20–21	7–9	6th	
2012	Canisius	20–30	11–5	3rd	
2013	Canisius	22–25	6–10	7th	
2014	Canisius	18–30	8–12	8th	
Total:		831–526–2 (.612)			
National champion Postseason invitational champion Conference regular season champion Conference regular season and conference tournament champion Division regular season champion Division regular season and conference tournament champion Conference tournament champion
