= Canisius Golden Griffins softball =

College softball team of Canisius University

Canisius Golden Griffins
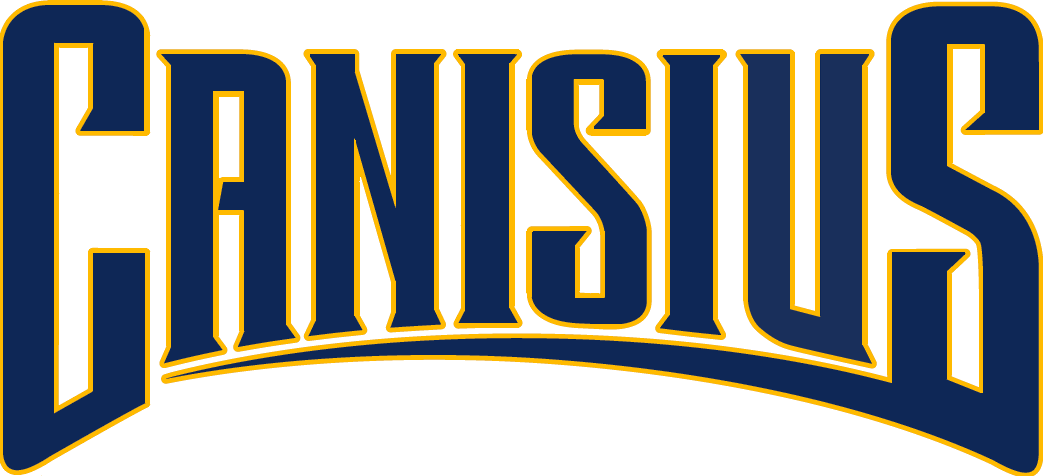
- University: Canisius University
- Head coach: Joe Gierlak (1st season)
- Conference: MAAC
- Location: Buffalo, New York, US
- Home stadium: Demske Sports Complex (capacity: 1,200)
- Nickname: Golden Griffins
- Colors: Blue and gold

NCAA Tournament appearances
- 1994, 1995, 1996, 1997, 2000, 2002, 2004, 2005, 2007, 2008, 2009, 2022

Conference tournament championships
- 1993, 1994, 1995, 1996, 1997, 2000, 2002, 2004, 2005, 2007, 2008, 2009, 2022

Regular-season conference championships
- 1993, 1994, 1995, 1996, 1997, 1998, 1999, 2001, 2002, 2006, 2007, 2008, 2010, 2015, 2022, 2023

The Canisius Golden Griffins softball team represents Canisius University for college softball in NCAA Division I. The team participates in the Metro Atlantic Athletic Conference (MAAC). The Golden Griffins are currently led by head coach Joe Gierlak. The team plays its home games at the Demske Sports Complex located on the college's campus.

== History ==
Since joining the Metro Atlantic Athletic Conference in 1990, the Golden Griffins have won 15 regular season titles to go along with 13 conference tournament championships in 19 championship game appearances, making them the most successful program in MAAC softball history. Under former head coach Mike Rappl, the team won the MAAC tournament championship, the regular season championship, or both in 17 of 18 seasons from 1993 to 2010, making the team one of the most dominant in the history of Western New York college sports. The team had only seven losing seasons in 34 years with Rappl as coach. Rappl was named MAAC Coach of the Year seven times, winning the award outright each year from 1993 to 1995, 1998, 2001, and 2008, and sharing the award with Linda Glum of the Iona Gaels in 1992.

Canisius has qualified for the NCAA Division I softball tournament a MAAC record 12 times, doing so each year from 1994 to 1997, 2000, 2002, 2004, 2005, each year from 2007 to 2009, and most recently in 2022. Overall, the program has a record of 5–25 in 30 appearances in the NCAA tournament, the most wins among any MAAC program. The only other program to win a game in the NCAA tournament were the 1998 Niagara Purple Eagles, who won two play-in games.

In the Golden Griffins first appearance in the NCAA tournament in 1994, Canisius faced off against UNC Greensboro in the qualifying round, winning the best-of-three playoff in three games. In doing so, they became the first MAAC team to win a game in the NCAA tournament. After defeating the Spartans, Canisius faced off against eventual NCAA champion Arizona and were defeated 7–0. In the losers bracket, they faced Rutgers, who they defeated 4-3 and advanced in the losers bracket. The Golden Griffins were eliminated from the tournament by Texas A&M, losing 9–0. While the program qualified for the play-in round of the tournament in 1995, 1996, and 1997, they failed to win a game and were eliminated, twice by UMass in 1995 and 1997, and Princeton in 1996. After the expansion of the NCAA tournament in 1999, the Golden Griffins automatically qualified for the 2000 as a result of winning the MAAC tournament. The team went on to face UCLA in their first game, losing 8–0 in five innings via mercy rule. In their first game in the losers bracket, Canisius defeated Bethune–Cookman by a score of 3–2 in extra innings. They were eliminated from the tournament after losing to Iowa by a score of 2–1 in a game that went to extra innings. Despite making the NCAA tournament in 2002, 2004, 2005, and 2007, Canisius failed to win a single game over the course of the tournaments and were eliminated. After losing to Arizona in the 2008 NCAA Division I softball tournament, the Golden Griffins snapped their tournament winless streak by defeating LIU Brooklyn by a score of 3–2. However, they were eliminated from the tournament in their next game, losing 5–1 to Hofstra. In the 2009 NCAA Division I softball tournament, the program's final NCAA appearance under Mike Rappl, the team was eliminated after losing games to Ohio State and Kentucky.

The Golden Griffins returned to the NCAA tournament for the first time in 13 years in 2022, the program's first appearance under coach Kim Griffin. The team was defeated in their first game against Florida, losing 10–1 in five innings. Canisius was eliminated from the tournament after losing 3–0 to Wisconsin. On May 9, 2025, Griffin stepped down as head coach to pursue other opportunities. Assistant coach Joe Gierlak was promoted to the head coaching position on June 30, 2025.

=== Coaching history ===
Years	Coach	Record	%
1980–2014	Mike Rappl	831–526–2	.612
2015–2025	Kim Griffin	241–254–1	.487
2026–present	Joe Gierlak	17–27	.386

== Roster ==
2026 Canisius Golden Griffins roster
Pitchers: 8 – Brooke Bodewes – Freshman; 23 – Liv Herrington – Junior; 28 – Olivia Manchester – Junior; 21 – Taylor McManus – Sophomore; 18 – Mikaila Obenrader – Sophomore; 12 – Mia Preuhs – Freshman; Catchers: 2 – Maddy Hans – Freshman; 3 – Michaela Sycalik – Freshman; 4 – Talia Yermian – Freshman	Infielders: 77 – Bailey Alatorre – Senior; 32 – Sofia Escoto – Senior; 25 – Rebecca Hai – Junior; 17 – Renee Hester – Freshman; 7 – Bella Martin – Sophomore; 9 – Avyree Sherman – Freshman; 26 – Grace Walker – Sophomore; Outfielders: 10 – Ella Johel – Junior; 1 – Mia Martin – Junior; 22 – Kylee Miller – Sophomore; 15 – Alyssa Onyeagwa – Junior; 6 – Abby Post – Freshman

== Season-by-season results ==
Record table
Season	Coach	Overall	Conference	Standing	Postseason
Canisius Golden Griffins (America East Conference) (1980–1989)
1980	Mike Rappl	5–9			
1981	Mike Rappl	9–4			
1982	Mike Rappl	12–10			
1983	Mike Rappl	12–8			
1984	Mike Rappl	15–8			
1985	Mike Rappl	28–9			
1986	Mike Rappl	20–6–1			
1987	Mike Rappl	17–8			
1988	Mike Rappl	16–9			
1989	Mike Rappl	20–9			
Canisius Golden Griffins (Metro Atlantic Athletic Conference) (1990–present)
1990	Mike Rappl	21–11–1		4th	
1991	Mike Rappl	27–10	11–2	2nd	
1992	Mike Rappl	22–7	6–0	2nd	
1993	Mike Rappl	36–3	10–0	1st	
1994	Mike Rappl	38–8	11–1	1st	NCAA Regionals
1995	Mike Rappl	28–14	11–1	1st	NCAA Play-In
1996	Mike Rappl	33–7	11–1	1st	NCAA Play-In
1997	Mike Rappl	31–14	10–2	1st	NCAA Play-In
1998	Mike Rappl	22–18	14–2	1st	
1999	Mike Rappl	32–12	14–2	1st	
2000	Mike Rappl	34–23	9–7	4th	NCAA Regionals
2001	Mike Rappl	28–15	14–2	1st	
2002	Mike Rappl	33–16	13–3	2nd	NCAA Regionals
2003	Mike Rappl	15–31	6–10	8th	
2004	Mike Rappl	23–30	9–7	3rd	NCAA Regionals
2005	Mike Rappl	22–19	10–6	3rd	NCAA Regionals
2006	Mike Rappl	28–23	13–3	1st	
2007	Mike Rappl	27–21	12–4	1st	NCAA Regionals
2008	Mike Rappl	39–14	15–1	1st	NCAA Regionals
2009	Mike Rappl	26–25	9–7	4th	NCAA Regionals
2010	Mike Rappl	34–19	13–3	1st	
2011	Mike Rappl	20–21	7–9	6th	
2012	Mike Rappl	20–30	11–5	3rd	
2013	Mike Rappl	22–25	6–10	7th	
2014	Mike Rappl	18–30	8–12	8th	
2015	Kim Griffin	26–19	15–5	T–1st	
2016	Kim Griffin	23–32	13–7	4th	
2017	Kim Griffin	21–32	9–11	9th	
2018	Kim Griffin	12–35	8–12	10th	
2019	Kim Griffin	14–31	8–12	9th	
2020	Kim Griffin	8–9	0–0	N/A	Season cut short due to COVID-19 pandemic
2021	Kim Griffin	26–14	22–11	2nd	
2022	Kim Griffin	32–18	16–4	1st	NCAA Regionals
2023	Kim Griffin	30–16–1	17–3	1st	
2024	Kim Griffin	23–22	14–9	4th	
2025	Kim Griffin	26–26	15–10	T–5th	
2026	Joe Gierlak	17–27	11–15	9th	
Total:		1,102–819–3 (.574)			
National champion Postseason invitational champion Conference regular season champion Conference regular season and conference tournament champion Division regular season champion Division regular season and conference tournament champion Conference tournament champion

== See also ==
- List of NCAA Division I softball programs
