= 1996 NCAA Division I softball rankings =

1996 NCAA Division I softball season
- Preseason No. 1: UCLA
- Defending Champions: UCLA

Tournament
- Most conference bids: Pac-10, Big 12 (4)

Women's College World Series
- Champions: Arizona (4th title)
- Runners-up: Washington (1st WCWS Appearance)
- Winning Coach: Mike Candrea (4th title)
- WCWS MOP: Jenny Dalton (Arizona)

Seasons
- ← 1995 1997 →

The following human polls make up the 1996 NCAA Division I women's softball rankings. The NFCA/USA Today Poll is voted on by a panel of 32 Division I softball coaches and ranks to top 25 teams nationally.

== Legend ==
	Increase in ranking
	Decrease in ranking
	Not ranked previous week
Italics	Number of first place votes
(#–#)	Win–loss record
т	Tied with team above or below also with this symbol

== NFCA/USA Today ==
	Week 1 Feb 28	Week 2 Mar 6	Week 3 Mar 13	Week 4 Mar 20	Week 5 Mar 27	Week 6 Apr 2	Week 7 Apr 10	Week 8 Apr 17	Week 9 Apr 24	Week 10 May 1	Week 11 May 7	Week 12 May 28	
1.	UCLA (14)	UCLA (9) (12–2)	UCLA (13) (20–2)	Arizona (8) (21–2)	Arizona (16) (27–3)	Arizona (19) (30–4)	Arizona (20) (34–4)	Arizona (20) (38–4)	Washington (19) (40–7)	Washington (20) (44–7)	Washington (20) (49–7)	Arizona (20) (58–9)	1.
2.	Arizona (3)	Washington (6) (16–1)	Arizona (5) (21–2)	Washington (7) (23–1)	UCLA (4) (25–3)	Washington (1) (33–6)	Washington (34–7)	Washington (38–7)	Arizona (1) (39–7)	Arizona (43–9)	Arizona (47–9)	Washington (59–9)	2.
3.	Fresno State	Arizona (5) (14–2)	Washington (2) (16–1)	UCLA (5) (21–3)	Washington (28–5)	UCLA (27–5)	UCLA (28–6)	Fresno State (36–6)	Fresno State (39–7)	Fresno State (43–7)	Fresno State (47–9)	UCLA (47–11)	3.
4.	Washington (2)	Fresno State (4–2)	Fresno State (10–3)	Fresno State (15–4)	Cal State Northridge (26–6)	Fresno State (26–6)	Fresno State (30–6)	UCLA (28–8)	UCLA (30–8)	UCLA (36–8)	UCLA (40–8)	Iowa (49–19)	4.
5.	Cal State Fullerton	Cal State Northridge (13–4)	Cal State Fullerton (16–6)	Cal State Northridge (21–4)	Cal State Fullerton (25–10)	Cal State Northridge (26–6)	Cal State Northridge (28–8)	Cal State Northridge (30–9)	Southwestern Louisiana (39–7)	Southwestern Louisiana (42–8)	Southwestern Louisiana (42–8)	Southwestern Louisiana (46–10)	5.
6.	Southwestern Louisiana (1)	Cal State Fullerton (13–5)	Cal State Northridge (15–4)	UNLV (19–6)	Fresno State (18–6)	UNLV (24–9)	Southwestern Louisiana (31–7)	Southwestern Louisiana (35–7)	Cal State Northridge (34–11)	Cal State Northridge (38–12)	Cal State Northridge (41–13)	California (41–23)	6.
7.	UNLV	UNLV (12–5)	UNLV (17–6)	Cal State Fullerton (21–10)	UNLV (22–9)	South Carolina (26–5)	Cal State Fullerton (32–15)	South Carolina (32–8)	South Carolina (35–9)	South Carolina (35–9)	Michigan (43–12)	Michigan (51–14)	7.
8.	Cal State Northridge	South Carolina (12–1)	South Carolina (18–2)	South Carolina (20–2)	South Carolina (22–5)	Cal State Fullerton (28–13)	South Carolina (26–7)	Michigan (34–10)	Michigan (38–11)	UNLV (35–18)	South Carolina (36–10)	Fresno State (51–11)	8.
9.	Oklahoma	Nebraska (12–3)	Florida State (22–9)	Southwestern Louisiana (22–5)	Southwestern Louisiana (25–7)	Southwestern Louisiana (27–7)	UNLV (25–14)	Cal State Fullerton (34–17)	Cal State Fullerton (37–20)	Michigan (41–11)	Oklahoma (45–18)	Cal State Fullerton (40–27)	9.
10.	California	Oklahoma (15–7)	Southwestern Louisiana (15–4)	Michigan (16–7)	California (22–10)	Michigan (23–9)	Michigan (28–9)	Oklahoma (34–16)	UNLV (33–18)	Oklahoma (42–18)	UNLV (36–21)	South Carolina (38–13)	10.
11.	Nebraska	California (7–4)	Nebraska (12–3)	California (16–7)	Michigan (21–8)	California (24–12)	Oklahoma (30–15)	UNLV (30–17)	Oklahoma (38–17)	California (34–18)	California (36–20)	Cal State Northridge (43–16)	11.
12.	Michigan	Southwestern Louisiana (8–4)	Texas A&M (20–6)	Oklahoma (22–10)	Oklahoma (24–13)	Texas A&M (23–7)	California (27–15)	California (29–17)	California (31–17)	Cal State Fullerton (37–24)	South Florida (40–10)	Oklahoma (50–20)	12.
13.	Florida State	Florida State (13–7)	California (10–5)	Texas A&M (20–6)	Texas A&M (22–6)	Oklahoma (26–14)	Minnesota (27–6)	Minnesota (31–7)	Iowa (36–12)	Iowa (40–13)	Minnesota (42–14)	Florida State (47–21)	13.
14.	South Carolina т	Michigan (4–3)	Oklahoma (18–10)	Florida State (25–13)	Florida State (30–14)	Florida State (32–14)	Florida State (37–14)	Nebraska (29–13)	Nebraska (31–15)	Minnesota (40–10)	Iowa (43–15)	Princeton (47–8–1)	14.
15.	Texas A&M т	Minnesota (18–3)	Michigan (9–6)	Nebraska (16–6)	Minnesota (22–6)	Minnesota (24–6)	Iowa (27–10)	Iowa (30–12)	Minnesota (34–9)	South Florida (39–9)	Cal State Fullerton (39–26)	Oklahoma State (37–20)	15.
16.	Minnesota	Texas A&M (15–5)	Minnesota (18–3)	Iowa (12–4)	Iowa (19–8)	Iowa (22–10)	Texas A&M (25–10)	South Florida (38–9)	Texas A&M (33–12)	Oklahoma State (33–15)	Florida State (48–19)	South Florida (41–12)	16.
17.	Kansas	Indiana (7–4)	Indiana (12–6)	Minnesota (18–3)	Nebraska (22–11)	Nebraska (22–11)	South Florida (36–9)	Florida State (41–17)	Florida State (44–17)	Florida State (44–17)	Oklahoma State (33–15)	Nebraska (41–23)	17.
18.	Cal Poly	UIC (8–2)	Hawaii (15–6)	South Florida (25–7)	South Florida (30–9)	South Florida (32–9)	Nebraska (25–12)	Texas A&M (28–12)	South Florida (39–9)	Nebraska (35–18)	Nebraska (37–18)	UNLV (36–23)	18.
19.	Sacramento State	Hawaii (15–6)	Iowa (8–4)	Indiana (19–9)	Hawaii (22–11)	Arizona State (21–12)	UIC (21–9)	Indiana (27–15)	Notre Dame (40–11)	Notre Dame (45–12)	Long Beach State (34–17)	Minnesota (44–18)	19.
20.	UIC	Pacific (7–1)	UIC (11–5)	Hawaii (20–11)	Arizona State (21–10)	Hawaii (26–15)	Arizona State (22–15)	UIC (29–9)	Indiana (30–17)	Texas A&M (35–15)	Notre Dame (48–14)	Long Beach State (36–22)	20.
21.	Oklahoma State т	Oklahoma State (6–4)	Pacific (9–3)	UIC (16–9)	Indiana (19–11)	UIC (17–9)	Notre Dame (29–10)	Notre Dame (34–11)	UIC (32–10)	UIC (37–11)	Texas A&M (38–18)	Texas A&M (39–21)	21.
22.	Missouri т	Kansas (11–5)	South Florida (17–3)	Arizona State (15–9)	UIC (16–9)	Indiana (19–13)	Indiana (23–14)	Long Beach State (27–16)	Oklahoma State (28–15)	Indiana (34–18)	UIC (39–11)	Nicholls State (46–19–1)	22.
23.	Hawaii	Sacramento State (9–9)	New Mexico State (17–13)	Utah (13–9)	Sacramento State (20–13)	Sacramento State (22–15)	Sacramento State (23–18)	Oklahoma State (25–13)	Sacramento State (29–19)	Long Beach State (31–16)	Indiana (36–19)	Indiana (37–24)	23.
24.	Iowa	Cal Poly (9–4)	Notre Dame (9–8)	Pacific (11–6)	Cal Poly (19–9)	Notre Dame (22–10)	Hawaii (27–18)	Arizona State (34–19)	Long Beach State (27–16)	Princeton (38–6–1)	Princeton (38–6–1)	Notre Dame (48–16)	24.
25.	UTSA	Utah (11–7)	Utah (11–7)	New Mexico State (22–16)	New Mexico State (23–17)	Oklahoma State (18–11)	Long Beach State (23–16)	Sacramento State (26–19)	UMass (30–10–1)	Sacramento State (30–22)	Hawaii (36–25)	Boston University (35–10)	25.
	Week 1 Feb 28	Week 2 Mar 6	Week 3 Mar 13	Week 4 Mar 20	Week 5 Mar 27	Week 6 Apr 2	Week 7 Apr 10	Week 8 Apr 17	Week 9 Apr 24	Week 10 May 1	Week 11 May 7	Week 12 May 28	
		Dropped: No. 22 Missouri; No. 24 Iowa; No. 25 UTSA	Dropped: No. 21 Oklahoma State; No. 21 Kansas; No. 23 Sacramento State; No. 24 Cal Poly	Dropped: No. 24 Notre Dame	Dropped: No. 23 Utah; No. 24 Pacific	Dropped: No. 14 Cal Poly; No. 25 New Mexico State	Dropped: No. 25 Oklahoma State	Dropped: No. 24 Hawaii	Dropped: No. 24 Arizona State	Dropped: No. 25 UMass	Dropped: No. 25 Cal State Sacramento	Dropped: No. 22 UIC; No. 25 Hawaii	
