= 1995 Big Ten softball tournament =

College softball tournament in Michigan

- Teams: 4
- Format: Double-elimination
- Finals site: Alumni Field; Ann Arbor, Michigan
- Champions: Michigan (1st title)
- Runner-up: Iowa (1st title game)
- Winning coach: Carol Hutchins (1st title)

1995 Big Ten Conference softball standings
	Conf.						Overall
Team	W		L		T	PCT	W		L		T	PCT
No. 9 Michigan ‍†‍‡‍^{y}	22	–	6	–	0	.786	50	–	12	–	0	.806
Northwestern ‍‍‍	19	–	9	–	0	.679	38	–	19	–	0	.667
No. 6 Iowa ‍‍‍^{y}	18	–	10	–	0	.643	41	–	26	–	1	.610
Minnesota ‍‍‍	15	–	13	–	0	.536	27	–	29	–	0	.482
Indiana ‍‍‍	14	–	14	–	0	.500	27	–	28	–	0	.491
Ohio State ‍‍‍	11	–	17	–	0	.393	33	–	30	–	0	.524
Penn State ‍‍‍	10	–	18	–	0	.357	23	–	26	–	0	.469
Michigan State ‍‍‍	9	–	19	–	0	.321	24	–	29	–	0	.453
Purdue ‍‍‍	8	–	20	–	0	.286	23	–	31	–	0	.426
† – Conference champion ‡ – Tournament champion y – Invited to the NCAA tournament As of May 1995; Rankings from NFCA/USA Today

The 1995 Big Ten softball tournament was held at Alumni Field on the campus of the University of Michigan in Ann Arbor, Michigan. It was the second-ever Big Ten softball tournament, and the first since 1982. As the tournament winner, Michigan earned the Big Ten Conference's automatic bid to the 1995 NCAA Division I softball tournament. This was the first of four consecutive Big Ten softball tournaments that Michigan won from 1995 to 1998.

== Format and seeding ==
The 1995 tournament was a four team double-elimination tournament. The top four teams based on conference regular season winning percentage earned invites to the tournament.

== Tournament ==
First round
1	Michigan	5
4	Minnesota	3
3	Iowa	7
2	Northwestern	5
4	Minnesota	2
2	Northwestern	3

Semi-finals
1	Michigan	5
3	Iowa	1
2	Northwestern	0
3	Iowa	1

Finals
1	Michigan	3	—
3	Iowa	2	—
