= 1996 UCLA Bruins softball team =

American college softball season

1996 UCLA Bruins softball

NCAA Regional No. 7 champion

Women's College World Series, 2–2
- Conference: Pacific-10 Conference
- Record: 47–11 (20–7 Pac-10)
- Head coach: Sharron Backus (22nd season) & Sue Enquist (8th season)
- Home stadium: Easton Stadium

1996 Pacific-10 Conference softball standings
	Conf.				Overall
Team	W		L	PCT	W		L	PCT
No. 2 Washington ‍†‍‍^{y}	23	–	4	.852	59	–	9	.868
No. 1 Arizona ‍‍‍^{y}	23	–	5	.821	58	–	9	.866
No. 3 UCLA ‍‍‍^{y}	20	–	7	.741	47	–	11	.810
No. 6 California ‍‍‍^{y}	14	–	12	.538	41	–	23	.641
Arizona State ‍‍‍	10	–	18	.357	34	–	27	.557
Stanford ‍‍‍	7	–	19	.269	24	–	29	.453
Oregon ‍‍‍	5	–	18	.217	21	–	30	.412
Oregon State ‍‍‍	3	–	22	.120	15	–	35	.300
† – Conference champion y – Invited to the NCAA tournament As of May 31, 1996; Rankings from NFCA/USA Today

The 1996 UCLA Bruins softball team represented the University of California, Los Angeles in the 1996 NCAA Division I softball season. The Bruins were coached by Sharron Backus, who led her twenty-second season and Sue Enquist, in her eighth season, in an uncommonly used co-head coach system. The Bruins played their home games at Easton Stadium and finished with a record of 47–11. They competed in the Pacific-10 Conference, where they finished thirdd with a 20–7 record.

The Bruins were invited to the 1996 NCAA Division I softball tournament, where they won the Regional to advance to the Women's College World Series. They finished tied for third place with wins against Michigan and Southwestern Louisiana and losses to eventual champion Arizona and runner-up Washington.

== Personnel ==
=== Roster ===
1996 UCLA Bruins roster
Pitchers: 4 - Kaci Clark - Senior; 10 - B'Ann Burns - Junior; Catchers: 5 - Sandra Burkey - Junior; 32 - Julie Marshall - Freshman	Infielders: 1 - Nicole Odom - Junior; 8 - Kelly Howard - Senior; 14 - Alleah Poulson - Junior; 18 - Julie Adams - Freshman; 19 - Kim Wuest - Sophomore; Utility: 13 - Lesley Feldman - Freshman; 22 - Nikki Barbieri - Junior	Outfielders: 3 - Laurie Fritz - Sophomore; 6 - Nicole Ochoa - Junior; 11 - Ginny Mike-Mitchell - Senior; 44 - Christie Ambrosi - Freshman

=== Coaches ===
1996 UCLA Bruins softball coaching staff
- Sharron Backus - co-Head coach - 22nd season
- Sue Enquist - co-Head coach - 8th season
- Kelly Inouye - Assistant Coach - 3rd season
- Lisa Fernandez - Assistant Coach - 1st season

== Schedule ==
Legend
	UCLA win
	UCLA loss
*	Non-Conference game

1996 UCLA Bruins softball game log
Regular season

January/February
Date	Opponent	Rank	Site/stadium	Score	Overall record	Pac-10 record
Jan 27	Loyola Marymount*	No. 1	Easton Stadium • Los Angeles, CA	W 9–0	1–0	
Jan 27	Loyola Marymount*	No. 1	Easton Stadium • Los Angeles, CA	W 5–4	2–0	
Feb 4	Stanford	No. 1	Easton Stadium • Los Angeles, CA	W 2–1	3–0	1–0
Feb 4	Stanford	No. 1	Easton Stadium • Los Angeles, CA	W 11–1 ^{(5)}	4–0	2–0
Feb 10	No. 10 California	No. 1	Easton Stadium • Los Angeles, CA	W 7–0	5–0	3–0
Feb 10	No. 10 California	No. 1	Easton Stadium • Los Angeles, CA	L 2–5	5–1	3–1
Feb 13	at UC Santa Barbara*	No. 1	Caesar Uyesaka Stadium • Santa Barbara, CA	W 1–0	6–1	
Feb 13	at UC Santa Barbara*	No. 1	Caesar Uyesaka Stadium • Santa Barbara, CA	W 12–0 ^{(5)}	7–1	
Feb 24	at No. 3 Fresno State*	No. 1	Bulldog Diamond • Fresno, CA	W 4–1	8–1	
Feb 24	at No. 3 Fresno State*	No. 1	Bulldog Diamond • Fresno, CA	L 4–5	8–2	

March
Date	Opponent	Rank	Site/stadium	Score	Overall record	Pac-10 record
Mar 2	Ohio State*	No. 1	Easton Stadium • Los Angeles, CA (Reebok Invitational)	W 9–0 ^{(5)}	9–2	
Mar 2	Ohio State*	No. 1	Easton Stadium • Los Angeles, CA (Reebok Invitational)	W 13–0 ^{(5)}	10–2	
Mar 3	Oregon State*	No. 1	Easton Stadium • Los Angeles, CA (Reebok Invitational)	W 10–2 ^{(6)}	11–2	
Mar 3	Oregon State*	No. 1	Easton Stadium • Los Angeles, CA (Reebok Invitational)	W 11–3 ^{(5)}	12–2	
Mar 8	vs Michigan State*	No. 1	USF Softball Stadium • Tampa, FL (Speedline/USF Softball Classic)	W 6–3	13–2	
Mar 8	vs Marshall*	No. 1	USF Softball Stadium • Tampa, FL (Speedline/USF Softball Classic)	W 10–1 ^{(5)}	14–2	
Mar 8	at South Florida*	No. 1	USF Softball Stadium • Tampa, FL (Speedline/USF Softball Classic)	W 8–0 ^{(5)}	15–2	
Mar 9	vs Hofstra*	No. 1	USF Softball Stadium • Tampa, FL (Speedline/USF Softball Classic)	W 9–0 ^{(5)}	16–2	
Mar 9	vs Indiana State*	No. 1	USF Softball Stadium • Tampa, FL (Speedline/USF Softball Classic)	W 9–0 ^{(5)}	17–2	
Mar 10	vs Western Illinois*	No. 1	USF Softball Stadium • Tampa, FL (Speedline/USF Softball Classic)	W 5–1	18–2	
Mar 10	vs No. 13 Florida State*	No. 1	USF Softball Stadium • Tampa, FL (Speedline/USF Softball Classic)	W 4–0	19–2	
Mar 10	vs Iowa*	No. 1	USF Softball Stadium • Tampa, FL (Speedline/USF Softball Classic)	W 2–1	20–2	
Mar 14	Arizona State	No. 1	Easton Stadium • Los Angeles, CA	L 3–4	20–3	4–1
Mar 14	Arizona State	No. 1	Easton Stadium • Los Angeles, CA	W 3–0	21–3	5–1
Mar 23	Oregon	No. 3	Easton Stadium • Los Angeles, CA	W 4–2	22–3	6–1
Mar 23	Oregon	No. 3	Easton Stadium • Los Angeles, CA	W 4–2	23–3	7–1
Mar 24	San Diego State*	No. 3	Easton Stadium • Los Angeles, CA	W 3–1	24–3	
Mar 24	San Diego State*	No. 3	Easton Stadium • Los Angeles, CA	W 5–2	25–3	
Mar 26	Oregon State	No. 3	Easton Stadium • Los Angeles, CA	W 8–0	26–3	8–1
Mar 26	Oregon State	No. 3	Easton Stadium • Los Angeles, CA	W 10–1	27–3	9–1
Mar 29	at No. 1 Arizona	No. 2	Rita Hillenbrand Memorial Stadium • Tucson, AZ	L 4–5	27–4	9–2
Mar 29	at No. 1 Arizona	No. 2	Rita Hillenbrand Memorial Stadium • Tucson, AZ	L 0–5	27–5	9–3

April
Date	Opponent	Rank	Site/stadium	Score	Overall record	Pac-10 record
Apr 6	No. 2 Washington	No. 3	Easton Stadium • Los Angeles, CA	L 1–4	27–6	9–4
Apr 6	No. 2 Washington	No. 3	Easton Stadium • Los Angeles, CA	W 4–3 ^{(8)}	28–6	10–4
Apr 13	No. 1 Arizona	No. 3	Easton Stadium • Los Angeles, CA	L 3–5	28–7	10–5
Apr 13	No. 1 Arizona	No. 3	Easton Stadium • Los Angeles, CA	L 1–5	28–8	10–6
Apr 20	at No. 24 Arizona State	No. 4	Sun Devil Club Stadium • Tempe, AZ	W 5–0	29–8	11–6
Apr 20	at No. 24 Arizona State	No. 4	Sun Devil Club Stadium • Tempe, AZ	W 16–3	30–8	12–6
Apr 23	at Santa Clara*	No. 4	Santa Clara, CA	W 1–0 ^{(8)}	31–8	
Apr 23	at Santa Clara*	No. 4	Santa Clara, CA	W 4–2	32–8	
Apr 27	at Oregon State	No. 4	Corvallis, OR	W 3–0	33–8	13–6
Apr 27	at Oregon State	No. 4	Corvallis, OR	W 10–0 ^{(6)}	34–8	14–6
Apr 28	at Oregon	No. 4	Howe Field • Eugene, OR	W 8–1	35–8	15–6
Apr 28	at Oregon	No. 4	Howe Field • Eugene, OR	W 9–5	36–8	16–6

May
Date	Opponent	Rank	Site/stadium	Score	Overall record	Pac-10 record
May 3	at Stanford	No. 4	Stanford, CA	W 4–2 ^{(10)}	37–8	17–6
May 3	at Stanford	No. 4	Stanford, CA	W 7–2	38–8	18–6
May 4	at No. 11 California	No. 4	Levine-Fricke Field • Berkeley, CA	W 2–0	39–8	19–6
May 4	at No. 11 California	No. 4	Levine-Fricke Field • Berkeley, CA	W 8–3	40–8	20–6
May 12	at No. 1 Washington	No. 4	Husky Softball Stadium • Seattle, WA	W 8–5	41–8	21–6

Postseason

NCAA Regional No. 7
Date	Opponent	Rank	Site/stadium	Score	Overall record	NCAAT record
May 17	No. 15 Cal State Fullerton	No. 4	Anderson Family Field • Fullerton, CA	L 1–5	41–9	0–1
May 18	Southwest Missouri State	No. 4	Anderson Family Field • Fullerton, CA	W 8–2	42–9	1–1
May 18	No. 6 Cal State Northridge	No. 4	Anderson Family Field • Fullerton, CA	W 7–5	43–9	2–1
May 19	No. 15 Cal State Fullerton	No. 4	Anderson Family Field • Fullerton, CA	W 14–1 ^{(5)}	44–9	3–1
May 19	No. 15 Cal State Fullerton	No. 4	Anderson Family Field • Fullerton, CA	W 7–2	45–9	4–1

NCAA Women's College World Series
Date	Opponent	Rank (Seed)	Site/stadium	Score	Overall record	WCWS Record
May 23	No. 7 (6) Michigan	No. 4 (3)	Golden Park • Columbus, GA	W 2–0	46–9	1–0
May 24	No. 2 (2) Arizona	No. 4 (3)	Golden Park • Columbus, GA	L 0–4	46–10	1–1
May 25	No. 5 (6) Southwestern Louisiana	No. 4 (3)	Golden Park • Columbus, GA	W 3–2	47–10	2–1
May 26	No. 1 (1) Washington	No. 4 (3)	Golden Park • Columbus, GA	L 2–8	47–11	2–2

== Ranking movements ==
Ranking movements Legend: ██ Increase in ranking ██ Decrease in ranking
	Week											
Poll	1	2	3	4	5	6	7	8	9	10	11	Final
NFCA/USA Today	1	1	1	3	2	3	3	4	4	4	4	3
