= 1996 Washington Huskies softball team =

American college softball season

2018 Washington Huskies softball

Pac-10 champion NCAA Regional No. 8 champion

Women's College World Series, runner-up
- Conference: Pacific-10 Conference
- Record: 59–9 (23–4 Pac-10)
- Head coach: Teresa Wilson (4th season)
- Home stadium: Husky Softball Stadium

1996 Pacific-10 Conference softball standings
	Conf.				Overall
Team	W		L	PCT	W		L	PCT
No. 2 Washington ‍†‍‍^{y}	23	–	4	.852	59	–	9	.868
No. 1 Arizona ‍‍‍^{y}	23	–	5	.821	58	–	9	.866
No. 3 UCLA ‍‍‍^{y}	20	–	7	.741	47	–	11	.810
No. 6 California ‍‍‍^{y}	14	–	12	.538	41	–	23	.641
Arizona State ‍‍‍	10	–	18	.357	34	–	27	.557
Stanford ‍‍‍	7	–	19	.269	24	–	29	.453
Oregon ‍‍‍	5	–	18	.217	21	–	30	.412
Oregon State ‍‍‍	3	–	22	.120	15	–	35	.300
† – Conference champion y – Invited to the NCAA tournament As of May 31, 1996; Rankings from NFCA/USA Today

The 1996 Washington Huskies softball team represented the University of Washington in the 1996 NCAA Division I softball season. The Huskies were coached by Teresa Wilson, who led her fourth season. The Huskies finished with a record of 59–9, and won the Pacific-10 Conference with a 23–4 record.

The Huskies were invited to the 1996 NCAA Division I Softball Tournament, where they swept the NCAA Regional No. 8 and then completed a run to the title game of the Women's College World Series where they fell to champion Arizona.

== Personnel ==
=== Roster ===
1996 Washington Huskies roster
Pitchers: 3 - Eve Gaw - Sophomore; 18 - Stephanie Burns - Senior; 19 - Heather Meyer - Senior; Catchers: 11 - Jeanine Giordano - Freshman; 14 - Jennifer Cline - Senior	Infielders: 6 - Becky Newbry - Freshman; 7 - Sara Pickering - Junior; 12 - Tami Storseth - Senior; 13 - Michelle Church - Senior; 15 - Jamie Nyblod - Freshman; 17 - Monika Ota - Freshman; 21 - Dana Schellenger - Freshman; 22 - Heather Tarr - Junior; 44 - Leanne Rosser - Junior	Outfielders: 10 - Mindy Williams - Senior; 16 - Marie Smith - Freshman; 20 - Shelley Brown - Junior; 24 - Rochelle Rahal - Junior; 28 - Leah Francis - Sophomore; Utility: 9 - Allison Mick - Senior

=== Coaches ===
2018 Washington Huskies softball coaching staff
- Teresa Wilson - Head coach - 4th season
- John Rittman - Assistant coach - 3rd season
- Katie Wiese - Graduate assistant coach - 1st season

== Schedule ==
Legend
	Washington win
	Washington loss
*	Non-Conference game

1996 Washington Huskies softball game log
Regular season

February
Date	Opponent	Rank	Site/stadium	Score	Overall record	Pac-10 record
Feb 16	vs Florida State*		Sun Devil Club Stadium • Tempe, AZ (Kajikawa Classic)	W 13–6	1–0	
Feb 16	vs Ohio State*		Sun Devil Club Stadium • Tempe, AZ (Kajikawa Classic)	W 17–4	2–0	
Feb 16	vs San Diego State*		Sun Devil Club Stadium • Tempe, AZ (Kajikawa Classic)	W 3–2	3–0	
Feb 17	vs Utah State*		Sun Devil Club Stadium • Tempe, AZ (Kajikawa Classic)	W 12–1	4–0	
Feb 17	vs Purdue*		Sun Devil Club Stadium • Tempe, AZ (Kajikawa Classic)	W 9–4	5–0	
Feb 18	vs UNLV*		Sun Devil Club Stadium • Tempe, AZ (Kajikawa Classic)	W 4–0	6–0	
Feb 23	vs New Mexico State*		Rita Hillenbrand Memorial Stadium • Tucson, AZ (Arizona Classic)	W 6–1	7–0	
Feb 23	vs Ohio State*		Rita Hillenbrand Memorial Stadium • Tucson, AZ (Arizona Classic)	W 6–3	8–0	
Feb 24	vs New Mexico State*		Rita Hillenbrand Memorial Stadium • Tucson, AZ (Arizona Classic)	W 5–2	9–0	
Feb 24	at No. 2 Arizona*	No. 4	Rita Hillenbrand Memorial Stadium • Tucson, AZ (Arizona Classic)	L 1–4	9–1	
Feb 25	vs Ohio State*		Rita Hillenbrand Memorial Stadium • Tucson, AZ (Arizona Classic)	W 3–2	10–1	

March
Date	Opponent	Rank	Site/stadium	Score	Overall record	Pac-10 record
Mar 1	vs No. 13 Florida State*	No. 4	Golden Park • Columbus, GA (NFCA Leadoff Classic)	W 3–1	11–1	
Mar 1	vs Long Beach State*	No. 4	Golden Park • Columbus, GA (NFCA Leadoff Classic)	W 4–0	12–1	
Mar 2	vs UMass*	No. 4	Golden Park • Columbus, GA (NFCA Leadoff Classic)	W 6–1	13–1	
Mar 2	vs Notre Dame*	No. 4	Golden Park • Columbus, GA (NFCA Leadoff Classic)	W 7–1	14–1	
Mar 3	vs No. 14 South Carolina*	No. 4	Golden Park • Columbus, GA (NFCA Leadoff Classic)	W 4–1	15–1	
Mar 3	vs Indiana*	No. 4	Golden Park • Columbus, GA (NFCA Leadoff Classic)	W 10–0	16–1	
Mar 15	vs Northern Illinois*	No. 3	Twin Creeks Sports Complex • Sunnyvale, CA (National Invitational Softball Tournament)	W 8–4	17–1	
Mar 15	vs Pacific*	No. 3	Twin Creeks Sports Complex • Sunnyvale, CA (National Invitational Tournament)	W 13–3	18–1	
Mar 15	vs Saint Mary's*	No. 3	Twin Creeks Sports Complex • Sunnyvale, CA (National Invitational Tournament)	W 19–0	19–1	
Mar 16	vs Colorado State*	No. 3	Twin Creeks Sports Complex • Sunnyvale, CA (National Invitational Tournament)	W 9–2	20–1	
Mar 16	vs California*	No. 3	Twin Creeks Sports Complex • Sunnyvale, CA (National Invitational Tournament)	W 7–2	21–1	
Mar 16	vs Northern Illinois*	No. 3	Twin Creeks Sports Complex • Sunnyvale, CA (National Invitational Tournament)	W 12–4	22–1	
Mar 17	vs Colorado State*	No. 3	Twin Creeks Sports Complex • Sunnyvale, CA (National Invitational Tournament)	W 2–0	23–1	
Mar 19	at California	No. 3	Levine-Fricke Field • Berkeley, CA	W 5–0	24–1	1–0
Mar 19	at California	No. 3	Levine-Fricke Field • Berkeley, CA	L 0–1	24–2	1–1
Mar 21	vs No. 9 Southwestern Louisiana*	No. 2	Titan Softball Complex • Fullerton, CA (Pony/Kia Klassic)	L 1–4	24–3	
Mar 21	vs Georgia State*	No. 2	Titan Softball Complex • Fullerton, CA (Pony/Kia Klassic)	W 7–1	25–3	
Mar 22	vs No. 5 Cal State Northridge*	No. 2	Titan Softball Complex • Fullerton, CA (Pony/Kia Klassic)	L 1–2	25–4	
Mar 23	vs DePaul*	No. 2	Titan Softball Complex • Fullerton, CA (Pony/Kia Klassic)	W 4–0	26–4	
Mar 23	vs Oklahoma State*	No. 2	Titan Softball Complex • Fullerton, CA (Pony/Kia Klassic)	W 7–3	27–4	
Mar 24	at No. 7 Cal State Fullerton*	No. 2	Titan Softball Complex • Fullerton, CA (Pony/Kia Klassic)	W 1–0	28–4	
Mar 24	vs No. 1 Arizona*	No. 2		Titan Softball Complex • Fullerton, CA (Pony/Kia Klassic)	L 0–9	28–5
Mar 26	at Stanford	No. 2	Boyd & Jill Smith Family Stadium • Stanford, CA	W 7–0	29–5	2–1
Mar 26	at Stanford	No. 2	Boyd & Jill Smith Family Stadium • Stanford, CA	W 3–0	30–5	3–1
Mar 30	at No. 20 Arizona State	No. 3	Sun Devil Club Stadium • Tempe, AZ	W 5–4	31–5	4–1
Mar 30	at No. 20 Arizona State	No. 3	Sun Devil Club Stadium • Tempe, AZ	W 6–1	32–5	5–1
Mar 31	at No. 1 Arizona	No. 3	Rita Hillenbrand Memorial Stadium • Tucson, AZ	W 10–4	33–5	6–1
Mar 31	at No. 1 Arizona	No. 3	Rita Hillenbrand Memorial Stadium • Tucson, AZ	L 4–7	33–6	6–2

April
Date	Opponent	Rank	Site/stadium	Score	Overall record	Pac-10 record
Apr 6	at No. 3 UCLA	No. 2	Easton Stadium • Los Angeles, CA	W 4–1	34–6	7–2
Apr 6	at No. 3 UCLA	No. 2	Easton Stadium • Los Angeles, CA	L 3–4	34–7	7–3
Apr 13	No. 12 California	No. 2	Husky Softball Stadium • Seattle, WA	W 3–0	35–7	8–3
Apr 13	No. 12 California	No. 2	Husky Softball Stadium • Seattle, WA	W 3–2	36–7	9–3
Apr 14	Pacific Lutheran*	No. 2	Husky Softball Stadium • Seattle, WA	W 1–0	37–7	
Apr 14	Pacific Lutheran*	No. 2	Husky Softball Stadium • Seattle, WA	W 16–0	38–7	
Apr 20	No. 1 Arizona	No. 2	Husky Softball Stadium • Seattle, WA	W 2–1	39–7	10–3
Apr 20	No. 1 Arizona	No. 2	Husky Softball Stadium • Seattle, WA	W 7–0	40–7	11–3
Apr 27	at Oregon	No. 1	Howe Field • Eugene, OR	W 8–0	41–7	12–3
Apr 27	at Oregon	No. 1	Howe Field • Eugene, OR	W 9–4	42–7	13–3
Apr 28	at Oregon State	No. 1	Corvallis, OR	W 2–1	43–7	14–3
Apr 28	at Oregon State	No. 1	Corvallis, OR	W 5–0	44–7	15–3
Apr 30	Simon Fraser*	No. 1	Husky Softball Stadium • Seattle, WA	W 7–1	45–7	

May
Date	Opponent	Rank	Site/stadium	Score	Overall record	Pac-10 record
May 2	Oregon	No. 1	Husky Softball Stadium • Seattle, WA	W 8–0	46–7	16–3
May 2	Oregon	No. 1	Husky Softball Stadium • Seattle, WA	W 12–0	47–7	17–3
May 5	Stanford	No. 1	Husky Softball Stadium • Seattle, WA	W 6–0	48–7	18–3
May 5	Stanford	No. 1	Husky Softball Stadium • Seattle, WA	W 9–1	49–7	19–3
May 8	Oregon State	No. 1	Husky Softball Stadium • Seattle, WA	W 11–2	50–7	20–3
May 8	Oregon State	No. 1	Husky Softball Stadium • Seattle, WA	W 13–0	51–7	21–3
May 11	Arizona State	No. 1	Husky Softball Stadium • Seattle, WA	W 3–0	52–7	22–3
May 11	Arizona State	No. 1	Husky Softball Stadium • Seattle, WA	W 4–0	53–7	23–3
May 12	No. 4 UCLA	No. 1	Husky Softball Stadium • Seattle, WA	L 5–8	53–8	23–4

Postseason

NCAA Regional No. 8
Date	Opponent	Rank	Site/stadium	Score	Overall record	NCAAT record
May 17	Jacksonville State	No. 1	Husky Softball Stadium • Seattle, WA	W 2–0	54–8	1–0
May 18	No. 17 Oklahoma State	No. 1	Husky Softball Stadium • Seattle, WA	W 9–3	55–8	2–0
May 19	No. 17 Oklahoma State	No. 1	Husky Softball Stadium • Seattle, WA	W 9–1	56–8	3–0

NCAA Women's College World Series
Date	Opponent	Rank (Seed)	Site/stadium	Score	Overall record	WCWS Record
May 23	vs No. 24 (8) Princeton	No. 1 (1)	Golden Park • Columbus, GA	W 7–1	57–8	1–0
May 24	No. 11 (5) California	No. 1 (1)	Golden Park • Columbus, GA	W 8–7	58–8	2–0
May 26	No. 4 (3) UCLA	No. 1 (1)	Golden Park • Columbus, GA	W 9–2	59–8	3–0
May 27	No. 2 (2) Arizona	No. 1 (1)	Golden Park • Columbus, GA	L 4–6	59–9	3–1

== Ranking movements ==
Ranking movements Legend: ██ Increase in ranking ██ Decrease in ranking
	Week											
Poll	1	2	3	4	5	6	7	8	9	10	11	Final
NFCA/USA Today	4	2	3	2	3	2	2	2	1	1	1	2
