= 1995 NCAA Division I softball season =

College softball in the United States

- Preseason No. 1: Arizona
- Defending Champions: Arizona

Tournament
- Most conference bids: Pac-10 (4)

Women's College World Series
- Champions: UCLA (8th (10th overall) *VACATED title)
- Runners-up: Arizona (8th WCWS Appearance)
- Winning Coach: Sharron Backus (8th (10th overall) title)
- WCWS MOP: Tanya Harding (UCLA)

Seasons
- ← 1994 1996 →

The 1995 NCAA Division I softball season, play of college softball in the United States organized by the National Collegiate Athletic Association (NCAA) at the Division I level, began in February 1995. The season progressed through the regular season, many conference tournaments and championship series, and concluded with the 1995 NCAA Division I softball tournament and 1995 Women's College World Series. The Women's College World Series, consisting of the eight remaining teams in the NCAA Tournament and held in Oklahoma City at ASA Hall of Fame Stadium, ended on May 29, 1995.

== Conference standings ==
1995 Big Ten Conference softball standings
	Conf.						Overall
Team	W		L		T	PCT	W		L		T	PCT
No. 9 Michigan ‍†‍‡‍^{y}	22	–	6	–	0	.786	50	–	12	–	0	.806
Northwestern ‍‍‍	19	–	9	–	0	.679	38	–	19	–	0	.667
No. 6 Iowa ‍‍‍^{y}	18	–	10	–	0	.643	41	–	26	–	1	.610
Minnesota ‍‍‍	15	–	13	–	0	.536	27	–	29	–	0	.482
Indiana ‍‍‍	14	–	14	–	0	.500	27	–	28	–	0	.491
Ohio State ‍‍‍	11	–	17	–	0	.393	33	–	30	–	0	.524
Penn State ‍‍‍	10	–	18	–	0	.357	23	–	26	–	0	.469
Michigan State ‍‍‍	9	–	19	–	0	.321	24	–	29	–	0	.453
Purdue ‍‍‍	8	–	20	–	0	.286	23	–	31	–	0	.426
† – Conference champion ‡ – Tournament champion y – Invited to the NCAA tournament As of May 1995; Rankings from NFCA/USA Today

1995 Pacific-10 Conference softball standings
	Conf.				Overall
Team	W		L	PCT	W		L	PCT
No. 2 Arizona ‍†‍‍^{y}	24	–	4	.857	66	–	6	.917
No. 1 UCLA ‍‍‍^{y}	23	–	4	.852	50	–	6	.893
No. 14 California ‍‍‍^{y}	20	–	8	.714	41	–	21	.661
No. 15 Washington ‍‍‍^{y}	17	–	11	.607	50	–	23	.685
Oregon ‍‍‍	12	–	15	.444	25	–	26	.490
Arizona State ‍‍‍	10	–	18	.357	29	–	26	.527
Oregon State ‍‍‍	4	–	26	.133	13	–	41	.241
Stanford ‍‍‍	1	–	27	.036	14	–	36	.280
† – Conference champion y – Invited to the NCAA tournament As of June 30, 1995; Rankings from NFCA/USA Today

1995 Southland Conference softball standings
	Conf.						Overall
Team	W		L		T	PCT	W		L		T	PCT
No. 20 Nicholls State ‍†‍‍^{y}	28	–	2	–	0	.933	56	–	9	–	0	.862
Northeast Louisiana ‍‍‍	21	–	9	–	0	.700	34	–	23	–	1	.595
McNeese State ‍‍‍	22	–	10	–	0	.688	37	–	25	–	0	.597
Texas–San Antonio ‍‍‍	17	–	15	–	0	.531	30	–	18	–	1	.622
Sam Houston State ‍‍‍	15	–	17	–	0	.469	19	–	33	–	0	.365
Stephen F. Austin ‍‍‍	14	–	18	–	0	.438	24	–	27	–	0	.471
Texas–Arlington ‍‍‍	9	–	23	–	0	.281	22	–	34	–	0	.393
Southwest Texas State ‍‍‍	9	–	23	–	0	.281	17	–	35	–	0	.327
Northwestern Louisiana ‍‍‍	6	–	24	–	0	.200	12	–	36	–	0	.250
† – Conference champion y – Invited to the NCAA tournament No conference tournament As of May 20, 1995; Rankings from NFCA/USA Today

== Women's College World Series ==
The 1995 NCAA Women's College World Series took place from May 23 to May 26, 1995 in Oklahoma City.

Round of 16
1	Arizona	9^{5}
8	Princeton	1
4	UNLV	0
5	Cal State Fullerton	1
8	Princeton	1
4	UNLV	2
3	Southwestern Louisiana	5
6	Michigan	0
2	UCLA	2
7	Iowa	1
6	Michigan	7
7	Iowa	9

Quarterfinals
1	Arizona	11^{4}
5	Cal State Fullerton	0
3	Southwestern Louisiana	1
4	UNLV	5
3	Southwestern Louisiana	0
2	UCLA	3
5	Cal State Fullerton	5
7	Iowa	6^{9}

Semifinals
1	Arizona	8^{6}	—
UNLV	0	—
2	UCLA	5	—
7	Iowa	0	—

Finals
1	Arizona	2
2	UCLA	4

== Season leaders ==
Batting

- Batting average: .518 - Jennifer Brundage, UCLA Bruins
- RBIs: 128 – Laura Espinoza, Arizona Wildcats
- Home runs: 37 – Laura Espinoza, Arizona Wildcats

Pitching

- Wins: 33-3 – Carrie Dolan, Arizona Wildcats
- ERA: 0.50 (9 ER/126.0 IP) - Tanya Harding, UCLA Bruins
- Strikeouts: 367, Trinity Johnson, South Carolina Gamecocks

== Records ==
NCAA Division I season runs: 101 – Jenny Dalton, Arizona Wildcats

NCAA Division I season RBIs: 128 – Laura Espinoza, Arizona Wildcats

NCAA Division I season home runs: 37 – Laura Espinoza, Arizona Wildcats

NCAA Division I season total bases: 232 – Laura Espinoza, Arizona Wildcats

NCAA Division I single game RBIs: 11 – Tiffany Whittall, Louisiana Ragin' Cajuns; April 15, 1995

NCAA Division I single game SINGLE GAME runs: 7 – Ellen Burns, Michelle Lafomara & Stephanie Riggins, Cornell Big Red; March 19, 1995

Sophomore class single game hits: 7 – Michelle Lafomara, Cornell Big Red; March 19, 1995

Sophomore class consecutive games hit streak: 35 – Robyn Yorke, Fresno State Bulldogs; February 12-April 1, 1995

Sophomore class hits: 114 – Robyn Yorke, Fresno State Bulldogs

Sophomore class triples: 16 – Jennifer Egan, Monmouth Hawks

Team hits: 765 – Arizona Wildcats

Team RBIs: 566 – Arizona Wildcats

Team triples: 47 – Monmouth Hawks

== Awards ==
- Honda Sports Award Softball:

Jennifer Brundage, UCLA Bruins

YEAR	G	AB	R	H	BA	RBI	HR	3B	2B	TB	SLG	BB	SO	SB	SBA
1995	56	168	59	87	.518	60	14	3	15	150	.893%	37	17	6	9

== All America Teams ==
The following players were members of the All-American Teams.

First Team

Position	Player	Class	School
P	Brooke Wilkins	SO.	Hawaii Rainbow Wahine
P	Carrie Dolan	SO.	Arizona Wildcats
P	Cheryl Longeway	JR.	ULL Rajin' Cajuns
C	Gillian Boxx	SR.	California Golden Bears
1B	Amy Chellevold	SR.	Arizona Wildcats
2B	Jenny Dalton	JR.	Arizona Wildcats
3B	Jennifer Brundage	SR.	UCLA Bruins
SS	Laura Espinoza	SR.	Arizona Wildcats
OF	Laura Berg	SO.	Fresno State Bulldogs
OF	Robyn Yorke	SO.	Fresno State Bulldogs
OF	Leah O'Brien	SO.	Arizona Wildcats
DP	Kathy Morton	SR.	ULL Rajin' Cajuns
UT	Sara Griffin	FR.	Michigan Wolverines
AT-L	Kelly Kovach	SR.	Michigan Wolverines
AT-L	Cyndi Parus	SR.	UNLV Rebels
AT-L	Kim Rondina	SO.	UNLV Rebels
AT-L	Leah Braatz	SO.	Arizona Wildcats
AT-L	Missy Nowak	SR.	DePaul Blue Demons

Second Team

Position	Player	Class	School
P	Terri Kobata	JR.	Notre Dame Fighting Irish
P	Susie Bugliarello	SO.	Sacramento State Hornets
P	Whitney Floyd	SO.	California Golden Bears
C	Tiffany Whittall	SR.	ULL Rajin' Cajuns
1B	Stephanie DeFeo	SO.	ULL Rajin' Cajuns
2B	Kelly Howard	JR.	UCLA Bruins
3B	Tobin Echo-Hawk	JR.	Nebraska Cornhuskers
SS	Ali Viola	FR.	Nebraska Cornhuskers
OF	Sara Mallett	JR.	UNLV Rebels
OF	Dana Fulmer	SR.	South Carolina Gamecocks
OF	Lana Jimenez	SO.	ULL Rajin' Cajuns
DP	Jen Ackley	FR.	California Golden Bears
UT	Scia Maumausolo	JR.	CSUN Matadors
AT-L	Amie Stewart	SR.	UNLV Rebels
AT-L	Lynn Britton	JR.	ULL Rajin' Cajuns
AT-L	Nicole Odom	SO.	UCLA Bruins
AT-L	Tanya Harding	JR.	UCLA Bruins
AT-L	Kim Ward	SR.	Oklahoma State Cowgirls

Third Team

Position	Player	Class	School
P	Trinity Johnson	SO.	South Carolina Gamecocks
P	Jodi Burch	SR.	Illinois State Redbirds
P	Brea Moore	SR.	Oklahoma Sooners
C	Julie Crandall	FR.	UNLV Rebels
1B	Alleah Poulson	SO.	UCLA Bruins
2B	Chris Zboril	JR.	Cal State Fullerton Titans
3B	Cindy Lawton	SR.	FSU Seminoles
SS	Jen Babik	SR.	Princeton Tigers
OF	Andrea D'Innocenzo	SR.	Connecticut Huskies
OF	Shamalene Wilson	JR.	FSU Seminoles
OF	Rachel Nelson	SO.	Minnesota Golden Gophers
DP	Katie Marten	SO.	Notre Dame Fighting Irish
UT	Debbie Bilbao	FR.	Iowa Hawkeyes
AT-L	Michelle Venturella	SR.	Indiana Hoosiers
AT-L	Tina Plew	SO.	South Carolina Gamecocks
AT-L	Karie Langelier	SR.	Oklahoma State Cowgirls
AT-L	Mandy Pfeiffer	SO.	Princeton Tigers
AT-L	Tasha Reents	JR.	Iowa Hawkeyes
AT-L	Kari Knopf	SO.	Iowa Hawkeyes
