= 1996 Arizona Wildcats softball team =

American college softball season

1996 Arizona Wildcats softball

National Champion NCAA Tallahassee Regional champion
- Conference: Pacific-10 Conference
- Record: 58–9 (23–5 Pac-10)
- Head coach: Mike Candrea (11th season)
- Home stadium: Rita Hillenbrand Memorial Stadium

1996 Pacific-10 Conference softball standings
	Conf.				Overall
Team	W		L	PCT	W		L	PCT
No. 2 Washington ‍†‍‍^{y}	23	–	4	.852	59	–	9	.868
No. 1 Arizona ‍‍‍^{y}	23	–	5	.821	58	–	9	.866
No. 3 UCLA ‍‍‍^{y}	20	–	7	.741	47	–	11	.810
No. 6 California ‍‍‍^{y}	14	–	12	.538	41	–	23	.641
Arizona State ‍‍‍	10	–	18	.357	34	–	27	.557
Stanford ‍‍‍	7	–	19	.269	24	–	29	.453
Oregon ‍‍‍	5	–	18	.217	21	–	30	.412
Oregon State ‍‍‍	3	–	22	.120	15	–	35	.300
† – Conference champion y – Invited to the NCAA tournament As of May 31, 1996; Rankings from NFCA/USA Today

The 1996 Arizona Wildcats softball team represented the University of Arizona in the 1996 NCAA Division I softball season. The Wildcats were coached by Mike Candrea, who led his eleventh season. The Wildcats finished with a record of 58–9. They played their home games at Rita Hillenbrand Memorial Stadium and competed in the Pacific-10 Conference, where they finished second with a 23–5 record.

The Wildcats were invited to the 1996 NCAA Division I softball tournament, where they swept the West Regional and then completed a run through the Women's College World Series to claim their fourth NCAA Women's College World Series Championship.

== Roster ==
1996 Arizona Wildcats roster
Pitchers: 3 – Carrie Dolan – junior; 13 – Nancy Evans – junior; Catchers: 5 – Tanya Farhat – junior; 7 – Lety Pineda – sophomore; 31 – Leah Braatz – junior	Infielders: 8 – Krista Gomez – senior; 11 – Lisa Pitt Fr. 1B/P; 16 – Jenny Dalton – senior; 18 – Tiana Hejduk – sophomore; 21 – Michelle Churnock – freshman; 33 – Heidi Bomberger – junior	Outfielders: 6 – Alison Johnsen – sophomore; 10 – Julie Reitan – sophomore; 20 – Leah O'Brien – senior; 22 – Andrea Doty – junior; 26 – Brandi Shriver – junior

== Schedule ==
Legend
	Arizona win
	Arizona loss
*	Non-Conference game

1996 Arizona Wildcats softball game log
Regular season

February
Date	Opponent	Rank	Site/stadium	Score	Overall record	Pac-10 record
Feb 15	vs No. 7 UNLV*	No. 2	Tempe, AZ (Kajikawa Classic)	W 9–5	1–0	
Feb 16	vs No. 5 Cal State Fullerton*	No. 2	Tempe, AZ (Kajikawa Classic)	L 3–6	1–1	
Feb 16	vs No. 13 Florida State*	No. 2	Tempe, AZ (Kajikawa Classic)	W 8–4	2–1	
Feb 17	vs San Diego State*	No. 2	Tempe, AZ (Kajikawa Classic)	W 11–3	3–1	
Feb 17	vs UMass*	No. 2	Tempe, AZ (Kajikawa Classic)	W 4–2	4–1	
Feb 18	vs Ohio State*	No. 2	Tempe, AZ (Kajikawa Classic)	L 0–4	4–2	
Feb 23	New Mexico State*	No. 2	Rita Hillenbrand Memorial Stadium • Tucson, AZ (Arizona Classic)	W 8–0	5–2	
Feb 23	Ohio State*	No. 2	Rita Hillenbrand Memorial Stadium • Tucson, AZ (Arizona Classic)	W 6–4	6–2	
Feb 24	No. 4 Washington*	No. 2	Rita Hillenbrand Memorial Stadium • Tucson, AZ (Arizona Classic)	W 4–1	7–2	
Feb 24	Ohio State*	No. 2	Rita Hillenbrand Memorial Stadium • Tucson, AZ (Arizona Classic)	W 11–2	8–2	
Feb 25	New Mexico State*	No. 2	Rita Hillenbrand Memorial Stadium • Tucson, AZ (Arizona Classic)	W 10–0^{6}	9–2	

March
Date	Opponent	Rank	Site/stadium	Score	Overall record	Pac-10 record
Mar 1	Northwestern State*	No. 2	Rita Hillenbrand Memorial Stadium • Tucson, AZ	W 16–4	10–2	
Mar 1	Tennessee*	No. 2	Rita Hillenbrand Memorial Stadium • Tucson, AZ	W 12–3	11–2	
Mar 2	Tennessee*	No. 2	Rita Hillenbrand Memorial Stadium • Tucson, AZ	W 6–3	12–2	
Mar 2	Northwestern State*	No. 2	Rita Hillenbrand Memorial Stadium • Tucson, AZ	W 15–1	13–2	
Mar 3	Northwestern State*	No. 2	Rita Hillenbrand Memorial Stadium • Tucson, AZ	W 7–4	14–2	
Mar 7	North Carolina*	No. 3	Rita Hillenbrand Memorial Stadium • Tucson, AZ	W 19–3^{5}	15–2	
Mar 7	No. 14 Michigan*	No. 3	Rita Hillenbrand Memorial Stadium • Tucson, AZ	W 8–0^{6}	16–2	
Mar 8	North Carolina*	No. 3	Rita Hillenbrand Memorial Stadium • Tucson, AZ	W 18–9	17–2	
Mar 8	No. 10 Oklahoma*	No. 3	Rita Hillenbrand Memorial Stadium • Tucson, AZ	W 10–0	18–2	
Mar 9	Missouri*	No. 3	Rita Hillenbrand Memorial Stadium • Tucson, AZ	W 9–0	19–2	
Mar 10	No. 10 Oklahoma*	No. 3	Rita Hillenbrand Memorial Stadium • Tucson, AZ	W 10–0	20–2	
Mar 10	No. 4 Fresno State*	No. 3	Rita Hillenbrand Memorial Stadium • Tucson, AZ	W 4–2	21–2	
Mar 21	vs DePaul*	No. 1	Titan Softball Complex • Fullerton, CA (Pony/Kia Klassic)	W 6–5	22–2	
Mar 21	vs No. 12 Oklahoma	No. 1	Titan Softball Complex • Fullerton, CA (Pony/Kia Klassic)	W 2–1	23–2	
Mar 22	vs No. 8 South Carolina*	No. 1	Titan Softball Complex • Fullerton, CA (Pony/Kia Klassic)	L 0–1	23–3	
Mar 22	vs Georgia State*	No. 1	Titan Softball Complex • Fullerton, CA (Pony/Kia Klassic)	W 4–1	24–3	
Mar 23	vs Oregon State*	No. 1	Titan Softball Complex • Fullerton, CA (Pony/Kia Klassic)	W 12–2^{5}	25–3	
Mar 24	vs No. 6 UNLV*	No. 1	Titan Softball Complex • Fullerton, CA (Pony/Kia Klassic)	W 6–3	26–3	
Mar 24	vs No. 2 Washington*	No. 1	Titan Softball Complex • Fullerton, CA (Pony/Kia Klassic)	W 9–0^{5}	27–3	
Mar 29	No. 2 UCLA	No. 1	Rita Hillenbrand Memorial Stadium • Tucson, AZ	W 5–4	28–3	1–0
Mar 29	No. 2 UCLA	No. 1	Rita Hillenbrand Memorial Stadium • Tucson, AZ	W 5–0	29–3	2–0
Mar 31	No. 3 Washington	No. 1	Rita Hillenbrand Memorial Stadium • Tucson, AZ	L 4–10	29–4	2–1
Mar 31	No. 3 Washington	No. 1	Rita Hillenbrand Memorial Stadium • Tucson, AZ	W 7–4	30–4	3–1

April
Date	Opponent	Rank	Site/stadium	Score	Overall record	Pac-10 record
Apr 5	Stanford	No. 1	Rita Hillenbrand Memorial Stadium • Tucson, AZ	W 5–0	31–4	4–1
Apr 5	Stanford	No. 1	Rita Hillenbrand Memorial Stadium • Tucson, AZ	W 10–3	32–4	5–1
Apr 6	No. 11 California	No. 1	Rita Hillenbrand Memorial Stadium • Tucson, AZ	W 7–2	33–4	6–1
Apr 6	No. 11 California	No. 1	Rita Hillenbrand Memorial Stadium • Tucson, AZ	W 5–2	34–4	7–1
Apr 10	No. 20 Arizona State	No. 1	Rita Hillenbrand Memorial Stadium • Tucson, AZ	W 8–2	35–4	8–1
Apr 10	No. 20 Arizona State	No. 1	Rita Hillenbrand Memorial Stadium • Tucson, AZ	W 6–2	36–4	9–1
Apr 13	at No. 3 UCLA	No. 1	Easton Stadium • Los Angeles, CA	W 5–3	37–4	10–1
Apr 13	at No. 3 UCLA	No. 1	Easton Stadium • Los Angeles, CA	W 5–1	38–4	11–1
Apr 16	No. 4 Fresno State*	No. 1	Rita Hillenbrand Memorial Stadium • Tucson, AZ	W 7–3	39–4	
Apr 16	No. 4 Fresno State*	No. 1	Rita Hillenbrand Memorial Stadium • Tucson, AZ	L 1–2	39–5	
Apr 20	at No. 2 Washington	No. 1	Husky Softball Stadium • Seattle, WA	L 1–2	39–6	11–2
Apr 20	at No. 2 Washington	No. 1	Husky Softball Stadium • Seattle, WA	L 0–7	39–7	11–3
Apr 24	at Arizona State	No. 2	Tempe, AZ	W 2–1^{9}	40–7	12–3
Apr 24	at Arizona State	No. 2	Tempe, AZ	W 6–0	41–7	13–3
Apr 27	at No. 12 California	No. 2	Levine-Fricke Field • Berkeley, CA	L 1–3	41–8	13–4
Apr 27	at No. 12 California	No. 2	Levine-Fricke Field • Berkeley, CA	L 1–3	41–9	13–5
Apr 28	at Stanford	No. 2	Stanford, CA	W 6–3	42–9	14–5
Apr 28	at Stanford	No. 2	Stanford, CA	W 9–0	43–9	15–5

May
Date	Opponent	Rank	Site/stadium	Score	Overall record	Pac-10 record
May 3	Oregon State	No. 2	Rita Hillenbrand Memorial Stadium • Tucson, AZ	W 10–2	44–9	16–5
May 3	Oregon State	No. 2	Rita Hillenbrand Memorial Stadium • Tucson, AZ	W 11–4	45–9	17–5
May 4	Oregon	No. 2	Rita Hillenbrand Memorial Stadium • Tucson, AZ	W 10–3	46–9	18–5
May 4	Oregon	No. 2	Rita Hillenbrand Memorial Stadium • Tucson, AZ	W 7–0	47–9	19–5
May 11	at Oregon	No. 2	Howe Field • Eugene, OR	W 6–1	48–9	20–5
May 11	at Oregon	No. 2	Howe Field • Eugene, OR	W 11–0	49–9	21–5
May 12	at Oregon State	No. 2	Corvallis, OR	W 2–0	50–9	22–5
May 12	at Oregon State	No. 2	Corvallis, OR	W 5–0	51–9	23–5

Postseason

NCAA Tallahassee Regional
Date	Opponent	Rank (seed)	Site/stadium	Score	Overall record	NCAAT record
May 17	Troy State	No. 2	Tallahassee, FL	W 8–0	52–9	1–0
May 18	No. 16 Florida State	No. 2	Tallahassee, FL	W 9–6	53–9	2–0
May 19	No. 16 Florida State	No. 2	Tallahassee, FL	W 10–3	54–9	3–0

NCAA Women's College World Series
Date	Opponent	Rank	Site/stadium	Score	Overall record	WCWS Record
May 23	No. 14 (7) Iowa	No. 2 (2)	Golden Park • Columbus, GA	W 5–2	55–9	1–0
May 24	No. 4 (3) UCLA	No. 2 (2)	Golden Park • Columbus, GA	W 3–0	56–9	2–0
May 26	No. 14 (7) Iowa	No. 2 (2)	Golden Park • Columbus, GA	W 10–2^{6}	57–9	3–0
May 27	No. 1 (1) Washington	No. 2 (2)	Golden Park • Columbus, GA	W 6–4	58–9	4–0

== Ranking movements ==
Ranking movements Legend: ██ Increase in ranking ██ Decrease in ranking
	Week											
Poll	1	2	3	4	5	6	7	8	9	10	11	Final
NFCA/USA Today	2	3	2	1	1	1	1	1	2	2	2	1
