= 1995 Arizona Wildcats softball team =

American college softball season

1995 Arizona Wildcats softball

Pac-10 champion NCAA Regional champion

Women's College World Series, runner-up
- Conference: Pacific-10 Conference
- Record: 66–6 (24–4 Pac-10)
- Head coach: Mike Candrea (10th season)

1995 Pacific-10 Conference softball standings
	Conf.				Overall
Team	W		L	PCT	W		L	PCT
No. 2 Arizona ‍†‍‍^{y}	24	–	4	.857	66	–	6	.917
No. 1 UCLA ‍‍‍^{y}	23	–	4	.852	50	–	6	.893
No. 14 California ‍‍‍^{y}	20	–	8	.714	41	–	21	.661
No. 15 Washington ‍‍‍^{y}	17	–	11	.607	50	–	23	.685
Oregon ‍‍‍	12	–	15	.444	25	–	26	.490
Arizona State ‍‍‍	10	–	18	.357	29	–	26	.527
Oregon State ‍‍‍	4	–	26	.133	13	–	41	.241
Stanford ‍‍‍	1	–	27	.036	14	–	36	.280
† – Conference champion y – Invited to the NCAA tournament As of June 30, 1995; Rankings from NFCA/USA Today

The 1995 Arizona Wildcats softball team represented the University of Arizona in the 1995 NCAA Division I softball season. The Wildcats were coached by Mike Candrea, who led his tenth season. The Wildcats finished with a record of 66–6. They competed in the Pacific-10 Conference, where they finished first with a 24–4 record.

The Wildcats were invited to the 1995 NCAA Division I softball tournament, where they swept the Regional and then completed a run to the title game of the Women's College World Series where they fell to champion UCLA. The Bruins' participation and championship were later vacated by the NCAA.

== Personnel ==
=== Roster ===
1995 Arizona Wildcats roster
Pitchers: 3 – Carrie Dolan – sophomore; 20 - Leah O'Brien – junior; 32 – Nancy Evans – sophomore; Catchers: 7 – Lety Pineda – freshman; 31 – Leah Braatz – sophomore	Infielders: 13 – Amy Chellevold – senior; 16 - Jenny Dalton – junior; 30 – Laura Espinoza – senior	Outfielders: 6 – Alison Johnsen – freshman; 8 – Krista Gomez – junior; 10 – Julie Reitan – freshman; 22 – Andrea Doty – sophomore; 26 – Brandi Shriver – sophomore

=== Coaches ===
1995 Arizona Wildcats softball coaching staff
- Mike Candrea - Head coach - 10th season
- Larry Ray - Assistant coach - 10th season
- Stacy Hill - Assistant coach - 1st season

== Schedule ==
Legend
	Arizona win
	Arizona loss
*	Non-Conference game

1995 Arizona Wildcats softball game log
Regular season

February
Date	Opponent	Site/stadium	Score	Overall record	Pac-10 record
Feb 11	New Mexico State*	Rita Hillenbrand Memorial Stadium • Tucson, AZ	W 13–0^{5}	1–0	
Feb 11	New Mexico State*	Rita Hillenbrand Memorial Stadium • Tucson, AZ	W 7–1	2–0	
Feb 16	vs No. 4 Cal State Fullerton*	Tempe, AZ	W 10–6	3–0	
Feb 17	vs Utah*	Tempe, AZ	W 5–3	4–0	
Feb 18	vs Illinois State*	Tempe, AZ	W 13–0^{5}	5–0	
Feb 18	vs No. 11 Oklahoma State*	Tempe, AZ	W 14–3^{5}	6–0	
Feb 19	vs No. 12 Florida State*	Tempe, AZ	W 7–1	7–0	
Feb 24	vs No. 18 Oklahoma*	Aggie Softball Complex • College Station, TX	W 12–1^{5}	8–0	
Feb 24	at No. 13 Texas A&M*	Aggie Softball Complex • College Station, TX	W 6–0	9–0	
Feb 25	vs No. 14 Southwestern Louisiana*	Aggie Softball Complex • College Station, TX	W 4–0	10–0	
Feb 25	vs No. 18 Oklahoma*	Aggie Softball Complex • College Station, TX	W 8–2	11–0	
Feb 26	at No. 13 Texas A&M*	Aggie Softball Complex • College Station, TX	W 8–5^{5}	12–0	
Feb 26	vs No. 14 Southwestern Louisiana*	Aggie Softball Complex • College Station, TX	W 9–4^{5}	13–0	

March
Date	Opponent	Site/stadium	Score	Overall record	Pac-10 record
Mar 4	New Mexico*	Rita Hillenbrand Memorial Stadium • Tucson, AZ	W 11–0^{5}	14–0	
Mar 4	No. 22 Pacific*	Rita Hillenbrand Memorial Stadium • Tucson, AZ	W 10–5^{5}	15–0	
Mar 5	New Mexico*	Rita Hillenbrand Memorial Stadium • Tucson, AZ	W 8–0^{5}	16–0	
Mar 5	No. 22 Pacific*	Rita Hillenbrand Memorial Stadium • Tucson, AZ	W 12–1^{5}	17–0	
Mar 10	McNeese State*	Rita Hillenbrand Memorial Stadium • Tucson, AZ	W 9–3	18–0	
Mar 10	McNeese State*	Rita Hillenbrand Memorial Stadium • Tucson, AZ	W 10–1^{5}	19–0	
Mar 11	New Mexico State*	Rita Hillenbrand Memorial Stadium • Tucson, AZ	W 9–0^{5}	20–0	
Mar 11	New Mexico State*	Rita Hillenbrand Memorial Stadium • Tucson, AZ	W 6–0	21–0	
Mar 12	No. 20 Oklahoma*	Rita Hillenbrand Memorial Stadium • Tucson, AZ	W 7–0	22–0	
Mar 12	No. 20 Oklahoma*	Rita Hillenbrand Memorial Stadium • Tucson, AZ	W 13–5^{5}	23–0	
Mar 14	No. 24 Oklahoma*	Rita Hillenbrand Memorial Stadium • Tucson, AZ	W 19–1^{5}	24–0	
Mar 14	No. 24 Oklahoma*	Rita Hillenbrand Memorial Stadium • Tucson, AZ	W 11–3^{5}	25–0	
Mar 17	No. 2 UCLA	Rita Hillenbrand Memorial Stadium • Tucson, AZ	W 11–4	26–0	1–0
Mar 17	No. 2 UCLA	Rita Hillenbrand Memorial Stadium • Tucson, AZ	L 0–2	26–1	1–1
Mar 18	Oregon	Rita Hillenbrand Memorial Stadium • Tucson, AZ	W 17–1^{5}	27–1	2–1
Mar 18	Oregon	Rita Hillenbrand Memorial Stadium • Tucson, AZ	W 14–0^{5}	28–1	3–1
Mar 23	vs UC Santa Barbara*	Titan Softball Complex • Fullerton, CA	W 6–0	29–1	
Mar 24	vs No. 7 Cal State Northridge*	Titan Softball Complex • Fullerton, CA	W 9–0	30–1	
Mar 24	vs No. 22 Texas A&M*	Titan Softball Complex • Fullerton, CA	W 2–0	31–1	
Mar 25	vs DePaul*	Titan Softball Complex • Fullerton, CA	W 11–1^{5}	32–1	
Mar 25	vs No. 4 UNLV*	Titan Softball Complex • Fullerton, CA	W 8–4	33–1	
Mar 26	vs No. 20 Washington*	Titan Softball Complex • Fullerton, CA	W 6–2	34–1	
Mar 26	at No. 6 Cal State Fullerton*	Titan Softball Complex • Fullerton, CA	W 7–6	35–1	

April
Date	Opponent	Site/stadium	Score	Overall record	Pac-10 record
Apr 1	at No. 16 Washington	Husky Softball Stadium • Seattle, WA	W 5–0^{10}	36–1	4–1
Apr 1	at No. 16 Washington	Husky Softball Stadium • Seattle, WA	W 6–2	37–1	5–1
Apr 8	at No. 2 UCLA	Easton Stadium • Los Angeles, CA	L 5–8	37–2	5–2
Apr 8	at No. 2 UCLA	Easton Stadium • Los Angeles, CA	L 2–4	37–3	5–3
Apr 9	at No. 3 Cal State Fullerton*	Titan Softball Complex • Fullerton, CA	W 5–3	38–3	
Apr 9	at No. 3 Cal State Fullerton*	Titan Softball Complex • Fullerton, CA	L 4–9	38–4	
Apr 14	Stanford	Rita Hillenbrand Memorial Stadium • Tucson, AZ	W 25–0^{5}	39–4	6–3
Apr 14	Stanford	Rita Hillenbrand Memorial Stadium • Tucson, AZ	W 7–1	40–4	7–3
Apr 15	No. 10 California	Rita Hillenbrand Memorial Stadium • Tucson, AZ	W 4–2	41–4	8–3
Apr 15	No. 10 California	Rita Hillenbrand Memorial Stadium • Tucson, AZ	W 6–1	42–4	9–3
Apr 18	at No. 4 Fresno State*	Fresno, CA	W 3–0	43–4	
Apr 18	at No. 4 Fresno State*	Fresno, CA	W 9–0	44–4	
Apr 21	Arizona State	Rita Hillenbrand Memorial Stadium • Tucson, AZ	W 4–2	45–4	10–3
Apr 21	Arizona State	Rita Hillenbrand Memorial Stadium • Tucson, AZ	W 10–0^{6}	46–4	11–3
Apr 22	at Arizona State	Tempe, AZ	W 12–2^{5}	47–4	12–3
Apr 22	at Arizona State	Tempe, AZ	W 9–0	48–4	13–3
Apr 28	Oregon State	Rita Hillenbrand Memorial Stadium • Tucson, AZ	W 4–0	49–4	14–3
Apr 28	Oregon State	Rita Hillenbrand Memorial Stadium • Tucson, AZ	W 8–0	50–4	15–3
Apr 29	No. 19 Washington	Rita Hillenbrand Memorial Stadium • Tucson, AZ	W 7–0	51–4	16–3
Apr 29	No. 19 Washington	Rita Hillenbrand Memorial Stadium • Tucson, AZ	W 11–2	52–4	17–3

May
Date	Opponent	Site/stadium	Score	Overall record	Pac-10 record
May 6	at Oregon State	Corvallis, OR	W 10–0^{5}	53–4	18–3
May 6	at Oregon State	Corvallis, OR	W 13–0^{5}	54–4	19–3
May 7	at Oregon	Howe Field • Eugene, OR	W 10–0^{5}	55–4	20–3
May 7	at Oregon	Howe Field • Eugene, OR	W 5–1	56–4	21–3
May 12	at Stanford	Stanford, CA	W 12–0	57–4	22–3
May 12	at Stanford	Stanford, CA	W 8–0	58–4	23–3
May 13	at No. 11 California	Strawberry Field • Berkeley, CA	L 2–7	58–5	23–4
May 13	at No. 11 California	Strawberry Field • Berkeley, CA	W 15–1^{5}	59–5	24–4

Post-season

NCAA Regional
Date	Opponent	Site/stadium	Score	Overall record	NCAAT record
May 19	Ohio	Rita Hillenbrand Memorial Stadium • Tucson, AZ	W 8–0^{5}	61–5	1–0
May 20	No. 15 Nebraska	Rita Hillenbrand Memorial Stadium • Tucson, AZ	W 9–1^{6}	62–5	2–0
May 21	No. 10 Florida State	Rita Hillenbrand Memorial Stadium • Tucson, AZ	W 15–0^{5}	63–5	3–0

NCAA Women's College World Series
Date	Opponent	Seed	Site/stadium	Score	Overall record	WCWS Record
May 25	No. 21 (8) Princeton	(1)	ASA Hall of Fame Stadium • Oklahoma City, OK	W 9–1^{5}	64–5	1–0
May 26	No. 3 (5) Cal State Fullerton	(1)	ASA Hall of Fame Stadium • Oklahoma City, OK	W 12–0^{5}	65–5	2–0
May 28	No. 4 (4) UNLV	(1)	ASA Hall of Fame Stadium • Oklahoma City, OK	W 8–0^{6}	66–5	3–0
May 29	No. 2 (2) UCLA	(1)	ASA Hall of Fame Stadium • Oklahoma City, OK	L 2–4	66–6	3–1
