= 1995 NCAA Division I softball rankings =

1995 NCAA Division I softball season
- Preseason No. 1: Arizona
- Defending Champions: Arizona

Tournament
- Most conference bids: Pac-10 (4)

Women's College World Series
- Champions: UCLA (8th (10th overall) *VACATED title)
- Runners-up: Arizona (8th WCWS Appearance)
- Winning Coach: Sharron Backus (8th (10th overall) title)
- WCWS MOP: Tanya Harding (UCLA)

Seasons
- 1996 →

The following human polls make up the 1995 NCAA Division I women's softball rankings. The NFCA/USA Today Poll is voted on by a panel of 32 Division I softball coaches and ranks to top 25 teams nationally.

== Legend ==
	Increase in ranking
	Decrease in ranking
	Not ranked previous week
Italics	Number of first place votes
(#–#)	Win–loss record
т	Tied with team above or below also with this symbol

== NFCA/USA Today ==
	Week 1	Week 2	Week 3	Week 4	Week 5	Week 6	Week 7	Week 8	Week 9	Week 10	Week 11	Week 12	
1.	Arizona (18)	Arizona (18)	Arizona (18)	Arizona (20)	Arizona (20)	Arizona (20)	UCLA (20)	UCLA (20)	UCLA (20)	Arizona (12)	Arizona (20)	UCLA (17)	1.
2.	UCLA (2)	UCLA	UCLA	UCLA	UCLA	UCLA	Arizona	Arizona	Arizona	UCLA (8)	UCLA (8)	Arizona (3)	2.
3.	Fresno State	Fresno State	Fresno State	Fresno State	Fresno State	Cal State Fullerton	Cal State Fullerton	Fresno State	Fresno State	Cal State Fullerton	Cal State Fullerton	UNLV	3.
4.	Cal State Fullerton	UNLV	UNLV	UNLV	Cal State Fullerton	Fresno State	Fresno State	Cal State Fullerton	Cal State Fullerton	Fresno State	UNLV	Cal State Fullerton	4.
5.	UNLV	Cal State Fullerton	Cal State Fullerton	Michigan	UNLV	Michigan	UNLV	UNLV	UNLV	Southwestern Louisiana	Fresno State	Southwestern Louisiana	5.
6.	Cal State Northridge	Cal State Northridge	California	Cal State Fullerton	Michigan	UNLV	Southwestern Louisiana	Southwestern Louisiana	Southwestern Louisiana	UNLV	Southwestern Louisiana	Iowa	6.
7.	California	California	Cal State Northridge	Cal State Northridge	Cal State Northridge	Sacramento State	Sacramento State	Cal State Northridge	Michigan	Cal State Northridge	Cal State Northridge	Cal State Northridge	7.
8.	Nebraska	Michigan	Michigan	Hawaii	South Carolina	Cal State Northridge	Cal State Northridge	Sacramento State	Cal State Northridge	Michigan	Sacramento State	Fresno State	8.
9.	Hawaii	Hawaii	Florida State	Florida State	Sacramento State	Southwestern Louisiana	Michigan	Michigan	Sacramento State	Sacramento State	Michigan	Michigan	9.
10.	Michigan	Nebraska	Hawaii	South Carolina	Southwestern Louisiana	California	California	California	Florida State	Florida State	Florida State	Hawaii	10.
11.	Oklahoma State	South Carolina	South Carolina	California	Florida State	South Carolina	South Carolina	Florida State	California	Hawaii	California	Florida State	11.
12.	Florida State	Florida State	Nebraska	Sacramento State	Nebraska	Missouri	Missouri	Hawaii	Hawaii	California	Oklahoma State	Oklahoma	12.
13.	Texas A&M	Oklahoma State	Sacramento State	Nebraska	California	Florida State	Florida State	South Carolina	Oklahoma State	Oklahoma State	Hawaii	Princeton	13.
14.	Southwestern Louisiana	Missouri	Missouri	Missouri	Hawaii	Hawaii	Hawaii	Oklahoma State	South Carolina	South Carolina	South Carolina	California	14.
15.	South Carolina	Sacramento State	Oklahoma State	Southwestern Louisiana	Missouri	Nebraska	Nebraska	Missouri	Missouri	Nebraska	Nebraska	Washington	15.
16.	Missouri	Cal Poly	Kansas	UIC	Washington	UIC	UIC	Nebraska	Oklahoma	Oklahoma	Nicholls State	South Carolina	16.
17.	Sacramento State	Kansas	Cal Poly	Cal Poly	Cal Poly	Oklahoma State	Nicholls State	Washington	Nicholls State	Nicholls State	Oklahoma	Oklahoma State	17.
18.	Oklahoma	Texas A&M	Southwestern Louisiana	Oklahoma State	UIC	Washington	Oklahoma State	Nicholls State	Nebraska	Missouri	Missouri	Nebraska	18.
19.	Notre Dame	Southwestern Louisiana	UIC	Nicholls State	Oklahoma State	Nicholls State	Washington	UIC	Washington	UIC	Washington	Notre Dame	19.
20.	Kansas	Oklahoma	Texas A&M	Washington	Nicholls State	Cal Poly	Oklahoma	Oklahoma	UIC	Washington	UIC	Nicholls State	20.
21.	Long Beach State	Notre Dame	Nicholls State	Kansas	Kansas	Notre Dame	Notre Dame	Notre Dame	UIC	Louisiana Tech	Louisiana Tech	Sacramento State	21.
22.	Pacific	Washington	Notre Dame	Texas A&M	Notre Dame	Oklahoma	Cal Poly	Princeton	Cal Poly	Princeton	Princeton	UIC	22.
23.	Washington	Nicholls State	Washington	Notre Dame	Oklahoma	Princeton	Princeton	Cal Poly	Notre Dame	Cal Poly	Illinois State	Missouri	23.
24.	Cal Poly	Virginia	Oklahoma	Princeton	Texas A&M	Kansas	Iowa	Iowa	Louisiana Tech	Illinois State	Cal Poly	Illinois State	24.
25.	Minnesota	South Florida	Virginia	Oklahoma	Princeton т Iowa State т	Texas A&M	Kansas	Louisiana Tech	Iowa	Notre Dame	Northwestern	Connecticut	25.
	Week 1	Week 2	Week 3	Week 4	Week 5	Week 6	Week 7	Week 8	Week 9	Week 10	Week 11	Week 12	
		Dropped: No. 21 Long Beach State; No. 22 Pacific; No. 25 Minnesota	Dropped: No. 25 South Florida	Dropped: No. 25 Virginia	None	Dropped: No. 25 Iowa State	Dropped: No. 25 Texas A&M	Dropped: No. 25 Kansas	None	Dropped: No. 25 Iowa	Dropped: No. 25 Notre Dame	Dropped: No. 21 Louisiana Tech; No. 24 Cal Poly; No. 25 Northwestern	
