= 1996 NCAA Division I softball season =

American college softball season

- Defending Champions: UCLA

Tournament

Women's College World Series
- Champions: Arizona (4th title)
- Runners-up: Washington (1st WCWS Appearance)
- Winning Coach: Mike Candrea (4th title)
- WCWS MOP: Jenny Dalton (Arizona)

Seasons
- ← 1995 1997 →

The 1996 NCAA Division I softball season, play of college softball in the United States organized by the National Collegiate Athletic Association (NCAA) at the Division I level, began in February 1996. The season progressed through the regular season, many conference tournaments and championship series, and concluded with the 1996 NCAA Division I softball tournament and 1996 Women's College World Series. The Women's College World Series, consisting of the eight remaining teams in the NCAA Tournament and held in Columbus, Georgia at Golden Park, ended on May 27, 1996.

== Conference standings ==
1996 Big 12 Conference softball standings
	Conf.				Overall
Team	W		L	PCT	W		L	PCT
No. 12 Oklahoma ‍†‍‡‍^{y}	17	–	5	.773	50	–	20	.714
No. 15 Oklahoma State ‍†‍‍^{y}	17	–	5	.773	37	–	20	.649
Missouri ‍‍‍	10	–	8	.556	31	–	22	.585
No. 17 Nebraska ‍‍‍^{y}	10	–	8	.556	42	–	23	.646
No. 21 Texas A&M ‍‍‍^{y}	11	–	11	.500	39	–	21	.650
Kansas ‍‍‍	10	–	12	.455	31	–	26	.544
Iowa State ‍‍‍	6	–	13	.316	17	–	28	.378
Texas Tech ‍‍‍	1	–	20	.048	4	–	44	.083
† – Conference champion ‡ – Tournament champion y – Invited to the NCAA tournament Rankings from NFCA/USA Today

1996 Big Ten Conference softball standings
	Conf.						Overall
Team	W		L		T	PCT	W		L		T	PCT
No. 7 Michigan ‍†‍‡‍^{y}	20	–	4	–	0	.833	51	–	14	–	0	.785
No. 19 Minnesota ‍‍‍^{y}	17	–	6	–	0	.739	43	–	18	–	0	.705
No. 4 Iowa ‍‍‍^{y}	17	–	7	–	0	.708	49	–	19	–	0	.721
No. 23 Indiana ‍‍‍^{y}	16	–	7	–	0	.696	37	–	24	–	0	.607
Michigan State ‍‍‍	14	–	10	–	0	.583	37	–	19	–	0	.661
Purdue ‍‍‍	12	–	11	–	0	.522	36	–	21	–	0	.632
Northwestern ‍‍‍	8	–	16	–	0	.333	19	–	33	–	0	.365
Ohio State ‍‍‍	6	–	18	–	0	.250	19	–	43	–	0	.306
Penn State ‍‍‍	5	–	18	–	0	.217	24	–	26	–	0	.480
Wisconsin ‍‍‍	3	–	21	–	0	.125	14	–	39	–	1	.269
† – Conference champion ‡ – Tournament champion y – Invited to the NCAA tournament As of June 1996; Rankings from NFCA/USA Today

1996 Pacific-10 Conference softball standings
	Conf.				Overall
Team	W		L	PCT	W		L	PCT
No. 2 Washington ‍†‍‍^{y}	23	–	4	.852	59	–	9	.868
No. 1 Arizona ‍‍‍^{y}	23	–	5	.821	58	–	9	.866
No. 3 UCLA ‍‍‍^{y}	20	–	7	.741	47	–	11	.810
No. 6 California ‍‍‍^{y}	14	–	12	.538	41	–	23	.641
Arizona State ‍‍‍	10	–	18	.357	34	–	27	.557
Stanford ‍‍‍	7	–	19	.269	24	–	29	.453
Oregon ‍‍‍	5	–	18	.217	21	–	30	.412
Oregon State ‍‍‍	3	–	22	.120	15	–	35	.300
† – Conference champion y – Invited to the NCAA tournament As of May 31, 1996; Rankings from NFCA/USA Today

1996 Southland Conference softball standings
	Conf.						Overall
Team	W		L		T	PCT	W		L		T	PCT
No. 22 Nicholls State ‍†‍‍^{y}	19	–	5	–	0	.792	42	–	17	–	1	.708
McNeese State ‍‍‍	17	–	7	–	0	.708	31	–	22	–	0	.585
Northeast Louisiana ‍‍‍	15	–	9	–	0	.625	34	–	22	–	0	.607
Texas–San Antonio ‍‍‍	15	–	9	–	0	.625	36	–	20	–	0	.643
Sam Houston State ‍‍‍	12	–	12	–	0	.500	23	–	25	–	0	.479
Texas–Arlington ‍‍‍	10	–	14	–	0	.417	28	–	30	–	0	.483
Southwest Texas State ‍‍‍	9	–	15	–	0	.375	18	–	40	–	0	.310
Northwestern Louisiana ‍‍‍	7	–	17	–	0	.292	10	–	41	–	0	.196
Stephen F. Austin ‍‍‍	4	–	20	–	0	.167	12	–	40	–	0	.231
† – Conference champion y – Invited to the NCAA tournament As of May 20, 1996; Rankings from NFCA/USA Today

== Women's College World Series ==
The 1996 NCAA Women's College World Series took place from May 23 to May 37, 1996 in Columbus, Georgia. The event was held at the same venue that would later host the softball events of the 1996 Summer Olympics.

Round of 16
1	Washington	7
8	Princeton	1
4	Southwestern Louisiana	0
5	California	2
8	Princeton	0
4	Southwestern Louisiana	7
3	UCLA	2
6	Michigan	0
2	Arizona	5
7	Iowa	2
6	Michigan	2
7	Iowa	3

Quarterfinals
1	Washington	9
5	California	7
3	UCLA	3
4	Southwestern Louisiana	2
3	UCLA	0
2	Arizona	4
5	California	0
7	Iowa	1

Semifinals
1	Washington	8	—
3	UCLA	2	—
2	Arizona	10^{6}	—
7	Iowa	2	—

Finals
1	Washington	4
2	Arizona	6

== Season leaders ==
Batting

- Batting average: .514 – Jennifer Weaver, Towson Tigers
- RBIs: 109 – Jenny Dalton, Arizona Wildcats
- Home runs: 25 – Jenny Dalton, Arizona Wildcats

Pitching

- Wins: 35-6 – Carrie Dolan, Arizona Wildcats
- ERA: 0.48 (16 ER/230.2 IP) – Trinity Johnson, South Carolina Gamecocks
- Strikeouts: 351 – Audrey West, Boston Terriers

== Records ==
NCAA Division I season doubles: 29 – Nina Lindenberg, Fresno State Bulldogs

NCAA Division I single game stolen bases: 7 – Stacy Hughes, Tennessee Tech Golden Eagles; April 14, 1996

Sophomore class RBIs: 96 – Leticia Pineda, Arizona Wildcats

Senior class season of perfect stolen bases: 47-47 – Gina Freeman, South Carolina Lady Bulldogs

Team doubles: 142 – Tennessee Volunteers

== Awards ==
- Honda Sports Award Softball:

Jenny Dalton, Arizona Wildcats

YEAR	G	AB	R	H	BA	RBI	HR	3B	2B	TB	SLG	BB	SO	SB	SBA
1996	67	179	84	84	.469	109	25	1	12	173	.966%	64	11	19	20

== All America Teams ==
The following players were members of the All-American Teams.

First Team

Position	Player	Class	School
P	Heather Meyer	SR.	Washington Huskies
P	B'Ann Burns	JR.	UCLA Bruins
P	Cheryl Longeway	SR.	ULL Rajin' Cajuns
C	Leticia Pineda	SO.	Arizona Wildcats
1B	Michelle Church	SR.	Washington Huskies
2B	Jenny Dalton	SR.	Arizona Wildcats
3B	Christine Kubin	SR.	North Carolina Tar Heels
SS	Ali Viola	SO.	Nebraska Cornhuskers
OF	Alison McCutcheon	JR.	Arizona Wildcats
OF	Shamalene Wilson	SR.	FSU Seminoles
OF	Rachel Nelson	JR.	Minnesota Golden Gophers
DP	Lisa Dacquisto	JR.	Arizona State Sun Devils
UT	Sara Griffin	SO.	Michigan Wolverines
AT-L	Lindsay Parker	FR.	Fresno State Bulldogs
AT-L	Scia Maumausolo	SR.	CSUN Matadors
AT-L	Kendall Richards	SR.	Texas A&M Aggies
AT-L	Nina Lindenberg	SO.	Fresno State Bulldogs
AT-L	Sara Pickering	JR.	Washington Huskies

Second Team

Position	Player	Class	School
P	Trinity Johnson	JR.	South Carolina Gamecocks
P	Susie Bugliarello	JR.	Sacramento State Hornets
P	Carrie Dolan	JR.	Arizona Wildcats
C	Jennifer Cline	SR.	Washington Huskies
1B	Alleah Poulson	JR.	UCLA Bruins
2B	Cynthia Smith	SR.	Oklahoma State Cowgirls
3B	Krista Gomez	SR.	Arizona Wildcats
SS	Keri Lemasters	JR.	Michigan State Spartans
OF	Rashunda Taylor	SR.	Nicholls State Colonels
OF	Amber Hegland	SO.	Minnesota Golden Gophers
OF	Chanda Lee	JR.	South Carolina Gamecocks
DP	Tia Morenz	SO.	Hawaii Rainbow Wahine
UT	Jennifer Richardson	SR.	CSUN Matadors
AT-L	Brandi Shriver	JR.	Arizona Wildcats
AT-L	Myssi Calkins	JR.	FSU Seminoles
AT-L	Renee Espinoza	SR.	FSU Seminoles
AT-L	Jill Most	JR.	Oklahoma Sooners
AT-L	Patti Raduenz	SR.	Michigan State Spartans

Third Team

Position	Player	Class	School
P	Whitney Floyd	JR.	California Golden Bears
P	Audrey West	SR.	Boston Terriers
P	Gina Ugo	SR.	Indiana Hoosiers
C	Stephenie Little	SO.	Oklahoma State Cowgirls
1B	Kari Knopf	JR.	Iowa Hawkeyes
2B	Yvette Healy	FR.	DePaul Blue Demons
3B	Julie Adams	FR.	UCLA Bruins
SS	Christy Hebert	JR.	Iowa Hawkeyes
OF	Kellyn Tate	SO.	Michigan Wolverines
OF	Jenifer Henry	SR.	Fresno State Bulldogs
OF	Jamie Foutch	FR.	Oklahoma State Cowgirls
DP	Katie Marten	JR.	Notre Dame Fighting Irish
UT	Erin Field	SR.	Texas A&M Aggies
AT-L	Lynn Britton	SR.	ULL Rajin' Cajuns
AT-L	Kim Rondina	JR.	UNLV Rebels
AT-L	Carolyn Wilson	SO.	Pacific Tigers
AT-L	Tobin Echo-Hawk	SR.	Nebraska Cornhuskers
AT-L	Becky Newbry	FR.	Washington Huskies
AT-L	Robyn Yorke	JR.	Fresno State Bulldogs
