= 1995 UCLA Bruins softball team =

American college softball season

1995 UCLA Bruins softball

National Champion NCAA Regional champion
- Conference: Pacific-10 Conference
- Record: 50–6 (23–4 Pac-10)
- Head coach: Sharron Backus (21st season) & Sue Enquist (7th season)
- Home stadium: Easton Stadium

1995 Pacific-10 Conference softball standings
	Conf.				Overall
Team	W		L	PCT	W		L	PCT
No. 2 Arizona ‍†‍‍^{y}	24	–	4	.857	66	–	6	.917
No. 1 UCLA ‍‍‍^{y}	23	–	4	.852	50	–	6	.893
No. 14 California ‍‍‍^{y}	20	–	8	.714	41	–	21	.661
No. 15 Washington ‍‍‍^{y}	17	–	11	.607	50	–	23	.685
Oregon ‍‍‍	12	–	15	.444	25	–	26	.490
Arizona State ‍‍‍	10	–	18	.357	29	–	26	.527
Oregon State ‍‍‍	4	–	26	.133	13	–	41	.241
Stanford ‍‍‍	1	–	27	.036	14	–	36	.280
† – Conference champion y – Invited to the NCAA tournament As of June 30, 1995; Rankings from NFCA/USA Today

The 1995 UCLA Bruins softball team represented the University of California, Los Angeles in the 1995 NCAA Division I softball season. The Bruins were coached by Sharron Backus, who led her twenty-first season, and Sue Enquist, in her seventh season, in an uncommon co-head coach system. The Bruins played their home games at Easton Stadium and finished with a record of 50–6. They competed in the Pacific-10 Conference, where they finished second with a 23–4 record.

The Bruins were invited to the 1995 NCAA Division I softball tournament, where they swept the West Regional and then completed a run through the Women's College World Series to claim their seventh NCAA Women's College World Series Championship. The Bruins had earlier claimed an AIAW title in 1978 and NCAA titles in 1982, 1984, 1988, 1989, 1990, and 1992.

The Bruins' participation and championship were later vacated by the NCAA. In December 1995, the UCLA women's softball program was placed on probation after an investigation revealed that UCLA had awarded more scholarships than were permitted under NCAA rules. The Fresno Bee wrote that the violations "bring shame to college softball" and added, "The image of UCLA's softball program won't ever be the same. ... For two seasons, they went over the scholarship limit, the equivalent of cheating on taxes. Now they must pay."

Partly as a result of an NCAA probe prompted by a Los Angeles Times investigation into UCLA pitcher Tanya Harding, Backus announced her retirement in January 1997.

== Personnel ==
=== Roster ===
1995 UCLA Bruins roster
Pitchers: 4 – Kaci Clark; 12 - Tanya Harding; Catchers: 9 – Cindy Valero	Infielders: 32 - Jennifer Brundage; Utility: 13 – Jenny Brewster	Outfielders: 2 – Felicia Cruz; 22 – Kathi Evans	1 – Nicole Odom; 5 – Sandra Burkey; 6 – Laurie Fritz; 7 – Kari Robinette; 8 – Kelly Howard; 10 – B'Ann Burns; 11 – Ginny Mike-Mitchell; 14 – Alleah Poulson; 19 – Kim Wuest

=== Coaches ===
1995 UCLA Bruins softball coaching staff
- Sharron Backus - co-Head coach - 21st season
- Sue Enquist - co-Head coach - 7th season
- Kelly Inouye-Perez - Assistant Coach - 2nd season
- Yvonne Gutierrez - Volunteer Assistant Coach - 1st season

== Schedule ==
Legend
	UCLA win
	UCLA loss
*	Non-Conference game

1995 UCLA Bruins softball game log
Regular season

February
Date	Opponent	Site/stadium	Score	Overall record	Pac-10 record
Feb 8	San Diego State*	Easton Stadium • Los Angeles, CA	W 6–0	1–0	
Feb 11	at Arizona State	Tempe, AZ	W 8–0	2–0	1–0
Feb 11	at Arizona State	Tempe, AZ	W 7–0	3–0	2–0
Feb 17	vs Fresno State*	SDSU Field • San Diego, CA (SDSU Campbell/Cartier Classic)	W 4–1	4–0	
Feb 17	vs Long Beach State*	SDSU Field • San Diego, CA	W 3–0	5–0	
Feb 17	at San Diego State*	SDSU Field • San Diego, CA	W 6–2	6–0	
Feb 18	vs California*	SDSU Field • San Diego, CA	W 9–0^{5}	7–0	
Feb 18	vs Loyola Marymount*	SDSU Field • San Diego, CA	W 8–0^{6}	8–0	
Feb 18	vs Cal State Northridge*	SDSU Field • San Diego, CA	W 7–2	9–0	
Feb 19	vs Washington*	SDSU Field • San Diego, CA	W 6–2^{5}	10–0	
Feb 22	UC Santa Barbara*	Easton Stadium • Los Angeles, CA	W 10–0^{5}	11–0	
Feb 22	UC Santa Barbara*	Easton Stadium • Los Angeles, CA	W 10–3	12–0	
Feb 25	Long Beach State*	Easton Stadium • Los Angeles, CA	W 10–2^{5}	13–0	
Feb 25	Long Beach State*	Easton Stadium • Los Angeles, CA	W 9–0^{5}	14–0	

March
Date	Opponent	Site/stadium	Score	Overall record	Pac-10 record
Mar 3	Ohio State*	Easton Stadium • Los Angeles, CA (UCLA Easton/Reebok Invitational)	W 5–0^{6}	15–0	
Mar 4	Michigan*	Easton Stadium • Los Angeles, CA (UCLA Easton/Reebok Invitational)	L 4–5^{8}	15–1	
Mar 12	Arizona State	Easton Stadium • Los Angeles, CA	W 8–1	16–1	3–0
Mar 12	Arizona State	Easton Stadium • Los Angeles, CA	W 1–0	17–1	4–0
Mar 17	at Arizona	Rita Hillenbrand Memorial Stadium • Tucson, AZ	L 4–11	17–2	4–1
Mar 17	at Arizona	Rita Hillenbrand Memorial Stadium • Tucson, AZ	W 2–0	18–2	5–1
Mar 27	Washington	Easton Stadium • Los Angeles, CA	W 5–3^{9}	19–2	6–1
Mar 27	Washington	Easton Stadium • Los Angeles, CA	W 6–4	20–2	7–1
Mar 28	Oregon State	Easton Stadium • Los Angeles, CA	W 10–0^{6}	21–2	8–1
Mar 28	Oregon State	Easton Stadium • Los Angeles, CA	W 12–0^{5}	22–2	9–1

April
Date–	Opponent	Site/stadium	Score	Overall record	Pac-10 record
Apr 2	at San Jose State*	San Jose, CA	W 6–0	23–2	
Apr 2	at San Jose State*	San Jose, CA	W 15–1^{6}	24–2	
Apr 8	Arizona	Easton Stadium • Los Angeles, CA	W 8–5	25–2	10–1
Apr 8	Arizona	Easton Stadium • Los Angeles, CA	W 4–2	26–2	11–1
Apr 9	Sacramento State*	Easton Stadium • Los Angeles, CA	W 2–0	27–2	
Apr 9	Sacramento State*	Easton Stadium • Los Angeles, CA	W 3–0	28–2	
Apr 14	at Oregon	Howe Field • Eugene, OR	W 7–0	29–2	12–1
Apr 15	at Oregon State	Corvallis, OR	W 2–0	30–2	13–1
Apr 15	at Oregon State	Corvallis, OR	W 2–0	31–2	14–1
Apr 20	Stanford	Easton Stadium • Los Angeles, CA	W 11–1^{6}	32–2	15–1
Apr 20	Stanford	Easton Stadium • Los Angeles, CA	W 10–0^{6}	33–2	16–1
Apr 22	California	Easton Stadium • Los Angeles, CA	W 2–0^{8}	34–2	17–1
Apr 22	California	Easton Stadium • Los Angeles, CA	W 5–3	35–2	18–1
Apr 26	Cal State Northridge*	Easton Stadium • Los Angeles, CA	W 2–0	36–2	
Apr 26	Cal State Northridge*	Easton Stadium • Los Angeles, CA	L 0–1^{10}	36–3	
Apr 29	at California	Levine-Fricke Field • Berkeley, CA	L 0–2	36–4	18–2
Apr 30	at Stanford	Stanford, CA	W 11–1^{6}	37–4	19–2
Apr 30	at Stanford	Stanford, CA	W 14–1^{5}	38–4	20–2

May
Date	Opponent	Site/stadium	Score	Overall record	Pac-10 record
May 1	at Oregon	Howe Field • Eugene, OR	W 13–1^{5}	39–4	21–2
May 1	at Oregon	Howe Field • Eugene, OR	W 5–0	40–4	22–2
May 2	at California	Levine-Fricke Field • Berkeley, CA	L 2–4	40–5	22–3
May 7	at Washington	Husky Softball Stadium • Seattle, WA	W 3–0	41–5	23–3
May 7	at Washington	Husky Softball Stadium • Seattle, WA	L 0–1	41–6	23–4
May 13	Cal Poly*	Easton Stadium • Los Angeles, CA	W 7–0	42–6	
May 13	Cal Poly	Easton Stadium • Los Angeles, CA	W 2–1	43–6	

Postseason

NCAA Regional
Date	Opponent	Site/stadium	Score	Overall record	NCAAT record
May 19	Campbell	Easton Stadium • Los Angeles, CA	W 8–0^{5}	44–6	1–0
May 20	Hawaii	Easton Stadium • Los Angeles, CA	W 9–0^{6}	45–6	2–0
May 21	Hawaii	Easton Stadium • Los Angeles, CA	W 4–3	46–6	3–0

NCAA Women's College World Series
Date	Opponent	Site/stadium	Score	Overall record	WCWS Record
May 26	(7) Iowa	ASA Hall of Fame Stadium • Oklahoma City, OK	W 2–1	47–6	1–0
May 26	(3) Southwestern Louisiana	ASA Hall of Fame Stadium • Oklahoma City, OK	W 3–0	48–6	2–0
May 28	(7) Iowa	ASA Hall of Fame Stadium • Oklahoma City, OK	W 5–0	49–6	3–0
May 29	(1) Arizona	ASA Hall of Fame Stadium • Oklahoma City, OK	W 4–2	50–6	4–0
