= 1996 NCAA Division I softball tournament =

- Teams: 32
- Finals site: Golden Park; Columbus, Georgia
- Champions: Arizona (4th title)
- Runner-up: Washington (1st WCWS Appearance)
- Winning coach: Mike Candrea (4th title)
- MOP: Jenny Dalton (Arizona)

The 1996 NCAA Division I softball tournament was the fifteenth annual tournament to determine the national champion of NCAA women's collegiate softball. Held during May 1996, thirty-two Division I college softball teams contested the championship. The tournament featured eight regionals of four teams, each in a double elimination format. The 1996 Women's College World Series was held in Columbus, Georgia from May 23 through May 27 and marked the conclusion of the 1996 NCAA Division I softball season. This marked the last time that the Women's College World Series was held in a city other than Oklahoma City, Oklahoma, and previewed Golden Park's hosting of softball events for the 1996 Summer Olympics. Arizona won their fourth NCAA championship by defeating Washington 6–4 in the final game. Arizona second baseman Jenny Dalton was named Women's College World Series Most Outstanding Player.

== Regionals ==
=== Regional No. 1 ===
First Round
Arizona	8^{5}
Troy State	0
Florida State	3
South Florida	1
Lower round 1
Troy State	5
South Florida	6

Semi-Finals
Arizona	9
Florida State	6
Lower final
Florida State	6
South Florida	0

Finals
Arizona	10	—
Florida State	3	—

Arizona qualifies for WCWS.

=== Regional No. 2 ===
First Round
South Carolina	3
Notre Dame	0
Michigan	3
Central Michigan	1
Lower round 1
Notre Dame	3
Central Michigan	9

Semi-Finals
South Carolina	0
Michigan	1
Lower final
South Carolina	6
Central Michigan	0

Finals
Michigan	10	—
South Carolina	1	—

Michigan qualifies for WCWS.

=== Regional No. 3 ===
First Round
Iowa	8^{5}
UNLV	0
Oklahoma	8^{5}
Northern Illinois	0
Lower round 1
UNLV	1
Northern Illinois	3

Semi-Finals
Iowa	1
Oklahoma	0
Lower final
Oklahoma	3
Northern Illinois	0

Finals
Iowa	7	—
Oklahoma	2	—

Iowa qualifies for WCWS.

=== Regional No. 4 ===
First Round
Southwestern Louisiana	1
Nicholls State	0
Nebraska	5
Minnesota	0
Lower round 1
Nicholls State	2
Minnesota	1

Semi-Finals
Southwestern Louisiana	9^{8}
Nebraska	4
Lower final
Nebraska	0
Nicholls State	2

Finals
Southwestern Louisiana	2	—
Nicholls State	1	—

Southwestern Louisiana qualifies for WCWS.

=== Regional No. 5 ===
First Round
Fresno State	5
Texas A&M	2
California	4
Long Beach State	1
Lower round 1
Texas A&M	1
Long Beach State	4

Semi-Finals
Fresno State	0
California	1
Lower final
Fresno State	3^{8}
Long Beach State	2

Finals
California	2^{9}	—
Fresno State	1	—

California qualifies for WCWS.

=== Regional No. 6 ===
First Round
Princeton	1
Boston University	0
UMass	1
Connecticut	0
Lower round 1
Boston University	5
Connecticut	0

Semi-Finals
Princeton	4
UMass	0
Lower final
UMass	0
Boston University	1

Finals
Princeton	3	—
Boston University	1	—

Princeton qualifies for WCWS.

=== Regional No. 7 ===
First Round
Cal State Northridge	5
Southwest Missouri State	0
Cal State Fullerton	5
UCLA	1
Lower round 1
Southwest Missouri State	1
UCLA	8

Semi-Finals
Cal State Northridge	0
Cal State Fullerton	11
Lower final
Cal State Northridge	5
UCLA	7

Finals
Cal State Fullerton	1	2
UCLA	14^{5}	7

UCLA qualifies for WCWS.

=== Regional No. 8 ===
First Round
Oklahoma State	2
Indiana	1
Washington	2
Jacksonville State	0
Lower round 1
Indiana	8^{6}
Jacksonville State	0

Semi-Finals
Oklahoma State	3
Washington	9
Lower final
Oklahoma State	3
Indiana	0

Finals
Washington	9^{5}	—
Oklahoma State	1	—

Washington qualifies for WCWS.

== Women's College World Series ==
=== Participants ===
1. Washington
2. Arizona
3. UCLA
4. Southwestern Louisiana
5. California
6. Michigan
7. Iowa
8. Princeton

=== Bracket ===
Round of 16
1	Washington	7
8	Princeton	1
4	Southwestern Louisiana	0
5	California	2
8	Princeton	0
4	Southwestern Louisiana	7
3	UCLA	2
6	Michigan	0
2	Arizona	5
7	Iowa	2
6	Michigan	2
7	Iowa	3

Quarterfinals
1	Washington	9
5	California	7
3	UCLA	3
4	Southwestern Louisiana	2
3	UCLA	0
2	Arizona	4
5	California	0
7	Iowa	1

Semifinals
1	Washington	8	—
3	UCLA	2	—
2	Arizona	10^{6}	—
7	Iowa	2	—

Finals
1	Washington	4
2	Arizona	6

=== Championship Game ===
School	Top Batter	Stats.
Arizona Wildcats	Jenny Dalton (2B)	1-2 3RBIs HR 2BBs
Washington Huskies	Leah Francis (PH)	1-1 RBI

School	Pitcher	IP	H	R	ER	BB	SO	AB
Arizona Wildcats	Carrie Dolan (W)	7.0	11	4	3	0	4	34
Washington Huskies	Heather Meyer (L)	1.2	6	5	5	1	0	11
Washington Huskies	Eve Gaw	5.1	5	1	1	3	1	21

=== All-Tournament Team ===
The following players were named to the All-Tournament Team

Pos	Name	School
P	Carrie Dolan	Arizona
P	Cheryl Longeway	Southwestern Louisiana
C	Jennifer Cline	Washington
1B	Traci Conrad	Michigan
2B	Jenny Dalton	Arizona
2B	Sara Pickering	Washington
3B	Lynn Britton	Southwestern Louisiana
SS	Tami Storseth	Washington
OF	Mindy Williams	Washington
OF	Lea Twigg	Iowa
OF	Alison Johnsen	Arizona
AL	Krista Gomez	Arizona
AL	Michelle Churnock	Arizona
AL	Lyn Nance	Iowa

== See also ==
- 1996 NCAA Division II softball tournament
- 1996 NCAA Division III softball tournament
- 1996 NAIA softball tournament
- 1996 NCAA Division I baseball tournament
