= 1995 NCAA Division I softball tournament =

American women's softball competition

- Teams: 32
- Finals site: ASA Hall of Fame Stadium; Oklahoma City, Oklahoma
- Champions: UCLA (8th (9th overall) title)
- Runner-up: Arizona (12th WCWS Appearance)
- Winning coach: Sharron Backus (8th (9th overall) title)
- MOP: Tanya Harding (UCLA)

The 1995 NCAA Division I softball tournament was the fourteenth annual tournament to determine the national champion of NCAA women's collegiate softball. Held during May 1995, thirty-two Division I college softball teams contested the championship. The tournament featured eight regionals of four teams, each in a double elimination format. The 1995 Women's College World Series was held in Oklahoma City, Oklahoma from May 25 through May 29 and marked the conclusion of the 1995 NCAA Division I softball season. UCLA won their eighth NCAA championship, and ninth overall, by defeating Arizona 4–2 in the final game. UCLA pitcher Tanya Harding was named Women's College World Series Most Outstanding Player, the first time the honor was awarded by the NCAA. The Bruins' participation and championship were later vacated by the NCAA.

== Regionals ==
=== Regional No. 1 ===
First Round
Notre Dame	5
UIC	2
Michigan	6
DePaul	0
Lower round 1
UIC	10^{6}
DePaul	0

Semi-Finals
Notre Dame	0
Michigan	2
Lower final
Notre Dame	8^{9}
UIC	5

Finals
Michigan	15^{5}	—
Notre Dame	6	—

- Michigan qualifies for WCWS

=== Regional No. 2 ===
First Round
Connecticut	3
UMass	0
Princeton	9
Hofstra	5
Lower round 1
UMass	0
Hofstra	3

Semi-Finals
Connecticut	0
Princeton	10^{6}
Lower final
Connecticut	3^{8}
Hofstra	2

Finals
Princeton	6	—
Connecticut	2	—

- Princeton qualifies for WCWS

=== Regional No. 3 ===
First Round
Nebraska	5
Florida State	1
Arizona	8^{5}
Ohio	0
Lower round 1
Florida State	2
Ohio	0

Semi-Finals
Nebraska	1
Arizona	9^{6}
Lower final
Florida State	6
Nebraska	2

Finals
Arizona	15^{5}	—
Florida State	0	—

- Arizona qualifies for WCWS

=== Regional No. 4 ===
First Round
Cal State Fullerton	9^{6}
Illinois State	1
Cal State Northridge	2
Missouri	1
Lower round 1
Illinois State	5
Missouri	1

Semi-Finals
Cal State Fullerton	1
Cal State Northridge	0
Lower final
Cal State Northridge	11
Illinois State	4

Finals
Cal State Fullerton	2^{8}	—
Cal State Northridge	1	—

- Cal State Fullerton qualifies for WCWS

=== Regional No. 5 ===
First Round
Washington	1
Louisiana Tech	0
Southwestern Louisiana	5
Nicholls State	1
Lower round 1
Louisiana Tech	1
Nicholls State	4

Semi-Finals
Washington	6
Southwestern Louisiana	7
Lower final
Washington	7
Nicholls State	2

Finals
Southwestern Louisiana	3	—
Washington	1	—

- Southwestern Louisiana qualifies for WCWS

=== Regional No. 6 ===
First Round
Iowa	3
Sacramento State	0
Fresno State	2
California	1
Lower round 1
Sacramento State	1
California	2

Semi-Finals
Iowa	1
Fresno State	0
Lower final
Fresno State	2
California	0

Finals
Iowa	0	2^{9}
Fresno State	1	1

- Iowa qualifies for WCWS, 3–1

=== Regional No. 7 ===
First Round
Oklahoma State	3
Utah	0
UNLV	10^{6}
Oklahoma	2
Lower round 1
Utah	1
Oklahoma	7

Semi-Finals
Oklahoma State	0
UNLV	5
Lower final
Oklahoma State	0
Oklahoma	2

Finals
UNLV	1	2
Oklahoma	2	0

- UNLV qualifies for WCWS

=== Regional No. 8 ===
First Round
Hawaii	3
South Carolina	2
UCLA	8^{5}
Campbell	0
Lower round 1
South Carolina	4
Campbell	1

Semi-Finals
Hawaii	0
UCLA	9^{6}
Lower final
Hawaii	2
South Carolina	0

Finals
UCLA	4	—
Hawaii	3	—

- UCLA qualifies for WCWS, 3–0

== Women's College World Series ==
=== Participants ===
1. Arizona
2. UCLA
3. Southwestern Louisiana
4. UNLV
5. Cal State Fullerton
6. Michigan
7. Iowa
8. Princeton

=== Bracket ===
Round of 16
1	Arizona	9^{5}
8	Princeton	1
4	UNLV	0
5	Cal State Fullerton	1
8	Princeton	1
4	UNLV	2
3	Southwestern Louisiana	5
6	Michigan	0
2	UCLA	2
7	Iowa	1
6	Michigan	7
7	Iowa	9

Quarterfinals
1	Arizona	11^{4}
5	Cal State Fullerton	0
3	Southwestern Louisiana	1
4	UNLV	5
3	Southwestern Louisiana	0
2	UCLA	3
5	Cal State Fullerton	5
7	Iowa	6^{9}

Semifinals
1	Arizona	8^{6}	—
UNLV	0	—
2	UCLA	5	—
7	Iowa	0	—

Finals
1	Arizona	2
2	UCLA	4

=== All-Tournament Team ===
The following players were named to the All-Tournament Team

Pos	Name	School
P	Tanya Harding	UCLA
P	Amie Stewart	UNLV
C	Leah Braatz	Arizona
1B	Kari Knopf	Iowa
2B	Kelly Howard	UCLA
3B	Jennifer Brundage	UCLA
SS	Julie Williams	Cal State Fullerton
OF	Leah O'Brien	Arizona
OF	Brandi Macias	Iowa
OF	Alison Johnsen	Arizona
AL	Nancy Evans	Arizona
AL	Brandi Shriver	Arizona

== See also ==
- 1995 NCAA Division II softball tournament
- 1995 NCAA Division III softball tournament
- 1995 NAIA softball tournament
- 1995 NCAA Division I baseball tournament
