= 2005 NCAA Division I softball season =

American college softball season

- Defending Champions: UCLA

Tournament

Women's College World Series
- Duration: June 2–8, 2005
- Champions: Michigan (1st title)
- Runners-up: UCLA (22nd WCWS Appearance)
- Winning Coach: Carol Hutchins (1st title)
- WCWS MOP: Samantha Findlay (Michigan)

Seasons
- ← 2004 2006 →

The 2005 NCAA Division I softball season, play of college softball in the United States organized by the National Collegiate Athletic Association (NCAA) at the Division I level, began in February 2005. The season progressed through the regular season, many conference tournaments and championship series, and concluded with the 2005 NCAA Division I softball tournament and 2005 Women's College World Series. The Women's College World Series, consisting of the eight remaining teams in the NCAA Tournament and held in Oklahoma City at ASA Hall of Fame Stadium, ended on June 8, 2005.

== Conference standings ==
2005 Big 12 Conference softball standings
	Conf.				Overall
Team	W		L	PCT	W		L	PCT
No. 11 Texas A&M ‍†‍‍^{y}	14	–	4	.778	47	–	10	.825
No. 13 Oklahoma ‍‍‍^{y}	12	–	6	.667	50	–	17	.746
No. 5 Texas ‍‍‍^{y}	11	–	6	.647	49	–	13	.790
No. 12 Baylor ‍‍‍^{y}	11	–	7	.611	51	–	14	.785
No. 20 Missouri ‍‍‍^{y}	10	–	8	.556	44	–	15	.746
Kansas ‍‍‡‍^{y}	9	–	8	.529	31	–	24	.564
No. 25 Nebraska ‍‍‍^{y}	9	–	9	.500	36	–	23	.610
Oklahoma State ‍‍‍^{y}	7	–	11	.389	35	–	24	.593
Texas Tech ‍‍‍	3	–	15	.167	23	–	25	.479
Iowa State ‍‍‍	3	–	15	.167	18	–	32	.360
† – Conference champion ‡ – Tournament champion y – Invited to the NCAA tournament Rankings from NFCA

2005 Big Ten Conference softball standings
	Conf.				Overall
Team	W		L	PCT	W		L	PCT
No. 1 Michigan ‍†‍‡‍^{y}	15	–	2	.882	65	–	7	.903
No. 16 Northwestern ‍‍‍^{y}	15	–	3	.833	42	–	18	.700
No. 24 Iowa ‍‍‍^{y}	12	–	6	.667	50	–	14	.781
Ohio State ‍‍‍	9	–	7	.563	32	–	17	.653
Wisconsin ‍‍‍^{y}	11	–	9	.550	31	–	24	.564
Penn State ‍‍‍^{y}	10	–	9	.526	36	–	23	.610
Purdue ‍‍‍	10	–	10	.500	34	–	24	.586
Michigan State ‍‍‍	7	–	9	.438	25	–	28	.472
Minnesota ‍‍‍	6	–	14	.300	25	–	27	.481
Illinois ‍‍‍	4	–	14	.222	24	–	26	.480
Indiana ‍‍‍	2	–	18	.100	13	–	41	.241
† – Conference champion ‡ – Tournament champion y – Invited to the NCAA tournament As of June 13, 2005; Rankings from NFCA

2005 Pacific-10 Conference softball standings
	Conf.				Overall
Team	W		L	PCT	W		L	PCT
No. 4 Arizona ‍†‍‍^{y}	13	–	8	.619	45	–	12	.789
No. 6 California ‍†‍‍^{y}	13	–	8	.619	52	–	15	.776
No. 15 Oregon State ‍†‍‍^{y}	13	–	8	.619	43	–	16	.729
No. 10 Stanford ‍†‍‍^{y}	13	–	8	.619	43	–	16	.729
No. 2 UCLA ‍‍‍^{y}	11	–	10	.524	40	–	20	.667
No. 14 Washington ‍‍‍^{y}	10	–	11	.476	35	–	22	.614
No. 23 Oregon ‍‍‍^{y}	7	–	14	.333	36	–	25	.590
Arizona State ‍‍‍^{y}	4	–	17	.190	30	–	26	.536
† – Conference champion y – Invited to the NCAA tournament As of June 30, 2005; Rankings from Coaches' Poll

2005 Southland Conference softball standings
	Conf.						Overall
Team	W		L		T	PCT	W		L		T	PCT
Texas–San Antonio ‍†‍‍	21	–	5	–	0	.808	42	–	18	–	0	.700
Sam Houston State ‍‍‍	19	–	7	–	0	.731	29	–	25	–	0	.537
Texas State ‍‍‍	18	–	8	–	0	.692	26	–	27	–	0	.491
Northwestern State ‍‍‍	15	–	12	–	0	.556	35	–	28	–	0	.556
Texas–Arlington ‍‍‍	13	–	13	–	0	.500	17	–	26	–	1	.398
McNeese State ‍‍‍^{y}	12	–	15	–	0	.444	34	–	35	–	0	.493
Southeastern Louisiana ‍‍‍	12	–	15	–	0	.444	20	–	27	–	0	.426
Nicholls State ‍‍‍	10	–	17	–	0	.370	18	–	34	–	0	.346
Stephen F. Austin ‍‍‍	8	–	19	–	0	.296	16	–	30	–	0	.348
Louisiana–Monroe ‍‍‍	5	–	22	–	0	.185	15	–	44	–	0	.254
† – Conference champion y – Invited to the NCAA tournament As of May 20, 2005; Rankings from Coaches' Poll

== Women's College World Series ==
The 2005 NCAA Women's College World Series took place from June 2 to June 8, 2005 in Oklahoma City.

First round
3	Arizona	0
11	Tennessee	1
7	UCLA	2
2	California	1
3	Arizona	3
2	California	2
1	Michigan	3
DePaul	0
12	Alabama	0
4	Texas	3
DePaul	1
12	Alabama	2

Second round
11	Tennessee	1
7	UCLA	3
3	Arizona	0
4	Texas	1
1	Michigan	4
4	Texas	0
12	Alabama	0
11	Tennessee	4

Semifinals
7	UCLA	4	X
4	Texas	0	X
1	Michigan	0	3
11	Tennessee	2	2

Finals
7	UCLA	5	2	1
1	Michigan	0	5	4

== Season leaders ==
Batting

- Batting average: .524 – Lauren Wible, Bucknell Bison
- RBIs: 77 – Samantha Findlay, Michigan Wolverines
- Home runs: 26 – Stephanie Best, UCF Knights

Pitching

- Wins: 50-9 – Monica Abbott, Tennessee Volunteers
- ERA: 0.36 (14 ER/272.2 IP) – Cat Osterman Texas Longhorns
- Strikeouts: 603 – Monica Abbott, Tennessee Volunteers

== Records ==
NCAA Division I season at bats: 270 – Lindsay Schutzler, Tennessee Volunteers

NCAA Division I season Games pitched: 69 – Monica Abbott, Tennessee Volunteers

Sophomore class strikeouts: 603 – Monica Abbott, Tennessee Volunteers

Junior class No hitters: 8 – Alicia Hollowell, Arizona Wildcats

Junior class strikeout ratio: 15.2 (593 SO/272.2 IP) – Cat Osterman, Texas Longhorns

Senior class doubles: 27 – Cameron Astiazaran, UIC Flames

Team shutouts: 51 – Tennessee Volunteers

== Awards ==
- USA Softball Collegiate Player of the Year:

Cat Osterman, Texas Longhorns

- Honda Sports Award Softball:

Cat Osterman, Texas Longhorns

- Women's Sports Foundation Sportswoman of the Year Award Team

Cat Osterman, Texas Longhorns

- Best Female College Athlete ESPY Award

Cat Osterman, Texas Longhorns

YEAR	W	L	GP	GS	CG	SHO	SV	IP	H	R	ER	BB	SO	ERA	WHIP
2005	30	7	42	33	31	22	0	272.2	68	23	14	48	593	0.36	0.42

== All America Teams ==
The following players were members of the All-American Teams.

First Team

Position	Player	Class	School
P	Monica Abbott	SO.	Tennessee Lady Vols
P	Cat Osterman	JR.	Texas Longhorns
P	Jennie Ritter	JR.	Michigan Wolverines
C	Kristen Rivera	SR.	Washington Huskies
1B	Garland Cooper	SO.	Northwestern Wildcats
2B	Tiffany Haas	SR.	Michigan Wolverines
3B	Vicky Galindo	SR.	California Golden Bears
SS	Courtney Bures	FR.	Mississippi State Bulldogs
OF	Sarah Fekete	JR.	Tennessee Lady Vols
OF	Marissa Nichols	FR.	UNLV Rebels
OF	Caitlin Lowe	SO.	Arizona Wildcats
DP	Cameron Astiazaran	SR.	UIC Flames
UT	Amanda Scarborough	FR.	Texas A&M Aggies
AT-L	Kristie Fox	SO.	Arizona Wildcats
AT-L	Brianne McGowan	JR.	Oregon State Beavers
AT-L	Kim Wendland	JR.	Georgia Bulldogs
AT-L	Jamie Southern	SR.	Fresno State Bulldogs
AT-L	Heather Scaglione	SR.	Oklahoma State Cowgirls

Second Team

Position	Player	Class	School
P	Michelle Green	SR.	Georgia Bulldogs
P	Alicia Hollowell	JR.	Arizona Wildcats
P	Kristina Thorson	JR.	California Golden Bears
C	Ashley Courtney	SR.	Alabama Crimson Tide
1B	Jennifer Curtier	SO.	Pacific Tigers
2B	Caitlin Benyi	JR.	UCLA Bruins
3B	Kristi Durant	JR.	Tennessee Lady Vols
SS	Amber Jackson	JR.	Bethune-Cookman Wildcats
OF	Catalina Morris	JR.	Stanford Cardinal
OF	Kristin Vesely	JR.	Oklahoma Sooners
OF	Harmony Schwethelm	JR.	Baylor Bears
DP	Megan Gibson	SO.	Texas A&M Aggies
UT	Holly Currie	SO.	Auburn Tigers
AT-L	Stephanie Churchwell	FR.	Northwestern Wildcats
AT-L	Anjelica Selden	FR.	UCLA Bruins
AT-L	Lindsay Schutzler	SO.	Tennessee Lady Vols
AT-L	Michelle Smith	FR.	Stanford Cardinal

Third Team

Position	Player	Class	School
P	Megan Meyer	SR.	Seton Hall Pirates
P	Sarah Pauly	SR.	Texas A&M-Corpus Christi Islanders
P	Jessica Sallinger	SR.	Georgia Tech Yellowjackets
C	Rachel Folden	FR.	Marshall Thundering Herd
1B	Page Jones	SR.	Auburn Tigers
2B	Anne Steffan	SR.	Nebraska Cornhuskers
3B	Norrelle Dickson	SO.	Oklahoma Sooners
SS	Jessica Merchant	JR.	Michigan Wolverines
OF	Danyele Gomez	JR.	ULL Ragin' Cajuns
OF	Megan Ciolli	SR.	Notre Dame Fighting Irish
OF	Tiffany Stewart	JR.	USF Bulls
DP	Nicole Motycka	SR.	Michigan Wolverines
UT	Ashley Esparza	FR.	Penn State Nittany Lions
AT-L	Lisa Birocci	SR.	Iowa Hawkeyes
AT-L	Kaleo Eldredge	SR.	California Golden Bears
AT-L	Courtnay Foster	JR.	Northwestern Wildcats
AT-L	Lauren Lappin	JR.	Stanford Cardinal
AT-L	Saskia Roberson	JR.	DePaul Blue Demons
