= 2005 NCAA Division I softball rankings =

2005 NCAA Division I softball season
- Defending Champions: UCLA

Tournament
- Duration: June 2–8, 2005

Women's College World Series
- Champions: Michigan (1st title)
- Runners-up: UCLA (22nd WCWS Appearance)
- Winning Coach: Carol Hutchins (1st title)
- WCWS MOP: Samantha Findlay (Michigan)

Seasons
- ← 2004 2006 →

The following human polls make up the 2005 NCAA Division I women's softball rankings. The NFCA/USA Today Poll is voted on by a panel of 30 Division I softball coaches and ranks to top 25 teams nationally.

== Legend ==
	Increase in ranking
	Decrease in ranking
	Not ranked previous week
Italics	Number of first place votes
(#–#)	Win-loss record
т	Tied with team above or below also with this symbol

== NFCA/USA Today ==
	Week 0 Pre	Week 1	Week 2	Week 3	Week 4	Week 5	Week 6	Week 7	Week 8	Week 9	Week 10	Week 11	Week 12	Week 13	Week Final Final	
1.	California (14)	California (19)	California (24)	Arizona (17)	Arizona (23)	Arizona (25)	Michigan (15)	Michigan (22)	Michigan (21)	Michigan (20)	Michigan (22)	Michigan (20)	Michigan (22)	Michigan (22)	Michigan (25)	1.
2.	UCLA (12)	Arizona (6)	Arizona (4)	California (8)	California (1)	California (1)	Arizona (9)	Arizona (1)	Arizona (3)	Arizona (4)	California (1)	Arizona (4)	California (1)	California (1)	UCLA	2.
3.	Arizona (4)	UCLA (1)	UCLA	Stanford	Stanford	Stanford	California (1)	California (1)	California (1)	California (1)	Texas	California (1)	Arizona	Arizona	Tennessee	3.
4.	Oklahoma	Stanford	Stanford	UCLA	Tennessee	UCLA	Tennessee	Tennessee	Tennessee	Texas	Arizona	Stanford	Stanford	Stanford	Arizona	4.
5.	LSU	Louisiana–Lafayette	Tennessee	Tennessee	UCLA	Michigan	Stanford	Texas	Texas	Oklahoma	Oklahoma	Texas A&M	Texas A&M	Texas A&M	Texas	5.
6.	Stanford	Alabama	Louisiana–Lafayette	Louisiana–Lafayette	Michigan	Tennessee	Texas	Stanford	Oklahoma	Tennessee	Texas A&M	Texas	Texas	Oregon State	California	6.
7.	Georgia	Tennessee	Alabama	Michigan	Louisiana–Lafayette	Louisiana–Lafayette	Oklahoma	UCLA	Texas A&M	Texas A&M	Stanford	Alabama	Oregon State	Texas	Alabama	7.
8.	Michigan	Michigan	Michigan	Alabama	Alabama	Oklahoma	UCLA	Oklahoma	Stanford	Stanford	Alabama	Oregon State	Georgia	Georgia	DePaul	8.
9.	Louisiana–Lafayette	LSU	Texas	Texas	Oklahoma	Alabama	Baylor	Texas A&M	Baylor	Alabama	Tennessee	Baylor	Alabama	Alabama	Georgia	9.
10.	Florida State	Texas	LSU	Baylor	Baylor	Baylor	Alabama	Baylor	Alabama	Oregon State	UCLA	Oklahoma	Tennessee	Oklahoma	Stanford	10.
11.	Washington	Baylor	Baylor	Oklahoma	Texas	Texas	Louisiana–Lafayette	Alabama	Georgia	Baylor	Oregon State	Tennessee	Oklahoma	Tennessee	Texas A&M	11.
12.	Alabama	Washington	Washington	LSU	LSU	Texas A&M	Texas A&M	Georgia	UCLA	Georgia	Baylor	Georgia	Baylor	UCLA	Baylor	12.
13.	Oregon	Georgia	Oklahoma	Georgia	Georgia	Georgia	Georgia	Louisiana–Lafayette	Oregon State	UCLA	Georgia	UCLA	Louisiana–Lafayette	Baylor	Oklahoma	13.
14.	Tennessee	Oklahoma	Florida	Washington	Texas A&M	Washington	Missouri	Florida	Louisiana–Lafayette	Louisiana–Lafayette	Louisiana–Lafayette	Louisiana–Lafayette	UCLA	Louiaiana–Lafayette	Washington	14.
15.	Texas	Oregon	Georgia Tech	Texas A&M	Washington	LSU	Florida	Missouri	Missouri	Missouri	Northwestern	Northwestern	Missouri	Fresno State	Oregon State	15.
16.	Oregon State	Florida	Georgia	Florida	Oregon State	Florida	Oregon State	Oregon State	Florida	Northwestern	Florida	Florida	Fresno State	Missouri	Northwestern	16.
17.	Baylor	Georgia Tech	Nebraska	Nebraska	Florida	Oregon State	Washington	Washington	Arizona State	Florida	Missouri	Georgia Tech	Georgia Tech	Georgia Tech	Georgia Tech	17.
18.	Nebraska	Florida State	Oregon	Oregon State	Nebraska	Nebraska	Nebraska	Arizona State	Northwestern	Fresno State	Georgia Tech	Fresno State	Auburn	Auburn	Bethune-Cookman	18.
19.	Fresno State	Nebraska	Texas A&M	Georgia Tech	Georgia Tech	Missouri	Arizona State	Georgia Tech	Fresno State	Georgia Tech	Creighton	Missouri	Northwestern	Northwestern	Louisiana–Lafayette	19.
20.	Long Beach State	Oregon State	FIU	Florida State	Missouri	Georgia Tech	Northwestern	Northwestern	Washington	Auburn	Fresno State	Auburn	Washington	Southern Illinois	Missouri	20.
21.	South Florida	Fresno State	Florida State	Oregon	Florida State	Arizona State	Georgia Tech	Fresno State	Georgia Tech	Arizona State	Auburn	Iowa	Iowa	Washington	Auburn	21.
22.	Illinois	Long Beach State	Oregon State	FIU	Fresno State	Florida State	LSU	Nebraska	Auburn	Creighton	Iowa	Washington	Southern Illinois	Iowa	Fresno State	22.
23.	Georgia Tech	Texas A&M	Long Beach State	Missouri	Northwestern	Northwestern	Fresno State	Auburn	Creighton	Iowa	Washington	Southern Illinois	Florida	Florida	Oregon	23.
24.	Southern Illinois	FIU	Missouri	Fresno State	Arizona State	Fresno State	Florida State	Iowa	Iowa	Washington	Arizona State	Creighton	Long Beach State	Long Beach State	Iowa	24.
25.	Hofstra	Illinois	Fresno State	Northwestern	Texas A&M–Corpus Christi	Auburn	Auburn	Creighton	Oregon	Oregon	Oregon	Long Beach State	Oregon	Nebraska	Nebraska	25.
	Week 0 Pre	Week 1	Week 2	Week 3	Week 4	Week 5	Week 6	Week 7	Week 8	Week 9	Week 10	Week 11	Week 12	Week 13	Week Final Final	
		Dropped: 21. South Florida; 24. Southern Illinois; 25. Hofstra	Dropped: 25. Illinois	Dropped: 23. Long Beach State	Dropped: 21. Oregon; 22. FIU	Dropped: 25. Texas A&M–Corpus Christi	None	Dropped: 22. LSU; 24. Florida State	Dropped: 22. Nebraska	None	None	Dropped: 24. Arizona State; 25. Oregon	Dropped: 24. Creighton	Dropped: 25. Oregon	Dropped: 20. Southern Illinois; 23. Florida; 24. Long Beach State	
