= 2005 Big Ten softball tournament =

College softball tournament in Michigan

- Teams: 8
- Format: Single-elimination
- Finals site: Alumni Field; Ann Arbor, Michigan
- Champions: Michigan (7th title)
- Runner-up: Iowa (7th title game)
- Winning coach: Carol Hutchins (7th title)
- MVP: Jessica Merchant (Michigan)
- Television: CSTV

2005 Big Ten Conference softball standings
	Conf.				Overall
Team	W		L	PCT	W		L	PCT
No. 1 Michigan ‍†‍‡‍^{y}	15	–	2	.882	65	–	7	.903
No. 16 Northwestern ‍‍‍^{y}	15	–	3	.833	42	–	18	.700
No. 24 Iowa ‍‍‍^{y}	12	–	6	.667	50	–	14	.781
Ohio State ‍‍‍	9	–	7	.563	32	–	17	.653
Wisconsin ‍‍‍^{y}	11	–	9	.550	31	–	24	.564
Penn State ‍‍‍^{y}	10	–	9	.526	36	–	23	.610
Purdue ‍‍‍	10	–	10	.500	34	–	24	.586
Michigan State ‍‍‍	7	–	9	.438	25	–	28	.472
Minnesota ‍‍‍	6	–	14	.300	25	–	27	.481
Illinois ‍‍‍	4	–	14	.222	24	–	26	.480
Indiana ‍‍‍	2	–	18	.100	13	–	41	.241
† – Conference champion ‡ – Tournament champion y – Invited to the NCAA tournament As of June 13, 2005; Rankings from NFCA

The 2005 Big Ten softball tournament was held at Alumni Field on the campus of the University of Michigan in Ann Arbor, Michigan, from May 12 through May 14, 2005. The championship game was aired on CSTV. As the tournament winner, Michigan earned the Big Ten Conference's automatic bid to the 2005 NCAA Division I softball tournament.

== Format and seeding ==
The 2005 tournament was an eight team single-elimination tournament. The top eight teams based on conference regular season winning percentage earned invites to the tournament.

== Tournament ==
Quarterfinals; May 12 and 13
2	Northwestern	2
7	Purdue	0
1	Michigan	6
8	Michigan State	2
3	Iowa	1
6	Penn State	0
5	Wisconsin	6
4	Ohio State	1

Semifinals; May 14
1	Michigan	10
5	Wisconsin	1
3	Iowa	2^{(8)}
2	Northwestern	1

Championship; May 14
1	Michigan	7
2	Iowa	2

== Schedule ==
Game	Time*	Matchup^{#}	Attendance
Quarterfinals – May 12 and 13
1	5:00 p.m.	#2 Northwestern vs. #7 Purdue	
2	7:30 p.m.	#1 Michigan vs. #8 Michigan State	1,203
3	12:00 p.m.	#3 Iowa vs. #6 Penn State	
4	2:30 p.m.	#5 Wisconsin vs. #4 Ohio State	
Semifinals – May 13 and 14
5	9:00 a.m.	#3 Iowa vs. #2 Northwestern	
6	11:45 a.m.	#1 Michigan vs. #5 Wisconsin	
Championship – May 14
7	2:30 p.m.	#1 Michigan vs. #3 Iowa	1,113
*Game times in EDT. # – Rankings denote tournament seed.

== All-Tournament Team ==
- Designated Player: Kristen Amegin (Northwestern)
- Designated Player: Ricci Robben (Wisconsin)
- Pitcher: Lisa Birocci (Iowa)
- Pitcher: Jennie Ritter (Michigan)
- Catcher: Becky Marx (Michigan)
- First base: Samantha Findlay (Michigan)
- Third base: Grace Leutele (Michigan)
- Shortstop: Stephanie Churchwell (Northwestern)
- Shortstop: Stacy May (Iowa)
- Outfielder: Alessandra Giampaolo (Michigan)
- Outfielder: Stephanie Bercaw (Michigan)
- Outfielder: Sheila McCorkle (Northwestern)

=== Tournament MVP ===
- Jessica Merchant (Michigan)
