= 2005 Arizona Wildcats softball team =

American college softball season

2005 Arizona Wildcats softball

NCAA Tucson Super Regional champion NCAA Tucson Regional champion Pac-10 champions

Women's College World Series, 1–2
- Conference: Pacific-10 Conference
- Record: 45–12 (13–8 Pac-10)
- Head coach: Mike Candrea (20th season)

2005 Pacific-10 Conference softball standings
	Conf.				Overall
Team	W		L	PCT	W		L	PCT
No. 4 Arizona ‍†‍‍^{y}	13	–	8	.619	45	–	12	.789
No. 6 California ‍†‍‍^{y}	13	–	8	.619	52	–	15	.776
No. 15 Oregon State ‍†‍‍^{y}	13	–	8	.619	43	–	16	.729
No. 10 Stanford ‍†‍‍^{y}	13	–	8	.619	43	–	16	.729
No. 2 UCLA ‍‍‍^{y}	11	–	10	.524	40	–	20	.667
No. 14 Washington ‍‍‍^{y}	10	–	11	.476	35	–	22	.614
No. 23 Oregon ‍‍‍^{y}	7	–	14	.333	36	–	25	.590
Arizona State ‍‍‍^{y}	4	–	17	.190	30	–	26	.536
† – Conference champion y – Invited to the NCAA tournament As of June 30, 2005; Rankings from NFCA/USA Today

The 2005 Arizona Wildcats softball team represented the University of Arizona in the 2005 NCAA Division I softball season. The Wildcats were coached by Mike Candrea, who led his twentieth season. The Wildcats finished with a record of 45–12. They competed in the Pacific-10 Conference, where they finished in a four-way tie for first with a 13–8 record.

The Wildcats were invited to the 2005 NCAA Division I softball tournament, where they won the Tucson Regional and Super Regional and advanced to the Women's College World Series. They finished tied for fifth place with a win against California and losses to semifinalists Tennessee and Texas.

== Personnel ==
=== Roster ===
2005 Arizona Wildcats roster
Pitchers: 17 - Leslie Wolfe - Junior; 44 - Alicia Hollowell - Junior; 99 - Taryne Mowatt - Freshman; Catchers: 11 - Cortney Nix - Sophomore; 15 - Callista Balko - Freshman	Infielders: 5 - Crystal Farley - Senior; 6 - Shelly Schultz - Junior; 9 - Jennifer Martinez - Senior; 29 - Kristie Fox - Sophomore; 55 - Betsy Wilson - Sophomore; 77 - Jackie Coburn - Senior	Outfielders: 00 - Autumn Champion - Junior; 4 - Adrienne Acton - Freshman; 12 - Allyson Von Liechtenstein - Senior; 20 - Candace Abrams - Senior; 22 - Courney Fossatti - Junior; 26 - Caitlin Lowe - Sophomore

=== Coaches ===
2005 Arizona Wildcats softball coaching staff
- Mike Candrea - Head coach - 20th season
- Larry Ray - Assistant coach - 14th season
- Nancy Evans - Assistant coach - 5th season

== Schedule ==
Legend
	Arizona win
	Arizona loss
*	Non-Conference game

2005 Arizona Wildcats softball game log
Regular season

February
Date	Opponent	Site/stadium	Score	Overall record	Pac-10 record
Feb 4	Tulsa*	Rita Hillenbrand Memorial Stadium • Tucson, AZ (Arizona Classic)	W 3–0	1–0	
Feb 4	Kansas*	Rita Hillenbrand Memorial Stadium • Tucson, AZ (Arizona Classic)	W 4–3	2–0	
Feb 5	Northwestern*	Rita Hillenbrand Memorial Stadium • Tucson, AZ (Arizona Classic)	W 4–3 ^{(8)}	3–0	
Feb 5	Oklahoma State*	Rita Hillenbrand Memorial Stadium • Tucson, AZ (Arizona Classic)	W 4–1	4–0	
Feb 6	New Mexico State*	Rita Hillenbrand Memorial Stadium • Tucson, AZ (Arizona Classic)	W 9–0 ^{(5)}	5–0	
Feb 13	vs Chattanooga*	Alberta B. Farrington Softball Stadium • Tempe, AZ (Kajikawa Classic)	W 8–0 ^{(5)}	6–0	
Feb 18	Marshall*	Rita Hillenbrand Memorial Stadium • Tucson, AZ (Wildcat Invitational)	W 7–0	7–0	
Feb 20	Hawaii*	Rita Hillenbrand Memorial Stadium • Tucson, AZ (Wildcat Invitational)	W 4–0	8–0	
Feb 20	Hawaii*	Rita Hillenbrand Memorial Stadium • Tucson, AZ (Wildcat Invitational)	W 2–1 ^{(8)}	9–0	
Feb 25	vs Sam Houston State*	Getterman Stadium • Waco, TX (Compass Bank Invitational)	W 1–0	10–0	
Feb 25	vs Birmingham–Southern*	Getterman Stadium • Waco, TX (Compass Bank Invitational)	W 8–3	11–0	
Feb 26	vs Louisiana Tech*	Getterman Stadium • Waco, TX (Compass Bank Invitational)	W 7–0	12–0	
Feb 27	at No. 11 Baylor*	Getterman Stadium • Waco, TX (Compass Bank Invitational)	W 1–0	13–0	

March
Date	Opponent	Site/stadium	Score	Overall record	Pac-10 record
Mar 4	Eastern Michigan*	Rita Hillenbrand Memorial Stadium • Tucson, AZ	W 15–0	14–0	
Mar 5	Eastern Michigan*	Rita Hillenbrand Memorial Stadium • Tucson, AZ	W 3–2	15–0	
Mar 11	at UNLV*	Eller Media Stadium • Paradise, NV (UNLV Tournament)	W 5–0	16–0	
Mar 12	vs Bowling Green*	Eller Media Stadium • Paradise, NV (UNLV Tournament)	W 3–0	17–0	
Mar 13	vs NC State*	Eller Media Stadium • Paradise, NV (UNLV Tournament)	W 12–3	18–0	
Mar 13	vs Miami (OH)*	Eller Media Stadium • Paradise, NV (UNLV Tournament)	W 6–1	19–0	
Mar 14	vs Long Island*	Eller Media Stadium • Paradise, NV (UNLV Tournament)	W 10–1 ^{(5)}	20–0	
Mar 16	vs Long Beach State*	Anderson Family Field • Fullerton, CA (Judi Garman Classic)	W 4–0	21–0	
Mar 17	vs No. 5 Texas*	Anderson Family Field • Fullerton, CA (Judi Garman Classic)	L 0–1 ^{(10)}	21–1	
Mar 18	vs No. 24 Florida State*	Anderson Family Field • Fullerton, CA (Judi Garman Classic)	W 6–0	22–1	
Mar 19	vs No. 8 Oklahoma*	Anderson Family Field • Fullerton, CA (Judi Garman Classic)	W 4–0	23–1	
Mar 20	vs No. 18 Fresno State*	Anderson Family Field • Fullerton, CA (Judi Garman Classic)	W 9–0 ^{(5)}	24–1	
Mar 20	vs No. 4 Michigan*	Anderson Family Field • Fullerton, CA (Judi Garman Classic)	L 2–6	24–2	
Mar 25	at No. 11 Louisiana–Lafayette*	Lamson Park • Lafayette, LA	W 2–0	25–2	
Mar 27	at No. 11 Louisiana–Lafayette*	Lamson Park • Lafayette, CA	W 10–3	26–2	

April
Date	Opponent	Site/stadium	Score	Overall record	Pac-10 record
Apr 1	No. 7 Stanford	Rita Hillenbrand Memorial Stadium • Tucson, AZ	W 4–2	27–2	1–0
Apr 2	No. 3 California	Rita Hillenbrand Memorial Stadium • Tucson, AZ	W 4–2	28–2	2–0
Apr 3	No. 3 California	Rita Hillenbrand Memorial Stadium • Tucson, AZ	L 3–6	28–3	2–1
Apr 6	at Arizona State	Alberta B. Farrington Softball Stadium • Tempe, AZ	W 1–0	29–3	3–1
Apr 8	No. 12 Oregon State	Rita Hillenbrand Memorial Stadium • Tucson, AZ	L 0–1	29–4	3–2
Apr 9	Oregon	Rita Hillenbrand Memorial Stadium • Tucson, AZ	W 8–1	30–4	4–2
Apr 10	Oregon	Rita Hillenbrand Memorial Stadium • Tucson, AZ	W 8–1	31–4	5–2
Apr 16	at No. 13 UCLA	Easton Stadium • Los Angeles, CA	L 1–9	31–5	5–3
Apr 17	at No. 13 UCLA	Easton Stadium • Los Angeles, CA]	L 4–5	31–6	5–4
Apr 22	No. 24 Arizona State	Rita Hillenbrand Memorial Stadium • Tucson, AZ	W 3–1	32–6	6–4
Apr 23	No. 24 Arizona State	Rita Hillenbrand Memorial Stadium • Tucson, AZ	W 10–3	33–6	7–4
Apr 29	Oregon	Rita Hillenbrand Memorial Stadium • Tucson, AZ	L 0–3	33–7	7–5
Apr 30	at No. 7 Oregon State	Oregon State Softball Complex • Corvallis, OR	W 9–0 ^{(5)}	34–7	8–5

May
Date	Opponent	Site/stadium	Score	Overall record	Pac-10 record
May 1	at No. 7 Oregon State	Oregon State Softball Complex • Corvallis, OR	L 0–4	34–8	8–6
May 6	at No. 12 UCLA	Easton Stadium • Los Angeles, CA	L 0–6	34–9	8–7
May 7	No. 22 Washington	Rita Hillenbrand Memorial Stadium • Tucson, AZ	W 3–0	35–9	9–7
May 7	No. 22 Washington	Rita Hillenbrand Memorial Stadium • Tucson, AZ	W 9–1 ^{(5)}	36–9	10–7
May 8	No. 22 Washington	Rita Hillenbrand Memorial Stadium • Tucson, AZ	W 4–3	37–9	11–7
May 12	at No. 2 California	Levine-Fricke Field • Berkeley, CA	L 0–1	37–10	11–8
May 13	at No. 5 Stanford	Boyd & Jill Smith Family Stadium • Stanford, CA	W 1–0	38–10	12–8
May 14	at No. 5 Stanford	Boyd & Jill Smith Family Stadium • Stanford, CA	W 3–2	39–10	13–8

Postseason

NCAA Tucson Regional
Date	Opponent	Site/stadium	Score	Overall record	NCAAT record
May 20	Lehigh	Rita Hillenbrand Memorial Stadium • Tucson, AZ	W 12–0 ^{(5)}	40–10	1–0
May 21	Oklahoma State	Rita Hillenbrand Memorial Stadium • Tucson, AZ	W 3–0	41–10	2–0
May 22	Oklahoma State	Rita Hillenbrand Memorial Stadium • Tucson, AZ	W 2–1 ^{(8)}	42–10	3–0

NCAA Tucson Super Regional
Date	Opponent	Site/stadium	Score	Overall record	NCAAT record
May 27	No. 14 Oklahoma	Rita Hillenbrand Memorial Stadium • Tucson, AZ	W 6–0	43–10	1–0
May 28	No. 14 Oklahoma	Rita Hillenbrand Memorial Stadium • Tucson, AZ	W 7–6	44–10	2–0

NCAA Women's College World Series
Date	Opponent	Site/stadium	Score	Overall record	WCWS Record
June 2	No. 11 Tennessee	ASA Hall of Fame Stadium • Oklahoma City, OK	L 0–1	44–11	0–1
June 4	No. 2 California	ASA Hall of Fame Stadium • Oklahoma City, OK	W 3–2 ^{(12)}	45–11	1–1
June 5	No. 4 Texas	ASA Hall of Fame Stadium • Oklahoma City, OK	L 0–1 ^{(11)}	45–12	1–2

== Ranking movements ==
Ranking movements Legend: ██ Increase in ranking ██ Decrease in ranking
	Week														
Poll	Pre	1	2	3	4	5	6	7	8	9	10	11	12	13	Final
NFCA/USA Today	3	2	2	1	1	1	2	2	2	2	4	2	3	3	4
