= 2005 UCLA Bruins softball team =

American college softball season

2005 UCLA Bruins softball

NCAA Regional No. 2 champion

Women's College World Series, runner-up
- Conference: Pacific-10 Conference
- Record: 40–20 (11–10 Pac-10)
- Head coach: Sue Enquist (17th season)
- Home stadium: Sunset Field

2005 Pacific-10 Conference softball standings
	Conf.				Overall
Team	W		L	PCT	W		L	PCT
No. 4 Arizona ‍†‍‍^{y}	13	–	8	.619	45	–	12	.789
No. 6 California ‍†‍‍^{y}	13	–	8	.619	52	–	15	.776
No. 15 Oregon State ‍†‍‍^{y}	13	–	8	.619	43	–	16	.729
No. 10 Stanford ‍†‍‍^{y}	13	–	8	.619	43	–	16	.729
No. 2 UCLA ‍‍‍^{y}	11	–	10	.524	40	–	20	.667
No. 14 Washington ‍‍‍^{y}	10	–	11	.476	35	–	22	.614
No. 23 Oregon ‍‍‍^{y}	7	–	14	.333	36	–	25	.590
Arizona State ‍‍‍^{y}	4	–	17	.190	30	–	26	.536
† – Conference champion y – Invited to the NCAA tournament As of June 30, 2005; Rankings from NFCA/USA Today

The 2005 UCLA Bruins softball team represented the University of California, Los Angeles in the 2005 NCAA Division I softball season. The Bruins were coached by Sue Enquist, in her seventeenth season as head coach. The Bruins played their home games at Easton Stadium and finished with a record of 40–20. They competed in the Pacific-10 Conference, where they finished fifth with a 11–10 record.

The Bruins were invited to the 2005 NCAA Division I softball tournament, where they swept the Regional and then completed a run to the title game of the Women's College World Series where they fell to champion Michigan.

== Personnel ==
=== Roster ===
2005 UCLA Bruins roster
Pitchers: - Lisa Dodd – sophomore; - Anjelica Selden – freshman; Catchers: - Jaisa Creps – sophomore; - Nicole Sandberg – senior; - Shana Stewart – sophomore; - Emily Zaplatosch – junior	Infielders: - Caitlin Benyi – junior; - Kristen Dedmon – sophomore; - Andrea Duran – junior; - Alissa Eno – junior; - Jodie Legaspi – sophomore; - Danielle Peterson – freshman; - Jennifer Schroeder – freshman	Outfielders: - Krista Colburn – freshman; - Tara Henry – sophomore; - Ashley Herrera – sophomore; - Whitney Holum – sophomore; Utility: - Danesha Adams – freshman

=== Coaches ===
2005 UCLA Bruins softball coaching staff
- Sue Enquist – Head coach – 17th season
- Kelly Inouye-Perez – Assistant coach – 12th season
- Lisa Fernandez – Assistant coach – 9th season

== Schedule ==
Legend
	UCLA win
	UCLA loss
*	Non-Conference game

2005 UCLA Bruins softball game log
Regular season

January/February
Date	Opponent	Site/stadium	Score	Overall record	Pac-10 record
Jan 30	at UC Santa Barbara*	Campus Diamond • Santa Barbara, CA	W 5–1	1–0	
Jan 30	at UC Santa Barbara*	Campus Diamond • Santa Barbara, CA	W 9–1	2–0	
Feb 2	vs UC Riverside*	Irvine, CA	W 3–0	3–0	
Feb 4	Georgia*	Easton Stadium • Los Angeles, CA	W 4–3^{8}	4–0	
Feb 4	Georgia*	Easton Stadium • Los Angeles, CA	W 7–0	5–0	
Feb 5	Cal State Fullerton*	Easton Stadium • Los Angeles, CA	L 3–4	5–1	
Feb 5	Georgia*	Easton Stadium • Los Angeles, CA	W 6–0	6–1	
Feb 6	Cal State Fullerton*	Easton Stadium • Los Angeles, CA	W 6–0	7–1	
Feb 13	vs Syracuse*	Alberta B. Farrington Softball Stadium • Tempe, AZ	L 1–2	7–2	
Feb 18	vs Georgia*	Poway, CA	W 2–0	8–2	
Feb 25	vs Bethune-Cookman*	Poway, CA	W 5–0	9–2	
Feb 25	vs Notre Dame*	Poway, CA	W 3–1	10–2	
Feb 26	vs Oklahoma State*	Poway, CA	L 1–2	10–3	
Feb 26	vs Wisconsin*	Poway, CA	W 2–0	11–3	
Feb 27	vs Texas*	Poway, CA	L 0–3^{8}	11–4	

March
Date	Opponent	Site/stadium	Score	Overall record	Pac-10 record
Mar 3	vs Kent State*	Margie Wright Diamond • Fresno, CA	W 4–1	12–4	
Mar 4	vs Ole Miss*	Margie Wright Diamond • Fresno, CA	L 2–3^{14}	12–5	
Mar 4	vs Iowa State*	Margie Wright Diamond • Fresno, CA	W 9–0^{5}	13–5	
Mar 5	vs St. John's*	Margie Wright Diamond • Fresno, CA	W 3–0	14–5	
Mar 6	vs Santa Clara*	Margie Wright Diamond • Fresno, CA	W 6–5	15–5	
Mar 6	at Fresno State*	Margie Wright Diamond • Fresno, CA	W 7–0	16–5	
Mar 15	Texas*	Easton Stadium • Los Angeles, CA	L 0–1^{8}	16–6	
Mar 17	Utah State*	Easton Stadium • Los Angeles, CA	W 8–0^{5}	17–6	
Mar 17	Utah State*	Easton Stadium • Los Angeles, CA	W 8–7	18–6	
Mar 29	at Cal State Fullerton*	Anderson Family Field • Fullerton, CA	W 8–0^{6}	19–6	

April
Date	Opponent	Site/stadium	Score	Overall record	Pac-10 record
Apr 1	at Oregon State	OSU Softball Complex • Corvallis, OR	L 1–2^{8}	19–7	0–1
Apr 2	at Oregon	Howe Field • Eugene, OR	L 1–3	19–8	0–2
Apr 2	at Oregon	Howe Field • Eugene, OR	L 1–2	19–9	0–3
Apr 9	at California	Levine-Fricke Field • Berkeley, CA	L 1–2	19–10	0–4
Apr 10	at California	Levine-Fricke Field • Berkeley, CA	W 2–1	20–10	1–4
Apr 15	Arizona State	Easton Stadium • Los Angeles, CA	W 4–0	21–10	2–4
Apr 16	Arizona	Easton Stadium • Los Angeles, CA	W 9–1^{6}	22–10	3–4
Apr 17	Arizona	Easton Stadium • Los Angeles, CA	W 5–4	23–10	4–4
Apr 22	Washington	Easton Stadium • Los Angeles, CA	W 4–3	24–10	5–4
Apr 23	Washington	Easton Stadium • Los Angeles, CA	L 1–2	24–11	5–5
Apr 27	at Washington	Husky Softball Stadium • Seattle, WA	L 2–3	24–12	5–6
Apr 29	California	Easton Stadium • Los Angeles, CA	L 2–3	24–13	5–7
Apr 30	Stanford	Easton Stadium • Los Angeles, CA	L 5–7	24–14	5–8

May
Date	Opponent	Site/stadium	Score	Overall record	Pac-10 record
May 1	Stanford	Easton Stadium • Los Angeles, CA	W 8–0^{5}	25–14	6–8
May 1	Stanford	Easton Stadium • Los Angeles, CA	L 3–5	25–15	6–9
May 6	at Arizona	Rita Hillenbrand Memorial Stadium • Tucson, AZ	W 6–0	26–15	7–9
May 7	at Arizona State	Alberta B. Farrington Softball Stadium • Tempe, AZ	W 6–1	27–15	8–9
May 8	at Arizona State	Alberta B. Farrington Softball Stadium • Tempe, AZ	W 8–0^{5}	28–15	9–9
May 12	Oregon	Easton Stadium • Los Angeles, CA	L 0–3	28–16	9–10
May 13	Oregon State	Easton Stadium • Los Angeles, CA	W 9–0^{5}	29–16	10–10
May 14	Oregon State	Easton Stadium • Los Angeles, CA	W 5–1	30–16	11–10

Postseason

NCAA Los Angeles Regional
Date	Opponent	Seed	Site/stadium	Score	Overall record	NCAAT record
May 20	(4) Loyola Marymount	(1)	Easton Stadium • Los Angeles, CA	W 6–1	31–16	1–0
May 21	Cal State Fullerton	(1)	Easton Stadium • Los Angeles, CA	L 1–2^{11}	31–17	1–1
May 21	UNLV	(1)	Easton Stadium • Los Angeles, CA	W 4–1	32–17	2–1
May 22	Cal State Fullerton	(1)	Easton Stadium • Los Angeles, CA	W 6–0	33–17	3–1
May 22	Cal State Fullerton	(1)	Easton Stadium • Los Angeles, CA	W 3–1	34–17	4–1

NCAA Los Angeles Super Regional
Date	Opponent	Seed	Site/stadium	Score	Overall record	NCAAT record
May 27	(10) Georgia	(7)	Easton Stadium • Los Angeles, CA	L 1–4	34–18	0–1
May 28	(10) Georgia	(7)	Easton Stadium • Los Angeles, CA	W 5–4	35–18	1–1
May 28	(10) Georgia	(7)	Easton Stadium • Los Angeles, CA	W 3–2	36–18	2–1

NCAA Women's College World Series
Date	Opponent	Seed	Site/stadium	Score	Overall record	WCWS Record
June 2	(2) California	(7)	ASA Hall of Fame Stadium • Oklahoma City, OK	W 2–1	37–18	1–0
June 3	(11) Tennessee	(7)	ASA Hall of Fame Stadium • Oklahoma City, OK	W 3–1	38–18	2–0
June 5	(4) Texas	(7)	ASA Hall of Fame Stadium • Oklahoma City, OK	W 4–0	39–18	3–0
June 6	(1) Michigan	(7)	ASA Hall of Fame Stadium • Oklahoma City, OK	W 5–0	40–18	4–0
June 7	(1) Michigan	(7)	ASA Hall of Fame Stadium • Oklahoma City, OK	L 2–5	40–19	4–1
June 8	(1) Michigan	(7)	ASA Hall of Fame Stadium • Oklahoma City, OK	L 1–4	40–20	4–2
