= Tiffany Haas =

American softball player (born 1983)

Personal information
- Born: October 11, 1983 (age 42) Santa Ana, California, U.S.
- Years active: 2003-2006

Sport
- Sport: Softball
- Position: Second base
- College team: Michigan Wolverines

Tiffany Ann Haas (born October 11, 1983) is a former American softball player. She played college softball for the Michigan Wolverines softball team from 2003 to 2006. She was the leading batter on the 2005 Michigan Wolverines softball team that won the 2005 Women's College World Series. She was also selected as a first-team NFCA All-American in 2005. She also played on the USA Elite Team that won the 2005 International Cup in Madrid.

== Early years ==
Born in Santa Ana, California. Haas was a star softball player at Foothill High School in North Tustin, California.

== University of Michigan ==
Haas committed to play softball at the University of Michigan in 2002 and enrolled in the fall of 2002. She played college softball under head coach Carol Hutchins from 2003 to 2006.

As a freshman in 2003, Haas was named to the NCAA Regional All-Tournament team.

As a sophomore in 2004, Haas was selected as a second-team NFCA All-American and a first-team NFCA All-Great Lakes Region player. She was also named the Most Valuable Player of the 2004 NCAA Regional Tournament.

As a junior in 2005, she was a member of the 2005 Michigan team that won the 2005 Women's College World Series. She led the 2005 championship team with a single-season Michigan record 91 hits and was named the Most Outstanding Player on the 2005 team. She was also selected that year as a first-team NFCA All-American. Known for her hitting, speed and "softball smarts," The Michigan Daily in 2005 called her "the quintessential leadoff hitter." Michigan coach Carol Hutchins called her "the best second baseman in the country."

After the 2005 collegiate season, Haas played on the USA Elite Team that won the 2005 International Cup in Madrid.

As a senior in 2006, she compiled a perfect 1.000 fielding percentage at second base and did not commit an error in her final 60 games for Michigan. She was selected for the third consecutive year as both the first-team All-Big Ten Conference second baseman and the first-team NFCA All-Great Lakes Region second baseman.

Haas remains one of Michigan's all-time career batting leaders with 199 runs scored (2nd), 866 at bats (2nd), 286 hits (3rd), 256 games played (3rd), 52 doubles (4th), and 48 stolen bases (6th). She also holds Michigan single-season records for at bats (253) and hits (91), both set during the 2005 championship season.
