= Jessica Merchant =

American softball player & coach (born 1983)

Current position
- Title: Associate head coach
- Team: Stanford
- Conference: Pac-12
- Record: 21–4 (.840)

Playing career
- 1998–2001: Wayland Union
- 2002–2005: Michigan
- 2005: New England Riptide
- 2006: Connecticut Brakettes
- 2007-2008: New England Riptide
- Position: Shortstop

Coaching career (HC unless noted)
- 2006: Michigan (volunteer asst.)
- 2007–2010: UMass (asst.)
- 2011-2017: Minnesota (asst.)
- 2018–2019: Stanford (asst.)
- 2020–present: Stanford (AHC)

Head coaching record
- Overall: 543–204–2 (.726)
- Tournaments: NCAA: 23–21 (.523)

Accomplishments and honors

Championships
- As coach: 4× Big Ten Tournament (2006, 2014, 2016, 2017); 4× Atlantic 10 Tournament (2007, 2008, 2009, 2010); Big Ten regular season (2017); 4× Atlantic 10 regular season (2007, 2008, 2009, 2010); As player: NCAA (Women's College World Series) Champion (2005); 3× NCAA Regional Champion (2002, 2004, 2005); 2× Big Ten Tournament (2002, 2005); 3× Big Ten regular season (2002, 2004, 2005)

Awards
- As player: Third-team NFCA All-American (2005); Second-team NFCA All-American (2004); 2× First-team NFCA Great Lakes All-Region (2003, 2004); Big Ten Player of the Year (2004); 5× Big Ten Player of the Week (2003-2005); First-team All-Big 10 (2004); Second-team All-Big 10 (2003, 2005); University of Michigan Athletic Academic Achievement Award (2004, 2005); Michigan Gatorade Player of the Year (2001)

Jessica Merchant (born 1983) is an American softball coach and former softball player. She is currently the associate head coach of the Stanford Cardinal softball team. She previously served as an assistant coach with the Minnesota Golden Gophers and UMass Minutewomen. She played professional softball in the National Pro Fastpitch (NPF) league for the New England Riptide for three seasons, and for the Connecticut Brakettes for one season. While playing for the Brakettes in 2006, she was named NPF Offensive Player of the Year.

Merchant also played college softball as a shortstop for the Michigan Wolverines softball team, from 2002 to 2005. She was the captain of the 2005 Michigan Wolverines softball team that won the 2005 Women's College World Series.

== Biography ==
=== Early years ===
Merchant was born in Wayland, Michigan. She attended Wayland Union High School beginning in the fall of 1997. Merchant earned 11 varsity letters playing for the Wayland Union Wildcats: four each in both basketball and softball, and three more in volleyball. Before graduating in 2001, she earned numerous athletic accolades, including being named the Michigan Gatorade Player of the Year in Softball, Detroit Free Press Scholar Athlete, and OK Gold Conference Athlete of the Year following her senior season. In softball, she was also selected to the All-State first team following both her junior and senior seasons. For each softball season that she played in high school, she was selected to both the OK Gold All-Conference first team and the All-County team. Merchant was also selected to the All-State second team in basketball by the Detroit Free Press following her senior season. While a student at Wayland Union, she also served as Student Council President, Vice President of the National Honor Society, and made the school's Honor Roll.

=== Collegiate years ===
She enrolled in the College of Literature, Science and the Arts at the University of Michigan in the fall of 2001. She played college softball for the Michigan Wolverines softball team under head coach Carol Hutchins from 2002 to 2005. As a freshman in 2002, she started all 61 games at shortstop. As a sophomore in 2003, she compiled a perfect 1.000 fielding average against conference opponents. As a junior in 2004, she was named Big Ten Player of the Year. As a senior, she was captain of Michigan's 2005 team that won the 2005 Women's College World Series, the school's first national championship in softball.

She was a second-team NFCA All-American in 2004, a third-team All-American in 2005, and a first-team NFCA All-Great Lakes Region player in 2003, 2004, and 2005. She was also named Big Ten Player of the Year (softball) in 2004.

After the 2005 season, Merchant played on the USA Elite Team that won the 2005 Intercontinental Cup in Madrid, Spain. She compiled a .500 batting average and eight RBIs at the International Cup and was named the Most Valuable Player of the tournament.

Merchant remains one of Michigan's all-time leaders in multiple categories, including games played - career (254 - 4th), doubles - career (48 - 6th), home runs - career (49 - 3rd), slugging percentage - career (.595 - 5th), runs - season (67 - tied for 2nd), home runs - season (21 - tied for 2nd), RBIs - season (63 - 5th).

=== Professional softball ===
Merchant was selected by the New England Riptide in the 2005 NPF Senior Draft. She played four years of professional softball in the NPF league. She played for the Riptide in 2005, 2007, and 2008, and for the Connecticut Brakettes in 2006. In 2006, she compiled a .354 batting average for the Brakettes with 12 home runs and 31 RBIs in 113 at bats. She was named NPF Offensive Player of the Year in 2006.

=== Coaching career ===
During the 2006 season, Merchant served as a volunteer coach at Michigan under Carol Hutchins. In September 2006, Merchant was hired as an assistant coach under Elaine Sortino at the University of Massachusetts. In four years at UMass, she helped guide the team to a 164-47-2, four Atlantic 10 championships, and four NCAA tournaments.

In August 2010, Merchant was hired as an assistant softball coach under Jessica Allister at the University of Minnesota. In her first year at Minnesota, the Golden Gophers nearly doubled their win total from the prior year. In 2012, she helped the infielders reach a fielding percentage of .971, the best fielding percentage for any infield in the Big Ten Conference. In her final season with the Gophers in 2017, the team had its best season in program history, compiling a record of 56-5 and winning the Big Ten regular season and tournament titles. Following the departure of Allister to Stanford that summer, it was announced in August that Merchant would join her staff there as an assistant coach.
