= 2005 Tennessee Lady Volunteers softball team =

American college softball season

2005 Tennessee Lady Volunteers softball
- Conference: Southeastern Conference
- East
- Record: 67–15 (20–8 SEC)
- Head coach: Ralph Weekly; Karen Weekly
- Assistant coach: Marty McDaniel; Mark Weekly
- Home stadium: Tyson Park

The 2005 Tennessee Lady Volunteers softball team was an American softball team, representing the University of Tennessee for the 2005 NCAA softball season. The team played their home games at Tyson Park. The team made it to the 2005 Women's College World Series, losing to Michigan in the semifinals. It marked the first time that the team made it to the Women's College World Series.

== Roster ==
2005 Tennessee Lady Volunteers roster
Pitchers: 5 Stacey Jennings – junior; 7 Monica Abbott – sophomore; 10 Megan Rhodes – freshman; Outfielders: 1 Ladonna Oliver – freshman; 3 Sarah Fekete – junior; 6 Katherine Card – junior; 23 India Chiles – sophomore	Catchers: 2 Brittany Bessho – sophomore; 13 Ashley Cline – freshman; 35 Shannon Doepking – freshman; Infielders: 8 Kenora Posey – freshman; 9 Caitlin Ryan – freshman; 22 Kortney Bell – freshman; 24 Kristi Durant – junior; 25 Natalie Brock – freshman; 33 Lindsay Schutzler – sophomore; 35 Tonya Callahan – freshman

== Schedule ==
Date	Time	Opponent	Rank^{#}	Site	Result	Attendance	Winning Pitcher	Losing Pitcher
February 4*	12:00 PM	UCF Knights	#13	Eddie C. Moore Field • Clearwater, FL	W 4-0	150	M. Abbott	L. Enders
February 4*	2:35 PM	DePaul Blue Demons	#13	Eddie C. Moore Field • Clearwater, FL	W 6-1	150	M. Rhodes	M. Huitink
February 5*	2:30 PM	Gardner-Webb Bulldogs	#13	Eddie C. Moore Field • Clearwater, FL	W 8-0^{(6)}	200	S. Jennings	S. Reichert
February 5*	5:10 PM	Florida A&M Rattlers	#13	Eddie C. Moore Field • Clearwater, FL	W 5-0	200	M. Abbott	D. Gordon
February 6*	10:55 AM	Louisville Cardinals	#13	Eddie C. Moore Field • Clearwater, FL	W 4-0	200	M. Abbott	A. Sherman
UNLV Desert Classic
February 12*	10:00 AM	#15 Baylor Bears	#9	Stephanie Craig Park • Las Vegas, NV	W 4-0	220	M. Rhodes	C. Vitek
February 12*	12:30 PM	#22 Nebraska Cornhuskers	#9	Stephanie Craig Park • Las Vegas, NV	W 5-0	250	M. Abbott	A. DeBuhr
February 13*	8:45 AM	#8 Washington Huskies	#9	Stephanie Craig Park • Las Vegas, NV	W 2-1	170	M. Abbott	A. Boek
Georgia Southern Eagles Tourney
February 18*	2:00 PM	UIC Flames	#7	Eagle Field • Statesboro, GA	W 2-0	75	M. Abbott	B. McIntyre
February 18*	5:30 PM	Charleston Southern Buccaneers	#7	Eagle Field • Statesboro, GA	W 9-0^{(5)}	75	M. Rhodes	A. Noble
February 19*	10:00 AM	Mercer Bears	#7	Eagle Field • Statesboro, GA	W 12-0^{(5)}	100	M. Rhodes	M. Weare
February 19*	12:15 PM	Georgia Southern Eagles	#7	Eagle Field • Statesboro, GA	W 5-0	188	M. Abbott	L. Free
February 20*	1:00 PM	UIC Flames	#7	Eagle Field • Statesboro, GA	W 8-0 ^{(5)}	86	M. Abbott	B. McIntyre
Palm Springs Classic
February 25*	1:00 PM	#20 Pacific Tigers	#5	Big League Dreams • Palm Springs, CA	W 14-0 ^{(5)}	188	M. Abbott	A. Jorgensen
February 25*	5:45 PM	#22 Oregon St. Beavers	#5	Big League Dreams • Palm Springs, CA	W 1-0	176	M. Abbott	B. McGowan
February 26*	12:40 PM	#23 Long Beach St.	#5	Big League Dreams • Palm Springs, CA	W 8-0	157	M. Abbott	M. Torres
February 26*	8:30 PM	#1 California Golden Bears	#5	Big League Dreams • Palm Springs, CA	L 3-7	212	K. Thorson	M. Rhodes
February 27*	9:00 AM	Notre Dame Fighting Irish	#5	Big League Dreams • Palm Springs, CA	L 2-5	220	S. Stenglein	M. Abbott
Charleston Southern Buccaneers Tourney
March 4*	12:00 PM	Providence Friars	#5	Gahagan Sports Complex • Charleston, SC	L 0-1	88	N. Bartholomew	M. Abbott
March 4*	2:00 PM	Northern Colorado Bears	#5	Gahagan Sports Complex • Charleston, SC	W 12-0^{(6)}	98	M. Rhodes	S. Miller
March 5*	10:00 AM	Morehead St. Eagles	#5	Gahagan Sports Complex • Charleston, SC	W 8-0 ^{(6)}	78	S. Jennings	K. Quinn
March 5*	12:00 PM	Furman Paladins	#5	Gahagan Sports Complex • Charleston, SC	W 11-0^{(5)}	92	M. Abbott	J. Mathis
March 5*	8:15 PM	North Carolina A&T Aggies	#5	Gahagan Sports Complex • Charleston, SC	W 19-0^{(5)}	68	M. Rhodes	L. Geiger
March 6*	10:30 AM	Longwood Lancers	#5	Gahagan Softball Complex • Charleston, SC	W 8-0^{(5)}	56	M. Abbott	R. Mills
March 6*	1:05 PM	College of Charleston Cougars	#5	Gahagan Softball Complex • Columbia, SC	W 4-0	120	M. Abbott	R. Stern
March 6*	3:35 PM	Villanova Wildcats	#5	Gahagan Softball Complex • Charleston, SC	W 4-0	89	M. Abbott	K. Haynes
March 8*	4:00 PM	Austin Peay Governors	#5	Tyson Park • Knoxville, TN	W 9-0^{(5)}	154	M. Abbott	L. Money-Gunn
March 8*	5:50 PM	Austin Peay Governors	#5	Tyson Park • Knoxville, TN	W 13-0^{(5)}	77	M. Rhodes	N. Anderson
March 9	4:00 PM	ETSU Buccaneers	#4	Tyson Park • Knoxville, TN	W 7-0	302	M. Abbott	C. Jenkins
March 9*	6:30 PM	ETSU Buccaneers	#4	Tyson Park • Knoxville, TN	W 3-0	302	M. Rhodes	B. Barrera
March 12	1:00 PM	#8 Alabama Crimson Tide	#4	Tyson Park • Knoxville, TN	W 3-1	624	M. Abbott	S. VanBrakle
March 12	3:30 PM	#8 Alabama Crimson Tide	#4	Tyson Park • Knoxville, TN	W 7-1	624	M. Abbott	J. Wright
March 13	1:00 PM	#8 Alabama Crimson Tide	#4	Tyson Park • Knoxville, TN	L 1-8	482	S. VanBrakle	M. Rhodes
March 15	4:00 PM	South Carolina Gamecocks	#4	Beckham Field • Columbia, SC	W 9-1^{(6)}	147	M. Abbott	A. Johnson
March 15	6:30 PM	South Carolina Gamecocks	#4	Beckham Field • Columbia, SC	W 12-0^{(5)}	147	M. Rhodes	K. Pouliot
March 16	4:00 PM	South Carolina Gamecocks	#4	Beckham Field • Columbia, SC	Canceled	-	-	-
March 19	1:00 PM	Mississippi St. Bulldogs	#4	Tyson Park • Knoxville, TN	W 1-0	410	M. Abbott	S. Comeaux
March 19	3:30 PM	Mississippi St. Bulldogs	#4	Tyson Park • Knoxville, TN	W 8-4	410	M. Abbott	M. Massey
March 20	1:00 PM	Mississippi St. Bulldogs	#4	Tyson Park • Knoxville, TN	W 3-1	369	M. Abbott	S. Comeaux
March 22*	1:30 PM	Liberty Flames	#5	LU Softball Field • Lynchburg, VA	W 8-1	85	M. Abbott	S. Swor
March 22*	4:10 PM	Liberty Flames	#5	LU Softball Field • Lynchburg, VA	W 12-0^{(5)}	85	M. Rhodes	T. Lowe
March 24*	3:00 PM	Virginia Cavaliers	#4	The Park • Charlottesville, VA	W 10-0	118	M. Abbott	C. Tolar
March 29	4:00 PM	Kentucky Wildcats	#4	Tyson Park • Knoxville, TN	W 5-0	378	M. Abbott	A. Kendall
March 29	6:30 PM	Kentucky Wildcats	#4	Tyson Park • Knoxville, TN	L 1-2^{(8)}	378	M. Cooper	M. Abbott
March 30	4:00 PM	Kentucky Wildcats	#4	Tyson Park • Knoxville, TN	W 3-1	260	M. Abbott	S. Allen
April 3	11:00 AM	Arkansas Razorbacks	#4	Tyson Park • Knoxville, TN	W 6-0	281	M. Abbott	K. Henry
April 3	1:30 PM	Arkansas Razorbacks	#4	Tyson Park • Knoxville, TN	W 2-1	281	M. Abbott	V. Lyons
April 5*	5:00 PM	Tennessee Tech Golden Eagles	#4	Tech Softball Field • Cookeville, TN	W 1-0	340	M. Abbott	B. Bynum
April 5*	7:30 PM	Tennessee Tech Golden Eagles	#4	Tech Softball Field • Cookeville, TN	W 3-0	340	M. Rhodes	S. Street
April 9	6:00 PM	#22 Auburn Tigers	#4	Jane B. Moore Field • Auburn, AL	W 5-0	609	M. Abbott	B. DiPietro
April 9	8:30 PM	#22 Auburn Tigers	#4	Jane B. Moore Field • Auburn, AL	L 1-3	609	H. Currie	M. Rhodes
April 10	12:00 PM	#22 Auburn Tigers	#4	Jane B. Moore Field • Auburn, AL	L 1-6	561	B. DiPietro	M. Abbott
April 16	1:00 PM	#15 Florida Gators	#6	KSP Stadium • Gainesville, FL	L 1-2	1,027	S. Stevens	M. Abbott
April 16	3:30 PM	#15 Florida Gators	#6	KSP Stadium • Gainesville, FL	L 0-1^{(8)}	1,027	S. Stevens	M. Abbott
April 17	1:00 PM	#15 Florida Gators	#6	KSP Stadium • Gainesville, FL	W 6-2	613	M. Abbott	S. Stevens
April 19*	2:30 PM	Austin Peay Governors	#6	Lady Govs Field • Clarksville, TN	W 4-0	150	M. Abbott	N. Anderson
April 19*	4:50 PM	Austin Peay Governors	#6	Lady Govs Field • Clarksville, TN	W 5-1	150	M. Rhodes	A. Porter
April 23	1:00 PM	#13 Georgia Bulldogs	#9	Tyson Park • Knoxville, TN	L 1-4	602	M. Green	M. Abbott
April 23	3:30 PM	#13 Georgia Bulldogs	#9	Tyson Park • Knoxville, TN	W 3-1	602	M. Abbott	K. Griffith
April 24	1:00 PM	#13 Georgia Bulldogs	#9	Tyson Park • Knoxville, TN	L 6-9	492	K. Carroll	M. Abbott
April 27*	1:00 PM	Marshall Thundering Herd	#11	Tyson Park • Knoxville, TN	W 3-0	196	M. Abbott	R. Nielsen
April 27*	4:00 PM	Marshall Thundering Herd	#11	Tyson Park • Knoxville, TN	W 5-1	196	M. Rhodes	A. Harter
April 30	3:00 PM	Ole Miss Rebels	#11	Ole Miss Softball Complex • Oxford, MS	W 4-0	133	M. Abbott	M. Callahan
April 30	5:20 PM	Ole Miss Rebels	#11	Ole Miss Softball Complex • Oxford, MS	W 3-1	133	M. Rhodes	D. Brill
May 1	1:00 PM	Ole Miss Rebels	#11	Ole Miss Softball Complex • Oxford, MS	W 9-0^{(5)}	142	M. Abbott	T. Willitt
May 7	1:00 PM	LSU Tigers	#10	Tiger Park • Baton Rouge, LA	W 1-0^{(9)}	1,020	M. Abbott	E. Turner
May 7	3:45 PM	LSU Tigers	#10	Tiger Park • Baton Rouge, LA	W 3-0	1,020	M. Rhodes	M. Jolly
May 8	1:00 PM	LSU Tigers	#10	Tiger Park • Baton Rouge, LA	W 2-0^{(9)}	620	M. Abbott	E. Turner
SEC Tournament
May 12	5:00 PM	#23 Florida Gators	#11	KSP Stadium • Gainesville, FL	W 4-0	-	M. Abbott	S. Stevens
May 13	2:00 PM	#8 Georgia Bulldogs	#11	KSP Stadium • Gainesville, FL	L 3-5	1,030	K. Carroll	M. Rhodes
May 14	11:00 AM	Mississippi St. Bulldogs	#11	KSP Stadium • Gainesville, FL	W 3-0	-	M. Abbott	S. Comeaux
May 14	5:00 PM	#9 Alabama Crimson Tide	#11	KSP Stadium • Gainesville, FL	W 3-1	-	M. Abbott	C. Owens
May 15	10:00 AM	#9 Alabama Crimson Tide	#11	KSP Stadium • Gainesville, FL	L 0-3	1,030	S. VanBrakle	M. Rhodes
NCAA Knoxville Regional
May 20	3:00 PM	Miami University RedHawks	#11	Tyson Park • Knoxville, TN	W 9-0^{(5)}	641	M. Abbott	J. Poggendorf
May 21	1:00 PM	College of Charleston Cougars	#11	Tyson Park • Knoxville, TN	W 4-0	-	M. Abbott	R. Stern
May 22	12:00 PM	College of Charleston Cougars	#11	Tyson Park • Knoxville, TN	W 2-0	-	M. Abbott	R. Stern
NCAA Stanford Super Regional
May 27	6:00 PM	#6 Stanford Cardinal	#11	Smith Family Stadium • Stanford, CA	W 2-0	1,068	M. Abbott	B. McCullough
May 28	1:00 PM	#6 Stanford Cardinal	#11	Smith Family Stadium • Stanford, CA	W 6-0	858	M. Abbott	B. McCullough
NCAA Women's College World Series
June 3	12:00 PM	#3 Arizona Wildcats	#11	ASA Hall of Fame Stadium • Oklahoma City, OK	W 1-0	-	M. Abbott	A. Hollowell
June 4	7:00 PM	#7 UCLA Bruins	#11	ASA Hall of Fame Stadium • Oklahoma City, OK	L 1-3	-	A. Selden	M. Abbott
June 5	4:00 PM	#12 Alabama Crimson Tide	#11	ASA Hall of Fame Stadium • Oklahoma City, OK	W 4-0	6,148	M. Abbott	J. Wright
June 5	9:45 PM	#1 Michigan Wolverines	#11	ASA Hall of Fame Stadium • Oklahoma City, OK	W 2-0^{(11)}	4,263	M. Abbott	J. Ritter
June 6	12:00 PM	#1 Michigan Wolverines	#11	ASA Hall of Fame Stadium • Oklahoma City, OK	L 2-3	2,431	J. Ritter	M. Abbott
*Non-Conference Game. ^{#}Rankings from NFCA released prior to game.All times are in Eastern Time Zone.
