= 2005 Michigan Wolverines softball team =

Sports team

2005 Michigan Wolverines softball

Women's College World Series Champions

Big Ten Regular Season Champions Big Ten Tournament Champions
- Conference: Big Ten Conference
- Record: 65–7 (15–2 B1G)
- Head coach: Carol Hutchins (21st season)
- Assistant coach: Bonnie Tholl
- Pitching coach: Jennifer Brundage (8th season)
- Home stadium: Alumni Field

2005 Big Ten Conference softball standings
	Conf.				Overall
Team	W		L	PCT	W		L	PCT
No. 1 Michigan ‍†‍‡‍^{y}	15	–	2	.882	65	–	7	.903
No. 16 Northwestern ‍‍‍^{y}	15	–	3	.833	42	–	18	.700
No. 24 Iowa ‍‍‍^{y}	12	–	6	.667	50	–	14	.781
Ohio State ‍‍‍	9	–	7	.563	32	–	17	.653
Wisconsin ‍‍‍^{y}	11	–	9	.550	31	–	24	.564
Penn State ‍‍‍^{y}	10	–	9	.526	36	–	23	.610
Purdue ‍‍‍	10	–	10	.500	34	–	24	.586
Michigan State ‍‍‍	7	–	9	.438	25	–	28	.472
Minnesota ‍‍‍	6	–	14	.300	25	–	27	.481
Illinois ‍‍‍	4	–	14	.222	24	–	26	.480
Indiana ‍‍‍	2	–	18	.100	13	–	41	.241
† – Conference champion ‡ – Tournament champion y – Invited to the NCAA tournament As of June 13, 2005; Rankings from NFCA/USA Today

The 2005 Michigan Wolverines softball team was an American college softball team that represented the University of Michigan during the 2005 NCAA softball season. The Wolverines, led by head coach Carol Hutchins in her twenty-first season, played their home games at Alumni Field in Ann Arbor, Michigan. The Wolverines finished the season with a 65–7 record, setting a program record for wins. They competed in the Big Ten Conference, where the team finished first with a 15–2 conference record.

They won the 2005 Big Ten Conference softball tournament and qualified for the NCAA Division I softball tournament, reaching the postseason for the eleventh consecutive year. They defeated UCLA in three games in the finals of the 2005 Women's College World Series to win their first championship in program history. They became the first team in the Big Ten to win the Women's College World Series, and the first team east of the Mississippi River to win the NCAA Division I Softball championship.

== Preseason ==
The Wolverines were ranked No. 8 in the nation according to the USA Today/NFCA and No. 12 in the ESPN.com/USA Softball preseason poll, becoming the top-ranked Big Ten school in both listings. Jessica Merchant and Nicole Motycka were both named to the USA Softball Collegiate Player of the Year preseason watch list.

== Personnel ==
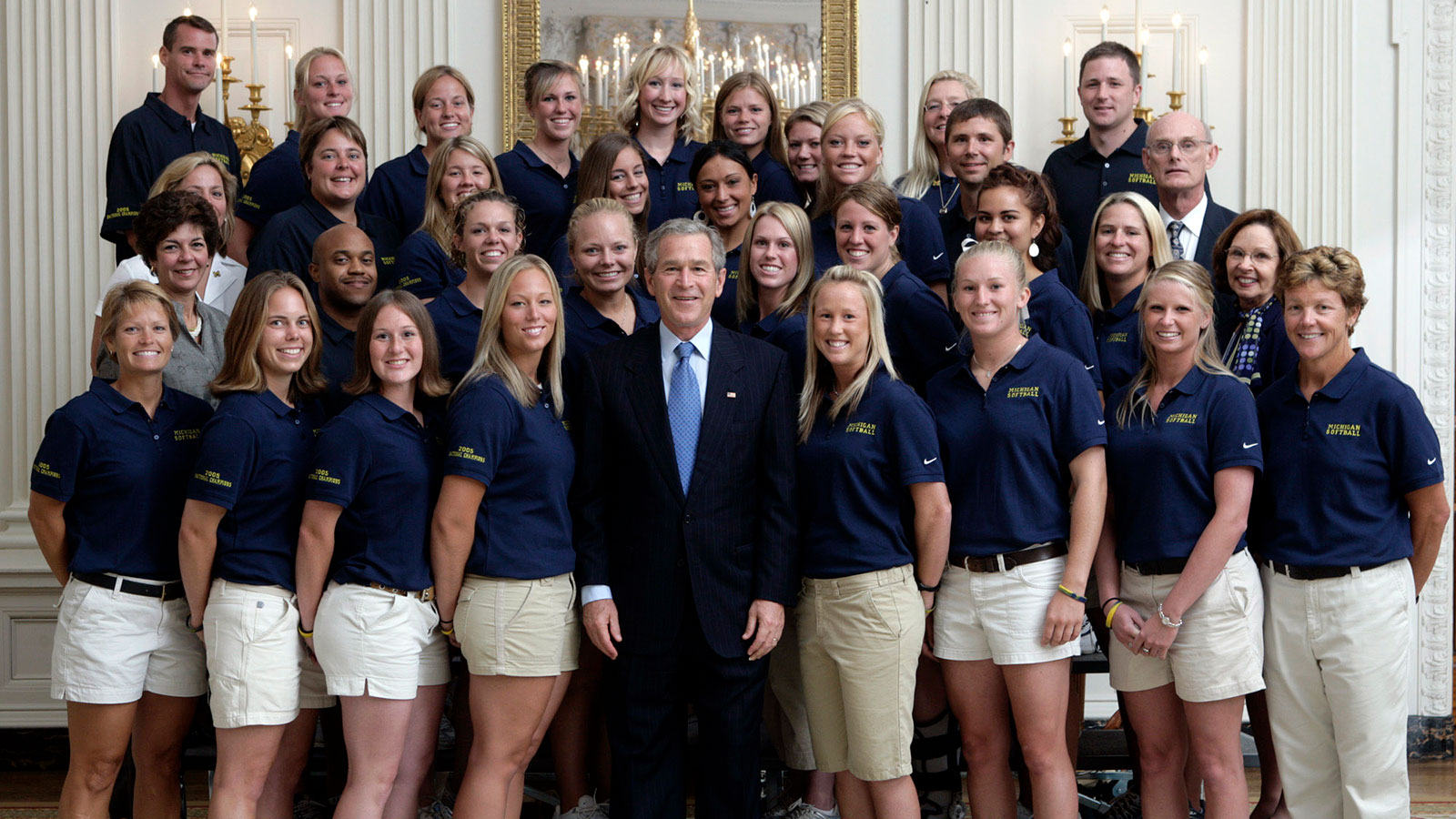
The 2005 Michigan Wolverines softball team in July 2005 visiting George W. Bush at the White House after winning the 2005 Women's College World Series.

=== Roster ===
2005 Michigan Wolverines roster
Pitchers: 1 Lorilyn Wilson – Sophomore; 15 Jennie Ritter – Junior; Outfielders: 8 Stepanie Bercaw – Junior; 10 Michelle Teschler – Senior; 17 Alessandra Giampaolo – Freshman; 21 Rebekah Milian – Sophomore; Utility: 4 Lauren Talbot – Freshman; 20 Nicole Motycka – Senior; 32 Angie Danis – Freshman	Catchers: 2 Jennifer Kreinbrink – Senior; 7 Tiffany Worthy – Sophomore; 14 Lauren Holland – Senior; 25 Becky Marx – Junior; Infielders: 11 Stephanie Winter – Sophomore; 12 Grace Leutele – Junior; 16 Samantha Findlay – Freshman; 22 Tiffany Haas – Junior; 23 Michelle Weatherdon – Freshman; 24 Jessica Merchant – Senior

=== Coaches ===
2005 Michigan Wolverines coaching staff
Carol Hutchins – Head coach – 21st year; Bonnie Tholl – Associate head coach – 3rd year; Jennifer Brundage – Assistant coach and pitching coach – 8th year; Jennifer Teague – Volunteer assistant coach – 1st year

== Schedule ==
2005 Michigan Wolverines Softball Game Log
Regular season
February

Date	Opponent	Rank	Stadium Site	Score	Win	Loss	Attendance	Overall Record	B1G Record
February 11	vs. Tennessee		Stephanie L.C. Park; Las Vegas, NV	Postponed					
February 11	vs. UCF		Stephanie L.C. Park	Postponed					
February 12	vs. Baylor	No. 8	Stephanie L.C. Park	6–7	Ferguson (4–0)	**Motycka** (0–1)	417	0–1	–
February 12	vs. UC Santa Barbara	No. 8	Stephanie L.C. Park	7–2	**Ritter** (1–0)	Sommer (0–1)	—	1–1	–
February 13	vs. Utah	No. 8	Stephanie L.C. Park	7–1	**Motycka** (1–1)	Nielsen (3–1)	87	2–1	–
February 13	vs. Oregon	No. 8	Stephanie L.C. Park	9–0 (5)	**Ritter** (2–0)	Cook (2–1)	—	3–1	–
February 18	vs. North Carolina State	No. 8	FAU Field; Boca Raton, FL	3–0	**Wilson** (1–0)	Sims (4–1)	—	4–1	–
February 18	vs. Pittsburgh	No. 8	FAU Field	3–0	**Ritter** (3–0)	Belardinelli (0–1)	—	5–1	–
February 19	vs. Rutgers	No. 8	FAU Field	8–0 (5)	**Motycka** (2–1)	Crosby (0–2)	120	6–1	–
February 19	vs. Florida Atlantic	No. 8	FAU Field	12–3 (6)	**Ritter** (4–0)	Freel (3–3)	128	7–1	–
February 20	vs. Florida Atlantic	No. 8	FAU Field	9–1 (5)	**Wilson** (3–0)	Freel (3–4)	119	8–1	–
February 25	vs. South Carolina	No. 8	South Commons; Columbus, GA	9–3	**Motycka** (3–1)	Pouliot (0–2)	—	9–1	–
February 25	vs. No. 13 Georgia Tech	No. 8	South Commons	4–1	**Ritter** (5–0)	Sallinger (8–1)	—	10–1	–
February 26	vs. Southern Illinois	No. 8	South Commons	3–0	**Wilson** (3–0)	Harre (1–4)	—	11–1	–
February 26	vs. Creighton	No. 8	South Commons	7–0	**Motycka** (4–1)	Nielsen (4–2)	—	12–1	–
February 27	vs. No. 21 Florida State	No. 8	South Commons	Postponed					
February 27	Championship Game	No. 8	South Commons	Postponed					

March

Date	Opponent	Rank	Stadium Site	Score	Win	Loss	Attendance	Overall Record	B1G Record
March 1	at No. 15 Florida	No. 8	Florida Softball Stadium; Gainesville, FL	4–0	**Ritter** (6–0)	Stevens (5–4)	—	13–1	–
March 1	at No. 15 Florida	No. 8	Florida Softball Stadium	4–1	**Wilson** (4–0)	Knowles (3–1)	—	14–1	–
March 2	at UCF	No. 8	UCF Softball Complex; Orlando, FL	4–1	**Ritter** (7–0)	Enders (6–6)	58	15–1	–
March 2	at UCF	No. 8	UCF Softball Complex	7–0	**Wilson** (5–0)	McIntyre (6–1)	78	16–1	–
March 4	vs. Tennessee Chattanooga	No. 7	USF Softball Field; Tampa, FL	2–1 (8)	**Wilson** (6–0)	Swarthout (5–5)	—	17–1	–
March 4	at South Florida	No. 7	USF Softball Field	9–0 (5)	**Ritter** (8–0)	Urbanik (5–4)	—	18–1	–
March 5	vs. Temple	No. 7	USF Softball Field	4–0	**Wilson** (7–0)	Nacianceno (0–1)	—	19–1	–
March 5	vs. No. 16 Florida	No. 7	USF Softball Field	6–2	**Ritter** (9–0)	Stevens (6–4)	—	20–1	–
March 6	vs. Pittsburgh	No. 7	USF Softball Field	9–0 (5)	**Wilson** (8–0)	Belardinelli (2–5)	—	21–1	–
March 17	at Cal State Fullerton	No. 5	Titans Softball Complex; Fullerton, CA	3–2	**Wilson** (9–0)	Weekley (1–1)	—	22–1	–
March 17	vs. No. 24 Fresno State	No. 5	Titans Softball Complex	6–0	**Ritter** (10–0)	Nesbitt (3–2)	—	23–1	–
March 18	vs. North Carolina	No. 5	Titans Softball Complex	5–0	**Wilson** (10–0)	Cox (7–8)	—	24–1	–
March 19	vs. DePaul	No. 5	Titans Softball Complex	1–0	**Ritter** (11–0)	Huitnik (3–7)	—	25–1	–
March 20	vs. No. 11 Texas	No. 4	Titans Softball Complex	7–0	**Wilson** (11–0)	Bradford (7–1)	—	26–1	–
March 20	vs. No. 1 Arizona	No. 5	Titans Softball Complex	6–2	**Ritter** (12–0)	Mowatt (7–1)	1,209	27–1	–
March 25	vs. Western Kentucky	No. 1	Ulmer Stadium; Louisville, KY	2–0	**Ritter** (13–0)	Schwartz (3–5)	272	28–1	–
March 25	vs. Middle Tennessee	No. 1	Ulmer Stadium	17–1 (5)	**Motycka** (5–1)	Dorais (0–2)	272	29–1	–
March 26	at Louisville	No. 1	Ulmer Stadium	2–1	**Wilson** (12–0)	Sherman (6–7)	—	30–1	–
March 26	at Louisville	No. 1	Ulmer Stadium	7–0	**Ritter** (14–0)	Bishop (10–5)	—	31–1	–
March 30	at Bowling Green	No. 1	BGSU Softball Field; Bowling Green, OH	6–0	**Wilson** (13–0)	Vrabel (6–8)	427	32–1	–

April

Date	Opponent	Rank	Stadium Site	Score	Win	Loss	Attendance	Overall Record	B1G Record
April 1	No. 24 Iowa	No. 1	Alumni Field; Ann Arbor, MI	2–5	Birocci (17–4)	**Wilson** (13–1)	1,237	32–2	0–1
April 2	No. 24 Iowa	No. 1	Alumni Field	3–1	**Ritter** (15–0)	Birocci (17–5)	485	33–2	1–1
April 3	Illinois	No. 1	Alumni Field	8–7	**Ritter** (16–0)	DeVreese (3–6)	—	34–2	2–1
April 3	Illinois	No. 1	Alumni Field	10–0 (5)	**Wilson** (14–1)	DeVreese (3–7)	783	35–2	3–1
April 6	at Central Michigan	No. 1	CMU Softball Complex; Mount Pleasant, MI	4–5	DeRoche (3–1)	**Wilson** (14–2)	—	35–3	3–1
April 6	at Central Michigan	No. 1	CMU Softball Complex	7–3	**Wilson** (15–2)	DeRoche (3–2)	—	36–3	3–1
April 8	at Wisconsin	No. 1	Goodman Diamond; Madison, WI	3–2 (8)	**Wilson** (16–2)	Brock (9–5)	—	37–3	4–1
April 9	at Wisconsin	No. 1	Goodman Diamond	8–0 (6)	**Wilson** (17–2)	Layne (2–5)	—	38–3	5–1
April 10	at Minnesota	No. 1	Jane Sage Cowles; Minneapolis, MN	4–0	**Ritter** (17–0)	Peyer (10–11)	—	39–3	6–1
April 10	at Minnesota	No. 1	Jane Sage Cowles	11–0 (5)	**Wilson** (18–2)	Peyer (10–12)	356	40–3	7–1
April 15	at Purdue	No. 1	Varsity SB Complex; West Lafayette, IN	3–0	**Ritter** (18–0)	Baker (13–10)	—	41–3	8–1
April 16	at Purdue	No. 1	Varsity SB Complex	6–2	**Ritter** (19–0)	LaRiva (9–3)	—	42–3	9–1
April 17	at Indiana	No. 1	IU Softball Complex; Bloomington, IN	9–0 (5)	**Ritter** (20–0)	Roark (9–16)	275	43–3	10–1
April 17	at Indiana	No. 1	IU Softball Complex	10–2 (6)	**Ritter** (21–0)	Bogado (1–7)	240	44–3	11–1
April 19	Eastern Michigan	No. 1	Alumni Field	5–1	**Wilson** (19–2)	Woodrum (6–7)	—	45–3	11–1
April 19	Eastern Michigan	No. 1	Alumni Field	14–2 (5)	**Ritter** (22–0)	Woodrum (6–8)	743	46–3	11–1
April 22	Penn State	No. 1	Alumni Field	1–2	Esparza (10–3)	**Ritter** (22–1)	515	46–4	11–2
April 23	Penn State	No. 1	Alumni Field	Postponed					
April 24	Ohio State	No. 1	Alumni Field	Postponed					
April 24	Ohio State	No. 1	Alumni Field	Postponed					

May

Date	Opponent	Rank	Stadium Site	Score	Win	Loss	Attendance	Overall Record	B1G Record
May 1	Michigan State	No. 1	Alumni Field	8–0 (5)	**Ritter** (23–1)	Turney (12–14)	1,903	47–4	12–2
May 1	Michigan State	No. 1	Alumni Field	9–1 (5)	**Ritter** (24–1)	Turney (12–15)	1,903	48–4	13–2
May 4	Western Michigan	No. 1	Alumni Field	2–0	**Wilson** (20–2)	VanDerSlik (10–14)	—	49–4	13–2
May 4	Western Michigan	No. 1	Alumni Field	5–0	**Ritter** (25–1)	Shumaker (4–1)	503	50–4	13–2
May 7	No. 19 Northwestern	No. 1	Alumni Field	3–0	**Ritter** (26–1)	Canney (18–6)	1,858	51–4	14–2
May 8	No. 19 Northwestern	No. 1	Alumni Field	8–7	**Wilson** (21–2)	Canney (18–7)	1,657	52–4	15–2

Postseason
B1G Tournament

Date	Opponent	Rank	Stadium Site	Score	Win	Loss	Attendance	Overall Record	B1GT Record
May 12	Michigan State (8)	No. 1 (1)	Alumni Field	6–2	**Ritter** (27–1)	Turney (14–16)	1,203	53–4	1–0
May 13	Wisconsin (5)	No. 1 (1)	Alumni Field	Postponed					
May 14	Wisconsin (5)	No. 1 (1)	Alumni Field	10–1 (5)	**Wilson** (22–2)	Brock (20–9)	—	54–4	2–0
May 14	No. 22 Iowa (3)	No. 1 (1)	Alumni Field	7–2	**Ritter** (28–1)	Arnold (20–5)	1,113	55–4	3–0

NCAA Regional

Date	Opponent	Rank	Stadium Site	Score	Win	Loss	Attendance	Overall Record	Regional Record
May 20	Canisius	No. 1 (1)	Alumni Field	8–1	**Ritter** (29–1)	Bunten (13–11)	1,837	56–4	1–0
May 21	Seton Hall	No. 1 (1)	Alumni Field	5–0	**Ritter** (30–1)	Meyer (27–6)	1,457	57–4	2–0
May 22	North Carolina	No. 1 (1)	Alumni Field	6–0	**Ritter** (31–1)	Cox (22–20)	1,046	58–4	3–0

NCAA Super Regional

Date	Opponent	Rank	Stadium Site	Score	Win	Loss	Attendance	Overall Record	Super Reg. Record
May 27	No. 21 Washington (16)	No. 1 (1)	Alumni Field	4–1	**Ritter** (32–1)	Boek (20–13)	2,311	59–4	1–0
May 28	No. 21 Washington (16)	No. 1 (1)	Alumni Field	2–3	Noble (15–8)	**Ritter** (32–2)	2,426	59–5	1–1
May 28	No. 21 Washington (16)	No. 1 (1)	Alumni Field	11–2 (6)	**Ritter** (33–2)	Boek (20–14)	2,426	60–5	2–1

Women's College World Series

Date	Opponent	Rank	Stadium Site	Score	Win	Loss	Attendance	Overall Record	CWS Record
June 2	vs. No. 23 DePaul	No. 1 (1)	ASA Hall of Fame Stadium; Oklahoma City, OK	3–0	**Ritter** (34–2)	Adix (23–9)	4,245	61–5	1–0
June 2	vs. No. 5 Texas (4)	No. 1 (1)	ASA Hall of Fame Stadium	4–0	**Ritter** (35–2)	Osterman (29–7)	4,560	62–5	2–0
June 5	vs. No. 11 Tennessee (11)	No. 1 (1)	ASA Hall of Fame Stadium	0–2 (11)	Abbott (50–8)	**Ritter** (35–3)	4,236	62–6	2–1
June 5	vs. No. 11 Tennessee (11)	No. 1 (1)	ASA Hall of Fame Stadium	3–2	**Ritter** (36–3)	Abbott (50–9)	2,431	63–6	3–1
June 6	vs. No. 12 UCLA (7)	No. 1 (1)	ASA Hall of Fame Stadium	0–5	Selden (29–12)	**Ritter** (36–4)	4,161	63–7	3–2
June 7	vs. No. 12 UCLA (7)	No. 1 (1)	ASA Hall of Fame Stadium	5–2	**Ritter** (37–4)	Selden (29–13)	4,161	64–7	4–2
June 8	vs. No. 12 UCLA (7)	No. 1 (1)	ASA Hall of Fame Stadium	4–1 (10)	**Ritter** (38–4)	Selden (29–14)	4,032	65–7	5–2

- Win
- Loss
- Postponement
- Bold: Wolverines team member
- Rankings from NFCA:
- (#) Tournament seedings in parentheses.

== Ranking movement ==
Poll	Last	Pre	Wk 1	Wk 2	Wk 3	Wk 4	Wk 5	Wk 6	Wk 7	Wk 8	Wk 9	Wk 10	Wk 11	Wk 12	Wk 13	Wk 14	Wk 15	Final
NFCA	9	8	8	8	8	7	6	5	1	1	1	1	1	1	1	1	1*	1*
* Indicates unanimous selection.

== Records and accomplishments ==
=== Individual records ===
==== Offense ====
- Most home runs in a season: 21 (Samantha Findlay and Jessica Merchant)
- Most hits in a season: 91 (Tiffany Haas)
- Most runs scored in a season: 67 (Jessica Merchant)
- Most RBI in a season: 77 (Samantha Findlay)
- Most at bats in a season: 253 (Tiffany Haas)
- Most home runs in a game: 3 (Samantha Findlay, April 17, 2005, tied with Nicole Motycka)
- Most runs in a game: 4 (Samantha Findlay, April 17, 2005, tied with seven other players)

==== Pitching ====
- Most appearances in a season: 48 (Jennie Ritter, tied with Kelly Holmes)
- Most starts in a season: 41 (Jennie Ritter, tied with Kelly Holmes)
- Most complete games in a season: 34 (Jennie Ritter)
- Most innings pitched in a season: 288 2/3 innings (Jennie Ritter)
- Most wins in a season: 38 (Jennie Ritter)
- Most strikeouts in a season: 417 (Jennie Ritter)
- Most no-hitters in a season: 3 (Jennie Ritter, tied with Vicki Morrow)

=== Team records ===
- Most wins in a season: 65
- Most consecutive wins: 32 (February 13, 2005 to March 30, 2005)

=== Accomplishments ===
- First victory over a top-ranked opponent (6–2 victory over No. 1 Arizona on March 20).
- First No. 1 national ranking (March 22).
- First No. 1 seed in the NCAA tournament.
- Samantha Findlay became the first freshman position player to be named Women's College World Series Most Outstanding Player.

== Awards and honors ==
Weekly Awards
Player	Award	Date Awarded	Ref.
Lorilyn Wilson	Big Ten Pitcher of the Week	February 22, 2005	
Jennie Ritter	Co-Big Ten Pitcher of the Week	March 8, 2005	
Lorilyn Wilson	Big Ten Pitcher of the Week	March 21, 2005	
Jessica Merchant	Big Ten Player of the Week	March 28, 2005	
Jennie Ritter	Co-Big Ten Pitcher of the Week	March 28, 2005	
Nicole Motycka	Co-Big Ten Player of the Week	April 4, 2005	
Lorilyn Wilson	Co-Big Ten Pitcher of the Week	April 11, 2005	
Jessica Merchant	NFCA National Player of the Week	April 13, 2005	
Jennie Ritter	Big Ten Pitcher of the Week	April 18, 2005	
Tiffany Haas	Big Ten Player of the Week	May 2, 2005	
Alessandra Giampaolo	Big Ten Player of the Week	May 9, 2005	

Individual Awards
Player	Award	Ref.
Jennie Ritter	Big Ten Pitcher of the Year; Big Ten Female Athlete of the Year; USA Softball Player of the Year	
Samantha Findlay	Big Ten Freshman of the Year	
Carol Hutchins	Big Ten Co-Coach of the Year	

All-Big Ten
Player	Selection	Ref.
Jennie Ritter	First Team	
Tiffany Haas	First Team	
Nicole Motycka	First Team	
Grace Leutele	First Team	
Alessandra Giampaolo	First Team	
Samantha Findlay	Second Team	
Jessica Merchant	Second Team	
Stephanie Bercaw	Third Team	

All-American
Player	Selection	Ref.
Jennie Ritter	First Team	
Tiffany Haas	First Team	
Jessica Merchant	Third Team	
Nicole Motycka	Third Team	
