= Jennie Ritter =

American softball player

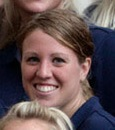
- Ritter at the White House in 2005

Personal information
- Born: June 1, 1984 (age 42) Dexter, Michigan, U.S.
- Education: Michigan
- Years active: 2003-2006
- Height: 5 ft 8 in (173 cm)

Sport
- Sport: Softball
- Position: Pitcher
Medal record
Pan American Games
Gold medal – first place	2007 Rio	Team competition
World Cup of Softball
Gold medal – first place	2007 Oklahoma City	Team competition

Jennifer Darlene Ritter (born June 1, 1984) is an American, former collegiate All-American, retired softball pitcher and current sports commentator. She played college softball and was a starting pitcher for the Michigan Wolverines softball from 2003 to 2006 and led them to the 2005 Women's College World Series championship. She is the career shutouts record holder for the Wolverines in the Big Ten Conference.

== Early life and college career ==
Ritter graduated from Dexter High School in Dexter, Michigan in 2002.

At the University of Michigan, Ritter played for the Michigan Wolverines softball team under head coach Carol Hutchins. Ritter saw limited playing time as a freshman in 2003, only getting 7 decisions for a 5–2 record. Debuting on February 15, 2003, Ritter got a no-decision, pitching 5-innings, giving up a run and striking out 9 vs. San Diego State Aztecs. She made her second appearance in the 2003 NCAA Regionals, shutting out Wright State Raiders for three innings to collect her last win that season.

In 2004, Ritter earned All-Big Ten honors after posting 24 wins and 269 strikeouts, of which the latter ranked second all-time for the Wolverines. Ritter fired her first career no-hitter on March 12 against the Notre Dame Fighting Irish. She was a hit batter away from a perfect game.

Ritter had a golden season as a junior in 2005, earning All-Big Ten and National Fastpitch Coaches' Association First Team All-American honors. She was named conference "Pitcher" and "Female Athlete of The Year" to go along with the University of Michigan's "Female Athlete of The Year." She threw three no-hitters and a perfect game on April 17, 2005, vs. the Indiana Hoosiers. She also broke and set the school records for wins and innings pitched. Her strikeouts and shutouts still rank top-5 all-time for a Wolverine season. She also earned a Big Ten pitching Triple Crown for the best win, strikeout and ERA totals.

From February 12 to April 19, Ritter went on a career best 22 consecutive game win streak, eventually snapped by the Penn State Nittany Lions on April 22. For the streak, she threw 151.2 innings and collected 73 hits, 19 earned runs, 22 walks and struck out 225 for a 0.88 ERA and 0.63 WHIP. Ritter defeated the No. 1 Arizona Wildcats on March 20, pitching 5-innings of the 6–2 victory. On May 4, Ritter punched out 16 of the Western Michigan Broncos in a two-hitter for her career single game regulation high.

Ritter would lead the Michigan Wolverines to the No. 1 seed at the Women's College World Series and opened her first and only appearance with a shutout of the DePaul Blue Demons. After escaping elimination, Ritter led the way into the Championship Finals against defending champs, the UCLA Bruins. Ritter toughed out a 10-inning battle in the third game of the finale series to win the National Championship and the distinction of being the first team east of the Mississippi River to accomplish the feat. She also earned All-Tournament Team honors for her 5–1 record and 60 strikeouts in 54-innings (then a new series record).

Ritter's senior season saw her repeat all-season honors: All-Big Ten, First Team All-American and Michigan "Female Athlete of The Year." She threw a no-hitter and broke her own record for strikeouts and strikeout ratio (11.6); her shutouts were also a new record, the strikeouts totals remains tops for a single season. Ritter also posted her best ERA and WHIP to accompany a pair of top-5 records for innings and wins at Michigan, helping to earn her a second conference Triple Crown.

On April 15 in a 1–0 loss to the Iowa Hawkeyes, Ritter struck out her 1,000th career batter. In a win over the Michigan State Spartans on May 6, Ritter began a career best 45.2 consecutive scoreless innings streak that was broken on May 21, when she broke the school record for single game strikeouts, whiffing a career best 19 in Regional action against the Oklahoma Sooners. During the streak, Ritter won all 8 games and struck out 76 batters, surrendering only 12 hits and 7 walks for a 0.42 WHIP.

Ritter ended her collegiate career as the all-time Michigan Wolverines record holder in strikeouts, shutouts, WHIP, innings pitched and strikeout ratio. As well she also put up some of the best wins and ERA numbers all-time for the Wolverines. She currently still holds the records for shutouts. For the Big Ten Conference she ranks top-10 in almost every other pitching category. Ritter is also a top-25 strikeout ratio pitcher all-time for a career in the NCAA Division I. Ritter graduated from the University of Michigan College of Engineering with a B.S.E. in industrial and operations engineering in 2007.

== Professional career ==
Ritter was selected to the National Team in 2007 and competed at the World Cup and Pan American games. She had previously been named to the USA Elite in 2005.

On February 15, 2006, Ritter was selected 6th overall in the National Pro Fastpitch draft by the Akron Racers. Ritter instead joined the PFX Tour where she was originally drafted fourth overall. In 2008, Ritter played professional softball in Japan and had labrum surgery at the end of the year before retiring from playing softball in the fall of 2010. Around this time, Ritter joined the Big Ten Network and ESPN as a color commentator for softball game broadcasts.

Since 2013, Ritter has lived in Louisville, Kentucky and worked in management for Louisville Slugger.

== Career statistics ==
YEAR	W	L	GP	GS	CG	SHO	SV	IP	H	R	ER	BB	SO	ERA	WHIP
2003	5	2	20	8	4	2	1	66.0	49	18	14	20	68	1.48	1.04
2004	24	8	41	31	20	8	2	207.2	118	41	35	45	269	1.18	0.78
2005	38	4	48	41	34	16	4	288.2	137	50	38	43	417	0.92	0.62
2006	31	8	42	35	32	17	1	272.2	129	41	30	39	451	0.77	0.61
TOTALS	98	22	151	115	90	43	8	835.0	433	150	117	147	1205	0.98	0.69

== See also ==
- NCAA Division I softball career strikeouts list
- NCAA Division I softball career sub-1.00 ERA list
