= 2005 NCAA Division I softball tournament =

- Teams: 64
- Finals site: ASA Hall of Fame Stadium; Oklahoma City, Oklahoma
- Champions: Michigan (1st title)
- Runner-up: UCLA (21st WCWS Appearance)
- Winning coach: Carol Hutchins (1st title)
- MOP: Samantha Findlay (Michigan)

The 2005 NCAA Division I softball tournament was the twenty-fourth annual tournament to determine the national champion of NCAA women's collegiate softball. Held during May and June 2005, sixty-four Division I college softball teams contested the championship. The tournament featured eight regionals of eight teams, each in a double elimination format. The 2005 Women's College World Series was held in Oklahoma City, Oklahoma from June 2 through June 8 and marked the conclusion of the 2005 NCAA Division I softball season. Michigan won their first championship by defeating UCLA two games to one in the championship series. Michigan first baseman Samantha Findlay was named Women's College World Series Most Outstanding Player.

== Regionals ==
=== Ann Arbor Super Regional ===
Round of 16	Quarterfinals
Michigan	8
Canisius	1
Michigan	5
Seton Hall	0
Seton Hall	1^{8}
North Carolina	0
Ann Arbor Regional - Alumni Field
Canisius	0
North Carolina	3
Seton Hall	1
North Carolina	2^{9}
Nebraska	4
Iowa	0
Nebraska	6
Washington	7
Washington	2^{11}
Creighton	1
Lincoln Regional - Bowlin Stadium
Iowa	2^{8}
Creighton	1
Nebraska	0
Iowa	1

Semifinals
Michigan	6	X
North Carolina	0	X
Washington	2	X
Iowa	0	X

Finals
Michigan	4	2	11^{6}
Washington	1	3	2

=== Chicago Super Regional ===
Round of 16	Quarterfinals
Notre Dame	3
Louisville	2
Notre Dame	3
Northwestern	2
Northwestern	6
Albany	1
Notre Dame Regional - Melissa Cook Stadium
Louisville	5
Albany	4
Northwestern	8
Louisville	2
Wisconsin	0
DePaul	6
DePaul	4
Green Bay	0
Oregon State	0
Green Bay	1
Madison Regional - Goodman Softball Complex
Wisconsin	2
Oregon State	8
Green Bay	0
Oregon State	5

Semifinals
Notre Dame	1	3
Northwestern	4	4
DePaul	0	8
Oregon State	7	6

Finals
Northwestern	0	3	X
DePaul	4	4	X

=== College Station Super Regional ===
Round of 16	Quarterfinals
Texas A&M	6
McNeese State	3
Texas A&M	3
Penn State	2
Penn State	5
Centenary	0
College Station Regional - Aggie Softball Complex
McNeese State	5
Centenary	2
Penn State	2
McNeese State	1
Alabama	9^{6}
Mississippi Valley State	1
Alabama	3
Arizona State	1
Arizona State	10^{5}
Hofstra	1
Tuscaloosa Regional - Rhoads Stadium
Mississippi Valley State	1
Hofstra	12^{5}
Arizona State	1
Hofstra	2

Semifinals
Texas A&M	9	X
Penn State	2	X
Alabama	6	X
Hofstra	0	X

Finals
Texas A&M	1	5	X
Alabama	4	6	X

=== Austin Super Regional ===
Round of 16	Quarterfinals
Florida	2
Bethune–Cookman	3
Bethune–Cookman	8
South Florida	4
South Florida	14^{5}
UCF	3
Gainesville Regional - Katie Seashole Pressly Softball Stadium
Florida	3
UCF	5
South Florida	5
UCF	4
Texas	1
UMass	0
Texas	2
Mississippi State	0
Mississippi State	1
Texas A&M–Corpus Christi	0
Austin Regional - Red and Charline McCombs Field
UMass	2
Texas A&M–Corpus Christi	6
Mississippi State	2^{8}
Texas A&M–Corpus Christi	1

Semifinals
Bethune–Cookman	5	X
South Florida	2	X
Texas	2	X
Mississippi State	0	X

Finals
Bethune–Cookman	0	1	X
Texas	1	6	X

=== Tucson Super Regional ===
Round of 16	Quarterfinals
Arizona	12^{5}
Lehigh	0
Arizona	3
Oklahoma State	0
Oklahoma State	6
Princeton	1
Tucson Regional - Rita Hillenbrand Memorial Stadium
Lehigh	1
Princeton	3
Oklahoma State	6
Princeton	3
Oklahoma	2
Wichita State	0
Oklahoma	6
Louisiana–Lafayette	3
Louisiana–Lafayette	7
Oregon	5
Norman Regional - Marita Hynes Field
Wichita State	2
Oregon	3^{8}
Louisiana–Lafayette	1
Oregon	3

Semifinals
Arizona	2^{8}	X
Oklahoma State	1	X
Oklahoma	2	X
Oregon	1	X

Finals
Arizona	6	7	X
Oklahoma	0	6	X

=== Stanford Super Regional ===
Round of 16	Quarterfinals
Tennessee	9
Miami (OH)	0
Tennessee	4
College of Charleston	0
College of Charleston	10
Virginia Tech	2
Knoxville Regional - Tyson Park
Miami (OH)	1
Virginia Tech	4
College of Charleston	6
Virginia Tech	3
Missouri	0
Southern Illinois	3
Southern Illinois	1
Stanford	9
Stanford	9
Robert Morris	0
Columbia Regional - Mizzou Softball Stadium
Missouri	9^{5}
Robert Morris	0
Southern Illinois	0
Missouri	9^{5}

Semifinals
Tennessee	2	X
College of Charleston	0	X
Stanford	3	X
Missouri	2	X

Finals
Tennessee	2	6	X
Stanford	0	0	X

=== Los Angeles Super Regional ===
Round of 16	Quarterfinals
UCLA	6
Loyola Marymount	1
UCLA	1
Cal State Fullerton	2^{11}
Cal State Fullerton	5
UNLV	4
Los Angeles Regional - Easton Stadium
Loyola Marymount	1
UNLV	6
UCLA	4
UNLV	1
Georgia	7
Tennessee Tech	3
Georgia	8
Georgia Tech	1
Georgia Tech	3
Kansas	1
Athens Regional - Jack Turner Stadium
Tennessee Tech	0
Kansas	4
Georgia Tech	5
Kansas	2

Semifinals
Cal State Fullerton	0	1
UCLA	6	3
Georgia	2	X
Georgia Tech	1	X

Finals
UCLA	1	5	3
Georgia	4	4	2

=== Waco Super Regional ===
Round of 16	Quarterfinals
Auburn	0
Florida State	5
Florida State	5
Baylor	9
Baylor	1
Florida A&M	0
Auburn Regional - Jane B. Moore Field
Auburn	11^{6}
Florida A&M	2
Florida State	2
Auburn	0
Fresno State	4
Long Beach State	0
Fresno State	3
BYU	0
BYU	3
California	1
Fresno Regional - Margie Wright Diamond
Long Beach State	3
California	4
BYU	0
California	9^{5}

Semifinals
Baylor	5	X
Florida State	3	X
Fresno State	1	0
California	3	1

Finals
Baylor	0	4	1
California	8^{6}	1	7

== Women's College World Series ==
=== Bracket ===
First round
3	Arizona	0
11	Tennessee	1
7	UCLA	2
2	California	1
3	Arizona	3
2	California	2
1	Michigan	3
DePaul	0
12	Alabama	0
4	Texas	3
DePaul	1
12	Alabama	2

Second round
11	Tennessee	1
7	UCLA	3
3	Arizona	0
4	Texas	1
1	Michigan	4
4	Texas	0
12	Alabama	0
11	Tennessee	4

Semifinals
7	UCLA	4	X
4	Texas	0	X
1	Michigan	0	3
11	Tennessee	2	2

Finals
7	UCLA	5	2	1
1	Michigan	0	5	4

==== Championship game ====
School	Top Batter	Stats.
Michigan	Samantha Findlay (1B)	3-5 4RBIs HR 2B
UCLA	Lisa Dodd (1B)	1-2 RBI HR 2BBs

School	Pitcher	IP	H	R	ER	BB	SO	AB	BF
Michigan	Jennie Ritter (W)	10.0	5	1	1	5	4	34	42
UCLA	Anjelica Selden (L)	10.0	9	4	1	2	10	39	41

=== All-Tournament Team ===
The following players were members of the All-Tournament Team.

- Monica Abbott, P, Tennessee
- Stephanie Bercaw, RF, Michigan
- Tonya Callahan, 1B, Tennessee
- Katherine Card, LF, Tennessee
- Krista Colburn, RF, UCLA
- Samantha Findlay, 1B, Michigan
- Jodie Legaspi, SS, UCLA
- Jessica Merchant, SS, Michigan
- Cat Osterman, P, Texas
- Jennie Ritter, P, Michigan
- Anjelica Selden, P, UCLA
- Emily Zaplatosch, C, UCLA
