= Samantha Findlay =

American softball player and coach

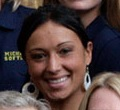
- Findlay at the White House in 2005

Biographical details
- Born: February 22, 1986 (age 40); Lockport, Illinois, U.S.

Playing career
- 2005–2008: Michigan
- 2008–2010: Chicago Bandits
- 2011: USSSA Pride
- Positions: First base, second base

Coaching career (HC unless noted)
- 2008–2009: DePaul (volunteer asst.)
- 2012–2013: DePaul (asst.)

Administrative career (AD unless noted)
- 2011: DePaul (director of operations)

Accomplishments and honors

Championships
- Women's College World Series (2005); Cowles Cup (2008)

Awards
- Women's College World Series Most Outstanding Player (2005); Big Ten Freshman of the Year (2005); 2× second-team All-Big Ten (2005, 2007); Third-team All-Big Ten (2006); First-team All-Big Ten (2008); First-team NFCA All-American (2008)

Samantha Jo Findlay (born February 22, 1986) is an American softball coach and former softball player. She is currently an assistant coach with the DePaul Blue Demons softball team. She previously played professional softball in the National Pro Fastpitch league (NPF) for the Chicago Bandits (2008–2010) and USSSA Pride (2011).

Findlay also played college softball for the Michigan Wolverines softball team from 2005 to 2008. She was selected as the Most Valuable Player in the 2005 Women's College World Series after hitting a three-run home run in the 10th inning of the championship game against UCLA. She was also selected as a first-team All-American at second base in 2007 and holds University of Michigan records for home runs in a career (62), RBIs in a career (219), career slugging percentage (.677), and RBIs in a season (77).

== Early years ==
Findlay was born in 1986 in Lockport, Illinois, 30 miles southwest of Chicago. She attended Lockport Township High School where she was an all-state softball player. She graduated in 2004.

== University of Michigan ==
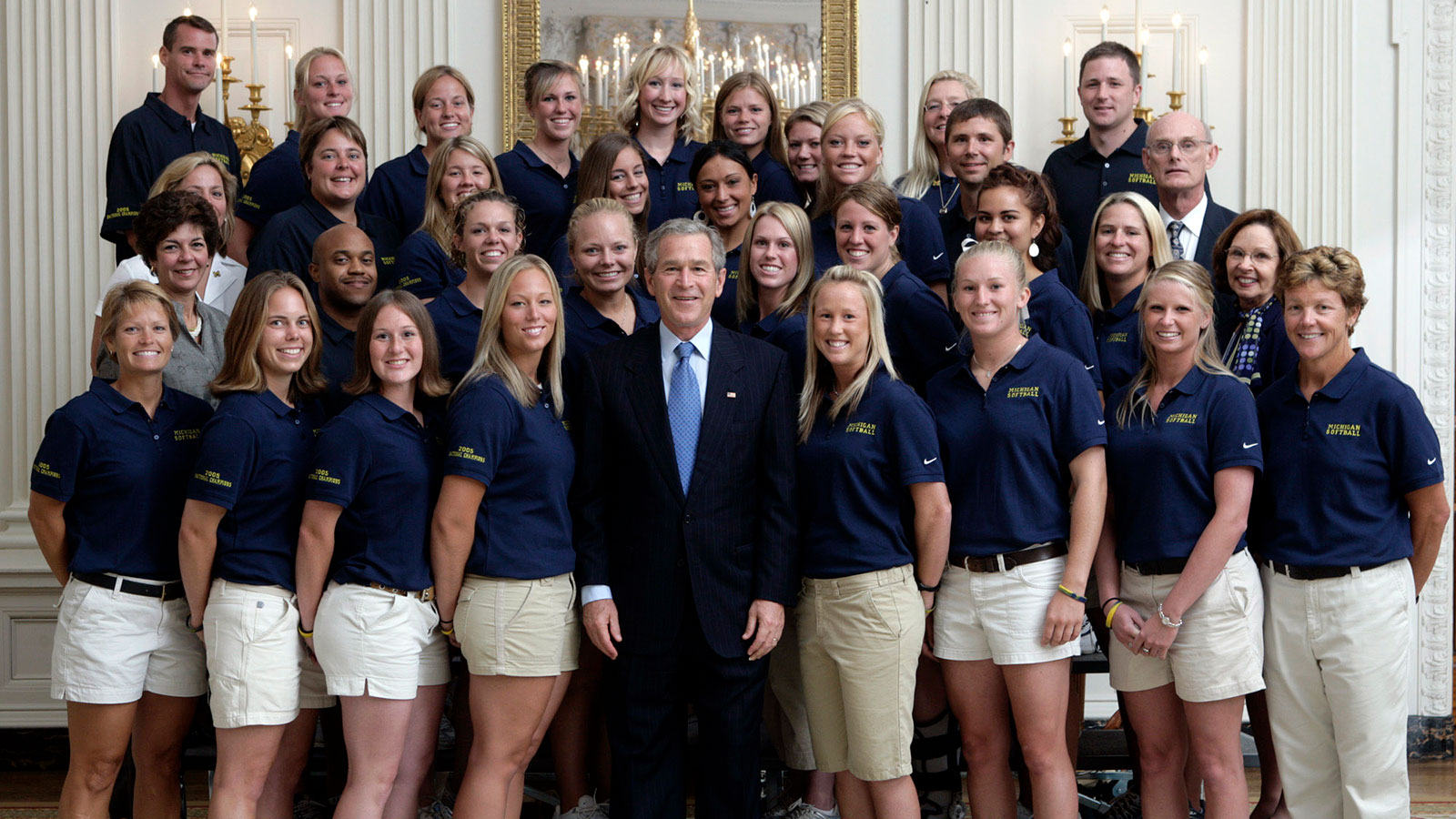
Findlay (third row, fifth from left) visits the White House with the Michigan softball team in July 2005, nearly a month after Michigan won the 2005 Women's College World Series.

Findlay enrolled at the University of Michigan in the fall of 2004. As a freshman in 2005, she hit .361, broke Michigan's single-season record with 77 RBIs, and tied the single-season record with 21 home runs. Following an outstanding season, she was named Big Ten Conference Freshman of the Year. On June 8, 2005, she drove in all four of Michigan's runs, including a three-run homer, in the 4–1 win over UCLA in the championship game of the 2005 Women's College World Series and won the Most Outstanding Player award of the tournament.

At the end of the 2005 season, Findlay played for Team USA in the 2005 Intercontinental Cup in Spain.

As a sophomore in 2006 and junior in 2007, Findlay started every game at first base for Michigan.

As a senior in 2008, Findlay moved from first to second base. She led the team with a .382 batting average and tied her own Michigan single-season records with 21 home runs, three grand slams and 69 RBIs. At the end of the 2008 season, she was selected as a first-team All-American at second base. She was also selected as the Most Outstanding Player on the 2008 Michigan softball team.

Findlay was also selected as first-team NFCA All-Great Lakes Region player in 2005 (first base), 2007 (first base), and 2008 (second base).

In four years playing for the Michigan softball team, Findlay played in 251 games for Michigan, all of them as a starter. She compiled a career batting average of .348. She holds Michigan career records with 62 home runs, 219 RBIs, and a .677 slugging percentage. She also holds Michigan's single-season record with 77 RBIs. She previously held the career record with 157 walks, but that record was bested by Dorian Shaw in 2011. She also previously held Michigan's single-season record with 21 home runs, but that record was broken in 2013 by Sierra Romero.

She was inducted in 2022 into the University of Michigan Athletic Hall of Honor.

== Professional playing career ==
From 2008 to 2010, Findlay played professional softball as a first baseman for the Chicago Bandits in National Pro Fastpitch, including the Bandits' 2008 Cowles Cup championship season. In three seasons with the Bandits, she had 31 home runs and 73 RBIs. She also played one season for the USSSA Pride. In February 2012, she announced her retirement from professional softball.

== Coaching career ==
In 2008, Findlay joined the coaching staff of the DePaul Blue Demons softball team as a volunteer coach. In August 2010, she was hired as DePaul's Director of Softball Operations. She was named as an assistant coach at DePaul in September 2011 and was on staff for the 2012 and 2013 seasons.

== Personal life ==
Findlay resides in Lockport, IL has two children, Logan and Annabelle. After leaving DePaul, Findlay became a human resources manager with a construction company Ozinga in Chicago.
