= 2024 Texas A&M–Commerce Lions softball team =

Texas A&M–Commerce Lions softball team

2024 Texas A&M–Commerce Lions softball
- Conference: Southland Conference
- Record: 9–45 (2–22 Southland)
- Head coach: Brittany Miller (2nd a season)
- Assistant coaches: Crystl Bustos; Avanna Williams
- Home stadium: John Cain Family Softball Complex

2024 Southland Conference softball standings
	Conf.				Overall
Team	W		L	PCT	W		L	PCT
McNeese ‍†‍‍	22	–	2	.917	40	–	20	.667
Southeastern Louisiana ‍‍‡‍^{y}	17	–	7	.708	47	–	15	.758
Nicholls ‍‍‍	16	–	8	.667	31	–	26	.544
Incarnate Word ‍‍‍	14	–	9	.609	34	–	17	.667
Lamar ‍‍‍	12	–	12	.500	26	–	25	.510
Texas A&M–Corpus Christi ‍‍‍	9	–	15	.375	21	–	22	.488
Houston Christian ‍‍‍	9	–	15	.375	23	–	27	.460
Northwestern State ‍‍‍	5	–	18	.217	19	–	31	.380
Texas A&M–Commerce* ‍‍‍	2	–	22	.083	9	–	45	.167
† – Conference champion ‡ – Tournament champion y – Invited to the NCAA tournament * Ineligible for the 2024 NCAA tournament due to transition from Division II; As of May 19, 2024; Rankings from NFCA/USA Today

The 2024 Texas A&M–Commerce Lions softball team represented Texas A&M University–Commerce during the 2024 NCAA Division I softball season as members of the Southland Conference. The Lions played their home games at John Cain Family Softball Complex and were led by second year head coach Brittany Miller. They compiled a 9–45 overall record and a 2–22 in conference play finishing the season in ninth place. The Lions failed to qualify for the SLC tournament.

== Previous season ==
The 2023 season was the program's inaugural season in the Southland Conference. The 2023 Lions team compiled a 9–39 overall and 5–19 conference record. They failed to qualify for the conference tournament.

== Preseason ==
=== Southland Conference Coaches Poll ===
The Southland Conference Coaches Poll was released on February 2, 2024. Texas A&M–Commerce was picked to finish ninth in the Southland Conference with 17 votes.

Coaches poll
Predicted finish	Team	Votes (1st place)
1	McNeese State	128 (16)
2	Southeastern Louisiana	114 (2)
3	Nicholls	97
4	Lamar	78
5	Texas A&M–Corpus Christi	72
6	Northwestern State	63
7	Houston Christian	49
8	Incarnate Word	30
9	Texas A&M–Commerce	17

=== Preseason All-Southland team ===
No Lions were named to the conference preseason teams.

==== First Team ====
- Lexi Johnson (SELA, SR, 1st Base)
- Erin Kraus (NICH, SO, 2nd Base)
- Haylie Savage HCU, JR, 3rd Base)
- Reese Reyna (MCNS, JR, Shortstop)
- Bailey Krolczyk (SELA, SR, Catcher)
- Chloe Gomez (MCNS, SR, Utility)
- Audrey Greely (SELA, SR, Designated Player)
- Alexa Poche (NICH, SR, Outfielder)
- AB Garcia (HCU, SO, Outfielder)
- Erin Ardoin (MCNS, JR, Outfielder)
- Ashley Vallejo (MCNS, JR, Pitcher)
- Primrose Aholelei (TAMUCC, JR, Pitcher)

==== Second Team ====
- Crislyne Mareno (MCNS, JR, 1st Base)
- Mariana Torres (MCNS, JR, 2nd Base)
- Rylie Bouvier (MCNS, JR, 3rd Base)
- Brooke Davis (LU, SR, Shortstop)
- Ashlyn Walker (NWST, SR, Catcher)
- Sydney Hoyt (TAMUCC, SR, Utility)
- Cameron Niedenthal (LU, SR, Designated Player)
- Cam Goodman (SELU, SR, Outfielder)
- Ka'Lyn Watson (SELU, SR, Outfielder)
- Laney Roos (NWST, SR, Outfielder)
- Maggie Darr (NWST, SR, Pitcher)
- Shaelyn Sanders (MCNS, SR, Pitcher)

== Roster ==
2024 Texas A&M–Commerce Lions softball team
Players
Coaches

#	Pos.	Name	Bats/throws	Height	Year	Home town
1	P	Destiny Martinez	R/R	5 ft 5 in (1.65 m)	Fr	Denver, Colorado
2	RHP	Emma Olsen	R/R	5 ft 4 in (1.63 m)	So	Elk Grove, California
3	OF	Ashley Diaz	R/R	5 ft 8 in (1.73 m)	Jr	Chino, California
6	INF	Emmie Miehe	R/R	5 ft 5 in (1.65 m)	So	Cameron Park, California
7	OF	Teyha Pitts	L/L	5 ft 3 in (1.6 m)	Fr	Denton, Texas
8	U	Diamond Sefe	R/R	5 ft 8 in (1.73 m)	So	Carson, California
9	INF	Charli Anger	R/R	5 ft 1 in (1.55 m)	Fr	Lubbock, Texas
10	INF	Stephanie Tapia	R/R	5 ft 7 in (1.7 m)	Jr	Yuma, Arizona
11	INF	Lencia Powell	R/R	5 ft 6 in (1.68 m)	Fr	North Richland Hills, Texas
12	OF	Ashlynn Griffith	L/R	5 ft 6 in (1.68 m)	Jr	Cedar Hill, Texas
13	RHP	Maddie Muller	R/R	5 ft 9 in (1.75 m)	So	Frisco, Texas
14	U	Kasey Kuyrkendall	S/R	5 ft 6 in (1.68 m)	So	Royse City, Texas
16	INF	Tatum Wright	R/R	5 ft 6 in (1.68 m)	So	Frisco, Texas
17	RHP	Annisa Arredondo	R/R	5 ft 4 in (1.63 m)	Sr	San Antonio, Texas
21	C	Darby Hickey	R/R	5 ft 9 in (1.75 m)	Jr	Plano, Texas
22	C	Shelby Hodge	L/R	5 ft 5 in (1.65 m)	So	Katy, Texas
23	INF	Jenna Joyce	R/R	5 ft 7 in (1.7 m)	Fr	Royse City, Texas
24	U	KK Cosek	L/L	5 ft 9 in (1.75 m)	Fr	Helendale, California
38	C	Elizabeth Guerrero	R/R	5 ft 5 in (1.65 m)	Jr	San Antonio, Texas
44	U	Isabella Arzola	R/R	5 ft 4 in (1.63 m)	Fr	Chino, California
55	U	Brooke Hilton	R/R	5 ft 4 in (1.63 m)	Fr	Plano, Texas
85	RHP	Julia Sanchez	R/R	5 ft 8 in (1.73 m)	Jr	Houston, Texas

Head coach

Britanny Miller (University of Iowa)

Assistant coach(es)

Crystl Bustos (Palm Beach Community College)
Avanna Williams (Texas A&M University–Commerce)

Legend

- (C) Team captain
- (S) Suspended
- (I) Ineligible
- Injured
- Current redshirt

Roster
Last update: February 1, 2024

== Schedule and results ==
Legend
	Texas A&M–Commerce win
	Texas A&M–Commerce loss
	Postponement/Cancellation
**Bold**	Texas A&M–Commerce team member

2023 Texas A&M–Commerce Lions softball game log
Regular season (9–45)

February (5–13)
Date	Opponent	Rank	Site/stadium	Score	Win	Loss	Save	TV	Attendance	Overall record	SLC record
Lion Classic
Feb. 9	UMass Lowell*		John Cain Family Softball Complex • Commerce, TX	13–3; 5 inn	**Muller, Maddie (1-0)**	LaCEDRA, Giana (0-1)	None	ESPN+	327	1–0	
Feb. 9	Stonehill*		John Cain Family Softball Complex • Commerce, TX	5–7	Skylar Brandemarte (1-0)	**Sanchez, Julia (0-1)**	None	ESPN+	267	1–1	
Feb. 10	Stonehill*		John Cain Family Softball Complex • Commerce, TX	6–1	**Muller, Maddie (1-0)**	Alex Sciaretto (0-1)	None		173	2–1	
Feb. 10	Quinnipiac*		John Cain Family Softball Complex • Commerce, TX	3–2	**Sanchez, Julia (1-1)**	Sydney Horan (0-1)	**Arredondo, Anissa (1)**		84	3–1	
Feb. 11	Stonehill*		John Cain Family Softball Complex • Commerce, TX	7–3	**Sanchez, Julia (2-1)**	Lauren Donovan (0-1)	None	ESPN+	116	4–1	
Feb. 11	vs. Texas Southern*		John Cain Family Softball Complex • Commerce, TX	2–4	Kristen Driver (1-0)	**Martinez, Destiny (0-1)**	Maren Berger (1)	ESPN+	124	4–2	
Tracy Beard Classic
Feb. 16	vs. Missouri*	15/14	Lovelace Stadium • Denton, TX	0–1	Harrison, Cierra (3-0)	**Sanchez, Julia (2-2)**	None			4–3	
Feb. 16	vs. South Dakota State*		Lovelace Stadium • Denton, TX	0–2	Akayla Barnard (2-0)	**Muller, Maddie (2-1)**	None			4–4	
Feb. 17	SIU Edwardsville*		John Cain Family Softball Complex • Commerce, TX	3–8	BAALMAN, Sydney (1-2)	**Martinez, Destiny (0-2)**	None	ESPN+	184	4–5	
Feb. 17	SIU Edwardsville*		John Cain Family Softball Complex • Commerce, TX	3–6	RAY, Kelsey (1-0)	**Muller, Maddie (2-2)**	PINDEL, Rylie (1)	ESPN+		4–6	
Feb. 18	SIU Edwardsville*		John Cain Family Softball Complex • Commerce, TX	4–8	RAY, Kelsey (2-0)	**Olsen, Emma (0-1)**	PINDEL, Rylie (2)	ESPN+	139	4–7	
Lion Invitational
Feb. 23	Omaha*		John Cain Family Softball Complex • Commerce, TX	0–7	Nuismer, Sydney (4-2)	**Muller, Maddie (3-2)**	None	ESPN+	116	4–8	
Feb. 23	South Dakota*		John Cain Family Softball Complex • Commerce, TX	3–2	**Sanchez, Julia (3-2)**	Clara Edwards (2-5)	None	ESPN+	148	5–8	
Feb. 24	South Dakota*		John Cain Family Softball Complex • Commerce, TX	1–4	Kori Wedeking (2-1)	**Muller, Maddie (2-4)**		ESPN+	189	5–9	
Feb. 24	Tarleton State*		John Cain Family Softball Complex • Commerce, TX	0–2 (8 inn)	Blincoe, Hannah (3-1)	**Sanchez, Julia (3-3)**	None	ESPN+	216	5–10	
Feb. 25	Abilene Christian*		John Cain Family Softball Complex • Commerce, TX	5–14	Neilsen, Talia (3-2)	**Martinez, Destiny (0-3)**		ESPN+	237	5–11	
Feb. 26	Abilene Christian*		John Cain Family Softball Complex • Commerce, TX	1–5	Russo, Lina (2-4)	**Sanchez, Julia (4-4)**	None	ESPN+		5–12	
Feb. 26	Abilene Christian*		John Cain Family Softball Complex • Commerce, TX	2–6	Beeman, Ella (2-2)	**Muller, Maddie (2-5)**	None	ESPN+	172	5–13	

March (1–20)
Date	Opponent	Rank	Site/stadium	Score	Win	Loss	Save	TV	Attendance	Overall record	SLC record
Mar 1	Houston*		John Cain Family Softball Complex • Commerce, TX	1–10 (5 inn)	Waiters, Tamya (3-2)	**Sanchez, Julia (4-5)**	None	ESPN+	324	5–14	
Mar 2	Houston*		John Cain Family Softball Complex • Commerce, TX	4–22 (5 inn)	Smith, Shelby (7-2)	**Muller, Maddie (2-6)**	None	ESPN+	172	5–15	
Mar 3	Houston*		John Cain Family Softball Complex • Commerce, TX	2–8	Lehman, Paris (4-0)	**Muller, Maddie (2-7)**	None	ESPN+	138	5–16	
Mar 6	at Oklahoma*	2	Love's Field • Norman, OK	0–9 (5 inn)	Deal, Kierston (4-0)	**Muller, Maddie (2-8)**	None		3,945	5–17	
Mar 8	at Texas A&M–Corpus Christi		Chapman Field • Corpus Christi, TX	0–1	Aholelei, Primrose (8-4)	**Arredondo, Anissa (0-1)**	None		150	5–18	0–1
Mar 8	at Texas A&M–Corpus Christi		Chapman Field • Corpus Christi, TX	3–10	Saenz, Ariella (2-1)	**Muller, Maddie (2-9)**	None		143	5–19	0–2
Mar 9	at Texas A&M–Corpus Christi		Chapman Field • Corpus Christi, TX	0–8 (5 inn)	Aholelei, Primrose (9-4)	**Arredondo, Anissa (0-2)**	None		208	5–20	0–3
Mar 12	at Sam Houston*		Bearkat Softball Complex • Huntsville, TX	2–8	Abigail Young (3-4)	**Arredondo, Anissa (0-3)**	None		285	5–21	
Mar 12	at Sam Houston*		Bearkat Softball Complex • Huntsville, TX	0–3	Amy Abke (4-3)	**Sanchez, Julia (3-6)**			300	5–22	
Mar 15	Southeastern Louisiana		John Cain Family Softball Complex • Commerce, TX	0–14 (5 inn)	Blanchard, Cera (8-1)	Arredondo, Anissa (0-4)	None	ESPN+		5–23	0–4
Mar 15	Southeastern Louisiana		John Cain Family Softball Complex • Commerce, TX	0–17 (5 inn)	DuBois, Ellie (6-2)	**Muller, Maddie (2-10)**	None	ESPN+	202	5–24	0–5
Mar 16	Southeastern Louisiana		John Cain Family Softball Complex • Commerce, TX	1–14 (5 inn)	Blanchard, Cera (9-1)	**Muller, Maddie (2-11)**	None	ESPN+	87	5–25	0–6
Mar 18	Arkansas*	20	John Cain Family Softball Complex • Commerce, TX	0–8 (5 inn)	Hannah Camenzind (7-0)	**Sanchez, Julia (3-7)**	None	ESPN+	356	5–26	
Mar 22	Lamar		John Cain Family Softball Complex • Commerce, TX	2–8	Wardlaw, Emma (8-2)	**Sanchez, Julia (3-8)**	None	ESPN+		5–27	0–7
Mar 22	Lamar		John Cain Family Softball Complex • Commerce, TX	0–10 (5 inn)	Mitchell, Karyana (9-1)	**Muller, Maddie (2-12)**	None	ESPN+	145	5–28	0–8
Mar 23	Lamar		John Cain Family Softball Complex • Commerce, TX	0–5	Wardlaw, Emma (8-2)	**Martinez, Destiny (1-4)**	Mitchell, Karyana (2)	ESPN+	219	5–29	0–9
Mar 26	Arkansas–Pine Bluff*		John Cain Family Softball Complex • Commerce, TX	14–6 (5 inn)	**Muller, Maddie (3-12)**	PRICE, Heidi (2-4)	None	ESPN+	136	6–29	
Mar 27	Arkansas–Pine Bluff*		John Cain Family Softball Complex • Commerce, TX	0–4	ADAMS, Kayla (8-4)	**Martinez, Destiny (0-5)**	None	ESPN+	54	6–30	
Mar 29	at Incarnate Word		H-E-B Field • San Antonio, TX	0–10 (5 inn)	Larissa Jacquez (5-3)	**Martinez, Destiny (0-6)**	None	ESPN+	73	6–31	0–10
Mar 30	at Incarnate Word		H-E-B Field • San Antonio, TX	1–9 (5 inn)	Portillo, S (5-3)	**Muller, Maddie (3-13)**	None	ESPN+	110	6–32	0–11
Mar 30	at Incarnate Word		H-E-B Field • San Antonio, TX	8–9 (12 inn)	Jacquez, L (6-4)	**Arredondo, Anissa (0-5)**	None	ESPN+	110	6–33	0–12

April (2–10)
Date	Opponent	Rank	Site/stadium	Score	Win	Loss	Save	TV	Attendance	Overall record	SLC record
Apr 1	UT Arlington*		John Cain Family Softball Complex • Commerce, TX	5–2	**Sanchez, Julia (4-8)**	Hoelscher, Emilie (0-2)	**Arredondo, Anissa (2)**	ESPN+	69	7–33	
Apr 5	at Nicholls		Swanner Field at Geo Surfaces Park • Thibodaux, LA	2–6	McNeill, Audrey (9-10)	**Sanchez, Julia (4-9)**	None	ESPN+	101	7–34	0–13
Apr 5	at Nicholls		Swanner Field at Geo Surfaces Park • Thibodaux, LA	2–4	Paden, Averi (6-2)	**Muller, Maddie (3-14)**	None	ESPN+	101	7–35	0–14
Apr 6	at Nicholls		Swanner Field at Geo Surfaces Park • Thibodaux, LA	0–8 (5 inn)	Yoo, Molly (6-5)	**Muller, Maddie (3-15)**	None		100	7–36	0–15
Apr 12	McNeese		John Cain Family Softball Complex • Commerce, TX	0–2	Sanders, Shaelyn (13-7)	**Sanchez, Julia (4-10)**	None	ESPN+		7–37	0–16
Apr 12	McNeese		John Cain Family Softball Complex • Commerce, TX	2–14 (5 inn)	Schexnayder, Ryann (6-3)	**Arredondo, Anissa (0-6)**	None	ESPN+	213	7–38	0–17
Apr 13	McNeese		John Cain Family Softball Complex • Commerce, TX	1–11 (5 inn)	Sanders, Shaelyn (14-7)	**Sanchez, Julia (4-11)**	None	ESPN+	127	7–39	0–18
Apr 16	North Texas*		John Cain Family Softball Complex • Commerce, TX	3–15 (5 inn)	McKenzie Wagoner (10-5)	**Sanchez, Julia (5-1)**	None	ESPN+		7–40	
Apr 16	North Texas*		John Cain Family Softball Complex • Commerce, TX	0–10 (6 inn)	Skylar Savage (6-8)	**Martinez, Destiny (0-7)**	None	ESPN+	184	7–41	
Apr 19	at Northwestern State		Lady Demon Diamond • Natchitoches, LA	2–1	**Sanchez, Julia (5-12)**	Seely, Kenzie (7-12)	None	ESPN+	389	8–41	1–18
Apr 19	at Northwestern State		Lady Demon Diamond • Natchitoches, LA	0–6	Darr, Maggie (6-13)	**Arredondo, Anissa (0-7)**	None	ESPN+	385	8–42	1–19
Apr 20	at Northwestern State		Lady Demon Diamond • Natchitoches, LA	2–3	Seely, Kenzie (8-12)	**Sanchez, Julia (5-13)**	None	ESPN+	226	8–43	1–20
Apr 25	at Texas A&M*		Davis Diamond • College Station, TX	–	(-)	**Cancelled**				–	

May (1–2)
Date	Opponent	Rank	Site/stadium	Score	Win	Loss	Save	TV	Attendance	Overall record	SLC record
May 3	Houston Christian		John Cain Family Softball Complex • Commerce, TX	3–1	**Sanchez, Julia (6-13)**	Prasifka, Addy (1-2)	None	ESPN+		9–43	2–20
May 3	Houston Christian		John Cain Family Softball Complex • Commerce, TX	4–7 (8 inn)	Swanson, Lyndie (8-7)	**Muller, Maddie (3-17)**	None	ESPN+	259	9–44	2–21
May 4	Houston Christian		John Cain Family Softball Complex • Commerce, TX	7–8 (8 inn)	Swanson, Lyndie (9-7)	**Arredondo, Anissa (0-8)**	None	ESPN+	183	9–45	2–22

Schedule source:*Rankings are based on the team's current ranking in the NFCA/USA Softball poll.

== Conference awards and honors ==
=== Post-season All-Southland Conference Teams ===
No Texas A&M–Commerce team members were selected to conference post season teams.

Player of the Year: Victoria Altamirano, UIW

Hitter of the Year: Ka'Lyn Watson, Southeastern

Pitcher of the Year: Shaelyn Sanders, McNeese

Freshman of the Year: Alexis Dibbley, McNeese

Newcomer of the Year: Shenita Tucker, Lamar

Coach of the Year: James Landreneau, McNeese

==== First Team ====
- Corine Poncho (MCNS, SO, 1st Base)
- Mariana Torres (MCNS, SR, 2nd Base)
- Chloe Magee (SELA, FR, Shortstop)
- Maddison Guillen (UIW, SR, 3rd Base)
- Bailey Krolczyk (SELA, SR, Catcher)
- Victoria Altamirano (UIW, SO, Utility)
- Audrey Greely (SELA, SR, Designated Player)
- Reagan Heflin (NICH, SO, Outfielder)
- Ka'Lyn Watson (SELA, SR, Outfielder)
- Alexis Dibbley (MCNS, FR, Outfielder)
- Cera Blanchard (SELA, SR, Pitcher)
- Shaelyn Sanders (MCNS, SR, Pitcher)

==== Second Team ====
- Lexi Johnson (SELA, SR, 1st Base)
- Ryleigh Mata (UIW, JR, 2nd Base)
- Baylee Lemons (UIW, JR, Shortstop)
- Rylie Bouvier (MCNS, JR, 3rd Base)
- Bella Perez (MCNS, FR, Catcher)
- Haylie Savage (HCU, JR, Utility)
- Crislyne Moreno (MCNS, JR, Designated Player)
- Jillian Guiterrez (UIW, SO, Outfield)
- Abby Andersen (NICH, SR, Outfield)
- Cam Goodman (SELA, SR, Outfield)
- Primrose Aholelei (TAMUCC, SR, Pitcher)
- Ellie DuBois (SELA, SR, Pitcher)
