= 2024 Nicholls Colonels softball team =

American college softball season

2024 Nicholls Colonels softball
- Conference: Southland Conference
- Record: 31–26 (16–8 Southland)
- Head coach: Justin Lewis (3rd season)
- Assistant coaches: Ron Frost; Kat Frakes
- Home stadium: Swanner Field at Geo Surfaces Park

2024 Southland Conference softball standings
	Conf.				Overall
Team	W		L	PCT	W		L	PCT
McNeese ‍†‍‍	22	–	2	.917	40	–	20	.667
Southeastern Louisiana ‍‍‡‍^{y}	17	–	7	.708	47	–	15	.758
Nicholls ‍‍‍	16	–	8	.667	31	–	26	.544
Incarnate Word ‍‍‍	14	–	9	.609	34	–	17	.667
Lamar ‍‍‍	12	–	12	.500	26	–	25	.510
Texas A&M–Corpus Christi ‍‍‍	9	–	15	.375	21	–	22	.488
Houston Christian ‍‍‍	9	–	15	.375	23	–	27	.460
Northwestern State ‍‍‍	5	–	18	.217	19	–	31	.380
Texas A&M–Commerce* ‍‍‍	2	–	22	.083	9	–	45	.167
† – Conference champion ‡ – Tournament champion y – Invited to the NCAA tournament * Ineligible for the 2024 NCAA tournament due to transition from Division II; As of May 19, 2024; Rankings from NFCA/USA Today

The 2024 Nicholls Colonels softball team represented Nicholls State University during the 2024 NCAA Division I softball season. The Colonels played their home games at Swanner Field at Geo Surfaces Park and were led by third-year head coach Justin Lewis. They are members of the Southland Conference. The team compiled a 31–26 overall record and a 16–8 record in conference play finishing in third place. As the third seeded team in the SLC tournament, the Colonels were 2–2 defeating seventh seeded Houston Christian 5–4 and fifth seeded Lamar 5–4^{8}. They were defeated by second seeded Southeastern Louisiana 1–4 and first seeded McNeese 3–4^{8}.

== Preseason ==
=== Southland Conference Coaches Poll ===
The Southland Conference Coaches Poll was released on February 2, 2024. Nicholls was picked to finish third in the Southland Conference with 97 votes.

Coaches poll
Predicted finish	Team	Votes (1st place)
1	McNeese State	128 (16)
2	Southeastern Louisiana	114 (2)
3	Nicholls	97
4	Lamar	78
5	Texas A&M–Corpus Christi	72
6	Northwestern State	63
7	Houston Christian	49
8	Incarnate Word	30
9	Texas A&M–Commerce	17

=== Preseason All-Southland team ===
Erin Kraus and Alexa Poche were named to the conference preseason first team.

==== First Team ====
- Lexi Johnson (SELA, SR, 1st Base)
- Erin Kraus (NICH, SO, 2nd Base)
- Haylie Savage (HCU, JR, 3rd Base)
- Reese Reyna (MCNS, JR, Shortstop)
- Bailey Krolczyk (SELA, SR, Catcher)
- Chloe Gomez (MCNS, SR, Utility)
- Audrey Greely (SELA, SR, Designated Player)
- Alexa Poche (NICH, SR, Outfielder)
- AB Garcia (HCU, SO, Outfielder)
- Erin Ardoin (MCNS, JR, Outfielder)
- Ashley Vallejo (MCNS, JR, Pitcher)
- Primrose Aholelei (TAMUCC, JR, Pitcher)

==== Second Team ====
- Crislyne Mareno (MCNS, JR, 1st Base)
- Mariana Torres (MCNS, JR, 2nd Base)
- Rylie Bouvier (MCNS, JR, 3rd Base)
- Brooke Davis (LU, SR, Shortstop)
- Ashlyn Walker (NWST, SR, Catcher)
- Sydney Hoyt (TAMUCC, SR, Utility)
- Cameron Niedenthal (LU, SR, Designated Player)
- Cam Goodman (SELU, SR, Outfielder)
- Ka'Lyn Watson (SELU, SR, Outfielder)
- Laney Roos (NWST, SR, Outfielder)
- Maggie Darr (NWST, SR, Pitcher)
- Shaelyn Sanders (MCNS, SR, Pitcher)

== Roster ==
2024 Nicholls Colonels softball team
Players
Coaches

#	Pos.	Name	Bats/throws	Height	Year	Home town
1		Madisen Levsey	/	—	Fr
2	OF	McKenzie Champagne	L/R	5 ft 4 in (1.63 m)	Jr	Lockport, Louisiana
3	U	Claire Cisco	L/R	5 ft 4 in (1.63 m)	So	College Station, Texas
4	INF	Makynli Miller	R/R	5 ft 6 in (1.68 m)	Fr	Many, Louisiana
5	INF	Erin Krause	L/R	5 ft 7 in (1.7 m)	So	Cypress, Texas
7	RHP	Molly VandenBout	R/R	5 ft 10 in (1.78 m)	Jr	Temple, Texas
8		Sydney Mann	/	—	Fr
9	INF	Alexa Poche'	L/L	5 ft 8 in (1.73 m)	Sr	New Orleans, Louisiana
10		Madisen Fulfer	/	—	Fr
11		Laylin Sturm	/	—	Fr
12		Rylie Rutherford	/	—	Fr
13		Katy Sanders	/	—	Fr
14	RHP	Audrey McNeil	R/R	5 ft 7 in (1.7 m)	Sr	Plano, Texas
15	INF	Lilianna Robledo	R/R	5 ft 5 in (1.65 m)	So	Converse, Texas
16	OF	Reagan Heflin	L/R	5 ft 8 in (1.73 m)	So	Richmond, Texas
17		Gabee Higbe	/	—	So
18	INF	Sydni Stevens	R/R	5 ft 9 in (1.75 m)	Fr	Seguin, Texas
19	OF	Samantha Gwiazda	R/R	5 ft 9 in (1.75 m)	Sr	Frankfort, Illinois
20	OF	Carmella Muccilli	R/R	5 ft 8 in (1.73 m)	So	Santa Cruz, California
21	INF	Sydnee Shelton	R/R	5 ft 9 in (1.75 m)	Sr	Fort Worth, Texas
22	LHP	Molly Yoo	L/L	5 ft 8 in (1.73 m)	So	Cypress, Texas
23		Taylor Efferson	/	—	Fr
24	RHP	Averi Paden	R/L	5 ft 5 in (1.65 m)	So	Summit, Mississippi
25		Alyssa Naquin	/	—	Fr
26	C	Brynne Songy	R/R	5 ft 4 in (1.63 m)	So	Prairieville, Louisiana
42	P	Abigail Anderson	R/R	5 ft 10 in (1.78 m)	Sr	Mesa, Arizona

Head coach

Justin Lewis (Louisiana–Monroe)

Assistant coach(es)

Ron Frost (Alabama State)
Kat Frakes (UIS)

Legend

- (C) Team captain
- (S) Suspended
- (I) Ineligible
- Injured
- Current redshirt

Roster
Last update: January 26, 2024

== Schedule and results ==
Legend
	Nicholls win
	Nicholls loss
	Postponement/Cancellation
**Bold**	Nicholls team member

2024 Nicholls State Colonels softball game log
Regular season (31–26)

February (11–8)
Date	Opponent	Rank	Site/stadium	Score	Win	Loss	Save	TV	Attendance	Overall record	SLC record
Feb. 8	at LSU*		Tiger Park • Baton Rouge, LA	0–8; 5 inn	Sydney Berzon (1–0)	**McNeill, Audrey (0–1)**	None	SECN+/ESPN+	1,850	0–1	
Mardi Gras Mambo
Feb. 9	vs. Green Bay*		Youngsville Sports Complex • Youngsville, LA	11–1; 5 inn	**McNeill, Audrey (1-1)**	P. Kringel (0–2)	None		60	1–1	
Feb. 9	vs. North Dakota*		Youngsville Sports Complex • Youngsville, LA	2–4	Makaela Carr (1–0)	**Yoo, Molly (0–1)**)	None		101	1–2	
Feb. 10	vs. Providence*		Youngsville Sports Complex • Youngsville, LA	6–1	**McNeill, Audrey (2–1)**	Tori Grifone (0–1)	None		111	2–2	
Feb. 10	vs. UT Arlington*		Youngsville Sports Complex • Youngsville, LA	8–4	**Paden, Averi (1–0)**	Moreno, Jade (0–1)	None		101	3–2	
Feb. 11	vs. Montana*		Youngsville Sports Complex • Youngsville, LA	9–2	**McNeill, Audrey (3–1)**	Brinka, Emmalyn (1–2)	None		123	4–2	
Houston Classic
Feb. 17	at Houston*		Cougar Softball Stadium • Houston, TX	1–5	Nicole Bodeux (1-1)	**McNeill, Audrey (3–2)**	Paris Lehman (1)	ESPN+	268	4–3	
Feb. 16	vs. UTSA*		Cougar Softball Stadium • Houston, TX	7–0	**Yoo, Molly (1-1)**	K. Schultz (0–5)	None			5–3	
Feb. 16	vs. UMass*		Cougar Softball Stadium • Houston, TX	1–2	Horton, Natalee (1-1)	**McNeill, A. (3-3)**	None			5–4	
Feb. 17	at Houston*		Cougar Softball Stadium • Houston, TX	3–11 (5 inn)	Shelby Smith (4–0)	**McNeill, Audrey (3–4)**	None	ESPN+	449	5–5	
Feb. 18	vs. UMass*		Cougar Softball Stadium • Houston, TX	11–2 (5 inn)	**Paden, Averi (2–0)**	Streicher, H (0–2)	None			6–5	
Feb. 21	Alcorn State*		Swanner Field at Geo Surfaces Park • Thibodaux, LA	11–1 (6 inn)	**VandenBout, Molly (1–0)**	Ashanti Carter (0–1)	None		103	7–5	
Feb. 21	Alcorn State*		Swanner Field at Geo Surfaces Park • Thibodaux, LA	8–0 (5 inn)	**Paden, Averi (3–0)**	Kiri Parker (0–1)			103	8–5	
Dugout Club Classic
Feb. 23	vs. FIU*		JoAnne Graf Field at the Seminole Softball Complex • Tallahassee, FL	11–1	**McNeill, Audrey (4-4)**	BIRLING, Sydney (1–2)	None			9–5	
Feb. 23	vs. FIU*		JoAnne Graf Field at the Seminole Softball Complex • Tallahassee, FL	3–0	**Yoo, Molly (2–1)**	AGES, Jordyn (1–2)	None			10–5	
Feb. 24	at Florida State*	11	JoAnne Graf Field at the Seminole Softball Complex • Tallahassee, FL	4–5	Allison Royalty (4–1)	**McNeill, Audrey (4–5)**	None			10–6	
Feb. 24	at Florida State*		JoAnne Graf Field at the Seminole Softball Complex • Tallahassee, FL	0–8 (5 inn)	Allison Royalty (5–1)	**Yoo, Molly (2-2)**	None			10–7	
Feb. 25	vs. Charleston Southern*		JoAnne Graf Field at the Seminole Softball Complex • Tallahassee, FL	2–1	**McNeill, Audrey (5-5)**	LAMB, Nealy (2–1)	None			11–7	
Feb. 27	Louisiana*		Swanner Field at Geo Surfaces Park • Thibodaux, LA	2–8	Sam Landry (3–5)	**Paden, Averi (3–1)**	None		213	11–8	

March (8–8)
Date	Opponent	Rank	Site/stadium	Score	Win	Loss	Save	TV	Attendance	Overall record	SLC record
Mar 1	Louisiana–Monroe*		Swanner Field at Geo Surfaces Park • Thibodaux, LA	3–4	Abrams, Victoria (6–2)	**Yoo, Molly (2–3)**	None	ESPN+	566	11–9	
Mar 2	Louisiana–Monroe*		Swanner Field at Geo Surfaces Park • Thibodaux, LA	5–4	**Yoo, Molly (3-3)**	Nichols, Maddie (6–3)	None	ESPN+	564	12–9	
Mar 2	Louisiana–Monroe*		Swanner Field at Geo Surfaces Park • Thibodaux, LA	0–12 (5 inn)	Kassidy, Giddens (4–1)	**McNeill, Audrey (5–6)**	None	ESPN+	614	12–10	
Mar 5	at Southern*		Lady Jaguar Field • Baton Rouge, LA	–	(-)	Postponed (weather)				–	
Mar 9	at Northwestern State		Lady Demon Diamond • Natchitoches, LA	9–5	**Yoo, Molly (4–3)**	Seely, Kenzie (5–6)	**Paden, Averi (1)**	ESPN+	228	13–10	1–0
Mar 9	at Northwestern State		Lady Demon Diamond • Natchitoches, LA	5–0	**McNeill, Audrey (6-6)**	Darr, Maggie (4–6)	None	ESPN+	218	14–10	2–0
Mar 10	at Northwestern State		Lady Demon Diamond • Natchitoches, LA	2–0	**McNeill, Audrey (7–6)**	Seely, Kenzie (5–7)	None	ESPN+	204	15–10	3–0
Mar 13	Ole Miss*		Swanner Field at Geo Surfaces Park • Thibodaux, LA	1–4	Makenna Kliethermes (8–2)	**Paden, Averi (3–2)**	None	ESPN+	467	15–11	
Mar 13	Ole Miss*		Swanner Field at Geo Surfaces Park • Thibodaux, LA	1–9	Catelyn Riley (2-2)	**McNeill, Audrey (7-7)**	None	ESPN+	202	15–12	
Mar 15	McNeese		Swanner Field at Geo Surfaces Park • Thibodaux, LA	1–4	Sanders, Shaelyn (7–6)	**McNeill, Audrey (7–8)**	None	ESPN+	189	15–13	3–1
Mar 15	McNeese		Swanner Field at Geo Surfaces Park • Thibodaux, LA	1–0	**Yoo, Molly (5–3)**	Schexnayder, Ryann (4–2)	None	ESPN+	122	16–13	4–1
Mar 16	McNeese		Swanner Field at Geo Surfaces Park • Thibodaux, LA	0–2	Sanders, Shaelyn (8–6)	**McNeill, Audrey (7–9)**	None	ESPN+	190	16–14	4–2
Mar 20	Southern Miss*		Swanner Field at Geo Surfaces Park • Thibodaux, LA	7–6 (9 inn)	**McNeill, Audrey (8–9)**	Jana Lee (1–3)	None		124	17–14	
Mar 26	LSU*		Swanner Field at Geo Surfaces Park • Thibodaux, LA	2–10	Raelin Chaffin (8–2)	**Yoo, Molly (5–4)**	None	ESPN+	703	17–15	
Mar 28	at Lamar		Lamar Softball Complex • Beaumont, TX	4–1 (13 inn)	**Paden, Averi (3–2)**	Mitchell, Karyana (10–2)	None	ESPN+	400	18–15	5–2
Mar 29	at Lamar		Lamar Softball Complex • Beaumont, TX	3–2	**Paden, Averi (5–2)**	Mitchell, Karyana (10–3)	None	ESPN+	400	19–15	6–2
Mar 29	at Lamar		Lamar Softball Complex • Beaumont, TX	0–2	Jolin, Sabrina (3-3)	**McNeill, Audrey (8–10)**	None	ESPN+	400	19–16	6–3

April (7–8)
Date	Opponent	Rank	Site/stadium	Score	Win	Loss	Save	TV	Attendance	Overall record	SLC record
Apr 3	at Southern Miss*		Southern Miss Softball Complex • Hattiesburg, MS	3–5	Jana Lee (5-5)	**Yoo, Molly (5-5)**	None	ESPN+	617	19–17	
Apr 5	Texas A&M–Commerce		Swanner Field at Geo Surfaces Park • Thibodaux, LA	6–2	**McNeill, Audrey (9–10)**	Sanchez, Julia (4–9)	None	ESPN+	101	20–17	7–3
Apr 5	Texas A&M–Commerce		Swanner Field at Geo Surfaces Park • Thibodaux, LA	4–2	**Paden, Averi (6–2)**	Muller, Maddie (3–14)	None	ESPN+	101	21–17	8–3
Apr 6	Texas A&M–Commerce		Swanner Field at Geo Surfaces Park • Thibodaux, LA	8–0 (5 inn)	**Yoo, Molly (6–5)**	Muller, Maddie (3–15)	None		100	22–17	9–3
Apr 10	Southern*		Swanner Field at Geo Surfaces Park • Thibodaux, LA	–	(-)	**Postponed**				–	
Apr 12	at Houston Christian		Husky Field • Houston, TX	0–4	Swanson, L. (5–6)	**McNeill, Audrey (9–11)**	None		300	22–18	9–4
Apr 12	at Houston Christian		Husky Field • Houston, TX	7–1	(-)	(-)				23–18	10–4
Apr 13	at Houston Christian		Husky Field • Houston, TX	1–5 (10 inn)	Swanson, L. (6-6)	**Paden, Averi (7–3)**	None		400	23–19	10–5
Apr 17	at Louisiana*	19	Yvette Girouard Field at Lamson Park • Lafayette, LA	0–9 (6 inn)	Sam Landry (16–7)	Yoo, Molly (6-6)	None		1,164	23–20	
Apr 19	Southeastern Louisiana		Swanner Field at Geo Surfaces Park • Thibodaux, LA	1–3	Blanchard, Cera (16–2)	**Yoo, Molly (6–7)**	None	ESPN+		23–21	10–6
Apr 19	Southeastern Louisiana		Swanner Field at Geo Surfaces Park • Thibodaux, LA	4–3	**McNeill, Audrey (10–11)**	DuBois, Ellie (12–4)	None	ESPN+	202	24–21	11–6
Apr 20	Southeastern Louisiana		Swanner Field at Geo Surfaces Park • Thibodaux, LA	7–5	**McNeill, Audrey (11-11)**	Comeaux, MC (3-3)	**Yoo, Molly (1)**		123	25–21	12–6
Apr 25	at Texas*	1	Red and Charline McCombs Field • Austin, TX	3–10	Czech, Estelle (8–3)	**Paden, Averi (7–4)**	Simpson, Sophia (2)	LHN	1,625	25–22	
Apr 26	at Incarnate Word		H-E-B Field • San Antonio, TX	3–11 (5 inn)	Larissa Jacquez (10–5)	**McNeill, Audrey (11–12)**	None	ESPN+	115	25–23	12–7
Apr 26	at Incarnate Word		H-E-B Field • San Antonio, TX	3–4	Maddy Blake (3–0)	**Yoo, Molly (6–8)**	None	ESPN+	115	25–24	12–8
Apr 27	at Incarnate Word		H-E-B Field • San Antonio, TX	4–2 (9 inn)	**McNeill, Audrey (12–11)**	Samantha Portillo (8–4)	None	ESPN+	170	26–24	13–8

May (3–0)
Date	Opponent	Rank	Site/stadium	Score	Win	Loss	Save	TV	Attendance	Overall record	SLC record
May 3	Texas A&M–Corpus Christi		Swanner Field at Geo Surfaces Park • Thibodaux, LA	2–0	**McNeill, Audrey (13–12)**	Aholelei, Primrose (15–10)	None		177	27–24	14–8
May 3	Texas A&M–Corpus Christi		Swanner Field at Geo Surfaces Park • Thibodaux, LA	7–1	**Yoo, Molly (7–8)**	Saenz, Ariella (2–6)	**Paden, Averi (2)**		201	28–24	15–8
May 4	Texas A&M–Corpus Christi		Swanner Field at Geo Surfaces Park • Thibodaux, LA	1–0	**McNeill, Audrey (14–12)**	Williams, Malia (3-3)	None		201	29–24	16–8

Post-Season (2–2)

Southland Tournament (2–2)
Date	Opponent	(Seed)/Rank	Site/stadium	Score	Win	Loss	Save	TV	Attendance	Overall record	Tournament record
May 7	vs. (7) Houston Christian	(3)	North Oak Park • Hammond, LA	5–4	**Paden, Averi (8–4)**	Swanson, Lyndie (10–8)	None	ESPN+	322	30–24	1–0
May 8	vs. (2) Southeastern Louisiana	(3)	North Oak Park • Hammond, LA	1–4	Blanchard, Cera (18–2)	**Yoo, Molly (7–9)**	None	ESPN+	456	30–25	1–1
May 8	vs. (5) Lamar	(3)	North Oak Park • Hammond, LA	5–4 (8 inn)	**Yoo, Molly(8–9)**	Mitchell, Karyana(13–9)	None	ESPN+	322	31–25	2–1
May 9	vs. (1) McNeese	(3)	North Oak Park • Hammond, LA	3–4 (8 inn)	Sanders, Shaelyn (20–10)	**McNeill, Audrey (14–13)**	None	ESPN+	520	31–26	2–2

Schedule source:

*Rankings are based on the team's current ranking in the NFCA/USA Softball poll.

== Conference awards and honors ==
=== Post-season All-Southland Conference Teams ===
Reglin Heflin was named as a conference first team member. Abby Anderson was named as a second team member.

Player of the Year: Victoria Altamirano, UIW

Hitter of the Year: Ka'Lyn Watson, Southeastern

Pitcher of the Year: Shaelyn Sanders, McNeese

Freshman of the Year: Alexis Dibbley, McNeese

Newcomer of the Year: Shenita Tucker, Lamar

Coach of the Year: James Landreneau, McNeese

==== First Team ====
- Corine Poncho (MCNS, SO, 1st Base)
- Mariana Torres (MCNS, SR, 2nd Base)
- Chloe Magee (SELA, FR, Shortstop)
- Maddison Guillen (UIW, SR, 3rd Base)
- Bailey Krolczyk (SELA, SR, Catcher)
- Victoria Altamirano (UIW, SO, Utility)
- Audrey Greely (SELA, SR, Designated Player)
- Reagan Heflin (NICH, SO, Outfielder)
- Ka'Lyn Watson (SELA, SR, Outfielder)
- Alexis Dibbley (MCNS, FR, Outfielder)
- Cera Blanchard (SELA, SR, Pitcher)
- Shaelyn Sanders (MCNS, SR, Pitcher)

==== Second Team ====
- Lexi Johnson (SELA, SR, 1st Base)
- Ryleigh Mata (UIW, JR, 2nd Base)
- Baylee Lemons (UIW, JR, Shortstop)
- Rylie Bouvier (MCNS, JR, 3rd Base)
- Bella Perez (MCNS, FR, Catcher)
- Haylie Savage (HCU, JR, Utility)
- Crislyne Moreno (MCNS, JR, Designated Player)
- Jillian Guiterrez (UIW, SO, Outfield)
- Abby Andersen (NICH, SR, Outfield)
- Cam Goodman (SELA, SR, Outfield)
- Primrose Aholelei (TAMUCC, SR, Pitcher)
- Ellie DuBois (SELA, SR, Pitcher)

=== Weekly awards ===
Weekly honors
Honors	Player	Position	Date Awarded	Ref.
SLC Pitcher of the week	Audrey McNeill	RHP	February 12, 2024	
SLC Hitter of the week	Molly VandenBout	DP	February 26, 2024	
SLC Pitcher of the week	Audrey McNeill	RHP	March 11, 2024	
SLC Pitcher of the week	Audrey McNeill	RHP	May 6, 2024	

== See also ==
2024 Nicholls Colonels baseball team
