= 2024 Southland Conference softball tournament =

- Teams: 7
- Format: Double-elimination tournament
- Finals site: North Oak Park; Hammond, Louisiana
- Champions: Southeastern Louisiana (1st title)
- Winning coach: Rick Fremin (1st title)
- MVP: Lexi Johnson (Southeastern Louisiana)
- Attendance: 3,725
- Television: ESPN+

2024 Southland Conference softball standings
	Conf.				Overall
Team	W		L	PCT	W		L	PCT
McNeese ‍†‍‍	22	–	2	.917	40	–	20	.667
Southeastern Louisiana ‍‍‡‍^{y}	17	–	7	.708	47	–	15	.758
Nicholls ‍‍‍	16	–	8	.667	31	–	26	.544
Incarnate Word ‍‍‍	14	–	9	.609	34	–	17	.667
Lamar ‍‍‍	12	–	12	.500	26	–	25	.510
Texas A&M–Corpus Christi ‍‍‍	9	–	15	.375	21	–	22	.488
Houston Christian ‍‍‍	9	–	15	.375	23	–	27	.460
Northwestern State ‍‍‍	5	–	18	.217	19	–	31	.380
Texas A&M–Commerce* ‍‍‍	2	–	22	.083	9	–	45	.167
† – Conference champion ‡ – Tournament champion y – Invited to the NCAA tournament * Ineligible for the 2024 NCAA tournament due to transition from Division II; As of May 19, 2024; Rankings from NFCA/USA Today

The 2024 Southland Conference tournament was held at North Oak Park in Hammond, Louisiana from May 7 through 10, 2024. The tournament winner, Southeastern Louisiana, earned the Southland Conference's automatic bid to the 2024 NCAA Division I softball tournament. All games were broadcast on ESPN+.

== Format ==
The tournament was a modified 7 team double elimination format. The first game was single elimination game. The first and second seeded teams received byes to the second round.

== Seeds ==
Teams were seeded by record within the conference with a tie–breaker system to seed teams with identical conference records. The top seven teams in the conference play qualified for the tournament.

Seed	School	Conference	Tie-breaker #1	Tie-breaker #2
1	McNeese	22–2	Not needed	
2	Southeastern Louisiana	17–7	Not needed	
3	Nicholls	16–8	Not needed	
4	Incarnate Word	14–8	Not needed	
5	Lamar	12–12	Not needed	
6	Texas A&M–Corpus Christi	9–15	2–1 vs Houston Christian	
7	Houston Christian	9–15	1–2 vs. Texas A&M–Corpus Christi	

- Northwestern State and Texas A&M–Commerce did not qualify for the tournament. New Orleans does not sponsor a softball team.

== Tournament ==
Round	Game	Time*	Matchup	Score	Attendance	Notes	Television
First day – Tuesday, May 7, 2024
1	1	1:00 pm	No. 6 Texas A&M–Corpus Christi vs. No. 7 Houston Christian	2–7	205	Texas A&M–Corpus Christi eliminated	ESPN+
1	2	4:10 pm	No. 4 Incarnate Word vs. No. 5 Lamar	5–4^{8}	322		ESPN+
1	3	7:49 pm	No. 3 Nicholls vs. No. 7 Houston Christian	5–4	322		ESPN+
Second day – Wednesday, May 8, 2024
2	4	11:00 am	No. 1 McNeese vs. No. 4 Incarnate Word	2–3	332		ESPN+
2	5	1:49 pm	No. 2 Southeastern Louisiana vs. No. 3 Nicholls	4–1	456		ESPN+
2	6	4:19 pm	No. 5 Lamar vs. No. 3 Nicholls	4–5^{8}	322	Lamar eliminated	ESPN+
2	7	7:34 pm	No. 7 Houston Christian vs. No. 1 McNeese	6–8	322	Houston Christian eliminated	ESPN+
Third day– Thursday, May 9, 2024
3	8	1:00 pm	No. 4 Incarnate Word vs. No. 2 Southeastern Louisiana	1–6	467		ESPN+
3	9	3:30 pm	No. 3 Nicholls vs. No. 1 McNeese	3–4^{8}	520	Nicholls eliminated	ESPN+
3	10	6:00 pm	No. 4 Incarnate Word vs. No. 1 McNeese	8–7	322	McNeese eliminated	ESPN+
Championship – Friday, May 10, 2024
4	11	12:00 pm	No. 2 Southeastern Louisiana vs. No. 4 Incarnate Word	8–7	457	Southeastern Louisiana is tournament champion	ESPN+
4	12	TBD	Game 11 winner vs. Game 10 loser	–		Not necessary	ESPN+
*Game times in CDT. #-Rankings denote tournament seeding.

== Bracket and results ==
=== Single elimination round ===
Tuesday, May 7
Team	R
No. 6 Texas A&M–Corpus Christi	2
No. 7 Houston Christian	7
Notes: Texas A&M–Corpus Christi eliminated.

=== Main bracket ===
Upper round 1
4	Incarnate Word	5^{8}
5	Lamar	4
3	Nicholls	5
7	Houston Christian	4
Lower round 1
5	Lamar	4^{8}
3	Nicholls	5
7	Houston Christian	6
1	McNeese	8

Upper round 2
4	Incarnate Word	3
1	McNeese	2
3	Nicholls	1
2	Southeastern Louisiana	4
Lower round 2
3	Nicholls	3^{8}
1	McNeese	4

Upper final
4	Incarnate Word	1
2	Southeastern Louisiana	6
Lower final
4	Incarnate Word	8
1	McNeese	7

Final
2	Southeastern Louisiana	8
4	Incarnate Word	7

=== Championship playoff (not needed) ===
Friday, May 10
Team	R
Game 11 winner	
Game 11 loser	

== Awards and honors ==
Tournament MVP: Lexi Johnson, Southeastern Louisiana

All-Tournament Teams: Source:

Lexi Johnson, 1B, Southeastern Louisiana - MVP
Bailey Krolczyk, C, Southeastern
Cera Blanchard, RHP, Southeastern
Maddie Watson, 2B, Southeastern
Ka'Lyn Watson, OF, Southeastern
Maddison Guillen, 3B, UIW
Avalon Sanchez, DP, UIW
Victoria Altamirano, 1B, UIW
Samantha Portillo, RHP, UIW
Alexis Dibbley, OF, McNeese
Shaelyn Sanders, RHP, McNeese
Claire Sisco, 2B, Nicholls

== See also ==
2024 Southland Conference baseball tournament
