= 2024 Incarnate Word Cardinals softball team =

American college softball season

2024 Incarnate Word Cardinals softball
- Conference: Southland Conference
- Record: 34–16 (15–8 Southland)
- Head coach: Kimberly Dean (3rd season)
- Assistant coaches: Robyn Leighton; Benjamin Buechner; Josh Reeves – Volunteer Asst
- Home stadium: H-E-B Field

2024 Southland Conference softball standings
	Conf.				Overall
Team	W		L	PCT	W		L	PCT
McNeese ‍†‍‍	22	–	2	.917	40	–	20	.667
Southeastern Louisiana ‍‍‡‍^{y}	17	–	7	.708	47	–	15	.758
Nicholls ‍‍‍	16	–	8	.667	31	–	26	.544
Incarnate Word ‍‍‍	14	–	9	.609	34	–	17	.667
Lamar ‍‍‍	12	–	12	.500	26	–	25	.510
Texas A&M–Corpus Christi ‍‍‍	9	–	15	.375	21	–	22	.488
Houston Christian ‍‍‍	9	–	15	.375	23	–	27	.460
Northwestern State ‍‍‍	5	–	18	.217	19	–	31	.380
Texas A&M–Commerce* ‍‍‍	2	–	22	.083	9	–	45	.167
† – Conference champion ‡ – Tournament champion y – Invited to the NCAA tournament * Ineligible for the 2024 NCAA tournament due to transition from Division II; As of May 19, 2024; Rankings from NFCA/USA Today

The 2024 Incarnate Word Cardinals softball team represented the University of the Incarnate Word during the 2024 NCAA Division I softball season. The Cardinals played their home games at H-E-B Field and were led by third-year head coach Kimberly Dean. They were members of the Southland Conference.

== Previous season ==
The Cardinals compiled an overall record of 16–30–1, and a conference record of 8–16. Finishing in eighth place in conference play, the Cardinals did not qualify for the conference tournament.

== Preseason ==
=== Southland Conference Coaches Poll ===
The Southland Conference Coaches Poll was released on February 2, 2024. Incarnate Word was picked to finish eighth in the Southland Conference with 30 votes.

Coaches poll
Predicted finish	Team	Votes (1st place)
1	McNeese State	128 (16)
2	Southeastern Louisiana	114 (2)
3	Nicholls	97
4	Lamar	78
5	Texas A&M–Corpus Christi	72
6	Northwestern State	63
7	Houston Christian	49
8	Incarnate Word	30
9	Texas A&M–Commerce	17

=== Preseason All-Southland team ===
No Cardinals were named to the conference preseason teams.

==== First Team ====
- Lexi Johnson (SELA, SR, 1st Base)
- Erin Kraus (NICH, SO, 2nd Base)
- Haylie Savage HCU, JR, 3rd Base)
- Reese Reyna (MCNS, JR, Shortstop)
- Bailey Krolczyk (SELA, SR, Catcher)
- Chloe Gomez (MCNS, SR, Utility)
- Audrey Greely (SELA, SR, Designated Player)
- Alexa Poche (NICH, SR, Outfielder)
- AB Garcia (HCU, SO, Outfielder)
- Erin Ardoin (MCNS, JR, Outfielder)
- Ashley Vallejo (MCNS, JR, Pitcher)
- Primrose Aholelei (TAMUCC, JR, Pitcher)

==== Second Team ====
- Crislyne Mareno (MCNS, JR, 1st Base)
- Mariana Torres (MCNS, JR, 2nd Base)
- Rylie Bouvier (MCNS, JR, 3rd Base)
- Brooke Davis (LU, SR, Shortstop)
- Ashlyn Walker (NWST, SR, Catcher)
- Sydney Hoyt (TAMUCC, SR, Utility)
- Cameron Niedenthal (LU, SR, Designated Player)
- Cam Goodman (SELU, SR, Outfielder)
- Ka'Lyn Watson (SELU, SR, Outfielder)
- Laney Roos (NWST, SR, Outfielder)
- Maggie Darr (NWST, SR, Pitcher)
- Shaelyn Sanders (MCNS, SR, Pitcher)

== Roster ==
2024 Incarnate Word Cardinals roster
Pitchers: 8 Bella Mitchell - Sophomore; 10 Audrey Gallegos - Freshman; 13 Annie Gunther - Graduate; 17 Sammy Portillo - Sophomore; 22 Larissa Jaquez - Freshman; 28 Maddy Blake - Senior; 77 Aaliya Garcia - Graduate; Outfielders: 5 Darian Cram - Senior; 6 Dominique Guerra - Sophomore; 11 Karissa Williams - Freshman; 12 Jillian Guiterrez - Sophomore; 15 Aylya Gonzales- Freshman	Catchers: 1 Erin Perez - Freshman; 3 Malarie Medina - Freshman; 7 Marissa Espinoza - Freshman; 20 Jasmine Sierra - Sophomore; 24 Natalie Pacheco - Freshman; 26 Avalon Sanchez - Senior; Infielders: 2 Maddison Guillen - Senior; 4 Bryanna Fuentes - Freshman; 14 Britaney Shaw - Graduate; 23 Baylee Lemons - Junior; 16 Hannah Zajdel - Redshirt Sophomore; 27 Leah Hayes - Senior; 34 Lauren Webb - Freshman; 37 Jasmine Contreras - Freshman; Utility: 0 Jaisy Caceres - Freshman; 16 Madison Dorrow - Sophomore; 19 Victoria Altamirano - Sophomore

=== Coaching staff ===
2024 Incarnate Word Cardinals coaching staff
- Kimberly Dean – Head Coach – 3rd year
- Robyn Leighton – Assistant Coach
- Benjamin Buechner – Assistant Coach
- Josh Reeves – Volunteer Assistant

== Schedule and results ==
Legend
	Incarnate Word win
	Incarnate Word loss
	Incarnate Word tie
	Postponement/Cancellation
**Bold**	Incarnate Word team member

2024 Incarnate Word Cardinals softball game log
Regular season (34–16)

February (9–1)
Date	Opponent	Rank	Site/stadium	Score	Win	Loss	Save	TV	Attendance	Overall record	SLC record
Cardinal Classic
Feb. 9	Lindenwood*		H-E-B Field • San Antonio, TX	2–0	**Mitchell, Bella (1-0)**	BERKEY, Molly. (0-1)	None		87	1–0	
Feb. 9	Buffalo*		H-E-B Field • San Antonio, TX	8–0	**Portillo, Samantha (1-0)**	Tarantino, Julia (0-1)	None		115	2–0	
Feb. 10	Buffalo*		H-E-B Field • San Antonio, TX	9–8	**Blake, Maddy (1-0)**	Watters, Emily (0-1)	None		88	3–0	
Feb. 10	Lindenwood*		H-E-B Field • San Antonio, TX	7–0	**Portillo, Samantha (0-0)**	Weyh, Amanda (1-1)	None		88	4–0	
Feb. 11	Prairie View A&M*		H-E-B Field • San Antonio, TX	4–3	**Larissa Jacquez (1-0)**	Breanna Reyna (-)	None		115	5–0	
Defend the Bluff Tournament
Feb. 16	vs. Tennessee Tech*		Lady Jaguar Field • Baton Rouge, LA			Cancelled					
Feb. 16	at Southern*		Lady Jaguar Field • Baton Rouge, LA			Cancelled					
Feb. 17	at Southern*		Lady Jaguar Field • Baton Rouge, LA			Cancelled					
Feb. 17	vs. Tennessee Tech*		Lady Jaguar Field • Baton Rouge, LA			Cancelled					
Camel Stampede
Feb. 23	vs. Saint Joseph's*		Amanda Littlejohn Stadium • Buies Creek, NC	13–5	**Gunther, Annie (1-0)**	E. Siler (0-4)	None		128	6–0	
Feb. 23	at Campbell*		Amanda Littlejohn Stadium • Buies Creek, NC	4–5	SMITH, I (2-3)	**Jacquez, Larissa (1-1)**	None		124	6–1	
Feb. 24	vs. Winthrop*		Amanda Littlejohn Stadium • Buies Creek, NC	5–4	**Maddy Blake (2-0)**	Perez, Erin (4-4)	None		128	7–1	
Feb. 24	at Campbell*		Amanda Littlejohn Stadium • Buies Creek, NC	5–4	**Blake, Maddy (2-0)**	BASINGER, Reese (4-4)	None		128	8–1	
Feb. 25	vs. Saint Joseph's*		Amanda Littlejohn Stadium • Buies Creek, NC	5–0	**Jacquez, Larissa (2-1)**	Emily Siler (1-2)	None		90	9–1	

March (11–9)
Date	Opponent	Rank	Site/stadium	Score	Win	Loss	Save	TV	Attendance	Overall record	SLC record
5th Boerner Invitational
Mar 1	vs. UTSA*		Allan Saxe Field • Arlington, TX	3–6	Z. Camacho (2-0)	**Portillo, Samantha (2-1)**	None			9–2	
Mar 1	at UT Arlingtton*		Allan Saxe Field • Arlington, TX	9–0	**Mitchell, Bella (2-0)**	Bumpurs (0-5)	None		152	10–2	
Mar 2	vs. Grambling*		Allan Saxe Field • Arlington, TX	10–1	**Jacquez, Larissa (3-1)**	S. Matthews (0-3)	None		85	11–2	
Mar 2	vs. Grambling*		Allan Saxe Field • Arlington, TX	9–2	**Mitchell, Bella (3-0)**	J. Hodge (1-1)	**Gunther, Annie (1)**		100	12–2	
Mar 3	at UT Arlington*		Allan Saxe Field • Arlington, TX	0–1	Adams, Jessica(3-5)	**Larissa Jacquez(3-2)**	None		319	12–3	
Mar 9	at Southeastern Louisiana		North Oak Park • Hammond, LA	3–4	Brunson, A. (2-0)	**Gunther, A (2-1)**	Blanchard, C (2)	ESPN+	160	12–4	0–1
Mar 9	at Southeastern Louisiana		North Oak Park • Hammond, LA	0–2	Blanchard, C (7-1)	**Jacquez, L (3-3)**	None	ESPN+	160	12–5	0–2
Mar 10	at Southeastern Louisiana		North Oak Park • Hammond, LA	6–3	**Mitchell, B (4-0)**	Comeaux, M. (2-2)	**Jacquez, L (1)**	ESPN+	151	13–5	1–2
Mar 12	at Jackson State*		Jackson State University Softball Stadium • Jackson, MS	5–6	Salazar, V. (7-3)	**Gunther, Annie (2-1)**	None		50	13–6	
Mar 15	Texas A&M–Corpus Christi		H-E-B Field • San Antonio, TX	6–2	**Jacquez, Larissa (4-3)**	Aholelei, Primrose (9-5)	None	ESPN+	145	14–6	2–2
Mar 15	Texas A&M–Corpus Christi		H-E-B Field • San Antonio, TX	11–2 (6 inn)	**Gunther, Annie (3-2)**	Saenz, Ariella (2-2)	None	ESPN+	150	15–6	3–2
Mar 16	Texas A&M–Corpus Christi		H-E-B Field • San Antonio, TX	4–0	**Portillo, Samantha (3-1)**	Galvan, Siarah (1-1)	None	ESPN+	78	16–6	4–2
Mar 22	at McNeese		Joe Miller Field at Cowgirl Diamond • Lake Charles, LA	3–4	Sanders, Shaelyn (9-6)	**Larissa Jacquez (4-4)**	Schexnayder, Ryann (1)		150	16–7	4–3
Mar 23	at McNeese		Joe Miller Field at Cowgirl Diamond • Lake Charles, LA	0–3	Davis, Lindsay (3-5)	**Samantha Portillo (3-2)**	None			16–8	4–4
Mar 23	at McNeese		Joe Miller Field at Cowgirl Diamond • Lake Charles, LA	6–11	Schexnayder, Ryann (5-2)	**Gunther, Annie (3-3)**	Gunther, Annie (3-3)		747	16–9	4–5
Mar 26	Texas Southern*		H–E–B Field • San Antonio, TX	7–6	**Portillo, Samantha (4-2)**	Maren Berger (3-4)	None	ESPN+	57	17–9	
Mar 26	Texas Southern*		H–E–B Field • San Antonio, TX	4–5	M. Gonzales (3-1)	**Portillo, Samantha (3-3)**	None	ESPN+	70	17–10	
Mar 29	Texas A&M–Commerce		H–E–B Field • San Antonio, TX	10–0 (5 inn)	**Larissa Jacquez (5-3)**	Martinez, Destiny (0-6)	None	ESPN+	73	18–10	5–5
Mar 30	Texas A&M–Commerce		H–E–B Field • San Antonio, TX	9–1 (5 inn)	**Portillo, Samantha (5-3)**	Muller, Maddie (3-13)	None	ESPN+	110	19–10	6–5
Mar 30	Texas A&M–Commerce		H–E–B Field • San Antonio, TX	9–8	**Jacquez, Larissa (6-4)**	Arredondo, Anissa (0-5)	None	ESPN+	110	20–10	7–5

April (10–4)
Date	Opponent	Rank	Site/stadium	Score	Win	Loss	Save	TV	Attendance	Overall record	SLC record
Apr 5	Houston Christian		H–E–B Field • San Antonio, TX	9–1 (6 inn)	**Jacquez, Larissa (7-4)**	Grofman, R. (5-6)	None	ESPN+	54	21–10	8–5
Apr 6	Houston Christian		H–E–B Field • San Antonio, TX	12–0 (5 inn)	**Portillo, Samantha (6-3)**	Swanson, Lyndie (4-6)	None	ESPN+	55	22–10	9–5
Apr 6	Houston Christian		H–E–B Field • San Antonio, TX	4–1	**Mitchell, Bella (5-0)**	Grofman, Ronni (5-6)	None	ESPN+	65	23–10	10–5
Apr 13	Santa Clara*		H-E-B Field • San Antonio, TX	7–8 (8 inn)	VALDEZ, Alaina (4-3)	**Mitchell, Bella (5-1)**	None	ESPN+	115	23–11	
Apr 13	Santa Clara*		H-E-B Field • San Antonio, TX	8–7	**Gallegos, Audrey (1-0)**	HAGER, Sage (2-1)	None	ESPN+	110	24–11	
Apr 14	Santa Clara*		H-E-B Field • San Antonio, TX	4–2	**Jacquez, Larissa (8-4)**	SEVA, Avery (4-5)	None	ESPN+	72	25–11	
Apr 16	at Prairie View A&M*		Lady Panther Softball Complex • Prairie View, TX	7–5	**Portillo, Samantha (7-3)**	Jerrica Rojas (4-3)	None		79	26–11	
Apr 19	at Lamar		Lamar Softball Complex • Beaumont, TX	4–2 (9 inn)	**Larissa Jacquez (9-4)**	Wardlaw, Emma (9-5)	None	ESPN+	500	27–11	11–5
Apr 19	at Lamar		Lamar Softball Complex • Beaumont, TX	8–0 (6 inn)	**Samantha Portillo (7-3)**	Mitchell, Karyana (12-6)	None	ESPN+	580	28–11	12–5
Apr 20	at Lamar		Lamar Softball Complex • Beaumont, TX	4–5	Mitchell, Karyana (13-6)	**Samantha Portillo (7-4)**	None	ESPN+	750	28–12	12–6
Apr 23	UTSA*		H–E–B Field • San Antonio, TX	6–7	J. Gilbert (6-13)	**Jacquez, Larissa (9-5)**	None	ESPN+	77	28–13	
Apr 26	Nicholls		H–E–B Field • San Antonio, TX	11–3 (5 inn)	**Jacquez, Larissa (10-5)**	McNeill, Audrey (11-12)	None	ESPN+	115	29–13	13–6
Apr 26	Nicholls		H–E–B Field • San Antonio, TX	4–3	**Blake, Maddy (3-0)**	Yoo, Molly (6-8)	None	ESPN+	115	30–13	14–6
Apr 27	Nicholls		H–E–B Field • San Antonio, TX	2–4	Audrey McNeill	**Samantha Portillo (7-5)**	None	ESPN+	170	30–14	14–7

(7-5)

May (1–1)
Date	Opponent	Rank	Site/stadium	Score	Win	Loss	Save	TV	Attendance	Overall record	SLC record
May 3	at Northwestern State		Lady Demon Diamond • Natchitoches, LA	6–2	**Jacquez, Larissa (11-5)**	Darr, Maggie (7-15)	None	ESPN+	388	30–15	14–8
May 3	at Northwestern State		Lady Demon Diamond • Natchitoches, LA	0–1	Seely, Kenzie (9-14)	**Portillo, Samantha (8-6)**	None	ESPN+	388	31–15	15–8
May 4	at Northwestern State		Lady Demon Diamond • Natchitoches, LA			**Cancelled**				31–15	15–8

Postseason (3–1)

Southland Tournament (3–1)
Date	Opponent	(Seed)/Rank	Site/stadium	Score	Win	Loss	Save	TV	Attendance	Overall record	Tournament record
May 7	vs. (5) Lamar	(4)	North Oak Park • Hammond, LA	5–4	**Samantha Portillo(9-6)**	Mitchell, Karyana(13-8)	None	ESPN+	322	32–15	1–0
May 8	vs. (1) McNeese	(4)	North Oak Park • Hammond, LA	3–2	**Samantha Portillo(10-6)**	Sanders, Shaelyn(19-10)	None	ESPN+	332	33–15	2–0
May 9	at (2) Southeastern Louisiana	(4)	North Oak Park • Hammond, LA	1–6	DuBois, Ellie(14-5)	**Larissa Jacquez(11-6)**	None	ESPN+	467	33–16	2–1
May 9	vs. (1) McNeese	(4)	North Oak Park • Hammond, LA	8–7	**Samantha Portillo(11-6)**	Schexnayder, Ryann(9-3)	None	ESPN+	322	34–16	3–1
May 10	at (2) Southeastern Louisiana	(4)	North Oak Park • Hammond, LA	–	(-)	(-)		ESPN+		–	–

–

Schedule source:*Rankings are based on the team's current ranking in the NFCA/USA Softball poll.

== Conference awards and honors ==
=== Post-season All-Southland Conference Teams ===
Victoria Altamirano was named Player of the Year. Maddison Guillen and Victoria Altamirano were named as first team All-conference members. Ryleigh Mata, Baylee Lemons, and Jillian Guiterrez were named as second team members.

Player of the Year: Victoria Altamirano, UIW

Hitter of the Year: Ka'Lyn Watson, Southeastern

Pitcher of the Year: Shaelyn Sanders, McNeese

Freshman of the Year: Alexis Dibbley, McNeese

Newcomer of the Year: Shenita Tucker, Lamar

Coach of the Year: James Landreneau, McNeese

==== First Team ====
- Corine Poncho (MCNS, SO, 1st Base)
- Mariana Torres (MCNS, SR, 2nd Base)
- Chloe Magee (SELA, FR, Shortstop)
- Maddison Guillen (UIW, SR, 3rd Base)
- Bailey Krolczyk (SELA, SR, Catcher)
- Victoria Altamirano (UIW, SO, Utility)
- Audrey Greely (SELA, SR, Designated Player)
- Reagan Heflin (NICH, SO, Outfielder)
- Ka'Lyn Watson (SELA, SR, Outfielder)
- Alexis Dibbley (MCNS, FR, Outfielder)
- Cera Blanchard (SELA, SR, Pitcher)
- Shaelyn Sanders (MCNS, SR, Pitcher)

==== Second Team ====
- Lexi Johnson (SELA, SR, 1st Base)
- Ryleigh Mata (UIW, JR, 2nd Base)
- Baylee Lemons (UIW, JR, Shortstop)
- Rylie Bouvier (MCNS, JR, 3rd Base)
- Bella Perez (MCNS, FR, Catcher)
- Haylie Savage (HCU, JR, Utility)
- Crislyne Moreno (MCNS, JR, Designated Player)
- Jillian Guiterrez (UIW, SO, Outfield)
- Abby Andersen (NICH, SR, Outfield)
- Cam Goodman (SELA, SR, Outfield)
- Primrose Aholelei (TAMUCC, SR, Pitcher)
- Ellie DuBois (SELA, SR, Pitcher)

== See also ==
2024 Incarnate Word Cardinals baseball team
