= 2024 McNeese Cowgirls softball team =

American college softball season

2024 McNeese Cowgirls softball

Southland Conference regular season champion
- Conference: Southland Conference
- Record: 40–20 (22–2 Southland)
- Head coach: James Landreneau (8th season)
- Assistant coaches: Shelby Sunseri; Alexis Otero; Alayis Seneca
- Home stadium: Joe Miller Field at Cowgirl Diamond

2024 Southland Conference softball standings
| | Conf. | | | | Overall |
| Team | W | | L | PCT | W | | L | PCT |
|---|---|---|---|---|---|---|---|---|
| McNeese ‍†‍‍ | 22 | – | 2 | .917 | 40 | – | 20 | .667 |
| Southeastern Louisiana ‍‍‡‍^{y} | 17 | – | 7 | .708 | 47 | – | 15 | .758 |
| Nicholls ‍‍‍ | 16 | – | 8 | .667 | 31 | – | 26 | .544 |
| Incarnate Word ‍‍‍ | 14 | – | 9 | .609 | 34 | – | 17 | .667 |
| Lamar ‍‍‍ | 12 | – | 12 | .500 | 26 | – | 25 | .510 |
| Texas A&M–Corpus Christi ‍‍‍ | 9 | – | 15 | .375 | 21 | – | 22 | .488 |
| Houston Christian ‍‍‍ | 9 | – | 15 | .375 | 23 | – | 27 | .460 |
| Northwestern State ‍‍‍ | 5 | – | 18 | .217 | 19 | – | 31 | .380 |
| Texas A&M–Commerce* ‍‍‍ | 2 | – | 22 | .083 | 9 | – | 45 | .167 |
† – Conference champion ‡ – Tournament champion y – Invited to the NCAA tournament * Ineligible for the 2024 NCAA tournament due to transition from Division II; As of May 19, 2024; Rankings from NFCA/USA Today

The 2024 McNeese Cowgirls softball team represents McNeese State University during the 2024 NCAA Division I softball season. The Cowgirls play their home games at Joe Miller Field at Cowgirl Diamond and are led by eighth-year head coach James Landreneau. They are members of the Southland Conference.

The Cowgirls compiled a 40–20 overall record with a 22–2 conference record winning the SLC regular season championship. They were seeded first in the SLC tournament finishing with a 2–2 record in tournament play. The Cowgirls defeated seventh seeded Houston Christian 8–6 and third seeded Nicholls 4–3^{8}. They were eliminated from the tournament after losing two times to fourth seeded Incarnate Word. The first game score was 2–3. The second game was a 7–8^{8} extra innings loss.

== Previous season ==
McNeese had a regular season record of 41–14 and a conference record of 21–3 winning the Southland Conference regular season championship. They also won the 2023 Southland Conference softball tournament as the first seeded team.

The Cowgirls won the SLC autobid to the 2023 NCAA Division I softball tournament. They were runner-up to the Seattle Regional championship compiling a tournament record of 3–2. Leading the regional championship game 6–0 through the sixth inning, the Cowgirls' season ended ultimately losing to the tournament hosts, # 7 ranked Washington Huskies 7–6. The Cowgirls' final overall record was 47–16.

== Preseason ==
=== Southland Conference Coaches Poll ===
The Southland Conference Coaches Poll was released on February 2, 2024. McNeese was picked to finish first in the Southland Conference with 128 overall votes and 16 first place votes.

Coaches poll
| Predicted finish | Team | Votes (1st place) |
| 1 | McNeese State | 128 (16) |
| 2 | Southeastern Louisiana | 114 (2) |
| 3 | Nicholls | 97 |
| 4 | Lamar | 78 |
| 5 | Texas A&M–Corpus Christi | 72 |
| 6 | Northwestern State | 63 |
| 7 | Houston Christian | 49 |
| 8 | Incarnate Word | 30 |
| 9 | Texas A&M–Commerce | 17 |

=== Preseason All-Southland team ===
Reese Reyna, Chloe Gomez, Erin Ardoin, and Ashley Vallejo were named to the conference preseason first team. Crislyne Mareno, Mariana Torres, Rylie Bouvier, and Shaelyn Sanders were named to the conference preseason second team.

==== First Team ====
- Lexi Johnson (SELA, SR, 1st Base)
- Erin Kraus (NICH, SO, 2nd Base)
- Haylie Savage HCU, JR, 3rd Base)
- Reese Reyna (MCNS, JR, Shortstop)
- Bailey Krolczyk (SELA, SR, Catcher)
- Chloe Gomez (MCNS, SR, Utility)
- Audrey Greely (SELA, SR, Designated Player)
- Alexa Poche (NICH, SR, Outfielder)
- AB Garcia (HCU, SO, Outfielder)Player of the Year: Victoria Altamirano, UIW

Hitter of the Year: Ka'Lyn Watson, Southeastern

Pitcher of the Year: Shaelyn Sanders, McNeese

Freshman of the Year: Alexis Dibbley, McNeese

Newcomer of the Year: Shenita Tucker, Lamar

Coach of the Year: James Landreneau, McNeese

- Erin Ardoin (MCNS, JR, Outfielder)
- Ashley Vallejo (MCNS, JR, Pitcher)
- Primrose Aholelei (TAMUCC, JR, Pitcher)

==== Second Team ====
- Crislyne Mareno (MCNS, JR, 1st Base)
- Mariana Torres (MCNS, JR, 2nd Base)
- Rylie Bouvier (MCNS, JR, 3rd Base)
- Brooke Davis (LU, SR, Shortstop)
- Ashlyn Walker (NWST, SR, Catcher)
- Sydney Hoyt (TAMUCC, SR, Utility)
- Cameron Niedenthal (LU, SR, Designated Player)
- Cam Goodman (SELU, SR, Outfielder)
- Ka'Lyn Watson (SELU, SR, Outfielder)
- Laney Roos (NWST, SR, Outfielder)
- Maggie Darr (NWST, SR, Pitcher)
- Shaelyn Sanders (MCNS, SR, Pitcher)

== Roster ==
2024 McNeese Cowgirls softball team
Players
Coaches

| # | Pos. | Name | Bats/throws | Height | Year | Home town |
|---|---|---|---|---|---|---|
| 1 | INF | Jada Munoz | R/R | 5 ft 6 in (1.68 m) | So | San Antonio, Texas |
| 2 | INF | Brook Otto | R/R | 5 ft 6 in (1.68 m) | So | Smithville, Texas |
| 3 | RHP | Ashley Vallejo | R/R | 5 ft 7 in (1.7 m) | Sr | New Waverly, Texas |
| 4 | U | Erynn Boatright | R/R | 5 ft 5 in (1.65 m) | Fr | Independence, Missouri |
| 5 | U | Ashley Hagebusch | R/R | 5 ft 1 in (1.55 m) | Fr | Conroe, Texas |
| 6 | OF | Erin Ardoin | L/R | 5 ft 6 in (1.68 m) | Jr | Moss Bluff, Louisiana |
| 7 | OF | Rylee Eyster | L/R | 5 ft 3 in (1.6 m) | So | Southaven, Mississippi |
| 8 | U | Grace Janik | R/R | 5 ft 9 in (1.75 m) | So | Missouri City, Texas |
| 9 | RHP | Lindsey Davis | R/R | 5 ft 8 in (1.73 m) | So | Troup, Texas |
| 10 | RHP | Emma Banks | R/R | 5 ft 11 in (1.8 m) | Fr | Stuttgart, Arkansas |
| 11 | LHP | Ryann Schexnayder | L/L | 5 ft 8 in (1.73 m) | So | Walker, Louisiana |
| 12 | INF | Mariana Torres | R/R | 5 ft 8 in (1.73 m) | Jr | Pflugerville, Texas |
| 14 | INF | Crislyne Moreno | R/R | 5 ft 8 in (1.73 m) | Jr | Converse, Texas |
| 15 | RHP | Alexis Dibbley | R/R | 5 ft 9 in (1.75 m) | Fr | Moss Bluff, Louisiana |
| 17 | OF | Delaney Dunham | L/L | 5 ft 6 in (1.68 m) | So | Mont Belvieu, Texas |
| 18 | INF | Brilee Ford | R/R | 5 ft 5 in (1.65 m) | Fr | Hammond, Louisiana |
| 19 | U | Corine Poncho | R/R | 5 ft 8 in (1.73 m) | So | Basile, Louisiana |
| 19 | U | Corine Poncho | R/R | 5 ft 8 in (1.73 m) | So | Basile, Louisiana |
| 20 | INF | Molly Powell | R/R | 6 ft 1 in (1.85 m) | Fr | Nome, Texas |
| 21 | INF | Brylie Fontenot | R/R | 5 ft 3 in (1.6 m) | Fr | Moss Bluff, Louisiana |
| 22 | INF | Reese Reyna | R/R | 5 ft 3 in (1.6 m) | Jr | Santa Fe, Texas |
| 23 | C | Bella Perez | R/R | 5 ft 6 in (1.68 m) | Fr | Houston, Texas |
| 24 | LHP | Shaelyn Sanders | R/L | 5 ft 6 in (1.68 m) | Sr | Splendora, Texas |
| 25 | C | Chloe Gomez | R/R | 5 ft 2 in (1.57 m) | Sr | Spring, Texas |
| 26 | C | Kelsey Gaspard | R/R | 5 ft 5 in (1.65 m) | RS So | Roanoke, Louisiana |
| 27 | U | Samantha Mundine | L/R | 5 ft 4 in (1.63 m) | Fr | Luling, Texas |
| 32 | INF | Rylie Bouvier | L/R | 5 ft 7 in (1.7 m) | Jr | Santa Fe, Texas |
| 34 | C | Emily Phillips | R/R | 5 ft 9 in (1.75 m) | Sr | Chesapeake, Virginia |

Head coach

James Landreneau (McNeese State)

Assistant coach(es)

Shelbi Sunseri (LSU)
Alexis Otero (Quinnipiac/San Diego State
Alayis Seneca (McNeese)

Legend

- (C) Team captain
- (S) Suspended
- (I) Ineligible
- Injured
- Current redshirt

Roster
Last update: January 26, 2024

== Schedule and results ==
Legend
| | McNeese win |
| | McNeese loss |
| | Postponement/Cancellation |
| **Bold** | McNeese team member |
| * | Non-Conference game |
| † | Make-Up Game |

2024 McNeese Cowgirls softball game log
Regular season (40–20)

February (11–4)
| Date | Opponent | Rank | Site/stadium | Score | Win | Loss | Save | TV | Attendance | Overall record | SLC record |
|---|---|---|---|---|---|---|---|---|---|---|---|
| Feb. 8 | California* | | Joe Miller Field at Cowgirl Diamond • Lake Charles, LA | 2–5 | Anna Reimers (1–0) | **Sanders, Shaelyn (0–1)** | Randi Roelling (1) | | 876 | 0–1 | |
Cowgirl Classic
| Feb. 9 | New Mexico* | | Joe Miller Field at Cowgirl Diamond • Lake Charles, LA | 12–4; 6 inn | **Schexnayder, Ryann (1–0)** | SNOW, Taylor (0-0) | None | | 831 | 1–1 | |
| Feb. 10 | Tarleton State* | | Joe Miller Field at Cowgirl Diamond • Lake Charles, LA | 11–3 (5 inn) | **Vallejo, Ashley (1–0)** | Marquez, Kynlee (0-0) | None | | | 2–1 | |
| Feb. 10 | Tennessee State* | | Joe Miller Field at Cowgirl Diamond • Lake Charles, LA | 10–0 (5 inn) | **Sanders, Shaelyn (1-1)** | Ayala, Holly (0-0) | None | | 872 | 3–1 | |
| Feb. 11 | Tarleton State* | | Joe Miller Field at Cowgirl Diamond • Lake Charles, LA | 5–1 | **Lindsay Davis (1–0)** | Kendall Daniel (0–1) | None | | 719 | 4–1 | |
| Feb. 15 | Baylor* | 24 | Joe Miller Field at Cowgirl Diamond • Lake Charles, LA | 2–3 | RyLee Crandall (1–0) | **Sanders, Shaelyn (1–2)** | Aliyah Binford (1) | ESPN+ | 775 | 4–2 | |
Cowgirl Challenge
| Feb. 16 | Oklahoma* | 1 | Joe Miller Field at Cowgirl Diamond • Lake Charles, LA | 1–8 | Maxwell, Kelly (3–0) | **Davis, Lindsay (1-1)** | None | ESPN+ | 1,542 | 4–3 | |
| Feb. 17 | Central Arkansas* | | Joe Miller Field at Cowgirl Diamond • Lake Charles, LA | 14–0 (5 inn) | **Sanders, Shaelyn (2-2)** | Bailie Runner (1–3) | None | | | 5–3 | |
| Feb. 17 | Oklahoma* | 1 | Joe Miller Field at Cowgirl Diamond • Lake Charles, LA | 0–3 | May, Nicole (3–0) | **Davis, Lindsay (1–2)** | Maxwell, Kelly (1) | ESPN+ | 1,559 | 5–4 | |
| Feb. 18 | Lamar* | | Joe Miller Field at Cowgirl Diamond • Lake Charles, LA | 4–2 | **Schexnayder, Ryann (2–0)** | Wardlaw, Emma (1–2) | **Davis, Lindsay (1)** | | 1,116 | 6–4 | |
| Feb. 21 | Boise State* | | Joe Miller Field at Cowgirl Diamond • Lake Charles, LA | 4–1 | **Sanders, Shaelyn (3–2)** | CAUDILL, Taylor (5–2) | None | | 729 | 7–4 | |
| Feb. 23 | Niagara* | | Joe Miller Field at Cowgirl Diamond • Lake Charles, LA | 8–0 (5 inn) | **Schexnayder, Ryann (4–2)** | Hickingbottom, Maddi (0–1) | None | | | 8–4 | |
| Feb. 23 | North Dakota* | | Joe Miller Field at Cowgirl Diamond • Lake Charles, LA | 3–0 | **Davis, Lindsay (2-2)** | Carr, Makaela (2-2) | None | | 756 | 9–4 | |
| Feb. 24 | Niagara* | | Joe Miller Field at Cowgirl Diamond • Lake Charles, LA | 12–3 (5 inn) | **Dibbley, Alexis (1–0)** | Jackson, Sage (0–1) | None | | 703 | 10–4 | |
| Feb. 28 | Houston* | | Cougar Softball Stadium • Houston, TX | 6–5 (13 inn) | **Schexnayder, Ryann (4–0)** | Smith, S (6–2) | **Davis, Lindsay (2)** | ESPN+ | 451 | 11–4 | |

March (12–9)
| Date | Opponent | Rank | Site/stadium | Score | Win | Loss | Save | TV | Attendance | Overall record | SLC record |
LSU Purple and Gold Challenge
| Mar 1 | vs San Diego State* | | Tiger Park • Baton Rouge, LA | 5–4 | **Sanders, Shaelyn (4–2)** | HERNANDEZ, Dee Dee (2-2) | None | | 274 | 12–4 | |
| Mar 2 | vs Illinois* | | Tiger Park • Baton Rouge, LA | 0–3 | McQueen, Tori (3–2) | **Davis, Lindsay (2–3)** | None | SECN+ | 243 | 12–5 | |
| Mar 2 | at LSU* | 4 | Tiger Park • Baton Rouge, LA | 1–2 | Lynch (2–0) | **Sanders, Shaelyn (4–3)** | Berzon (3) | SECN+ | 2,576 | 12–6 | |
| Mar 3 | vs Louisiana Tech* | | Tiger Park • Baton Rouge, LA | 0–8 (6 inn) | FLOYD, Allie (5–1) | **Schexnayder, Ryann (4–1)** | None | | 497 | 12–7 | |
| Mar 3 | at LSU* | 4 | Tiger Park • Baton Rouge, LA | 1–2 | Berzon (6–0) | **Sanders, Shaelyn (4-4)** | None | SECN+ | | 12–8 | |
| Mar 5 | Louisiana Tech* | | Joe Miller Field at Cowgirl Diamond • Lake Charles, LA | 1–3 | BUSTER, Matt (1–0) | **Davis, Lindsay (2–4)** | MELNYCHUK, B (1) | | 1,401 | 12–9 | |
| Mar 6 | Houston* | | Joe Miller Field at Cowgirl Diamond • Lake Charles, LA | 5–9 | Smith, S (8–2) | **Sanders, Shaelyn (4–5)** | None | ESPN+ | 672 | 12–10 | |
| Mar 8 | Louisiana–Monroe* | | Joe Miller Field at Cowgirl Diamond • Lake Charles, LA | 3–1 | **Sanders, Shaelyn (5-5)** | Abrams, Victoria (6–3) | None | ESPN+ | | 13–10 | |
| Mar 8 | Louisiana–Monroe* | | Joe Miller Field at Cowgirl Diamond • Lake Charles, LA | 2–1 (9 inn) | **Sanders, Shaelyn (6–5)** | Nichols, Maddie (6–4) | None | ESPN+ | 734 | 14–10 | |
| Mar 9 | Louisiana–Monroe* | | Joe Miller Field at Cowgirl Diamond • Lake Charles, LA | 1–4 | Kassidy, Giddens (5–1) | **Davis, Lindsay (2–5)** | Hulett, Gianni (1) | ESPN+ | 736 | 14–11 | |
| Mar 13 | at Louisiana* | | Yvette Girouard Field at Lamson Park • Lafayette, LA | 1–2 | Landry, S (7–5) | **Sanders, Shaelyn (6-6)** | Riassetto (1) | ESPN+ | 1,438 | 14–12 | |
| Mar 15 | at Nicholls | | Swanner Field at Geo Surfaces Park • Thibodaux, LA | 4–1 | **Sanders, Shaelyn (7–6)** | McNeill, A. (7–8) | None | ESPN+ | 189 | 15–12 | 1–0 |
| Mar 16 | at Nicholls | | Swanner Field at Geo Surfaces Park • Thibodaux, LA | 0–1 | Yoo, M. (5–3) | **Schexnayder, Ryann (4–2)** | None | ESPN+ | 122 | 15–13 | 1–1 |
| Mar 16 | at Nicholls | | Swanner Field at Geo Surfaces Park • Thibodaux, LA | 2–0 | **Sanders, Shaelyn (8–6))** | McNeill, A. (7–9) | None | ESPN+ | 190 | 16–13 | 2–1 |
| Mar 22 | Incarnate Word | | Joe Miller Field at Cowgirl Diamond • Lake Charles, LA | 4–3 | **Sanders, Shaelyn (9–6)** | Larissa Jacquez (4-4) | **Schexnayder, Ryann (1)** | | 150 | 17–13 | 3–1 |
| Mar 23 | Incarnate Word | | Joe Miller Field at Cowgirl Diamond • Lake Charles, LA | 3–0 | **Davis, Lindsay (3–5)** | Samantha Portillo (3–2) | None | | | 18–13 | 4–1 |
| Mar 23 | Incarnate Word | | Joe Miller Field at Cowgirl Diamond • Lake Charles, LA | 11–6 | **Schexnayder, Ryann (5–2)** | Annie Gunther (3-3) | **Dibbley, Alexis (1)** | | 747 | 19–13 | 5–1 |
| Mar 26 | at South Alabama* | | Jaguar Field • Mobile, AL | 3–2 | **Sanders, Shaelyn(10–6)** | Ryley Harrison (4–3) | **Davis, Lindsay (3)** | ESPN+ | 346 | 20–13 | |
| Mar 28 | at Northwestern State | | Lady Demon Diamond • Natchitoches, LA | 10–8 | **Davis, Lindsay (4–5)** | Darr, M. (5–10) | **Schexnayder, Ryann (2)** | ESPN+ | 411 | 21–13 | 6–1 |
| Mar 29 | at Northwestern State | | Lady Demon Diamond • Natchitoches, LA | 7–1 | **Dibbley, Alexis (2–0)** | Seely, Kenzie (7–10) | None | ESPN+ | 452 | 22–13 | 7–1 |
| Mar 29 | at Northwestern State | | Lady Demon Diamond • Natchitoches, LA | 8–0 (5 inn) | **Sanders, Shaelyn (11–6)** | Darr, Maggie (5–11) | None | ESPN+ | 452 | 23–13 | 8–1 |

April (12–5)
| Date | Opponent | Rank | Site/stadium | Score | Win | Loss | Save | TV | Attendance | Overall record | SLC record |
|---|---|---|---|---|---|---|---|---|---|---|---|
| Apr 2 | at Florida State* | 18 | JoAnne Graf Field at the Seminole Softball Complex • Tallahassee, FL | 0–12 (5 inn) | M. Reid (9–1) | **Sanders, Shaelyn (11–7)** | None | ESPN+ | 567 | 23–14 | |
| Apr 3 | at Florida State* | 18 | JoAnne Graf Field at the Seminole Softball Complex • Tallahassee, FL | 0–8 (5 inn) | A. Danley (7–2) | **Dibbley, Alexis (2–1)** | None | ESPN+ | 523 | 23–15 | |
| Apr 5 | Lamar | | Joe Miller Field at Cowgirl Diamond • Lake Charles, LA | 7–0 | **Sanders, Shaelyn (12–7)** | Wardlaw, E. (9–3) | None | ESPN+ | 758 | 24–15 | 9–1 |
| Apr 6 | Lamar | | Joe Miller Field at Cowgirl Diamond • Lake Charles, LA | 6–2 | **Dibbley, Alexis (3–1)** | Mitchell, K. (10–4) | None | ESPN+ | | 25–15 | 10–1 |
| Apr 6 | Lamar | | Joe Miller Field at Cowgirl Diamond • Lake Charles, LA | 6–3 | **Davis, Lindsay (5-5)** | Mitchell, K. (10–5) | None | ESPN+ | 742 | 26–15 | 11–1 |
| Apr 12 | at Texas A&M–Commerce | | John Cain Family Softball Complex • Commerce, TX | 2–0 | **Sanders, Shaelyn (13–7)** | Sanchez, J. (4–10) | None | ESPN+ | | 27–15 | 12–1 |
| Apr 12 | at Texas A&M–Commerce | | John Cain Family Softball Complex • Commerce, TX | 14–2 (5 inn) | **Schexnayder, Ryann (6–3)** | Arredondo, A (0–6) | None | ESPN+ | 267 | 28–15 | 13–1 |
| Apr 13 | at Texas A&M–Commerce | | John Cain Family Softball Complex • Commerce, TX | 11–1 (5 inn) | **Sanders, Shaelyn (14–7)** | Sanchez, Julia (4–11) | None | ESPN+ | 127 | 29–15 | 14–1 |
| Apr 17 | Sam Houston* | | Joe Miller Field at Cowgirl Diamond • Lake Charles, LA | 4–2 | **Davis, Lindsay (6–5)** | Amy Abke (8-8) | **Sanders, Shaelyn (1)** | | 680 | 30–15 | |
| Apr 19 | Houston Christian | | Joe Miller Field at Cowgirl Diamond • Lake Charles, LA | 8–0 (5 inn) | **Sanders, Shaelyn (15–7)** | Grofman, Ronni (5–9) | None | ESPN+ | 727 | 31–15 | 15–1 |
| Apr 19 | Houston Christian | | Joe Miller Field at Cowgirl Diamond • Lake Charles, LA | 6–3 | **Dibbley, Alexis (4–1)** Swanson, Lyndie (6–7) | Sanders, Shaelyn (2) | ESPN+ | | 32–15 | 16–1 | |
| Apr 20 | Houston Christian | | Joe Miller Field at Cowgirl Diamond • Lake Charles, LA | 5–4 (9 inn) | **Sanders, Shaelyn (16–7)** | anes, Katy (4-4) | None | ESPN+ | 752 | 33–15 | 17–1 |
| Apr 24 | Louisiana* | 19 | Joe Miller Field at Cowgirl Diamond • Lake Charles, LA | 4–5 | Landry, S (18–7) | **Sanders, Shaelyn (16–8)** | Riassetto (6) | ESPN+ | 1,027 | 33–16 | |
| Apr 26 | at Texas A&M–Corpus Christi | | Chapman Field • Corpus Christi, TX | 1–0 (8 inn) | **Sanders, Shaelyn (17–8)** | Saenz, A. (2–5) | None | ESPN+ | 205 | 34–16 | 18–1 |
| Apr 26 | at Texas A&M–Corpus Christi | | Chapman Field • Corpus Christi, TX | 1–2 | Aholelei, P. (15–8) | **Sanders, Shaelyn (17–9)** | None | ESPN+ | 216 | 34–17 | 18–2 |
| Apr 27 | at Texas A&M–Corpus Christi | | Chapman Field • Corpus Christi, TX | 3–1 | **Sanders, Shaelyn (18–9)** | Aholelei, P. (15–9) | None | ESPN+ | 282 | 35–17 | 19–2 |
| Apr 30 | at Louisiana Tech* | | Lady Techster Softball Complex • Ruston, LA | 0–4 | MELNYCHUK, B (11–7) | **Dibbley, Alexis (4–2)** | None | ESPN+ | 558 | 35–18 | |

May (3–0)
| Date | Opponent | Rank | Site/stadium | Score | Win | Loss | Save | TV | Attendance | Overall record | SLC record |
|---|---|---|---|---|---|---|---|---|---|---|---|
| May 3 | Southeastern Louisiana | | Joe Miller Field at Cowgirl Diamond • Lake Charles, LA | 3–0 | **Sanders, Shaelyn (19–9)** | Brunson, Allison (3–1) | None | ESPN+ | 1,041 | 36–18 | 20–2 |
| May 3 | Southeastern Louisiana | | Joe Miller Field at Cowgirl Diamond • Lake Charles, LA | 5–3 | **Schexnayder, Ryann (7–2)** | DuBois, Ellie (13–5) | **Sanders, Shaelyn (3)** | ESPN+ | | 37–18 | 21–2 |
| May 4 | Southeastern Louisiana | | Joe Miller Field at Cowgirl Diamond • Lake Charles, LA | 6–2 | **Schexnayder, Ryann (8–2)** | Brunson, Allison (3–2) | None | ESPN+ | 912 | 38–18 | 22–2 |

Post-Season (2–2)

Southland Tournament (2–2)
| Date | Opponent | (Seed)/Rank | Site/stadium | Score | Win | Loss | Save | TV | Attendance | Overall record | Tournament record |
|---|---|---|---|---|---|---|---|---|---|---|---|
| May 8 | vs. (4) Incarnate Word | (1) | North Oak Park • Hammond, LA | 2–3 | Samantha Portillo(10–6) | **Sanders, Shaelyn(19–10)** | None | ESPN+ | 332 | 38–19 | 0–1 |
| May 8 | vs. (7) Houston Christian | (1) | North Oak Park • Hammond, LA | 8–6 | **Schexnayder, Ryann(9–2)** | Grofman, Ronni(6–10) | None | ESPN+ | 322 | 39–19 | 1–1 |
| May 9 | vs. (3) Nicholls | (1) | North Oak Park • Hammond, LA | 4–3 (8 inn) | **Sanders, Shaelyn (20–10)** | McNeill, A. (14–13) | None | ESPN+ | 520 | 40–19 | 2–1 |
| May 9 | vs. (4) Incarnate Word | (1) | North Oak Park • Hammond, LA | 7–8 (8 inn) | Samantha Portillo(11–6) | **Schexnayder, Ryann(9–3)** | None | ESPN+ | 322 | 40–20 | 2–2 |

Schedule source:*Rankings are based on the team's current ranking in the NFCA/USA Softball poll.

== Conference awards and honors ==
=== Post-season All-Southland Conference Teams ===
James Landreneau was named Coach of the Year. Shaelyn Sanders was named Pitcher of the Year, and Alexis Dibbley was named Freshman of the Year. Corine Poncho, Mariana Torres, Alexis Dibbley, and Shaelyn Sanders were named as first team members. Rylie Bouvier, Bella Perez, and Crislyne Moreno were named as second team members.

Player of the Year: Victoria Altamirano, UIW

Hitter of the Year: Ka'Lyn Watson, Southeastern

Pitcher of the Year: Shaelyn Sanders, McNeese

Freshman of the Year: Alexis Dibbley, McNeese

Newcomer of the Year: Shenita Tucker, Lamar

Coach of the Year: James Landreneau, McNeese

==== First Team ====
- Corine Poncho (MCNS, SO, 1st Base)
- Mariana Torres (MCNS, SR, 2nd Base)
- Chloe Magee (SELA, FR, Shortstop)
- Maddison Guillen (UIW, SR, 3rd Base)
- Bailey Krolczyk (SELA, SR, Catcher)
- Victoria Altamirano (UIW, SO, Utility)
- Audrey Greely (SELA, SR, Designated Player)
- Reagan Heflin (NICH, SO, Outfielder)
- Ka'Lyn Watson (SELA, SR, Outfielder)
- Alexis Dibbley (MCNS, FR, Outfielder)
- Cera Blanchard (SELA, SR, Pitcher)
- Shaelyn Sanders (MCNS, SR, Pitcher)

==== Second Team ====
- Lexi Johnson (SELA, SR, 1st Base)
- Ryleigh Mata (UIW, JR, 2nd Base)
- Baylee Lemons (UIW, JR, Shortstop)
- Rylie Bouvier (MCNS, JR, 3rd Base)
- Bella Perez (MCNS, FR, Catcher)
- Haylie Savage (HCU, JR, Utility)
- Crislyne Moreno (MCNS, JR, Designated Player)
- Jillian Guiterrez (UIW, SO, Outfield)
- Abby Andersen (NICH, SR, Outfield)
- Cam Goodman (SELA, SR, Outfield)
- Primrose Aholelei (TAMUCC, SR, Pitcher)
- Ellie DuBois (SELA, SR, Pitcher)

=== Weekly awards ===
Weekly honors
| Honors | Player | Position | Date Awarded | Ref. |
|---|---|---|---|---|
| SLC Pitcher of the Week | Shaelyn Sanders | RHP | March 18, 2024 | |
| SLC Pitcher of the Week | Shaelyn Sanders | RHP | April 22, 2024 | |

== See also ==
2024 McNeese Cowboys baseball team
