= 2024 Northwestern State Lady Demons softball team =

2024 Northwestern State Lady Demons softball
- Conference: Southland Conference
- Record: 19–31 (5–18 Southland)
- Head coach: Lacy Prejean (1st season)
- Assistant coaches: Lexi Smith; Melissa Mayeux
- Home stadium: Lady Demon Diamond

2024 Southland Conference softball standings
| | Conf. | | | | Overall |
| Team | W | | L | PCT | W | | L | PCT |
|---|---|---|---|---|---|---|---|---|
| McNeese ‍†‍‍ | 22 | – | 2 | .917 | 40 | – | 20 | .667 |
| Southeastern Louisiana ‍‍‡‍^{y} | 17 | – | 7 | .708 | 47 | – | 15 | .758 |
| Nicholls ‍‍‍ | 16 | – | 8 | .667 | 31 | – | 26 | .544 |
| Incarnate Word ‍‍‍ | 14 | – | 9 | .609 | 34 | – | 17 | .667 |
| Lamar ‍‍‍ | 12 | – | 12 | .500 | 26 | – | 25 | .510 |
| Texas A&M–Corpus Christi ‍‍‍ | 9 | – | 15 | .375 | 21 | – | 22 | .488 |
| Houston Christian ‍‍‍ | 9 | – | 15 | .375 | 23 | – | 27 | .460 |
| Northwestern State ‍‍‍ | 5 | – | 18 | .217 | 19 | – | 31 | .380 |
| Texas A&M–Commerce* ‍‍‍ | 2 | – | 22 | .083 | 9 | – | 45 | .167 |
† – Conference champion ‡ – Tournament champion y – Invited to the NCAA tournament * Ineligible for the 2024 NCAA tournament due to transition from Division II; As of May 19, 2024; Rankings from NFCA/USA Today

The 2024 Northwestern State Lady Demons softball team represented Northwestern State University during the 2024 NCAA Division I softball season. The Lady Demons played their home games at Lady Demon Diamond and were led by first year head coach Lacy Prejean. They are members of the Southland Conference. The team compiled a 19–31 overall record and a 5–18 record in conference play finishing in eighth place. They failed to qualify for the SLC tournament.

== Preseason ==
=== Southland Conference Coaches Poll ===
The Southland Conference Coaches Poll was released on February 2, 2024. Northwestern State was picked to finish sixth in the Southland Conference with 63 votes.

Coaches poll
| Predicted finish | Team | Votes (1st place) |
| 1 | McNeese State | 128 (16) |
| 2 | Southeastern Louisiana | 114 (2) |
| 3 | Nicholls | 97 |
| 4 | Lamar | 78 |
| 5 | Texas A&M–Corpus Christi | 72 |
| 6 | Northwestern State | 63 |
| 7 | Houston Christian | 49 |
| 8 | Incarnate Word | 30 |
| 9 | Texas A&M–Commerce | 17 |

=== Preseason All-Southland team ===
Ashlyn Walker, Laney Roos, and Maggie Darr were named to the conference preseason second team.

==== First Team ====
- Lexi Johnson (SELA, SR, 1st Base)
- Erin Kraus (NICH, SO, 2nd Base)
- Haylie Savage HCU, JR, 3rd Base)
- Reese Reyna (MCNS, JR, Shortstop)
- Bailey Krolczyk (SELA, SR, Catcher)
- Chloe Gomez (MCNS, SR, Utility)
- Audrey Greely (SELA, SR, Designated Player)
- Alexa Poche (NICH, SR, Outfielder)
- AB Garcia (HCU, SO, Outfielder)
- Erin Ardoin (MCNS, JR, Outfielder)
- Ashley Vallejo (MCNS, JR, Pitcher)
- Primrose Aholelei (TAMUCC, JR, Pitcher)

==== Second Team ====
- Crislyne Mareno (MCNS, JR, 1st Base)
- Mariana Torres (MCNS, JR, 2nd Base)
- Rylie Bouvier (MCNS, JR, 3rd Base)
- Brooke Davis (LU, SR, Shortstop)
- Ashlyn Walker (NWST, SR, Catcher)
- Sydney Hoyt (TAMUCC, SR, Utility)
- Cameron Niedenthal (LU, SR, Designated Player)
- Cam Goodman (SELU, SR, Outfielder)
- Ka'Lyn Watson (SELU, SR, Outfielder)
- Laney Roos (NWST, SR, Outfielder)
- Maggie Darr (NWST, SR, Pitcher)
- Shaelyn Sanders (MCNS, SR, Pitcher)

== Roster ==
2024 Northwestern State Lady Demons softball team
Players
Coaches

| # | Pos. | Name | Bats/throws | Height | Year | Home town |
|---|---|---|---|---|---|---|
| 1 | RHP | Skye Sharp | S/R | 5 ft 5 in (1.65 m) | Fr | McComb, Mississippi |
| 2 | OF | Camryn Ford | L/L | 5 ft 4 in (1.63 m) | So | Marthaville, Louisiana |
| 4 | C | Ashlyn Walker | R/R | 5 ft 10 in (1.78 m) | Sr | Saginaw, Texas |
| 5 | | Mia Liscano | L/R | 5 ft 6 in (1.68 m) | Fr | Buda, Texas |
| 7 | OF | Cameron Curtis | R/R | 5 ft 5 in (1.65 m) | Fr | Gloster, Louisiana |
| 8 | U | Kelsey Bunch | R/R | 5 ft 6 in (1.68 m) | Jr | Galveston, Texas |
| 9 | OF | Laney Roos | L/L | 5 ft 7 in (1.7 m) | Sr | Aubrey, Texas |
| 11 | RHP | Kenzie Seely | R/R | 5 ft 5 in (1.65 m) | Sr | Whitney, Texas |
| 12 | INF | Taylor Williams | L/R | 5 ft 3 in (1.6 m) | Sr | Tom Bean, Texas |
| 13 | C | Tristin Court | R/R | 6 ft 0 in (1.83 m) | Sr | Rockwall, Texas |
| 14 | INF | Kennedy Reynolds | R/R | 5 ft 6 in (1.68 m) | RS Jr | Spring, Texas |
| 15 | RHP | Nana Vences (redshirt) | R/R | 5 ft 10 in (1.78 m) | RS So | Marshall, Texas |
| 17 | INF | Kat Marshall | R/R | 5 ft 9 in (1.75 m) | Sr | Brenham, Texas |
| 18 | RHP | Rylie Denton | L/R | 5 ft 7 in (1.7 m) | Sr | Rotan, Texas |
| 19 | INF | Sophia Livers | R/R | 5 ft 0 in (1.52 m) | Fr | Bossier City, Louisiana |
| 21 | U | Ali Delafield | L/L | 5 ft 6 in (1.68 m) | Fr | Stonewall, Louisiana |
| 22 | OF | Bailie Ragsdale | L/R | 5 ft 5 in (1.65 m) | Jr | Lone Oak, Texas |
| 24 | RHP | Haley Parker (redshirt) | R/R | 5 ft 11 in (1.8 m) | RS So | Fort Worth, Texas |
| 28 | RHP | Maggie Darr | R/R | 6 ft 3 in (1.91 m) | Sr | Missouri City, Texas |
| 32 | C | Carissa Hernandez | R/R | 5 ft 3 in (1.6 m) | Fr | Lytle, Texas |
| 33 | C | Lexie Roos | R/R | 5 ft 8 in (1.73 m) | Sr | Aubrey, Texas |

Head coach

Lacy Prejean (University of Alabama)

Assistant coach(es)

Lexi Smith (Texas A&M)
Melissa Mayeux (University of Louisiana at Lafayette)

Legend

- (C) Team captain
- (S) Suspended
- (I) Ineligible
- Injured
- Current redshirt

Roster
Last update: February 1, 2024

== Schedule and results ==
Legend
| | Northwestern State win |
| | Northwestern State loss |
| | Postponement/Cancellation |
| **Bold** | Northwestern State team member |
| * | Non-Conference game |
| † | Make-Up Game |

2024 Northwestern State Lady Demons softball game log
Regular season (19–31)

February (9–10)
| Date | Opponent | Rank | Site/stadium | Score | Win | Loss | Save | TV | Attendance | Overall record | SLC record |
Texas State Tournament
| Feb. 8 | at Texas State* | | Bobcat Softball Stadium • San Marcos, TX | 0–7 | T. McCann (1-0) | **Seely, Kenzie (0-1)** | None | ESPN+ | 644 | 0–1 | |
| Feb. 8 | vs. UTSA* | | Bobcat Softball Stadium • San Marcos, TX | 8–2 | **Darr, Maggie (1-0)** | R. Smith (0-1) | None | | 644 | 1–1 | |
| Feb. 9 | vs. Creighton* | | Bobcat Softball Stadium • San Marcos, TX | 1–2 | Puchino (1-0) | Seely, Kenzie (0-2) | None | | 806 | 1–2 | |
| Feb. 10 | vs. Southern Illinois* | | Bobcat Softball Stadium • San Marcos, TX | 6–3 | **Delafield, Aly (1-0)** | Madi Eberle (0-1) | None | | | 2– 2 | |
| Feb. 10 | vs. Kennesaw State* | | Bobcat Softball Stadium • San Marcos, TX | 0–1 | HILLEARY, Kenley (2-0) | **Darr, Maggie (1-1)** | None | | | 2–3 | |
| Feb. 13 | at Stephen F. Austin* | | Jaycees Field • Nacogdoches, TX | 3–4 (9 inn) | A. Telford (1-2) | **Delafield, Aly (1-1)** | None | | 102 | 2–4 | |
| Feb. 13 | at Stephen F. Austin* | | Jaycees Field • Nacogdoches, TX | 1–0 | **Seely, Kenzie (1-2)** | A. Brown (0-1) | None | | 215 | 3–4 | |
Houston Classic
| Feb. 16 | vs. UTSA* | | Cougar Softball Stadium • Houston, TX | 3–1 | Seely, K. (2-2) | **Parker, Haley (0-2)** | None | | | 4–4 | |
| Feb. 17 | vs. UMass* | | Cougar Softball Stadium • Houston, TX | 3–2 | **Darr, Maggie (2-1)** | Horton, N. (1-2) | **Delafield, Aly (1)** | | | 5–4 | |
| Feb. 17 | vs. UTSA* | | Cougar Softball Stadium • Houston, TX | 1–5 | I. Saucedo (1-0) | **Denton, Ryleigh (0-1)** | None | | | 5–5 | |
| Feb. 18 | at Houston* | | Cougar Softball Stadium • Houston, TX | 7–8 | S. Smith (5-0) | **Seely, Kenzie (2-3)** | None | ESPN+ | | 5–6 | |
| Feb. 18 | at Houston* | | Cougar Softball Stadium • Houston, TX | 0–13 (5 inn) | P. Lehman (3-0) | **Darr, Maggie (2-2)** | None | ESPN+ | 488 | 5–7 | |
Best on the Bayou
| Feb. 22 | at Louisiana–Monroe* | | Geo-Surfaces Field at the ULM Softball Complex • Monroe, LA | 3–11 (5 inn) | Abrams, Victoria (4-1) | **Seely, Kenzie (2-4)** | None | | 430 | 5–8 | |
| Feb. 23 | vs. Evansville* | | Geo-Surfaces Field at the ULM Softball Complex • Monroe, LA | 3–0 | **Darr, Maggie (3-2)** | Jolly (0-3) | None | | 138 | 6–8 | |
| Feb. 23 | vs. Sam Houston* | | Geo-Surfaces Field at the ULM Softball Complex • Monroe, LA | 4–2 (8 inn) | **Seely, Kenzie (3-4)** | Abke, A. (2-1) | None | | 233 | 7–8 | |
| Feb. 24 | vs. Sam Houston* | | Geo-Surfaces Field at the ULM Softball Complex • Monroe, LA | 1–7 | Daryn Grams (2-1) | **Darr, Maggie (3-3)** | None | | 166 | 7–9 | |
| Feb. 24 | vs. Syracuse Orange* | | Geo-Surfaces Field at the ULM Softball Complex • Monroe, LA | 11–8 | **Denton, Ryleigh (1-1)** | Verni (1-2) | **Seely, Kenzie (1)** | | 224 | 8–9 | |
| Feb. 27 | Stephen F. Austin* | | Lady Demon Diamond • Natchitoches, LA | 3–4 (9 inn) | A. Telford (1-2) | **Delafield, Aly (1-1)** | Nine | ESPN+ | 102 | 9–9 | |
| Feb. 27 | Stephen F. Austin* | | Lady Demon Diamond • Natchitoches, LA | 1–0 | **Seely, Kenzie (1-2)** | A. Brown (0-1) | None | ESPN+ | 215 | 9–10 | |

March (5–13)
| Date | Opponent | Rank | Site/stadium | Score | Win | Loss | Save | TV | Attendance | Overall record | SLC record |
Longhorn Invitational
| Mar 1 | vs. Hofstra* | | Red and Charline McCombs Field • Austin, TX | 1–0 (8 inn) | **Darr, Maggie (4-4)** | Apsel, J (1-1) | None | LHN | | 10–10 | |
| Mar 1 | at Texas* | 2 | Red and Charline McCombs Field • Austin, TX | 2–10 (5 inn) | Morgan (4-0) | Seely, Kenzie (4-5) | None | LHN | 1,812 | 10–11 | |
| Mar 2 | vs. Tarleton State* | | Red and Charline McCombs Field • Austin, TX | 8–2 | **Seely, Kenzie (5-5)** | Marquez, K (1-4) | None | | | 11–11 | |
| Mar 3 | vs. Penn State* | | Red and Charline McCombs Field • Austin, TX | 2–3 | M Volpe (4-0) | **Darr, Maggie (4-5)** | None | LHN | 203 | 11–12 | |
| Mar 9 | Nicholls | | Lady Demon Diamond • Natchitoches, LA | 5–9 | Yoo, Molly (4-3) | **Seely, Kenzie (5-6)** | Paden, Averi (1) | ESPN+ | 228 | 11–13 | 0–1 |
| Mar 9 | Nicholls | | Lady Demon Diamond • Natchitoches, LA | 0–5 | McNeill, Audrey (6-6) | **Darr, Maggie (4-6)** | None | ESPN+ | 218 | 11–14 | 0–2 |
| Mar 10 | Nicholls | | Lady Demon Diamond • Natchitoches, LA | 0–2 | McNeill, Audrey (7-6) | **Seely, Kenzie (5-7)** | None | ESPN+ | 204 | 11–15 | 0–3 |
| Mar 12 | at Louisiana Tech* | | Lady Techster Softball Complex • Ruston, LA | 1–2 | FLOYD, Allie (7-1) | **Seely, Kenzie (5-8)** | None | ESPN+ | 617 | 11–16 | |
| Mar 15 | at Lamar | | Lamar Softball Complex • Beaumont, TX | 5–6 | Mitchell, Karyana (8-0) | **Seely, Kenzie (5-9)** | None | ESPN+ | 500 | 11–17 | 0–4 |
| Mar 15 | at Lamar | | Lamar Softball Complex • Beaumont, TX | 6–1 | **Darr, Maggie (5-6)** | Mitchell, Karyana (8-1) | None | ESPN+ | 400 | 12–17 | 1–4 |
| Mar 16 | at Lamar | | Lamar Softball Complex • Beaumont, TX | 2–6 | Wardlaw, Emma (6-2 | **Darr, Maggie (5-7)** | None | ESPN+ | 500 | 12–18 | 1–5 |
| Mar 19 | Texas Southern* | | Lady Demon Diamond • Natchitoches, LA | 2–1 | **Seely, Kenzie (6-9)** | Maren Berger (2-3) | None | ESPN+ | 205 | 13–18 | |
| Mar 23 | at Texas A&M–Corpus Christi | | Chapman Field • Corpus Christi, TX | 2–6 | Aholelei, Primrose (10-5) | **Darr, Maggie (5-8)** | None | ESPN+ | 150 | 13–19 | 1–6 |
| Mar 23 | at Texas A&M–Corpus Christi | | Chapman Field • Corpus Christi, TX | 7–4 | **Seely, Kenzie (7-9)** | Williams, Malia (3-2) | **Darr, Maggie (1)** | ESPN+ | 150 | 14–19 | 2–6 |
| Mar 24 | at Texas A&M–Corpus Christi | | Chapman Field • Corpus Christi, TX | 0–3 | Aholelei, Primrose (11-5) | **Darr, Maggie (5-9)** | None | ESPN+ | 120 | 14–20 | 2–7 |
| Mar 28 | McNeese | | Lady Demon Diamond • Natchitoches, LA | 8–10 | Davis, Lindsay (4-5) | **Darr, Maggie (5-10)** | Schexnayder, Ryann (2) | ESPN+ | 411 | 14–21 | 2–8 |
| Mar 29 | McNeese | | Lady Demon Diamond • Natchitoches, LA | 1–7 | Dibbley, Alexis (2-0) | **Seely, Kenzie (7-10)** | None | ESPN+ | 452 | 14–22 | 2–9 |
| Mar 29 | McNeese | | Lady Demon Diamond • Natchitoches, LA | 0–8 (5 inn) | Sanders, Shaelyn (11-6) | Darr, Maggie (5-11) | None | ESPN+ | 452 | 14–23 | 2–10 |

April (4–7)
| Date | Opponent | Rank | Site/stadium | Score | Win | Loss | Save | TV | Attendance | Overall record | SLC record |
|---|---|---|---|---|---|---|---|---|---|---|---|
| Apr 12 | at Southeastern Louisiana | | North Oak Park • Hammond, LA | 4–5 | DuBois, Ellie (12-3) | **Seely, Kenzie (7-11)** | None | ESPN+ | 245 | 14–24 | 2–11 |
| Apr 12 | at Southeastern Louisiana | | North Oak Park • Hammond, LA | 1–5 | Blanchard, C (14-2) | **Darr, Maggie (5-12)** | None | ESPN+ | 245 | 14–25 | 2–12 |
| Apr 13 | at Southeastern Louisiana | | North Oak Park • Hammond, LA | 4–8 | Blanchard, C (15-2) | **Darr, Maggie (5-13)** | None | ESPN+ | 174 | 14–26 | 2–13 |
| Apr 19 | Texas A&M–Commerce | | Lady Demon Diamond • Natchitoches, LA | 1–2 | Sanchez, Julia (5-12) | **Seely, Kenzie (7-12)** | None | ESPN+ | 389 | 14–27 | 2–14 |
| Apr 19 | Texas A&M–Commerce | | Lady Demon Diamond • Natchitoches, LA | 6–0 | **Darr, Maggie (6-13)** | Arredondo, Anissa (0-7) | None | ESPN+ | 385 | 15–27 | 3–14 |
| Apr 20 | Texas A&M–Commerce | | Lady Demon Diamond • Natchitoches, LA | 3–2 | **Seely, Kenzie (8-12)** | Sanchez, Julia (5-13) | None | ESPN+ | 226 | 16–27 | 4–14 |
| Apr 23 | Louisiana Tech* | | Lady Demon Diamond • Natchitoches, LA | 8–6 | **Denton, Ryleigh (2-1)** | MENZINA, Lauren (2-1) | None | ESPN+ | 349 | 17–27 | |
| Apr 24 | Texas Southern | | Memorial Park • Houston, TX | – | (-) | **Cancelled** | | | | – | |
| Apr 26 | at Houston Christian | | Husky Field • Houston, TX | 2–6 | Swanson, L. (7-7) | **Darr, Maggie (6-14)** | None | | 200 | 17–28 | 4–15 |
| Apr 26 | at Houston Christian | | Husky Field • Houston, TX | 0–2 | Grofman, R. (6-9) | **Seely, Kenzie (8-13)** | None | | 200 | 17–29 | 4–16 |
| Apr 27 | at Houston Christian | | Husky Field • Houston, TX | 0–2 | Janes, K. (5-4) | **Seely, Kenzie (8-14)** | None | ESPN+ | 300 | 17–30 | 4–17 |
| Apr 30 | Grambling* | | Lady Demon Diamond • Natchitoches, LA | 8–3 | **Darr, Maggie (9-14)** | Erin Gibbs (4-9) | None | ESPN+ | 385 | 18–30 | |

May (1–1)
| Date | Opponent | Rank | Site/stadium | Score | Win | Loss | Save | TV | Attendance | Overall record | SLC record |
|---|---|---|---|---|---|---|---|---|---|---|---|
| May 3 | Incarnate Word | | Lady Demon Diamond • Natchitoches, LA | 2–6 | Larissa Jacquez (11-5) | **Darr, Maggie (7-15)** | None | ESPN+ | 388 | 18–31 | 4–18 |
| May 3 | Incarnate Word | | Lady Demon Diamond • Natchitoches, LA | 1–0 | **Seely, Kenzie (9-14)** | Samantha Portillo (8-6) | None | ESPN+ | 388 | 19–31 | 5–18 |
| May 4 | Incarnate Word | | Lady Demon Diamond • Natchitoches, LA | | | **Cancelled** | | | | – | – |

Schedule source:*Rankings are based on the team's current ranking in the NFCA/USA Softball poll.

== Conference awards and honors ==
=== Post-season All-Southland Conference Teams ===
No Lady Demons were selected to post season teams.

Player of the Year: Victoria Altamirano, UIW

Hitter of the Year: Ka'Lyn Watson, Southeastern

Pitcher of the Year: Shaelyn Sanders, McNeese

Freshman of the Year: Alexis Dibbley, McNeese

Newcomer of the Year: Shenita Tucker, Lamar

Coach of the Year: James Landreneau, McNeese

==== First Team ====
- Corine Poncho (MCNS, SO, 1st Base)
- Mariana Torres (MCNS, SR, 2nd Base)
- Chloe Magee (SELA, FR, Shortstop)
- Maddison Guillen (UIW, SR, 3rd Base)
- Bailey Krolczyk (SELA, SR, Catcher)
- Victoria Altamirano (UIW, SO, Utility)
- Audrey Greely (SELA, SR, Designated Player)
- Reagan Heflin (NICH, SO, Outfielder)
- Ka'Lyn Watson (SELA, SR, Outfielder)
- Alexis Dibbley (MCNS, FR, Outfielder)
- Cera Blanchard (SELA, SR, Pitcher)
- Shaelyn Sanders (MCNS, SR, Pitcher)

==== Second Team ====
- Lexi Johnson (SELA, SR, 1st Base)
- Ryleigh Mata (UIW, JR, 2nd Base)
- Baylee Lemons (UIW, JR, Shortstop)
- Rylie Bouvier (MCNS, JR, 3rd Base)
- Bella Perez (MCNS, FR, Catcher)
- Haylie Savage (HCU, JR, Utility)
- Crislyne Moreno (MCNS, JR, Designated Player)
- Jillian Guiterrez (UIW, SO, Outfield)
- Abby Andersen (NICH, SR, Outfield)
- Cam Goodman (SELA, SR, Outfield)
- Primrose Aholelei (TAMUCC, SR, Pitcher)
- Ellie DuBois (SELA, SR, Pitcher)

=== Weekly awards ===
Weekly honors
| Honors | Player | Position | Date Awarded | Ref. |
|---|---|---|---|---|
| SLC Softball Pitcher of the week | Kenzie Seely | RHP | March 4, 2024 | |

== See also ==
2024 Northwestern State Demons baseball team
