= 2024 Southeastern Louisiana Lady Lions softball team =

American college softball season

2024 Southeastern Louisiana Lady Lions softball

Southland Tournament champion

NCAA Tuscaloosa Regional
- Conference: Southland Conference
- Record: 47–15 (17–7 Southland)
- Head coach: Rick Fremin (9th season)
- Assistant coaches: Katie Godwin; Alana Fremin; Adam Kirkpatrick
- Home stadium: North Oak Park

2024 Southland Conference softball standings
	Conf.				Overall
Team	W		L	PCT	W		L	PCT
McNeese ‍†‍‍	22	–	2	.917	40	–	20	.667
Southeastern Louisiana ‍‍‡‍^{y}	17	–	7	.708	47	–	15	.758
Nicholls ‍‍‍	16	–	8	.667	31	–	26	.544
Incarnate Word ‍‍‍	14	–	9	.609	34	–	17	.667
Lamar ‍‍‍	12	–	12	.500	26	–	25	.510
Texas A&M–Corpus Christi ‍‍‍	9	–	15	.375	21	–	22	.488
Houston Christian ‍‍‍	9	–	15	.375	23	–	27	.460
Northwestern State ‍‍‍	5	–	18	.217	19	–	31	.380
Texas A&M–Commerce* ‍‍‍	2	–	22	.083	9	–	45	.167
† – Conference champion ‡ – Tournament champion y – Invited to the NCAA tournament * Ineligible for the 2024 NCAA tournament due to transition from Division II; As of May 19, 2024; Rankings from NFCA/USA Today

The 2024 Southeastern Louisiana Lady Lions softball team represented Southeastern Louisiana University during the 2024 NCAA Division I softball season. The Lady Lions played their home games at North Oak Park in Hammond, LA and were led by ninth-year head coach Rick Fremin. They are members of the Southland Conference. They compiled a 47–15 overall record including a 17–7 record in conference play and a regular season second place finish. The Lady Lions won the Southland Conference tournament for the first time in program history. Earning the conference's auto-bid to the 2024 NCAA Division I softball tournament, the team competed in the NCAA Division I tournament's Tuscaloosa regional. The team had a 2–2 record defeating 23rd ranked Clemson twice and losing to 14th ranked Alabama twice. Their season ended with a loss to Alabama in the regional finals round.

== Preseason ==
=== Southland Conference Coaches Poll ===
The Southland Conference Coaches Poll was released on February 2, 2024. Southeastern Louisiana was picked to finish second in the Southland Conference with 114 overall votes and two first place votes.

Coaches poll
Predicted finish	Team	Votes (1st place)
1	McNeese State	128 (16)
2	Southeastern Louisiana	114 (2)
3	Nicholls	97
4	Lamar	78
5	Texas A&M–Corpus Christi	72
6	Northwestern State	63
7	Houston Christian	49
8	Incarnate Word	30
9	Texas A&M–Commerce	17

=== Preseason All-Southland team ===
Lexi Johnson, Bailey Krolczyk, and Audrey Greely were named to the conference preseason first team. Cam Goodman and Ka'Lyn Watson were named to the conference preseason second team.

==== First Team ====
- Lexi Johnson (SELA, SR, 1st Base)
- Erin Kraus (NICH, SO, 2nd Base)
- Haylie Savage HCU, JR, 3rd Base)
- Reese Reyna (MCNS, JR, Shortstop)
- Bailey Krolczyk (SELA, SR, Catcher)
- Chloe Gomez (MCNS, SR, Utility)
- Audrey Greely (SELA, SR, Designated Player)
- Alexa Poche (NICH, SR, Outfielder)
- AB Garcia (HCU, SO, Outfielder)
- Erin Ardoin (MCNS, JR, Outfielder)
- Ashley Vallejo (MCNS, JR, Pitcher)
- Primrose Ahoelei (TAMUCC, JR, Pitcher)

==== Second Team ====
- Crislyne Mareno (MCNS, JR, 1st Base)
- Mariana Torres (MCNS, JR, 2nd Base)
- Rylie Bouvier (MCNS, JR, 3rd Base)
- Brooke Davis (LU, SR, Shortstop)
- Ashlyn Walker (NWST, SR, Catcher)
- Sydney Hoyt (TAMUCC, SR, Utility)
- Cameron Niedenthal (LU, SR, Designated Player)
- Cam Goodman (SELU, SR, Outfielder)
- Ka'Lyn Watson (SELU, SR, Outfielder)
- Laney Roos (NWST, SR, Outfielder)
- Maggie Darr (NWST, SR, Pitcher)
- Shaelyn Sanders (MCNS, SR, Pitcher)

== Personnel ==
2024 Southeastern Louisiana Lady Lions softball team
Players
Coaches

#	Pos.	Name	Bats/throws	Height	Year	Home town
00	OF	Brilee Broussard	/	5 ft 4 in (1.63 m)	Jr	Tickfaw, Louisiana
1	P	Allison Brunson	/	5 ft 8 in (1.73 m)	Jr	Jena, Louisiana
2	P	Chloe Bennett	/	5 ft 5 in (1.65 m)	Jr	Rosepine, Louisiana
3	OF	Addison Contorno	/	5 ft 3 in (1.6 m)	Fr	Livingston, Louisiana
4	INF	Lexi Johnson	/	5 ft 6 in (1.68 m)	Sr	Reserve, Louisiana
5	INF	Mykail Lusco	/	5 ft 8 in (1.73 m)	Fr	Harahan, Louisiana
7	INF	Maddie Watson	/	5 ft 6 in (1.68 m)	Jr	Baton Rouge, Louisiana
8	OF	Maddie Leal	/	5 ft 9 in (1.75 m)	Sr	Houston, Texas
9	U	Faith Kivett	/	5 ft 6 in (1.68 m)	Jr	Tallulah, Louisiana
10	P	Mary-Cathryn Comeaux	/	5 ft 5 in (1.65 m)	Sr	Port Allen, Louisiana
11	INF	Ellie DuBois	/	6 ft 0 in (1.83 m)	Sr	Shreveport, Louisiana
12	OF	Audrey Greely	/	5 ft 9 in (1.75 m)	Sr	Geismar, Louisiana
13	INF	Maria Detillier	/	5 ft 5 in (1.65 m)	So	Gramercy, Louisiana
14	P	Cera Blanchard	/	5 ft 7 in (1.7 m)	Sr	Metairie, Louisiana
15	C	Bailey Krolczyk	/	6 ft 0 in (1.83 m)	Sr	Corpus Christi, Texas
16	INF	Chloe Magee	/	5 ft 6 in (1.68 m)	Fr	Watson, Louisiana
17	OF	Cam Goodman	/	5 ft 1 in (1.55 m)	Sr	Marrero, Louisiana
18	U	Gabby Mitchell	/	5 ft 8 in (1.73 m)	Fr	Eunice, Louisiana
19	INF	Sadie Hewitt	/	5 ft 5 in (1.65 m)	Sr	Forney, Texas
22	C	Sophia Stoddard	/	5 ft 5 in (1.65 m)	Sr	Bountiful, Utah
24	P	Leah Marshall	/	5 ft 11 in (1.8 m)	Jr	Mississauga, Canada
25	OF	Breanna Fontenot	/	5 ft 3 in (1.6 m)	Fr	Moss Bluff, Louisiana
26	OF	Colleen Kulivan	/	5 ft 7 in (1.7 m)	So	Covington, Louisiana
27	P	Lainee Bailey	/	5 ft 8 in (1.73 m)	Fr	Walker, Louisiana
30	OF	Ka'Lyn Watson	/	5 ft 8 in (1.73 m)	Sr	Missouri City, Texas
31	OF	Ariel Gomez	/	5 ft 5 in (1.65 m)	Jr	Spring, Texas

Head coach

Rick Fremin (Jackson State)

Assistant coach(es)

Katie Godwin (Southeastern Louisiana)
Alana Fremin (Belhaven)
Adam Kirkpatrick

Legend

- (C) Team captain
- (S) Suspended
- (I) Ineligible
- Injured
- Current redshirt

Roster
Last update: February 1, 2024

== Schedule and results ==
Legend
	Southeastern Louisiana win
	Southeastern Louisiana loss
	Postponement/Cancellation
**Bold**	Southeastern Louisiana team member
*	Non-Conference game
†	Make-Up Game

2024 Southeastern Louisiana Lady Lions softball game log
Regular season (47–15)

February (12–3)
Date	Opponent	Rank	Site/stadium	Score	Win	Loss	Save	TV	Attendance	Overall record	SLC record
2024 Mardi Gras Mambo
Feb. 8	vs. Green Bay*		Youngsville Sports Complex • Youngsville, LA	13–0	**Blanchard, Cera (1-0)**	Paeton Kring (0-1)	None		115	1–0	
Feb. 9	vs. Providence College*		Youngsville Sports Complex • Youngsville, LA	2–0	**DuBois, Ellie (1-0)**	Riley Quirk (0-1)	**Bennett, Chloe (1)**		232	2–0	
Feb. 9	vs. UT Arlington*		Youngsville Sports Complex • Youngsville, LA	3–0	**Comeaux, Mary-Cathryn (MC) (1-0)**	Hoelscher, Emily (0-1)	Blanchard, Cera (1)		234	3–0	
Feb. 10	vs. Montana*		Youngsville Sports Complex • Youngsville, LA	5–0	**Bennett, Chloe (1-0)**	Brinka, Emmalyn (1-1)	None		345	4–0	
Feb. 10	vs. North Dakota*		Youngsville Sports Complex • Youngsville, LA	8–0	**DuBois, Ellie (2-0)**	Camryn Lasot (0-0)	None		345	5–0	
Feb. 14	at Louisiana Tech*		Lady Techster Softball Complex • Ruston, LA	1–4	FLOYD, Allie (1-0)	**Bennett, Chloe (1-1)**	None		607	5–1	
2024 Lion Classic
Feb. 16	Syracuse*		North Oak Park • Hammond, LA	8–6	**Blanchard, Cera (2-0)**	Verni, Julianna (1-1)	None		186	6–1	
Feb. 17	Maryland*		North Oak Park • Hammond, LA	4–1	**DuBois, Ellie (3-0)**	Courtney Wyche (1-3)			235	7–1	
Feb. 17	Southeast Missouri State*		North Oak Park • Hammond, LA	10–2	**DuBois, Ellie (4-0)**	KELL, Delaney (1-1)	None			8–1	
Feb. 20	South Alabama*		North Oak Park • Hammond, LA	1–9 (6 inn)	Olivia Lackie (6–1)	**DuBois, Ellie (4–1)**	None	ESPN+	312	8–2	
2024 Texas A&M Invitational
Feb. 22	vs. UTSA*		Davis Diamond • College Station, TX	8–0 (5 inn)	**Blanchard, Cera (3-0)**	GILBERT (1-3)	None			9–2	southeas
Feb. 22	at Texas A&M*		Davis Diamond • College Station, TX	1–4	Ackerman, Shaylee (3-0)	**Comeaux, Mary-Cathryn (MC) (1-1)**	None	SECN+	1,579	9–3	
Feb. 23	vs. St. Thomas*		Davis Diamond • College Station, TX	5–2	**Comeaux, Mary-Cathryn (MC) (2-1)**	Morgan Klein (0-2)	None			10–3	
Feb. 23	vs. North Dakota State*		Davis Diamond • College Station, TX	5–1	**Blanchard, Cera (4-0)**	Savy Williams (1-3)	None			11–3	
Feb. 24	vs. St. Thomas*		Davis Diamond • College Station, TX	9–1	**Bennett, Chloe (2-1)**	Christina Crawford (0-6)	None			12–3	

March (16–4)
Date	Opponent	Rank	Site/stadium	Score	Win	Loss	Save	TV	Attendance	Overall record	SLC record
Ole Miss Classic
Mar 1	vs. Kent State*		Ole Miss Softball Complex • Oxford, MS	4–5	NUECHTERLEIN (5-1)	**DuBois, Ellie (4-2)**	IRELAN (2)			12–4	
Mar 1	at Ole Miss*		Ole Miss Softball Complex • Oxford, MS	0–2	M. Klietherm (6-1)	**Blanchard, Cera (4-1)**	A. Furbush (3)	SECN+	400	12–5	
Mar 2	at UAB*		Ole Miss Softball Complex • Oxford, MS	4–1	**DuBois, Ellie (5-2)**	Leigha Kirby (3-5)	None		78	13–5	
Mar 2	at Ole Miss*		Ole Miss Softball Complex • Oxford, MS	9–4	**Brunson, Allison (1-0)**	Catelyn Riley (1-2)	None	SECN+	400	14–5	
Mar 3	vs. Kent State*		Ole Miss Softball Complex • Oxford, MS	6–5	**Blanchard, Cera (5-1)**	NUECHTERLEIN, Megan (5-3)	None		47	15–5	
Mar 6	Southern Miss*		North Oak Park • Hammond, LA	6–2	**Blanchard, Cera (6-1)**	Loganne Stepp (2-3)	None	ESPN+	188	16–5	
Mar 9	Incarnate Word		North Oak Park • Hammond, LA	4–3	**Brunson, Allison (2-0)**	Annie Gunther (2-1)	**Blanchard, Cera (2)**	ESPN+	160	17–5	1–0
Mar 9	Incarnate Word		North Oak Park • Hammond, LA	2–0	**Blanchard, Cera (7-1)**	Larissa Jacquez (3-3)	None	ESPN+	160	18–5	2–0
Mar 10	Incarnate Word		North Oak Park • Hammond, LA	3–6	Bella Mitchell (4-0)	**Comeaux, Mary-Cathryn (MC) (2-2)**	Larissa Jacquez (1)		151	18–6	2–1
Mar 15	Texas A&M–Commsoutheaserce		John Cain Family Softball Complex • Commerce, TX	14–0 (5 inn)	**Blanchard, Cera (8-1)**	Arredondo, Anissa (0-4)	None	ESPN+		19–6	3–1
Mar 15	Texas A&M–Commerce		John Cain Family Softball Complex • Commerce, TX	17–0 (5 inn)	**DuBois, Ellie (6-2)**	Muller, Maddie (2-10)	None	ESPN+	202	20–6	4–1
Mar 16	Texas A&M–Commerce		John Cain Family Softball Complex • Commerce, TX	14–1	**Blanchard, Cera (9-1)**	Muller, Maddie (2-11)	None	ESPN+	87	21–6	5–1
Mar 20	at Louisiana–Monroe*		Geo-Surfaces Field at the ULM Softball Complex • Monroe, LA	3–2	**DuBois, Ellie (7-2)**	Abrams, Victoria (7-5)	**Blanchard, Cera (3)**			22–6	
Mar 22	Houston Christian		North Oak Park • Hammond, LA	9–1	**Blanchard, Cera (10-1)**	Swanson, Lyndie (4-3)	None	ESPN+	205	23–6	6–1
Mar 22	Houston Christian		North Oak Park • Hammond, LA	2–3 southeas	Grofman, Ronni (4-5)	**DuBois, Ellie (7-3)**	None	ESPN+	205	23–7	6–2
Mar 23	Houston Christian		North Oak Park • Hammond, LA	4–0	**DuBois, Ellie (8-3)**	Janes, Katy (4-2)	None	ESPN+	127	24–7	7–2
Mar 27	at Pacific*		Bill Simoni Field • Stockton, CA	6–3	**Bennett, Chloe (3-1)**	Lloyd, Scarlett (3-3)	**Blanchard, Cera (2)**	ESPN+	103	25–7	
Mar 27	at Pacific*		Bill Simoni Field • Stockton, CA	11–2	**Comeaux, Mary-Cathryn (MC) (3-2)**	Strong, Vanessa (0-7)	None	ESPN+	59	26–7	
Mar 28	at Pacific*		Bill Simoni Field • Stockton, CA	5–3	**Brunson, Allison (3-0)**	Smith, Desiree (2-6)	**Comeaux, Mary-Cathryn (MC) (1)**	ESPN+	57	27–7	
Mar 28	at Santa Clara*		SCU Softball Field • Santa Clara, CA	10–2	**DuBois, Ellie (9-3)**	VALDEZ, Alaina (3-3)	None	ESPN+	71	28–7	
Mar 29	at Santa Clara*		SCU Softball Field • Santa Clara, CA			Cancelled					

April (14–3)
Date	Opponent	Rank	Site/stadium	Score	Win	Loss	Save	TV	Attendance	Overall record	SLC record
Apr 2	Jackson State*		North Oak Park • Hammond, LA	8–1	**DuBois, Ellie (10-3)**	Gonzalez, Sofia (3-5)	None	ESPN+	151	29–7	
Apr 2	Jackson State*		North Oak Park • Hammond, LA	4–2	**Blanchard, Cera (11-1)**	Salazar, Victoria (9-5)	**Comeaux, Mary-Cathryn (MC) (2)**	ESPN+	151	30–7	
Apr 5	at Texas A&M–Corpus Christi		Chapman Field • Corpus Christi, TX	3–0	**Blanchard, Cera (12-1)**	Aholelei, Primrose (13-6)	**Comeaux, Mary-Cathryn (MC) (3)**	ESPN+	178	31–7	8–2
Apr 5	at Texas A&M–Corpus Christi		Chapman Field • Corpus Christi, TX	9–2	**DuBois, Ellie (11-3)**	Saenz, Ariella (2-3)	**Brunson, Allison (1)**	ESPN+	180	32–7	9–2
Apr 6	at Texas A&M–Corpus Christi		Chapman Field • Corpus Christi, TX	5–0	**Blanchard, Cera (13-1)**	Aholelei, Primrose (13-7)	None	ESPN+	272	33–7	10–2
Apr 9	LSU*	6	Tiger Park • Baton Rouge, LA	5–7	Raelin Chaffin (W, 10-2)	**Blanchard, Cera (L, 13-2)**	None	SECN+	2,093	33–8	
Apr 12	Northwestern State		North Oak Park • Hammond, LA	5–4	**DuBois, Ellie (12-3)**	Seely, Kenzie (7-11)	None	ESPN+	245	34–8	11–2
Apr 12	Northwestern State		North Oak Park • Hammond, LA	5–1	**Blanchard, Cera (14-2)**	Darr, Maggie (5-12)	None	ESPN+	245	35–8	12–2
Apr 13	Northwestern State		North Oak Park • Hammond, LA	8–4	**Blanchard, Cera (15-2)**	Darr, Maggie (5-13)	None	ESPN+	174	36–8	13–2
Apr 19	at Nicholls		Swanner Field at Geo Surfaces Park • Thibodaux, LA	3–1	**Blanchard, Cera (16-2)**	Yoo, Molly (6-7)	None	ESPN+	202	37–8	14–2
Apr 19	at Nicholls		Swanner Field at Geo Surfaces Park • Thibodaux, LA	3–4	McNeill, Audrey (10-11)	**DuBois, Ellie (12-4)**	None	ESPN+	202	37–9	14–3
Apr 20	at Nicholls		Swanner Field at Geo Surfaces Park • Thibodaux, LA	5–7	McNeill, A. (11-11)	**Comeaux, Mary-Cathryn (MC) (3-3)**	Yoo, M. (1)		123	37–10	14–4
Apr 23	Alcorn State*		North Oak Park • Hammond, LA	7–0	**Comeaux, Mary-Cathryn (MC) (4-3)**	Kiri Parker (3-13)	None	ESPN+	150	38–10	
Apr 23	Alcorn State*		North Oak Park • Hammond, LA	16–1 (5 inn)	**Bennett, Chloe (4-1)**	Ta'Niyah Fletcher (1-8)	None	ESPN+	130	39–10	
Apr 26	Lamar		North Oak Park • Hammond, LA	9–1 (5 inn)	**Blanchard, Cera (17-2)**	Wardlaw, Emma (9-6)	None	ESPN+	205	40–10	15–4
Apr 26	Lamar		North Oak Park • Hammond, LA	8–0 (5 inn)	**DuBois, Ellie (13-4)**	Mitchell, Karyana (13-7)	None	ESPN+	205	41–10	16–4
Apr 27	Lamar		North Oak Park • Hammond, LA	10–0 (5 inn)	**Comeaux, Mary-Cathryn (MC) (5-3)**	Wardlaw, Emma (9-7)	None	ESPN+	186	42–10	17–4

May (0–3)
Date	Opponent	Rank	Site/stadium	Score	Win	Loss	Save	TV	Attendance	Overall record	SLC record
May 3	at McNeese		Joe Miller Field at Cowgirl Diamond • Lake Charles, LA	0–3	Sanders, Shaelyn (19-9)	**Brunson, Allison (3-1)**	None	ESPN+	1,041	42–11	17–5
May 3	at McNeese		Joe Miller Field at Cowgirl Diamond • Lake Charles, LA	3–5	Schexnayder, Ryann (7-2)	**DuBois, Ellie (13-5)**	Sanders, Shaelyn (3)	ESPN+		42–12	17–6
May 4	at McNeese		Joe Miller Field at Cowgirl Diamond • Lake Charles, LA	2–6	Schexnayder, Ryann (8-2)	**Brunson, Allison (3-2)**	None	ESPN+	912	42–13	17–7

Post-Season (5–2)

Southland Tournament (3–0)
Date	Opponent	(Seed)/Rank	Site/stadium	Score	Win	Loss	Save	TV	Attendance	Overall record	Tournament record
May 8	(3) Nicholls	(2)	North Oak Park • Hammond, LA	4–1	**Blanchard, Cera (18-2)**	Yoo, Molly (7-9)	None	ESPN+	456	43–13	1–0
May 9	(4) Incarnate Word	(2)	North Oak Park • Hammond, LA	6–1	**DuBois, Ellie(14-5)**	Larissa Jacquez(11-6)	None	ESPN+	467	44–13	2–0
May 10	(4) Incarnate Word	(2)	North Oak Park • Hammond, LA	8–7	**Larissa Jacquez(11-7)**	Comeaux, MC(6-3)	None	ESPN+	457	45–13	3–0

NCAA Tournament (2–2)
Date	Opponent	(Seed)/Rank	Site/stadium	Score	Win	Loss	Save	TV	Attendance	Overall record	Tournament record
May 17	vs. Clemson	23	Rhoads Stadium • Tuscaloosa, AL	6–2	**DuBois, Ellie (15-5)**	Cagle, V (8-7)	None	ACCN		46–13	1–0
May 18	at Alabama	(14)/19	Rhoads Stadium • Tuscaloosa, AL	3–6 (9 inn)	Kayla Beaver (17-8)	**Cera Blanchard (18-3)**	None	ESPN+		46–14	1–1
May 18	vs. Clemson	23	Rhoads Stadium • Tuscaloosa, AL	6–2	**DuBois, Ellie (16-5)**	Brooke McCubbin (10-3)	None	ESPN+	2,217	47–14	2–1
May 19	at Alabama	(14)/19	Rhoads Stadium • Tuscaloosa, AL	2–12 (5 inn)	Jocelyn Briski (9-5)	**DuBois, Ellie (16-6)**	None	ESPN2	2,278	47–15	2–2

Schedule source:*Rankings are based on the team's current ranking in the NFCA/USA Softball poll.

== Conference awards and honors ==
=== Post-season All-Southland Conference Teams ===
Southeastern led the way with eight all-conference selections after posting a league-best 42 wins during the 2024 regular season.

Player of the Year: Victoria Altamirano, UIW

Hitter of the Year: Ka'Lyn Watson, Southeastern

Pitcher of the Year: Shaelyn Sanders, McNeese

Freshman of the Year: Alexis Dibbley, McNeese

Newcomer of the Year: Shenita Tucker, Lamar

Coach of the Year: James Landreneau, McNeese

==== First Team ====
- Corine Poncho (MCNS, SO, 1st Base)
- Mariana Torres (MCNS, SR, 2nd Base)
- Chloe Magee (SELA, FR, Shortstop)
- Maddison Guillen (UIW, SR, 3rd Base)
- Bailey Krolczyk (SELA, SR, Catcher)
- Victoria Altamirano (UIW, SO, Utility)
- Audrey Greely (SELA, SR, Designated Player)
- Reagan Heflin (NICH, SO, Outfielder)
- Ka'Lyn Watson (SELA, SR, Outfielder)
- Alexis Dibbley (MCNS, FR, Outfielder)
- Cera Blanchard (SELA, SR, Pitcher)
- Shaelyn Sanders (MCNS, SR, Pitcher)

==== Second Team ====
- Lexi Johnson (SELA, SR, 1st Base)
- Ryleigh Mata (UIW, JR, 2nd Base)
- Baylee Lemons (UIW, JR, Shortstop)
- Rylie Bouvier (MCNS, JR, 3rd Base)
- Bella Perez (MCNS, FR, Catcher)
- Haylie Savage (HCU, JR, Utility)
- Crislyne Moreno (MCNS, JR, Designated Player)
- Jillian Guiterrez (UIW, SO, Outfield)
- Abby Andersen (NICH, SR, Outfield)
- Cam Goodman (SELA, SR, Outfield)
- Primrose Aholelei (TAMUCC, SR, Pitcher)
- Ellie DuBois (SELA, SR, Pitcher)

=== Weekly awards ===
Weekly honors
Honors	Player	Position	Date Awarded	Ref.
SLC Softball Hitter of the week	Bailey Krolczyk	C	February 12, 2024	
SLC Softball Pitcher of the week	Ellie DuBois	RHP	February 19, 2024	
SLC Softball Hitter of the week	Maddie Watson	IF	March 4, 2024	
SLC Softball Hitter of the week	Lexi Johnson	1B	March 18, 2024	
SLC Softball Hitter of the week	Bailey Krolczyk	C	April 1, 2024	
SLC Softball Hitter of the week	Audrey Greely	OF	April 8, 2024	
SLC Softball Hitter of the week	Maddie Watson	IF	April 29, 2024	

== See also ==
2024 Southeastern Louisiana Lions baseball team
