= Incarnate Word Cardinals softball =

Incarnate Word Cardinals
- 2024 Incarnate Word Cardinals softball team
- University: University of the Incarnate Word
- Head coach: Kimberly Dean (2nd season)
- Conference: Southland
- Location: San Antonio, Texas, US
- Home stadium: H-E-B Field (capacity: 250)
- Nickname: Cardinals
- Colors: Red, white, and black

Conference tournament championships
- Lone Star: 2012

Regular-season conference championships
- Heartland: 2006

The Incarnate Word Cardinals softball team represents the University of the Incarnate Word, located in San Antonio, TX. The Cardinals are a member of the Southland Conference and participate in NCAA Division I college softball. The team is currently led by head coach Kimberly Dean and plays home games at H-E-B Field.

During the 2013–14 season the Cardinals started the four-year transitional period from NCAA Division 2 to Division 1.

== History ==
The first season for the Incarnate Word Cardinals softball team was 1987. The team first competed in NAIA, NCAA Division II, and is currently in the NCAA Division I since 2014. The Cardinals have been members of four conferences over the life of the program, the Heart of Texas (HOTC) Conference as NAIA and NCAA Division II, the Heartland Conference (2000–2010), the Lone Star Conference (2010–2013) at NCAA Division II, and the Southland Conference (2014–present) as an NCAA Division I team. As of the conclusion of the abbreviated 2020 season, the team has an all-time record of 718–898–3 (.472). They participated in NCAA Division II postseason play three times, NAIA postseason play two times. The Cardinals won the Heartland Conference championship in 2006 and the Lone Star Conference tournament championship in 2012. Additionally, they won the Lone Star Conference regular season South Division championship in 2011.

== H-E-B Field ==
H-E-B Field
- Interactive map of H-E-B Field
- Former names: Cardinals Field
- Location: Adjacent to McDermott Convocation Center on the campus of University of the Incarnate Word in San Antonio, Texas
- Coordinates: 29°28′07.7″N 98°28′10.6″W
- Owner: University of the Incarnate Word
- Operator: University of the Incarnate Word
- Seating type: Bleacher seats
- Capacity: 250
- Surface: Turf
- Scoreboard: Electronic
- Field size: Left Field: 200 ft Center Field: 210 ft Right Field: 200 ft

Tenant
- Incarnate Word Cardinals softball (NCAA)

H-E-B Field is the home stadium for the Division I (NCAA) Incarnate Word Cardinals softball team. The stadium is located on the campus of the University of the Incarnate Word in San Antonio, Texas. Amenities include bleacher seating for 250 fans; field lighting; an electronic scoreboard; enclosed dugouts; concessions; and restrooms. AstroTurf RootZone Diamond OPS Series field turf, new backstops, netting, and other visual improvements were installed in 2018 as Phase I of improvements to both the baseball stadium and softball stadium. The softball stadium was renamed H-E-B Field from Cardinals Field at the same time. The combined cost of the Phase I renovations was $1.2 million.

Over the years, the stadium has been host of numerous tournaments including the annual UIW Alamo Invitational.
