= 2024 NCAA Division I softball season =

College softball in the United States

- Duration: February 8 – June 6, 2024
- Number of teams: 286
- Defending Champions: Oklahoma
- TV partner/s: ESPN & ESPN+

NCAA Tournament
- Duration: May 17 – June 6
- Most conference bids: SEC, 13 bids

Women's College World Series
- Duration: May 30 – June 6
- Champions: Oklahoma (8th title)
- Runners-up: Texas (7th WCWS Appearance)
- Winning Coach: Patty Gasso (8th title)
- WCWS MOP: Kelly Maxwell

Seasons
- ← 2023 2025 →

The 2024 NCAA Division I softball season, play of college softball in the United States organized by the National Collegiate Athletic Association (NCAA) at the Division I level, began in February 2024. The season progressed through the regular season, many conference tournaments and championship series, and concluded with the 2024 NCAA Division I softball tournament and 2024 Women's College World Series. The Women's College World Series, consisting of the eight remaining teams in the NCAA Tournament and held annually in Oklahoma City at Devon Park, ended in June 2024.

== Realignment ==
One school began a transition from NCAA Division II to Division I on July 1, 2023.

- Le Moyne joined the Northeast Conference (NEC).

A total of 15 softball-sponsoring schools changed conferences after the 2023 season.

- BYU, Houston, and UCF joined the Big 12 Conference.
- Campbell joined the Coastal Athletic Association.
- Charlotte, FAU, North Texas, UAB and UTSA joined the American Athletic Conference.
- Jacksonville State, Liberty, New Mexico State, and Sam Houston joined Conference USA (CUSA).
- Western Illinois joined the Ohio Valley Conference.

The 2024 season was the last for 16 Division I softball schools in their current conferences.

- Eight of the nine softball-sponsoring members of the Pac-12 Conference left for other conferences:
  - Arizona, Arizona State, and Utah joined the Big 12 Conference.
  - California and Stanford joined the Atlantic Coast Conference.
  - Oregon, UCLA, and Washington joined the Big Ten Conference.
- Kennesaw State left the Atlantic Sun Conference (ASUN) for CUSA.
- Merrimack and Sacred Heart left the Northeast Conference for the Metro Atlantic Athletic Conference.
- Oklahoma and Texas left the Big 12 for the Southeastern Conference.
- Oregon State, the last softball-sponsoring school remaining in the Pac-12, is housing most of its non-football sports, including softball, in the West Coast Conference for at least the 2025 and 2026 seasons.
- Stephen F. Austin (SFA) and UTRGV left the Western Athletic Conference for the Southland Conference (SLC). SFA rejoined the SLC after a three-season absence.

Two softball-sponsoring schools started transitions from D-II after the 2024 season:

- Mercyhurst left the Pennsylvania State Athletic Conference for the NEC.
- West Georgia left the Gulf South Conference for the ASUN.

In addition to these changes, the Indiana University and Purdue University systems split IUPUI into separate IU- and Purdue-affiliated institutions at the end of the 2023–24 academic year, a move similar to the two systems' dissolution of their joint Fort Wayne campus in 2018. The IUPUI athletic program was transferred to the new IU Indianapolis and rebranded as IU Indy, maintaining IUPUI's memberships in Division I and the Horizon League.

== Other headlines ==
- March 3 – Louisiana defeated Oklahoma 7–5 in 8 innings, ending the Sooners' Division I-record 71-game winning streak.

== Season outlook ==
USA Today/NFCA DI Coaches Poll
Ranking	Team
1	Oklahoma
2	Tennessee
3	Florida Stateт
4	Stanfordт
5	Clemson
6	Georgia
7	Washington
8	Texas
9	Oklahoma State
10	UCLA
11	Duke
12	Alabama
13	Utah
14	LSU
15	Oregon
16	Arkansas
17	Florida
18	Nebraska
19	Auburn
20	Northwestern
21	Louisiana
22	Baylor
23	South Carolina
24	San Diego State
25	Kentucky

ESPN.com/USA Softball Collegiate Poll
Ranking	Team
1	Oklahoma
2	Tennessee
3	Stanford
4	Florida State
5	Texas
6	Georgia
7	Clemson
8	UCLA
9	Duke
10	Washington
11	Oklahoma State
12	Arkansas
13	Oregon
14	Alabama
15	LSU
16	Utah
17	Nebraska
18	Florida
19	Baylor
20	Auburn
21	Louisiana
22	South Carolina
23	Virginia Tech
24	Texas A&M
25	Northwestern

D1Softball
Ranking	Team
1	Oklahoma
2	Stanford
3	Tennessee
4	Florida State
5	Texas
6	Georgia
7	Clemson
8	Duke
9	UCLA
10	Washington
11	Alabama
12	Oklahoma State
13	Nebraska
14	Oregonт
15	Utahт
16	Baylor
17	LSU
18	Arkansas
19	Auburn
20	Florida
21	Louisiana
22	South Carolina
23	San Diego State
24	Northwestern
25	Texas A&M

Softball America
Ranking	Team
1	Oklahoma
2	Tennessee
3	Florida State
4	Stanford
5	Clemson
6	Georgia
7	Texas
8	Arkansas
9	Duke
10	UCLA
11	Baylor
12	LSU
13	Utah
14	Oklahoma State
15	Nebraska
16	Oregon
17	South Carolina
18	Virginia Tech
19	Texas A&M
20	Auburn
21	Alabama
22	Washington
23	Louisiana
24	Florida
25	San Diego State

== Conference standings ==
2024 America East Conference softball standings
	Conf.				Overall
Team	W		L	PCT	W		L	PCT
UAlbany ‍†‍‡‍^{y}	14	–	6	.700	33	–	14	.702
Binghamton ‍†‍‍	14	–	6	.700	32	–	18	.640
Bryant ‍‍‍	14	–	7	.667	34	–	17	.667
UMBC ‍‍‍	10	–	11	.476	21	–	24	.467
UMass Lowell ‍‍‍	8	–	11	.421	17	–	29	.370
Maine ‍‍‍	1	–	20	.048	5	–	40	.111
† – Conference champion ‡ – Tournament champion y – Invited to the NCAA tournament As of May 18, 2024; Rankings from NFCA/USA Today

2024 American Athletic Conference softball standings
	Conf.				Overall
Team	W		L	PCT	W		L	PCT
Florida Atlantic ‍†‍‍^{y}	21	–	6	.778	41	–	16	.719
Charlotte ‍†‍‡‍^{y}	21	–	6	.778	39	–	18	.684
North Texas ‍‍‍	17	–	10	.630	32	–	24	.571
Wichita State ‍‍‍	16	–	11	.593	28	–	22	.560
Tulsa ‍‍‍	14	–	13	.519	30	–	23	.566
UAB ‍‍‍	14	–	13	.519	23	–	29	.442
East Carolina ‍‍‍	13	–	14	.481	38	–	19	.667
South Florida ‍‍‍	13	–	14	.481	34	–	22	.607
UTSA ‍‍‍	5	–	22	.185	15	–	42	.263
Memphis ‍‍‍	1	–	26	.037	6	–	44	.120
† – Conference champion ‡ – Tournament champion y – Invited to the NCAA tournament As of May 18, 2024; Rankings from NFCA/USA Today

2024 ASUN Conference softball standings
	Conf.						Overall
Team	W		L		T	PCT	W		L		T	PCT
Eastern Kentucky ‍†‍‍	21	–	3	–	0	.875	42	–	10	–	0	.808
North Florida ‍‍‍	17	–	7	–	0	.708	35	–	18	–	0	.660
Central Arkansas ‍‍‍	15	–	7	–	1	.674	26	–	27	–	1	.491
Florida Gulf Coast ‍‍‡‍^{y}	16	–	8	–	0	.667	37	–	20	–	0	.649
North Alabama ‍‍‍	15	–	9	–	0	.625	35	–	19	–	0	.648
Jacksonville ‍‍‍	14	–	10	–	0	.583	26	–	25	–	0	.510
Queens (NC)* ‍‍‍	12	–	12	–	0	.500	29	–	26	–	0	.527
Austin Peay ‍‍‍	8	–	16	–	0	.333	23	–	29	–	0	.442
Kennesaw State ‍‍‍	8	–	16	–	0	.333	16	–	37	–	0	.302
Stetson ‍‍‍	6	–	18	–	0	.250	15	–	37	–	0	.288
Bellarmine* ‍‍‍	5	–	17	–	1	.239	13	–	32	–	1	.293
Lipscomb ‍‍‍	5	–	19	–	0	.208	16	–	36	–	0	.308
† – Conference champion ‡ – Tournament champion y – Invited to the NCAA tournament * ineligible for the 2024 NCAA tournament due to transition from Division II; As of May 18, 2024; Rankings from NFCA/USA Today

2024 Atlantic 10 Conference softball standings
	Conf.						Overall
Team	W		L		T	PCT	W		L		T	PCT
Dayton ‍†‍‡‍^{y}	19	–	7	–	0	.731	33	–	21	–	0	.611
Loyola Chicago ‍‍‍	17	–	9	–	0	.654	30	–	22	–	0	.577
Saint Louis ‍‍‍	16	–	10	–	0	.615	31	–	22	–	0	.585
Fordham ‍‍‍	15	–	11	–	0	.577	25	–	29	–	1	.464
Saint Joseph's ‍‍‍	14	–	12	–	0	.538	22	–	30	–	0	.423
UMass ‍‍‍	14	–	12	–	0	.538	20	–	35	–	0	.364
George Washington ‍‍‍	11	–	14	–	0	.440	26	–	26	–	0	.500
George Mason ‍‍‍	11	–	15	–	0	.423	20	–	32	–	0	.385
Rhode Island ‍‍‍	10	–	16	–	0	.385	15	–	37	–	0	.288
St. Bonaventure ‍‍‍	3	–	23	–	0	.115	4	–	38	–	0	.095
† – Conference champion ‡ – Tournament champion y – Invited to the NCAA tournament As of May 18, 2024; Rankings from NFCA/USA Today

2024 Atlantic Coast Conference softball standings
	Conf.						Overall
Team	W		L		T	PCT	W		L		T	PCT
No. 7 Duke ‍†‍‡‍^{y}	20	–	4	–	0	.833	52	–	9	–	0	.852
No. 13 Florida State ‍‍‍^{y}	19	–	5	–	0	.792	46	–	16	–	0	.742
No. 17 Virginia Tech ‍‍‍^{y}	18	–	6	–	0	.750	40	–	13	–	1	.750
Clemson ‍‍‍^{y}	15	–	9	–	0	.625	35	–	19	–	0	.648
Virginia ‍‍‍^{y}	15	–	9	–	0	.625	34	–	20	–	0	.630
Georgia Tech ‍‍‍	12	–	12	–	0	.500	32	–	23	–	0	.582
North Carolina ‍‍‍	10	–	14	–	0	.417	30	–	20	–	0	.600
Boston College ‍‍‍	9	–	15	–	0	.375	30	–	24	–	0	.556
Syracuse ‍‍‍	9	–	15	–	0	.375	28	–	23	–	0	.549
Notre Dame ‍‍‍	9	–	15	–	0	.375	27	–	23	–	0	.540
Louisville ‍‍‍	8	–	16	–	0	.333	27	–	25	–	0	.519
NC State ‍‍‍	6	–	18	–	0	.250	30	–	23	–	0	.566
Pittsburgh ‍‍‍	6	–	18	–	0	.250	17	–	32	–	0	.347
† – Conference champion ‡ – Tournament champion y – Invited to the NCAA Tournament; As of June 11, 2024; Rankings from NFCA/USA Today

2024 Big 12 Conference softball standings
	Conf.						Overall
Team	W		L		T	PCT	W		L		T	PCT
No. 2 Texas ‍†‍‍^{y}	23	–	4	–	0	.852	55	–	10	–	0	.846
No. 1 Oklahoma ‍‍‡‍^{y}	22	–	5	–	0	.815	59	–	7	–	0	.894
No. 6 Oklahoma State ‍‍‍^{y}	21	–	6	–	0	.778	49	–	12	–	0	.803
Baylor ‍‍‍^{y}	14	–	13	–	0	.519	36	–	23	–	0	.610
UCF ‍‍‍^{y}	12	–	15	–	0	.444	31	–	25	–	0	.554
BYU ‍‍‍	11	–	16	–	0	.407	31	–	23	–	0	.574
Kansas ‍‍‍	11	–	16	–	0	.407	28	–	25	–	1	.528
Texas Tech ‍‍‍	8	–	16	–	0	.333	29	–	21	–	0	.580
Iowa State ‍‍‍	6	–	18	–	0	.250	20	–	31	–	0	.392
Houston ‍‍‍	4	–	23	–	0	.148	25	–	30	–	0	.455
† – Conference champion ‡ – Tournament champion y – Invited to the NCAA Tournament; As of June 11, 2024; Rankings from NFCA/USA Today

2024 Big East Conference softball standings
	Conf.						Overall
Team	W		L		T	PCT	W		L		T	PCT
Villanova ‍†‍‡‍^{y}	19	–	5	–	0	.792	33	–	24	–	0	.579
Creighton ‍‍‍	16	–	8	–	0	.667	36	–	21	–	0	.632
UConn ‍‍‍	16	–	8	–	0	.667	31	–	24	–	0	.564
Seton Hall ‍‍‍	14	–	10	–	0	.583	27	–	23	–	0	.540
St. John's ‍‍‍	13	–	11	–	0	.542	31	–	27	–	0	.534
Providence ‍‍‍	11	–	13	–	0	.458	22	–	23	–	1	.489
Butler ‍‍‍	11	–	13	–	0	.458	23	–	29	–	0	.442
Georgetown ‍‍‍	4	–	20	–	0	.167	14	–	33	–	0	.298
DePaul ‍‍‍	4	–	20	–	0	.167	9	–	38	–	0	.191
† – Conference champion ‡ – Tournament champion y – Invited to the NCAA Tournament; As of May 19, 2024; Rankings from NFCA/USA Today

2024 Big Sky Conference softball standings
	Conf.				Overall
Team	W		L	PCT	W		L	PCT
Northern Colorado ‍†‍‡‍^{y}	9	–	5	.643	27	–	26	.509
Sacramento State ‍‍‍	7	–	4	.636	28	–	20	.583
Idaho State ‍‍‍	7	–	4	.636	25	–	28	.472
Portland State ‍‍‍	8	–	6	.571	24	–	24	.500
Weber State ‍‍‍	8	–	7	.533	22	–	28	.440
Montana ‍‍‍	1	–	14	.067	17	–	33	.340
† – Conference champion ‡ – Tournament champion y – Invited to the NCAA tournament As of May 18, 2024; Rankings from NFCA/USA Today

2024 Big South Conference softball standings
	Conf.				Overall
Team	W		L	PCT	W		L	PCT
USC Upstate ‍†‍‍^{y}	13	–	5	.722	30	–	23	.566
Longwood ‍‍‍	11	–	7	.611	19	–	33	.365
Winthrop ‍‍‍	9	–	9	.500	26	–	29	.473
Charleston Southern ‍‍‍	9	–	9	.500	23	–	27	.460
Gardner-Webb ‍‍‍	9	–	9	.500	33	–	20	.623
Radford ‍‍‍	7	–	11	.389	24	–	23	.511
Presbyterian ‍‍‍	5	–	13	.278	15	–	36	.294
† – Conference champion ‡ – Tournament champion y – Invited to the NCAA tournament As of May 18, 2024; Rankings from NFCA/USA Today

2024 Big Ten Conference softball standings
	Conf.				Overall
Team	W		L	PCT	W		L	PCT
No. 25 Northwestern ‍†‍‍^{y}	19	–	3	.864	35	–	13	.729
Michigan ‍‍‡‍^{y}	18	–	5	.783	43	–	18	.705
Rutgers ‍‍‍	14	–	9	.609	33	–	22	.600
Nebraska ‍‍‍	12	–	9	.571	30	–	23	.566
Minnesota ‍‍‍	13	–	10	.565	28	–	25	.528
Indiana ‍‍‍^{y}	12	–	11	.522	40	–	20	.667
Penn State ‍‍‍^{y}	12	–	11	.522	35	–	20	.636
Ohio State ‍‍‍	12	–	11	.522	31	–	20	.608
Purdue ‍‍‍	11	–	12	.478	25	–	27	.481
Maryland ‍‍‍	8	–	15	.348	24	–	30	.444
Wisconsin ‍‍‍	8	–	15	.348	21	–	31	.404
Illinois ‍‍‍	7	–	15	.318	21	–	31	.404
Michigan State ‍‍‍	7	–	16	.304	21	–	30	.412
Iowa ‍‍‍	6	–	17	.261	18	–	28	.391
† – Conference champion ‡ – Tournament champion y – Invited to the NCAA Tournament; As of May 19, 2024; Rankings from NFCA/USA Today

2024 Big West Conference softball standings
	Conf.				Overall
Team	W		L	PCT	W		L	PCT
Cal State Fullerton ‍†‍‍^{y}	22	–	5	.815	39	–	19	.672
Long Beach State ‍‍‍	20	–	7	.741	25	–	29	.463
Cal Poly ‍‍‍	18	–	8	.692	28	–	17	.622
Hawaii ‍‍‍	13	–	12	.520	20	–	26	.435
UC Santa Barbara ‍‍‍	14	–	13	.519	20	–	28	.417
UC Riverside ‍‍‍	13	–	14	.481	19	–	28	.404
UC Davis ‍‍‍	12	–	15	.444	21	–	29	.420
UC San Diego* ‍‍‍	9	–	17	.346	16	–	35	.314
Cal State Northridge ‍‍‍	9	–	18	.333	25	–	26	.490
Cal State Bakersfield ‍‍‍	3	–	24	.111	5	–	46	.098
† – Conference champion y – Invited to the NCAA tournament * ineligible for the 2024 NCAA tournament due to transition from Division II; As of May 19, 2024; Rankings from NFCA/USA Today

2024 Coastal Athletic Association softball standings
	Conf.						Overall
Team	W		L		T	PCT	W		L		T	PCT
Campbell ‍†‍‍	22	–	5	–	0	.815	37	–	21	–	1	.636
Delaware ‍‍‍	21	–	6	–	0	.778	39	–	14	–	0	.736
Stony Brook ‍‍‍	19	–	8	–	0	.704	35	–	17	–	0	.673
UNC Wilmington ‍‍‡‍^{y}	18	–	9	–	0	.667	33	–	23	–	0	.589
Elon ‍‍‍	17	–	10	–	0	.630	23	–	29	–	0	.442
Hofstra ‍‍‍	17	–	10	–	0	.630	23	–	26	–	0	.469
Monmouth ‍‍‍	10	–	16	–	0	.385	18	–	33	–	0	.353
Drexel ‍‍‍	10	–	16	–	0	.385	15	–	30	–	0	.333
Towson ‍‍‍	10	–	17	–	0	.370	22	–	32	–	0	.407
Hampton ‍‍‍	7	–	20	–	0	.259	17	–	35	–	0	.327
North Carolina A&T ‍‍‍	6	–	21	–	0	.222	12	–	36	–	0	.250
Charleston ‍‍‍	4	–	23	–	0	.148	10	–	39	–	0	.204
† – Conference champion ‡ – Tournament champion y – Invited to the NCAA tournament As of May 18, 2024; Rankings from NFCA/USA Today

2024 Conference USA softball standings
	Conf.						Overall
Team	W		L		T	PCT	W		L		T	PCT
Liberty ‍†‍‡‍^{y}	19	–	5	–	0	.792	38	–	25	–	0	.603
Western Kentucky ‍‍‍	16	–	8	–	0	.667	33	–	20	–	1	.620
Louisiana Tech ‍‍‍	13	–	11	–	0	.542	32	–	22	–	0	.593
New Mexico State ‍‍‍	13	–	11	–	0	.542	30	–	25	–	0	.545
Jacksonville State ‍‍‍	12	–	11	–	0	.522	23	–	30	–	0	.434
UTEP ‍‍‍	11	–	13	–	0	.458	26	–	21	–	0	.553
Sam Houston ‍‍‍	8	–	15	–	0	.348	20	–	30	–	0	.400
FIU ‍‍‍	8	–	16	–	0	.333	21	–	29	–	0	.420
Middle Tennessee ‍‍‍	7	–	17	–	0	.292	21	–	31	–	0	.404
† – Conference champion ‡ – Tournament champion y – Invited to the NCAA tournament As of May 19, 2024; Rankings from NFCA/USA Today

2024 Horizon League softball standings
	Conf.				Overall
Team	W		L	PCT	W		L	PCT
Youngstown State ‍†‍‍	20	–	4	.833	36	–	17	.679
Oakland ‍‍‍	17	–	6	.739	25	–	19	.568
Cleveland State ‍‍‡‍^{y}	14	–	10	.583	22	–	26	.458
Northern Kentucky ‍‍‍	14	–	10	.583	27	–	22	.551
Robert Morris ‍‍‍	13	–	10	.565	20	–	24	.455
IUPUI ‍‍‍	9	–	14	.391	13	–	37	.260
Purdue Fort Wayne ‍‍‍	9	–	15	.375	14	–	33	.298
Detroit Mercy ‍‍‍	5	–	18	.217	6	–	38	.136
Green Bay ‍‍‍	5	–	19	.208	9	–	38	.191
† – Conference champion ‡ – Tournament champion y – Invited to the NCAA tournament As of May 18, 2024; Rankings from NFCA/USA Today

2024 Ivy League softball standings
	Conf.				Overall
Team	W		L	PCT	W		L	PCT
Princeton ‍†‍‡‍^{y}	14	–	7	.667	30	–	17	.638
Harvard ‍†‍‍	14	–	7	.667	27	–	17	.614
Yale ‍†‍‍	14	–	7	.667	20	–	26	.435
Dartmouth ‍‍‍	13	–	7	.650	18	–	17	.514
Brown ‍‍‍	10	–	11	.476	18	–	24	.429
Columbia ‍‍‍	9	–	11	.450	16	–	24	.400
Cornell ‍‍‍	5	–	16	.238	8	–	29	.216
Penn ‍‍‍	4	–	17	.190	11	–	29	.275
† – Conference champion ‡ – Tournament champion y – Invited to the NCAA tournament As of May 18, 2024; Rankings from NFCA/USA Today

2024 Metro Atlantic Athletic Conference softball standings
	Conf.				Overall
Team	W		L	PCT	W		L	PCT
Marist ‍†‍‍	17	–	6	.739	36	–	19	.655
Niagara ‍‍‍	16	–	7	.696	29	–	21	.580
Rider ‍‍‍	16	–	7	.696	25	–	26	.490
Canisius ‍‍‍	14	–	9	.609	23	–	22	.511
Iona ‍‍‍	14	–	10	.583	17	–	30	.362
Siena ‍‍‡‍^{y}	12	–	11	.522	33	–	22	.600
Fairfield ‍‍‍	10	–	14	.417	14	–	33	.298
Manhattan ‍‍‍	10	–	14	.417	13	–	37	.260
Quinnipiac ‍‍‍	8	–	16	.333	19	–	26	.422
Mount St. Mary's ‍‍‍	6	–	17	.261	14	–	32	.304
Saint Peter's ‍‍‍	6	–	18	.250	16	–	34	.320
† – Conference champion ‡ – Tournament champion y – Invited to the NCAA tournament As of May 18, 2024; Rankings from NFCA/USA Today

2024 Mid-American Conference softball standings
	Conf.				Overall
Team	W		L	PCT	W		L	PCT
Miami (OH) ‍†‍‡‍^{y}	26	–	1	.963	49	–	9	.845
Ohio ‍‍‍	18	–	8	.692	31	–	24	.564
Western Michigan ‍‍‍	16	–	8	.667	27	–	22	.551
Toledo ‍‍‍	15	–	10	.600	26	–	23	.531
Central Michigan ‍‍‍	13	–	11	.542	17	–	33	.340
Ball State ‍‍‍	12	–	13	.480	29	–	29	.500
Akron ‍‍‍	11	–	14	.440	23	–	29	.442
Kent State ‍‍‍	11	–	15	.423	26	–	23	.531
Northern Illinois ‍‍‍	9	–	19	.321	18	–	34	.346
Buffalo ‍‍‍	7	–	18	.280	16	–	32	.333
Bowling Green ‍‍‍	3	–	23	.115	6	–	38	.136
† – Conference champion ‡ – Tournament champion y – Invited to the NCAA tournament As of May 18, 2024; Rankings from NFCA/USA Today

2024 Mid-Eastern Athletic Conference softball standings
	Conf.				Overall
Team	W		L	PCT	W		L	PCT
Morgan State ‍†‍‡‍^{y}	18	–	3	.857	35	–	20	.636
Howard ‍‍‍	16	–	5	.762	32	–	13	.711
Coppin State ‍‍‍	15	–	6	.714	23	–	22	.511
North Carolina Central ‍‍‍	14	–	7	.667	20	–	34	.370
South Carolina State ‍‍‍	8	–	13	.381	12	–	30	.286
Delaware State ‍‍‍	5	–	16	.238	14	–	28	.333
Maryland Eastern Shore ‍‍‍	5	–	16	.238	11	–	35	.239
Norfolk State ‍‍‍	3	–	18	.143	4	–	42	.087
† – Conference champion ‡ – Tournament champion y – Invited to the NCAA tournament As of May 18, 2024; Rankings from NFCA/USA Today

2024 Missouri Valley Conference softball standings
	Conf.				Overall
Team	W		L	PCT	W		L	PCT
Southern Illinois ‍†‍‡‍^{y}	23	–	4	.852	44	–	11	.800
Northern Iowa ‍‍‍	18	–	6	.750	33	–	17	.660
Belmont ‍‍‍	16	–	11	.593	30	–	20	.600
Illinois State ‍‍‍	16	–	11	.593	23	–	31	.426
Bradley ‍‍‍	15	–	12	.556	29	–	27	.518
Missouri State ‍‍‍	13	–	14	.481	19	–	32	.373
Drake ‍‍‍	11	–	13	.458	23	–	26	.469
UIC ‍‍‍	12	–	15	.444	19	–	35	.352
Murray State ‍‍‍	10	–	16	.385	24	–	30	.444
Evansville ‍‍‍	10	–	17	.370	16	–	36	.308
Indiana State ‍‍‍	8	–	16	.333	20	–	30	.400
Valparaiso ‍‍‍	3	–	20	.130	9	–	40	.184
† – Conference champion ‡ – Tournament champion y – Invited to the NCAA tournament As of May 19, 2024; Rankings from NFCA/USA Today

2024 Mountain West Conference softball standings
	Conf.				Overall
Team	W		L	PCT	W		L	PCT
San Diego State ‍†‍‡‍^{y}	15	–	7	.682	31	–	19	.620
Nevada ‍‍‍	14	–	8	.636	39	–	18	.684
UNLV ‍‍‍	14	–	8	.636	31	–	19	.620
Fresno State ‍‍‍	13	–	9	.591	33	–	19	.635
Boise State ‍‍‍	13	–	9	.591	36	–	23	.610
Colorado State ‍‍‍	9	–	12	.429	26	–	21	.553
New Mexico ‍‍‍	8	–	14	.364	16	–	38	.296
San Jose State ‍‍‍	7	–	14	.333	18	–	27	.400
Utah State ‍‍‍	5	–	17	.227	22	–	28	.440
† – Conference champion ‡ – Tournament champion y – Invited to the NCAA tournament As of May 18, 2024; Rankings from NFCA/USA Today

2024 Northeast Conference softball standings
	Conf.				Overall
Team	W		L	PCT	W		L	PCT
Saint Francis (PA) ‍†‍‡‍^{y}	24	–	0	1.000	41	–	14	.745
LIU ‍‍‍	17	–	7	.708	32	–	21	.604
Sacred Heart ‍‍‍	16	–	8	.667	27	–	28	.491
Central Connecticut ‍‍‍	14	–	10	.583	28	–	19	.596
Merrimack* ‍‍‍	12	–	12	.500	19	–	34	.358
Fairleigh Dickinson ‍‍‍	11	–	13	.458	22	–	25	.468
Le Moyne* ‍‍‍	8	–	16	.333	17	–	37	.315
Stonehill ‍‍‍	3	–	21	.125	14	–	37	.275
Wagner ‍‍‍	3	–	21	.125	8	–	30	.211
† – Conference champion ‡ – Tournament champion y – Invited to the NCAA tournament * ineligible for the 2024 NCAA tournament due to transition from Division II; As of May 18, 2024; Rankings from NFCA/USA Today

2024 Ohio Valley Conference softball standings
	Conf.				Overall
Team	W		L	PCT	W		L	PCT
Eastern Illinois ‍†‍‍	22	–	5	.815	40	–	17	.702
Southeast Missouri State ‍‍‡‍^{y}	19	–	8	.704	28	–	26	.519
Tennessee State ‍‍‍	15	–	10	.600	26	–	25	.510
Southern Indiana* ‍‍‍	16	–	11	.593	25	–	22	.532
UT Martin ‍‍‍	15	–	12	.556	30	–	22	.577
Lindenwood* ‍‍‍	13	–	14	.481	25	–	25	.500
Tennessee Tech ‍‍‍	12	–	13	.480	23	–	24	.489
SIU Edwardsville ‍‍‍	10	–	17	.370	19	–	35	.352
Morehead State ‍‍‍	6	–	21	.222	12	–	28	.300
Western Illinois ‍‍‍	5	–	22	.185	16	–	34	.320
† – Conference champion ‡ – Tournament champion y – Invited to the NCAA tournament * ineligible for the 2024 NCAA tournament due to transition from Division II; As of May 18, 2024; Rankings from NFCA/USA Today

2024 Pac-12 Conference softball standings
	Conf.						Overall
Team	W		L		T	PCT	W		L		T	PCT
No. 6 UCLA ‍†‍‡‍^{y}	17	–	4	–	0	.810	43	–	12	–	0	.782
No. 7 Stanford ‍‍‍^{y}	17	–	7	–	0	.708	50	–	16	–	0	.758
No. 12 Washington ‍‍‍^{y}	13	–	10	–	0	.565	32	–	15	–	0	.681
No. 24 Oregon ‍‍‍^{y}	13	–	10	–	0	.565	30	–	21	–	0	.588
No. 18 Arizona ‍‍‍^{y}	13	–	11	–	0	.542	37	–	18	–	1	.670
Utah ‍‍‍^{y}	10	–	13	–	0	.435	35	–	22	–	0	.614
No. 19 California ‍‍‍^{y}	9	–	13	–	0	.409	37	–	19	–	0	.661
Oregon State ‍‍‍	9	–	15	–	0	.375	21	–	29	–	0	.420
Arizona State ‍‍‍	3	–	21	–	0	.125	20	–	31	–	0	.392
† – Conference champion ‡ – Tournament champion y – Invited to the NCAA Tournament; As of June 2, 2024; Rankings from NFCA/USA Today

2024 Patriot League softball standings
	Conf.						Overall
Team	W		L		T	PCT	W		L		T	PCT
No. 22 Boston University ‍†‍‡‍^{y}	18	–	0	–	0	1.000	53	–	6	–	1	.892
Lehigh ‍‍‍	14	–	4	–	0	.778	32	–	20	–	0	.615
Bucknell ‍‍‍	9	–	9	–	0	.500	19	–	27	–	0	.413
Army ‍‍‍	9	–	9	–	0	.500	15	–	36	–	0	.294
Colgate ‍‍‍	8	–	10	–	0	.444	21	–	27	–	0	.438
Holy Cross ‍‍‍	4	–	14	–	0	.222	14	–	35	–	0	.286
Lafayette ‍‍‍	1	–	17	–	0	.056	5	–	37	–	0	.119
† – Conference champion ‡ – Tournament champion y – Invited to the NCAA tournament As of May 18, 2024; Rankings from NFCA/USA Today

2024 Southeastern Conference softball standings
	Conf.						Overall
Team	W		L		T	PCT	W		L		T	PCT
No. 3 Tennessee ‍†‍‍	19	–	5	–	0	.792	44	–	12	–	0	.786
No. 7 Florida ‍‍‡‍^{y}	17	–	7	–	0	.708	53	–	14	–	0	.791
No. 9 Texas A&M ‍‍‍^{y}	15	–	9	–	0	.625	44	–	15	–	0	.746
No. 16 Arkansas ‍‍‍^{y}	14	–	10	–	0	.583	37	–	18	–	0	.673
No. 10 Missouri ‍‍‍^{y}	13	–	11	–	0	.542	48	–	18	–	0	.727
No. 11 LSU ‍‍‍^{y}	12	–	12	–	0	.500	44	–	17	–	0	.721
No. 14 Georgia ‍‍‍^{y}	12	–	12	–	0	.500	43	–	19	–	0	.694
No. 18 Mississippi State ‍‍‍^{y}	12	–	12	–	0	.500	34	–	20	–	0	.630
No. 19 Alabama ‍‍‍^{y}	10	–	14	–	0	.417	38	–	20	–	0	.655
Auburn ‍‍‍^{y}	9	–	15	–	0	.375	29	–	21	–	1	.578
South Carolina ‍‍‍^{y}	8	–	16	–	0	.333	36	–	24	–	0	.600
Kentucky ‍‍‍^{y}	8	–	16	–	0	.333	31	–	24	–	0	.564
Ole Miss ‍‍‍^{y}	7	–	17	–	0	.292	31	–	27	–	0	.534
† – Conference champion ‡ – Tournament champion y – Invited to the NCAA tournament As of June 2, 2024; Rankings from NFCA/USA Today

2024 Southern Conference softball standings
	Conf.				Overall
Team	W		L	PCT	W		L	PCT
Chattanooga ‍†‍‡‍^{y}	16	–	5	.762	42	–	16	.724
UNC Greensboro ‍‍‍	13	–	8	.619	33	–	26	.559
Samford ‍‍‍	12	–	9	.571	24	–	32	.429
Wofford ‍‍‍	11	–	10	.524	23	–	24	.489
Mercer ‍‍‍	11	–	10	.524	23	–	30	.434
Furman ‍‍‍	9	–	12	.429	24	–	30	.444
Western Carolina ‍‍‍	7	–	14	.333	18	–	35	.340
East Tennessee State ‍‍‍	5	–	16	.238	11	–	39	.220
† – Conference champion ‡ – Tournament champion y – Invited to the NCAA tournament As of May 18, 2024; Rankings from NFCA/USA Today

2024 Southland Conference softball standings
	Conf.				Overall
Team	W		L	PCT	W		L	PCT
McNeese ‍†‍‍	22	–	2	.917	40	–	20	.667
Southeastern Louisiana ‍‍‡‍^{y}	17	–	7	.708	47	–	15	.758
Nicholls ‍‍‍	16	–	8	.667	31	–	26	.544
Incarnate Word ‍‍‍	14	–	9	.609	34	–	17	.667
Lamar ‍‍‍	12	–	12	.500	26	–	25	.510
Texas A&M–Corpus Christi ‍‍‍	9	–	15	.375	21	–	22	.488
Houston Christian ‍‍‍	9	–	15	.375	23	–	27	.460
Northwestern State ‍‍‍	5	–	18	.217	19	–	31	.380
Texas A&M–Commerce* ‍‍‍	2	–	22	.083	9	–	45	.167
† – Conference champion ‡ – Tournament champion y – Invited to the NCAA tournament * Ineligible for the 2024 NCAA tournament due to transition from Division II; As of May 19, 2024; Rankings from NFCA/USA Today

2024 Southwestern Athletic Conference softball standings
	Conf.				Overall
Team	W		L	PCT	W		L	PCT
East
Florida A&M ^{x}‍‍‍	19	–	5	.792	27	–	16	.628
Jackson State ‍‍‡‍^{y}	16	–	8	.667	33	–	19	.635
Bethune-Cookman ‍‍‍	16	–	8	.667	20	–	32	.385
Alabama State ‍‍‍	15	–	9	.625	28	–	29	.491
Alabama A&M ‍‍‍	5	–	19	.208	9	–	27	.250
Mississippi Valley State ‍‍‍	1	–	23	.042	3	–	34	.081
West
Prairie View A&M ^{x}‍‍‍	23	–	1	.958	31	–	18	.633
Texas Southern ‍‍‍	13	–	8	.619	21	–	17	.553
Southern ‍‍‍	12	–	12	.500	16	–	25	.390
Arkansas-Pine Bluff ‍‍‍	8	–	14	.364	19	–	29	.396
Grambling State ‍‍‍	8	–	16	.333	17	–	30	.362
Alcorn State ‍‍‍	5	–	19	.208	10	–	34	.227
x – Division champion ‡ – Tournament champion y – Invited to the NCAA tournament As of May 18, 2024; Rankings from NFCA/USA Today

2024 Summit League softball standings
	Conf.				Overall
Team	W		L	PCT	W		L	PCT
South Dakota State ‍†‍‍	14	–	2	.875	33	–	22	.600
Omaha ‍‍‡‍^{y}	14	–	4	.778	43	–	15	.741
St. Thomas* ‍‍‍	8	–	9	.471	16	–	34	.320
Kansas City ‍‍‍	8	–	10	.444	23	–	32	.418
South Dakota ‍‍‍	7	–	10	.412	23	–	30	.434
North Dakota ‍‍‍	6	–	12	.333	14	–	42	.250
North Dakota State ‍‍‍	4	–	14	.222	17	–	37	.315
† – Conference champion ‡ – Tournament champion y – Invited to the NCAA tournament * Ineligible for the 2024 NCAA tournament due to transition from Division III; As of May 19, 2024; Rankings from NFCA/USA Today

2024 Sun Belt Conference softball standings
	Conf.						Overall
Team	W		L		T	PCT	W		L		T	PCT
No. 21 Louisiana ‍†‍‍^{y}	22	–	2	–	0	.917	45	–	19	–	0	.703
Texas State ‍‍‡‍^{y}	18	–	6	–	0	.750	47	–	15	–	0	.758
South Alabama ‍‍‍^{y}	16	–	8	–	0	.667	34	–	20	–	1	.627
Coastal Carolina ‍‍‍	14	–	10	–	0	.583	34	–	21	–	0	.618
Troy ‍‍‍	13	–	11	–	0	.542	34	–	22	–	0	.607
Georgia Southern ‍‍‍	12	–	12	–	0	.500	30	–	21	–	0	.588
James Madison ‍‍‍	12	–	12	–	0	.500	31	–	22	–	0	.585
Louisiana-Monroe ‍‍‍	12	–	12	–	0	.500	31	–	24	–	0	.564
Marshall ‍‍‍	10	–	14	–	0	.417	25	–	28	–	0	.472
Southern Miss ‍‍‍	10	–	14	–	0	.417	22	–	29	–	0	.431
Appalachian State ‍‍‍	4	–	20	–	0	.167	21	–	30	–	0	.412
Georgia State ‍‍‍	1	–	23	–	0	.042	11	–	42	–	0	.208
† – Conference champion ‡ – Tournament champion y – Invited to the NCAA tournament As of May 19, 2024; Rankings from NFCA/USA Today

2024 Western Athletic Conference softball standings
	Conf.				Overall
Team	W		L	PCT	W		L	PCT
Grand Canyon ‍†‍‡‍^{y}	23	–	3	.885	50	–	13	.794
California Baptist ‍‍‍	17	–	7	.708	33	–	25	.569
Utah Valley ‍‍‍	15	–	10	.600	25	–	28	.472
Seattle ‍‍‍	14	–	12	.538	23	–	32	.418
Utah Tech ‍‍‍	12	–	13	.480	19	–	31	.380
UT Arlington ‍‍‍	10	–	13	.435	23	–	34	.404
Southern Utah ‍‍‍	9	–	16	.360	21	–	28	.429
Stephen F. Austin ‍‍‍	8	–	16	.333	16	–	39	.291
Tarleton State ‍‍‍	8	–	16	.333	22	–	32	.407
Abilene Christian ‍‍‍	8	–	18	.308	16	–	32	.333
† – Conference champion ‡ – Tournament champion y – Invited to the NCAA tournament As of May 19, 2024; Rankings from NFCA/USA Today

2024 West Coast Conference softball standings
	Conf.				Overall
Team	W		L	PCT	W		L	PCT
Saint Mary's ‍†‍‍^{y}	10	–	6	.625	30	–	24	.556
Loyola Marymount ‍‍‍	9	–	7	.563	28	–	25	.528
Santa Clara ‍‍‍	9	–	7	.563	30	–	23	.566
Pacific ‍‍‍	6	–	10	.375	17	–	36	.321
San Diego ‍‍‍	4	–	8	.333	18	–	38	.321
† – Conference champion y – Invited to the NCAA tournament As of May 18, 2024; Rankings from NFCA/USA Today

=== Conference winners and tournaments ===
Source: Of the 32 Division I athletic conferences that sponsor softball, 30 end their regular seasons with a single-elimination tournament or a double elimination tournament. The teams in each conference that win their regular season title are given the number one seed in each tournament. Two conferences, the Big West and West Coast Conference, do not hold a conference tournament. Conference tournament winners plus the Big West and West Coast Conference regular-season champions receive automatic invitations to the 2024 NCAA Division I softball tournament.

Conference	Regular Season Winner	Conference Player of the Year	Conference Pitcher of the Year	Conference Coach of the Year	Conference Tournament	Tournament Venue • City	Tournament Winner
America East Conference	Albany (Note: Top seed in conference tournament.); Binghamton	Allison L’Amoreaux; Binghamton	Wendi Hammond; Albany	Jess Bump; Binghamton / Bianka Bell; Bryant	2024 America East Conference softball tournament	Mike Kessock Field • Orono, ME	Albany
American Athletic Conference	Charlotte; Florida Atlantic	CC Wong; Wichita State	Georgeanna Barefoot; Charlotte	Jordan Clark; Florida Atlantic	2024 American Athletic Conference softball tournament	Wilkins Stadium • Wichita, KS	Charlotte
Atlantic 10 Conference	Dayton	Sydney Barnett; Loyola Chicago	Peyton Pepkowski; Loyola Chicago	Cara Clark; Dayton	2024 Atlantic 10 Conference softball tournament	Bahoshy Softball Complex • Bronx, NY	Dayton
Atlantic Coast Conference	Duke	Claire Davidson; Duke	Jala Wright; Duke	Marissa Young; Duke	2024 Atlantic Coast Conference softball tournament	Duke Softball Stadium • Durham, NC	Duke
Atlantic Sun Conference	Eastern Kentucky	Jeanay Riley; Eastern Kentucky	Maddi Rutan; Eastern Kentucky	Jane Worthington; Eastern Kentucky	2024 Atlantic Sun Conference softball tournament	Choccolocco Park • Oxford, AL	Florida Gulf Coast
Big 12 Conference	Texas	Reese Atwood; Texas	Lexi Kilfoyl; Oklahoma State	Mike White; Texas	2024 Big 12 Conference softball tournament	USA Softball Hall of Fame Stadium • Oklahoma City, OK	Oklahoma
Big East Conference	Villanova	Lexi Hastings; UConn	Natalia Puchino; Creighton	Bridget Orchard Villanova & Krista Wood Creighton	2024 Big East Conference softball tournament	Glay Field • Providence, RI	Villanova
Big Sky Conference	Northern Colorado	Amailee Morales Northern Colorado & Lewa Day Sacramento State	Erin Caviness; Northern Colorado	Dedeann Pendleton-Helm; Northern Colorado	2024 Big Sky Conference softball tournament	Miller Ranch Stadium • Pocatello, ID	Northern Colorado
Big South Conference	USC Upstate	Lexie Roberts; Radford	Nealy Lamb; Charleston Southern	Chris Hawkins; USC Upstate	2024 Big South Conference softball tournament	Terry Field • Rock Hill, SC	USC Upstate
Big Ten Conference	Northwestern	Jess Oakland; Minnesota	Ashley Miller; Northwestern	Kate Drohan; Northwestern	2024 Big Ten softball tournament	Bob Pearl Softball Field • Iowa City, IA	Michigan
Big West Conference	Cal State Fullerton	Jessica Clements, Cal Poly	Haley Rainey, Cal State Fullerton	Jenny Condon, Cal Poly	No Tournament, regular season champion earns auto bid		
Colonial Athletic Association	Campbell	Alyssa Henault; Campbell	Isabella Smith; Campbell	Trena Prater; Campbell	2024 Colonial Athletic Association softball tournament	Boseman Field • Wilmington, NC	UNC Wilmington
Conference USA	Liberty	Desirae Spearman; New Mexico State	Katie Gardner; Western Kentucky	Josh Taylor; Louisiana Tech	2024 Conference USA softball tournament	NMSU Softball Complex • Las Cruces, NM	Liberty
Horizon League	Youngstown State	Elyssa Imler; Youngstown State	Sydney Campbell; Oakland	Brian Campbell; Youngstown State	2024 Horizon League softball tournament	McCune Park • Youngstown, OH	Cleveland State
Ivy League	Harvard; Princeton; Yale	Sophie Sun; Harvard	Jensin Hall; Dartmouth	Lisa Van Ackeren; Princeton	2024 Ivy League Softball Championship Series	Site of Number 1 seed.	Princeton
Metro Atlantic Athletic Conference	Marist	Miah McDonald; Marist	Kiley Myers; Marist & Maddie Hickingbottom; Niagara	Joe Ausanio; Marist	2024 Metro Atlantic Athletic Conference softball tournament	Regular season champion home stadium	Siena
Mid-American Conference	Miami (OH)	Karli Spaid; Miami (OH)	Rissa Bajusz; Western Michigan	Kirin Kumar; Miami (OH)	2024 Mid-American Conference softball tournament	Firestone Stadium • Akron, OH	Miami (OH)
Mid-Eastern Athletic Conference	Morgan State	Victoria Fletcher; Morgan State	Vanessa Carrizosa; Chicago State	Mercedes Hargett Chicago State & Larry Hineline Morgan State	2024 Mid-Eastern Athletic Conference softball tournament	NSU Softball Field • Norfolk, VA	Morgan State
Missouri Valley Conference	Southern Illinois	Jackie Lis; Southern Illinois	Maddia Groff; Southern Illinois	Jen Sewell, Mary Jo Firnbach, Katie Griffith; Southern Illinois	2024 Missouri Valley Conference softball tournament	Marian Kneer Softball Stadium • Normal, IL	Southern Illinois
Mountain West Conference	San Diego State	Gabby Herrera Nevada & Mac Barbara San Diego State	Taylor Gilmore; Fresno State	Stacey Nuveman Deniz; San Diego State	2024 Mountain West Conference softball tournament	Dona Larsen Park • Boise, ID	San Diego State
Northeast Conference	Saint Francis (PA)	Paige Stringer; CCSU	Grace Vesco; Saint Francis	Beth Krysiak, Mel Savala, Ry Godde; Saint Francis (PA)	2024 Northeast Conference softball tournament	Red Flash Field • Loretto, PA	Saint Francis (PA)
Ohio Valley Conference	Eastern Illinois	Kendall Grover Eastern Illinois & Paige Rocha SIUE	Josie Newman; Southern Indiana	Tara Archibald; Eastern Illinois	2024 Ohio Valley Conference softball tournament	Louisville Slugger Sports Complex • Peoria, IL	Southeast Missouri State
Pac–12 Conference	UCLA	Maya Brady; UCLA	NiJaree Canady; Stanford	Kelly Inouye-Perez; UCLA	2024 Pac–12 Conference softball tournament	Boyd & Jill Smith Family Stadium • Palo Alto, CA	UCLA
Patriot League	Boston University	Lauren Keleher; Boston University	Kasey Ricard; Boston University	Ashley Waters; Boston University	2024 Patriot League softball tournament	Campus sites	Boston University
Southeastern Conference	Tennessee	Jocelyn Erickson; Florida	Karlyn Pickens; Tennessee	Karen Weekly; Tennessee	2024 Southeastern Conference softball tournament	Jane B. Moore Field • Auburn, AL	Florida
Southern Conference	Chattanooga	Brooklynn Maxwell; UNCG	Peja Goold; Chattanooga	Chelsea Butler; Wofford	2024 Southern Conference softball tournament	UNCG Softball Stadium • Greensboro, NC	Chattanooga
Southland Conference	McNeese	Victoria Altamirano; Incarnate Word	Shaelyn Sanders; McNeese	James Landreneau; McNeese	2024 Southland Conference softball tournament	North Oak Park • Hammond, LA	Southeastern Louisiana
Southwestern Athletic Conference	East - Florida A&M; West - Prairie View A&M	Mia Nunez; Prairie View A&M	Zoryana Hughes; Florida A&M	East - Camise Patterson; Florida A&M; West - Vernon Bland Prairie View A&M	2024 Southwestern Athletic Conference softball tournament	Gulfport Sportsplex • Gulfport, MS	Jackson State
Summit League	South Dakota State	Mia Jarecki; South Dakota State	Kamryn Meyer; Omaha	Mike Heard; Omaha	2024 Summit League softball tournament	Jackrabbit Softball Stadium • Brookings, SD	Omaha
Sun Belt Conference	Louisiana	Mihyia Davis; Louisiana	Jessica Mullins; Texas State	Gerry Glasco; Louisiana	2024 Sun Belt Conference softball tournament	Bobcat Softball Stadium • San Marcos, TX	Texas State
West Coast Conference	Saint Mary's	Hazyl Gray, Santa Clara	Jenna Perez, Loyola Marymount & Odhi Vasquez, Saint Mary's	Sonja Garnett, Saint Mary's	No Tournament, regular season champion earns auto bid		
Western Athletic Conference	Grand Canyon	Ashley Trierweiler; Grand Canyon	Hailey Hudson; Grand Canyon	Shanon Hays; Grand Canyon	2024 Western Athletic Conference softball tournament	Logan Field • Seattle, WA	Grand Canyon

== Awards ==
- USA Softball Collegiate Player of the Year: NiJaree Canady, Stanford
- NFCA National Player of the Year: Jocelyn Erickson, Florida|
- Softball America Player of the Year: Reese Atwood, Texas
- NFCA National Pitcher of the Year: NiJaree Canady, Stanford
- Softball America Pitcher of the Year: NiJaree Canady, Stanford
- NFCA National Freshman of the Year: Jaysoni Beachum, Florida State
- Softball America Freshman of the Year: Jaysoni Beachum, Florida State
- Softball America Defensive Player of the Year: Jocelyn Erickson, Florida
- NFCA Catcher of the Year: Jocelyn Erickson, Florida
- NFCA Golden Shoe Award: Megan Delgadillo, Cal State Fullerton

== All-America Teams ==
The following players were members of the All-American Teams.

First Team

Position	Player	Class	School
P	NiJaree Canady	SO.	Stanford
P	Lexi Kilfoyl	GS	Oklahoma State
P	Karlyn Pickens	SO	Tennessee
C	Jocelyn Erickson	JR.	Florida
1B	Shaylon Govan	SR.	Baylor
2B	Aminah Vega	SO.	Duke
3B	Alyssa Brito	SR.	Oklahoma
SS	Tiare Jennings	SR.	Oklahoma
OF	Claire Davidson	SR.	Duke
OF	Emma Ritter	SR.	Virginia Tech
OF	Korbe Otis	JR.	Florida
UT	Valerie Cagle	SR.	Clemson
UT	Reese Atwood	SO.	Texas
AT-L	Payton Gottshall	GS	Tennessee
AT-L	Maya Brady	R-SR.	UCLA
AT-L	Jessica Mullins	SR.	Texas State
AT-L	Brooke Nelson	GS	Washington
AT-L	Addy Greene	SR.	Virginia Tech

Second Team

Position	Player	Class	School
P	Sydney Berzon	SO.	LSU
P	Emiley Kennedy	JR.	Texas A&M
P	Jala Wright	SR.	Duke
C	Sharlize Palacios	R-SR.	UCLA
1B	Bri Ellis	JR.	Arkansas
2B	Elon Butler	SO.	Cal
3B	Jaysoni Beachum	FR.	Florida State
SS	Skylar Wallace	R-SR.	Florida
OF	Jayda Coleman	SR.	Oklahoma
OF	Cori McMillan	JR.	Virginia Tech
OF	Addison Barnard	SR.	Wichita State
UT	Morgan Smith	SR.	Rutgers
UT	CC Wong	SR.	Wichita State
AT-L	Madisyn Kennedy	SR.	Mississippi State
AT-L	Kinzie Hansen	GS	Oklahoma
AT-L	Olivia Lackie	SR.	South Alabama
AT-L	Jess Oakland	SO.	Minnesota
AT-L	Kayla Beaver	GS	Alabama

Third Team

Position	Player	Class	School
P	Maddia Groff	FR.	Southern Illinois
P	Maddie Penta	SR.	Auburn
P	Morgan Leinstock	R-SR.	Arkansas
C	Caroline Wang	SR.	Oklahoma State
1B	Karina Gaskins	SR.	Notre Dame
2B	Maddie Moore	SR.	Clemson
3B	Karli Spaid	SR.	Miami (OH)
SS	Erin Coffel	SR.	Kentucky
OF	Kelsey Nader	SO.	Northwestern
OF	Abby Dayton	SO.	Utah
OF	Dakota Kennedy	SO.	Arizona
UT	Trinity Schlotterbeck	GS	Florida Atlantic
UT	Ella Parker	SO.	Oklahoma
AT-L	Michaela Edenfield	R-JR.	Florida State
AT-L	Keagan Rothrock	FR.	Florida
AT-L	Billie Andrews	SR.	Nebraska
AT-L	Jenna Golembiewski	JR.	Miami (OH)
AT-L	Alana Vawter	SR.	South Carolina
AT-L	Reagan Walsh	JR.	Florida

== See also ==
- 2024 NCAA Division I baseball season
