= Kristi Bredbenner =

American softball coach

Current position
- Title: Head coach
- Team: Wichita State
- Conference: American Athletic Conference
- Record: 392–286–1 (.578)

Biographical details
- Born: O'Fallon, Missouri, U.S.
- Education: Truman State (2001); Azusa Pacific (2005)

Playing career
- 1998–2001: Truman State

Coaching career (HC unless noted)
- 2002: Truman State (interim)
- 2003–2005: UC Santa Barbara (asst.)
- 2006–2011: Emporia State
- 2012–Present: Witchita State

Head coaching record
- Overall: 718–387–1 (.650)

Accomplishments and honors

Championships
- 4× MIAA Regular Season Champions (2006, 2007, 2008, 2010); 6× MIAA Tournament Champions (2002, 2006, 2007, 2008, 2009, 2010); 2× MVC Regular Season Champions (2014, 2016); MVC Tournament Champions (2016); 2× American Regular Season Champions (2021, 2023); American Tournament Champions (2021)

Awards
- 3× MIAA Coach of the Year (2007, 2008, 2010); MVC Coaching Staff of the Year (2014); 2× American Coaching Staff of the Year (2021, 2023)

Kristi Bredbenner is an American softball coach who is the current head coach at Witchita State.

== Early life and education ==
Bredbenner graduated from the Truman State University in 2001 with a bachelor's degree in business/marketing. She earned her master's in physical education in 2005 from Azusa Pacific University.

== Coaching career ==
=== Witchita State ===
On June 6, 2011, Bredbenner was announced as the new head coach of the Wichita State Shockers softball program.

On June 6, 2023, Bredbenner signed a contract extension to keep her as head coach through 2028.

== Honors and personal life ==
Bredbenner was inducted into the Truman Hall of Fame in 2014.

== Head coaching record ==
=== College ===
Record table
| Season | Team | Overall | Conference | Standing | Postseason |
|---|---|---|---|---|---|
Truman Bulldogs (Mid-America Intercollegiate Athletics Association) (2002)
| 2002 | Truman | 31–19 | 11–7 | 4th | NCAA DII Regional |
| Truman: | | 31–19 (.620) | 11–7 (.611) | | |
Emporia State Hornets (Mid-America Intercollegiate Athletics Association) (2006–2011)
| 2006 | Emporia State | 62–7 | 15–1 | 1st | NCAA DII World Series Runner-up |
| 2007 | Emporia State | 50–12 | 15–3 | 1st | NCAA DII Regional Runner-Up |
| 2008 | Emporia State | 48–17 | 15–3 | 1st | NCAA DII World Series Runner-up |
| 2009 | Emporia State | 48–17 | 15–5 | | NCAA DII Regional |
| 2010 | Emporia State | 50–14 | 18–2 | 1st | NCAA DII Regional |
| 2011 | Emporia State | 42–16 | 18–4 | | NCAA DII Regional |
| Emporia State: | | 295–82 (.782) | 81–17 (.827) | | |
Witchita State Shockers (Missouri Valley Conference) (2012–2017)
| 2012 | Wichita State | 15–40 | 7–20 | 9th | |
| 2013 | Wichita State | 19–33 | 10–15 | | |
| 2014 | Wichita State | 34–21 | 21–6 | 1st | |
| 2015 | Wichita State | 34–23 | 16–11 | 4th | |
| 2016 | Wichita State | 36–21 | 18–6 | 1st | NCAA Regional |
| 2017 | Wichita State | 32–20 | 16–9 | 4th | |
Witchita State Shockers (American Athletic Conference) (2018–Present)
| 2018 | Wichita State | 32–23 | 12–9 | 4th | NCAA Regional |
| 2019 | Wichita State | 32–24 | 12–9 | 4th | |
| 2020 | Wichita State | 11–16 | 0–0 | | Season canceled due to COVID-19 |
| 2021 | Wichita State | 41–13–1 | 18–5–1 | 1st | NCAA Regional |
| 2022 | Wichita State | 34–18 | 14–4 | 2nd | NCAA Regional |
| 2023 | Wichita State | 44–12 | 16–2 | 1st | NCAA Regional |
| 2024 | Wichita State | 28–22 | 16-11 | | |
| 2025 | Wichita State | 0–0 | 0–0 | | |
| 2026 | Wichita State | 0–0 | 0–0 | | |
| Wichita State: | | 392–286–1 (.578) | 188–118–1 (.614) | | |
| Total: | | 718–387–1 (.650) | | | |
National champion Postseason invitational champion Conference regular season champion Conference regular season and conference tournament champion Division regular season champion Division regular season and conference tournament champion Conference tournament champion
