= 2015 Missouri Valley Conference softball tournament =

The 2015 Missouri Valley Conference (MVC) softball tournament was held at Wilkins Stadium on the campus of Wichita State University in Wichita, Kansas, from May 7 through May 9, 2015. The tournament winner will earn the MVC's automatic bid to the 2015 NCAA Division I softball tournament. All games will be televised on ESPN3 with R.C. McBrdie and Laura Leonard calling the action.

== Tournament ==
First round
5	Southern Illinois	3
8	Indiana State	5
6	Bradley	7
7	Illinois State	11

Second round
4	Wichita State	1
8	Indiana State	5
3	Northern Iowa	2
7	Illinois State	8

Semifinals
1	Drake	1
8	Indiana State	2
2	Missouri State	3
7	Illinois State	1

Finals
8	Indiana State	9
2	Missouri State	2

- All times listed are Central Daylight Time.
