= 2024 Arkansas Razorbacks softball team =

American college softball season

2024 Arkansas Razorbacks softball

NCAA Fayetteville Regional, 1–2
- Conference: Southeastern Conference

Ranking
- Coaches: No. 16
- Record: 37–18 (14–10 SEC)
- Head coach: Courtney Deifel (9th season)
- Assistant coaches: DJ Gasso; Danielle Gibson Whorton Matt Meuchel
- Home stadium: Bogle Park

2024 Southeastern Conference softball standings
	Conf.						Overall
Team	W		L		T	PCT	W		L		T	PCT
No. 3 Tennessee ‍†‍‍	19	–	5	–	0	.792	44	–	12	–	0	.786
No. 7 Florida ‍‍‡‍^{y}	17	–	7	–	0	.708	53	–	14	–	0	.791
No. 9 Texas A&M ‍‍‍^{y}	15	–	9	–	0	.625	44	–	15	–	0	.746
No. 16 Arkansas ‍‍‍^{y}	14	–	10	–	0	.583	37	–	18	–	0	.673
No. 10 Missouri ‍‍‍^{y}	13	–	11	–	0	.542	48	–	18	–	0	.727
No. 11 LSU ‍‍‍^{y}	12	–	12	–	0	.500	44	–	17	–	0	.721
No. 14 Georgia ‍‍‍^{y}	12	–	12	–	0	.500	43	–	19	–	0	.694
No. 18 Mississippi State ‍‍‍^{y}	12	–	12	–	0	.500	34	–	20	–	0	.630
No. 19 Alabama ‍‍‍^{y}	10	–	14	–	0	.417	38	–	20	–	0	.655
Auburn ‍‍‍^{y}	9	–	15	–	0	.375	29	–	21	–	1	.578
South Carolina ‍‍‍^{y}	8	–	16	–	0	.333	36	–	24	–	0	.600
Kentucky ‍‍‍^{y}	8	–	16	–	0	.333	31	–	24	–	0	.564
Ole Miss ‍‍‍^{y}	7	–	17	–	0	.292	31	–	27	–	0	.534
† – Conference champion ‡ – Tournament champion y – Invited to the NCAA tournament As of June 2, 2024; Rankings from NFCA/USA Today

The 2024 Arkansas Razorbacks softball team represented the University of Arkansas in the 2024 NCAA Division I softball season. The Razorbacks were led by ninth-year head coach Courtney Deifel and played their home games at Bogle Park in Fayetteville, Arkansas.

== Previous season ==
After a 38–16 regular-season campaign in 2023, the Razorbacks fell in their first game of the SEC tournament, which was hosted at Bogle Park, to Alabama by a one-run margin. Arkansas was selected to host an NCAA regional for the third consecutive season as the No. 11 national seed. They were paired with Oregon, Notre Dame, and Harvard; After a defeat of Harvard, the Razorbacks fell to Oregon, putting them in the consolation bracket. A win to eliminate Notre Dame put them in the regional final, needing two wins against Oregon to advance to the super regional, but a nine-run defeat to the Ducks ended Arkansas' season. The team finished with a record of 40–19.

== Schedule and results ==
Legend
	Arkansas win
	Arkansas loss
	Postponement
**Bold**	Arkansas team member

2024 Arkansas Razorbacks softball game log
Regular season

February (14–3)
Date	Opponent	Rank	Site/stadium	Score	Win	Loss	Save	TV	Attendance	Overall record	SEC record
Paradise Classic
February 8	vs. Marshall	No. 16	Joan Joyce Field; Boca Raton, Florida	**W** 10–3	**Camenzind** (1–0)	Rice (0–1)		FloSoftball	400	1–0	—
February 8	at Florida Atlantic	No. 16	Joan Joyce Field	**W** 8–0 (5)	**Herron** (1–0)	Schlotterbec (0–1)		FloSoftball	500	2–0	—
February 9	vs. Ohio	No. 16	Joan Joyce Field	**W** 7–3	**Leinstock** (1–0)	Moore (0–1)		FloSoftball		3–0	—
February 10	vs. Michigan State	No. 16	Joan Joyce Field	**W** 6–5	**Herron** (2–0)	Grey (0–2)		FloSoftball	263	4–0	—
February 10	vs. Penn State	No. 16	Joan Joyce Field	**L** 2–3 (8)	Nemeth (3–0)	**Herron** (2–1)		FloSoftball	255	4–1	—
Bear Down Fiesta
February 16	vs. Long Beach State	No. 15	Hillenbrand Stadium; Tucson, Arizona	**W** 7–0	**Leinstock** (2–0)	Haddad (0–3)		FloSoftball		5–1	—
February 16	at Arizona	No. 15	Hillenbrand Stadium	**L** 2–3	Silva (4–0)	**Herron** (2–2)		FloSoftball		5–2	—
February 17	vs. Omaha	No. 15	Hillenbrand Stadium	**W** 9–2	**McGaffin** (1–0)	Meyer (3–1)		FloSoftball		6–2	—
February 17	at Arizona	No. 15	Hillenbrand Stadium	**W** 3–2	**Herron** (3–2)	Stoddard (2–1)		FloSoftball	2,292	7–2	—
February 18	vs. Omaha	No. 15	Hillenbrand Stadium	**W** 5–2	**Leinstock** (4–0)	Nuismer (3–2)		FloSoftball		8–2	—
Razorback Invitational
February 22	Illinois State	No. 15	Bogle Park; Fayetteville, Arkansas	**W** 7–0	**Beuerlein** (1–0)	McLeod (0–1)			2,824	9–2	—
February 23	UT Arlington	No. 15	Bogle Park	**W** 9–0 (6)	**Camenzind** (2–0)	Gutierrez (1–1)			3,108	10–2	—
February 23	Wichita State	No. 15	Bogle Park	**L** 1–3	Barber (2–0)	**Herron** (3–3)			3,108	10–3	—
February 24	Illinois State	No. 15	Bogle Park	**W** 7–0	**Herron** (4–3)	Meshnick (1–6)			3,549	11–3	—
February 24	Wichita State	No. 15	Bogle Park	**W** 15–4 (5)	**Camenzind** (3–0)	Aguilar (2–1)			3,549	12–3	—
February 25	UT Arlington	No. 15	Bogle Park	**W** 10–0 (5)	**Beuerlein** (2–0)	Bumpurs (0–4)			3,019	13–3	—
Wooo Pig Classic
February 29	South Dakota State	No. 15	Bogle Park	**W** 4–3	**Camenzind** (4–0)	Lasey (2–3)		SECN+	2,795	14–3	—

March (11–6)
Date	Opponent	Rank	Site/stadium	Score	Win	Loss	Save	TV	Attendance	Overall record	SEC record
March 1	Southeast Missouri State	No. 15	Bogle Park	**W** 5–0	**Leinstock** (4–0)	Holman (2–3)		SECN+	2,933	15–3	—
March 1	Florida Atlantic	No. 15	Bogle Park	**W** 6–2	**Herron** (5–3)	Sacco (5–2)		SECN+	2,933	16–3	—
March 2	South Dakota State	No. 15	Bogle Park	**L** 3–7	Kniesche (6–4)	**Herron** (5–4)		SECN+	3,252	16–4	—
March 3	Southeast Missouri State	No. 15	Bogle Park	**W** 6–5 (8)	**Herron** (6–4)	Holman (2–5)		SECN+	2,959	17–4	—
Razorback Rumble
March 8	South Alabama	No. 18	Bogle Park	**L** 1–2	Lackie (9–3)	**Herron** (6–5)		SECN+	3,010	17–5	—
March 8	Saint Francis	No. 18	Bogle Park	Canceled							
March 9	Northern Iowa	No. 18	Bogle Park	**W** 7–4	**Leinstock** (5–0)	Maiers (1–1)	**Camenzind** (1)	SECN+	3,067	18–5	—
March 9	South Alabama	No. 18	Bogle Park	**W** 10–4	**Camenzind** (5–0)	Lagle (2–1)		SECN+	3,067	19–5	—
March 10	Northern Iowa	No. 18	Bogle Park	**W** 9–0 (6)	**Herron** (7–5)	Wischnowski (6–3)		SECN+	2,943	20–5	—
March 16	at No. 25 Auburn	No. 20	Jane B. Moore Field; Auburn, Alabama	**W** 6–1	**Leinstock** (6–0)	Penta (7–4)		SECN+		21–5	1–0
March 16	at No. 25 Auburn	No. 20	Jane B. Moore Field	**W** 5–1	**Camenzind** (6–0)	Lowe (3–1)		SECN+	1,845	22–5	2–0
March 17	at No. 25 Auburn	No. 20	Jane B. Moore Field	**L** 1–2	Penta (8–4)	**Herron** (7–6)		SECN+	1,620	22–6	2–1
March 18	at Texas A&M–Commerce	No. 20	John Cain Family Softball Complex; Commerce, Texas	**W** 8–0 (5)	**Camenzind** (7–0)	Sanchez (3–7)		SECN+	356	23–6	—
March 22	No. 20 Mississippi State	No. 18	Bogle Park	**L** 3–6	Wesley (7–2)	**Leinstock** (6–1)		SECN+	3,466	23–7	2–2
March 23	No. 20 Mississippi State	No. 18	Bogle Park	**W** 3–0	**Camenzind** (7–0)	Marron (8–3)	**Leinstock** (1)	SECN+	3,811	24–7	3–2
March 24	No. 20 Mississippi State	No. 18	Bogle Park	**L** 7–15 (5)	Wesley (9–2)	**Leinstock** (6–2)		SECN+	3,143	24–8	3–3
March 26	Central Arkansas	No. 20	Bogle Park	Canceled							
March 30	at No. 3 Georgia	No. 20	Jack Turner Stadium; Athens, Georgia	**W** 3–2	**Leinstock** (7–2)	Backes (12–2)		SEC Network	1,863	25–8	4–3
March 31	at No. 3 Georgia	No. 20	Jack Turner Stadium	**L** 2–8	Kerpics (9–1)	**Camenzind** (8–1)	Walters (2)	ESPN2	851	25–9	4–4

April (10–4)
Date	Opponent	Rank	Site/stadium	Score	Win	Loss	Save	TV	Attendance	Overall record	SEC record
April 1	at No. 3 Georgia	No. 20	Jack Turner Stadium	**W** 8–2	**Leinstock** (8–2)	Backes (12–3)		SEC Network	2,057	26–9	5–4
April 5	No. 11 Missouri	No. 19	Bogle Park	**W** 5–2	**Leinstock** (9–2)	Harrison (10–2)		SEC Network	3,412	27–9	6–4
April 6	No. 11 Missouri	No. 19	Bogle Park	**L** 3–12 (5)	Krings (9–6)	**Herron** (7–7)		SECN+	3,885	27–10	6–5
April 7	No. 11 Missouri	No. 19	Bogle Park	**W** 4–1	**Leinstock** (10–2)	McCann (6–2)		SEC Network	3,457	28–10	7–5
April 12	at No. 23 South Carolina	No. 17	Beckham Field; Columbia, South Carolina	**W** 4–3	**Herron** (8–7)	Vawter (11–7)		SEC Network	1,627	29–10	8–5
April 13	at No. 23 South Carolina	No. 17	Beckham Field	**L** 1–2	Mardjetko (7–6)	**Beuerlein** (2–1)	Vawter (2)	SEC Network	1,837	29–11	8–6
April 14	at No. 23 South Carolina	No. 17	Beckham Field	**W** 3–0	**Herron** (9–7)	Vawter (12–8)		SECN+	1,748	30–11	9–6
April 19	No. 14 Alabama	No. 16	Bogle Park	**W** 1–0 (9)	**Leinstock** (11–2)	Beaver (14–5)		SECN+	3,839	31–11	10–6
April 20	No. 14 Alabama	No. 16	Bogle Park	**L** 1–5	Briski (7–2)	**Herron** (9–8)		SEC Network	3,900	31–12	10–7
April 21	No. 14 Alabama	No. 16	Bogle Park	**W** 8–0 (5)	**Leinstock** (12–2)	Beaver (14–6)		ESPNU	3,832	32–12	11–7
April 26	at No. 6 LSU	No. 15	Tiger Park; Baton Rouge, Louisiana	**W** 2–1	**Leinstock** (13–2)	Berzon (15–7)		SECN+	2,352	33–12	12–7
April 27	at No. 6 LSU	No. 15	Tiger Park	**W** 4–1	**Camenzind** (9–1)	Lynch (6–2)	**Leinstock** (2)	SECN+	2,619	34–12	13–7
April 28	at No. 6 LSU	No. 15	Tiger Park	**L** 0–1	Berzon (16–7)	**Beuerlein** (2–2)		SECN+	2,266	34–13	13–8
April 30	at Central Arkansas	No. 15	Farris Field; Conway, Arkansas	**W** 8–0 (6)	**Herron** (10–8)	Petty (13–11)		SECN+	2,155	35–13	—

May (1–2)
Date	Opponent	Rank	Site/stadium	Score	Win	Loss	Save	TV	Attendance	Overall record	SEC record
May 3	Ole Miss	No. 15	Bogle Park	**L** 0–6	Sparks (7–2)	**Leinstock** (13–3)		SECN+	2,800	35–14	13–9
May 4	Ole Miss	No. 15	Bogle Park	**W** 12–2 (5)	**Herron** (11–8)	Lopez (6–4)		SEC Network	3,592	36–14	14–9
May 5	Ole Miss	No. 15	Bogle Park	**L** 3–4	Sparks (8–2)	**Leinstock** (13–4)	Lopez (2)	SEC Network	3,937	36–15	14–10

Postseason

SEC Tournament (0–1)
Date	Opponent	Rank	Site/stadium	Score	Win	Loss	Save	TV	Attendance	Overall record	SECT record
May 9	vs. No. 11 (5) Missouri	No. 16 (4)	Jane B. Moore Field	**L** 1–3	Harrison (14–3)	**Leinstock** (13–5)	Pannell (14)	SECN	2,042	36–16	0–1

NCAA Fayetteville Regional (1–2)
Date	Opponent	Rank	Site/stadium	Score	Win	Loss	Save	TV	Attendance	Overall record	NCAAT record
May 17	vs. (4) Southeast Missouri State	No. 16 (1)	Bogle Park	**W** 3–2	**Herron** (12–8)	Holman (16–1)		ESPN+	2,655	37–16	1–0
May 18	vs. No. 17 (2) Arizona	No. 16 (1)	Bogle Park	**L** 1–2	Mannon (7–3)	**Herron** (12–9)	Silva (3)	ESPN+	2,667	37–17	1–1
May 18	vs. (3) Villanova	No. 16 (1)	Bogle Park	**L** 2–7	Gallant (6–5)	**Leinstock** (13–6)		ESPN+	2,440	37–18	1–2

*Denotes non–conference game • Schedule source • Rankings based on the teams' current ranking in the NFCA/USA Today poll
**W** Arkansas win • **L** Arkansas loss • Postponement or cancellation • **Bold** denotes Arkansas player

== Record vs. conference opponents ==
Date m/dd is for last scheduled game of series. Blank are not scheduled. Blue are home games, otherwise away.

2024 SEC softball records Source: 2024 SEC softball game results, 2024 SEC softball schedule
Team	W–L	ALA	ARK	AUB	FLA	UGA	KEN	LSU	MSU	MIZZ	MISS	SCAR	TENN	TAMU	Team	SR	SW
ALA	10–14		1–2	1–2	1–2	1–2	1–2	.	.	.	3–0	.	1–2	1–2	ALA	1–7	1–0
ARK	14–10	2–1		2–1	.	2–1	.	2–1	1–2	2–1	1–2	2–1	.	.	ARK	6–2	0–0
AUB	9–15	2–1	1–2		.	.	1–2	2–1	.	1–2	1–2	.	1–2	0–3	AUB	2–6	0–1
FLA	17–7	2–1	.	.		2–1	3–0	2–1	2–1	1–2	.	2–1	.	3–0	FLA	7–1	2–0
UGA	12–12	2–1	1–2	.	1–2		1–2	.	1–2	2–1	3–0	.	1–2	.	UGA	3–5	1–0
KEN	8–16	2–1	.	2–1	0–3	2–1		0–3	.	.	.	1–2	0–3	1–2	KEN	3–5	0–3
LSU	12–12	.	1–2	1–2	1–2	.	3–0		.	1–2	1–2	.	1–2	3–0	LSU	2–6	2–0
MSU	12–12	.	2–1	.	1–2	2–1	.	.		1–2	2–1	2–1	1–2	1–2	MSU	4–4	0–0
MIZZ	13–11	.	1–2	2–1	2–1	1–2	.	2–1	2–1		.	3–0	0–3	.	MIZZ	5–3	1–1
MISS	7–17	0–3	2–1	2–1	.	0–3	.	2–1	1–2	.		0–3	.	0–3	MISS	3–5	0–4
SCAR	8–16	.	1–2	.	1–2	.	2–1	.	1–2	0–3	3–0		0–3	0–3	SCAR	2–6	1–3
TENN	19–5	2–1	.	2–1	.	2–1	3–0	2–1	2–1	3–0	.	3–0		.	TENN	8–0	3–0
TAMU	15–9	2–1	.	3–0	0–3	.	2–1	0–3	2–1	.	3–0	3–0	.		TAMU	6–2	3–2
Team	W–L	ALA	ARK	AUB	FLA	UGA	KEN	LSU	MSU	MIZZ	MISS	SCAR	TENN	TAMU	Team	SR	SW

Updated for entire regular season. Tie brkrs: MSU>UGA & MSU>LSU ARK common. UGA>LSU MIZZ common. SCAR>KEN head to head.

== Rankings ==
Ranking movements Legend: ██ Increase in ranking ██ Decrease in ranking
	Week																
Poll	Pre	1	2	3	4	5	6	7	8	9	10	11	12	13	14	15	Final
NFCA / USA Today	16	15	15	15	18	20	18	20	19	17	16	15	15	16	16		
Softball America	8	12	14	18	21	20	17	20	17	13	8	8	8	11	11		
ESPN.com/USA Softball	12	13	14	16	20	20	17	20	19	14	14	13	11	13	11		
D1Softball	18	18	15	16	22	19	17	19	14	11	13	12	8	9	9		

== See also ==
- 2024 Arkansas Razorbacks baseball team
