= 2024 SEC softball tournament =

Postseason collegiate softball tournament

2024 Southeastern Conference softball tournament
- Teams: 13
- Format: Single-elimination tournament
- Finals site: Jane B. Moore Field; Auburn, Alabama
- Champions: Florida (6th title)
- Runner-up: Missouri
- Winning coach: Tim Walton (6th title)
- MVP: Skylar Wallace (Florida)
- Television: SEC Network; ESPN2

2024 Southeastern Conference softball standings
	Conf.						Overall
Team	W		L		T	PCT	W		L		T	PCT
No. 3 Tennessee ‍†‍‍	19	–	5	–	0	.792	44	–	12	–	0	.786
No. 7 Florida ‍‍‡‍^{y}	17	–	7	–	0	.708	53	–	14	–	0	.791
No. 9 Texas A&M ‍‍‍^{y}	15	–	9	–	0	.625	44	–	15	–	0	.746
No. 16 Arkansas ‍‍‍^{y}	14	–	10	–	0	.583	37	–	18	–	0	.673
No. 10 Missouri ‍‍‍^{y}	13	–	11	–	0	.542	48	–	18	–	0	.727
No. 11 LSU ‍‍‍^{y}	12	–	12	–	0	.500	44	–	17	–	0	.721
No. 14 Georgia ‍‍‍^{y}	12	–	12	–	0	.500	43	–	19	–	0	.694
No. 18 Mississippi State ‍‍‍^{y}	12	–	12	–	0	.500	34	–	20	–	0	.630
No. 19 Alabama ‍‍‍^{y}	10	–	14	–	0	.417	38	–	20	–	0	.655
Auburn ‍‍‍^{y}	9	–	15	–	0	.375	29	–	21	–	1	.578
South Carolina ‍‍‍^{y}	8	–	16	–	0	.333	36	–	24	–	0	.600
Kentucky ‍‍‍^{y}	8	–	16	–	0	.333	31	–	24	–	0	.564
Ole Miss ‍‍‍^{y}	7	–	17	–	0	.292	31	–	27	–	0	.534
† – Conference champion ‡ – Tournament champion y – Invited to the NCAA tournament As of June 2, 2024; Rankings from NFCA/USA Today

The 2024 Southeastern Conference Softball Tournament, played for the 2024 Southeastern Conference softball season, was the postseason softball tournament that determined the 2024 champion of the Southeastern Conference. It was held at Jane B. Moore Field in Auburn, Alabama from May 7–11, 2024. As the tournament winner, Florida earned the Southeastern Conference's automatic bid to the 2024 NCAA Division I softball tournament. All 12 tournament games were televised, the earlier nine games on the SEC Network and the semifinals and the championship game on ESPN2.

== Format ==
All thirteen teams will be seeded based on conference winning percentage. They then will play a single-elimination tournament, with the top four seeds receiving a single bye, and the bottom two playing the first-round game on May 9. The 13 team format has been the same since 2019.

== Record vs. conference opponents ==
Date m/dd is for last scheduled game of series. Blank are not scheduled. Blue are home games, otherwise away.

2024 SEC softball records Source: 2024 SEC softball game results, 2024 SEC softball schedule
Team	W–L	ALA	ARK	AUB	FLA	UGA	KEN	LSU	MSU	MIZZ	MISS	SCAR	TENN	TAMU	Team	SR	SW
ALA	10–14		1–2	1–2	1–2	1–2	1–2	.	.	.	3–0	.	1–2	1–2	ALA	1–7	1–0
ARK	14–10	2–1		2–1	.	2–1	.	2–1	1–2	2–1	1–2	2–1	.	.	ARK	6–2	0–0
AUB	9–15	2–1	1–2		.	.	1–2	2–1	.	1–2	1–2	.	1–2	0–3	AUB	2–6	0–1
FLA	17–7	2–1	.	.		2–1	3–0	2–1	2–1	1–2	.	2–1	.	3–0	FLA	7–1	2–0
UGA	12–12	2–1	1–2	.	1–2		1–2	.	1–2	2–1	3–0	.	1–2	.	UGA	3–5	1–0
KEN	8–16	2–1	.	2–1	0–3	2–1		0–3	.	.	.	1–2	0–3	1–2	KEN	3–5	0–3
LSU	12–12	.	1–2	1–2	1–2	.	3–0		.	1–2	1–2	.	1–2	3–0	LSU	2–6	2–0
MSU	12–12	.	2–1	.	1–2	2–1	.	.		1–2	2–1	2–1	1–2	1–2	MSU	4–4	0–0
MIZZ	13–11	.	1–2	2–1	2–1	1–2	.	2–1	2–1		.	3–0	0–3	.	MIZZ	5–3	1–1
MISS	7–17	0–3	2–1	2–1	.	0–3	.	2–1	1–2	.		0–3	.	0–3	MISS	3–5	0–4
SCAR	8–16	.	1–2	.	1–2	.	2–1	.	1–2	0–3	3–0		0–3	0–3	SCAR	2–6	1–3
TENN	19–5	2–1	.	2–1	.	2–1	3–0	2–1	2–1	3–0	.	3–0		.	TENN	8–0	3–0
TAMU	15–9	2–1	.	3–0	0–3	.	2–1	0–3	2–1	.	3–0	3–0	.		TAMU	6–2	3–2
Team	W–L	ALA	ARK	AUB	FLA	UGA	KEN	LSU	MSU	MIZZ	MISS	SCAR	TENN	TAMU	Team	SR	SW

Updated for entire regular season. Tie brkrs: MSU>UGA & MSU>LSU ARK common. UGA>LSU MIZZ common. SCAR>KEN head to head.

== Bracket ==
First Round; Tuesday, May 9
12	Kentucky	2
13	Ole Miss	7

Second Round; Wednesday, May 10
8	LSU	3^{14}
9	Alabama	2
5	Missouri	3
13	Ole Miss	1
6	Mississippi State	4
11	South Carolina	8
7	Georgia	6^{14}
10	Auburn	5

Quarterfinals; Thursday, May 11
1	Tennessee	1
8	LSU	2
4	Arkansas	1
5	Missouri	3
3	Texas A&M	3
11	South Carolina	2
2	Florida	9
7	Georgia	4

Semifinals; Friday, May 12
8	LSU	1
5	Missouri	2^{8}
3	Texas A&M	3
2	Florida	7

Championship; Saturday, May 13
5	Missouri	1
2	Florida	6

== Schedule ==
Game	Time*	Matchup^{#}	Score	Television	Attendance
First Round – Tuesday, May 7
1	7:00 p.m.	No. 12 Kentucky vs. No. 13 Ole Miss	2−7	SEC Network	1,905
Second Round – Wednesday, May 8
2	11:00 a.m.	No. 8 LSU vs. No. 9 Alabama	3−2^{14}	SEC Network	2,086
3	3:28 p.m.	No. 5 Missouri vs. No. 13 Ole Miss	3−1	SEC Network	2,086
4	6:00 p.m.	No. 7 Georgia vs. No. 10 Auburn	6-5^{14}	SEC Network	2,086
5	10:06 p.m.	No. 6 Mississippi State vs. No. 11 South Carolina	4−8	SEC Network	2,086
Quarterfinals – Thursday, May 9
6	6:00 p.m.	No. 1 Tennessee vs. No. 8 LSU	1−2	SEC Network	2,042
7	9:07 p.m.	No. 4 Arkansas vs. No. 5 Missouri	1−3	SEC Network	2,042
Quarterfinals – Friday, May 10
8	11:32 a.m.	No. 2 Florida vs. No. 7 Georgia	9−4	SEC Network	2,130
9	2:23 p.m.	No. 3 Texas A&M vs. No. 11 South Carolina	3−2	SEC Network	2,130
Semifinals – Friday, May 10
10	5:04 p.m.	No. 8 LSU vs. No. 5 Missouri	1−2^{8}	ESPN2	1,998
11	8:00 p.m.	No. 2 Florida vs. No. 3 Texas A&M	7−3	ESPN2	1,998
Championship – Saturday, May 11
12	5:00 p.m.	No. 5 Missouri vs. No. 2 Florida	1−6	ESPN2	2,094
*Game times in EDT. # – Rankings denote tournament seed.
