= 2024 Summit League softball tournament =

- Teams: 6
- Format: Double-elimination
- Finals site: Jackrabbit Softball Stadium; Brookings, South Dakota
- Champions: Omaha (2nd title)
- Runner-up: South Dakota State (5th title game)
- Winning coach: Mike Heard (2nd title)
- MVP: Kamryn Meyer (Omaha)
- Attendance: 2,205
- Television: MidcoSN, Summit League Network

2024 Summit League softball standings
	Conf.				Overall
Team	W		L	PCT	W		L	PCT
South Dakota State ‍†‍‍	14	–	2	.875	33	–	22	.600
Omaha ‍‍‡‍^{y}	14	–	4	.778	43	–	15	.741
St. Thomas* ‍‍‍	8	–	9	.471	16	–	34	.320
Kansas City ‍‍‍	8	–	10	.444	23	–	32	.418
South Dakota ‍‍‍	7	–	10	.412	23	–	30	.434
North Dakota ‍‍‍	6	–	12	.333	14	–	42	.250
North Dakota State ‍‍‍	4	–	14	.222	17	–	37	.315
† – Conference champion ‡ – Tournament champion y – Invited to the NCAA tournament * Ineligible for the 2024 NCAA tournament due to transition from Division III; As of May 19, 2024; Rankings from NFCA/USA Today

The 2024 Summit League softball tournament took place from May 8–11, 2024. All six eligible teams of the league's seven (St. Thomas is ineligible) met in the modified double-elimination tournament at Jackrabbit Softball Stadium on the campus of South Dakota State University in Brookings, South Dakota. Omaha was the defending champion and repeated as the champion, earning the Summit League's automatic bid to the 2024 NCAA Division I softball tournament.

== Standings ==
Place	Seed	Team	Conference			Overall		
Place	Seed	Team	W	L	%	W	L	%
1	1	South Dakota State	14	2	.875	31	20	.608
2	2	Omaha	14	4	.778	36	12	.750
3		St. Thomas	8	9	.471	16	34	.320
4	3	Kansas City	8	10	.444	21	30	.412
5	4	South Dakota	7	10	.412	22	28	.440
6	5	North Dakota	6	12	.333	14	41	.255
7	6	North Dakota State	4	14	.222	17	36	.321

- St. Thomas is ineligible for postseason tournaments through 2026

== Format and seeding ==
All eligible finishers from the regular season were seeded one through six based on conference winning percentage during the conference's regular season. The tournament will play out as a modified double-elimination tournament, with the bottom four seeds playing each other in the single-elimination first round and the rest of the tournament as double-elimination. Due to their transition from Division III to Division I, St. Thomas is ineligible for the Summit League and NCAA tournaments until 2026.

== Schedule and results ==
Game	Time*	Matchup^{#}	Television	Location	Attendance
First Round – Wednesday, May 8
1	1:00 PM	No. 4 South Dakota 6 vs. No. 5 North Dakota 5	SLN	Jackrabbit Softball Stadium	147
2	3:30 PM	No. 3 Kansas City 5 vs. No. 6 North Dakota State 2	SLN	Jackrabbit Softball Stadium	179
Quarterfinals – Thursday, May 9
3	11:00 AM	No. 1 South Dakota State 7 vs. No. 4 South Dakota 0	SLN	Jackrabbit Softball Stadium	298
4	1:30 PM	No. 2 Omaha 1 ^{(14)} vs. No. 3 Kansas City 0	SLN	Jackrabbit Softball Stadium	156
5	4:00 PM	No. 4 South Dakota 3 vs. No. 3 Kansas City 7	SLN	Jackrabbit Softball Stadium	156
Semifinals – Friday, May 10
6	1:00 PM	No. 1 South Dakota State 2 vs. No. 2 Omaha 1	MidcoSN/SLN	Jackrabbit Softball Stadium	360
7	3:30 PM	No. 2 Omaha 2 vs. No. 3 Kansas City 0	MidcoSN/SLN	Jackrabbit Softball Stadium	145
Finals – Saturday, May 11
8	1:00 PM	No. 1 South Dakota State 2 vs. No. 2 Omaha 5	MidcoSN/SLN	Jackrabbit Softball Stadium	382
9	3:30 PM	No. 2 Omaha 7 vs. No. 1 South Dakota State 0	MidcoSN/SLN	Jackrabbit Softball Stadium	382
*Game times in CDT. # - Rankings denote tournament seed. Reference:

== All-Tournament Team ==
The following players were named to the All-Tournament team:

Player	School
Kamryn Meyer (MVP)	Omaha
Maggie O'Brien	Omaha
Sydney Ross	Omaha
Ava Rongisch	Omaha
Lynsey Tucker	Omaha
Emma Osmundson	South Dakota State
Tori Kniesche	South Dakota State
Mia Jarecki	South Dakota State
Lindsey Culver	South Dakota State
Camryn Stickel	Kansas City
Sydney Nichols	Kansas City
Lexy Smith	Kansas City
Abi Brown	South Dakota
Delaney White	South Dakota
Ella Claus	North Dakota State
Mariah Peters	North Dakota
