= 2024 Southern Conference softball tournament =

- Teams: 8
- Format: Double-elimination tournament
- Finals site: UNCG Softball Stadium; Greensboro, North Carolina
- Champions: Chattanooga (16th title)
- Winning coach: Frank Reed (11th title)
- MVP: Peja Goold (Chattanooga)
- Television: ESPN+

2024 Southern Conference softball standings
	Conf.				Overall
Team	W		L	PCT	W		L	PCT
Chattanooga ‍†‍‡‍^{y}	16	–	5	.762	42	–	16	.724
UNC Greensboro ‍‍‍	13	–	8	.619	33	–	26	.559
Samford ‍‍‍	12	–	9	.571	24	–	32	.429
Wofford ‍‍‍	11	–	10	.524	23	–	24	.489
Mercer ‍‍‍	11	–	10	.524	23	–	30	.434
Furman ‍‍‍	9	–	12	.429	24	–	30	.444
Western Carolina ‍‍‍	7	–	14	.333	18	–	35	.340
East Tennessee State ‍‍‍	5	–	16	.238	11	–	39	.220
† – Conference champion ‡ – Tournament champion y – Invited to the NCAA tournament As of May 18, 2024; Rankings from NFCA/USA Today

The 2024 Southern Conference softball tournament was held at the UNCG Softball Stadium on the campus of the University of North Carolina at Greensboro in Greensboro, North Carolina, from May 8 through May 11, 2024. The tournament was won by the Chattanooga Mocs, who earned the Southern Conference's automatic bid to the 2024 NCAA Division I softball tournament.

== Tournament ==
=== Play-in round ===
Wednesday, May 8
Team	R
#7 Western Carolina	8
#6 Furman	6
Notes: Furman Eliminated

Wednesday, May 8
Team	R
#8 East Tennessee State	4
#5 Wofford	5
Notes: ETSU Eliminated

=== Bracket ===
Upper round 1
5	Wofford	0
4	Mercer	1
3	Samford	5
7	Western Carolina	2
Lower round 1
4	Mercer	2
7	Western Carolina	10
5	Wofford	3
3	Samford	4^{(10)}

Upper round 2
1	Chattanooga	10^{(5)}
4	Mercer	1
2	UNC Greensboro	13^{(5)}
3	Samford	5
Lower round 2
7	Western Carolina	1
3	Samford	4

Upper final
1	Chattanooga	4
2	UNC Greensboro	5
Lower final
1	Chattanooga	7
3	Samford	3

Final
2	UNC Greensboro	0	5
1	Chattanooga	5	9

== All Tournament Team ==
Player	Team
Maycin Brown	UNC Greensboro
Jorde Chartrand	UNC Greensboro
**Peja Goold**	Chattanooga
Kendall Forsythe	Chattanooga
Kaili Phillips	Chattanooga
McKenzie Newcomb	Samford
Katie Campbell	Samford
Lily Bell	Western Carolina
Tessa Juett	Western Carolina
Jeralynn Wells	Western Carolina

MVP in bold
