= 2024 South Carolina Gamecocks softball team =

American college softball season

2024 South Carolina Gamecocks softball

Durham Regional, 2-2
- Conference: Southeastern Conference
- Record: 36-24 (8-16 SEC)
- Head coach: Beverly Smith (13th season)
- Assistant coaches: Jake Epstein; Katie Repole
- Home stadium: Carolina Softball Stadium at Beckham Field

2024 Southeastern Conference softball standings
	Conf.						Overall
Team	W		L		T	PCT	W		L		T	PCT
No. 3 Tennessee ‍†‍‍	19	–	5	–	0	.792	44	–	12	–	0	.786
No. 7 Florida ‍‍‡‍^{y}	17	–	7	–	0	.708	53	–	14	–	0	.791
No. 9 Texas A&M ‍‍‍^{y}	15	–	9	–	0	.625	44	–	15	–	0	.746
No. 16 Arkansas ‍‍‍^{y}	14	–	10	–	0	.583	37	–	18	–	0	.673
No. 10 Missouri ‍‍‍^{y}	13	–	11	–	0	.542	48	–	18	–	0	.727
No. 11 LSU ‍‍‍^{y}	12	–	12	–	0	.500	44	–	17	–	0	.721
No. 14 Georgia ‍‍‍^{y}	12	–	12	–	0	.500	43	–	19	–	0	.694
No. 18 Mississippi State ‍‍‍^{y}	12	–	12	–	0	.500	34	–	20	–	0	.630
No. 19 Alabama ‍‍‍^{y}	10	–	14	–	0	.417	38	–	20	–	0	.655
Auburn ‍‍‍^{y}	9	–	15	–	0	.375	29	–	21	–	1	.578
South Carolina ‍‍‍^{y}	8	–	16	–	0	.333	36	–	24	–	0	.600
Kentucky ‍‍‍^{y}	8	–	16	–	0	.333	31	–	24	–	0	.564
Ole Miss ‍‍‍^{y}	7	–	17	–	0	.292	31	–	27	–	0	.534
† – Conference champion ‡ – Tournament champion y – Invited to the NCAA tournament As of June 2, 2024; Rankings from NFCA/USA Today

The 2024 South Carolina Gamecocks softball team represented the University of South Carolina in the 2024 NCAA Division I softball season. The Gamecocks play their home games at Carolina Softball Stadium at Beckham Field.

== Previous season ==
The Gamecocks finished the 2023 Season 40–22 overall, and 9–15 in the SEC to finish in tenth place in the conference. They were invited to the Tallahassee Regional where they finished 3–2.

== Roster ==
2024 South Carolina Gamecocks softball team
Players
Coaches

#	Pos.	Name	Bats/throws	Height	Year	High school/junior college	Home town
1	OF	Aniyah Black	R/R	5 ft 7 in (1.7 m)	Sr	Dodge County; Georgia	Chauncey, GA
2	INF	Denver Bryant	R/R	5 ft 6 in (1.68 m)	Sr	Dougherty; Auburn	Albany, Ga
4	INF	Brooke Blankenship	R/R	5 ft 5 in (1.65 m)	Jr	River Ridge	Hudson, FL
5	OF	Carlie Henderson	L/R	5 ft 6 in (1.68 m)	RS Jr	Calhoun	Calhoun, GA
7		Giulia Desiderio	R/R	5 ft 5 in (1.65 m)	Jr	River Ridge	Hudson, FL
8	OF	Kyye Ricks	L/R	5 ft 2 in (1.57 m)	So	Whitewater	Fayetteville, GA
9	RHP	Reganne Bennett	R/R	5 ft 10 in (1.78 m)	Fr	Novi	Novi, MI
10	RHP	Bailey Betenbaugh	R/R	5 ft 8 in (1.73 m)	Sr	Union County	Union, SC
12	OF	Marissa Gonzalez	R/R	5 ft 7 in (1.7 m)	Jr	Kingsburg	Kingsburg, CA
13	INF	Zoe Laneaux	L/R	5 ft 7 in (1.7 m)	Sr	Pope	Marietta, GA
15	RHP	Alana Vawter	R/R	6 ft 0 in (1.83 m)	Sr	Staley; Stanford	Kansas City, MO
16	RHP	Sage Mardjetko	R/R	5 ft 10 in (1.78 m)	Fr	Lemont	Lemont, IL
18	INF	Reagan Marchant	R/R	5 ft 10 in (1.78 m)	RS Fr	Hilton Head Island	Hilton Head Island, SC
19		Jen Cummings	L/R	5 ft 8 in (1.73 m)	Sr	Redmond; Washington	Redmond, WA
21	INF	Natalie Heath	R/R	5 ft 8 in (1.73 m)	RS So	Northgate	Sharpsburg, GA
24	OF	Bre Warren	L/R	5 ft 11 in (1.8 m)	RS Jr	College Station; Texas A&M	College Station, TX
25	RHP	Jori Heard	R/R	5 ft 11 in (1.8 m)	So	Huntley	Algonquin, IL
26	OF	Riley Blampied	R/R	5 ft 8 in (1.73 m)	Sr	Crisp County	Cordele, GA
27		Kianna Jones	R/R	6 ft 0 in (1.83 m)	RS Sr	Burnsview; North Carolina	Surrey, British Columbia
30		Sophia Grillo	R/R	5 ft 5 in (1.65 m)	Fr	Owen J. Roberts	Pottstown, PA
33	INF	Karley Shelton	L/R	5 ft 5 in (1.65 m)	Fr	Lexington	Lexington, SC
44	INF	Emma Sellers	R/R	5 ft 9 in (1.75 m)	Jr	Los Alamitos	Lakewood, CA
89	INF	Kiki Estrada	L/R	5 ft 9 in (1.75 m)	So	Orange Lutheran; Arkansas	Chino Hills, CA

Head coach

Beverly Smith

Assistant coach(es)

Jake Epstein
Katie Repole
Kevin Maguire

Legend

- (C) Team captain
- (S) Suspended
- (I) Ineligible
- Injured
- Current redshirt

Roster

== Record vs. conference opponents ==
Date m/dd is for last scheduled game of series. Blank are not scheduled. Blue are home games, otherwise away.

2024 SEC softball records Source: 2024 SEC softball game results, 2024 SEC softball schedule
Team	W–L	ALA	ARK	AUB	FLA	UGA	KEN	LSU	MSU	MIZZ	MISS	SCAR	TENN	TAMU	Team	SR	SW
ALA	10–14		1–2	1–2	1–2	1–2	1–2	.	.	.	3–0	.	1–2	1–2	ALA	1–7	1–0
ARK	14–10	2–1		2–1	.	2–1	.	2–1	1–2	2–1	1–2	2–1	.	.	ARK	6–2	0–0
AUB	9–15	2–1	1–2		.	.	1–2	2–1	.	1–2	1–2	.	1–2	0–3	AUB	2–6	0–1
FLA	17–7	2–1	.	.		2–1	3–0	2–1	2–1	1–2	.	2–1	.	3–0	FLA	7–1	2–0
UGA	12–12	2–1	1–2	.	1–2		1–2	.	1–2	2–1	3–0	.	1–2	.	UGA	3–5	1–0
KEN	8–16	2–1	.	2–1	0–3	2–1		0–3	.	.	.	1–2	0–3	1–2	KEN	3–5	0–3
LSU	12–12	.	1–2	1–2	1–2	.	3–0		.	1–2	1–2	.	1–2	3–0	LSU	2–6	2–0
MSU	12–12	.	2–1	.	1–2	2–1	.	.		1–2	2–1	2–1	1–2	1–2	MSU	4–4	0–0
MIZZ	13–11	.	1–2	2–1	2–1	1–2	.	2–1	2–1		.	3–0	0–3	.	MIZZ	5–3	1–1
MISS	7–17	0–3	2–1	2–1	.	0–3	.	2–1	1–2	.		0–3	.	0–3	MISS	3–5	0–4
SCAR	8–16	.	1–2	.	1–2	.	2–1	.	1–2	0–3	3–0		0–3	0–3	SCAR	2–6	1–3
TENN	19–5	2–1	.	2–1	.	2–1	3–0	2–1	2–1	3–0	.	3–0		.	TENN	8–0	3–0
TAMU	15–9	2–1	.	3–0	0–3	.	2–1	0–3	2–1	.	3–0	3–0	.		TAMU	6–2	3–2
Team	W–L	ALA	ARK	AUB	FLA	UGA	KEN	LSU	MSU	MIZZ	MISS	SCAR	TENN	TAMU	Team	SR	SW

Updated for entire regular season. Tie brkrs: MSU>UGA & MSU>LSU ARK common. UGA>LSU MIZZ common. SCAR>KEN head to head.

== See also ==
- 2024 South Carolina Gamecocks baseball team
