= 2024 NCAA Division I softball rankings =

2024 NCAA Division I softball season
- Preseason No. 1: Oklahoma
- Defending Champions: Oklahoma
- TV partner/s: ESPN

NCAA Tournament
- Duration: May 17 – June 6, 2024
- Most conference bids: SEC – 13 bids

Women's College World Series
- Duration: May 30 – June 6, 2024
- Champions: Oklahoma (8th title)
- Runners-up: Texas (2nd WCWS Appearance)
- Winning Coach: Patty Gasso (8th title)
- WCWS MOP: Kelly Maxwell (Oklahoma)

Seasons
- ← 2023 2025 →

The following human polls made up the 2024 NCAA Division I women's softball rankings. The NFCA/USA Today Poll was voted on by a panel of 32 Division I softball coaches. The NFCA/USA Today poll, the Softball America poll, the ESPN.com/USA Softball Collegiate rankings, and D1Softball rank the top 25 teams nationally.

== Legend ==
	Increase in ranking
	Decrease in ranking
	Not ranked previous week
Italics	Number of first place votes
(#-#)	Win-loss record
т	Tied with team above or below also with this symbol

== NFCA/USA Today ==
	Preseason Jan 30	Week 1 Feb 13	Week 2 Feb 20	Week 3 Feb 27	Week 4 Mar 5	Week 5 Mar 12	Week 6 Mar 19	Week 7 Mar 26	Week 8 Apr 2	Week 9 Apr 9	Week 10 Apr 15	Week 11 Apr 23	Week 12 Apr 30	Week 13 May 7	Week 14 May 14	Final June 11	
1.	Oklahoma (32)	Oklahoma (4–0) (32)	Oklahoma (9–0) (32)	Oklahoma (14–0) (32)	Oklahoma (18–1) (24)	Oklahoma (22–1) (23)	Oklahoma (27–1) (26)	Oklahoma (31–1) (32)	Oklahoma (34–1) (32)	Oklahoma (35–3) (12)	Texas (35–6) (24)	Texas (38–6) (28)	Texas (42–6) (30)	Texas (45–6) (32)	Texas (47–7) (24)	Oklahoma (59–7) (32)	1.
2.	Tennessee	Tennessee (3–0)	Texas (7–0)	Texas (12–1)	Texas (17–1) (6)	LSU (22–0) (8)	LSU (24–1) (6)	Texas (28–3)	Duke (29–3)	Texas (31–6) (9)	Oklahoma (38–4) (8)	Oklahoma (42–4)	Oklahoma (45–4) (2)	Tennessee (40–9)	Oklahoma (49–6) (8)	Texas (55–10)	2.
3.	Florida Stateт	Texas (5–0)	Georgia (9–0)	Oklahoma State (13–2)	LSU (19–0) (2)	Texas (21–2) (1)	Texas (24–3)	Georgia (27–4)	Georgia (29–5)	Duke (33–3) (10)	Duke (37–4)	Tennessee (34–8)	Tennessee (37–9)	Oklahoma State (44–9)	Tennessee (40–10)	Florida (54–15)	3.
4.	Stanfordт	Georgia (5–0)	Washington (6–1)	LSU (13–0)	Oklahoma State (17–2)	Oklahoma State (20–3)	Oklahoma State (24–3)	Tennessee (25–4)	Texas (29–5)	Tennessee (30–6)	Tennessee (32–7)	Oklahoma State (39–8)	Oklahoma State (42–8)	Oklahoma (46–6)	Duke (46–6)	Stanford (50–17)	4.
5.	Clemson	Washington (3–1)	Tennessee (4–2)	Georgia (12–1)	Washington (16–2)	Georgia (20–3)	Georgia (23–4)	Duke (26–3)	LSU (29–4)	Oklahoma State (33–6) (1)	Stanford (34–7)	Duke (39–6)	Duke (44–6)	Duke (44–6)	Oklahoma State (44–10)	ULCA (43–12)	5.
6.	Georgia	Oklahoma State (5–0)	LSU (8–0)	Washington (12–2)	Duke (16–1)	Duke (19–1)	Duke (22–2)	LSU (25–4)	Tennessee (28–5)	LSU (31–5)	Oklahoma State (35–8)	LSU (35–10)	Stanford (39–11)	UCLA (34–10)	UCLA (37–10)	Oklahoma State (49–12)	6.
7.	Washington	Florida State (4–1)	Oklahoma State (6–2)	Duke (13–1)	Georgia (15–3)	Washington (18–3)	Tennessee (22–4)	Stanford (25–5)	Oklahoma State (29–6)	Georgia (31–8)	LSU (33–7)	Stanford (36–10)	UCLA (30–10)	Stanford (42–12)	Florida (46–12)	Duke (52–9)	7.
8.	Texas	Clemson (4–1)	Duke (8–1)	Clemson (11–2)	Tennessee (12–4)	Tennessee (18–4)	Washington (20–4)	Oklahoma State (26–5)	Stanford (27–6)	Stanford (31–6)	Washington (28–7)	Washington (30–8)	Texas A&M (39–9)	Florida (43–12)	Stanford (43–13)	Alabama (39–20)	8.
9.	Oklahoma State	Stanford (3–2)	Clemson (6–2)	Tennessee (8–4)	Stanford (13–4)	Stanford (18–4)	Stanford (22–5)	Washington (22–5)	Washington (25–5)	Florida (33–6)	Georgia (33–10)	UCLA (27–9)	Washington (31–10)	Texas A&M (39–12)	Texas A&M (40–13)	Tennessee (44–12)	9.
10.	UCLA	Duke (3–1)	Alabama (10–0)	Alabama (16–0)	Clemson (12–4)	Florida (21–3)	Florida (25–4)	Florida (29–4)	Florida (31–5)	Washington (26–7)	Florida (35–9)	Texas A&M (37–9)	LSU (36–13)	LSU (38–14)	Missouri (43–15)	Texas A&M (44–15)	10.
11.	Duke	Alabama (5–0)	Missouri (10–0)	Stanford (10–4)	Alabama (19–1)	Missouri (20–3)	Clemson (21–6)	Texas A&M (28–4)	Missouri (29–7)	Texas A&M (31–8)	Texas A&M (32–9)	Georgia (36–11)	Florida (39–12)	Missouri (40–14)	LSU (40–15)	Missouri (48–18)	11.
12.	Alabama	LSU (5–0)	Florida State (5–3)	Florida State (11–3)	Missouri (17–2)	Clemson (17–6)	Texas A&M (25–3)	Missouri (25–7)	UCLA (20–8)	Alabama (29–8)т	UCLA (24–9)	Florida (37–10)	Florida State (40–10)	Washington (31–12)	Florida State (43–14)	LSU (44–17)	12.
13.	Utah	Utah (4–1)	Stanford (5–4)	Florida (15–2)	Florida (19–2)	Texas A&M (23–2)	Alabama (22–5)	Alabama (25–6)	Texas A&M (28–7)	UCLA (22–9)т	Missouri (33–11)	Virginia Tech (35–9–1)	Missouri (37–13)	Florida State (41–13)	Washington (31–13)	Florida State (46–16)	13.
14.	LSU	Missouri (5–0)	Florida (8–1)	Missouri (13–2)	Florida State (11–4)	Alabama (19–3)	UCLA (17–6)	UCLA (18–8)	Alabama (26–8)	Missouri (30–10)	Alabama (30–9)	Missouri (35–13)	Georgia (37–13)	Georgia (38–15)	Georgia (39–16)	Georgia (43–19)	14.
15.	Oregon	Arkansas (4–1)	Arkansas (8–2)	Arkansas (13–3)	California (19–2)	UCLA (14–6)	Missouri (22–6)	Virginia Tech (25–5–1)	Virginia Tech (25–8–1)	Virginia Tech (28–9–1)	Virginia Tech (31–9–1)	Arkansas (32–12)	Arkansas (34–13)	Virginia Tech (38–11–1)	Virginia Tech (38–12–1)	Arizona (37–18–1)	15.
16.	Arkansas	Florida (4–1)	Kentucky (6–2)	Kentucky (11–2)	UCLA (11–6)	Florida State (15–5)	Virginia Tech (21–4–1)	Clemson (22–9)	Mississippi State (25–9)	Mississippi State (28–10)	Arkansas (30–11)	Florida State (36–10)	Virginia Tech (38–11–1)	Arkansas (36–15)	Arkansas (36–16)	Washington (32–15)	16.
17.	Florida	Oregon (4–2)	South Carolina (8–1)	Texas A&M (14–1)	Texas A&M (19–2)	California (21–4)	Florida State (18–8)	Mississippi State (24–7)	Clemson (24–10)	Arkansas (28–10)	Mississippi State (29–12)	Alabama (31–12)	Alabama (32–14)	Mississippi State (33–17)	Arizona (34–16–1)	Virginia Tech (40–14–1)	17.
18.	Nebraska	Kentucky (4–1)	Texas A&M (9–0)	UCLA (7–5)	Arkansas (17–4)	Virginia Tech (18–3–1)	Arkansas (22–6)	California (24–8)	Florida State (24–9)	Florida State (28–10)	Florida State (31–10)	Mississippi State (30–13)	Arizona (32–15–1)	Arizona (33–15–1)	Mississippi State (33–18)	Arkansas (37–18)	18.
19.	Auburn	UCLA (2–3)	UCLA (3–4)	Arizona (16–1)	Baylor (11–3)	Baylor (14–5)	California (21–7)	Florida State (21–9)	Arkansas (22–11–1)	Clemson (27–11)	Arizona (28–13–1)	Arizona (31–13–1)	California (33–15)	California (36–16)	Alabama (33–17)	Louisiana (45–19)	19.
20.	Northwestern	South Carolina (5–0)	Utah (5–4)	California (15–1)	Virginia Tech (15–3–1)	Arkansas (20–5)	Mississippi State (21–6)	Arkansas (24–8)	California (26–10)	California (29–11)	California (29–12)	California (31–14)	Mississippi State (30–16)	Alabama (33–16)	Louisiana (42–17)	Baylor (36–23)	20.
21.	Louisiana	Virginia Tech (4–0–1)	California (10–1)	Baylor (8–3)	Arizona (17–3–1)	Mississippi State (19–4)	Arizona (20–7–1)	Arizona (21–9–1)	Arizona (22–11–1)	Arizona (24–12–1)	Clemson (28–14)	Kentucky (29–15)	Louisiana (38–14)	Louisiana (40–16)	California (36–17)	Mississippi State (34–20)	21.
22.	Baylor	Northwestern (4–1)	Arizona (10–1)	South Carolina (13–1)	South Carolina (18–2)	Arizona (19–5–1)	Baylor (16–8)	South Carolina (22–9)	South Carolina (26–10)	Oregon (22–13)	Oregon (24–15)	Clemson (31–15)	Boston University (45–4–1)	Boston University (49–4–1)	Boston University (52–4–1)	Texas State (47–15)	22.
23.	South Carolina	Louisiana (4–1)	Oregon (6–5)	Virginia Tech (12–3–1)	Kentucky (13–4)	South Carolina (18–5)	South Carolina (21–7)	Baylor (17–11)	Boston University (27–3)	South Carolina (28–12)	Boston University (35–4)	Boston University (40–4)	Clemson (33–16)	Clemson (33–16)	Clemson (34–17)	Boston University (53–6–1)	23.
24.	San Diego State	Baylor (0–2)	Northwestern (5–2)	Mississippi State (11–3)	Mississippi State (17–3)	Boston University (17–1)	Boston University (20–3)	Oregon (19–10)	Oregon (20–12)	Boston University (29–4)	Kentucky (26–15)	Oregon (26–16)	Kentucky (30–18)	Oregon (28–18)	Miami (OH) (48–7)	Oregon (30–21)	24.
25.	Kentucky	Auburn (1–1–1)	Mississippi State (8–1)	Oregon (9–7)	Auburn (12–2–1)	Auburn (13–4–1)	Auburn (14–6–1)	Boston University (25–3)	Baylor (19–12)	Texas State (32–9)	Louisiana (29–14)	Louisiana (33–15)	Oregon (27–16)	Northwestern (33–10)	Texas State (45–13)	California (37–19)	25.
	Preseason Jan 30	Week 1 Feb 13	Week 2 Feb 20	Week 3 Feb 27	Week 4 Mar 5	Week 5 Mar 12	Week 6 Mar 19	Week 7 Mar 26	Week 8 Apr 2	Week 9 Apr 9	Week 10 Apr 15	Week 11 Apr 23	Week 12 Apr 30	Week 13 May 7	Week 14 May 14	Final June 11	
		Dropped: No. 18 Nebraska; No. 24 San Diego State	Dropped: No. 21 Virginia Tech; No. 23 Louisiana; No. 24 Baylor; No. 25 Auburn	Dropped: No. 20 Utah; No. 24 Northwestern	Dropped: No. 25 Oregon	Dropped: No. 23 Kentucky	None	Dropped: No. 25 Auburn	None	Dropped: No. 25 Baylor	Dropped: No. 23 South Carolina; No. 25 Texas State	None	None	Dropped: No. 24 Kentucky	Dropped: No. 24 Oregon; No. 25 Northwestern	Dropped: No. 23 Clemson; No. 24 Miami (OH)	

== ESPN.com/USA Softball Collegiate Top 25 ==
	Preseason Jan 23	Week 1 Feb 13	Week 2 Feb 20	Week 3 Feb 27	Week 4 Mar 5	Week 5 Mar 12	Week 6 Mar 19	Week 7 Mar 26	Week 8 Apr 2	Week 9 Apr 9	Week 10 Apr 16	Week 11 Apr 23	Week 12 Apr 30	Week 13 May 7	Week 14 May 14	Final June 11	
1.	Oklahoma	Oklahoma (4–0) (25)	Oklahoma (9–0) (21)	Oklahoma (14–0) (25)	Texas (17–1) (11)	Oklahoma (22–1) (19)	Oklahoma (27–1) (25)	Oklahoma (31–1) (25)	Oklahoma (34–1) (25)	Texas (31–6) (12)	Texas (35–6) (25)	Texas (38–6) (25)	Texas (42–6) (25)	Texas (45–6) (24)	Texas (47–7) (23)	Oklahoma (59–7) (32)	1.
2.	Tennessee	Tennessee (3–0)	Texas (7–0)	Texas (12–1)	Oklahoma (18–1) (13)	LSU (22–0) (6)	Texas (24–3)	Texas (28–3)	Duke (29–3)	Oklahoma (35–3) (5)	Oklahoma (38–4)	Oklahoma (42–4)	Oklahoma (45–4)	Oklahoma State (44–9) (1)	Oklahoma (49–6) (2)	Texas (55–10)	2.
3.	Stanford	Texas (5–0)	Georgia (9–0)	Georgia (12–1)	LSU (19–0) (1)	Texas (21–2)	LSU (24–1)	Georgia (27–4)	Georgia (29–5)	Duke (33–3) (6)	Duke (37–4)	Tennessee (34–8)	Tennessee (37–9)	Tennessee (40–9)	Tennessee (40–10)	Florida (54–15)	3.
4.	Florida State	Georgia (5–0)	Washington (6–1)	Washington (12–2)	Duke (16–1)	Duke (19–1)	Duke (22–2)	Tennessee (25–4)	Tennessee (28–5)	Tennessee (30–6) (1)	Tennessee (32–7)	Oklahoma State (39–8)	Oklahoma State (42–8)	Oklahoma (46–6)	Oklahoma State (44–10)	Stanford (50–17)	4.
5.	Texas	Florida State (4–1)	Tennessee (4–2)	LSU (13–0)	Washington (16–2)	Georgia (20–3)	Georgia (23–4)	Duke (26–3)	Texas (29–5)	Oklahoma State (33–6) (1)	Stanford (34–7)	Duke (39–6)	Duke (44–6)	Duke (44–6)	Florida (46–12)	UCLA (43–12)	5.
6.	Georgia	Washington (3–1)	Duke (8–1)	Duke (13–1)т	Georgia (15–3)	Stanford (18–4)	Oklahoma State (24–3)	Stanford (25–5)	Oklahoma State (29–6)	LSU (31–5)	Oklahoma State (35–8)	UCLA (27–9)	UCLA (30–10)	UCLA (34–10)	UCLA (37–10)	Alabama (39–20)	6.
7.	Clemson	Clemson (4–1)	LSU (8–0)	Oklahoma State (13–2)т	Oklahoma State (17–2)	Oklahoma State (20–3)	Tennessee (22–4)	LSU (25–4)	LSU (29–4)	Stanford (31–6)	LSU (33–8)	LSU (35–10)	Stanford (39–11)	Florida (43–12)	Duke (47–6)	Oklahoma State (49–12)	7.
8.	UCLA	Oklahoma State (5–0)	Oklahoma State (6–2)	Tennessee (8–4)	Stanford (13–4)	Washington (18–3)	Stanford (22–5)	Washington (22–5)	Stanford (27–6)	Georgia (31–8)	Washington (28–7)	Stanford (36–10)	Texas A&M (39–9)	Stanford (42–12)	Stanford (43–13)	Duke (52–9)	8.
9.	Duke	Stanford (3–2)	Clemson (6–2)	Clemson (11–2)	Tennessee (12–4)	Tennessee (18–4)	Washington (20–4)	Florida (29–4)	Washington (25–5)	Florida (33–6)	Georgia (33–10)	Georgia (36–11)	Florida (39–12)	LSU (38–14)	Missouri (43–15)	Tennessee (44–12)	9.
10.	Washington	Duke (3–1)	Alabama (10–0)	Stanford (10–4)	Alabama (19–1)	Florida (21–3)	Florida (25–4)	Oklahoma State (26–5)	Florida (31–5)	Washington (26–7)	Florida (36–9)	Washington (30–8)	Washington (31–10)	Texas A&M (39–12)	LSU (40–15)	Texas A&M (44–15)	10.
11.	Oklahoma State	Alabama (5–0)	Florida State (5–3)	Alabama (16–0)	Clemson (13–4)	Missouri (20–3)	Clemson (21–6)	Virginia Tech (25–5–1)	Missouri (29–7)	UCLA (22–9)	UCLA (24–9)	Texas A&M (37–9)	Arkansas (34–13)	Washington (31–12)	Arkansas (43–16)	LSU (44–17)	11.
12.	Arkansas	LSU (5–0)	Stanford (5–4)	Florida State (11–3)	Missouri (17–2)	Virginia Tech (18–3–1)	Virginia Tech (21–4–1)	Texas A&M (28–4)	UCLA (20–8)	Texas A&M (31–8)	Texas A&M (32–9)	Florida (37–10)	Georgia (37–13)	Missouri (40–14)	Texas A&M (40–13)	Missouri (48–18)	12.
13.	Oregon	Arkansas (4–1)	Missouri (10–0)	Missouri (13–2)	Florida (19–3)	Baylor (14–5)	UCLA (17–6)	Missouri (25–7)	Virginia Tech (25–8–1)	Alabama (29–8)	Missouri (33–11)	Arkansas (32–12)	LSU (36–13)	Arkansas (36–15)	Georgia (39–16)	Georgia (43–19)	13.
14.	Alabama	Oregon (4–2)	Arkansas (8–2)	Kentucky (11–2)	Baylor (11–3)	Clemson (17–6)	Texas A&M (25–3)	Alabama (25–6)	Texas A&M (28–7)	Arkansas (28–10)	Arkansas (30–11)	Missouri (35–13)	Florida State (40–10)	Georgia (38–15)	Florida State (43–14)	Florida State (46–16)	14.
15.	LSU	Missouri (5–0)	Kentucky (6–2)	Florida (15–2)	Virginia Tech (15–3–1)	Alabama (19–3)	Alabama (22–5)	UCLA (18–8)	Alabama (26–8)	Missouri (30–10)	Alabama (30–9)	Virginia Tech (35–9–1)	Missouri (37–13)	Virginia Tech (39–11–1)	Washington (31–13)	Arizona (37–18–1)	15.
16.	Utah	Utah (4–1)	Florida (8–1)	Arkansas (13–3)	Florida State (11–4)	UCLA (14–6)	Missouri (22–6)	Clemson (22–9)	Mississippi State (25–9)	Virginia Tech (28–9–1)	Virginia Tech (31–9–1)	Florida State (36–10)	Alabama (32–14)	Florida State (41–13)	Louisiana (42–17)	Baylor (36–23)	16.
17.	Nebraska	Virginia Tech (4–0–1)	Texas A&M (9–0)	Baylor (8–3)	California (19–2)	Texas A&M (23–2)	Arkansas (22–6)	Mississippi State (24–7)	Clemson (23–10)	Mississippi State (28–10)	Mississippi State (29–12)	Alabama (31–12)	Louisiana (38–15)	Mississippi State (33–17)	Virginia Tech (39–12–1)	Arkansas (37–18)	17.
18.	Florida	Kentucky (4–1)	South Carolina (8–1)	Texas A&M (14–1)	UCLA (11–6)	Florida State (15–5)	Florida State (18–8)	Florida State (21–9)	Florida State (24–9)	Florida State (28–10)	Florida State (31–10)	Mississippi State (30–13)	Virginia Tech (38–11–1)	Louisiana (40–16)	Alabama (33–17)	Virginia Tech (40–14–1)	18.
19.	Baylor	Florida (4–1)	UCLA (3–4)	UCLA (7–5)	Texas A&M (19–2)	California (21–4)	Baylor (16–8)	California (24–8)	Arkansas (25–9)	Clemson (27–11)	Louisiana (29–14)	Louisiana (33–15)	Mississippi State (30–16)	Arizona (33–15–1)	Arizona (34–16–1)	Louisiana (45–19)	19.
20.	Auburn	UCLA (2–3)	Mississippi State (8–1)	Virginia Tech (12–3–1)	Arkansas (18–4)	Arkansas (20–5)	Mississippi State (21–6)	Arkansas (24–8)	California (26–10)	Oregon (22–13)	Clemson (28–13)т	Arizona (31–13–1)	Arizona (32–15–1)	Alabama (33–16)	Mississippi State (33–18)	Oregon (30–21)	20.
21.	Louisiana	South Carolina (5–0)	Virginia Tech (7–2–1)	Arizona (16–1)	Kentucky (13–4)	Mississippi State (19–4)	California (21–7)	Baylor (17–11)т	Baylor (19–12)	Louisiana (27–13)	Oregon (24–15)т	Clemson (31–15)	Oregon (27–16)	Clemson (33–16)	Clemson (34–17)	Washington (32–15)	21.
22.	South Carolina	Baylor (0–2)	Baylor (3–3)	South Carolina (13–2)	South Carolina (18–2)	South Carolina (18–5)	Oregon (16–10)	Oregon (19–10)т	Oregon (20–12)	Texas State (32–9)	Arizona (28–13–1)	Kentucky (29–15)	Clemson (33–16)	Oregon (28–18)	Oregon (28–19)	Mississippi State (34–20)	22.
23.	Virginia Tech	Louisiana (4–1)	Arizona (10–1)	Mississippi State (11–3)	Mississippi State (17–3)	Kentucky (14–7)	Kentucky (19–8)	Texas State (26–7)	Texas State (29–8)	California (29–11)	Kentucky (26–15)	Oregon (26–16)	Northwestern (31–9)	Northwestern (33–10)	Miami (OH) (48–7)	Northwestern (35–13)	23.
24.	Texas A&M	Auburn (1–1–1)	Auburn (4–1–1)	California (15–1)	Arizona (17–3–1)	Oregon (14–9)	Arizona (20–7–1)	Kansas (22–8–1)	Louisiana (24–13)	Baylor (21–14)	California (29–12)	Texas State (37–12)	Kentucky (30–18)	Miami (OH) (45–7)	Texas State (45–13)	Clemson (35–19)	24.
25.	Northwestern	Texas A&M (4–0)	Oregon (6–5)	Auburn (7–2–1)	Auburn (12–2–1)	Arizona (19–5–1)	South Carolina (21–7)	Louisiana (21–13)	South Carolina (26–10)	Arizona (24–12–1)т; South Carolina (28–12)т	Texas State (33–12)	California (31–14)	Miami (OH) (40–7)	Kentucky (30–21)	Northwestern (33–11)	Texas State (47–15)	25.
	Preseason Jan 23	Week 1 Feb 13	Week 2 Feb 20	Week 3 Feb 27	Week 4 Mar 5	Week 5 Mar 12	Week 6 Mar 19	Week 7 Mar 26	Week 8 Apr 2	Week 9 Apr 9	Week 10 Apr 16	Week 11 Apr 23	Week 12 Apr 30	Week 13 May 7	Week 14 May 14	Final June 11	
		Dropped: No. 17 Nebraska; No. 25 Northwestern	Dropped: No. 16 Utah; No. 23 Louisiana	Dropped: No. 25 Oregon	None	Dropped: No. 25 Auburn	None	Dropped: No. 23 Kentucky; No. 24 Arizona; No. 25 South Carolina	Dropped: No. 24 Kansas	None	Dropped: No. 24 Baylor; No. 25т South Carolina	None	Dropped: No. 24 Texas State; No. 25 California	None	Dropped: No. 25 Kentucky	Dropped: No. 23 Miami (OH)	

== D1Softball ==
	Preseason Jan 16	Week 1 Feb 12	Week 2 Feb 19	Week 3 Feb 26	Week 4 Mar 4	Week 5 Mar 12	Week 6 Mar 19	Week 7 Mar 26	Week 8 Apr 2	Week 9 Apr 9	Week 10 Apr 16	Week 11 Apr 23	Week 12 Apr 30	Week 13 May 6	Final Jun 12	
1.	Oklahoma	Oklahoma (4–0)	Oklahoma (9–0)	Oklahoma (14–0)	Texas (17–1)	Oklahoma (22–1)	Oklahoma (27–1)	Oklahoma (31–1)	Oklahoma (34–1)	Texas (31–6)	Texas (35–6)	Texas (38–6)	Texas (42–6)	Texas (45–6)	Oklahoma (59–7)	1.
2.	Stanford	Texas (5–0)	Texas (7–0)	Texas (12–1)	Oklahoma (18–1)	LSU (22–0)	Texas (24–3)	Texas (28–3)	Stanford (27–6)	Oklahoma (35–3)	Oklahoma (38–4)	Oklahoma (42–4)	Oklahoma (45–4)	Tennessee (40–9)	Texas (55–10)	2.
3.	Tennessee	Tennessee (3–0)	Georgia (9–0)	LSU (13–0)	LSU (19–0)	Texas (21–2)	Oklahoma State (24–3)	Stanford (25–5)	Oklahoma State (29–6)	Stanford (31–6)	Stanford (34–7)	Tennessee (34–8)	Tennessee (37–9)	Oklahoma State (44–9)	Florida (54–15)	3.
4.	Florida State	Oklahoma State (5–0)	Washington (6–1)	Georgia (12–1)	Oklahoma State (17–2)	Oklahoma State (20–3)	Stanford (22–5)	Georgia (27–4)	Texas (29–5)	Oklahoma State (33–6)	Duke (37–4)	Oklahoma State (39–8)	Oklahoma State (42–8)	Oklahoma (46–6)	Stanford (50–17)	4.
5.	Texas	Georgia (5–0)	Tennessee (4–2)	Duke (12–1)	Duke (15–1)	Stanford (18–4)	LSU (24–1)	Tennessee (26–4)	Duke (29–3)	Duke (33–3)	Tennessee (32–7)	UCLA (27–9)	Stanford (40–11)	UCLA (34–10)	UCLA (43–12)	5.
6.	Georgia	Washington (3–1)	LSU (8–0)	Oklahoma State (13–2)	Stanford (13–4)	Duke (19–1)	Duke (22–2)	Duke (26–3)	LSU (29–4)	Tennessee (30–6)	Washington (28–7)	Stanford (36–10)	UCLA (30–10)	Stanford (42–12)	Oklahoma State (49–12)	6.
7.	Clemson	Duke (3–1)	Duke (7–1)	Stanford (10–4)	Washington (16–2)	Georgia (20–3)	Georgia (23–4)	Washington (22–5)	Tennessee (28–5)	Florida (34–6)	Oklahoma State (35–8)	Duke (39–6)	Duke (44–6)	Duke (44–6)	Duke (52–9)	7.
8.	Duke	Florida State (4–1)	Oklahoma State (6–2)	Washington (12–2)	Georgia (15–3)	Washington (18–3)	Tennessee (22–4)	LSU (25–4)	Washington (25–5)	LSU (31–6)	LSU (33–8)	LSU (35–10)	Arkansas (34–13)	Florida (43–12)	Alabama (39–20)	8.
9.	UCLA	LSU (5–0)	Stanford (5–4)	Tennessee (8–4)	Tennessee (12–4)	Tennessee (19–4)	Washington (20–4)	Oklahoma State (26–5)	Georgia (29–6)	Georgia (31–8)	Florida (35–9)	Texas A&M (37–9)	Washington (31–10)	Arkansas (36–15)	Tennessee (44–12)	9.
10.	Washington	Clemson (4–1)	Clemson (6–2)	Baylor (8–3)	Baylor (11–3)	Baylor (14–5)	Florida (25–4)	Florida (29–4)	Florida (31–5)	Washington (27–7)	Missouri (33–11)	Georgia (36–11)	Texas A&M (39–9)	Missouri (40–14)	LSU (44–17)	10.
11.	Alabama	Missouri (5–0)	Missouri (10–0)т	Clemson (11–2)	Clemson (13–4)	Florida (21–4)	Clemson (21–6)	Texas A&M (28–4)	Missouri (29–7)	Arkansas (28–10)	Texas A&M (33–9)	Washington (30–8)	Florida State (40–10)	Texas A&M (39–12)	Texas A&M (44–15)	11.
12.	Oklahoma State	Alabama (5–0)	Alabama (10–0)т	Alabama (16–0)	Alabama (19–1)	Missouri (20–3)	Texas A&M (25–3)	Virginia Tech (25–5–1)	UCLA (20–8)	UCLA (22–9)	UCLA (24–9)	Arkansas (32–12)	Florida (39–12)	LSU (38–14)	Baylor (36–23)	12.
13.	Nebraska	Stanford (3–2)	Kentucky (6–2)	Florida State (11–3)	Missouri (17–2)	Clemson (17–6)	Virginia Tech (21–4–1)	Missouri (25–7)	Virginia Tech (25–8–1)	Texas A&M (31–8)	Arkansas (30–11)	Florida (37–10)	LSU (36–13)	Georgia (38–15)	Missouri (48–18)	13.
14.	Oregonт	Kentucky (4–1)	Florida State (5–3)	Kentucky (11–2)	Florida (19–3)	Virginia Tech (18–3–1)	UCLA (17–6)	UCLA (18–8)	Arkansas (26–9)	Virginia Tech (28–9–1)	Georgia (33–10)	Missouri (35–13)	Georgia (37–13)	Washington (31–12)	Florida State (46–16)	14.
15.	Utahт	Utah (4–1)	Arkansas (8–2)	Missouri (13–2)	Virginia Tech (15–3–1)	Alabama (20–3)	Alabama (22–5)	Clemson (22–9)	Clemson (24–10)	Mississippi State (28–10)	Virginia Tech (31–9–1)	Virginia Tech (35–9–1)	Missouri (37–14)	Mississippi State (33–17)	Georgia (43–19)	15.
16.	Baylor	Virginia Tech (4–0–1)	Texas A&M (9–0)	Arkansas (13–3)	Florida State (11–4)	UCLA (14–6)	Missouri (22–6)	Mississippi State (24–7)	Mississippi State (25–9)	Missouri (30–10)	Florida State (31–10)	Florida State (36–10)	Arizona (32–15–1)	Arizona (33–15–1)	Arizona (37–18–1)	16.
17.	LSU	Baylor (0–2)	Arizona (10–1)	Arizona (16–1)	Mississippi State (17–3)	Texas A&M (23–2)	Arkansas (22–6)	Alabama (25–6)	Texas A&M (28–7)	Alabama (29–8)	Mississippi State (29–12)	Mississippi State (30–13)	Louisiana (38–15)	Louisiana (40–16)	Washington (32–15)	17.
18.	Arkansas	Arkansas (4–1)	South Carolina (8–1)	Florida (15–2)т	UCLA (11–6)	Mississippi State (19–4)	Mississippi State (21–6)	California (24–8)	Alabama (26–8)	Florida State (28–10)	Alabama (30–10)	Arizona (31–13–1)	Virginia Tech (38–11–1)	Florida State (41–13)	Louisiana (45–19)	18.
19.	Auburn	Oregon (4–2)	Baylor (3–3)	Virginia Tech (12–3–1)т	California (19–2)	Arkansas (20–5)	Baylor (16–8)	Arkansas (24–8)	Florida State (24–9)	Clemson (27–11)	Arizona (28–13–1)	Alabama (31–12)	Mississippi State (31–16)	Virginia Tech (39–11–1)	Virginia Tech (40–14–1)	19.
20.	Florida	South Carolina (5–0)	Florida (8–1)	UCLA (7–5)	South Carolina (18–2)	Arizona (19–5–1)	Arizona (20–7–1)	Arizona (21–9–1)	Texas State (28–8)	Texas State (31–9)	Louisiana (29–14)	Louisiana (33–15)	Boston University (44–4–1)	Alabama (33–16)	Oregon (30–21)	20.
21.	Louisiana	Indiana (4–1)	Mississippi State (8–1)	Texas A&M (14–1)т	Arizona (17–3–1)	California (21–4)	Charlotte (16–9)	Kansas (22–8–1)	Boston University (27–3)	Boston University (30–4)	Northwestern (26–8)	Northwestern (29–9)	Northwestern (31–9)	Boston University (49–4–1)	Boston University (53–6–1)	21.
22.	South Carolina	UCLA (2–3)	California (10–1)	Mississippi State (11–3)т	Arkansas (17–4)	Boston University (17–1)	California (21–7)	Florida State (21–9)	Arizona (22–11–1)	Northwestern (22–8)	Clemson (28–14)	Boston University (39–4)	Alabama (32–14)	Oregon (28–18)	Arkansas (37–18)	22.
23.	San Diego State	Florida (4–1)	Northwestern (5–2)	South Carolina (13–2)	Texas A&M (19–2)	South Carolina (18–5)	Florida State (18–8)	Texas State (25–7)	California (26–10)	Arizona (24–12–1)	Boston University (35–4)	Kentucky (29–16)	Oregon (27–16)	Northwestern (33–10)	Liberty (38–25)	23.
24.	Northwestern	Northwestern (4–1)	UCLA (3–4)	California (15–1)	Boston University (13–1)	Florida State (15–5)	Boston University (20–3)	Baylor (17–11)	Northwestern (19–8)	Louisiana (27–13)	Kentucky (26–15)	Oregon (26–16)	South Carolina (32–18)	California (36–16)	Northwestern (35–13)	24.
25.	Texas A&M	Texas A&M (4–0)	Boston University (10–0)	Boston University (13–1)	Kentucky (13–4)	Texas State (20–6)	Texas State (22–7)	Boston University (25–3)	Charlotte (20–13)	Oregon (22–13)	Oregon (24–15)	Texas State (37–12)	California (33–15)	Texas State (42–13)	Texas State (47–15)	25.
	Preseason Jan 16	Week 1 Feb 12	Week 2 Feb 19	Week 3 Feb 26	Week 4 Mar 4	Week 5 Mar 12	Week 6 Mar 19	Week 7 Mar 26	Week 8 Apr 2	Week 9 Apr 9	Week 10 Apr 16	Week 11 Apr 23	Week 12 Apr 30	Week 13 May 6	Final Jun 12	
		Dropped: No. 13 Nebraska; No. 19 Auburn; No. 21 Louisiana; No. 23 San Diego State	Dropped: No. 15 Utah; No. 16 Virginia Tech; No. 19 Oregon; No. 21 Indiana	Dropped: No. 23 Northwestern	None	Dropped: No. 25 Kentucky	Dropped: No. 23 South Carolina	Dropped: No. 21 Charlotte	Dropped: No. 21 Kansas; No. 24 Baylor	Dropped: No. 23 California; No. 25 Charlotte	Dropped: No. 20 Texas State	Dropped: No. 22 Clemson	Dropped: No. 23 Kentucky; No. 25 Texas State	Dropped: No. 24 South Carolina	Dropped: No. 15 Mississippi State; No. 24 California	

== Softball America ==
	Preseason Jan 18	Week 1 Feb 12	Week 2 Feb 19	Week 3 Feb 26	Week 4 Mar 4	Week 5 Mar 11	Week 6 Mar 18	Week 7 Mar 25	Week 8 Apr 1	Week 9 Apr 8	Week 10 Apr 15	Week 11 Apr 22	Week 12 Apr 29	Week 13 May 6	Final Jun 11	
1.	Oklahoma	Oklahoma (4–0)	Oklahoma (9–0)	Oklahoma (14–0)	Oklahoma (18–1)	Oklahoma (22–1)	Oklahoma (27–1)	Oklahoma (31–1)	Oklahoma (34–1)	Duke (33–3)	Texas (35–6)	Texas (38–6)	Texas (42–6)	Texas (45–6)	Oklahoma (59–7)	1.
2.	Tennessee	Texas (5–0)	Texas (7–0)	Texas (12–1)	Texas (17–1)	LSU (22–0)	LSU (24–1)	Texas (28–3)	Duke (29–3)	Oklahoma (35–3)	Oklahoma (38–4)	Oklahoma (42–4)	Oklahoma (45–4)	Tennessee (40–9)	Texas (55–10)	2.
3.	Florida State	Tennessee (3–0)	Georgia (9–0)	Georgia (12–1)	Duke (16–1)	Duke (19–1)	Duke (22–2)	Georgia (27–4)	Georgia (29–5)	Oklahoma State (33–6)	Duke (37–4)	Tennessee (34–8)	Tennessee (37–9)	Oklahoma State (44–9)	Florida (54–15)	3.
4.	Stanford	Georgia (5–0)	Washington (6–1)	Duke (13–1)	LSU (19–0)	Texas (21–2)	Texas (24–3)	Duke (26–3)	Oklahoma State (29–6)	Texas (31–6)	Tennessee (32–7)	Texas A&M (37–9)	Texas A&M (39–9)	Oklahoma (46–6)	Stanford (50–17)	4.
5.	Clemson	Duke (3–1)	Duke (8–1)	LSU (13–0)	Stanford (13–4)	Stanford (18–4)	Georgia (23–4)	Stanford (25–5)	Tennessee (28–5)	Tennessee (30–6)	Stanford (34–7)	Oklahoma State (39–8)	Oklahoma State (42–8)	Duke (44–6)	UCLA (43–12)	5.
6.	Georgia	Clemson (4–1)	LSU (8–0)	Oklahoma State (13–2)	Georgia (15–3)	Georgia (20–3)	Stanford (22–5)	Tennessee (25–4)	Texas (29–5)	Stanford (31–6)	Oklahoma State (35–8)	Duke (39–6)	Duke (44–6)	UCLA (34–10)	Alabama (39–20)	6.
7.	Texas	Florida State (4–1)	Tennessee (4–2)	Stanford (10–4)	Oklahoma State (17–2)	Oklahoma State (20–3)	Oklahoma State (24–3)	Oklahoma State (26–5)	Stanford (27–6)	LSU (31–5)	Texas A&M (32–9)	UCLA (27–9)	UCLA (30–10)	Stanford (42–12)	Oklahoma State (49–12)	7.
8.	Arkansas	Washington (3–1)	Missouri (10–0)	Washington (12–2)	Washington (16–2)	Washington (18–3)	Tennessee (22–4)	Washington (22–5)	LSU (29–4)	Florida (33–6)	Arkansas (30–11)	Arkansas (32–12)	Arkansas (34–13)	Missouri (40–14)	Duke (52–9)	8.
9.	Duke	Stanford (3–2)	Clemson (6–2)	Clemson (11–2)	Alabama (19–1)	Tennessee (18–4)	Washington (20–4)	Florida (29–4)	Washington (25–5)	Georgia (31–8)	Missouri (33–11)	Stanford (36–10)	Stanford (39–11)	Florida (43–12)	Missouri (48–18)	9.
10.	UCLA	Oklahoma State (5–0)	Stanford (5–4)	Alabama (16–0)	Clemson (13–4)	Virginia Tech (18–3–1)	Virginia Tech (21–4–1)	Virginia Tech (25–5–1)	Florida (31–5)	Texas A&M (31–8)	LSU (33–8)	Georgia (36–11)	Missouri (37–13)	Texas A&M (39–12)	Tennessee (44–12)	10.
11.	Baylor	LSU (5–0)	Oklahoma State (6–2)	Tennessee (7–4)	Virginia Tech (15–3–1)	Missouri (20–3)	Florida (25–4)	Texas A&M (28–4)	Missouri (29–7)	Mississippi State (28–10)	Georgia (33–10)	LSU (35–10)	Florida State (40–10)	Arkansas (36–15)	Texas A&M (44–15)	11.
12.	LSU	Arkansas (4–1)	Alabama (10–0)	Baylor (8–3)	Tennessee (12–4)	Florida (21–3)	Texas A&M (25–3)	Missouri (25–7)	UCLA (20–8)	Washington (26–7)	Florida (35–9)	Washington (30–8)	Florida (39–12)	Louisiana (40–16)	LSU (44–17)	12.
13.	Utah	Missouri (5–0)	Texas A&M (9–0)	Missouri (13–2)	Baylor (11–3)	Texas A&M (23–2)	Clemson (21–6)	LSU (25–4)	Virginia Tech (25–8–1)	Arkansas (28–10)	Alabama (30–9)	Missouri (35–13)	Georgia (37–13)	LSU (38–14)	Georgia (43–19)	13.
14.	Oklahoma State	Utah (4–1)	Arkansas (8–2)	Virginia Tech (12–3)	Missouri (17–2)	Baylor (14–5)	UCLA (17–6)	Alabama (25–6)	Texas A&M (28–7)	UCLA (22–9)	Washington (28–7)	Florida (37–10)	Washington (31–10)	Georgia (38–15)	Baylor (36–23)	14.
15.	Nebraska	Alabama (5–0)	Florida (8–1)	Arizona (16–1)	California (19–2)	UCLA (14–6)	Alabama (22–5)	Mississippi State (24–7)	Mississippi State (25–9)	Alabama (29–8)	Mississippi State (29–12)	Virginia Tech (35–9–1)	Louisiana (38–15)	Washington (31–12)	Florida State (46–16)	15.
16.	Oregon	Baylor (0–2)	Florida State (5–3)	Florida (15–2)	Florida (19–3)	Clemson (17–6)	Missouri (22–6)	UCLA (18–8)	Alabama (26–8)	Virginia Tech (28–9–1)	UCLA (24–9)	Florida State (36–10)	LSU (36–13)	Florida State (41–13)	Arizona (37–18–1)	16.
17.	South Carolina	Virginia Tech (4–0–1)	Arizona (10–1)	Florida State (11–3)	Arizona (17–3–1)	Alabama (19–3)	Arkansas (22–6)	Texas State (26–7)	Arkansas (25–9)	Louisiana (27–13)	Louisiana (29–14)	Mississippi State (30–13)	Texas State (39–13)	Texas State (42–13)	Louisiana (45–19)	17.
18.	Virginia Tech	Kentucky (4–1)	Mississippi State (8–1)	Arkansas (13–3)	Mississippi State (17–3)	Mississippi State (19–4)	Mississippi State (21–6)	Kansas (22–8–1)	Texas State (29–8)	Missouri (30–10)	Virginia Tech (31–9–1)	Alabama (31–12)	Virginia Tech (38–11–1)	Virginia Tech (39–11–1)	Arkansas (37–18)	18.
19.	Texas A&M	Texas A&M (5–0)	Kentucky (6–2)	Texas A&M (14–1)	Texas A&M (19–2)	California (21–4)	Texas State (22–7)	California (24–8)	Louisiana (24–13)	Texas State (32–9)	Florida State (31–10)	Louisiana (33–15)	Alabama (32–14)	Mississippi State (33–17)	Texas State (47–15)	19.
20.	Auburn	Oregon (3–2)	South Carolina (8–1)	Kentucky (11–2)	South Carolina (18–2)	Arkansas (20–5)	Kansas (19–7–1)	Arkansas (24–8)	Clemson (24–10)	Florida State (28–10)	Northwestern (26–8)	Texas State (37–12)	Northwestern (31–9)	Northwestern (33–10)	Oregon (30–21)	20.
21.	Alabama	South Carolina (5–0)	California (10–1)	Mississippi State (11–3)	Arkansas (18–4)	Arizona (19–5–1)	California (21–7)	Clemson (22–9)	Florida State (24–9)	Northwestern (22–8)	Texas State (33–12)	Arizona (31–13–1)	Miami (OH) (40–7)	Miami (OH) (45–7)	Omaha (43–15)	21.
22.	Washington	Florida (4–1)	Baylor (3–3)	California (15–1)	UCLA (11–6)	South Carolina (18–5)	Baylor (16–8)	Penn State (23–6)	Penn State (26–7)	Penn State (28–8)	Arizona (28–13–1)	Northwestern (29–9)	Arizona (32–15–1)	Arizona (33–15–1)	Virginia (34–20)	22.
23.	Louisiana	Louisiana (4–1)	Virginia Tech (7–2–1)	UCLA (7–5)	Boston University (13–1)	Boston University (17–1)	Louisiana (18–12)	Louisiana (21–13)	California (26–10)	Kansas (25–12–1)	Penn State (30–9)	Kentucky (29–15)	Mississippi State (30–17)	Boston University (49–4–1)	Northwestern (35–13)	23.
24.	Florida	Indiana (4–1)	Auburn (4–1–1)	South Carolina (13–2)	Auburn (12–2–1)	Texas State (20–6)	Arizona (20–7–1)	Northwestern (16–7)	Northwestern (19–8)	Virginia (26–11)	Miami (OH) (32–6)	Boston University (40–4)	Boston University (45–4–1)	Alabama (33–16)	Washington (32–15)	24.
25.	San Diego State	Auburn (1–1–1)	Penn State (7–0)	Boston University (13–1)	Kentucky (13–4)	Georgia Tech (18–7)	South Carolina (21–7)	Florida Atlantic (27–7)	South Carolina (26–10)	Clemson (27–11)	Kentucky (26–15)	Miami (OH) (36–7)	Michigan (37–14)	Charlotte (36–16)	Liberty (38–25)	25.
	Preseason Jan 18	Week 1 Feb 12	Week 2 Feb 19	Week 3 Feb 26	Week 4 Mar 4	Week 5 Mar 11	Week 6 Mar 18	Week 7 Mar 25	Week 8 Apr 1	Week 9 Apr 8	Week 10 Apr 15	Week 11 Apr 22	Week 12 Apr 29	Week 13 May 6	Final Jun 11	
		Dropped: No. 10 UCLA; No. 15 Nebraska; No. 25 San Diego State	Dropped: No. 14 Utah; No. 20 Oregon; No. 23 Louisiana; No. 24 Indiana	Dropped: No. 24 Auburn; No. 25 Penn State	Dropped: No. 17 Florida State	Dropped: No. 24 Auburn; No. 25 Kentucky	Dropped: No. 23 Boston University; No. 25 Georgia Tech	Dropped: No. 22 Baylor; No. 24 Arizona; No. 25 South Carolina	Dropped: No. 18 Kansas; No. 25 Florida Atlantic	Dropped: No. 23 California; No. 25 South Carolina	Dropped: No. 23 Kansas; No. 24 Virginia; No. 25 Clemson	Dropped: No. 23 Penn State	Dropped: No. 23 Kentucky	Dropped: No. 25 Michigan	Dropped: No. 18 Virginia Tech; No. 19 Mississippi State; No. 21 Miami (OH); No. 23 Boston University; No. 25 Charlotte	
