= Wichita State Shockers softball =

- Founded: 1975
- University: Wichita State University
- Head coach: Kristi Bredbenner (14th season)
- Conference: The American
- Location: Wichita, Kansas, US
- Home stadium: Wilkins Stadium
- Nickname: Shockers
- Colors: Black and yellow

NCAA Tournament appearances
- 1989, 2005, 2016, 2018, 2021, 2022, 2023

Conference tournament championships
- MVC: 1989, 2016 AAC: 2021

Regular-season conference championships
- MVC: 2014, 2016 AAC: 2021, 2023, 2026

The Wichita State Shockers softball team represents Wichita State University in NCAA Division I college softball. The team participates in the American Conference. The Shockers are currently led by head coach Kristi Bredbenner. The team plays its home games at Wilkins Stadium located on the university's campus.

== History ==
=== Coaching history ===
Years	Coach	Record	%
1975–1976	Sue Bair	7–10–1	.417
1977–1979	Sharon Rauh	41–49	.456
1980–1981	Mary Estes	30–40	.429
1982–1984	Bethel Stout	48–63	.432
1985–1986	Cindy Bristow	29–65	.309
1987–1988	Steve Sink	32–63	.337
1989–1999	Jim Maynard	313–329-1	.488
2000–2002	Judy Favor	60–101	.373
2003–2005	Tim Walton	123–64	.658
2006–2011	Mike Perniciaro	168–179	.484
2012–Present	Kristi Bredbenner	320–254	.557

== Coaching staff ==
Name	Position coached	Consecutive season at Wichita State in current position
Kristi Bredbenner	Head coach	12th
Elizabeth Economon	Associate head coach	6th
Presley Bell	Assistant coach	2nd
Nicole Pendley	Director of operations	2nd
