= 2024 Louisiana Ragin' Cajuns softball team =

American college softball season

2024 Louisiana Ragin' Cajuns softball

Sun Belt Conference Regular Season champions

NCAA Lafayette Regional
- Conference: Sun Belt Conference
- Record: 45–19 (22–2 SBC)
- Head coach: Gerry Glasco (7th season)
- Assistant coaches: Justin Robichaux; Shellie Landry; Hunter Veach
- Home stadium: Yvette Girouard Field at Lamson Park

2024 Sun Belt Conference softball standings
	Conf.						Overall
Team	W		L		T	PCT	W		L		T	PCT
No. 21 Louisiana ‍†‍‍^{y}	22	–	2	–	0	.917	45	–	19	–	0	.703
Texas State ‍‍‡‍^{y}	18	–	6	–	0	.750	47	–	15	–	0	.758
South Alabama ‍‍‍^{y}	16	–	8	–	0	.667	34	–	20	–	1	.627
Coastal Carolina ‍‍‍	14	–	10	–	0	.583	34	–	21	–	0	.618
Troy ‍‍‍	13	–	11	–	0	.542	34	–	22	–	0	.607
Georgia Southern ‍‍‍	12	–	12	–	0	.500	30	–	21	–	0	.588
James Madison ‍‍‍	12	–	12	–	0	.500	31	–	22	–	0	.585
Louisiana-Monroe ‍‍‍	12	–	12	–	0	.500	31	–	24	–	0	.564
Marshall ‍‍‍	10	–	14	–	0	.417	25	–	28	–	0	.472
Southern Miss ‍‍‍	10	–	14	–	0	.417	22	–	29	–	0	.431
Appalachian State ‍‍‍	4	–	20	–	0	.167	21	–	30	–	0	.412
Georgia State ‍‍‍	1	–	23	–	0	.042	11	–	42	–	0	.208
† – Conference champion ‡ – Tournament champion y – Invited to the NCAA tournament As of May 19, 2024; Rankings from NFCA/USA Today

The 2024 Louisiana Ragin' Cajuns softball team represented the University of Louisiana at Lafayette during the 2024 NCAA Division I softball season. The Ragin' Cajuns played their home games at Yvette Girouard Field at Lamson Park and were led by seventh-year head coach Gerry Glasco. They were members of the Sun Belt Conference.

== Preseason ==
=== Sun Belt Conference Coaches Poll ===
The Sun Belt Conference Coaches Poll was released on January 31, 2024. Louisiana was picked to finish first in the conference with 144 votes and all first place votes (12). Sophomore outfielder Mihyia Davis was chosen as the Preseason Conference Player of the Year.

Coaches poll
Predicted finish	Team	Votes (1st place)
1	Louisiana	144 (12)
2	South Alabama	127
3	Texas State	122
4	Troy	98
5	James Madison	94
6	Coastal Carolina	81
7	Marshall	79
8	Louisiana–Monroe	59
9	Southern Miss	49
10	Georgia State	35
11	Georgia Southern	25
12	Appalachian State	23

=== Preseason All-Sun Belt team ===
- Lauren Allred (1st Base, LA)
- Taylor McKinney (2nd Base, TXST)
- Alexa Langeliers (2nd Base, LA)
- Sydney Bickel (Shortstop, MARSH)
- Brooke Ellestad (Shortstop, LA)
- Sara Vanderford (3rd Base, TXST)
- Delaney Keith (3rd Base, CCU)
- Mihyia Davis (Outfielder, LA)
- Mackenzie Brasher (Outfielder, USA)
- Kayt Houston (Outfielder, APP)
- Sophie Piskos (Catcher, LA)
- Iyana De Jesus (Designated Player, CCU)
- Jessica Mullins (Pitcher, TXST)
- Olivia Lackie (Pitcher, USA)
- Sam Landry (Pitcher, LA)

== Personnel ==
2024 Louisiana Ragin' Cajuns softball team
Players
Coaches

#	Pos.	Name	Bats/throws	Height	Year	Home town
1	P	Denali Loecker	R/R	5 ft 10 in (1.78 m)	Sr	Ogden, Iowa
2	INF	Gabbie Stutes	L/R	5 ft 3 in (1.6 m)	Fr	Lafayette, Louisiana
3	OF	Maddie Hayden	L/R	5 ft 4 in (1.63 m)	Jr	West Monroe, Louisiana
4	C	Victoria Valdez	R/R	5 ft 4 in (1.63 m)	So	Alvin, Texas
5	P	Sam Ryan	R/R	5 ft 8 in (1.73 m)	Jr	Monroe, New York
7	OF	Dayzja Williams	L/L	5 ft 5 in (1.65 m)	Fr	Alexandria, Louisiana
9	INF	Cecilia Vasquez	R/R	5 ft 6 in (1.68 m)	So	New Waverly, Texas
11	INF	Lauren Allred	L/R	5 ft 9 in (1.75 m)	So	Texarkana, Texas
12	P	Sam Landry	R/R	5 ft 10 in (1.78 m)	Jr	Mont Belvieu, Texas
15	OF	Laney Credeur	L/R	5 ft 4 in (1.63 m)	Jr	Old Mines, Missouri
16	P	Lexie Delbrey	R/R	5 ft 6 in (1.68 m)	Jr	Bainbridge, Georgia
17	INF	Brooke Ellestad	L/R	5 ft 10 in (1.78 m)	Jr	Kimberly, Wisconsin
18	C	Sam Roe	R/R	5 ft 5 in (1.65 m)	Jr	Destin, Florida
19	C	Sophie Piskos	R/R	5 ft 4 in (1.63 m)	Sr	Paris, Tennessee
21	INF	Lillian Soto	R/R	5 ft 9 in (1.75 m)	Fr	Ruston, Louisiana
23	INF	Alexa Langeliers	R/R	5 ft 7 in (1.7 m)	Jr	Keller, Texas
25	P	Chloe Riassetto	L/L	5 ft 6 in (1.68 m)	So	Friendswood, Texas
29	OF	Kayla Falterman	L/R	5 ft 4 in (1.63 m)	Jr	The Woodlands, Texas
33	OF	Samantha Graeter	R/R	5 ft 7 in (1.7 m)	Jr	Spring, Texas
42	OF	Mihyia Davis	L/R	5 ft 5 in (1.65 m)	So	Lovelady, Texas

Head coach

Gerry Glasco (Illinois)

Assistant coach(es)

Justin Robichaux (Louisiana)
Shellie Landry (Louisiana)
Hunter Veach (Auburn)

Legend

- (C) Team captain
- (S) Suspended
- (I) Ineligible
- Injured
- Current redshirt

Roster
Last update: 25 March 2024

== Schedule and results ==
Legend
	Louisiana win
	Louisiana loss
	Postponement/Cancellation
**Bold**	Louisiana team member

2024 Louisiana Ragin' Cajuns softball game log
Regular season (40–16)

February (8–9)
Date	Opponent	Rank	Site/stadium	Score	Win	Loss	Save	TV	Attendance	Overall record	SBC record
Louisiana Classics
Feb. 8	Chattanooga	No. 21	Yvette Girouard Field at Lamson Park • Lafayette, LA	**W** 21–2^{5}	**Delbrey** (1–0)	Lavdis (0–1)	None	ESPN+	802	1–0	
Feb. 9	California	No. 21	Yvette Girouard Field at Lamson Park • Lafayette, LA	**W** 8–0^{6}	**Landry** (1–0)	Roeling (0–1)	None	ESPN+	809	2–0	
Feb. 9	Chattanooga	No. 21	Yvette Girouard Field at Lamson Park • Lafayette, LA	**W** 5–2	**Delbrey** (2–0)	Long (0–1)	**Loecker** (1)	ESPN+	857	3–0	
Feb. 11	New Mexico	No. 21	Yvette Girouard Field at Lamson Park • Lafayette, LA	**W** 10–2^{5}	**Riassetto** (1–0)	Guest (1–2)	None	ESPN+	788	4–0	
Feb. 11	California	No. 21	Yvette Girouard Field at Lamson Park • Lafayette, LA	**L** 1–3	Roelling (1-1)	**Landry** (1-1)	None	ESPN+	788	4–1	
Feb. 13	at Mississippi State	No. 23	Nusz Park • Starkville, MS	**L** 1–9^{6}	Wesley (2–0)	**Landry** (1–2)	None	SECN+	327	4–2	
Feb. 13	at Mississippi State	No. 23	Nusz Park • Starkville, MS	**L** 1–2	Marron (2–0)	**Landry** (1–3)	None	SECN+	327	4–3	
Feb. 16	No. 24 Baylor	No. 23	Yvette Girouard Field at Lamson Park • Lafayette, LA	**W** 4–1	**Riassetto** (2–0)	Binford (0–2)	None	ESPN+	913	5–3	
Feb. 18	No. 24 Baylor	No. 23	Yvette Girouard Field at Lamson Park • Lafayette, LA	**L** 0–6	Crandall (2–0)	**Delbrey** (2–1)	Orme (1)	ESPN+	1,194	5–4	
Feb. 18	No. 24 Baylor	No. 23	Yvette Girouard Field at Lamson Park • Lafayette, LA	**L** 2–3	Binford (1–2)	**Landry** (1–4)	Crandall (1)	ESPN+	1,194	5–5	
Feb. 20	Louisiana Tech		Yvette Girouard Field at Lamson Park • Lafayette, LA	**W** 9–3	**Riassetto** (3–0)	Melnychuk (2–1)	None	ESPN+	1,206	6–5	
Lone Star State Invitational
Feb. 23	vs. No. 13 Stanford		Red and Charline McCombs Field • Austin, TX	**L** 1–4	Canady (3–2)	**Landry** (1–5)	None	LHN		6–6	
Feb. 23	at No. 2 Texas		Red and Charline McCombs Field • Austin, TX	**L** 0–5	Kavan (4–0)	**Riassetto** (3–1)	None	LHN	1,848	6–7	
Feb. 24	vs. Colorado State		Red and Charline McCombs Field • Austin, TX	**W** 4–2	**Landry** (2–5)	Serna (3-3)	None	LHN		7–7	
Feb. 24	vs. No. 13 Stanford		Red and Charline McCombs Field • Austin, TX	**L** 0–8^{6}	Krause (4–1)	**Riassetto** (3–2)	None	LHN		7–8	
Feb. 25	at No. 2 Texas		Red and Charline McCombs Field • Austin, TX	**L** 4–5	Morgan (3–0)	**Loecker** (0–1)	Kavan (1)	LHN	1,945	7–9	
Feb. 27	at Nicholls		Swanner Field at Geo Surfaces Park • Thibodaux, LA	**W** 8–2	**Landry** (3–5)	Paden (3–1)	None	ESPN+	213	8–9	

March (16–4)
Date	Opponent	Rank	Site/stadium	Score	Win	Loss	Save	TV	Attendance	Overall record	SBC record
Oklahoma Tournament
Mar. 1	vs. Miami		Marita Hynes Field • Norman, OK	**L** 10–12	Jarvis (5–1)	**Delbrey** (2-2)	None		219	8–10	
Mar. 2	at No. 1 Oklahoma		Love's Field • Norman, OK	**L** 0–8^{5}	Deal (3–0)	**Loecker** (0–2)	None	ESPN+	4,450	8–11	
Mar. 2	vs. Liberty		Love's Field • Norman, OK	**W** 1–0	**Landry** (4–5)	Yoder (2–4)	None		167	9–11	
Mar. 3	vs. Liberty		Love's Field • Norman, OK	**L** 1–7	Love (1–3)	**Loecker** (0–3)	Yoder (2)		338	9–12	
Mar. 3	at No. 1 Oklahoma		Love's Field • Norman, OK	**W** 7–5^{8}	**Riassetto** (4–2)	Keeney (2–1)	None	ESPN+	4,450	10–12	
Milisa Moore Tournament
Mar. 9	vs. Stephen F. Austin		Farris Field • Conway, AR	**W** 11–0^{5}	**Landry** (5-5)	Telford (2–7)	None		154	11–12	
Mar. 9	at Central Arkansas		Farris Field • Conway, AR	**W** 7–4	**Riassetto** (5–2)	Petty (3–5)	None		318	12–12	
Mar. 10	vs. Stephen F. Austin		Farris Field • Conway, AR	**W** 13–4	**Loecker** (1–3)	Brown (2–6)	None		193	13–12	
Mar. 10	at Central Arkansas		Farris Field • Conway, AR	**W** 10–0^{5}	**Landry** (6–5)	Runner (4–7)	None	ESPN+	206	14–12	
Mar. 13	McNeese		Yvette Girouard Field at Lamson Park • Lafayette, LA	**W** 2–1	**Landry** (7–5)	Sanders (6-6)	**Riassetto** (1)	ESPN+	1,438	15–12	
Mar. 15	at South Alabama		Jaguar Field • Mobile, AL	**W** 3–2	**Landry** (8–5)	Lackie (10–4)	**Riassetto** (2)	ESPN+	750	16–12	1–0
Mar. 16	at South Alabama		Jaguar Field • Mobile, AL	**W** 6–2	**Riassetto** (6–2)	Lagle (1–3)	None	ESPN+	504	17–12	2–0
Mar. 16	at South Alabama		Jaguar Field • Mobile, AL	**W** 15–3^{8}	**Landry** (9–5)	Lackie (10–5)	None	ESPN+	504	18–12	3–0
Mar. 20	at Louisiana Tech		Dr. Billy Bundrick Field • Ruston, LA	**L** 3–5	Menzina (2–0)	**Landry** (9–6)	Melnychuk (2)	ESPN+	798	18–13	
Mar. 22	Coastal Carolina		Yvette Girouard Field at Lamson Park • Lafayette, LA	**W** 7–5	**Landry** (10–6)	Brabham (12–6)	**Riassetto** (3)	ESPN+	1,083	19–13	4–0
Mar. 23	Coastal Carolina		Yvette Girouard Field at Lamson Park • Lafayette, LA	**W** 13–0^{5}	**Delbrey** (3–2)	Hood (0–1)	None	ESPN+	1,310	20–13	5–0
Mar. 24	Coastal Carolina		Yvette Girouard Field at Lamson Park • Lafayette, LA	**W** 3–1	**Landry** (11–6)	Brabham (12–7)	**Riassetto** (4)	ESPN+	1,222	21–13	6–0
Mar. 28	at Appalachian State		Sywassink/Lloyd Family Stadium • Boone, NC	**W** 12–6	**Landry** (12–6)	Neas (5–7)	None	ESPN+	47	22–13	7–0
Mar. 29	at Appalachian State		Sywassink/Lloyd Family Stadium • Boone, NC	**W** 6–2	**Riassetto** (7–2)	Buckner (2–3)	**Landry** (1)	ESPN+	425	23–13	8–0
Mar. 30	at Appalachian State		Sywassink/Lloyd Family Stadium • Boone, NC	**W** 8–0	**Landry** (13–6)	Neas (5–8)	None	ESPN+	380	24–13	9–0

April (14–2)
Date	Opponent	Rank	Site/stadium	Score	Win	Loss	Save	TV	Attendance	Overall record	SBC record
Apr. 5	James Madison		Yvette Girouard Field at Lamson Park • Lafayette, LA	**W** 5–3	**Landry** (14–6)	Humphrey (8–4)	**Riassetto** (5)	ESPN+	1,280	25–13	10–0
Apr. 6	James Madison		Yvette Girouard Field at Lamson Park • Lafayette, LA	**W** 7–1	**Riassetto** (8-2)	Fleet (6-3)	None	ESPN+	1,411	26–13	11–0
Apr. 7	James Madison		Yvette Girouard Field at Lamson Park • Lafayette, LA	**W** 9–2	**Riassetto** (9–2)	List (6–7)	None	ESPN+	1,218	27–13	12–0
Apr. 12	at No. 25 Texas State		Bobcat Softball Stadium • San Marcos, TX	**W** 7–0	**Landry** (15–6)	Mullins (21–6)	None	ESPN+	584	28–13	13–0
Apr. 13	at No. 25 Texas State		Bobcat Softball Stadium • San Marcos, TX	**W** 6–0	**Riassetto** (10–2)	Azua (6–5)	None	ESPN+	787	29–13	14–0
Apr. 14	at No. 25 Texas State		Bobcat Softball Stadium • San Marcos, TX	**L** 0–5	Mullins (22–6)	**Landry** (15–7)	None	ESPN+	564	29–14	14–1
Apr. 16	at No. 7 LSU	No. 25	Tiger Park • Baton Rouge, LA	**L** 2–4	Berzon (15–4)	**Riassetto** (10–3)	None	SECN+	2,108	29–15	
Apr. 17	Nicholls	No. 25	Yvette Girouard Field at Lamson Park • Lafayette, LA	**W** 9–0^{6}	**Landry** (16–7)	Yoo (6–6)	None	ESPN+	1,164	30–15	
Apr. 19	Southern Miss	No. 25	Yvette Girouard Field at Lamson Park • Lafayette, LA	**W** 2–1	**Landry** (17–7)	Lee (8–6)	None	ESPN+	1,241	31–15	15–1
Apr. 20	Southern Miss	No. 25	Yvette Girouard Field at Lamson Park • Lafayette, LA	**W** 14–3^{5}	**Riassetto** (11–3)	Craft (1–3)	None	ESPN+		32–15	16–1
Apr. 21	Southern Miss	No. 25	Yvette Girouard Field at Lamson Park • Lafayette, LA	**W** 9–2	**Delbrey** (4–2)	Lee (8–7)	None	ESPN+	1,278	33–15	17–1
Apr. 23	No. 7 LSU	No. 19	Yvette Girouard Field at Lamson Park • Lafayette, LA	**W** 9–4	**Riassetto** (12–3)	**Caffin** (10-4)	None	ESPN+	2576	34–15	
Apr. 24	at McNeese	No. 19	Joe Miller Field at Cowgirl Diamond • Lake Charles, LA	**W** 5-4	**Landry** (18-7)	**Sanders** (16-8)	**Riassetto** (6)	ESPN+	1,027	35–15	
Apr. 26	at Louisiana–Monroe	No. 19	Geo-Surfaces Field at the ULM Softball Complex • Monroe, LA	**W** 5-4	**Landry** (19-7)	**Hulett** (1-1)	None	ESPN+	836	36–15	18–1
Apr. 27	at Louisiana–Monroe	No. 19	Geo-Surfaces Field at the ULM Softball Complex • Monroe, LA	**W** 1-0	**Landry** (20-7)	**Nichols** (9-10)	None	ESPN+	906	37–15	19–1
Apr. 28	at Louisiana–Monroe	No. 19	Geo-Surfaces Field at the ULM Softball Complex • Monroe, LA	**W** 5-2	**Riassetto** (13-3)	**Abrams** (10-11)	None	ESPN+	859	38–15	20–1

May (2–1)
Date	Opponent	Rank	Site/stadium	Score	Win	Loss	Save	TV	Attendance	Overall record	SBC record
May 2	Troy	No. 17	Yvette Girouard Field at Lamson Park • Lafayette, LA	**L** 0-1	**Money** (2-1)	**Landry** (20-8)	**Baker** (1)	ESPN+	1,238	38–16	20–2
May 3	Troy	No. 17	Yvette Girouard Field at Lamson Park • Lafayette, LA	**W** 11-7	**Landry** (21-8)	**Money** (2-2)	None	ESPN+	1,304	39–16	21–2
May 4	Troy	No. 17	Yvette Girouard Field at Lamson Park • Lafayette, LA	**W** 4-1	**Landry** (22-8)	**Baker** (14-11)	**Riassetto** (7)	ESPN+	1,412	40–16	22–2

Postseason (3–1)

SBC Tournament (2–1)
Date	Opponent	(Seed)/Rank	Site/stadium	Score	Win	Loss	Save	TV	Attendance	Overall record	Tournament record
May 9	James Madison	(1)/No. 18	Bobcat Softball Stadium • San Marcos, TX	**W** 8-0^{5}	**Landry** (23-8)	**List** (10-9)	None	ESPN+		41–16	1–0
May 10	Troy	(1)/No. 18	Bobcat Softball Stadium • San Marcos, TX	**W** 4-2	**Landry** (24-8)	**Baker** (15-12)	**Riassetto** (8)	ESPN+		42–16	2–0
May 11	Texas State	(1)/No. 18	Bobcat Softball Stadium • San Marcos, TX	**L** 5-9	**Mullins** (30-7)	**Riassetto** (13-4)	None	ESPN+	807	42–17	2–1

NCAA Tournament (3–1)
Date	Opponent	(Seed)/Rank	Site/stadium	Score	Win	Loss	Save	TV	Attendance	Overall record	Tournament record
Lafayette Regional
May 17	Princeton	(13)/No. 16	Yvette Girouard Field at Lamson Park • Lafayette, LA	**W** 8-0^{5}	**Loecker** (2-3)	**Harrington** (9-6)	None	ESPN+	1,578	43–17	1–0
May 18	Baylor	(13)/No. 16	Yvette Girouard Field at Lamson Park • Lafayette, LA	**L** 0-8^{5}	**Crandall** (15-8)	**Landry** (24-9)	None	ESPN+	1,922	43–18	1–1
May 18	Princeton	(13)/No. 16	Yvette Girouard Field at Lamson Park • Lafayette, LA	**W** 2-1^{8}	**Riassetto** (14-4)	**Wright** (6-4)	None	ESPN+	1,644	44–18	2–1
May 19	Baylor	(13)/No. 16	Yvette Girouard Field at Lamson Park • Lafayette, LA	**W** 13-0^{5}	**Riassetto** (15-4)	**Binford** (13-11)	None	ESPN+	1,776	45–18	3–1
May 19	Baylor	(13)/No. 16	Yvette Girouard Field at Lamson Park • Lafayette, LA	**W** 3–4	Crandall (16-8)	**Landry** (24-10)	None	ESPN+	1,918	45–19	3–2

Schedule source:

*Rankings are based on the team's current ranking in the NFCA/USA Softball poll.

== Lafayette Regional ==
Lafayette Regional Teams
(1) Louisiana Ragin' Cajuns	(2) Baylor Bears	(3) Ole Miss Rebels	(4) Princeton Tigers

First Round
13	Louisiana	8^{(5)}
Princeton	0
Ole Miss	1
Baylor	3
Lower round 1
Princeton	4
Ole Miss	2

Semi-Finals
13	Louisiana	0
Baylor	8^{(5)}
Lower final
13	Louisiana	2^{(8)}
Princeton	1

Finals
Baylor	0	4
13	Louisiana	13^{(5)}	3

== Rankings ==
Ranking movements Legend: ██ Increase in ranking ██ Decrease in ranking — = Not ranked
	Week															
Poll	Pre	1	2	3	4	5	6	7	8	9	10	11	12	13	14	Final
NFCA / USA Today	21	23	—	—	—	—	—	—	—	—	25	25	21	21	20	
Softball America	23	23	—	—	—	—	23	23	19	17	17	19	15	12		
ESPN.com/USA Softball	21	23	—	—	—	—	—	25	24	21	19	19	17	18	16	
D1Softball	21	—	—	—	—	—	—	—	—	24	20	20	17	17		
