= 2024 BYU Cougars softball team =

Softball Team

2024 BYU Cougars softball
- Conference: Big 12 Conference
- Record: 31–23 (11–16 Big 12 Conference)
- Head coach: Gordon Eakin (22nd season)
- Assistant coaches: Pete Meredith (11th season); Allie Hancock-Schneemann (1st season); Ken Brooke (1st season)
- Home stadium: Gail Miller Field

2024 Big 12 Conference softball standings
	Conf.						Overall
Team	W		L		T	PCT	W		L		T	PCT
No. 2 Texas ‍†‍‍^{y}	23	–	4	–	0	.852	55	–	10	–	0	.846
No. 1 Oklahoma ‍‍‡‍^{y}	22	–	5	–	0	.815	59	–	7	–	0	.894
No. 6 Oklahoma State ‍‍‍^{y}	21	–	6	–	0	.778	49	–	12	–	0	.803
Baylor ‍‍‍^{y}	14	–	13	–	0	.519	36	–	23	–	0	.610
UCF ‍‍‍^{y}	12	–	15	–	0	.444	31	–	25	–	0	.554
BYU ‍‍‍	11	–	16	–	0	.407	31	–	23	–	0	.574
Kansas ‍‍‍	11	–	16	–	0	.407	28	–	25	–	1	.528
Texas Tech ‍‍‍	8	–	16	–	0	.333	29	–	21	–	0	.580
Iowa State ‍‍‍	6	–	18	–	0	.250	20	–	31	–	0	.392
Houston ‍‍‍	4	–	23	–	0	.148	25	–	30	–	0	.455
† – Conference champion ‡ – Tournament champion y – Invited to the NCAA Tournament; As of June 11, 2024; Rankings from NFCA/USA Today

The 2024 BYU Cougars softball team represents Brigham Young University in the 2024 NCAA Division I softball season. Gordon Eakin enters the year as head coach of the Cougars for the 22nd consecutive season. 2024 is the first season that sees the Cougars as members of the Big 12 Conference. BYU enter 2024 having won 13 of the last 14 conference championships but being picked to finish 7th in their new conference.

== 2024 Roster ==
2024 BYU Cougars Roster
Pitchers: 1 Gianna Mares - Freshman; 14 Alyssa Aguilar - Junior; 17 Olivia Laney - Freshman; 18 Kaysen Korth - Sophomore; 26 Kate Dahle - Freshman; 38 Chloe Temples - Senior; 44 Hina Huber - Sophomore; 50 Ailana Agbayani - Sophomore; Catchers: 3 Macy Simmons - Senior; 9 Abbey Gillespie - Freshman; 20 Hailey Morrow - Sophomore; 21 Lyndsey Madrigal - Junior	Infielders: 2 Breezy Hayward - Sophomore; 6 Keila Kamoku - Junior; 7 Aleia Agbayani - Senior; 13 Lily Owens - Sophomore; 20 Hailey Morrow - Sophomore; 28 Tristen Turlington - Sophomore; 34 Maddie Udall - Sophomore; 50 Ailana Agbayani - Sophomore; 54 Huntyr Ava - Senior	Outfielders: 1 Gianna Mares - Freshman; 7 Aleia Agbayani - Senior; 11 Jaelynn Lambert - Junior; 12 Lauren Flanders - Junior; 15 Taryn Lennon - Senior; 22 Maddie Bejarano - Senior; 23 Violet Zavodnik - Senior; 28 Tristen Turlington - Sophomore; 51 Lexie Bennett - Sophomore

== Schedule ==
2024 BYU Cougars Game Log
Paradise Classic
February

Date	Opponent	Rank	Site/stadium	Television	Score	Win	Loss	Save	Attendance	Overall record	Big 12 record
February 8	vs. Kansas City	–	Rainbow Wahine Softball Stadium		17–8 ^{(6)}	Kate Dahle (1–0)	Sheridon Wilber (0–1)	None	350	1–0	–
February 8	vs. Ole Miss	–	Rainbow Wahine Softball Stadium		7–4	Chloe Temples (1–0)	Catelyn Riley (0–1)	None	550	2–0	–
February 9	vs. Nevada	–	Rainbow Wahine Softball Stadium		8–0	Kate Dahle (2–0)	Taryn Irimata (0–1)	None	600	3–0	–
February 10	vs. Kansas City	–	Rainbow Wahine Softball Stadium		3–0	Gianna Mares (1–0)	Camryn Stickel (0–3)	Chloe Temples (1)	400	4–0	–
February 10	at Hawai′i	–	Rainbow Wahine Softball Stadium		3–2	Chloe Temples (2–0)	Key-annah Campbell-Pua (0–2)	None	700	5–0	–

Littlewood Classic
February

Date	Opponent	Rank	Site/stadium	Television	Score	Win	Loss	Save	Attendance	Overall record	Big 12 record
February 15	at Arizona State	–	Alberta B. Farrington Softball Stadium	P12+ Arizona State	6–10	Mac Osborne (3–0)	Gianna Mares (1–1)	None	1,040	5–1	–
February 16	vs. #21 Virginia Tech	–	Alberta B. Farrington Softball Stadium		1–2	Lyndsey Grein (2–0)	Kate Dahle (2–1)	None	280	5–2	–
February 16	vs. Illinois State	–	Alberta B. Farrington Softball Stadium		10–0 ^{(5)}	Chloe Temples (3–0)	Hannah Meshnick (0–4)	None	288	6–2	–
February 17	vs. Memphis	–	Alberta B. Farrington Softball Stadium		12–5	Kaysen Korth (1–0)	Taniyah Brown (0–4)	None	259	7–2	–
February 17	vs. Cal State Fullerton	–	Alberta B. Farrington Softball Stadium		6–5 ^{(8)}	Kate Dahle (3–1)	Haley Rainey (2–2)	None	360	8–2	–

Mary Nutter Collegiate Classic
February

Date	Opponent	Rank	Site/stadium	Television	Score	Win	Loss	Save	Attendance	Overall record	Big 12 record
February 22	vs. Bethune-Cookman	–	Big League Dreams Cathedral City Yankee Field	FloSoftball	18–5 ^{(5)}	Gianna Mares (2–1)	Alyssa Brady (0–1)	None	213	9–2	–
February 22	vs. UC Riverside	–	Big League Dreams Cathedral City Fenway Field	FloSoftball	5–3	Chloe Temples (4–0)	Briza Blanco (2–2)	None	143	10–2	–
February 23	vs. Long Beach State	–	Big League Dreams Cathedral City Pawtuckett Field	FloSoftball	4–6	Sophia Fernandez (1–3)	Kate Dahle (3–2)	None	315	10–3	–
February 24	vs. Cal Poly	–	Big League Dreams Cathedral City Des Moines Field	FloSoftball	19–3 ^{(5)}	Chloe Temples (5–0)	Kate Judy (3–3)	None	317	11–3	–
February 24	vs. Rutgers	–	Big League Dreams Cathedral City Fenway Field	FloSoftball	9–1 ^{(5)}	Kate Dahle (4–2)	Mattie Boyd (6–2)	None	172	12–3	–

Capital Classic
February/March

Date	Opponent	Rank	Site/stadium	Television	Score	Win	Loss	Save	Attendance	Overall record	Big 12 record
February 29	at Sacramento State	–	Shea Stadium	ESPN+	3–4	Marissa Bertuccio (3-1)	Chloe Temples (5–1)	None	123	12–4	–
February 29	vs. UC Davis	–	Shea Stadium	ESPN+	5–3	Alyssa Aguilar (1–0)	Caroline Grimes (2–3)	None	194	13–4	–
March 1	vs. Utah State	–	La Rue Field		Cancelled- inclement weather						
March 2	vs. UC Santa Barbara	–	La Rue Field		8–3	Gianna Mares (3–1)	Ainsley Waddell (1–6)	Kate Dahle (1)	146	14–4	–

Regular season
March

Date	Opponent	Rank	Site/stadium	Television	Score	Win	Loss	Save	Attendance	Overall record	Big 12 record
March 7	Texas Tech*	–	Gail Miller Field	ESPN+	5–10	Maddie Kuehl (6–3)	Chloe Temples (5–2)	None	331	14–5	0–1
March 8	Texas Tech*	–	Gail Miller Field	ESPN+	0–15 _{(5)}	Maddy Wright (6–1)	Gianna Mares (3–2)	None	318	14–6	0–2
March 9	Texas Tech*	–	Gail Miller Field	ESPN+	10–8	Gianna Mares (4–2)	Maddy Wright (6–2)	Kate Dahle (2)	582	15–6	1–2
March 11	Utah Valley	–	Gail Miller Field	BYU Softball on Facebook	9–7	Ailana Agbayani (1–0)	Halle Morris (3–5)	None	517	16–6	–
March 14	at #3 Texas*	–	Red & Charline McCombs Field	LHN	0–13 _{(5)}	Mac Morgan (5–0)	Kate Dahle (4–3)	None	1,812	16–7	1–3
March 15	at #3 Texas*	–	Red & Charline McCombs Field	LHN	0–10 _{(5)}	Citlaly Gutierrez (5–0)	Kate Dahle (4–4)	None	1,812	16–8	1–4
March 15	at #3 Texas*	–	Red & Charline McCombs Field	LHN	3–7	Mac Morgan (6–0)	Gianna Mares (4–3)	None	1,812	16–9	1–5
March 18	at Utah	–	Dumke Family Softball Stadium	P12+ Utah	1–3	Mariah Lopez (8–5)	Gianna Mares (4–4)	None	1,029	16–10	–
March 21	#6 Oklahoma State*	–	Gail Miller Field	ESPN+	2–3	Lexi Kilfoyl (11–2)	Gianna Mares (4–5)	None	640	16–11	1–6
March 22	#6 Oklahoma State*	–	Gail Miller Field	ESPN+	11–8	Kate Dahle (5–4)	Kyra Aycock (4–2)	None	692	17–11	2–6
March 23	#6 Oklahoma State*	–	Gail Miller Field	ESPN+						–	–
March 26	at Utah Tech	–	Karl Brooks Field	WAC DN						–	–
March 28	Houston*	–	Gail Miller Field	ESPN+						–	–
March 29	Houston*	–	Gail Miller Field	ESPN+						–	–
March 30	Houston*	–	Gail Miller Field	ESPN+						–	–

April

Date	Opponent	Rank	Site/stadium	Television	Score	Win	Loss	Save	Attendance	Overall record	Big 12 record
April 2	Utah Tech	–	Gail Miller Field	ESPN+						–	–
April 4	at UCF*	–	UCF Softball Complex	ESPN+						–	–
April 5	at UCF*	–	UCF Softball Complex	ESPN+						–	–
April 6	at UCF*	–	UCF Softball Complex	ESPN+						–	–
April 9	at Utah Valley	–	Wolverine Field	ESPN+ or WAC DN						–	–
April 11	at Oklahoma*	–	Love's Field	ESPN+						–	–
April 12	at Oklahoma*	–	Love's Field	ESPN+						–	–
April 13	at Oklahoma*	–	Love's Field	ESPN+						–	–
April 16	Idaho State	–	Gail Miller Field	ESPN+						–	–
April 18	Iowa State*	–	Gail Miller Field	ESPN+						–	–
April 19	Iowa State*	–	Gail Miller Field	ESPN+						–	–
April 20	Iowa State*	–	Gail Miller Field	ESPN+						–	–
April 25	Baylor*	–	Gail Miller Field	ESPN+						–	–
April 26	Baylor*	–	Gail Miller Field	ESPN+						–	–
April 27	Baylor*	–	Gail Miller Field	ESPN+						–	–
April 30	at Idaho State	–	Miller Ranch Stadium	ESPN+						–	–

May

Date	Opponent	Rank	Site/stadium	Television	Score	Win	Loss	Save	Attendance	Overall record	Big 12 record
May 2	at Kansas*	–	Arrocha Ballpark	ESPN+						–	–
May 3	at Kansas*	–	Arrocha Ballpark	ESPN+						–	–
May 4	at Kansas*	–	Arrocha Ballpark	ESPN+						–	–

2024 Big 12 Conference softball tournament
May

Date	Opponent	Rank	Site/stadium	Television	Score	Win	Loss	Save	Attendance	Overall record	Big 12 record
May 8	vs.	–	USA Softball Hall of Fame Stadium	ESPN+						–	–

Rankings from NFCA. Parenthesis indicate tournament seedings.
*Big 12 Conference games

== TV and Streaming Broadcast Information ==
- Arizona State: Tia Reid, Scott Sandulli, & Grace Hand
- Bethune-Cookman: Jon Gross
- UC Riverside: Chris Hooks
- Long Beach State: Taylor Storr
- Cal Poly: Joe Simmons
- Rutgers: Chris Hooks
- Sacramento State: Will Schilling
- UC Davis: Will Schilling
- Texas Tech: Spencer Linton and Taylei Williams
- Texas Tech: Spencer Linton and Taylei Williams
- Texas Tech: Spencer Linton and Taylei Williams
- Utah Valley: No commentary
- Texas: Alex Loeb and Cat Osterman
- Texas DH: Alex Loeb and Cat Osterman
- Utah: Jacob Suomi
- Oklahoma State: Dave McCann and Taylei Williams
- Oklahoma State: Brandon Crow and Taylei Williams
- Oklahoma State: TBA and Taylei Williams
- Utah Tech:
- Houston:
- Houston:
- Houston:
- Utah Tech:
- UCF:
- UCF:
- UCF:
- Utah Valley:
- Oklahoma:
- Oklahoma:
- Oklahoma:
- Idaho State:
- Iowa State:
- Iowa State:
- Iowa State:
- Baylor:
- Baylor:
- Baylor:
- Idaho State:
- Kansas:
- Kansas:
- Kansas:
- Big 12 Tournament:

== See also ==
- 2023 BYU Cougars football team
- 2023–24 BYU Cougars men's basketball team
- 2023–24 BYU Cougars women's basketball team
- 2023 BYU Cougars women's soccer team
- 2023 BYU Cougars women's volleyball team
- 2024 BYU Cougars men's volleyball team
- 2024 BYU Cougars baseball team
