= 2024 Big 12 Conference softball tournament =

- Teams: 10
- Format: Single-elimination tournament
- Finals site: Devon Park; Oklahoma City, Oklahoma
- Champions: Oklahoma (9th title)
- Runner-up: Texas
- Winning coach: Patty Gasso (9th title)
- MVP: Ella Parker (Oklahoma)

2024 Big 12 Conference softball standings
	Conf.						Overall
Team	W		L		T	PCT	W		L		T	PCT
No. 2 Texas ‍†‍‍^{y}	23	–	4	–	0	.852	55	–	10	–	0	.846
No. 1 Oklahoma ‍‍‡‍^{y}	22	–	5	–	0	.815	59	–	7	–	0	.894
No. 6 Oklahoma State ‍‍‍^{y}	21	–	6	–	0	.778	49	–	12	–	0	.803
Baylor ‍‍‍^{y}	14	–	13	–	0	.519	36	–	23	–	0	.610
UCF ‍‍‍^{y}	12	–	15	–	0	.444	31	–	25	–	0	.554
BYU ‍‍‍	11	–	16	–	0	.407	31	–	23	–	0	.574
Kansas ‍‍‍	11	–	16	–	0	.407	28	–	25	–	1	.528
Texas Tech ‍‍‍	8	–	16	–	0	.333	29	–	21	–	0	.580
Iowa State ‍‍‍	6	–	18	–	0	.250	20	–	31	–	0	.392
Houston ‍‍‍	4	–	23	–	0	.148	25	–	30	–	0	.455
† – Conference champion ‡ – Tournament champion y – Invited to the NCAA Tournament; As of June 11, 2024; Rankings from NFCA/USA Today

The 2024 Big 12 Conference softball tournament was held at Devon Park in Oklahoma City, Oklahoma from May 8 to May 11, 2024. As the tournament winner, Oklahoma earned the Big 12 Conference's automatic bid to the 2024 NCAA Division I softball tournament.

== Format ==
All ten teams will be seeded based on conference winning percentage. They then will play a single-elimination tournament, with the top six seeds receiving a first-round bye.

== Bracket ==
First Round; May 8
7	Kansas	6
10	Houston	5
8	Texas Tech	10^{(8)}
9	Iowa State	9

Quarterfinals; May 9
2	Oklahoma	10^{(5)}
7	Kansas	1
3	Oklahoma State	2
6	BYU	7
1	Texas	13^{(5)}
8	Texas Tech	4
4	Baylor	3
5	UCF	2

Semifinals; May 10
2	Oklahoma	13^{(5)}
6	BYU	2
1	Texas	14^{(5)}
4	Baylor	3

Finals; May 11
2	Oklahoma	5
1	Texas	1

== Schedule ==
Game	Time*	Matchup^{#}	Score	Television
First Round – Wednesday, May 8
1	5:00 p.m.	No. 7 Kansas vs. No. No. 10 Houston	6–5	Big 12 Now
2	7:30 p.m.	No. 8 Texas Tech vs. No. 9 Iowa State	10–9 ^{(8)}	Big 12 Now
Quarterfinals – Thursday, May 9
3	11:00 a.m.	No. 3 Oklahoma State vs. No. 6 BYU	2–7	Big 12 Now
4	1:30 p.m.	No. 2 Oklahoma vs. No. 7 Kansas	10–1 ^{(5)}	Big 12 Now
5	5:00 p.m.	No. 1 Texas vs. No. 8 Texas Tech	13–4 ^{(5)}	Big 12 Now
6	7:30 p.m.	No. 4 Baylor vs. No. 5 UCF	3–2	Big 12 Now
Semifinals – Friday, May 10
7	5:00 p.m.	No. 6 BYU vs. No. 2 Oklahoma	2–13 ^{(5)}	Big 12 Now
8	7:30 p.m.	No. 1 Texas vs. No. 4 Baylor	14–3 ^{(5)}	Big 12 Now
Championship – Saturday, May 11
9	6:30 p.m.	No. 2 Oklahoma vs. No. 1 Texas	5–1	ESPN2
*Game times in CST. # – Rankings denote tournament seed.

== All-Tournament Team ==
The following players were named to the all-tournament team:

Player	School
Aliyah Binford	Baylor
Chloe Temples	BYU
Alyssa Brito	Oklahoma
Kierston Deal	Oklahoma
Kinzie Hansen	Oklahoma
Kelly Maxwell	Oklahoma
Ella Parker (MOP)	Oklahoma
Bella Dayton	Texas
Joley Mitchell	Texas
Katie Stewart	Texas
Kennedy Crites	Texas Tech
