= 2024 Oklahoma Sooners softball team =

College softball season

2024 Oklahoma Sooners softball

Big 12 tournament champions NCAA Norman Regional champion NCAA Norman Super Regional champion

National champions
- Conference: Big 12 Conference
- Record: 59–7 (22–5 Big 12)
- Head coach: Patty Gasso (30th season)
- Assistant coaches: Jennifer Rocha; JT Gasso; Falepolima Steele
- Home stadium: Love's Field

2024 Big 12 Conference softball standings
| | Conf. | | | | | | Overall |
| Team | W | | L | | T | PCT | W | | L | | T | PCT |
|---|---|---|---|---|---|---|---|---|---|---|---|---|
| No. 2 Texas ‍†‍‍^{y} | 23 | – | 4 | – | 0 | .852 | 55 | – | 10 | – | 0 | .846 |
| No. 1 Oklahoma ‍‍‡‍^{y} | 22 | – | 5 | – | 0 | .815 | 59 | – | 7 | – | 0 | .894 |
| No. 6 Oklahoma State ‍‍‍^{y} | 21 | – | 6 | – | 0 | .778 | 49 | – | 12 | – | 0 | .803 |
| Baylor ‍‍‍^{y} | 14 | – | 13 | – | 0 | .519 | 36 | – | 23 | – | 0 | .610 |
| UCF ‍‍‍^{y} | 12 | – | 15 | – | 0 | .444 | 31 | – | 25 | – | 0 | .554 |
| BYU ‍‍‍ | 11 | – | 16 | – | 0 | .407 | 31 | – | 23 | – | 0 | .574 |
| Kansas ‍‍‍ | 11 | – | 16 | – | 0 | .407 | 28 | – | 25 | – | 1 | .528 |
| Texas Tech ‍‍‍ | 8 | – | 16 | – | 0 | .333 | 29 | – | 21 | – | 0 | .580 |
| Iowa State ‍‍‍ | 6 | – | 18 | – | 0 | .250 | 20 | – | 31 | – | 0 | .392 |
| Houston ‍‍‍ | 4 | – | 23 | – | 0 | .148 | 25 | – | 30 | – | 0 | .455 |
† – Conference champion ‡ – Tournament champion y – Invited to the NCAA Tournament; As of June 11, 2024; Rankings from NFCA/USA Today

The 2024 Oklahoma Sooners softball team was an American college softball team that represented the University of Oklahoma during the 2024 NCAA Division I softball season. The Sooners were led by Patty Gasso in her thirtieth season, and played their home games at Love's Field as a member of the Big 12 Conference. This was the Sooners' first season at Love's Field. The Sooners won the 2024 Women's College World Series, becoming the first team in college softball history to four-peat.

This season was the team's last as members of the Big 12 Conference before joining the SEC on July 1, 2024.

== Previous season ==
The Sooners finished the 2023 season 61–1 overall, and 18–0 in the Big 12, finishing in first place in their conference. Following the conclusion of the regular season, the Sooners won the 2023 Big 12 Conference softball tournament and received an automatic bid to the 2023 NCAA Division I softball tournament, where they were the No. 1 overall seed. They won the 2023 Women's College World Series over Florida State.

== Preseason ==
On July 5, 2023, Oklahoma announced the return of former Oklahoma player Falepolima Aviu to the staff as an assistant coach.

== Offseason ==
=== Departures ===
Oklahoma outgoing transfers
| Player | Position | Year | New team | Ref |
|---|---|---|---|---|
| Jordy Bahl | Pitcher | Junior | Nebraska | |
| Jocelyn Erickson | Catcher | Sophomore | Florida | |
| Sophia Nugent | Utility | Junior | Tennessee | |

=== Additions ===
Oklahoma incoming transfers
| Player | Position | Year | Previous team | Ref |
|---|---|---|---|---|
| Karlie Keeney | Pitcher | Redshirt senior | Liberty | |
| Riley Ludlam | Utility | Redshirt senior | Furman | |
| Kelly Maxwell | Pitcher | Redshirt senior | Oklahoma State | |
| Paytn Monticelli | Pitcher | Sophomore | Wisconsin | |

== Roster and personnel ==
2024 Oklahoma Sooners roster
| Pitchers: 8 – Karlie Keeney – Senior; 11 – Kierston Deal – Sophomore; 17 – Paytn Monticelli – Sophomore; 19 – Nicole May – Senior; 28 – Kelly Maxwell – Redshirt Senior; 85 – SJ Geurin – Redshirt Freshman; Catchers: 9 – Kinzie Hansen – Senior; Outfielders: 0 – Rylie Boone – Senior; 12 – Maya Bland – Freshman; 24 – Jayda Coleman – Senior; 27 – Hannah Coor – Redshirt Sophomore | Infielders: 1 – Cydney Sanders – Junior; 2 – Nelly McEnroe-Marinas – Freshman; 23 – Tiare Jennings – Senior; 82 – Avery Hodge – Sophomore; Utility: 5 – Ella Parker – Freshman; 7 – Kasidi Pickering – Freshman; 30 – Riley Ludlam – Senior; 33 – Alyssa Brito – Senior; 40 – Alynah Torres – Senior; 43 – Quincee Lilio – Redshirt Sophomore |

2024 Oklahoma Sooners coaching staff
- Patty Gasso – Head coach
- Jennifer Rocha – Associate head coach
- JT Gasso – Associate head coach
- Falepolima Steele – Assistant coach
- Ryan Wondrasek – Director of player development
- Lauren Foster – Graduate assistant

== Schedule ==
2024 Oklahoma Sooners softball game log
Regular season (46–6)

February (14–0)
| Date | Opponent | Rank | Site | Score | Win | Loss | Save | Attendance | Overall Record | Big 12 Record |
|---|---|---|---|---|---|---|---|---|---|---|
| February 8 | vs. Utah Valley; Puerto Vallarta College Challenge | No. 1 | Nancy Almaraz Stadium; Puerto Vallarta, Jal. | 13–0 ^{(5)} | **May** (1–0) | Morris (0–1) | — | 700 | 1–0 | – |
| February 8 | vs. No. 11 Duke; Puerto Vallarta College Challenge | No. 1 | Nancy Almaraz Stadium | 3–0 | **Maxwell** (1–0) | Curd (0–1) | **Keeney** (1) | 800 | 2–0 | – |
| February 9 | vs. No. 7 Washington; Puerto Vallarta College Challenge | No. 1 | Nancy Almaraz Stadium | 4–3 ^{(8)} | **Maxwell** (2–0) | Meylan (1–1) | — | 700 | 3–0 | – |
| February 10 | vs. Long Beach State; Puerto Vallarta College Challenge | No. 1 | Nancy Almaraz Stadium | 11–3 | **Keeney** (1–0) | Fernandez (0–1) | — | 550 | 4–0 | – |
| February 16 | vs. Central Arkansas; Cowgirl Challenge | No. 1 | Joe Miller Field at Cowgirl Diamond; Lake Charles, LA | 9–0 ^{(5)} | **May** (2–0) | Petty (0–2) | — | 1,542 | 5–0 | – |
| February 16 | at McNeese; Cowgirl Challenge | No. 1 | Joe Miller Field at Cowgirl Diamond | 8–1 | **Maxwell** (3–0) | Davis (1–1) | — | 1,542 | 6–0 | – |
| February 17 | vs. Lamar; Cowgirl Challenge | No. 1 | Joe Miller Field at Cowgirl Diamond | 8–0 ^{(5)} | **Deal** (1–0) | Guidry (0–1) | — | 1,559 | 7–0 | – |
| February 17 | at McNeese; Cowgirl Challenge | No. 1 | Joe Miller Field at Cowgirl Diamond | 3–0 | **May** (3–0) | Davis (1–2) | **Maxwell** (1) | 1,559 | 8–0 | – |
| February 18 | vs. Central Arkansas; Cowgirl Challenge | No. 1 | Joe Miller Field at Cowgirl Diamond | 8–0 ^{(5)} | **Geurin** (1–0) | Runner (2–3) | — | — | 9–0 | – |
| February 23 | vs. No. 25 Mississippi State; Mary Nutter Collegiate Classic | No. 1 | Big League Dreams Complex; Cathedral City, CA | 9–3 | **May** (4–0) | Wesley (4–1) | — | 2,097 | 10–0 | – |
| February 23 | vs. Wisconsin; Mary Nutter Collegiate Classic | No. 1 | Big League Dreams Complex | 10–2 ^{(5)} | **Maxwell** (4–0) | Jacobson (0–5) | — | 1,656 | 11–0 | – |
| February 24 | vs. San Diego State; Mary Nutter Collegiate Classic | No. 1 | Big League Dreams Complex | 7–0 | **Deal** (2–0) | Light (4–2) | — | 1,923 | 12–0 | – |
| February 25 | vs. Notre Dame; Mary Nutter Collegiate Classic | No. 1 | Big League Dreams Complex | 8–0 ^{(6)} | **Keeney** (2–0) | Madrigal (2–4) | — | 1,672 | 13–0 | – |
| February 25 | vs. Loyola Marymount; Mary Nutter Collegiate Classic | No. 1 | Big League Dreams Complex | 9–0 ^{(5)} | **May** (5–0) | Hubbard (1–2) | — | 1,876 | 14–0 | – |

March (20–1)
| Date | Opponent | Rank | Site | Score | Win | Loss | Save | Attendance | Overall Record | Big 12 Record |
|---|---|---|---|---|---|---|---|---|---|---|
| March 1 | vs. Miami; Oklahoma Tournament | No. 1 | Love's Field; Norman, OK | 9–7 | **Geurin** (2–0) | Jarvis (4–1) | — | 4,450 | 15–0 | – |
| March 1 | vs. Liberty; Oklahoma Tournament | No. 1 | Love's Field | 8–0 ^{(5)} | **Maxwell** (5–0) | Yoder (2–3) | — | 4,450 | 16–0 | – |
| March 2 | vs. Louisiana; Oklahoma Tournament | No. 1 | Love's Field | 8–0 ^{(5)} | **Deal** (3–0) | Loecker (0–2) | — | 4,450 | 17–0 | – |
| March 2 | vs. Liberty; Oklahoma Tournament | No. 1 | Love's Field | 15–3 ^{(5)} | **May** (6–0) | Love (0–3) | — | 4,450 | 18–0 | – |
| March 3 | vs. Louisiana; Oklahoma Tournament | No. 1 | Love's Field | 5–7 ^{(8)} | Riassetto (4–2) | **Keeney** (2–1) | — | 4,450 | 18–1 | – |
| March 6 | Texas A&M–Commerce | No. 1 | Love's Field | 9–0 ^{(5)} | **Deal** (4–0) | Muller (2–8) | — | 3,945 | 19–1 | – |
| March 9 | Iowa State | No. 1 | Love's Field | 4–0 | **Maxwell** (6–0) | Schurman (1–2) | — | 4,386 | 20–1 | 1–0 |
| March 9 | Iowa State | No. 1 | Love's Field | 11–2 ^{(5)} | **May** (7–0) | Charles (1–4) | — | 4,192 | 21–1 | 2–0 |
| March 10 | Iowa State | No. 1 | Love's Field | 14–1 ^{(5)} | **Deal** (5–0) | Rodriguez (2–3) | — | 4,284 | 22–1 | 3–0 |
| March 12 | Tarleton State | No. 1 | Love's Field | 8–0 ^{(5)} | **Maxwell** (7–0) | Rehmeier (3–3) | — | 4,226 | 23–1 | – |
| March 12 | Tarleton State | No. 1 | Love's Field | 12–1 ^{(5)} | **May** (8–0) | Blincoe (4–3) | — | 4,226 | 24–1 | – |
| March 15 | at Texas Tech | No. 1 | Rocky Johnson Field; Lubbock, TX | 14–0 | **Maxell** (8–0) | Wright (6–3) | — | 1,056 | 25–1 | 4–0 |
| March 16 | at Texas Tech | No. 1 | Rocky Johnson Field | 15–2 ^{(5)} | **Deal** (6–0) | Kuehl (7–4) | — | 1,093 | 26–1 | 5–0 |
| March 17 | at Texas Tech | No. 1 | Rocky Johnson Field | 11–1 | **May** (9–0) | Wright (6–4) | — | 954 | 27–1 | 6–0 |
| March 20 | UT Arlington | No. 1 | Love's Field | 12–1 ^{(5)} | **Keeney** (3–1) | Moreno (3–4) | — | 4,357 | 28–1 | – |
| March 22 | vs. No. 22 Baylor | No. 1 | USA Softball Hall of Fame Stadium; Oklahoma City, OK | 8–1 | **Maxwell** (9–0) | Crandall (7–3) | — | 8,798 | 29–1 | 7–0 |
| March 23 | No. 22 Baylor | No. 1 | Love's Field | 12–3 ^{(5)} | **May** (10–0) | Binford (5–6) | — | 4,520 | 30–1 | 8–0 |
| March 23 | No. 22 Baylor | No. 1 | Love's Field | 7–4 | **Deal** (7–0) | Crandall (7–4) | — | 4,151 | 31–1 | 9–0 |
| March 28 | at Kansas | No. 1 | Arrocha Ballpark; Lawrence, KS | 6–1 | **Maxwell** (10–0) | Hamilton (9–6) | — | 1,152 | 32–1 | 10–0 |
| March 29 | at Kansas | No. 1 | Arrocha Ballpark | 17–0 ^{(5)} | **May** (11–0) | Brooks (10–3) | — | 1,145 | 33–1 | 11–0 |
| March 30 | at Kansas | No. 1 | Arrocha Ballpark | 7–3 | **Kenney** (4–1) | Hamilton (9–7) | — | 1,152 | 34–1 | 12–0 |

April (11–3)
| Date | Opponent | Rank | Site | Score | Win | Loss | Save | Attendance | Overall Record | Big 12 Record |
|---|---|---|---|---|---|---|---|---|---|---|
| April 5 | at No. 4 Texas | No. 1 | Red and Charline McCombs Field; Austin, TX | 5–2 | **Maxwell** (11–0) | Morgan (8–1) | — | 1,812 | 35–1 | 13–0 |
| April 6 | at No. 4 Texas | No. 1 | Red and Charline McCombs Field | 1–2 | Gutierrez (7–0) | **May** (11–1) | — | 2,084 | 35–2 | 13–1 |
| April 7 | at No. 4 Texas | No. 1 | Red and Charline McCombs Field | 1–2 | Czech (5–3) | **Maxwell** (11–1) | — | 1,922 | 35–3 | 13–2 |
| April 9 | at Wichita State | No. 1 | Wilkins Stadium; Wichita, KS | 7–0 | **Deal** (8–0) | Howell (3–3) | — | 934 | 36–3 | – |
| April 11 | BYU | No. 1 | Love's Field | 8–0 ^{(5)} | **Maxwell** (12–1) | Temples (6–6) | — | 4,003 | 37–3 | 14–2 |
| April 12 | BYU | No. 1 | Love's Field | 4–9 | Agbayani (3–0) | **Deal** (8–1) | Dahle (3) | 4,385 | 37–4 | 14–3 |
| April 13 | BYU | No. 1 | Love's Field | 7–3 | **Maxwell** (13–1) | Agbayani (3–1) | — | 4,509 | 38–4 | 15–3 |
| April 16 | vs. Tulsa | No. 2 | USA Softball Hall of Fame Stadium | 8–0 ^{(6)} | **Deal** (9–1) | Nash (9–3) | — | 4,908 | 39–4 | – |
| April 19 | Houston | No. 2 | Love's Field | 8–0 ^{(6)} | **Maxwell** (14–1) | Edwards (3–2) | — | 4,292 | 40–4 | 16–3 |
| April 20 | Houston | No. 2 | Love's Field | 10–2 ^{(5)} | **May** (12–1) | Smith (10–10) | — | 4,506 | 41–4 | 17–3 |
| April 21 | Houston | No. 2 | Love's Field | 5–0 | **Deal** (10–1) | Waiters (4–4) | — | 4,177 | 42–4 | 18–3 |
| April 26 | at UCF | No. 2 | UCF Softball Complex; Orlando, FL | 10–2 | **Maxwell** (15–1) | Felton (10–5) | — | 842 | 43–4 | 19–3 |
| April 27 | at UCF | No. 2 | UCF Softball Complex | 2–1 | **Deal** (11–1) | Willis (8–8) | — | 833 | 44–4 | 20–3 |
| April 28 | at UCF | No. 2 | UCF Softball Complex | 11–7 | **Maxwell** (16–1) | DeVoe (2–2) | — | 834 | 45–4 | 21–3 |

May (1–2)
| Date | Opponent | Rank | Site | Score | Win | Loss | Save | Attendance | Overall Record | Big 12 Record |
|---|---|---|---|---|---|---|---|---|---|---|
| May 3 | No. 4 Oklahoma State | No. 2 | Love's Field | 3–6 | Kilfoyl (20–3) | **Maxwell** (16–2) | — | 4,538 | 45–5 | 21–4 |
| May 4 | No. 4 Oklahoma State | No. 2 | Love's Field | 2–6 | Kilfoyl (21–3) | **May** (12–2) | — | 4,534 | 45–6 | 21–5 |
| May 5 | No. 4 Oklahoma State | No. 2 | Love's Field | 8–2 | **Keeney** (5–1) | Aycock (7–3) | — | 4,528 | 46–6 | 22–5 |

Postseason (13–1)

Big 12 tournament (3–0)
| Date | Opponent | Rank | Site | Score | Win | Loss | Save | Attendance | Overall Record | B12T Record |
|---|---|---|---|---|---|---|---|---|---|---|
| May 9 | Kansas | No. 4 | Devon Park | 10–1 ^{(5)} | **Maxwell** (17–2) | Ludwig (0–3) | — | 3,191 | 47–6 | 1–0 |
| May 10 | BYU | No. 4 | Devon Park | 13–2 ^{(5)} | **Deal** (12–1) | Mares (7–9) | — | — | 48–6 | 2–0 |
| May 11 | No. 1 Texas | No. 4 | Devon Park | 5–1 | **Maxwell** (18–2) | Gutierrez (10–1) | **May** (1) | 4,003 | 49–6 | 3–0 |

Norman Regional (3–0)
| Date | Opponent | Rank | Site/Stadium | Score | Win | Loss | Save | Attendance | Overall Record | Regional Record |
|---|---|---|---|---|---|---|---|---|---|---|
| May 17 | vs. Cleveland State | No. 2 | Love's Field | 9–0 ^{(6)} | **May** (13–2) | Holzopfel (19–10) | — | 4,153 | 50–6 | 1–0 |
| May 18 | vs. Oregon | No. 2 | Love's Field | 6–3 | **Maxwell** (19–2) | Scott (9–9) | — | 4,446 | 51–6 | 2–0 |
| May 19 | vs. Oregon | No. 2 | Love's Field | 3–2 | **May** (14–2) | Spencer (7–4) | **Maxwell** (2) | 4,277 | 52–6 | 3–0 |

Norman Super Regional (2–0)
| Date | Opponent | Rank | Site/Stadium | Score | Win | Loss | Save | Attendance | Overall Record | Super Reg. Record |
|---|---|---|---|---|---|---|---|---|---|---|
| May 23 | vs. No. 12 Florida State | No. 2 | Love's Field | 11–3 ^{(5)} | **Maxwell** (20–2) | Danley (18–6) | — | 4,189 | 53–6 | 1–0 |
| May 24 | vs. No. 12 Florida State | No. 2 | Love's Field | 4–2 | **Keeney** (6–1) | Gooden (5–2) | **May** (2) | 4,510 | 54–6 | 2–0 |

Women's College World Series (5–1)
| Date | Opponent | Rank | Site/stadium | Score | Win | Loss | Save | Attendance | Overall Record | WCWS Record |
|---|---|---|---|---|---|---|---|---|---|---|
| May 30 | vs. No. 4 Duke | No. 2 | Devon Park | 9–1 ^{(6)} | **Deal** (13–1) | Wright (19–3) | — | 12,445 | 55–6 | 1–0 |
| June 1 | vs. No. 6 UCLA | No. 2 | Devon Park | 1–0 | **Maxwell** (21–2) | Terry (21–2) | — | — | 56–6 | 2–0 |
| June 3 | vs. No. 7 Florida | No. 2 | Devon Park | 3–9 | Rothrock (33–8) | **May** (14–3) | — | — | 56–7 | 2–1 |
| June 4 | vs. No. 7 Florida | No. 2 | Devon Park | 6–5 ^{(8)} | **Maxwell** (22–2) | Rothrock (33–9) | — | 11,166 | 57–7 | 3–1 |
| June 5 | vs. No. 1 Texas | No. 2 | Devon Park | 8–3 | **Maxwell** (23–2) | Kavan (20–3) | — | 12,317 | 58–7 | 4–1 |
| June 6 | vs. No. 1 Texas | No. 2 | Devon Park | 8–4 | **Deal** (14–1) | Czech (8–4) | **Maxwell** (3) | 12,324 | 59–7 | 5–1 |

- Win
- Loss
- Postponement
- Bold: Sooners team member
- Rankings from NFCA:
- (#) Tournament seedings in parentheses.

== Rankings ==
Ranking movements Legend: ██ Increase in ranking ██ Decrease in ranking
| | Week | | | | | | | | | | | | | | | |
| Poll | Pre | 1 | 2 | 3 | 4 | 5 | 6 | 7 | 8 | 9 | 10 | 11 | 12 | 13 | 14 | Final |
|---|---|---|---|---|---|---|---|---|---|---|---|---|---|---|---|---|
| NFCA / USA Today | 1 | 1 | 1 | 1 | 1 | 1 | 1 | 1 | 1 | 1 | 2 | 2 | 2 | 4 | 2 | 1 |
| Softball America | 1 | 1 | 1 | 1 | 1 | 1 | 1 | 1 | 1 | 2 | 2 | 2 | 2 | 4 | 4 | 1 |
| ESPN.com/USA Softball | 1 | 1 | 1 | 1 | 2 | 1 | 1 | 1 | 1 | 2 | 2 | 2 | 2 | 4 | 2 | 1 |
| D1Softball | 1 | 1 | 1 | 1 | 2 | 1 | 1 | 1 | 1 | 2 | 2 | 2 | 2 | 4 | 4 | 1 |
