= 2024 Texas Longhorns softball team =

2024 Texas Longhorns softball

Big 12 regular season champion NCAA Austin Regional champion NCAA Austin Super Regional champion

Women's College World Series, runner-up
- Conference: Big 12 Conference

Ranking
- Coaches: No. 2
- Record: 55–10 (23–4 Big 12)
- Head coach: Mike White (6th season)
- Assistant coaches: Steve Singleton (5th season); Kristen Zaleski (2nd season); Patti Ruth Taylor (1st season)
- Home stadium: Red and Charline McCombs Field

2024 Big 12 Conference softball standings
	Conf.						Overall
Team	W		L		T	PCT	W		L		T	PCT
No. 2 Texas ‍†‍‍^{y}	23	–	4	–	0	.852	55	–	10	–	0	.846
No. 1 Oklahoma ‍‍‡‍^{y}	22	–	5	–	0	.815	59	–	7	–	0	.894
No. 6 Oklahoma State ‍‍‍^{y}	21	–	6	–	0	.778	49	–	12	–	0	.803
Baylor ‍‍‍^{y}	14	–	13	–	0	.519	36	–	23	–	0	.610
UCF ‍‍‍^{y}	12	–	15	–	0	.444	31	–	25	–	0	.554
BYU ‍‍‍	11	–	16	–	0	.407	31	–	23	–	0	.574
Kansas ‍‍‍	11	–	16	–	0	.407	28	–	25	–	1	.528
Texas Tech ‍‍‍	8	–	16	–	0	.333	29	–	21	–	0	.580
Iowa State ‍‍‍	6	–	18	–	0	.250	20	–	31	–	0	.392
Houston ‍‍‍	4	–	23	–	0	.148	25	–	30	–	0	.455
† – Conference champion ‡ – Tournament champion y – Invited to the NCAA Tournament; As of June 11, 2024; Rankings from NFCA/USA Today

The 2024 Texas Longhorns softball team represented the University of Texas at Austin during the 2024 NCAA Division I softball season. The Longhorns played their home games at Red and Charline McCombs Field as a member of the Big 12 Conference. They were led by head coach Mike White in his sixth season at Texas.

== Previous season ==
Texas finished the 2023 season 45–15–1 overall and 11–7 in Big 12 Conference play. They were defeated in the Super Regional by Tennessee.

== Personnel ==
=== Roster ===
2024 Texas Longhorns Roster
Pitchers: 17 – Teagan Kavan – freshman; 22 – Estelle Czech – senior; 55 – Mac Morgan – junior; 77 – Citlaly Gutierrez – sophomore; 99 – Sophia Simpson – junior	Catchers: 14 – Reese Atwood (Note: Plays two different positions) – sophomore; 20 – Katie Stewart – freshman; 44 – Katie Cimusz – junior; Infielders: 9 – Joley Mitchell – senior; 10 – Mia Scott – junior; 11 – Alyssa Washington – senior; 12 – Victoria Hunter – freshman; 14 – Reese Atwood – sophomore; 20 – Katie Stewart – freshman; 23 – Viviana Martinez – sophomore; 25 – Ryan Brown – freshman; 43 – Leighann Goode – sophomore; 44 – Katie Cimusz – junior	Outfielders: 4 – Adayah Wallace – freshman; 5 – Jordyn Whitaker – senior; 6 – Bella Dayton – senior; 7 – Ashton Maloney - (redshirt) sophomore; 21 – Kayden Henry – freshman; Utility Players: 3 – Vanessa Quiroga – junior; 27 – Baylea Brandon – junior; Designated Hitters: 5 – Jordyn Whitaker – senior

Roster Notes

=== Coaches ===
2024 Texas Longhorns coaching staff
- Mike White – Head coach – 6th year
- Steve Singleton – Associate head coach – 5th year
- Kristen Zaleski – Assistant coach – 2nd year
- Patti Ruth Taylor – Assistant coach – 1st year

=== Support staff ===
2024 Texas Longhorns support staff
- Keely McMillon – Director of operations – 4th year
- Melissa Schmitz – Assistant coach for athletic performance – 8th year
- Nick Williams – Video coordinator
- Raiza Aguilar – Associate athletic trainer (Softball) – 1st year

== Offseason ==
=== Player departures ===
2024 Texas offseason departures
Name	Number	Pos.	Height	Year	Hometown	Notes
Lou Gilbert	9	OF	5'7”	Senior	Kansas City, MO	Graduated
Mya Holmes	1	OF	5'11”	Sophomore	Texas City, TX	Departed Team

Outgoing transfers

Name	B/T	Pos.	Height	Hometown	Year	New school	Source
Alyssa Popelka	L/R	OF	5’6”	Austin, TX	Junior	Washington	
Camille Corona	L/R	UTL	5’4”	Dripping Springs, TX	Junior	UT Arlington	
Courtney Day	R/R	1B	5’10”	Pearland, TX	Junior	Ole Miss	
Maddie Pomykalski	R/R	UTL	5'9”	Frankfort, IL	Freshman	Arizona State	

=== Coaching staff departures ===
Name	Position	New Team	New Position	Source
Molly Jacobsen	Assistant Coach	Missouri	Assistant Coach	

=== Incoming players ===
2023 Texas Signing Class
Name	B/T	Number	Pos.	Hometown	High School	Source
Adayah Wallace	R/L	4	OF	Plano, TX	Plano West Senior	
Katie Stewart	R/R	20	C/IF	Frankfort, IL	Lincoln-Way East	
Kayden Henry	R/L	21	OF	Texas City, TX	Dickinson	
Ryan Brown	R/R	25	IF	Thompson's Station, TN	Independence	
Teagan Kavan	R/R	17	P	West Des Moines, IA	Dowling Catholic	
Victoria Hunter	R/R	12	IF	Houston, TX	St. Pius X	

Incoming transfers

Name	B/T	Pos.	Height	Hometown	Year	Previous school	Source
Joley Mitchell	R/R	IF	5’9”	Rose Bud, AR	Senior	Notre Dame	

=== Coaching staff additions ===
Name	Position	Previous Team	Previous Position	Source
Pattie Ruth Taylor	Assistant Coach	Lehigh	Assistant Coach	

== Schedule and results ==
2024 Texas Longhorns softball game log (55–10)
Legend: = Win = Loss = Tie = Canceled Bold = Texas team member
Regular season (45–6)

February (13–1)
Date	Time (CT)	TV	Opponent	Rank	Stadium	Score	Win	Loss	Save	Attendance	Overall Record	Big 12 Record	Box Score	Recap
Stacy Winsberg Tournament
February 9	2:30 PM	N/A	vs. San Diego*	No. 8	Easton Stadium • Los Angeles, CA	19–0 ^{(5)}	**Morgan** (1–0)	Rose (0–1)	-	150	1–0	-	Box Score	Recap
February 9	8:00 PM	ESPN	at No. 10 UCLA*	No. 8	Easton Stadium • Los Angeles, CA	3–2	**Kavan** (1–0)	Tinsley (0–1)	**Gutierrez** (1)	1,158	2–0	-	Box Score	Recap
Mark Campbell Invitational
February 10	5:00 PM	FloSoftball	vs. San Diego*	No. 8	Bill Barber Park • Irvine, CA	16–1 ^{(5)}	**Czech** (1–0)	Rose (0–2)	-	748	3–0	-	Box Score	Recap
February 10	8:00 PM	FloSoftball	vs. No. 10 UCLA*	No. 8	Bill Barber Park • Irvine, CA	16–0 ^{(5)}	**Gutierrez** (1–0)	Cecil (1–1)	-	850	4–0	-	Box Score	Recap
February 11	2:00 PM	ESPN+	at LMU*	No. 8	Smith Field • Los Angeles, CA	10–2 ^{(6)}	**Kavan** (2–0)	O'Dell (1–1)	-	131	5–0	-	Box Score	Recap
Shriners Children's Clearwater Invitational
February 16	5:00 PM	LHN	vs. No. 2 Tennessee*	No. 3	Eddie C. Moore Complex • Clearwater, FL	2–1	**Gutierrez** (2–0)	Pickens (2–1)	-		6–0	-	Box Score	Recap
February 16	8:00 PM	ESPN2	vs. No. 9 Stanford*	No. 3	Eddie C. Moore Complex • Clearwater, FL	9–2	**Kavan** (3–0)	Chung (0–1)	-		7–0	-	Box Score	Recap
February 17	1:00 PM	ESPN+	vs. North Carolina*	No. 3	Eddie C. Moore Complex • Clearwater, FL	Canceled due to inclement weather.								
February 17	6:00 PM	LHN	vs. No. 18 Kentucky*	No. 3	Eddie C. Moore Complex • Clearwater, FL	Canceled due to inclement weather.								
February 18	9:00 AM	ESPN2	vs. No. 22 Northwestern*	No. 3	Eddie C. Moore Complex • Clearwater, FL	Canceled due to inclement weather.								
February 21	5:00 PM	LHN	Houston Christian*	No. 2	Red & Charline McCombs Field • Austin, TX	14–1 ^{(5)}	**Czech** (2–0)	Grofman (2–1)	-	1,694	8–0	-	Box Score	Recap
Lone Star State Invitational
February 23	4:00 PM	LHN	Louisiana*	No. 2	Red & Charline McCombs Field • Austin, TX	5–0	**Kavan** (4–0)	Riassetto (3–1)	-	1,848	9–0	-	Box Score	Recap
February 23	6:30 PM	LHN	Colorado State*	No. 2	Red & Charline McCombs Field • Austin, TX	7–0	**Morgan** (2–0)	Serna (3–2)	-	1,959	10–0	-	Box Score	Recap
February 24	4:30 PM	LHN	Colorado State*	No. 2	Red & Charline McCombs Field • Austin, TX	9–0^{(5)}	**Kavan** (5–0)	Hornbuckle (4–3)	-	1,983	11–0	-	Box Score	Recap
February 24	7:00 PM	LHN	No. 13 Stanford*	No. 2	Red & Charline McCombs Field • Austin, TX	3–4^{(8)}	Canady (4–2)	**Czech** (3–1)	-	1,986	11–1	-	Box Score	Recap
February 25	12:30 PM	LHN	Louisiana*	No. 2	Red & Charline McCombs Field • Austin, TX	5–4	**Morgan** (3–0)	Loecker (0–1)	**Kavan** (1)	1,945	12–1	-	Box Score	Recap
February 28	6:00 PM	N/A	at Texas State*	No. 2	Bobcat Softball Stadium • San Marcos, TX	1–0	**Kavan** (6–0)	Mullins (7–2)	-	1,191	13–1	-	Box Score	Recap

March (16–4)
Date	Time (CT)	TV	Opponent	Rank	Stadium	Score	Win	Loss	Save	Attendance	Overall Record	Big 12 Record	Box Score	Recap
Longhorn Invitational
March 1	3:00 PM	LHN	Northwestern State*	No. 2	Red & Charline McCombs Field • Austin, TX	10–2 ^{(5)}	**Morgan** (4–0)	Seely (4–5)	-	1,812	14–1	-	Box Score	Recap
March 1	5:30 PM	LHN	Tarleton State*	No. 2	Red & Charline McCombs Field • Austin, TX	17–0 ^{(5)}	**Gutierrez** (3–0)	Rehmeier (3–1)	-	1,812	15–1	-	Box Score	Recap
March 2	3:00 PM	LHN	Hofstra*	No. 2	Red & Charline McCombs Field • Austin, TX	13–0 ^{(5)}	**Kavan** (7–0)	Ogden (0–4)	-	1,812	16–1	-	Box Score	Recap
March 3	10:00 AM	LHN	Hofstra*	No. 2	Red & Charline McCombs Field • Austin, TX	4–0	**Gutierrez** (4–0)	Apsel (1–3)	-	1,812	17–1	-	Box Score	Recap
March 4	5:00 PM	LHN	Penn State*	No. 2	Red & Charline McCombs Field • Austin, TX	7–1	**Kavan** (8–0)	Volpe (5–1)	-	1,812	18–1	-	Box Score	Recap
March 6	6:00 PM	LHN	UTA*	No. 2	Red & Charline McCombs Field • Austin, TX	8–1	**Czech** (2–1)	Bumpurs (0–6)	**Simpson** (1)	1,792	19–1	-	Box Score	Recap
March 8	6:00 PM	ESPN+	at Houston	No. 2	Cougar Softball Stadium • Houston, TX	10–12	Smith (9–2)	**Czech** (2–2)	Lehman (2)	1,266	19–2	0–1	Box Score	Recap
March 9	2:00 PM	ESPN+	at Houston	No. 2	Cougar Softball Stadium • Houston, TX	9–2	**Kavan** (9–0)	Waiters (3–3)	-	1,268	20–2	1–1	Box Score	Recap
March 10	12:00 PM	ESPN+	at Houston	No. 2	Cougar Softball Stadium • Houston, TX	8–6	**Kavan** (10–0)	Lehman (4–1)	-	1,276	21–2	2–1	Box Score	Recap
March 12	11:00 AM	SECN	at No. 2 LSU*	No. 3	Tiger Park • Baton Rouge, LA	4–7	Berzon (9–0)	**Kavan** (10–1)	-	2,844	21–3	2–1	Box Score	Recap
March 14	6:00 PM	LHN	BYU	No. 3	Red & Charline McCombs Field • Austin, TX	13–0 ^{(5)}	**Morgan** (5–0)	Dahle (4–3)	-	1,812	22–3	3–1	Box Score	Recap
March 15	11:30 AM	LHN	BYU	No. 3	Red & Charline McCombs Field • Austin, TX	7–3	**Morgan** (6–0)	Mares (4–3)	-	1,812	23–3	4–1	Box Score	Recap
March 15 (Note: Game originally scheduled for March 16, but moved up a day due to incoming inclement weather.)	2:30 PM	LHN	BYU	No. 3	Red & Charline McCombs Field • Austin, TX	10–0 ^{(5)}	**Gutierrez** (5–0)	Dahle (4–4)	-	1,812	24–3	5–1	Box Score	Recap
March 20	7:00 PM	ACCN	at No. 17 Florida State*	No. 3	JoAnne Graf Field at the Seminole Softball Complex • Tallahassee, FL	10–0 ^{(6)}	**Morgan** (7–0)	Reid (5–1)	-	1,413	25–3	5–1	Box Score	Recap
March 22	5:00 PM	ESPN+	at UCF	No. 3	UCF Softball Complex • Orlando, FL	5–0	**Kavan** (11–1)	Felton (6–3)	-	665	26–3	6–1	Box Score	Recap
March 23	1:00 PM	ESPN+	at UCF	No. 3	UCF Softball Complex • Orlando, FL	4–2	**Czech** (4–2)	Jewell (2–2)	-	671	27–3	7–1	Box Score	Recap
March 24	11:00 AM	ESPN+	at UCF	No. 3	UCF Softball Complex • Orlando, FL	3–1	**Morgan** (8–0)	Halajian (1–2)	**Kavan** (2)	659	28–3	8–1	Box Score	Recap
March 28	6:00 PM	ESPN+	at No. 8 Oklahoma State	No. 2	Cowgirl Stadium • Stillwater, OK	0–5	Kilfoyl (12–2)	**Kavan** (11–2)	-	1,250	28–4	8–2	Box Score	Recap
March 29	2:00 PM	ESPN2	at No. 8 Oklahoma State	No. 2	Cowgirl Stadium • Stillwater, OK	2–1	**Gutierrez** (6–0)	Rosenberry (8–3)	-	1,605	29–4	9–2	Box Score	Recap
March 30	12:00 PM	ESPN+	at No. 8 Oklahoma State	No. 2	Cowgirl Stadium • Stillwater, OK	0–3	Kilfoyl (13–2)	**Czech** (4–3)	-	1,757	29–5	9–3	Box Score	Recap

April (13–1)
Date	Time (CT)	TV	Opponent	Rank	Stadium	Score	Win	Loss	Save	Attendance	Overall Record	Big 12 Record	Box Score	Recap
April 5	5:30 PM	ESPNU	No. 1 Oklahoma	No. 4	Red & Charline McCombs Field • Austin, TX	2–5	Maxwell (11–0)	**Morgan** (8–1)	-	1,812	29–6	9–4	Box Score	Recap
April 6	7:00 PM	ESPN	No. 1 Oklahoma	No. 4	Red & Charline McCombs Field • Austin, TX	2–1	**Gutierrez** (7–0)	May (11–1)	-	2,084	30–6	10–4	Box Score	Recap
April 7	1:00 PM	LHN	No. 1 Oklahoma	No. 4	Red & Charline McCombs Field • Austin, TX	2–1	**Czech** (5–3)	Maxwell (11–1)	-	1,922	31–6	11–4	Box Score	Recap
April 10	4:30 PM	LHN	No. 25 Texas State*	No. 2	Red & Charline McCombs Field • Austin, TX	6–4	**Czech** (6–3)	Mullins (21–5)	-	1,594	32–6	11–4	Box Score	Recap
April 12	6:30 PM	ESPN+	at Baylor	No. 2	Getterman Stadium • Waco, TX	14–1 ^{(6)}	**Kavan** (12–2)	Crandall (11–6)	-	1,250	33–6	12–4	Box Score	Recap
April 13	1:30 PM	ESPN2	Baylor	No. 2	Red & Charline McCombs Field • Austin, TX	9–6	**Czech** (7–3)	Binford (6–9)	**Morgan** (1)	1,832	34–6	13–4	Box Score	Recap
April 14	1:00 PM	LHN	Baylor	No. 2	Red & Charline McCombs Field • Austin, TX	9–5	**Morgan** (9–1)	Crandall (11–7)	**Kavan** (3)	1,812	35–6	14–4	Box Score	Recap
April 19	5:00 PM	ESPN+	at Kansas	No. 1	Arrocha Ballpark at Rock Chalk Park • Lawrence, KS	4–2	**Kavan** (13–3)	Ludwig (0–1)	**Morgan** (2)	1,188	36–6	15–4	Box Score	Recap
April 20	2:00 PM	ESPN+	at Kansas	No. 1	Arrocha Ballpark • Lawrence, KS	11–3	**Morgan** (10–1)	Hamilton (10–11)	-	1,200	37–6	16–4	Box Score	Recap
April 21	12:00 PM	ESPN+	at Kansas	No. 1	Arrocha Ballpark • Lawrence, KS	7–0	**Gutierrez** (8–0)	Brooks (12–4)	-	1,039	38–6	17–4	Box Score	Recap
April 25	6:00 PM	LHN	Nicholls*	No. 1	Red & Charline McCombs Field • Austin, TX	10–3	**Czech** (8–3)	Paden (7–4)	**Simpson** (2)	1,625	39–6	17–4	Box Score	Recap
April 26	6:00 PM	LHN	Iowa State	No. 1	Red & Charline McCombs Field • Austin, TX	5–2	**Kavan** (14–2)	Ralston (4–7)	**Morgan** (3)	1,639	40–6	18–4	Box Score	Recap
April 27	1:00 PM	LHN	Iowa State	No. 1	Red & Charline McCombs Field • Austin, TX	8–0 ^{(5)}	**Gutierrez** (9–0)	Schurman (3–6)	-	1,812	41–6	19–4	Box Score	Recap
April 27	4:00 PM	LHN	Iowa State	No. 1	Red & Charline McCombs Field • Austin, TX	9–1 ^{(5)}	**Morgan** (11–1)	Charles (3–7)	-	1,738	42–6	20–4	Box Score	Recap

May (3–0)
Date	Time (CT)	TV	Opponent	Rank	Stadium	Score	Win	Loss	Save	Attendance	Overall Record	Big 12 Record	Box Score	Recap
May 3	6:30 PM	ESPN+	at Texas Tech	No. 1	Rocky Johnson Field • Lubbock, TX	13–3 ^{(5)}	**Kavan** (15–2)	Wright (9–8)	-	1,097	43–6	21–4	Box Score	Recap
May 4	1:00 PM	ESPN+	at Texas Tech	No. 1	Rocky Johnson Field • Lubbock, TX	23–0 ^{(5)}	**Gutierrez** (10–0)	Blackledge (0–3)	-	1,003	44–6	22–4	Box Score	Recap
May 5	12:00 PM	ESPN+	at Texas Tech	No. 1	Rocky Johnson Field • Lubbock, TX	14–4 ^{(5)}	**Kavan** (16–2)	Wright (9–9)	-	1,101	45–6	23–4	Box Score	Recap

Postseason (10–4)

Big 12 Softball Tournament (2–1)
Date	Time (CT)	TV	Opponent	Seed	Stadium	Score	Win	Loss	Save	Attendance	Overall Record	Tournament Record	Box Score	Recap
May 9	5:00 PM	ESPN+	vs. (8) Texas Tech; Quarterfinals	No. 1 (1)	Devon Park • Oklahoma City, OK	13–4 ^{(5)}	**Morgan** (12–1)	Wright (11–10)	-	3,044	46–6	1–0	Box Score	Recap
May 10	7:30 PM	ESPN+	vs. (4) Baylor; Semifinals	No. 1 (1)	Devon Park • Oklahoma City, OK	14–3 ^{(5)}	**Kavan** (17–2)	Crandall (14–8)	-	3,538	47–6	2–0	Box Score	Recap
May 11	6:30 PM	ESPN2	vs. No. 4 (2) Oklahoma; Championship	No. 1 (1)	Devon Park • Oklahoma City, OK	1–5	Maxwell (18–2)	**Gutierrez** (10–1)	May (1)	4,003	47–7	2–1	Box Score	Recap

NCAA Austin Regional (3–0)
Date	Time (CT)	TV	Opponent	Seed	Stadium	Score	Win	Loss	Save	Attendance	Overall record	Regional Record	Box Score	Recap
May 17	3:00 PM	LHN	vs. (4) Siena	No. 1 (1)	Red & Charline McCombs Field • Austin, TX	5–0	**Morgan** (13–1)	Eimont (20–9)	-	1,904	48–7	1–0	Box Score	Recap
May 18	12:00 PM	LHN	vs. (2) Northwestern	No. 1 (1)	Red & Charline McCombs Field • Austin, TX	14–2 ^{(5)}	**Gutierrez** (11–1)	Grudzielanek (7–2)	-	1,928	49–7	2–0	Box Score	Recap
May 19	12:00 PM	ESPN	vs. (2) Northwestern (Note: Texas was the designated Visiting Team.); Regional Final	No. 1 (1)	Red & Charline McCombs Field • Austin, TX	7–0	**Kavan** (18–2)	Miller (17–6)	-	1,841	50–7	3–0	Box Score	Recap

NCAA Austin Super Regional (2–1)
Date	Time (CT)	TV	Opponent	National Seed	Stadium	Score	Win	Loss	Save	Attendance	Overall record	Super Regional Record	Box Score	Recap
May 24	5:00 PM	ESPN2	vs. No. 9 (16) Texas A&M; Lone Star Showdown	No. 1 (1)	Red & Charline McCombs Field • Austin, TX	5–6	Kennedy (24–10)	**Gutierrez** (11–2)	-	1,976	50–8	0–1	Box Score	Recap
May 25	4:00 PM	ESPN	vs. No. 9 (16) Texas A&M (Note: Texas was the designated Visiting Team.)	No. 1 (1)	Red & Charline McCombs Field • Austin, TX	9–8 ^{(9)}	**Morgan** (14–1)	Kennedy (24–11)	-	2,011	51–8	1–1	Box Score	Recap
May 26	6:30 PM	ESPN2	vs. No. 9 (16) Texas A&M	No. 1 (1)	Red & Charline McCombs Field • Austin, TX	6–5	**Morgan** (15–1)	Ackerman (8–2)	**Kavan** (4)	2,214	52–8	2–1	Box Score	Recap

Women's College World Series (3–2)
Date	Time (CT)	TV	Opponent	National Seed	Stadium	Score	Win	Loss	Save	Attendance	Overall record	WCWS Record	Box Score	Recap
May 30	6:00 PM	ESPN2	vs. No. 8 (8) Stanford	No. 1 (1)	Devon Park • Oklahoma City, OK	4–0	**Kavan** (19–2)	Canady (22–6)	-	12,566	53–8	1–0	Box Score	Recap
June 1	6:00 PM	ESPN	vs. No. 7 (4) Florida	No. 1 (1)	Devon Park • Oklahoma City, OK	10–0 ^{(5)}	**Morgan** (16–1)	Rothrock (31–8)	-	12,565	54–8	2–0	Box Score	Recap
June 3	6:00 PM	ESPN	vs. No. 8 (8) Stanford (Note: Texas was the designated Visiting Team.)	No. 1 (1)	Devon Park • Oklahoma City, OK	1–0	**Kavan** (20–2)	Canady (24–7)	-	11,465	55–8	3–0	Box Score	Recap
June 5	7:00 PM	ESPN	vs. No. 2 (2) Oklahoma; Championship Series	No. 1 (1)	Devon Park • Oklahoma City, OK	3–8	Maxwell (23–2)	**Kavan** (20–3)	-	12,317	55–9	3–1	Box Score	Recap
June 6	7:00 PM	ESPN	vs. No. 2 (2) Oklahoma (Note: Texas was the designated Visiting Team.); Championship Series	No. 1 (1)	Devon Park • Oklahoma City, OK	4–8	Deal (14–1)	**Czech** (8–4)	Maxwell (3)	12,324	55–10	3–2	Box Score	Recap

Schedule Notes

== Awards, accomplishments, and honors ==
=== Conference honors ===
Conference honors
Honors	Player	Position	Ref.
Big 12 Player of the Year	Reese Atwood	C/IF	
Big 12 Freshman of the Year	Teagan Kavan	P	
Big 12 Coach of the Year	Mike White		
All-Big 12 First Team	Reese Atwood	C/IF	
All-Big 12 First Team	Citlaly Gutierrez	P	
All-Big 12 First Team	Teagan Kavan	P	
All-Big 12 First Team	Ashton Maloney	OF	
All-Big 12 First Team	Mia Scott	IF	
All-Big 12 Second Team	Kayden Henry	OF	
All-Big 12 Second Team	Viviana Martinez	IF	
All-Big 12 Second Team	Katie Stewart	C/IF	
All-Big 12 Freshman Team	Kayden Henry	OF	
All-Big 12 Freshman Team	Teagan Kavan	P	
All-Big 12 Freshman Team	Katie Stewart	C/IF	

=== Weekly honors ===
Weekly honors
Honors	Player	Position	Date Awarded	Ref.
Big 12 Player of the Week	Reese Atwood	C/IF	February 13, 2024	
NFCA Player of the Week	Reese Atwood	C/IF	February 13, 2024	
Big 12 Player of the Week	Kayden Henry	OF	February 20, 2024	
NFCA Player of the Week	Kayden Henry	OF	February 20, 2024	
Big 12 Pitcher of the Week	Citlaly Gutierrez	P	February 20, 2024	
Big 12 Player of the Week	Reese Atwood	C/IF	February 27, 2024	
NFCA Player of the Week	Reese Atwood	C/IF	February 27, 2024	
D1Softball Player of the Week	Reese Atwood	C/IF	February 27, 2024	
Big 12 Pitcher of the Week	Teagan Kavan	P	March 5, 2024	
Big 12 Pitcher of the Week	Teagan Kavan	P	March 26, 2024	
Big 12 Pitcher of the Week	Estelle Czech	P	April 9, 2024	
NFCA Pitcher of the Week	Estelle Czech	P	April 9, 2024	
Big 12 Player of the Week	Katie Stewart	C/IF	April 30, 2024	
NFCA Player of the Week	Katie Stewart	C/IF	April 30, 2024	
Big 12 Player of the Week	Reese Atwood	C/IF	May 7, 2024	
NFCA Player of the Week	Reese Atwood	C/IF	May 7, 2024	
D1Softball Player of the Week	Reese Atwood	C/IF	May 7, 2024	

== Rankings ==
Ranking movements Legend: ██ Increase in ranking ██ Decrease in ranking
	Week															
Poll	Pre	1	2	3	4	5	6	7	8	9	10	11	12	13	14	Final
NFCA / USA Today	8	3	2	2	2	3	3	2	4	2	1	1	1	1	1	2
Softball America	7	2	2	2	2	4	4	2	6	4	1	1	1	1		2
ESPN.com/USA Softball	5	3	2	2	1	3	2	2	5	1	1	1	1	1	1	2
D1Softball	5	2	2	2	1	3	2	2	4	1	1	1	1	1		2
