= Paytn Monticelli =

American softball player (born 2004)

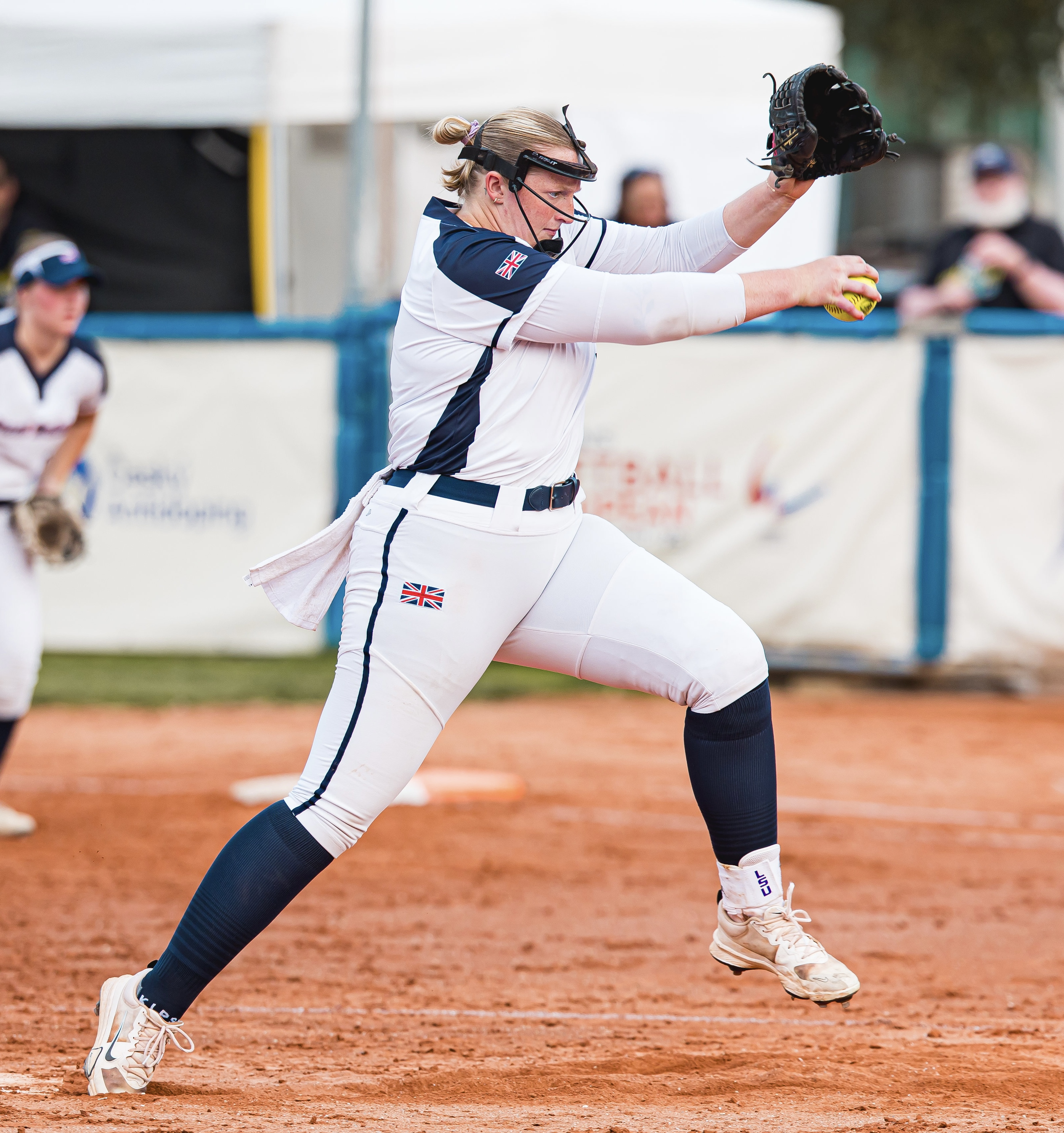
- Monticelli pitching for Great Britain at the 2025 European Championships
- Pitcher
- Born: April 8, 2004 (age 22); Grafton, Wisconsin, U.S.

Teams
- College: Wisconsin (2023); Oklahoma (2024-2025); LSU (2026); Summer collegiate: Madison Night Mares (NWLS) 2025; Professional: Atlanta Smoke (PSL) 2026

Career highlights and awards
- Women's College World Series champion (2024); 2x Gatorade Wisconsin Softball Player of the Year (2021, 2022); 2x USA Wisconsin Softball Player of the Year (2021, 2022)
Medals
Women's softball
Representing Great Britain
Women's Softball European Championship
Bronze medal – third place	2025 Prague	Team

Paytn Monticelli (born April 8, 2004) is a British-American college softball pitcher. She played collegiate softball for LSU, Oklahoma, and Wisconsin. She has also played professionally in the Professional Softball League (PSL). Internationally, she plays for Great Britain.

== High school career ==
Monticelli attended Cedarburg High School in Cedarburg, Wisconsin. She played travel softball for the Beverly Bandits.

At Cedarburg, Monticelli established herself as one of the best pitchers in the program’s history. As a freshman, she set the single-season strikeout record with 220 in 125.0 innings pitched. She earned the Gatorade Wisconsin Softball Player of the Year award twice, as a junior in 2021 and again as a senior in 2022. In her senior season, Monticelli posted a 0.33 earned run average (ERA) and was ranked the No. 32 player in the class of 2022 by Extra Inning Softball. Over the course of her career, she was a two-time First-Team All-State selection, struck out a total of 826 batters, and recorded three no-hitters.

On October 5, 2021, she committed to play college softball at Wisconsin.

== College career ==
As a freshman at Wisconsin during the 2023 season, Monticelli appeared in 21 games, including 13 starts, and recorded a 7–4 win–loss record. She pitched 80.0 innings, registering a 2.71 ERA, three complete games, and a team-leading 82 strikeouts. Her 82 strikeouts on the season ranked ninth all-time for a freshman in program history. Following the season, she transferred to Oklahoma.

During the 2024 season, Monticelli established herself as Oklahoma's top bullpen arm. In 18 appearances, she pitched to a 1.09 ERA, while striking out 23 batters in 19 1/3 innings of work. Oklahoma would go on to win the national championship that season, their fourth consecutive title. In her junior season, Monticelli returned to the Sooner bullpen. In 16 appearances, she recorded 20 strikeouts in 21 1/3 innings of work, and pitched to a 3.94 ERA.

In summer 2025, she played for the Madison Night Mares of the Northwoods League. She later became the first NWLS alum to appear in professional softball.

On July 28, 2025, Monticelli transferred to LSU. She finished her college career with the Tigers, earning the accolade of SEC Pitcher of the Week in April.

== Professional career ==
In June 2026, Monticelli made her professional debut with the Atlanta Smoke of the PSL.

== International career ==
Monticelli has represented Great Britain in international competition.

At the 2025 European Championships, Monticelli did not give up a single earned run (0.00 ERA). Over the course of 16 1/3 innings, she recorded 33 strikeouts and limited opposing batters to a .073 average, leading all pitchers in the tournament. Great Britain ultimately secured the bronze medal.

== Personal life ==
Monticelli was born on a Royal Air Force base in England, and one of her great-grandmothers is from Wales.
