= 2024 NCAA Division I softball tournament =

College softball tournament

- Teams: 64
- Finals site: Devon Park; Oklahoma City
- Champions: Oklahoma (8th title)
- Runner-up: Texas (7th WCWS Appearance)
- Winning coach: Patty Gasso (8th title)
- MOP: Kelly Maxwell (Oklahoma)
- Television: ABC; ESPN; ESPN2; ESPNU; ESPN+

The 2024 NCAA Division I softball tournament was held from May 17 through June 6, 2024, as the final part of the 2024 NCAA Division I softball season. The tournament ended with the 2024 Women's College World Series at Devon Park in Oklahoma City. Oklahoma won the 2024 Women's College World Series, becoming the first team in college softball history to four-peat.

Dayton, Siena and Southeastern Louisiana made their NCAA Division I softball tournament debuts.

All 13 softball playing schools of the Southeastern Conference were selected for the tournament. This marked the fourth time in conference history that all 13 programs qualified for the NCAA tournament.

== Format ==
A total of 64 teams entered the tournament, with 32 of them receiving an automatic bid by either winning their conference's tournament or by finishing in first place in their conference. The remaining 32 bids were at-large, with selections extended by the NCAA Selection Committee.

== Bids ==
The Big West and West Coast Conference bids were awarded to the regular-season champion. All other conferences had their automatic bid go to the conference tournament winner.

=== Automatic ===
Conference	School	Best finish	Last NCAA appearance
ACC	Duke	Super Regionals (2022, 2023)	2023
America East	UAlbany	Regionals (2005, 2006, 2007, 2011, 2014, 2017, 2018)	2018
American	Charlotte	Regionals (2023)	2023
ASUN	Florida Gulf Coast	Regionals (2012)	2012
Atlantic 10	Dayton	First appearance	First appearance
Big 12	Oklahoma	National champion (2000, 2013, 2016, 2017, 2021, 2022, 2023)	2023
Big East	Villanova	Regionals (2021, 2022)	2022
Big Sky	Northern Colorado	Regionals (2023)	2023
Big South	USC Upstate	Regionals (2013, 2014, 2015, 2016, 2017)	2017
Big Ten	Michigan	National champion (2005)	2022
Big West	Cal State Fullerton	National champion (1986)	2023
CAA	UNC Wilmington	Regionals (2022)	2022
Conference USA	Liberty	Regionals (2002, 2011, 2018, 2021, 2022, 2023)	2023
Horizon	Cleveland State	Regionals (1997, 2009)	2009
Ivy League	Princeton	WCWS (1995, 1996)	2022
MAAC	Siena	First appearance	First appearance
MAC	Miami (OH)	Regionals (2005, 2009, 2012, 2016, 2021, 2022, 2023)	2023
MEAC	Morgan State	Regionals (2021)	2021
Missouri Valley	Southern Illinois	WCWS (1970, 1977, 1978)	2023
Mountain West	San Diego State	Super Regional (2023)	2023
NEC	Saint Francis	Regionals (2017, 2018, 2019, 2021, 2022)	2022
Ohio Valley	Southeast Missouri	Regionals (1999, 2019)	2019
Pac-12	UCLA	National champion (1982, 1984, 1985, 1988, 1989, 1990, 1992, 1999, 2003, 2004, 2010, 2019)	2023
Patriot	Boston University	Regionals (1996, 2002, 2003, 2009, 2010, 2012, 2014, 2016, 2018, 2019, 2021, 2023)	2023
SEC	Florida	National champion (2014, 2015)	2023
Southern	Chattanooga	Regionals (2000, 2001, 2002, 2003, 2004, 2008, 2009, 2011, 2014, 2015, 2019, 2022)	2022
Southland	Southeastern Louisiana	First appearance	First appearance
SWAC	Jackson State	Regionals (2011)	2011
Summit	Omaha	Regionals (2023)	2023
Sun Belt	Texas State	Regionals (1999, 2001, 2003, 2009, 2011, 2012, 2016, 2017, 2018, 2021, 2023)	2023
WAC	Grand Canyon	Regionals (2022, 2023)	2023
West Coast	Saint Mary's	Regionals (2010)	2010

=== At-large ===
Team	Conference
Alabama	SEC
Arizona	Pac-12
Arkansas	SEC
Auburn	SEC
Baylor	Big 12
California	Pac-12
Clemson	ACC
Florida Atlantic	AAC
Florida State	ACC
Georgia	SEC
Indiana	Big Ten
Kentucky	SEC
Louisiana	Sun Belt
LSU	SEC
Mississippi State	SEC
Missouri	SEC
Northwestern	Big Ten
Oklahoma State	Big 12
Ole Miss	SEC
Oregon	Pac-12
Penn State	Big Ten
South Alabama	Sun Belt
South Carolina	SEC
Stanford	Pac-12
Texas	Big 12
Tennessee	SEC
Texas A&M	SEC
UCF	Big 12
Utah	Pac-12
Virginia	ACC
Virginia Tech	ACC
Washington	Pac-12

=== By conference ===
Conference	Total	Schools
SEC	13	Alabama, Arkansas, Auburn, Florida, Georgia, Kentucky, LSU, Ole Miss, Mississippi State, Missouri, South Carolina, Tennessee, Texas A&M
Pac-12	7	Arizona, California, Oregon, Stanford, UCLA, Utah, Washington
ACC	5	Clemson, Duke, Florida State, Virginia, Virginia Tech
Big 12	5	Baylor, Oklahoma, Oklahoma State, Texas, UCF
Big Ten	4	Indiana, Michigan, Northwestern, Penn State
Sun Belt	3	Louisiana, South Alabama, Texas State
American	2	Charlotte, Florida Atlantic
ASUN	1	Florida Gulf Coast
CUSA	1	Liberty
America East	1	UAlbany
Atlantic 10	1	Dayton
Big East	1	Villanova
Big Sky	1	Northern Colorado
Big South	1	USC Upstate
Big West	1	Cal State Fullerton
CAA	1	UNC Wilmington
Horizon	1	Cleveland State
Ivy League	1	Princeton
MAAC	1	Siena
MAC	1	Miami (OH)
MEAC	1	Morgan State
Missouri Valley	1	Southern Illinois
Mountain West	1	San Diego State
Northeast	1	Saint Francis
Ohio Valley	1	Southeast Missouri
Patriot	1	Boston University
SoCon	1	Chattanooga
Southland	1	Southeastern Louisiana
SWAC	1	Jackson State
Summit	1	Omaha
WAC	1	Grand Canyon
West Coast	1	Saint Mary’s

== National seeds ==
Sixteen national seeds were announced on the Selection Show, on Sunday, May 12 at 7 p.m. EDT on ESPN2 and ESPN+. Teams in italics advanced to Super Regionals. Teams in bold advanced to the Women's College World Series.

1. **Texas**
2. **Oklahoma**
3. Tennessee
4. **Florida**
5. **Oklahoma State**
6. **UCLA**
7. Missouri
8. **Stanford**

9. LSU
10. **Duke**
11. Georgia
12. Arkansas
13. Louisiana
14. **Alabama**
15. Florida State
16. Texas A&M

== Regionals and Super Regionals ==
The Regionals took place May 17–19. The Super Regionals took place May 23–26.

=== Austin Super Regional ===
Round 1	Round 2
**1**	**Texas**	**5**
Siena	0
**1**	**Texas**	**14^{(5)}**
Northwestern	2
**Northwestern**	**7**
Saint Francis (PA)	2
Austin Regional – Red and Charline McCombs Field
Siena	0
**Saint Francis (PA)**	**1**
**Northwestern**	**5**
Saint Francis (PA)	1
**16**	**Texas A&M**	**6**
UAlbany	2
**16**	**Texas A&M**	**1**
Texas State	0
**Texas State**	**4**
Penn State	2
College Station Regional – Davis Diamond
UAlbany	3
**Penn State**	**9**
**Texas State**	**8**
Penn State	4

Regional Finals
**1**	**Texas**	**7**	—
Northwestern	0	—
**16**	**Texas A&M**	**8^{(5)}**	—
Texas State	0	—

Super Regionals
**1**	**Texas**	5	**9^{(9)}**	**6**
16	Texas A&M	**6**	8	5

=== Stanford Super Regional ===
Round 1	Round 2
**8**	**Stanford**	**8**
Saint Mary's (CA)	6
**8**	**Stanford**	**2**
Mississippi State	1
**Mississippi State**	**1**
Cal State Fullerton	0
Stanford Regional – Boyd & Jill Smith Family Stadium
Saint Mary's (CA)	1
**Cal State Fullerton**	**6**
Mississippi State	0
**Cal State Fullerton**	**7**
**9**	**LSU**	**5**
Jackson State	0
**9**	**LSU**	**4**
Southern Illinois	1
California	4
**Southern Illinois**	**5**
Baton Rouge Regional – Tiger Park
Jackson State	0
**California**	**15^{(5)}**
**Southern Illinois**	**3**
California	2

Regional Finals
**8**	**Stanford**	1	**4**
Cal State Fullerton	**8**	2
**9**	**LSU**	**9^{(5)}**	—
Southern Illinois	0	—

Super Regionals
**8**	**Stanford**	1	**3**	**8^{(6)}**
9	LSU	**11^{(5)}**	0	0

=== Stillwater Super Regional ===
Round 1	Round 2
**5**	**Oklahoma State**	**6**
Northern Colorado	0
**5**	**Oklahoma State**	**6**
Kentucky	2
**Kentucky**	**4**
Michigan	3
Stillwater Regional – Cowgirl Stadium
Northern Colorado	2
**Michigan**	**4**
Kentucky	2
**Michigan**	**4**
**12**	**Arkansas**	**3**
Southeast Missouri	2
12	Arkansas	1
**Arizona**	**2**
**Arizona**	**14^{(5)}**
Villanova	3
Fayetteville Regional – Bogle Park
Southeast Missouri	1
**Villanova**	**4**
12	Arkansas	2
**Villanova**	**7**

Regional Finals
**5**	**Oklahoma State**	**4**	—
Michigan	1	—
**Arizona**	**9**	—
Villanova	4	—

Super Regionals
**5**	**Oklahoma State**	**8^{(5)}**	**10**	—
Arizona	0	4	—

=== Gainesville Super Regional ===
Round 1	Round 2
**4**	**Florida**	**6**
Florida Gulf Coast	0
**4**	**Florida**	**9^{(5)}**
South Alabama	1
**South Alabama**	**1**
Florida Atlantic	0
Gainesville Regional – Katie Seashole Pressly Softball Stadium
**Florida Gulf Coast**	**3**
Florida Atlantic	2
**South Alabama**	**5**
Florida Gulf Coast	1
**13**	**Louisiana**	**8^{(5)}**
Princeton	0
13	Louisiana	0
**Baylor**	**8^{(5)}**
**Baylor**	**3**
Ole Miss	1
Lafayette Regional – Yvette Girouard Field at Lamson Park
**Princeton**	**4**
Ole Miss	2
**13**	**Louisiana**	**2^{(8)}**
Princeton	1

Regional Finals
**4**	**Florida**	**9^{(5)}**	—
South Alabama	1	—
**Baylor**	0	**4**
13	Louisiana	**13^{(5)}**	3

Super Regionals
**4**	**Florida**	**4**	2	**5**
Baylor	2	**5**	3

=== Knoxville Super Regional ===
Round 1	Round 2
**3**	**Tennessee**	**3**
Dayton	0
**3**	**Tennessee**	**12^{(5)}**
Virginia	0
**Virginia**	**7**
Miami (OH)	0
Knoxville Regional – Sherri Parker Lee Stadium
Dayton	0
**Miami (OH)**	**4**
**Virginia**	**6**
Miami (OH)	0
**14**	**Alabama**	**1**
USC Upstate	0
**14**	**Alabama**	**6^{(9)}**
Southeastern Louisiana	3
Clemson	2
**Southeastern Louisiana**	**6**
Tuscaloosa Regional – Rhoads Stadium
USC Upstate	0
**Clemson**	**8^{(6)}**
**Southeastern Louisiana**	**6**
Clemson	2

Regional Finals
**3**	**Tennessee**	**6**	—
Virginia	0	—
**14**	**Alabama**	**12^{(5)}**	—
Southeastern Louisiana	2	—

Super Regionals
3	Tennessee	**3**	2	1
**14**	**Alabama**	2	**3^{(14)}**	**4**

=== Los Angeles Super Regional ===
Round 1	Round 2
**6**	**UCLA**	**9^{(5)}**
Grand Canyon	0
**6**	**UCLA**	**7**
Virginia Tech	6
**Virginia Tech**	**5**
San Diego State	1
Los Angeles Regional – Easton Stadium
**Grand Canyon**	**9**
San Diego State	7
Virginia Tech	1
**Grand Canyon**	**4**
**11**	**Georgia**	**8^{(5)}**
UNC Wilmington	0
11	Georgia	3
**Liberty**	**7**
Charlotte	3
**Liberty**	**6**
Athens Regional – Jack Turner Stadium
UNC Wilmington	0
**Charlotte**	**5**
**11**	**Georgia**	**5**
Charlotte	0

Regional Finals
**6**	**UCLA**	**9^{(5)}**	—
Grand Canyon	1	—
Liberty	5	2
**11**	**Georgia**	**14**	**3**

Super Regionals
**6**	**UCLA**	**8^{(6)}**	**6**	—
11	Georgia	0	1	—

=== Columbia Super Regional ===
Round 1	Round 2
7	Missouri	1
**Omaha**	**3^{(9)}**
**Omaha**	**3**
Washington	2
**Washington**	**8**
Indiana	7
Columbia Regional – Mizzou Softball Stadium
**7**	**Missouri**	**5**
Indiana	1
Washington	1
**7**	**Missouri**	**4**
**10**	**Duke**	**6**
Morgan State	1
**10**	**Duke**	**8^{(6)}**
South Carolina	0
**South Carolina**	**2**
Utah	1
Durham Regional – Duke Softball Stadium
Morgan State	0
**Utah**	**1**
**South Carolina**	**5**
Utah	1

Regional Finals
Omaha	1	0
**7**	**Missouri**	**5**	**1^{(9)}**
**10**	**Duke**	**10**	—
South Carolina	1	—

Super Regionals
7	Missouri	3	**3**	3
**10**	**Duke**	**6**	1	**4^{(9)}**

=== Norman Super Regional ===
Round 1	Round 2
**2**	**Oklahoma**	**9^{(6)}**
Cleveland State	0
**2**	**Oklahoma**	**6**
Oregon	3
**Oregon**	**8^{(5)}**
Boston University	0
Norman Regional – Love's Field
Cleveland State	0
**Boston University**	**8^{(5)}**
**Oregon**	**8**
Boston University	2
**15**	**Florida State**	**3**
Chattanooga	2
**15**	**Florida State**	**5**
UCF	1
Auburn	6
**UCF**	**11**
Tallahassee Regional – JoAnne Graf Field
Chattanooga	0
**Auburn**	**9^{(5)}**
UCF	1
**Auburn**	**2^{(12)}**

Regional Finals
**2**	**Oklahoma**	**3**	—
Oregon	2	—
**15**	**Florida State**	**10**	—
Auburn	4	—

Super Regionals
**2**	**Oklahoma**	**11^{(5)}**	**4**	—
15	Florida State	3	2	—

== Women's College World Series ==
The Women's College World Series was held May 30 through June 6 in Oklahoma City.

=== Participants ===
School	Conference	Record (conference)	Head coach	WCWS appearances† (including 2024 WCWS)	WCWS best finish†*	WCWS W–L record† (excluding 2024 WCWS)
Alabama	SEC	38–18 (10–14)	Patrick Murphy	15 (last: 2023)	1st (2012)	22–27
Duke	ACC	52–7 (20–4)	Marissa Young	1 (last: First appearance)	First appearance	0–0
Florida	SEC	49–12 (17–7)	Tim Walton	12 (last: 2022)	1st (2014, 2015)	27–20
Oklahoma	Big 12	54–6 (22–5)	Patty Gasso	17 (last: 2023)	1st (2000, 2013, 2016, 2017, 2021, 2022, 2023)	48–23
Oklahoma State	Big 12	49–10 (21–6)	Kenny Gajewski	12 (last: 2023)	3rd (1989, 1990, 1993, 1994, 2022)	15–22
Stanford	Pac-12	48–15 (17–7)	Jessica Allister	4 (last: 2023)	4th (2001, 2004, 2023)	6–5
Texas	Big 12	52–8 (23–4)	Mike White	7 (last: 2022)	2nd (2022)	11–13
UCLA	Pac-12	42–10 (17–4)	Kelly Inouye-Perez	32 (last: 2022)	1st (1982, 1984, 1985, 1988, 1989, 1990, 1992, 1999, 2003, 2004, 2010, 2019)	107–40

=== Bracket ===
First round
**1**	**Texas**	**4**
8	Stanford	0
**4**	**Florida**	**1**
5	Oklahoma State	0
**8**	**Stanford**	**8^{(6)}**
5	Oklahoma State	0
**6**	**UCLA**	**4**
14	Alabama	1
**2**	**Oklahoma**	**9^{(6)}**
10	Duke	1
**14**	**Alabama**	**2**
10	Duke	1

Second round
**1**	**Texas**	**10^{(5)}**
4	Florida	0
6	UCLA	1
**8**	**Stanford**	**3**
6	UCLA	0
**2**	**Oklahoma**	**1**
**4**	**Florida**	**6**
14	Alabama	4

Semifinals
**1**	**Texas**	**1**	—
8	Stanford	0	—
**2**	**Oklahoma**	3	**6^{(8)}**
4	Florida	**9**	5

Finals
1	Texas	3	4	—
**2**	**Oklahoma**	**8**	**8**	—

Game times are based on the local time (CDT) in Oklahoma City

=== Game results ===
Date	Game	Winning team	Score	Losing team	Winning pitcher	Losing pitcher	Save	Notes
May 30	Game 1	UCLA	4–1	Alabama	Taylor Tinsley (18–8)	Kayla Beaver (18–10)	–	Boxscore
May 30	Game 2	Oklahoma	9–1 ^{(6)}	Duke	Kierston Deal (13–1)	Jala Wright (19–3)	–	Boxscore
May 30	Game 3	Texas	4–0	Stanford	Teagan Kavan (19–2)	NiJaree Canady (22–6)	–	Boxscore
May 30	Game 4	Florida	1–0	Oklahoma State	Keagan Rothrock (31–7)	Lexi Kilfoyl (26–4)	–	Boxscore
May 31	Game 5	Alabama	2–1	Duke	Kayla Beaver (19–10)	Cassidy Curd (13–4)	–	Duke eliminated Boxscore
May 31	Game 6	Stanford	8–0 ^{(6)}	Oklahoma State	NiJaree Canady (23–6)	Lexi Kilfoyl (26–5)	–	Oklahoma State eliminated Boxscore
June 1	Game 7	Oklahoma	1–0	UCLA	Kelly Maxwell (21–2)	Kaitlyn Terry (21–2)	–	Boxscore
June 1	Game 8	Texas	10–0 ^{(5)}	Florida	Mac Morgan (16–1)	Keagan Rothrock (31–8)	–	Boxscore
June 2	Game 9	Florida	6–4	Alabama	Keagan Rothrock (32–8)	Jocelyn Briski (10–6)	–	Alabama eliminated Boxscore
June 2	Game 10	Stanford	3–1	UCLA	NiJaree Canady (24–6)	Kaitlyn Terry (21–3)	–	UCLA eliminated Boxscore
June 3	Game 11	Florida	9–3	Oklahoma	Keagan Rothrock (33–8)	Nicole May (14–3)	–	Boxscore
June 3	Game 13	Texas	1–0	Stanford	Teagan Kavan (20–2)	NiJaree Canady (24–7)	–	Stanford eliminated Boxscore
June 4	Game 12	Oklahoma	6–5 ^{(8)}	Florida	Kelly Maxwell (22–2)	Keagan Rothrock (33–9)	–	Florida eliminated Boxsore
Finals
June 5	Game 1	Oklahoma	8–3	Texas	Kelly Maxwell (23–2)	Teagan Kavan (20–3)	–	Oklahoma 1–0
June 6	Game 2	Oklahoma	8–4	Texas	Kierston Deal (14–1)	Estelle Czech (8–4)	Kelly Maxwell (3)	Oklahoma wins WCWS

=== Finals ===
==== Game 1 ====
June 5, 2024 – 7:00 p.m. (CDT) at Devon Park in Oklahoma City, Oklahoma
Team	1	2	3	4	5	6	7	R	H	E
**Oklahoma**	2	0	3	0	1	1	1	**8**	**9**	**1**
Texas	1	0	0	0	0	2	0	**3**	**4**	**3**
WP: Kelly Maxwell (23–2) LP: Teagan Kavan (20–3); Home runs: OKLA: Tiare Jennings, Kinzie Hansen, Kasidi Pickering; TEX: Mia Scott; Attendance: 12,317; Boxscore

==== Game 2 ====
June 6, 2024 – 7:00 p.m. (CDT) at Devon Park in Oklahoma City, Oklahoma
Team	1	2	3	4	5	6	7	R	H	E
Texas	0	1	1	1	0	1	0	**4**	**7**	**0**
**Oklahoma**	0	2	0	3	0	3	x	**8**	**12**	**1**
WP: Kierston Deal (14–1) LP: Estelle Czech (8–4) Sv: Kelly Maxwell (3); Home runs: TEX: None; OKLA: Kasidi Pickering; Attendance: 12,324; Boxscore

=== All-tournament Team ===
The following players were members of the Women's College World Series All-Tournament Team.

Position	Player	School
P	NiJaree Canady	Stanford
P	Teagan Kavan	Texas
P	**Kelly Maxwell (MOP)**	Oklahoma
P	Keagan Rothrock	Florida
INF	Tiare Jennings	Oklahoma
INF	Mia Scott	Texas
INF	Katie Stewart	Texas
OF	Kasidi Pickering	Oklahoma
C	Jocelyn Erickson	Florida
C	Kinzie Hansen	Oklahoma
DP	Ella Parker	Oklahoma
DP	Regan Walsh	Florida

== Record by conference ==
Conference	# of Bids	Record	Win %	RF	SR	WS	NS	F	NC
Big 12	5	28–11	.718	4	4	3	2	2	1
SEC	13	42–30	.583	9	7	2	1	–	–
Pac-12	7	21–16	.568	4	3	2	1	–	–
ACC	5	12–11	.522	3	2	1	–	–	–
Sun Belt	3	7–6	.538	3	–	–	–	–	–
Big Ten	4	5–8	.385	2	–	–	–	–	–
Big West	1	3–2	.600	1	–	–	–	–	–
Big East	1	2–2	.500	1	–	–	–	–	–
CUSA	1	2–2	.500	1	–	–	–	–	–
Missouri Valley	1	2–2	.500	1	–	–	–	–	–
Southland	1	2–2	.500	1	–	–	–	–	–
Summit	1	2–2	.500	1	–	–	–	–	–
WAC	1	2–2	.500	1	–	–	–	–	–
American	2	1–4	.200	–	–	–	–	–	–
ASUN	1	1–2	.333	–	–	–	–	–	–
Ivy League	1	1–2	.333	–	–	–	–	–	–
MAC	1	1–2	.333	–	–	–	–	–	–
Northeast	1	1–2	.333	–	–	–	–	–	–
Patriot	1	1–2	.333	–	–	–	–	–	–
America East	1	0–2	.000	–	–	–	–	–	–
Atlantic 10	1	0–2	.000	–	–	–	–	–	–
Big Sky	1	0–2	.000	–	–	–	–	–	–
Big South	1	0–2	.000	–	–	–	–	–	–
CAA	1	0–2	.000	–	–	–	–	–	–
Horizon	1	0–2	.000	–	–	–	–	–	–
MAAC	1	0–2	.000	–	–	–	–	–	–
MEAC	1	0–2	.000	–	–	–	–	–	–
Mountain West	1	0–2	.000	–	–	–	–	–	–
Ohio Valley	1	0–2	.000	–	–	–	–	–	–
SoCon	1	0–2	.000	–	–	–	–	–	–
SWAC	1	0–2	.000	–	–	–	–	–	–
West Coast	1	0–2	.000	–	–	–	–	–	–

== Media coverage ==
=== Radio ===
For the fourth consecutive year Westwood One will provide nationwide radio coverage of every game in the Women's College World Series. Ryan Radtke and Leah Amico returned as two of the broadcasters.

=== Television ===
ESPN holds exclusive rights to the tournament. The network will air games across ABC, ESPN, ESPN2, ESPNU, ESPN+, SEC Network, Longhorn Network, and ACC Network. For just the seventh time in the history of the women's softball tournament, ESPN covered every regional.

==== Broadcast assignments ====
Regionals

- Austin: Alex Loeb & Cat Osterman
- Norman: Roy Philpott & Jennie Ritter
- Knoxville: Eric Frede & Madison Shipman
- Gainesville: Alex Perlman & Nicole Mendes
- Stillwater: Beth Mowins, Jessica Mendoza & Michele Smith
- Los Angeles: Courtney Lyle & Danielle Lawrie
- Columbia: Chuckie Kempf & Monica Abbott
- Stanford: Mike Couzens & Kenzie Fowler

Super Regionals

- Austin: Kevin Brown & Amanda Scarborough
- Norman: Beth Mowins, Jessica Mendoza, & Michele Smith
- Knoxville: Eric Frede & Madison Shipman
- Gainesville: Matt Schumaker & Erin Miller Thiessen

Women's College World Series

- Kevin Brown, Amanda Scarborough & Alyssa Lang (afternoons & late games)
- Beth Mowins, Jessica Mendoza, Michele Smith & Holly Rowe (primetime)

Regionals

- Baton Rogue: Kevin Fitzgerald & Aleshia Ocasio
- Durham: Pam Ward & Jenny Dalton-Hill
- Athens: Jenn Hildreth & Leah Amico
- Fayetteville: Noah Reed & Raine Wilson
- Lafayette: Clay Matvick & Natasha Watley
- Tuscaloosa: Matt Schumacker & Amanda Scarborough
- Tallahassee: Mark Neely & Carol Bruggeman
- College Station: Trey Bender & Brittany McKinney

Super Regionals

- Stillwater: Mark Neely & Carol Bruggeman
- Los Angeles: Courtney Lyle & Danielle Lawrie
- Columbia: Pam Ward & Jenny Dalton-Hill
- Stanford: Mike Couzens & Kenzie Fowler

Women's College World Series Finals

- Beth Mowins, Jessica Mendoza, Michele Smith & Holly Rowe
