= Kelly Maxwell (softball) =

American softball player

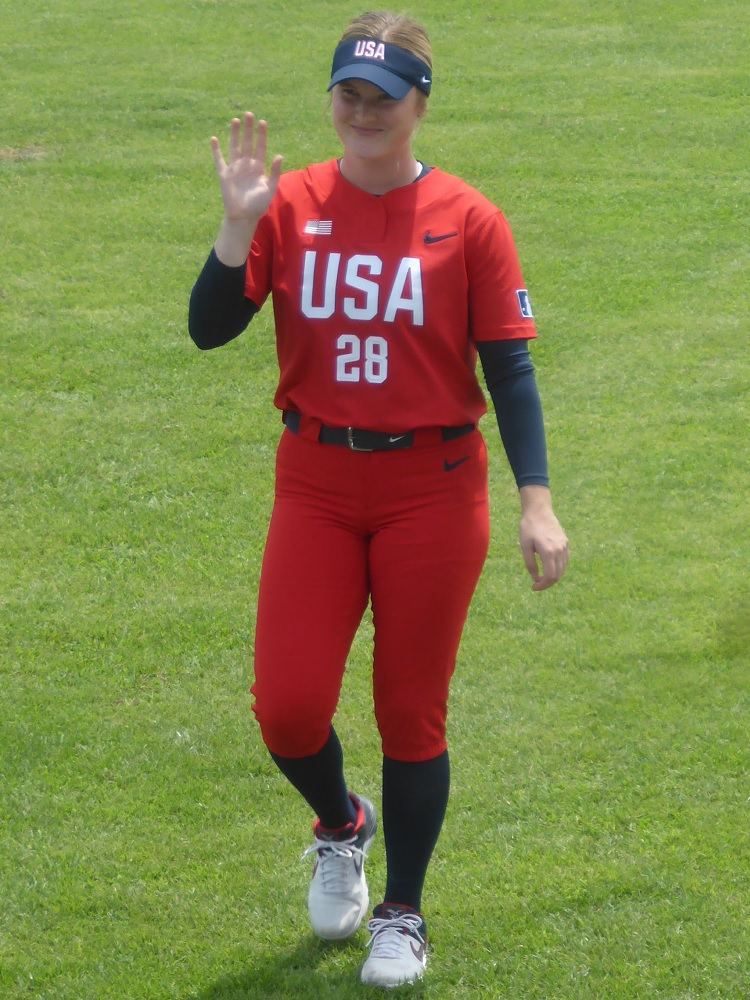

Portland Cascade
- Pitcher
- Born: April 11, 2000 (age 26); Houston, Texas, U.S.

Teams
- Oklahoma State (2019–2023); Oklahoma (2024); Toyota Industries Shining Vega (2024–present); Portland Cascade (2025–present)

Career highlights and awards
- World Cup All-World Team (2024); Women's College World Series champion (2024); Women's College World Series Most Outstanding Player (2024); WCWS All-Tournament Team (2024); Co-Big 12 Pitcher of the Year (2022); First Team All-American (2022); Second Team All-American (2023); 3× First team All-Big 12 (2022–2024)
Medals
Women's softball
Representing the United States
World Cup
| Silver medal – second place | 2024 Castions di Strada | Team |
World Games
| Gold medal – first place | 2025 Chengdu | Team |

Kelly McCall Maxwell (born April 11, 2000) is an American professional softball pitcher for the Portland Cascade of the Athletes Unlimited Softball League (AUSL) and member of the United States women's national softball team. She played college softball at Oklahoma State and Oklahoma.

== High school career ==
Maxwell attended Clear Springs High School in League City, Texas where she lettered in softball all four years. She was named the Clear Springs' MVP in 2015, 2016 and 2018. She missed her junior season due to injury. She returned in her senior season and was named to the NFCA High School All-Region team and named the 2018 Galveston County Player of the Year.

== College career ==
Maxwell began her collegiate career at Oklahoma State. She redshirted during the 2019 season. During the 2020 season in her redshirt freshman year, she made 11 appearances, with eight starts, and posted a 6–3 record with a 1.51 ERA in 46 1/3 innings, in a season that was shortened due to the COVID-19 pandemic. She pitched a perfect game in her first career start on February 5, 2020, in a game against Florida A&M. She was subsequently named the Big 12 Pitcher of the Week on February 11, 2020. On March 8, 2020, she threw a no-hitter in a game against Missouri State. She became the second pitcher since Lauren Bay in 2002 to pitch a perfect game and a no-hitter in the same season, and the first Oklahoma State freshman pitcher to record multiple no-hitters in the same season.

During the 2021 season, in her redshirt sophomore year, she appeared in 28 games with 19 starts, and posted a 15–5 record with a 1.81 ERA and 147 strikeouts in 116 innings. She finished the season with 8.87 strikeouts per seven innings, which ranked seventh on the Oklahoma State all-time single-season list. She started the season with 25 2/3 consecutive scoreless innings and 36 2/3 innings without an earned run. On February 23, 2021, she threw her first no-hitter of the season in game against Texas A&M–Corpus Christi.

During the 2022 season, in her redshirt junior year, she appeared in 35 games with 28 starts, and posted a 21–5 record with a 1.22 ERA, 313 strikeouts, 20 complete-games and 12 shutouts in 189 2/3 innings. She earned Big 12 Pitcher of the Week honors on four occasions in 2022, the most by any pitcher in the conference. She led the conference with 11.58 strikeouts per seven innings, 12 shutouts and 313 strikeouts. She became the third pitcher in program history to surpass 300 strikeouts in a season following Lauren Bay and Melanie Roche. Following an outstanding season, she was named Co-Big 12 Pitcher of the Year and a unanimous first-team All-Big 12 selection. She was also named a unanimous first team All-American and a top-ten finalist for USA Softball Collegiate Player of the Year.

During the 2023 season, in her redshirt senior year, she appeared in 33 games with 24 starts, and posted a 16–7 record with a 1.91 ERA, 229 strikeouts, nine complete-games, four shutouts and a career-high five saves in 142 2/3 innings. She led the Big 12 and ranked second nationally with 11.2 strikeouts per seven innings. Her career total of 10.6 strikeouts per seven innings is an Oklahoma State record. Following the season she was named a first-team All-Big 12 selection.

On July 7, 2023, Maxwell entered the NCAA transfer portal. On August 3, 2023, she announced she would transfer to Oklahoma for her final year of eligibility.

During the 2024 season, in her graduate student year, she posted a 23–2 record with three saves and 164 strikeouts in 155 1/3 innings. She helped lead Oklahoma to the 2024 NCAA Division I softball tournament, where she went 5–0 during the tournament, with a 1.88 ERA and 45 strikeouts. During game one of championship series at the 2024 Women's College World Series, she pitched a one-hitter into the sixth inning before Texas scored two unearned runs on an error that was followed by two run-scoring singles. She finished the game with eight strikeouts, four walks and four hits on 119 pitches. During game two of the championship series she came on in relief and pitched 1 1/3 innings and earned the save, as Oklahoma won their fourth consecutive national championship. She was subsequently named Women's College World Series Most Outstanding Player.

== Professional career ==
On December 1, 2025, Maxwell was drafted first overall by the Cascade in the AUSL allocation draft.

== International career ==
Maxwell represented the United States at the 2024 Women's Softball World Cup and won a silver medal. She represented the United States at the 2025 World Games and won a gold medal. On August 3, 2026, she won a gold medal representing the United States at the USA Softball International Cup.
