= Love's Field =

College softball stadium in Norman, Oklahoma

Coordinates: 35.191220°N 97.442311°W

- Interactive map of Love's Field
- Location: Norman, Oklahoma
- Owner: University of Oklahoma
- Operator: University of Oklahoma
- Capacity: 4,200
- Surface: Tahoma Bermudagrass
- Record attendance: 4,587

Construction
- Groundbreaking: September 23, 2022
- Opened: 2024
- Cost: $48 million

Tenant
- Oklahoma Sooners softball - (NCAA) (2024–present)

Love's Field is a college softball stadium on the campus of the University of Oklahoma. It is the home venue of the Oklahoma Sooners softball team, and the largest on-campus softball facility in the United States.

== History ==
As Sooner softball became a national powerhouse under head coach Patty Gasso, interest in tickets for games easily outstripped supply at their longtime home of Marita Hynes Field. On October 28, 2021, it was announced a new softball stadium was planned to open before the 2024 season. Love's provided the naming gift following a $12 million total donation. The estimated cost for the project was $47.9 million. The University of Oklahoma officially broke ground on Love's Field on September 23, 2022.

The overall square footage of the complex is 44,000 square feet and is the largest on-campus softball facility in the country with a seating capacity of 4,200, more than three times the capacity of Hynes Field. Love's Field features 3,543 in fixed seating and an additional 657 in standing room. The complex features a 10,669-square-foot indoor training center and several team spaces, including a locker room, training room, meeting room, equipment room and lounge, as well as a recognition area to showcase national championships and other team accomplishments. The scoreboard is in the shape of the state of Oklahoma and cost $1.4 million.
