= Red and Charline McCombs Field =

Sports venue in Austin, Texas

Coordinates: 30°16′50.43″N 97°43′29.73″W

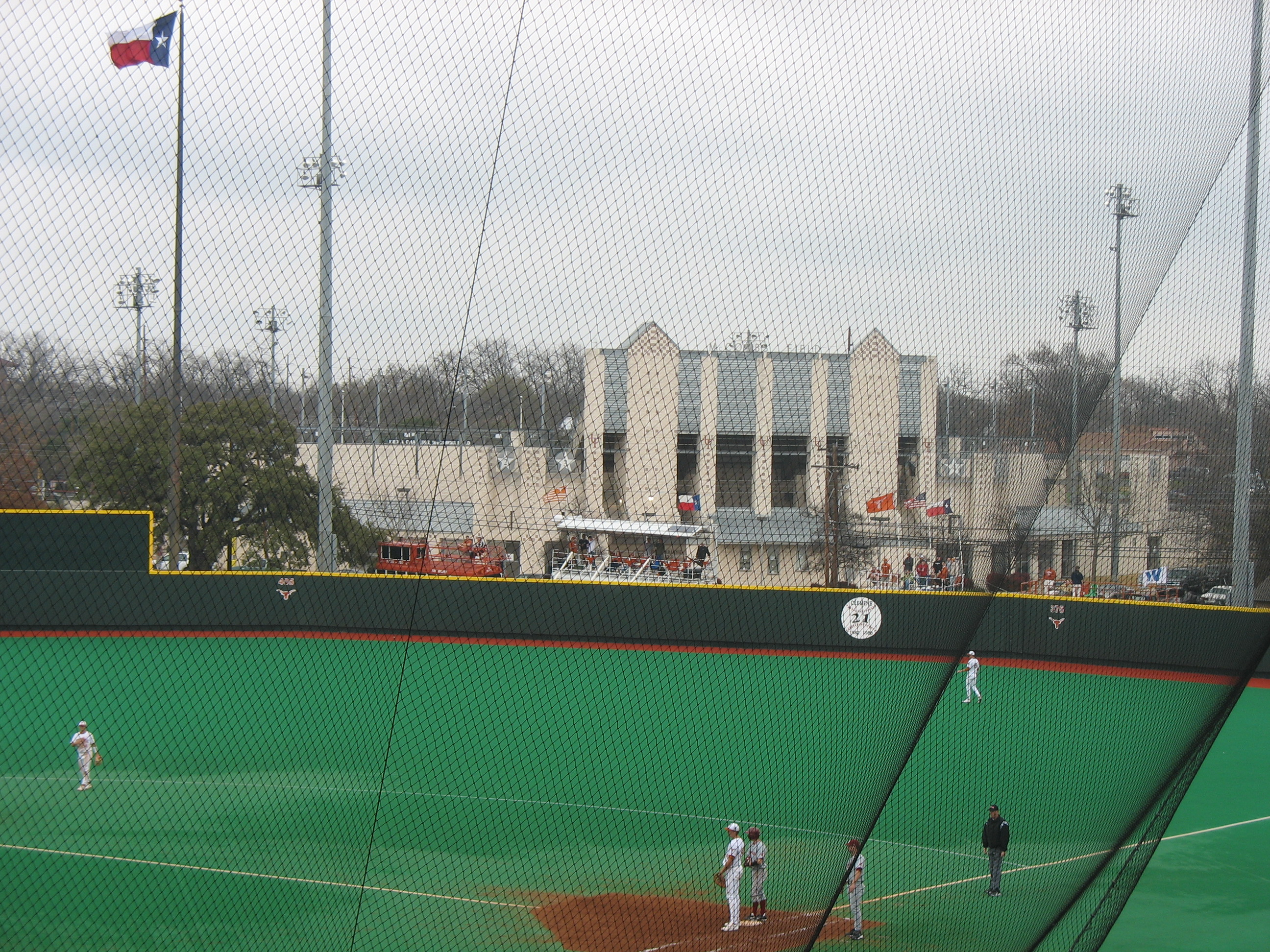
- Interactive map of Red and Charline McCombs Field
- Location: Austin, Texas, United States
- Owner: University of Texas
- Operator: University of Texas
- Capacity: 1,254
- Surface: Bermuda grass

Construction
- Opened: 1998
- Cost: $4.5 million

Tenant
- Texas Longhorns softball (NCAA) (1998–Present)

The Red and Charline McCombs Field is the current home of the University of Texas Longhorn Women's Softball team.

Opening in 1998 at a cost of $4.5 million, the stadium seats 1,254 and is named after university benefactor Red McCombs and his wife Charline. It features a clay infield and a grass outfield. Texas later added a 4,400-square foot training facility along the left-field line, completed in 2009.

== Attendance Record ==
No.	Date	Opponent	Attendance	Result
1	May 26, 2024	Texas A&M	2,214	W 6–5
2	April 6, 2024	Oklahoma	2,084	W 2–1
3	May 25, 2024	Texas A&M	2,011	W 9–8
4	February 24, 2024	Stanford	1,986	L 3–4
5	February 24, 2024	Colorado State	1,983	W 9–0
6	May 24, 2024	Texas A&M	1,976	L 5–6
7	February 23, 2024	Colorado State	1,959	W 7–0
8	February 25, 2024	Louisiana	1,945	W 5–4
9	May 18, 2024	Northwestern	1,928	W 14–2
10	April 7, 2024	Oklahoma	1,922	W 2–1

Through Feb 25, 2024
